= Charles H. Roe =

British bus manufacturing company

Coordinates: 53.8086°N 1.4374°W

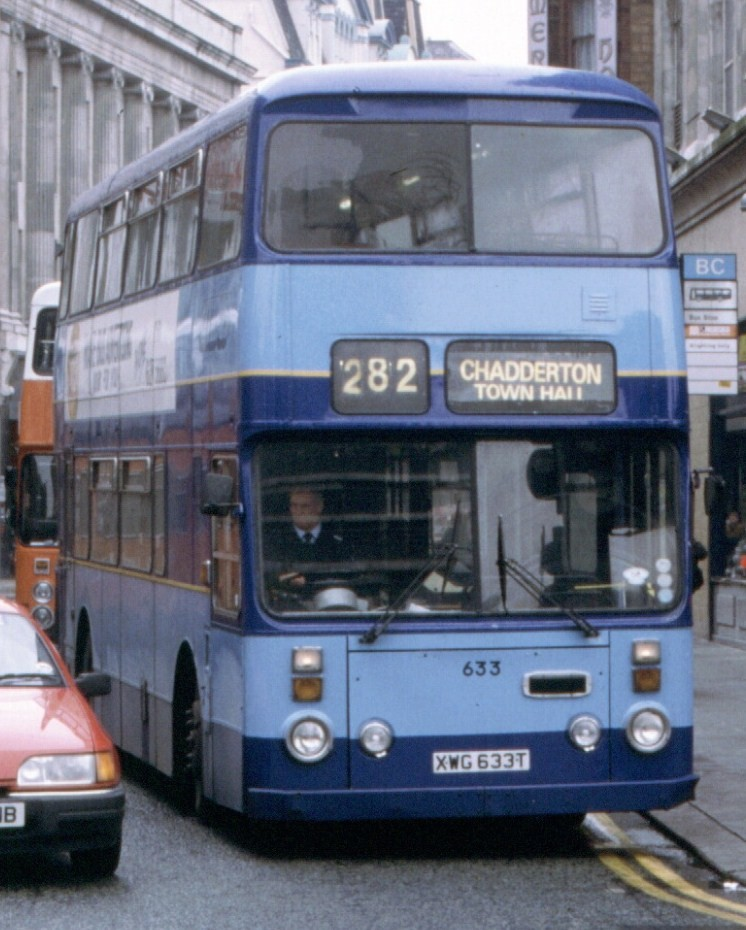
- November 1978 built Roe body on a Leyland Atlantean AN68A/1R, new to South Yorkshire Passenger Transport Executive, pictured in Manchester with Citibus Tours
- Industry: Bus manufacturing
- Founded: 1917
- Founder: Charles Henry Roe
- Defunct: September 1984
- Successor: Optare
- Headquarters: Cross Gates
- Number of employees: 440 (September 1984)
- Parent: British Leyland

Charles H Roe was a Yorkshire coachbuilding company. It was for most of its life based at Crossgates Carriage Works, in Leeds.

In 1947 it was taken over by Park Royal Vehicles. Two years later, along with its parent, it became part of Associated Commercial Vehicles (ACV) in 1949, which was merged with Leyland Motors in 1962. In 1965, 30% of Park Royal and Roe's shares were exchanged by Leyland Motor Corporation for shares in Bristol Commercial Vehicles and Eastern Coach Works held by the Transport Holding Company (THC). Later the THC was succeeded by the National Bus Company (NBC) and Park Royal Vehicles, Charles H Roe, Bristol Commercial Vehicles, Eastern Coach Works and Leyland National Limited became subsidiaries of a new company Bus Manufacturers Holdings, 50% owned by British Leyland and 50% by NBC. Leyland took complete control in 1982 and closed Charles H Roe in September 1984. In the following year, a group of employees from the former business, began the Optare coachbuilding business in the former Roe carriage works.

== History overview ==
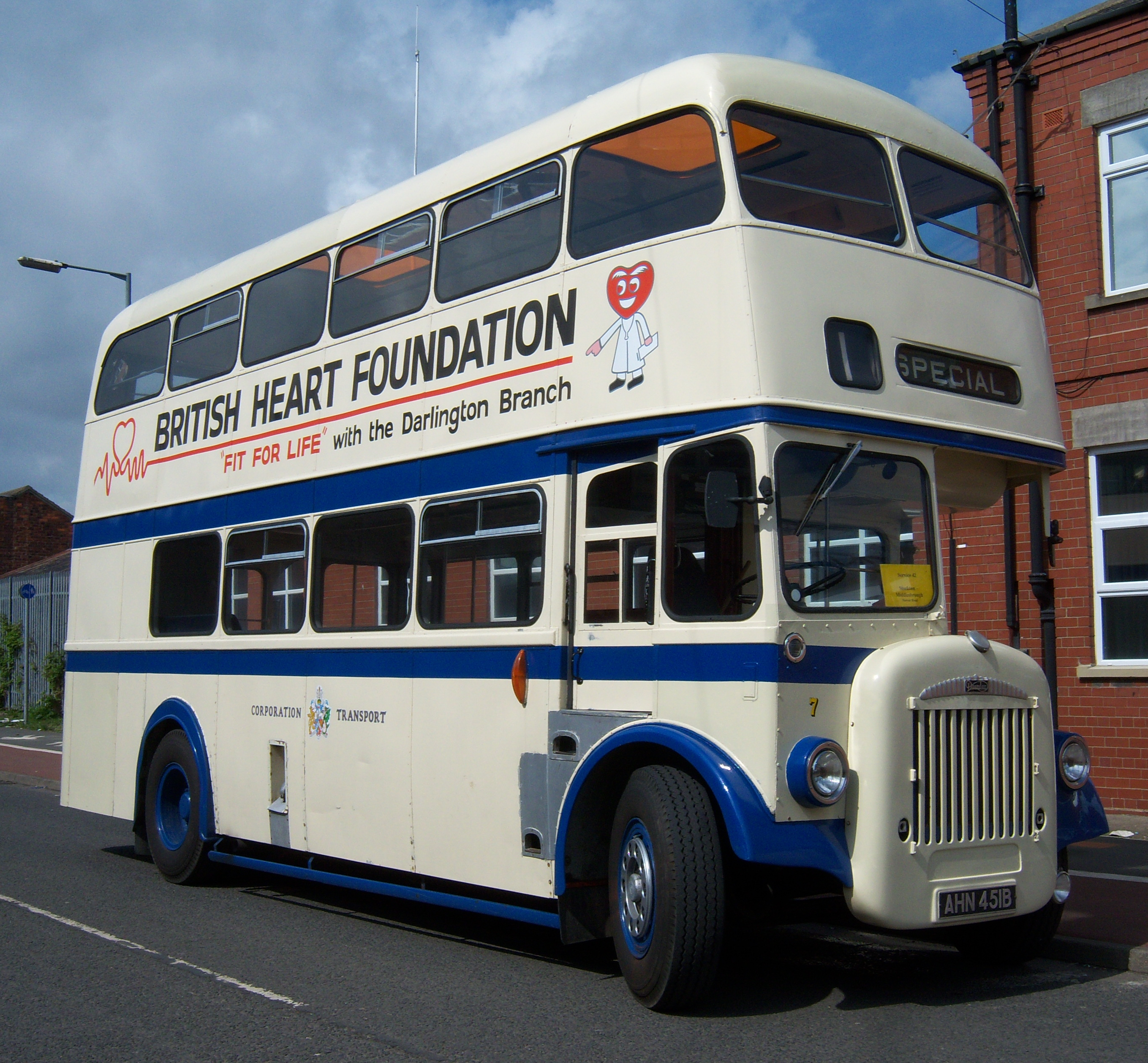
Preserved Darlington Corporation Daimler CCG5 in 2012

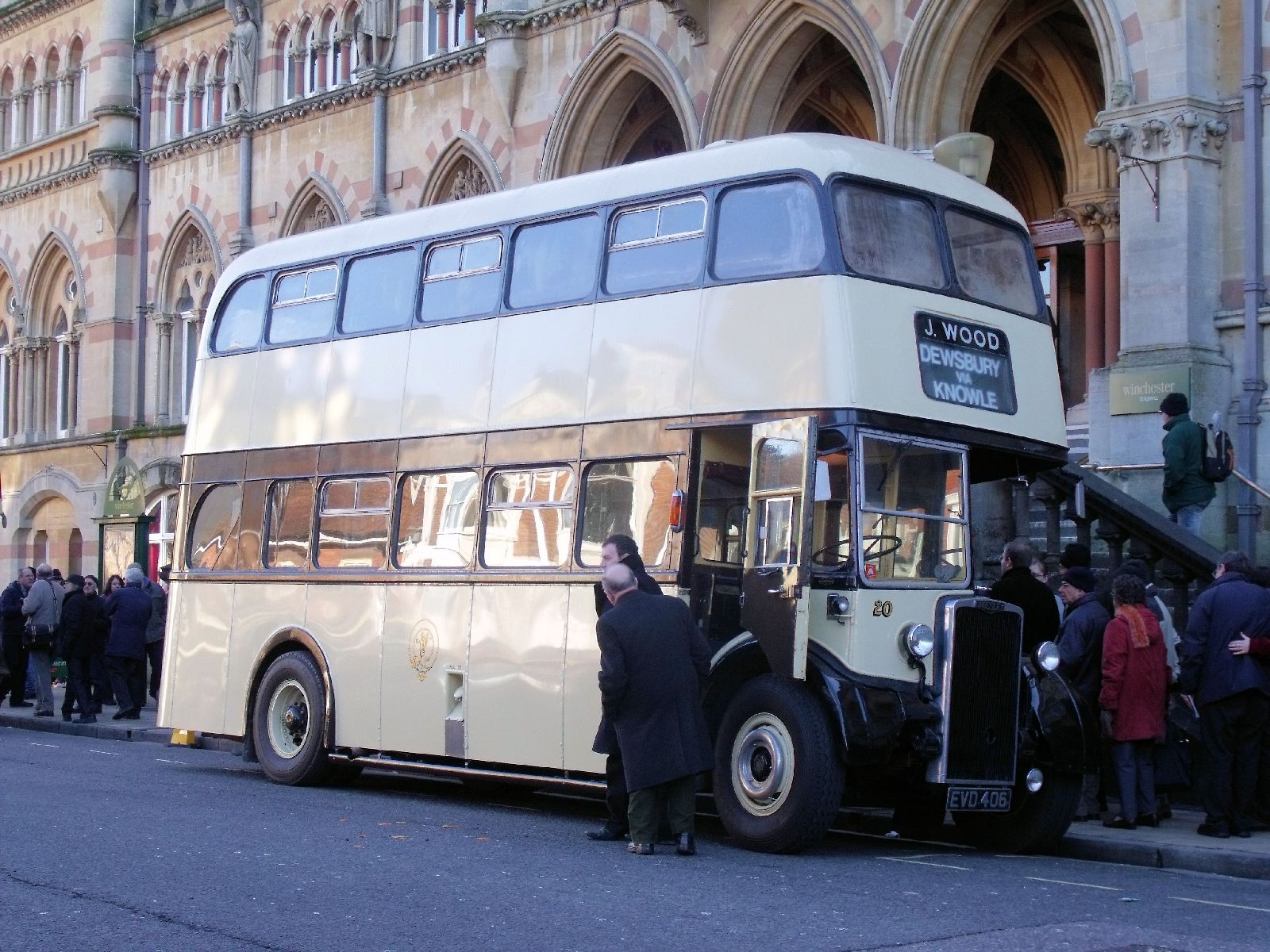
Preserved Crossley

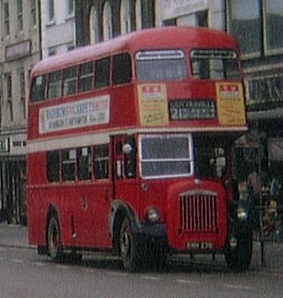
Northampton Corporation Daimler CVG6 in April 1972

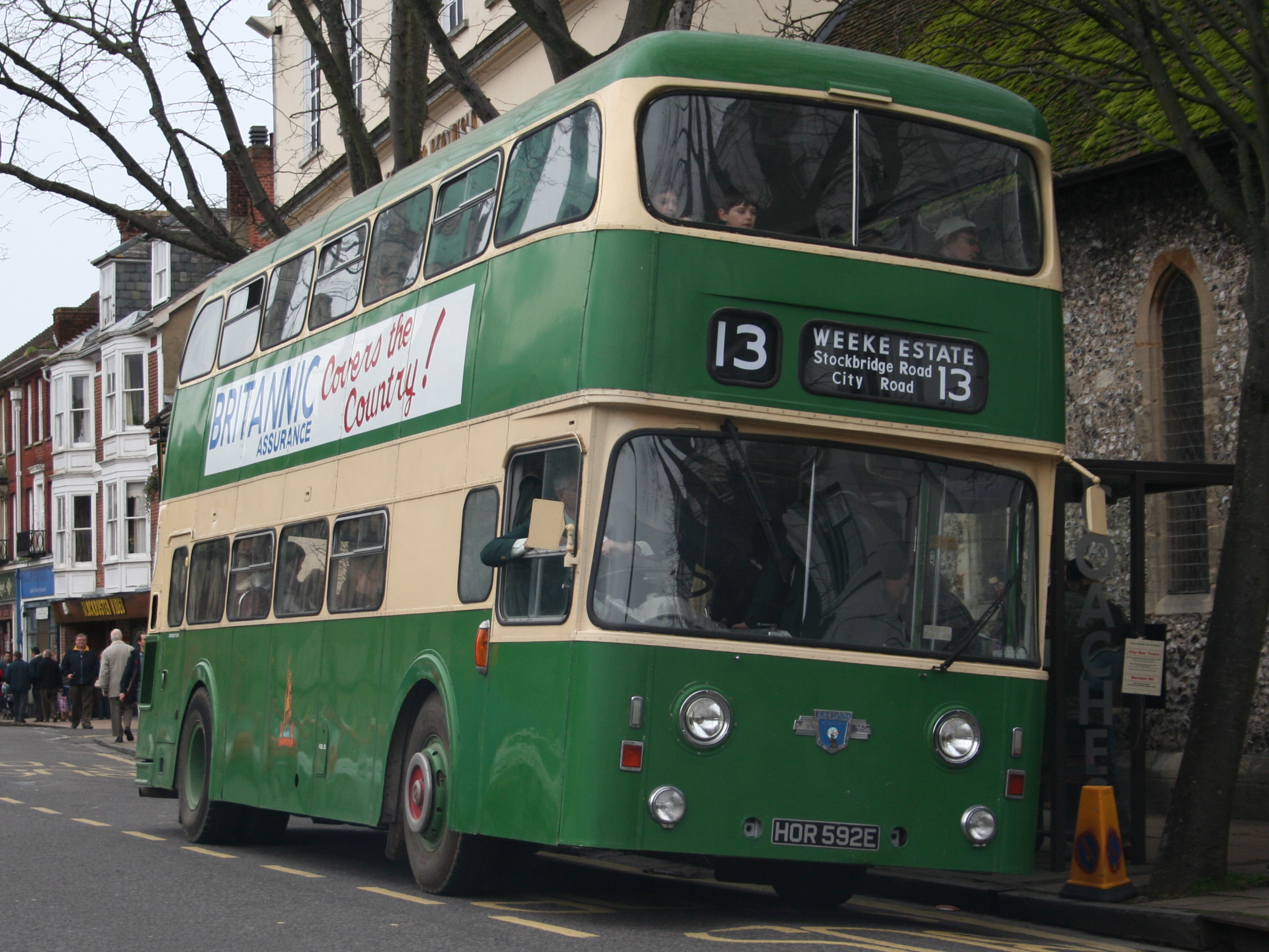
Preserved Leyland Atlantean in 2007

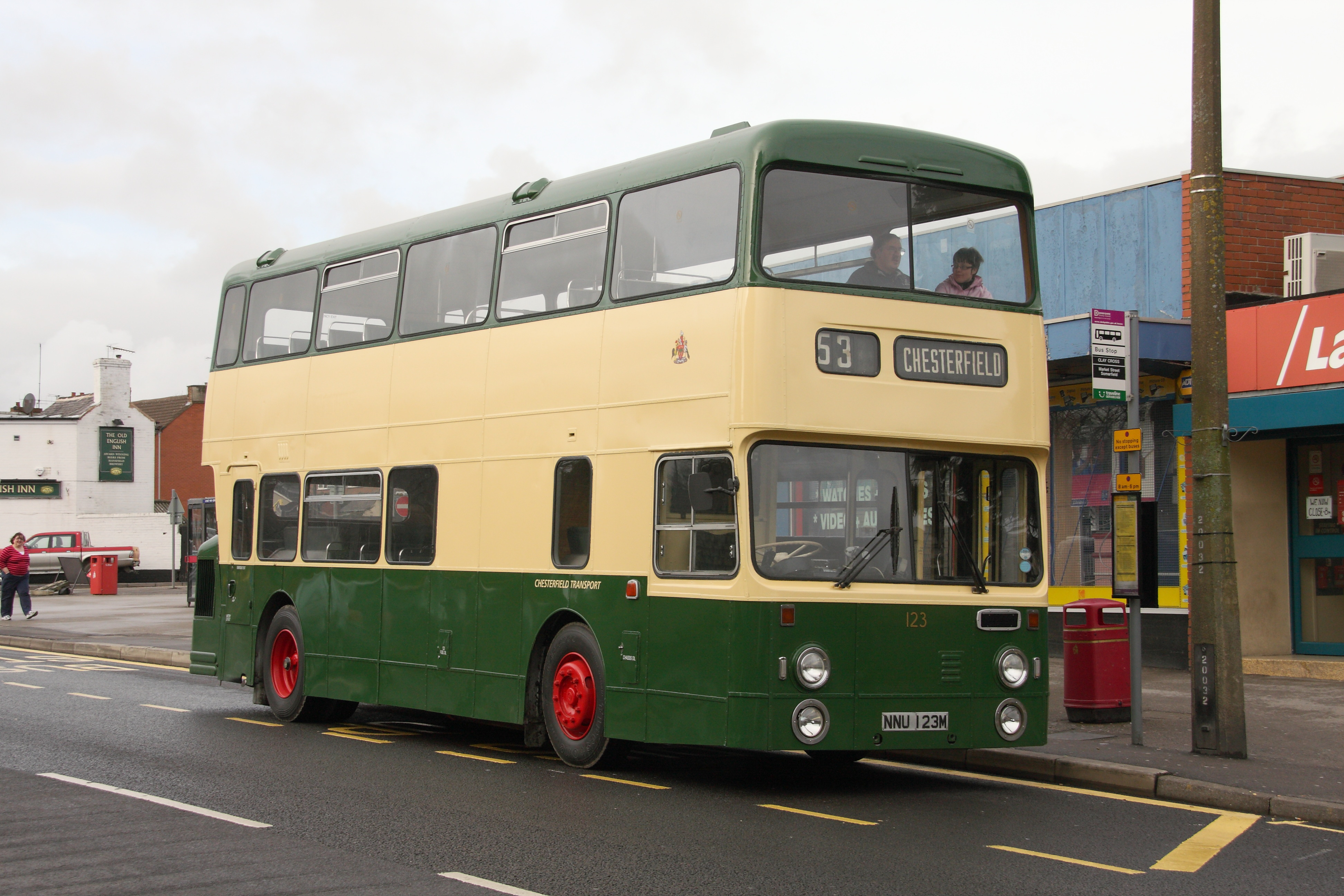
Preserved Daimler Fleetline in January 2009

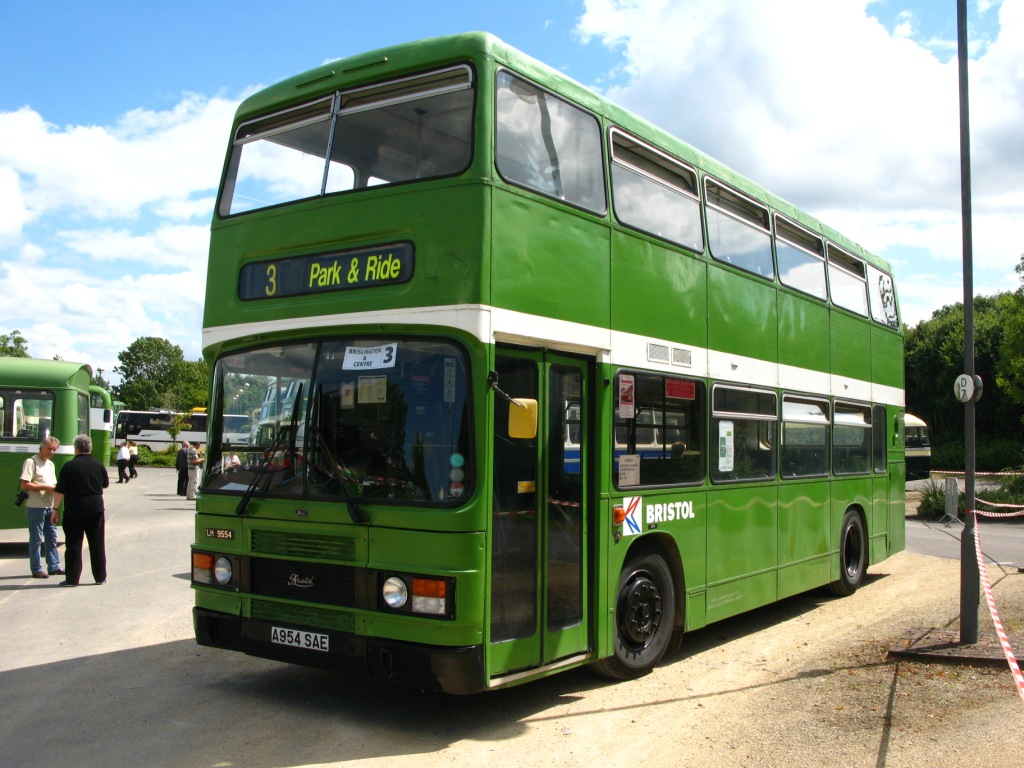
Preserved Bristol Omnibus Company Leyland Olympian in August 2011

Charles Henry Roe was a coachbuilder, draughtsman, engineer and entrepreneur who established a coachworks business bearing his name in Leeds, Yorkshire in 1917. He continued to be its managing director until 1952. Charles H. Roe Limited produced distinctive and durable coachwork which although associated most strongly with municipal operators, particularly in Yorkshire, sold to a wide range of bus, trolleybus and coach operators, and there were even a few car, railway carriage, tram and commercial vehicle bodies too. Eventually becoming a wholly owned subsidiary of British Leyland in 1982 it was closed in September 1984. Former workers and management pooled their redundancy money and in 1985 returned to the Roe factory in Leeds with a new bus-building business under the new name of Optare.

== History ==
=== Early years ===
Charles Henry Roe was born 22 May 1887 in York. His father Charles Roe worked for the North Eastern Railway at their carriage works in the town, eventually rising to a foreman's position. C.H. Roe served his apprenticeship at the drawing office of the carriage works and his first job after gaining his trade in 1912 was as a draughtsman at the Wakefield works of Charles Roberts & Company who built railway rolling stock. A year later he moved to Leeds to work as an assistant to the chief engineer at the Hunslet-based RET Construction Co who was a pioneer builder of trolleybuses. Whilst there he worked on a twin-shaft drive transmission system from the traction motors of the trolleybus chassis to replace a previous chain-drive arrangement and designed a lightweight body featuring steel panels over a suitably reinforced teak body frame. As an engineer and draughtsman he was exempt from World War I conscription. Customers for the RET vehicle with Roe-designed bodies included the trolleybus systems of Bloemfontein Corporation, the Shanghai Transport Company and Ramsbottom Urban District Council. The Ramsbottom examples were to a steel-frame design but it was wood and metal composite construction particularly using teak that became synonymous with the C.H. Roe name. The RET business had gone through one bankruptcy prior to C.H. Roe joining, originally having been founded as the Railless Electric Traction Company Ltd in 1908. In 1916, the RET Company was required under war regulations to turn over production to munitions and being unable to supply orders in hand for trolleybuses was closed down in 1917.

=== Sole trader ===
By August 1917 C.H. Roe had set up on his own account as an engineer and coachbuilder in a nearby factory unit. Always an innovator with a shrewd grasp of the value of intellectual property Roe applied for his first patent (relating to driving pulleys) on Armistice Day 11 November 1918. During this time Roe continually extended his site, which adjoined that of his former employer which had now been requisitioned by the Royal Flying Corps. As a sole trader, Roe built a wide variety of products from simple flatbed trailers for traction engines to a refrigerated mobile fish shop body and stylish charabanc bodies on the ubiquitous Ford Model T. Another early patent was for a tipping body for lorries (spelt in true Yorkshire style 'lurries' in the application) with compartments to allow discrete loads to be kept separate. Railless Ltd had reformed after the war to build trolleybuses and Roe designed and/or built bodies went on examples supplied to the North Ormesby, South Bank, Normanby & Grangetown Railless Traction Company and to York Corporation.

=== The first company ===
Expansion at the Hunslet site was by the end of 1919 impossible, but C.H. Roe lived with his wife in the Cross Gates area of the city of Leeds and knew that a large shell-filling factory there had been vacated by the government. Thus for the purpose of purchasing this large site with a modern factory building and space for expansion he registered Charles H Roe Limited on 26 May 1920. The shareholders included his father and a number of family friends. Whilst the formation of the company and negotiations to buy the Cross Gates site commenced, coachbuilding continued at the Hunslet factory, bodies including Charabancs on Karrier and Lancia chassis. After taking possession of the Cross Gates site the first Roe double-deck bodies were built for Birmingham Corporation on Railless chassis, a second trolleybus maker to patronise Roe was Clough, Smith whose trolleybuses comprised their Leeds-built electrical equipment on Straker-Squire chassis and were hence known as Straker-Clough; Roe bodies supplied to them were then supplied to the Teesside Railless Traction Board (a municipal joint committee who had taken over the North Ormesby Company) and Rotherham Corporation. Other products of this era included a number of charabancs on chassis including Leyland, Thornycroft and Fiat and a stylish limousine on a Lancia chassis. All types of bodies from other builders were also repaired and painted.

Trading difficulties in the early 1920s recession affected many businesses, the under-capitalised original Roe company being just one, during 1921 two debentures had to be secured to continue trading, the second relating directly to the Birmingham Corporation double deckers. Unfortunately it wasn't enough and the first company was voluntarily wound-up after a directors' meeting in November 1922. The receiver of the original company was able to give the bank a small surplus, whilst among the debts received £3,000 had come from various other purchasers plus £900 from Railless Ltd, who had subcontracted the Birmingham bodybuilding contract to Roe. Late payment can kill many a new business and it seems to have been the death of the original Roe company. C.H. Roe in a personal capacity bought the remaining assets from the receiver for £1,140.

=== Charles H Roe (1923) Limited ===
==== The early years ====
One lesson had been learned in the formation of the second company (initially Charles H. Roe (1923) Limited) in that share capital was one third larger (£8,500 rather than £5,850). At this time motorbus, rather than trolleybus or charabanc bodies began to assume a greater prominence. Like trolleybuses however a lot of the coachbuilding work on motorbuses was subcontracted either from the chassis manufacturer or from a dealership company. Thus many early Roe bus bodies on Karrier chassis were sold by the Huddersfield company as complete products.

An even more complicated situation arose with the Leeds-based operation Tramway Supplies Ltd. They tendered for complete vehicles and then subcontracted the chassis supply to one manufacturer and the body supply to another. One of the body subcontractors was the Blackburn Aircraft who also had a factory in Leeds. They built their last bus bodies in 1924, just as Government orders for aircraft (particularly flying boats, a Blackburn specialty) began to pick up. Railless Ltd (the third Railless company) were, incidentally, backed by Short Brothers another aeroplane manufacturer with a specialism in flying boats and a sideline in bus bodies.

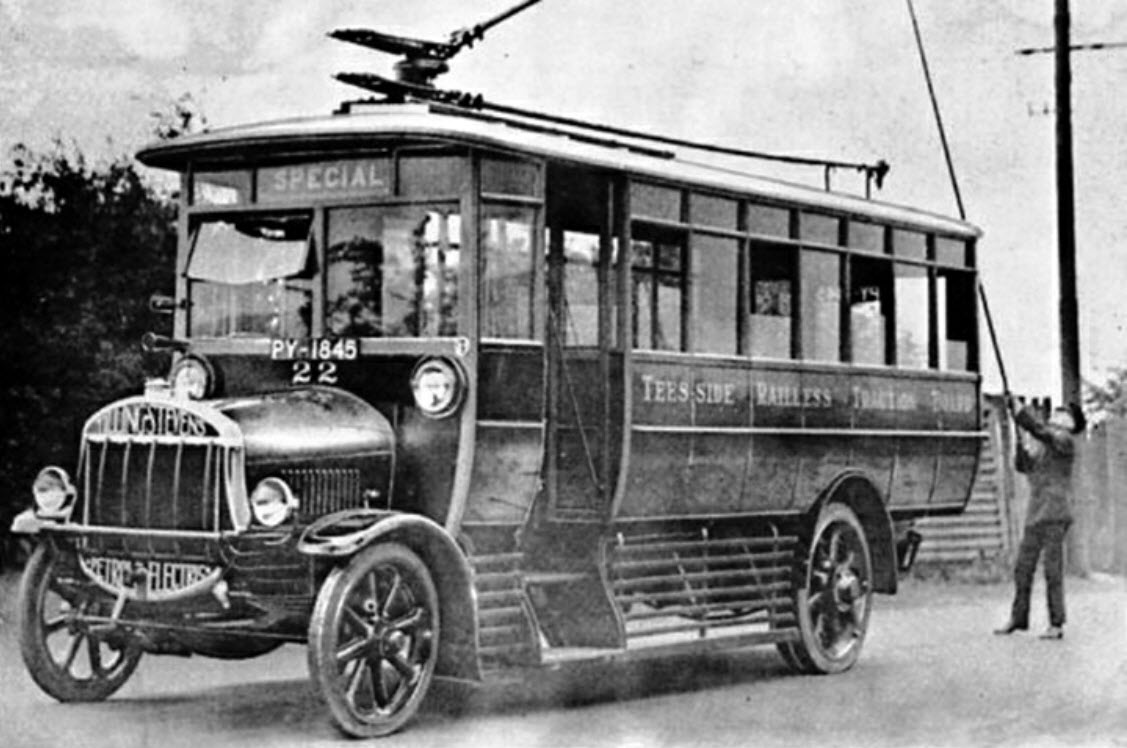
Bi-mode bus PERC1 for Teesside Railless Traction Board

An example of how complicated the situation could get concerns a Tilling-Stevens bi-mode petrol-electric/trolley bus (type PERC1) built-for and patented-by the Teesside Railless Traction Board's manager. Tilling-Stevens had contracted to supply a complete vehicle; they then subcontracted the body to Tramway Supplies who sub-subcontracted it to Blackburn, who sub-sub-subcontracted it to Roe.

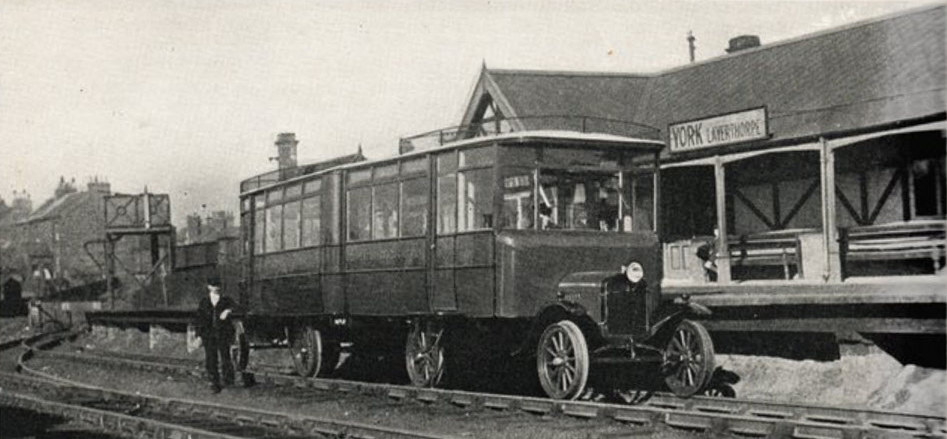
Ford Rail Motor Train at York Layerthorpe railway station

Other work in the early years of the new company included in 1924 a 36-seat petrol-fuelled rail vehicle for the Derwent Valley Light Railway. It was based on two Ford Model T chassis fitted with flanged steel tyres and coupled back-to-back, this rail minibus or petrol multiple unit seated 18 in each carriage and was driven from one end only, the rearward-facing car running in neutral gear with the engine switched off. When worked coupled fuel consumption was stated to be 14.33 mpg and if one unit was run the even more efficient figure of 17.55 mpg was obtained. It was not enough to maintain passenger operations on the line however, and the units were exported in 1926 to the County Donegal Railways Joint Committee (CDR) in northwestern Ireland who converted them to 3 ft gauge, lowering the bodies in the process. The CDR thus became the first railway in Ireland to use internal combustion engines and by the time of closure ran all passenger services and a number of freights using Gardner-powered diesel units.

By 1925 Roe were receiving orders directly from municipal bus companies, many of them previous customers for sub-contracted bodies, Mr Roe's approachability during body construction may have played a part in this, letters from general managers of the time thank C.H. Roe for his enabling inspection of bodies in-build. Among municipals taking Roe bodies by this time were Ramsbottom, Rotherham, Northampton, Doncaster, Leeds, Oldham, Bradford and the Teesside Railless Board, most of whom would continue to be Roe customers for a long time; chassis included Bristol, Guy, Thornycroft and AEC. The first double-deck motorbuses were for Doncaster in 1925 on AEC, a year later Roe were building 30 ft-long six wheeled double-decks for Oldham on Guy chassis. Unlike Londonat the time all of Roe's double-deck customers specified closed-tops on the upper deck. In 1926 Straker-Squire finally folded and Roe stored uncompleted vehicles for Clough, Smith prior to a new arrangement which saw their electrical equipment fitted to Karrier chassis. Also at this time Roe started building enclosed, or saloon, coaches which were often fitted to chassis which had previously carried charabanc bodies, Roe having a surplus of second-hand charabanc bodies by 1925. Two further debentures were called for, but this time it wasn't to keep the business going, but to fund the expansion of the premises.

==== Independent prosperity ====
One of the more significant patents to emerge from Cross Gates was number 313720 registered in 1928 the name of the company, Mr C.H Roe and Mr William Bramham, the works manager who was later to be general manager at Eastern Coach Works at Lowestoft, Northern Coachbuilders of Newcastle upon Tyne and Saunders-Roe of Beaumaris. This concerned a continuous machined teak waist rail designed to double-interlock with the vertical teak pillars and the steel reinforcing strips, once assembled also binding those to the outer panels; it could be accurately described as an early example of system-built coachwork. New chassis makes bodied in the late 1920s included Albion and Crossley, both of whom chose Roe bodies for demonstrators, in Crossley's case for its first double-decker. Trolleybuses continued to figure, makes including Karrier-Clough and Guy, the three-axled double deck now being the common form for these, customers including Bloemfontein, South Lancashire Transport and corporation fleets including some detailed above, Doncaster for example taking one of the only two Bristol trolleybuses with a Roe body in 1928.

Another significant patent was jointly granted in 1930 to the company, Mr Roe and J.C. Whitely the general manager of Grimsby Corporation for a central entrance double decker with a distinctive design of staircase which rose transversely two steps to a wide landing and then branched into forward and rearward ascending longitudinal flights to the upper deck. Roe built bodies to this style until 1950 and licencees included H. V. Burlingham of Blackpool.

In 1934 five years after the original company was wound up, the board agreed to remove the (1923) from the current company name. At the same time share capital rose to £12,000 and the current mortgages and debenture were repaid in favour of a new first mortgage.

In 1935, encouraged by the chassis builder, a Commercial Motor Show exhibit was built on an AEC Regent I chassis for Leeds Corporation, this bus had a rakish streamlined outline and a full-width cab but more importantly had an all-new steel framework patented by the company, Roe and Bramham (who became a director that year) and a 'Safety Staircase' patented by the company, Roe, Bramham and William Vane Moreland, the general manager of Leeds City Transport. This staircase on a rear platform bus gave less loss of seating capacity than the straight staircase favoured in London and Birmingham but intruded less onto the boarding platform than the normal semi-spiral arrangement whilst being superior to either layout in having two broad landings allowing boarding and alighting passengers to pass on the staircase. It became a standard feature of all subsequent peacetime Roe double-deck bodies for Leeds Corporation and was widely employed by other fleets, 777 examples being built by Roe prior to expiry of the patent in 1950.

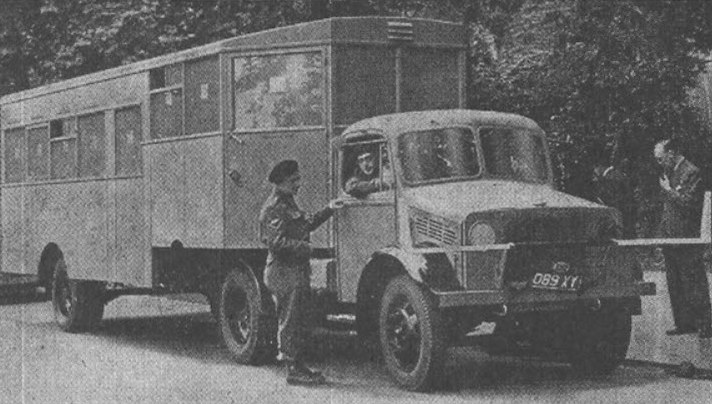
Bevin-Bus

During World War II, Roe mainly continued to build passenger bodies, although supplying the war effort more directly with such specialised bodywork as mobile printing presses for field communications use on Foden lorries and articulated mobile kitchens, canteens and dormitories to assist blitzed factories. These were on semi-trailer chassis coupled to Bedford tractor units. Similar bus-seated vehicles were built mainly for use within Ordnance factories (where they became known as Bevin buses) but two were supplied to Liverpool Corporation and briefly used as service buses (1942–44) before being converted to mobile canteens. More normal passenger vehicle bodies were built during the war to the Government-mandated 'utility' outline including 240 single-deck 32 seaters on Bedford OWB chassis and over 400 double-deck bodies on Guy and Daimler motorbuses and Sunbeam trolleybuses, most to the sunken upper deck offside gangway or lowbridge layout.

In 1945 nominal share capital increased to £108,000 and the valuation of the works increased to £98,000. In 1939 both the English Electric Company and Metro Cammell Weymann had approached Roe about amalgamation or takeover and in 1945 talks were opened with Mumford of Lydney in Gloucestershire. These talks were inconclusive but in 1947 Park Royal Vehicles bought a controlling shareholding in the company, three Roe board members were replaced by Park Royal directors and C.H Roe joined the board of Park Royal. In 1949 Park Royal were taken over by Associated Commercial Vehicles by then the parent company of AEC, Crossley and Maudslay.

==== The ACV years ====
Although ACV owned three chassis manufacturers and three coachbuilders (Park Royal, Roe and Crossley) they did not try to tie the hands of customers. Some rationalisation happened early in that any orders for Park Royal composite bodies were transferred to Roe, and steel-framed bodies were either built by Park Royal or by Roe using Park Royal frames. By the mid-1950s all metal-framed bodies by ACV, regardless of coachbuilder, had a Park Royal outline.

The flagship of the Roe composite body range was however exclusively built on AEC Regent III; this was the Pullman body, the only Roe bus ever to be named. The prototype – a Leeds bus to the specifications of W. Vane Moreland – with its deep windows and four window bays rather than the then standard five had looked ultra-modern when shown on a pre-war Regent at the 1937 Commercial Motor Show in London, it is an acknowledged influence on the London Transport designers whose RT1 appeared two years later with similar construction and outline.

Trolleybuses continued to figure, on Sunbeam/Karrier, Crossley or BUT chassis. The most striking of these were the Coronation class vehicles built on Sunbeam MF2B chassis for Kingston upon Hull Corporation Transport. These had a front entrance on the front overhang and a central exit; they were fitted with twin staircases and were intended to be one-man operated so were equipped with trolley-pole retriever equipment at the rear.

After the initial post-war boom Roe also took on a great deal of repair, rebuilding and refurbishment work, adding a workshop for this purpose. Plymouth Corporation had its entire fleet of Guy Arab utility buses thoroughly rebuilt by Roe, some 100 passing through the works. Roe also extended the Brush or Metro-Cammell bodies of Midland Red's post-war underfloor engined single deckers from 27 ft 6in to 29 ft 3in, allowing an extra four seats to be fitted. This work covered classes S6, S8, S9, S11 and all but one of S10, a grand total of 455 buses all converted in 1952 or 1953. In 1952 Charles H Roe resigned from the position of managing director, although he remained as chairman.

As pressure of work eased Roe also introduced a coach body for the AEC Reliance. This was known as the Roe Dalesman and ran through four separate marks, from 1953 to 1959. It was mainly stock-built for coach dealers selling to small independents but major operators to use the type included West Riding Automobile Company and Black and White Motorways. Other specialist work undertaken included two single deck trams for Leeds, a mobile chest X-ray unit for tuberculosis control and crew cab lorries on Ford Thames Trader for the Uganda police force. Box vans were supplied on Bedford to the Bradford Dyers Association.

The composite body had been revised post-war, with a new patent waist rail, the teak structural member now covered by rolled steel plate. In 1957 the composite double decker reached its final form with teak framing to the lower deck ceiling or upper deck floor and an aluminium framework above. This was to continue in production, mainly on Daimler half-cab chassis until 1968, the last batch being built for Northampton Corporation on CVG6, replacing earlier Roe-bodied CVG6s which at the time comprised the entire Northampton fleet, all but five having composite bodies.

Simultaneously Park Royal bowed to pressure from the British Electric Traction (BET) group of major regional bus operators and replaced their rather elegant mid-1950s aluminium-framed body with a steel-framed structure of very angular outline, this first appeared as the production version of the integral AEC Bridgemaster, but soon spread to all other steel-framed Park Royal and Roe double deckers. Crossley had been closed by ACV in 1958, having ceased to make chassis five years previously.

Roe metal-framed bodies to this new outline went on a wide range of double deck chassis. A large batch were built for BET on the new Leyland Atlantean, these were delivered in 1960 to Trent Motor Traction, Devon General and the Northern General Transport group. As well as looking ungainly these buses became notorious for their propensity to corrode. Roe also built both forward and rear entrance bodies using this structure on conventional chassis, Swindon Corporation taking Daimler CVG6 and both Yorkshire Traction and Stratford Blue Motors taking rebodied Leyland Tigers.

Far less conventional was the Guy Wulfrunian which was even more avant-garde than the Atlantean, it was designed to the requirements of the independent West Riding company and featured a front engine on the front entrance platform, instead of a front radiator it had two Cave-Browne-Cave heat exchangers on the upper deck front face to provide passenger heating and ventilation as well as engine cooling. The front wheels had double wishbone independent suspension and like the rear axle had a self-levelling air suspension system, the foundation braking was by disc brakes on all four wheels with a drum brake on the driveshaft providing the parking brake and the fluid flywheel adapted to serve as an integral retarder. At a time when only Jaguar and Ferrari road cars had front discs this was a technological adventure, like the AEC Routemaster and Midland Red's motorway coach it was shown with its Roe body in a cutaway-centre spread of boy's comic The Eagle where it took its place alongside V-Bombers, nuclear submarines and Deltic locomotives. Roe bodied 131 out of the 137 Wulfruninans built from 1959 to 1965.

The Wulfrunian body was lower built as this chassis was designed as a low height bus with stepless entrance and centre gangways on both decks. Roe also softened the outline of the body with a subtly curved rear dome; the use of equal-depth windows on both decks produced a much more balanced look. Of the 131 Roe-bodied Wulfrunians built, only two survive and both are in the Dewsbury Bus Museum collection.

Other oddities at the dawn of the 1960s included single-deck buses on the double-deck AEC Regent V chassis, most of these were built for South Wales Transport for a route with a very low railway bridge in Llanelli under which underfloor engined single decks could not work but there were also one each for the Leeds Council Welfare department (with a rear ramp for wheelchair access) and for the Coal Industry Social Welfare Organisation.

In 1962 ACV merged with Leyland Motors to form the Leyland Motor Corporation. In 1965 LMC sold a 30% shareholding in Park Royal Vehicles and Charles H Roe to the state-owned Transport Holding Company in return for a 25% stake in Bristol Commercial Vehicles and Eastern Coach Works.

By 1939 Charles & Kathleen Roe were living in Boston Hall, Boston Spa. Charles H Roe retired as company chairman in 1962 and died in 1965.

==== The mixed economy ====
The original outline of the body for rear-engined double deckers was widely considered unsatisfactory and Sunderland Corporation took a heavily revised version on Daimler Fleetline from 1962 to 1966 featuring a prominent peak at the front dome and a reverse rake to the upper-deck rear in the style of the contemporary Ford Anglia saloon car. Great Yarmouth Corporation instead specified double curvature windscreens of Alexander design on its Leyland Atlanteans (including a unique short-wheelbase batch in 1967) and on the last three Daimler Freeline single deckers. This then became a standard option at Roe who also optionally fitted the Alexander style double-curvature upper-deck front window on rear engined chassis, curving the line of the foremost upper deck side windows down to meet this, producing an elegant style which suited the Fleetline and the post 1964 low height Atlantean. Also in 1964 for that year's Commercial Motor show Roe built its first body to the 36 ft length permissible since 1961, it was an early Leyland Panther for the Kingston upon Hull Corporation Transport fleet. Unlike the Coronation trolleybuses they were to replace, the Hull Panthers were allowed to be one man operated. Roe then built versions of this body for Leeds on the similar AEC Swift from 1967 to 1972 and also built standee single decks on Daimler Roadliner and Fleetline for Darlington and on Seddon Pennine RU for Doncaster.

In 1964 Leeds, the last provincial bastion of the rear-open platform double decker took a batch of Fleetlines to Great Yarmouth outline and the first of these was also shown at the 1964 show, Leeds continually revised this design over the next few years, in 1966 it was extended to 33 ft long rather than the previous 30 ft 10in, both decks had double curvature screens and side glazing became panoramic, with double-width window glasses. In 1968 angled flat glass at the front and a glass-fibre dash was added and a centre exit was fitted whilst the rear dome reverted to a square outline. This made the appearance similar to the Oldham Corporation variant supplied with conventional side glazing on standard wheelbase Atlanteans since 1965. The Leeds design was produced until 1975 with a few going to independent operators in England and Scotland. The Leeds and Oldham designs in turn led to the Park Royal–Roe standard design for Atlantean and Fleetline built from 1969 to 1981, which had a deeper front screen optionally to Alexander layout or flat-glazed and wider pillar spacing than the previous standard but not as long as that fitted to the Leeds style or the Manchester Corporation Mancunian. Roe built one batch of 34 Mancunians on long Fleetlines in 1972. These buses had been due to be bodied by East Lancashire Coachbuilders in 1970, but they suffered a fire destroying their works in Blackburn, so the contract was transferred to Park Royal, who in turn transferred it to Roe.

The standard design was adopted by West Yorkshire Passenger Transport Executive (successor to the Leeds, Bradford, Huddersfield Halifax and Calderdale fleets) and many municipals and also (from 1972) on the AN68 Atlantean became the National Bus Company's second-choice double decker, being especially associated with 'Leyland' fleets such as Ribble Motor Services, Northern General and Southdown Motor Services but it also became the standard double decker with London Country who had over 300.

==== Nearing the end ====
In 1982 Leyland Vehicles, the truck and bus division of the by now state-owned British Leyland bought out the National Bus Company's 50% shareholding in the joint-venture Bus Manufacturers Holdings Ltd which had not only owned Bristol, ECW, Park Royal and Roe but also the Leyland National factory at Workington.

In 1981 and 1982 Roe-bodied six 18-metre long articulated buses for British Airways, these employed Leyland National body sections on Leyland-DAB underfloor-engined chassis, Roe modifying the body for the higher frame height. They featured five entry-exit doors, two on the offside, and were used to transport passengers from their aircraft to the terminal at Heathrow Airport.

In 1981, production peaked at Roe, with 182 bodies built, the highest total since 1966 (the year when double-decks were finally allowed to be operated without a conductor, the first bus to do so, on the day of the law change, being a Great Yarmouth Roe-bodied Atlantean). The standard body was phased out in 1981, as the Fleetline had been discontinued and the Atlantean could not be sold after 1983 as it fell foul of noise-pollution laws. In 1981 the Park Royal coachworks were closed. The new body to take its place was for the new Leyland Olympian chassis and Roe produced 299 of these prior to closure. Most went to three fleets, West Yorkshire PTE and NBC subsidiaries Bristol Omnibus Company and London Country, with one batch to Strathclyde Passenger Transport Executive and a sole vehicle to the Scottish Arts Council, which was equipped as a travelling art gallery.

Production peaked at this point, because the Government was phasing out the New Bus Grant which had provided up to 50% of the cost of a bus used on local services, provided it met certain rules. In order to compensate for this drop in bus sales, Leyland Bus (as it had now become) decided to produce a new flagship product for the booming deregulated coach market, following the Transport Act 1980. This was the Royal Tiger underframe and the Roe Doyen body. This was a sophisticated product, as the Tiger coach chassis competed head-on with the Volvo B10M. The Royal Tiger Doyen was designed to provide a British alternative to the high-end Setra coach from Germany. Production got off to a slow start, not helped by overly centralised control from Leyland and a rigid set of body specifications, which did not initially provide all the features more demanding coach customers wanted. In 1983, the year of launch, only 10 complete Royal Tiger Doyens entered service, a further 13 underframes being supplied to Van Hool and Plaxton to receive versions of their standard coachwork. In 1983, production of the underframe was moved to Workington and 22 coaches were completed by Roe, as well as 86 Olympians. The plant was not at that point viable for British Leyland, who had been impoverished by the chronic failure of its Austin mass-production car division. It closed on 17 September 1984, thus, Roe followed Daimler, Guy, AEC, Park Royal and Bristol into oblivion.

Former workers and management pooled their redundancy money and in February 1985 returned to the Roe factory in Cross Gates with a new bus-building business under the new name of Optare. The factory closed in 2011 when Optare relocated and was demolished in 2012.

Many Roe bodies survive in preservation and some on special tourist services, the earliest design being a replica of a 1929 body on a Leyland Lion at the Museum of Transport, Greater Manchester.

Three diecast model manufacturers produce 1:76 scale models of Roe vehicles, EFE have a pre-war Leyland Tiger bus, Corgi OOC produce the final style of rear entrance composite body as a half-cab or a trolleybus and Britbus make the NBC version of the standard Atlantean body in single or dual-door format.

== Recognition ==
In 2016, the Transport Yorkshire Preservation Group started a campaign to get some form of recognition for Mr Roe, after the Leeds Civic Trust had refused a request for a blue plaque on account of no original fabric remaining. The developer Avant Homes who built houses on the factory site did not respond to requests to allow a memorial garden. Pub developer Wetherspoons did however respond positively to lobbying and have agreed their forthcoming Cross Gates outlet, opened on 21 July 2020, would be named 'The Charles Henry Roe'.

== Text sources ==
Books

- Lumb, Charles H. Roe includes Optare, Shepperton 1999
- Kaye, Buses and Trolleybuses 1919–45, London 1970
- Roberts & Senior, Eastern Coach Works of Lowestoft- A Retrospect, Glossop 1995
- Curits, Olympian Bristol • Leyland • Volvo, Hersham 2010
- Booth, The British Bus Today and Tomorrow, Shepperton 1983

Magazines

- Buses Illustrated and Buses passim
- Classic Bus passim (but especially Harvey in Stenning (ed) Classic Bus 98 November 2008)
