= Daimler Freeline =

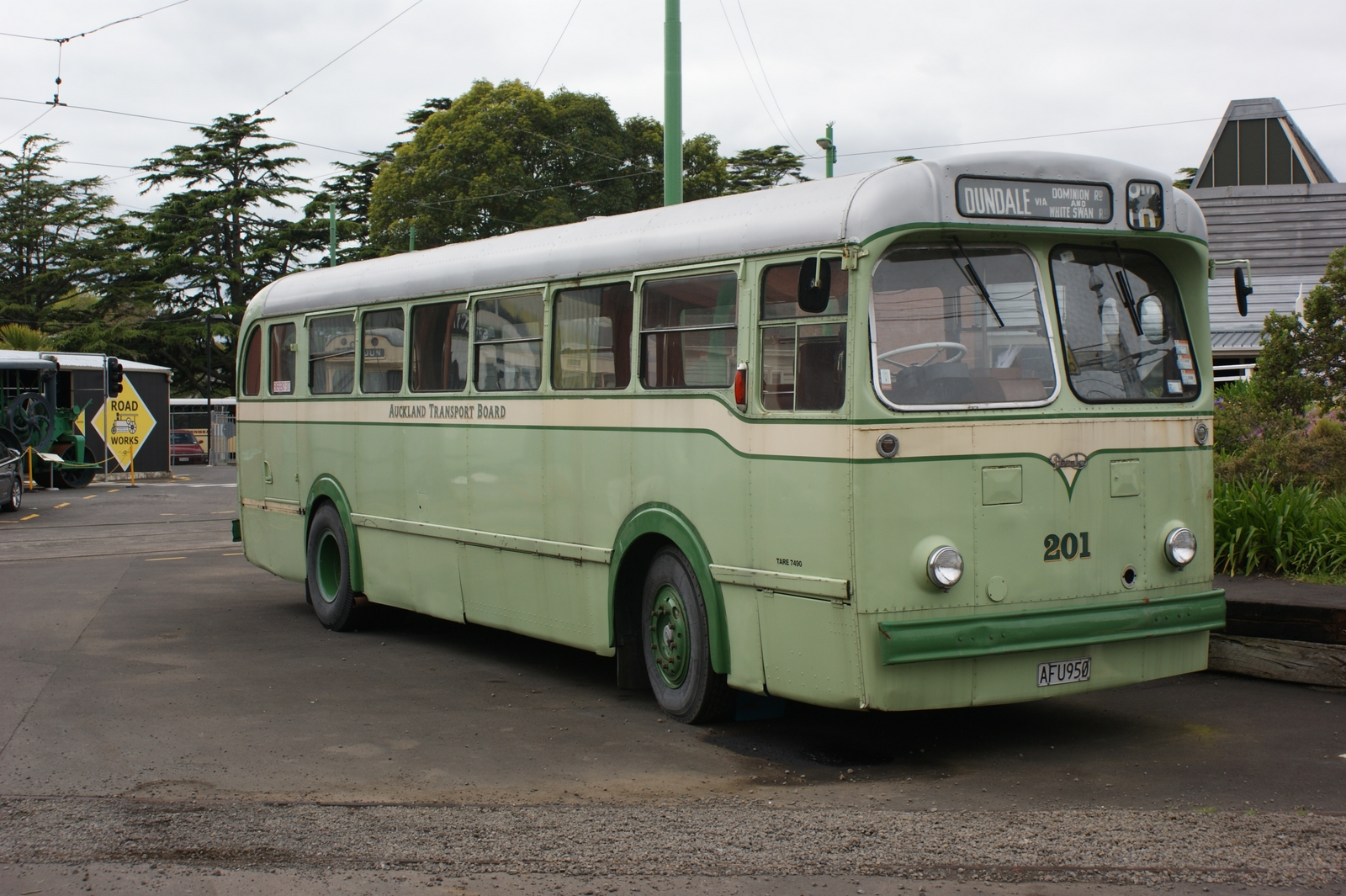
- Preserved Auckland Transport Board Daimler Freeline

Overview
- Manufacturer: Daimler
- Production: 1951–1964

Body and chassis
- Doors: 1 or 2
- Floor type: Step entrance

Powertrain
- Engine: Daimler D650H 10.5-litre Gardner 6HLW; Gardner 5HLW
- Transmission: Daimler/Self-Changing Gears 4 or 5 speed preselector Daimatic/Self-Changing Gears 4-speed direct-acting epicyclic

Dimensions
- Length: 30ft (home); 33ft & 36ft options for export markets

The Daimler Freeline was an underfloor-engined bus chassis built by Daimler between 1951 and 1964. It was a very poor seller in the UK market for an underfloor-engined bus and coach chassis, but became a substantial export success.

It was the first of only three Daimler PSV models to have a name, as well as an alphanumeric identity. The others were the Daimler Fleetline and the Daimler Roadliner.

== Background ==
The first underfloor-engined bus and coach chassis in Britain were built by Leyland Motors, Tilling-Stevens and the Associated Equipment Company in the years immediately prior to World War II. During wartime, the BMMO (Midland Red) company built prototypes for a substantial fleet of buses to this layout, which they built from 1946 for their own use: over 400 were in service by 1952.

The first manufacturer to offer this new, and more economic design, for general sale was Sentinel of Shrewsbury, from 1947, their models being of integral construction, as was the Leyland-MCW Olympic which followed, in 1948. In 1949, the Associated Equipment Company launched its Regal IV chassis. In 1950, Leyland Motors introduced the Leyland Royal Tiger, also a separate chassis.

The previous Daimler CVD6 half-cab single decker had sold well immediately after the war, particularly to coach operators and independent bus operators, neither of whom were previously core Daimler customers. When, in 1950, the permitted length of single deckers was relaxed, to a new maximum of 30 feet, the CVD6 was offered in a version for long bodies, but half-cabs were becoming obsolete on the home market.

In April 1950, Daimler announced that it would build an underfloor-engined bus and coach chassis. This was the Freeline. The first two were demonstrators. The first was a D650HS sent to HV Burlingham for bodying to the Seagull coach style, in March 1951. The second was bodied by Duple Coachbuilders in Hendon. It was exhibited on the Daimler stand at the 1951 Scottish Motor Show at the Kelvin Hall in Glasgow, in the livery of Edinburgh Corporation, whose general manager was eager to trial standee single deckers on busier routes.

== Description ==
Like its Leyland and AEC rivals, the Freeline had a high, straight ladder frame, made of substantial steel channel section, with an optional rear drop-frame extension for luggage boots on coaches, or standee platforms for urban buses.

Three power units were offered:

The 5HLW and 6HLW from L Gardner & Sons were also used in equivalent chassis by Guy Motors, Bristol Commercial Vehicles, and Atkinson and in an integral by Saunders-Roe. The 5HLW five-cylinder 7-litre engine developed 87 bhp, later uprated to 94 bhp, and the 6HLW 8.4-litre six-cylinder produced 102 bhp, later uprated to 112.

Models with these engines were coded G5HS and G6HS respectively.

Daimler also offered a purpose-built own-make engine for this model. This engine was called the D650H and was derived from the D650 engine used in the rare post-war CD650 double-decker. Swept volume was 10.6 litres, and the major difference from the vertical version of the engine was the sump casting. Parts commonality was such that CD650 operators could, and did, use the 'top end' of the horizontal engine when they could not get spares for the vertical version. Output was originally 125 bhp @ 1,650 rpm but this was soon raised to 150 bhp @ 2,000 rpm, which was class-leading power in 1953. The model code for this version was D650HS.

The axles was similar to those of the CD650, the rear axle being a substantial underslung worm unit, with the differential offset to the left.

Braking was originally full-power hydraulic on the controversial Lockheed Automotive Products continuous flow system, as employed on the CD650 and, as with that chassis, hydraulic-assistance could also be applied to the steering and the gear-selection pedal. The hydraulic system was unpopular with operators and air braking was 'quietly introduced' as an option in 1952. For the home market, only one wheelbase was offered: 16 ft 4ins for 30 ft by 8 ft bodywork. For export markets, a longer 17 ft 6in wheelbase (for 33 ft bodies) was standard, with a 20 ft 4ins version for 36 ft bodies introduced for markets where that length was permitted, in 1954.

Originally, the transmission was a Daimler five-speed preselector type (either overdrive-top or close-ratio with direct top, with four-speed optional) but, from 1957, the Daimatic direct operating semi-automatic transmission was available, with four forward speeds and this, with either electro-pneumatic or direct-air change-speed mechanism, soon became standard. Drive in both cases came from the engine, through a remotely mounted fluid flywheel.

The radiator was mounted vertically, directly behind the front wheels, and the semi-elliptic leaf springs were of substantial construction.

It soon became clear that the Freeline, like the Regal IV, Royal Tiger and Guy Arab UF, was over-engineered for UK operating conditions. A typical bodied 39-seat coach could weigh more than a 60-seat half-cab double-decker bus. Leyland, AEC and Guy developed lightweight chassis for the home market, but there was not to be a Daimler equivalent to the Leyland Tiger Cub, AEC Reliance or Guy Arab LUF. Geoffrey Hillditch, a well-known and respected passenger transport manager, who ordered the last Freelines built, expressed regret that Daimler did not build such a vehicle.

== Sales ==
=== Home market ===
Due to heavy weight of the Freeline, its sales in home market were disappointing. In Daimler's core market, in the British municipal sector, sales were little short of disastrous.

The Corporation fleets who purchased the Freeline were:

Operator	Number purchased	Variant	Bodybuilder	Year(s) purchased
SHMD	1	G6HS	Northern Counties	1952
Glasgow	1	D650HS	Alexander	1953
Cleethorpes	2	G6HS	Roe	1953, 1955
Swindon	4	D650HS	Park Royal	1954
Coventry	3	G6HS	Willowbrook	1959
Great Yarmouth	8	G6HS	Roe	1962, 1964

Total: 19 chassis.

Edinburgh Corporation had extended loan of LRW377 Daimler's demonstrator G6HS with a body by Duple Coachbuilders to a 30-seater dual-door standee layout with doors at front and rear, but they did not buy it and, when Daimler finished with it, it was sold to Samuel Ledgard, who added six more seats, but frequently found the brake system problematic.

The SHMD, Glasgow and Swindon Freelines carried centre-entrance standee bus bodies with 30 to 34 seats: the Cleethorpes ones having 43 seats and being fitted with front doors. The Coventry examples were C41F coaches as Coventry, unusually for a corporation, had authorisation to hire coaches to the general public. So did Great Yarmouth, whose two batches had DP43F bodies by Roe, the second batch with Alexander-style double-curvature windscreens.

For Daimler, in the first half of the 1950s, there were a number of private coach operators who were impressed by the large-engined Freeline's power (25 bhp more than Leyland and AEC) and refinement which was unsurpassed, even by the standards of previous Daimlers.

Around 50 D650HS entered service in Great Britain, as private-operator coaches, by the middle of the decade, although sales tailed off later. The hydraulic braking system (used originally) provided the greatest assistance to the driver at higher road speeds, and it did not respond well to repeated stop-start-operation. This aspect of the Freeline's character, perhaps explains its aptness to coaching applications, for the Freeline did not attract the reputation of being under-braked, a shortcoming which attached to the Regal IV and (especially) the vacuum-braked Royal Tiger coach.

Independent Freeline coach customers included Northern Roadways of Glasgow, Tailby & George (Blue Bus Service) of Willington, Derbyshire (who took one D650HS to add to England's second-largest fleet of CD650s and who later operated Roadliner coach TNU675F) and Burwell and District in Cambridgeshire, who were the most regular purchaser of Freeline coaches, taking five from 1953 to 1959 with Plaxton and Willowbrook bodies. Builders of home-market coaches on the Freeline chassis included Bellhouse-Hartwell, HV Burlingham, Duple, Mann Egerton, Plaxton and Willowbrook.

St Helens Co-operative Society were the purchaser of the Mann Egerton-bodied coach. This was to the Crellin-Duplex patented 'half-deck' layout. This involved facing pairs of seats for four passengers being interlaced either two steps above or below the central gangway, which enabled a height of less than 12 ft 6 in (3.81 m) and a seating capacity of 50, compared with a maximum of 43 for conventional single deck coaches.

=== Export market ===
Auckland Transport Board, Auckland, New Zealand was the greatest foreign purchaser of the Freeline, buying 160 of the D650HS model between 1952 and 1958, all being thirty-three feet long, with front and centre doors and luggage boxes below the saloon floor in the wheelbase outboard of the frames. The first was exported completely built up with a Saunders-Roe body. The other 89 of the initial batch were completely knocked down kits, which were assembled in New Zealand. The second batch of 70, from 1956 to 1958, were locally bodied.

Auckland had also ordered smaller batches of AEC Regal IVs, Leyland Royal Tigers and also BUT RETB/1 trolleybuses. The Daimlers had weaknesses, prone to overheating, but they were better performers than their diesel rivals and became the backbone of the Auckland fleet until the early 1970s and remained in service until 1983.

Other export markets for the Freeline included Australia, Belgium, India, Israel, Nigeria, Norway, Portugal, Spain and South Africa. The buses for Bombay were the only examples of the five-cylinder G5HS model built.

== Production total ==
A total of 650 Freelines were built, 558 of which were exported.

== Fake Freelines ==
In 1968 CCFL, in Lisbon, received 26 underfloor-engined single-deckers, which were described as Daimler CVU6LX. They were actually Guy Victories, powered by Gardner 6HLX engines, Jaguar having decided to badge-engineer in this way, as Daimler was the better known brand in Portugal, and these buses were delivered along with a consignment of Fleetlines for the same operator.

== Preservation ==
In the UK only 120 JRB Blue Bus Service of Willington (Tailby & George) fleet number Dr 18 is preserved and is currently subject of extensive restoration. Burwell & District Coach NVE 1 survives in poor condition as a garden shed, incomplete with major units removed.

In New Zealand, the Museum of Transport and Technology has preserved Auckland Transport Board prototype renumber 201. At least two other ATB buses, including 215 & 511 and are in private preservation in New Zealand. 511, built in 1956 is with A.R.A Heritage buses having been a camper and is to be restored as a passenger carrying bus once again. Several other ex-Auckland Freelines have also survived, some as motor homes, and one, at Ruapuke Beach, as an artwork.

In Australia, two have been preserved by the Bus Preservation Society of Western Australia, Perth. These were from the batch of 20 Freelines bodied by Howard Porter for the Western Australian Government Tramways (WAGT) in 1957/58. They are WAGT fleet numbers 143 and 147, which became Metropolitan Transport Trust (MTT) numbers 295 and 299 when the WAGT was absorbed by the MTT.

== Sources ==
- Townsin, Daimler, Shepperton 2000
- Kaye, Buses and Coaches Since 1945, London 1968
- Hillditch, Looking At Buses, Shepperton 1979
- Hillditch, A Further Look At Buses, Shepperton 1981
- Lumb, Charles H.Roe (includes Optare), Shepperton 1999
- Classic Bus
