= Leyland Panther =

British rear-engined single-decker bus chassis

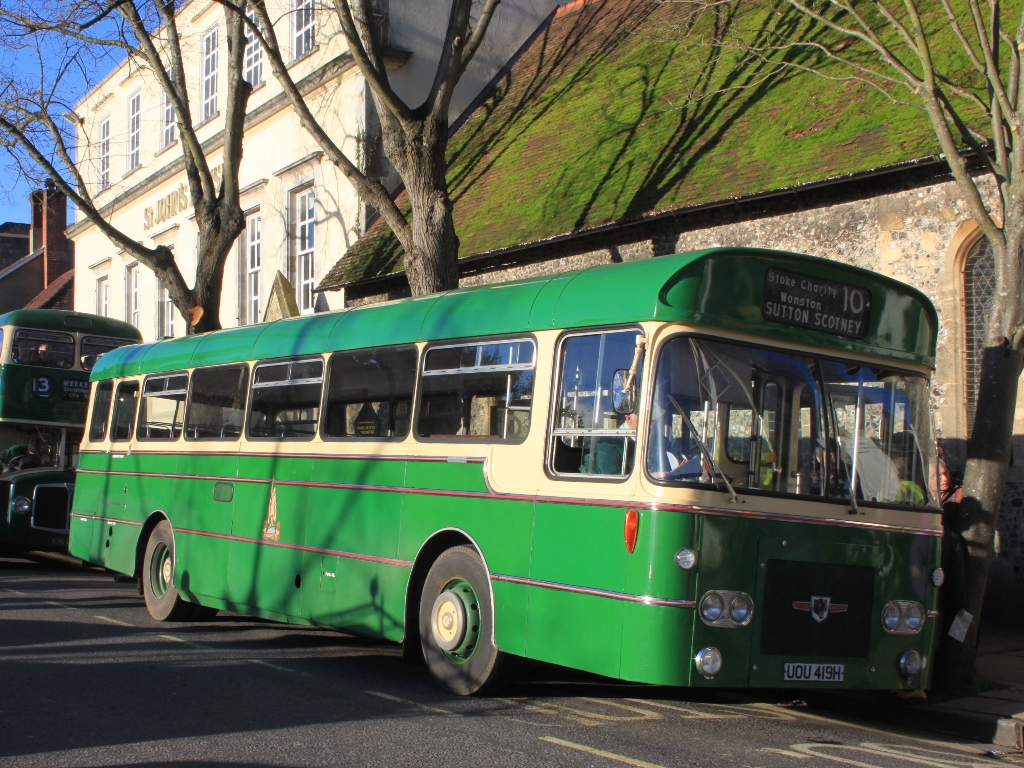
- Preserved Plaxton bodied Leyland Panther in Winchester in January 2013

Overview
- Manufacturer: Leyland
- Production: 1964–1972
- Assembly: Farington, England

Body and chassis
- Doors: 1 or 2
- Floor type: Step entrance
- Chassis: Stepped ladder frame with straight high ladder frame option

Powertrain
- Engine: Leyland 0.600H; Leyland 0.680H
- Capacity: 9.8 litres 11.1 litres
- Power output: 125-200 bhp
- Transmission: Leyland SCG Pneumocyclic with ZF or Voith options

Dimensions
- Length: 11.0 metres
- Width: 2.5 metres
- Height: 3.0 metres
- Curb weight: 16 tonne GVW max

Chronology
- Successor: Leyland National

The Leyland Panther was a rear-engined single-decker bus chassis manufactured by Leyland between the years 1964 and 1972. A version with a smaller engine was released as the Leyland Panther Cub.

== History ==
The Leyland Panther was introduced in 1964. In total, over 600 Panthers were built for operators in the United Kingdom, while about 700 Panther chassis were built for export.

== Operators ==
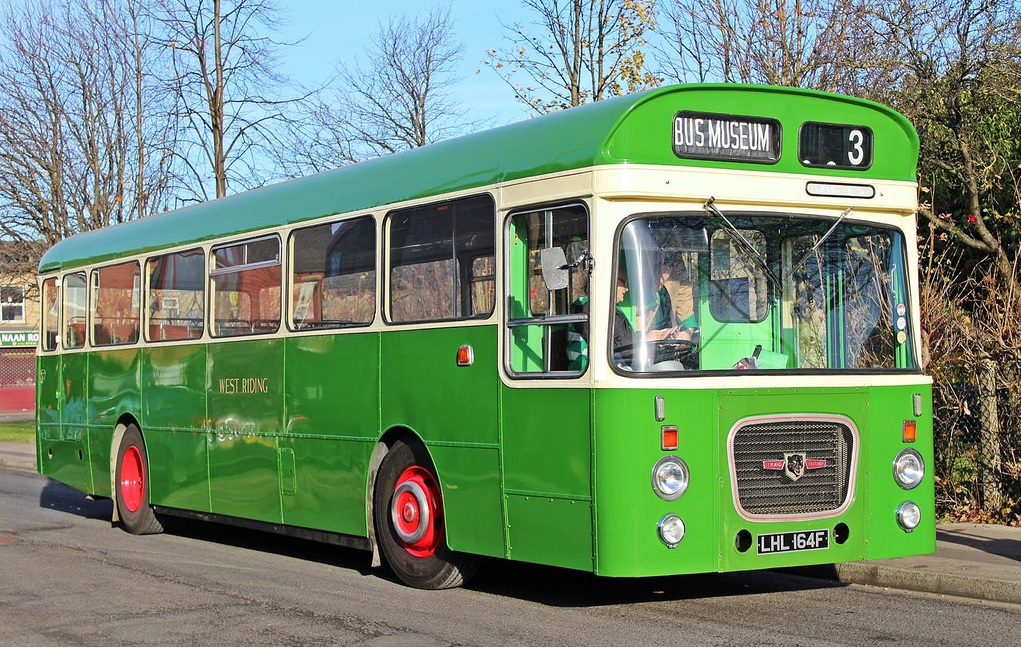
Preserved Roe-bodied West Riding Leyland Panther

=== United Kingdom ===
Sunderland Corporation Transport ordered 30 Panthers in 1965 with Strachans bodies, all of which were delivered by December 1966; by 1971 the fleet was 90 strong. Liverpool City Transport ordered a total of 110 Panthers with Metro Cammell Weymann bodywork while Southport Corporation Transport ordered 22 with Marshall Bus bodywork. Preston Corporation amassed a fleet of 41 Panthers, including a number with Seddon Pennine bodies and the last six Panthers built.

Hull Corporation Transport were an early adopter of the Leyland Panther with Charles H. Roe bodywork, with one Panther being built in 1964 initially for exhibition by the manufacturer at the Commercial Motor Show. The Hull Corporation eventually took delivery of a total twelve Roe-bodied Panthers. East Yorkshire Motor Services also ordered Panthers, ordering 19 with Marshall bodywork in 1965 and 1966, while the West Riding Automobile Company took 45 Leyland Panthers in 1967 with both Marshall and Roe bodywork. One has been preserved at the Dewsbury Bus Museum and is restored to "as delivered" condition.

=== Exports ===
Storstockholms Lokaltrafik in Sweden had 200 left-hand drive Panthers bodied by Park Royal Vehicles.

The largest quantity of Panthers was purchased by Australia's Brisbane City Council, who purchased 341 between 1966 and 1970. The Metropolitan Transport Trust in Perth purchased 127 between 1968 and 1974. A few operators including Forest Coach Lines, Grenda's Bus Service, Melbourne-Brighton Bus Lines and Rover Coaches also purchased Panthers.

Some second-hand Panthers were imported into Australia from Sweden and the United Kingdom in the late 1970s and operated by Fearne's Coaches, Forest Coach Lines, Grenda's Bus Service, Invicta Bus Services and Keiraville Bus Service.

Ten Panthers were sold to Dunedin City Transport in New Zealand, while another ten went to Egged in Israel and were locally bodied by Ha'argaz.
