= Mancunian double-decker bus =

Double-decker bus bodywork built for Manchester Corporation

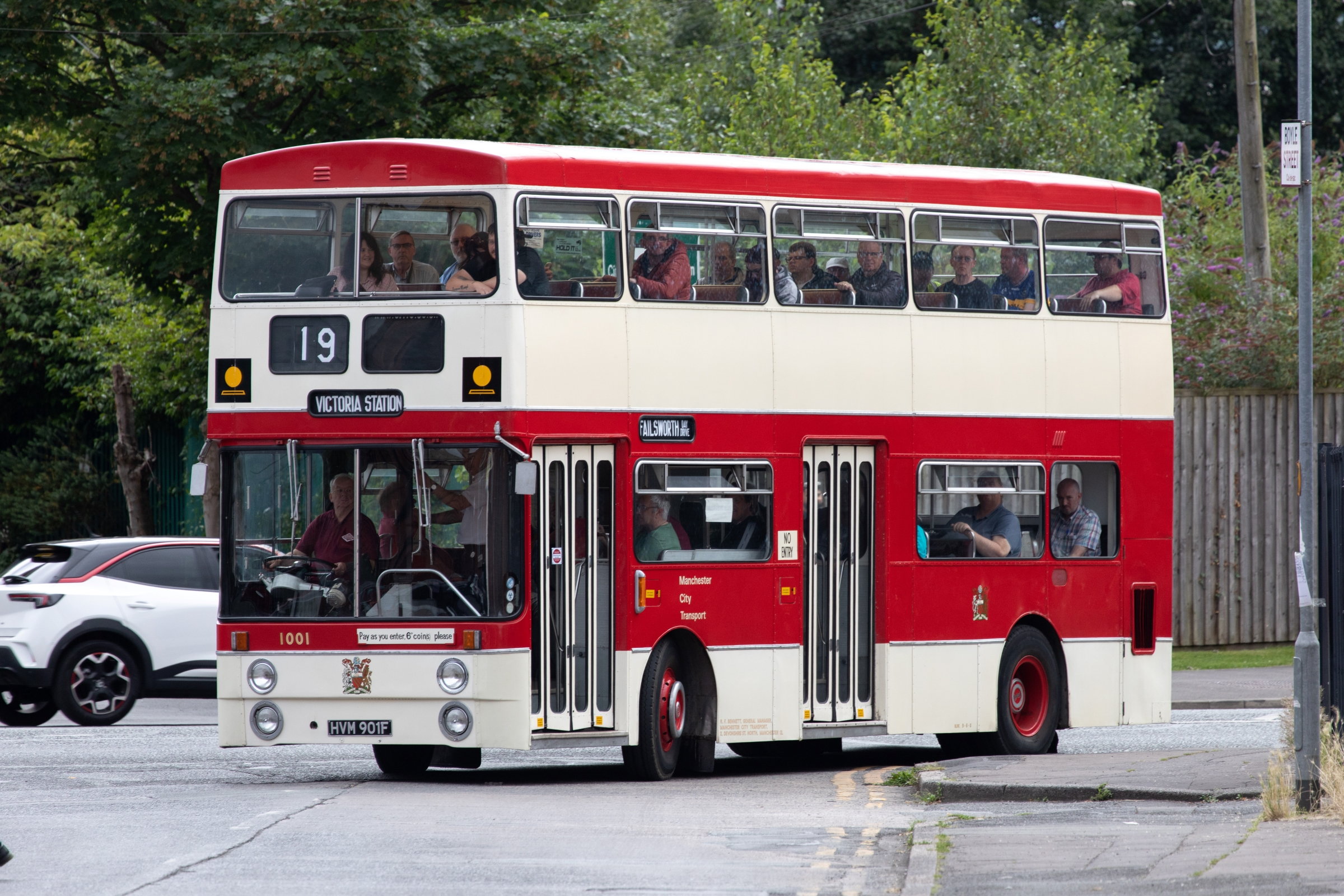
- Preserved Mancunian Leyland Atlantean at the Museum of Transport, Greater Manchester

Overview
- Manufacturer: Park Royal; East Lancs; Metro Cammell; Charles H Roe

Body and chassis
- Doors: 1-2
- Floor type: Step entrance
- Chassis: Daimler Fleetline; Leyland Atlantean

The Mancunian double-decker bus is a type of bodywork for double-decker bus designed by Manchester Corporation Transport Department (MCT) and built on Leyland Atlantean and Daimler Fleetline chassis. A total of 472 Mancunians were ordered by the department between 1965 and 1968 and delivered from 1968 until 1972 with bodywork by Park Royal, East Lancs, Metro Cammell and Charles H Roe. The first 96 buses ordered (48 each from Leyland and Daimler) used a 30-foot (9.1 m) chassis, but the majority were 33 feet (10 m) long. A further 20 were built for Salford City Transport (SCT) but were delivered new to SELNEC PTE.

Nine have been preserved.

Summary of deliveries
Numbers	Quantity	Registrations	Chassis	Body make	Seats	Type code
1001–48	48	HVM 901–948F	Leyland 'Atlantean' PDR1/1	Park Royal	H45/28D	86
1051–97	47	LNA 151–197G	Leyland 'Atlantean' PDR2/1	Park Royal	H47/29D	89
1101–16	16	NNB 510–525H	Leyland 'Atlantean' PDR2/1	Park Royal	H47/28D	89
1117–26	10	NNB 526–535H	Leyland 'Atlantean' PDR2/1	Park Royal	H47/28D	93
1131–42	12	NNB 536–547H	Leyland 'Atlantean' PDR2/1	East Lancs	H47/32F	92
1143–54	12	NNB 548–559H	Leyland 'Atlantean' PDR2/1	East Lancs	H47/26D	89
1161–94	34	ONF 849–882H	Leyland 'Atlantean' PDR2/1	Park Royal	H47/28D	89
1201–20	20	SRJ 324–343H	Leyland 'Atlantean' PDR2/1	Metro-Cammell	H47/31D	99
2001–48	48	HVM 801–848F	Daimler 'Fleetline' CRG6LX	Park Royal	H45/28D	87
2051–92	42	LNA 251–292G	Daimler 'Fleetline' CRG6LX-33	Park Royal	H47/28D	90
2093–97	5	LNA 293–297G	Daimler 'Fleetline' CRG6LXB-33	Park Royal	H47/28D	91
2101–39	39	NNB 560–598H	Daimler 'Fleetline' CRG6LXB-33	Park Royal	H47/28D	91
2140–44	5	NNB 599–603H	Daimler 'Fleetline' CRG6LXB-33	Park Royal	H47/28D	94
2151–2161	11	ONF 883–893H	Daimler 'Fleetline' CRG6LXB-33	Metro-Cammell	H47/30D	98
2162–2210	49	PNA 201–249J	Daimler 'Fleetline' CRG6LXB-33	Metro-Cammell	H47/30D	98
2211–70	60	RNA 211–270J	Daimler 'Fleetline' CRG6LXB-33	Park Royal	H47/29D	98
2271–2304	34	SVR 271–304K	Daimler 'Fleetline' CRG6LXB-33	Roe	H47/29D	98

- Nos. 1201–20 were ordered by SCT; the rest were ordered by MCT.
- Nos. 1001–48/51–97, 1131–42, 2001–48/51–97 were delivered to MCT; the rest were delivered to SELNEC.
- Nos. 2271–2304 were intended to be bodied by East Lancs, but a fire at their works led to the order being transferred to Park Royal, who sub-contracted it to Roe.

The codes for seats denote: H – highbridge-layout double-deck bus (one with central gangways on both decks, as opposed to the lowbridge double-deck bus with a side gangway on the upper deck); this is followed by the number of seats on the upper and lower decks; then either D for dual doors (front entrance, centre exit) or F for front entrance/exit.
