= Leyland Panther Cub =

Rear-engined single-deck bus chassis

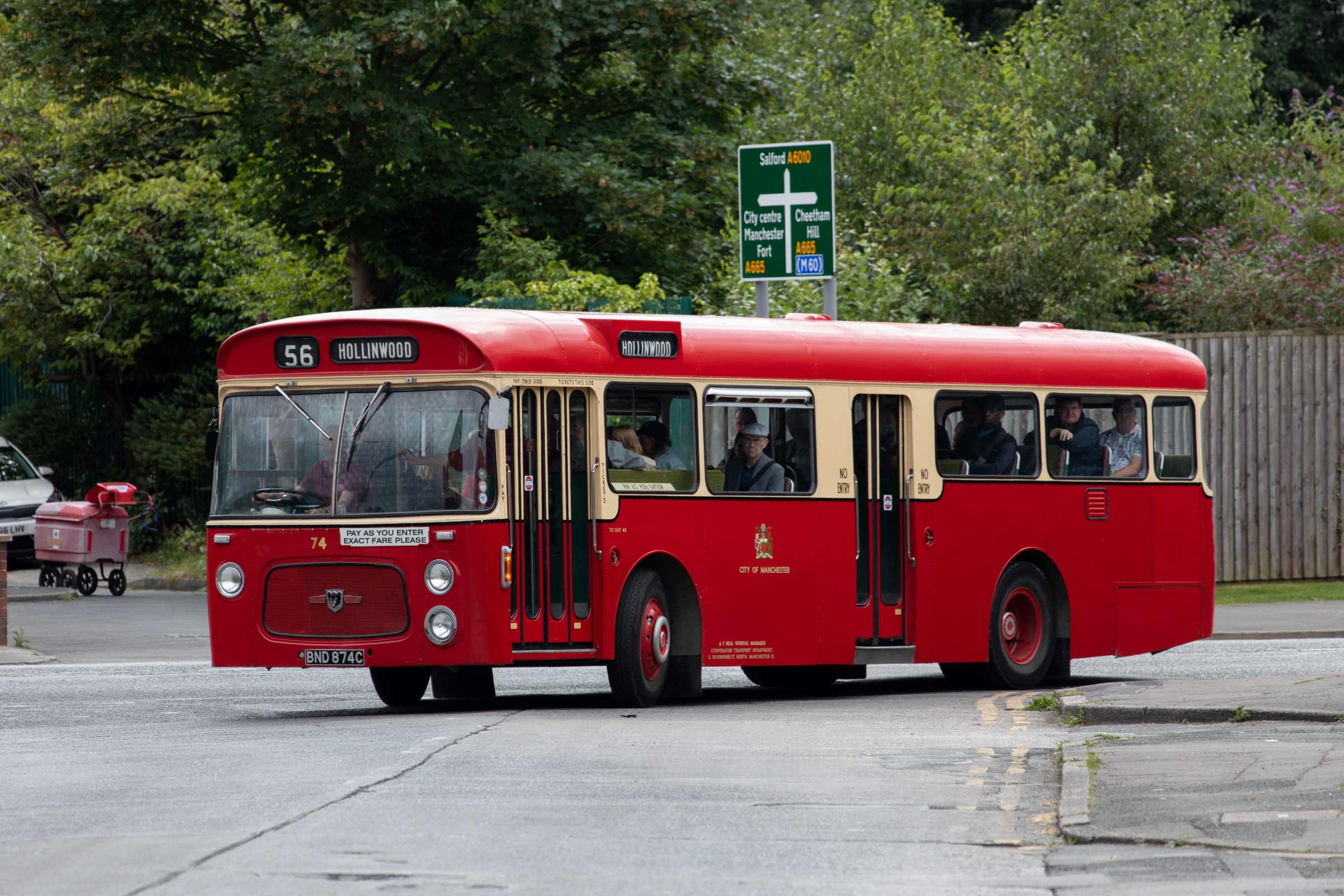
- Preserved Manchester Corporation Park Royal bodied Leyland Panther Cub in July 2024

Overview
- Manufacturer: Leyland
- Production: 1964-1968

Body and chassis
- Doors: 1-2
- Floor type: Step entrance

Powertrain
- Engine: Leyland 0.400H
- Capacity: 43 seated
- Power output: 125 brake horsepower (93 kW)
- Transmission: Leyland/Self-Changing Gears Penumocyclic direct-acting semi-automatic, electric or air control, 4 speeds

Dimensions
- Length: 33 feet (10 m)

The Leyland Panther Cub was a rear-engined single-decker bus manufactured by Leyland between 1964 and 1968. A shorter derivative of the Panther built on request to Manchester Corporation Transport, only 94 buses on this chassis were built for operators in England and Wales.

== Design ==
Directly competing with the Daimler Roadliner, the Leyland Panther Cub was a short-wheelbase derivative of the Panther for 10 metres (33 ft) long by 2.5 metres (8 ft 2 in) wide bodies, the design of the Panther Cub was proposed by Manchester Corporation, who wanted 20 examples of a shorter, 33 feet (10 m) rear-engined single-decker Panther.

The steel-channel ladder frame (upswept to the rear) was similar to the Panther but about 2 feet (0.61 m) shorter, with a wheelbase of 16.6 feet (5.1 m) rather than the Panther's standard 18.6 feet (5.7 m) or optional 17.6 feet (5.4 m). Standard Panther components used on the Panther Cub included the front-mounted radiator, front steel-leaf springs, cab controls and braking and electrical systems.

Due to statutory construction and use rules on maximum rear-overhang length, however, Leyland considered that the 0.600H engine of the Panther would not be a feasible fit in a shorter version. The 0.400H, alongside running units from the Leyland Tiger Cub such as the pneumocyclic gearbox, brakes, axles and rear steel-leaf springs, were used instead. As a result of these length, structural and mechanical changes, the Panther Cub weighed almost a tonne less than the full-size Panther.

== Operators ==
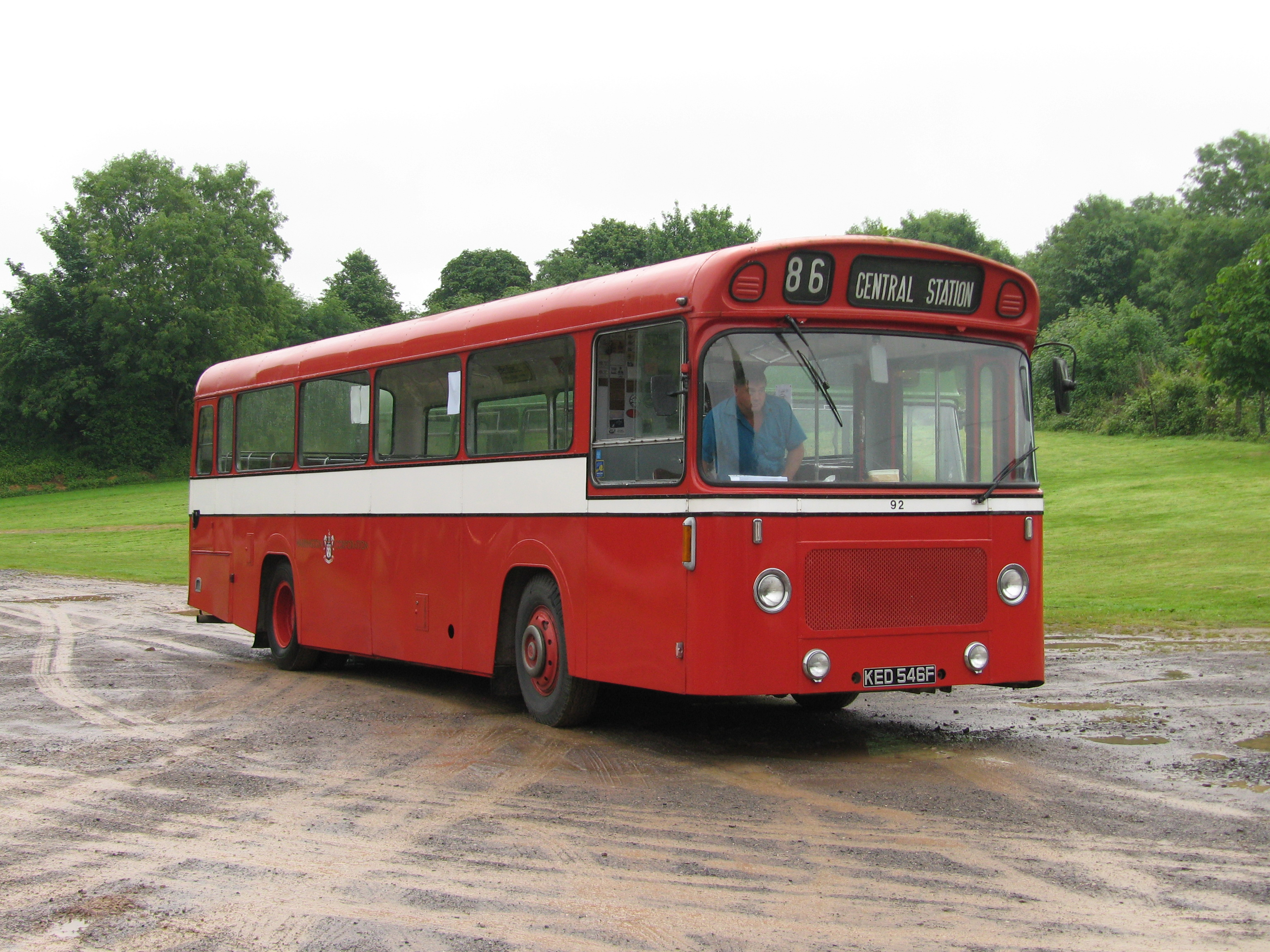
Preserved Warrington Corporation East Lancashire Coachbuilders bodied Leyland Panther Cub in June 2008

A total of 94 Panther Cubs were built, 78 of which were for municipal bus operators. The first Panther Cub, built with a Park Royal body and destined for Manchester Corporation, was shown at the 1964 Commercial Motor Show at the Earls Court Exhibition Centre. The remainder of the order for 20 Park Royal-bodied Panther Cubs were delivered to Manchester Corporation during 1965, ten of which were equipped with superchargers; thirty full-length Panthers were later delivered in 1967.

Portsmouth Corporation Transport were the largest purchaser of the Panther Cub, taking 26 fitted with Marshall dual-door bodies throughout 1967. Among deliveries to municipals included seven Marshall-bodied Panther Cubs to Brighton Corporation, four Marshall-bodied Panther Cubs to Oldham Corporation in 1967, four East Lancashire-bodied Panther Cubs to Warrington Corporation in 1967, three Marshall-bodied Cubs to Sunderland Corporation in 1965, and two East Lancashire bodied Panther Cubs to Ashton-under-Lyne Corporation in 1967, the latter of which were built to single-door configuration.

A total of 19 Panther Cubs were also sold to operators within the British Electric Traction group, with East Yorkshire Motor Services taking 16, and Thomas Brothers of Port Talbot taking three.

=== Exports ===
Some Panther Cubs saw further service after being exported to Australia. Operators of these exported Panther Cubs included Calabro Brothers of Bonyrigg, Grenda's Bus Service, Horrell of Wollongong, Johnson's Motor Service of Edgeworth, Keiraville Bus Service, of Fairy Meadow and Toronto Bus Service.

== Problems in operation ==
These were manifold and difficult for operators to resolve. The Panther Cub was a relatively underpowered chassis asked to do a job beyond its capabilities. Ten of the twenty Manchester examples had turbo-charged engines, the turbocharger fitment designed to give more torque at lower revolutions rather than more horsepower, but the turbocharged engines had more than their share of blown cylinder-head gaskets and was removed to improve reliability, so although the option was offered throughout the Panther Cub's short life, few but the Manchester buses had this version of the 0.400H engine.

East Yorkshire seemed to have least troubles with the type and Manchester found it most troublesome. An engineer with Manchester Corporation during the time they were operated has said that the reluctance of maintenance staff to treat the new buses as different from the older front-engined double-deckers then forming the majority of the Manchester fleet was as much to blame as perceived design weaknesses. This view is supported by their later longevity with smaller operators in the UK and overseas more inclined to adapt and manage difficulties flexibly to overcome them. Yorkshire's East Riding is a generally flat littoral and their Panther Cubs replaced Tiger Cubs that were not very taxed by their duties. The Manchester buses were asked to do the job of 56-seat double-deckers on busy urban routes.

=== Causes of poor sales ===
The pace of change was faster in the 1960s than it had been in the previous decade, and the Panther Cub was overtaken by events. The most important of which was a share-exchange in January 1965 between the Department of Transport and Leyland Motor Corporation, this resulted in the Transport Holding Company owning 30% shares in Park Royal Vehicles and Charles H Roe, and Leyland Motor Corporation owning 25% of Bristol Commercial Vehicles and Eastern Coach Works, this removed Bristol chassis and ECW bodies from the sales restrictions that had applied from 1948.

The Bristol RE was available in 10m or 11m form and even in the shorter version, large high-output Leyland and Gardner engines could be fitted. Many customers bought the shorter RESL version and 698 of these were sold between 1966 and 1975. The only 10m long rear-engined single decker chassis to sell better than the RESL in the UK, because of large London Transport orders, was the short-wheelbase AEC Swift, which shared the same frame as the Panther Cub.

Nobody wanted a Panther Cub coach. The closest alternative in the Leyland Motor Corporation catalogue was the Park Royal-bodied Albion Viking but that only sold six of a planned sixteen. The Panther Cub chassis frame was given AEC units and built in Southall as the short-wheelbase AEC Swift and sold well from 1966 to 1975.
