= Daimler Fleetline =

British rear-engined double-decker bus chassis

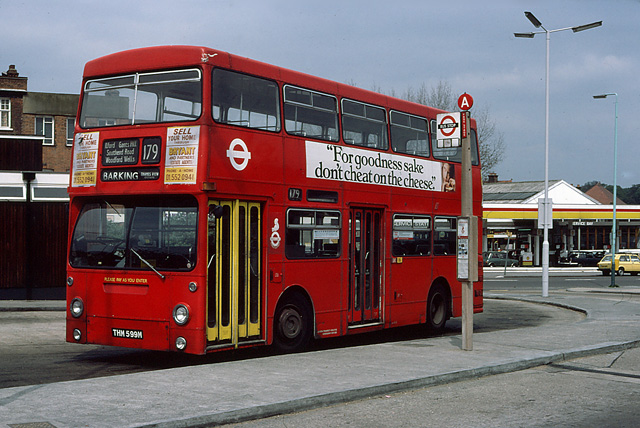
- London Transport MCW-bodied Daimler Fleetline in Chingford in April 1980

Overview
- Manufacturer: Daimler; Leyland
- Production: 1960–1975 (Daimler); 1975–1983 (Leyland)

Body and chassis
- Doors: 1 or 2
- Floor type: Step entrance

Powertrain
- Engine: Daimler CD6 (prototypes only); Gardner 6LW (8.4L, 112bhp at 1700rpm); Gardner 6LX (10.45L, 150bhp at 1700rpm); Gardner 6LXB (10.45L, 180bhp at 1850rpm); Leyland 0.680; Leyland 0.690; Cummins V6 200
- Capacity: 8.4 litres - 11.3 litres
- Power output: 112 - 188 bhp
- Transmission: Daimatic; Self-Changing Gears

Dimensions
- Length: 30 feet (9.1 m); 33 feet (10 m); 36 feet (11 m)

Chronology
- Successor: Leyland Olympian

The Daimler Fleetline (known as the Leyland Fleetline from circa 1975) is a rear-engined double-decker bus chassis which was built between 1960 and 1983.

It was the second of three bus models to have a marque name as well as an alphanumeric identity code. The other two were the Freeline and the Roadliner.

== Design ==
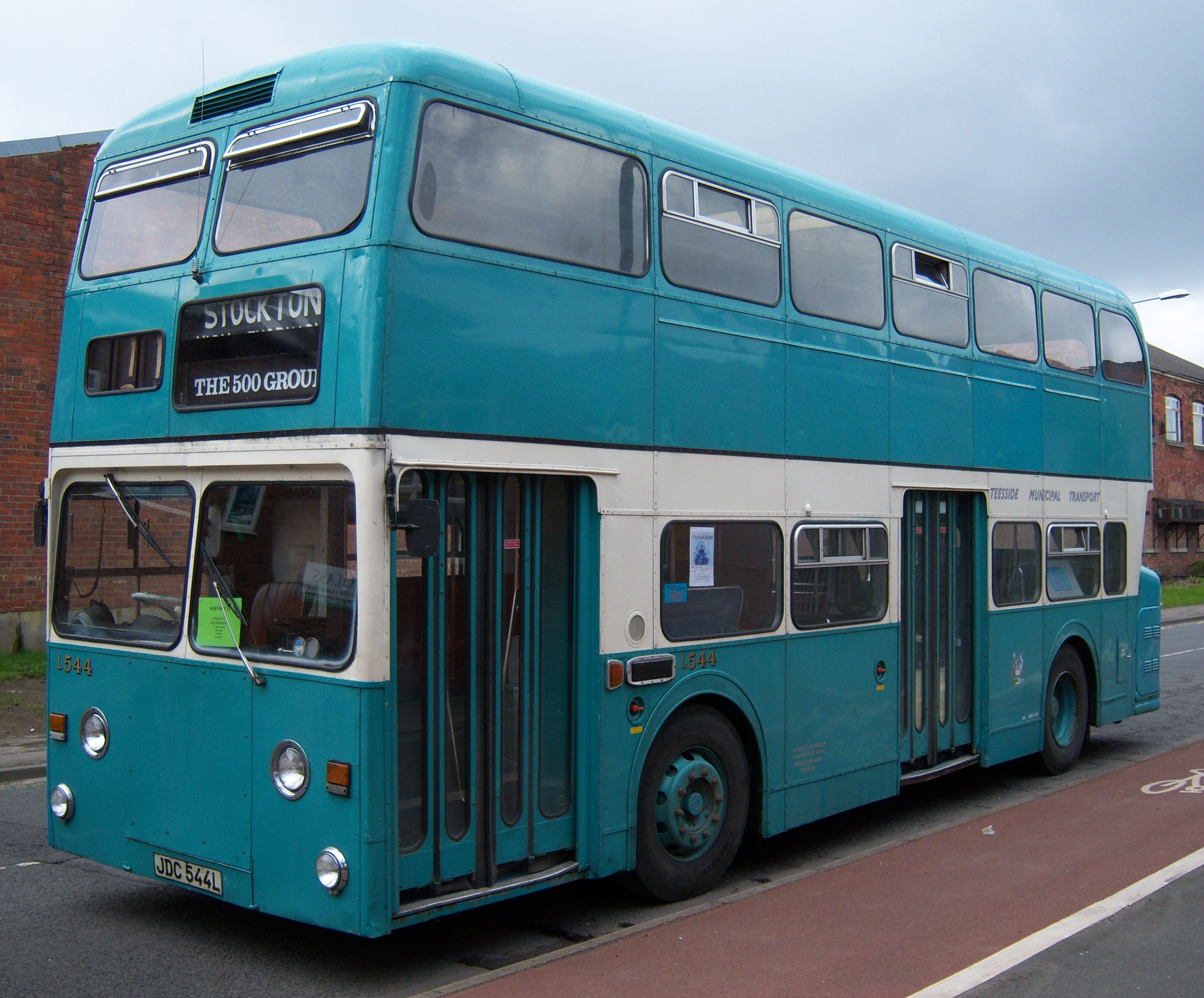
Preserved Teesside Municipal Transport Northern Counties bodied Daimler Fleetline in April 2012

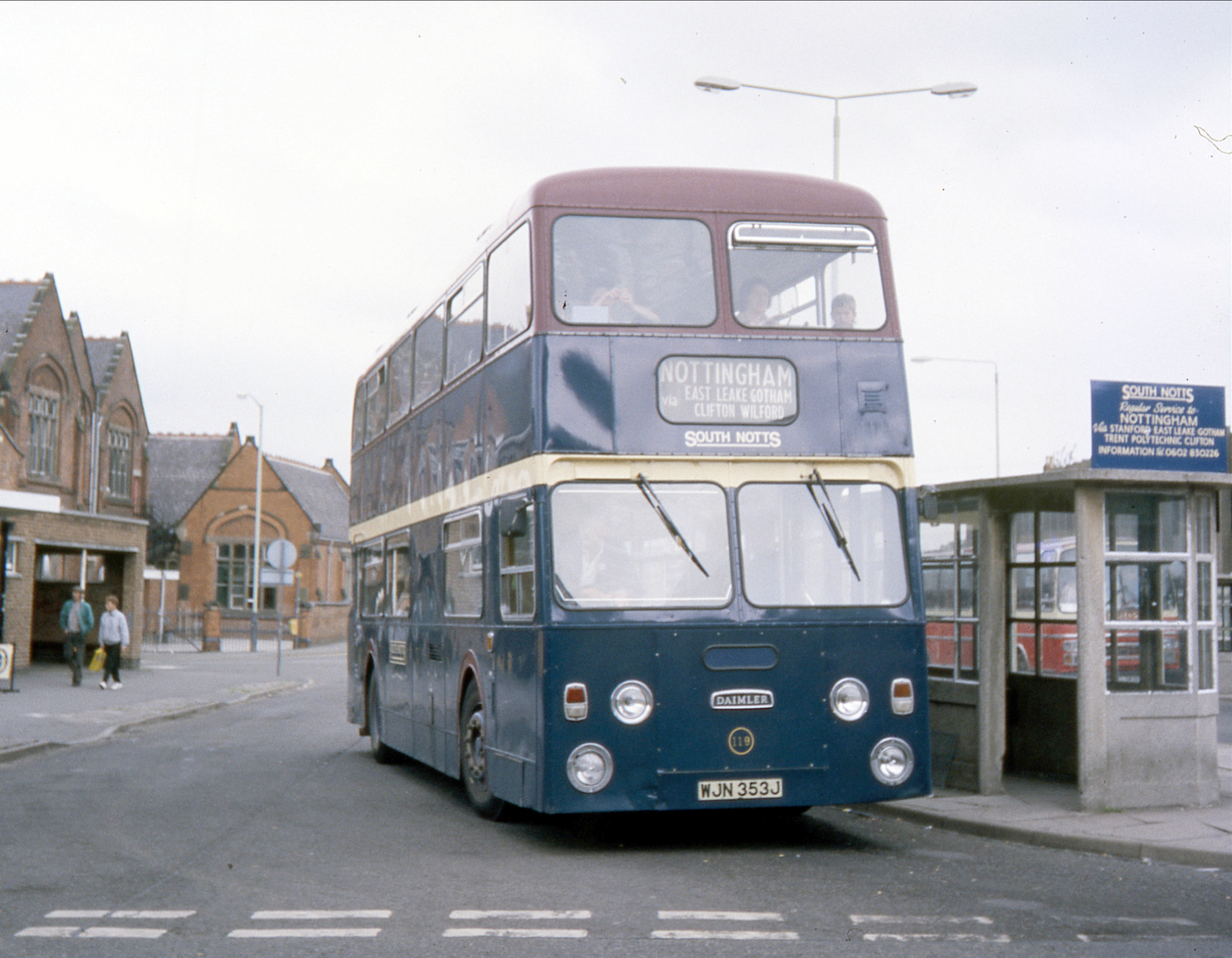
South Notts Northern Counties bodied Daimler Fleetline in Loughborough in 1989

The Daimler Fleetline was the second rear-engined double-decker bus chassis to be launched by a UK manufacturer, following Leyland's introduction of the Atlantean in 1958. From the outset, the Fleetline had a drop-centre rear axle fitted as standard, enabling low-height bodywork to be fitted without necessitating an inconvenient seating layout in part of the upper deck, as was the case with early Atlanteans. Leyland responded by offering a drop-centre rear axle as an option on the Atlantean, but after the two companies came under the same ownership in 1968, the low-height Atlantean option was discontinued.

The prototype Fleetline was fitted with a Daimler engine, but when production started only Gardner 6LX or 6LW engines were offered. By 1968 Gardner's new and more powerful 6LXB was also an option, and in 1970 Leyland's O.680 engine became available. Gardner engines had an excellent reputation for reliability and economy while Leyland engines were more lively and had greater fuel consumption. Most Fleetline customers preferred Gardner engines, but the Leyland engine became popular - particularly for a period in the 1970s when Gardner were unable to meet demand.

In late 1960s, Daimler developed the longer 36 feet double-deck Fleetline. This chassis had a longitudinally-mounted Cummins V6 engine, same as the single-deck Roadliner, at the rear offside corner. It was designed mainly for export, but one was built for Walsall Corporation Transport.

In mid-1970s, Leyland developed a special version of the Fleetline, known as the B20, with Leyland O.690 engine, air cowls on both sides above the engine compartment and reduced noise levels. All of these went to London Transport.

The first prototype Fleetline was unveiled in December 1960. Between 1960 and 1973, the Fleetline was manufactured in Coventry, with production then transferred to Farington.

=== Designations ===
Daimler Fleetline chassis designations started with the letters CR, of which the C is variously reported to stand for Coventry or Commercial, and the R stands for Rear-engined. For single-deckers this became SR (although not on the earliest examples which were referred to with the standard CR).

This was followed by a code to indicate the engine fitted: D6 (Daimler 6-cylinder, prototypes only); G6 (Gardner 6-cylinder, more often than not this was expanded to the more specific G6LW, G6LX or G6LXB); L6 (Leyland 6-cylinder); C6 (Cummins 6-cylinder).

The standard length of the Fleetline was 30 feet but lengths of 33' feet and 36' feet were also available, which were sometimes (though not consistently) identified by a suffix of -33 or -36 (sometimes with an oblique stroke in place of the hyphen).

Later Leyland Fleetline chassis designations were different: FE for Fleetline, followed by 30 or 33 (length in feet); A for Air brakes; G for Gardner or L for Leyland engine; R for Right-hand drive.

== United Kingdom ==
=== London ===
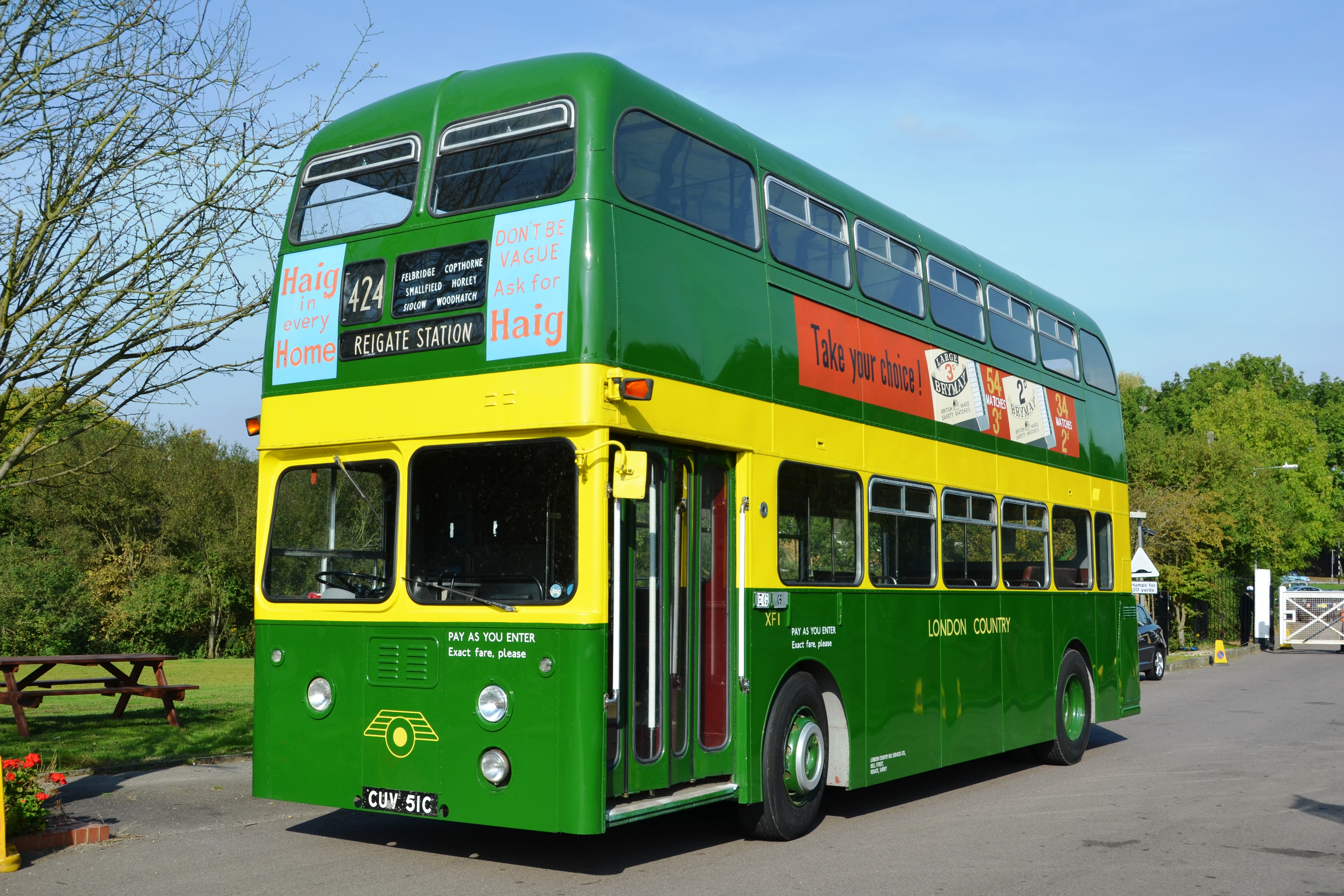
A preserved London Country Park Royal-bodied XF Fleetline in 2014

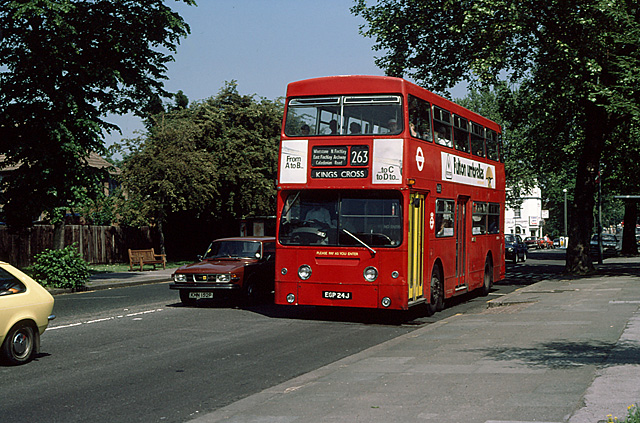
An early Park Royal-bodied DMS Fleetline in North Finchley in 1982

London Transport was the largest British Fleetline operator, purchasing 2,646 between 1970 and 1978, the last 400 being built as B20s, in addition to the earlier XF (eXperimental Fleetline) class of eight buses delivered to London Country for evaluation against the Leyland Atlantean in 1965. London Transport's Fleetlines were fitted with either Park Royal or MCW bodywork. They were classed as DMS (either Daimler Mono-Standee or Daimler Multi-Standee) under London Transport's fleet code system, though upon delivery of the first DMS Fleetlines in December 1970, the type was initially advertised by London Transport as 'The Londoner Bus' to avoid confusion with the Fleet Line of the London Underground, which was under construction at the time.

The first vehicles entered service on 2 January 1971 on routes 95 and 220 from Brixton and Shepherds Bush garages. The first batch of London Fleetlines had Gardner engines, but Leyland engined the majority. Nearly 200 B20 Fleetlines were fitted with Iveco engines during the 1980s.

The Fleetlines proved unpopular in London, mainly because boarding was much slower than with the open-platform AEC Routemasters. To counter this, London Transport trialled the AFC (Automated Fare Collection) turnstile entry system on some of the fleet. This was coin-operated and was intended as a quicker, second boarding option as an alternative to paying the driver. However, the AFC system proved unpopular due to unreliability, and on 27 May 1979, by which the system was generating 4% revenue, the trial was abandoned and the equipment began to be removed. Maintenance was another major issue, as the parts became defective much sooner. Maintenance costs for rear-engined, front entrance buses were much higher than the older half-cab models due to the inability to separate the body from chassis for modular overhaul. This was also exacerbated by there being a 50% government grant for new vehicles at the time, rendering withdrawal a cost-effective option at or around the time of their first (seven-year) recertification for service.

Withdrawals of the Fleetlines commenced in February 1979, with Leyland Titans and MCW Metrobuses purchased as replacements. Many of the withdrawn Fleetlines were either sent to dealer Ensignbus of Purfleet, or were disposed of to the Wombwell Diesels scrapyard in South Yorkshire, with some Fleetlines being scrapped before reaching ten years of service. However, hundreds of ex-London Fleetlines proved popular second-hand purchases for operators throughout Britain from 1979 and during the 1980s, including the aftermath of deregulation. In some cases, the special modifications which had been built into the buses to meet London Transport's own specifications were removed at the request of the purchaser, to improve reliability and restore standardisation with other Fleetlines in their fleets. A number were also sold for export, with many former London Fleetlines being purchased and refurbished for further service in Hong Kong throughout the 1980s. Nearly 50 vehicles found operations in the United States for double-deck open-top sightseeing work.

=== Outside London ===
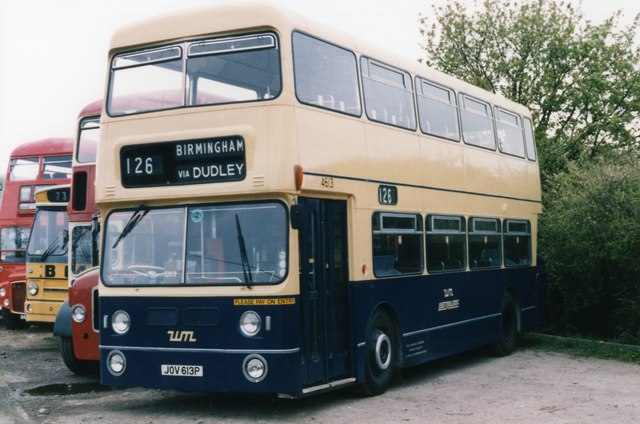
Preserved West Midlands Passenger Transport Executive Park Royal bodied Leyland Fleetline in 1992

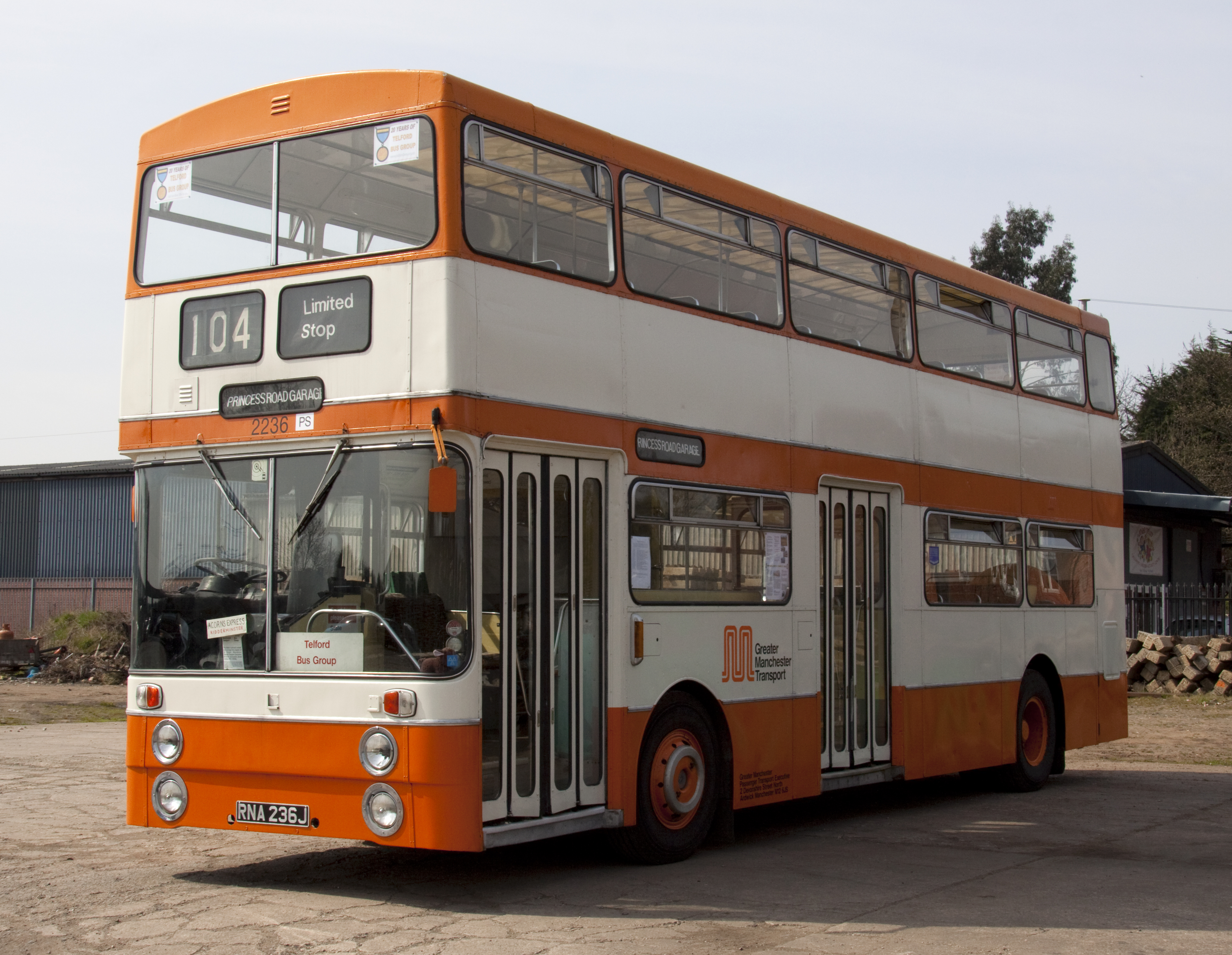
Preserved Greater Manchester Transport Park Royal 'Mancunian'-bodied Daimler Fleetline in 2010

Second in fleet size was Birmingham City Transport and its successor West Midlands Passenger Transport Executive with well over 1,000 Fleetlines, primarily bodied by Park Royal and MCW, including the first single-decker Fleetlines in 1965. Other constituent municipal fleets absorbed by West Midlands PTE, including Midland Red, as well as the purchase of 80 surplus London Transport Fleetlines, all contributed to the PTE's Fleetline fleet to boost the number to over 2,100. Upon deregulation in 1986, this had been reduced to a total of 914 Fleetlines inherited by West Midlands PTE's successor West Midlands Travel; these Fleetlines were progressively replaced by modern vehicles throughout the 1980s and 1990s until the last Fleetline was withdrawn in November 1997, ending 37 years of Daimler Fleetline operations in the West Midlands.

The Greater Manchester Passenger Transport Executive and its predecessors was another significant operator of Fleetlines outside London, ordering over 500 of the type despite mainly standardising on the Leyland Atlantean. In 1968, 48 Fleetlines with Park Royal 'Mancunian' bodywork entered service with Manchester Corporation Transport, following on from the delivery of 48 Leyland Atlanteans with similar bodywork a year prior. These were the first double-deck buses designed to take advantage of new legislation allowing for one-person operation of buses in the United Kingdom, with 472 33 feet (10 m) examples subsequently being built on both Fleetline and Leyland Atlantean chassis, most later examples being delivered in the orange and white livery of the SELNEC Passenger Transport Executive. SELNEC PTE would inherit 314 Fleetlines upon its creation in 1969; all Fleetlines subsequently purchased by the PTE, as well as by its Lancashire United Transport subsidiary, would be delivered with 'Standard' bodywork assembled by Northern Counties.

The South Yorkshire Passenger Transport Executive (SYPTE) operated a significant number of Fleetlines bodied by a number of operators during the 1970s, many of which were inherited from the PTE's predecessors. Prior to the PTE's creation, 85 Fleetlines were ordered by Sheffield Corporation Transport in 1971 for delivery beginning in 1974, however after lengthy delays related to the 1973 oil crisis and the moving of the Fleetline's production facilities, these were eventually delivered to South Yorkshire PTE between 1977 and 1978, with these Fleetlines suffering from a number of mechanical defects shortly after delivery. The PTE also took delivery of 29 MCW-bodied Fleetlines built near-identical to London Transport specification in 1974.

Other English PTEs, plus many municipal bus companies such as Cardiff Bus, with 90 examples, BET Group, Scottish Bus Group and independent sectors purchased Fleetlines.

=== Unusual Fleetlines ===
Walsall Corporation specified some non-standard short-wheelbase Fleetlines, the first of which, 1 UDH , was only 25 ft 7 in long, had no front overhang and had its entrance behind the front axle. The next 29 vehicles were 27 ft 6 in long with a short front overhang and again only an entrance behind the front axle. The remaining 69 were 28 ft 6 in long, with a narrow entrance in the usual position along with the entrance behind the front axle. 1 UDH had Northern Counties bodywork with wrap-around windscreens on both decks, similar to that specified by Barton Transport on AEC Regents and a Dennis Loline.

Several operators purchased single-deck Fleetlines (Birmingham was the first, in 1965). Rotherham Corporation purchased two 33' single deck fleetlines with 45 seat Willowbrook dual purpose bodies. Mexborough and Swinton Traction Company ordered three similar vehicles with Marshall bodywork for White Rose Express services. However they were delivered to Yorkshire Traction following the takeover in October 1969. In late 1970, Yorkshire Traction purchased nine 36' Fleetlines with dual door Walter Alexander W type bodywork.

Unusual engines temporarily fitted by operators in Fleetlines in the 1960s included a Perkins V8 installed in a Walsall Fleetline, and a BMMO 10.5 litre unit in a Midland Red unit. Most remarkably, in 1972 a Rolls-Royce LPG engine was fitted to a Teesside Municipal Transport Fleetline.

As part of a pilot scheme to create a small fleet of midibuses, WMPTE converted double deck Leyland Fleetline 6956 (WDA 956T) into a single deck vehicle. Renumbered 1956 to fit in with the single-decker fleet number sequence, the bus passed to successor West Midlands Travel and is preserved at Wythall Transport Museum.

== Hong Kong ==
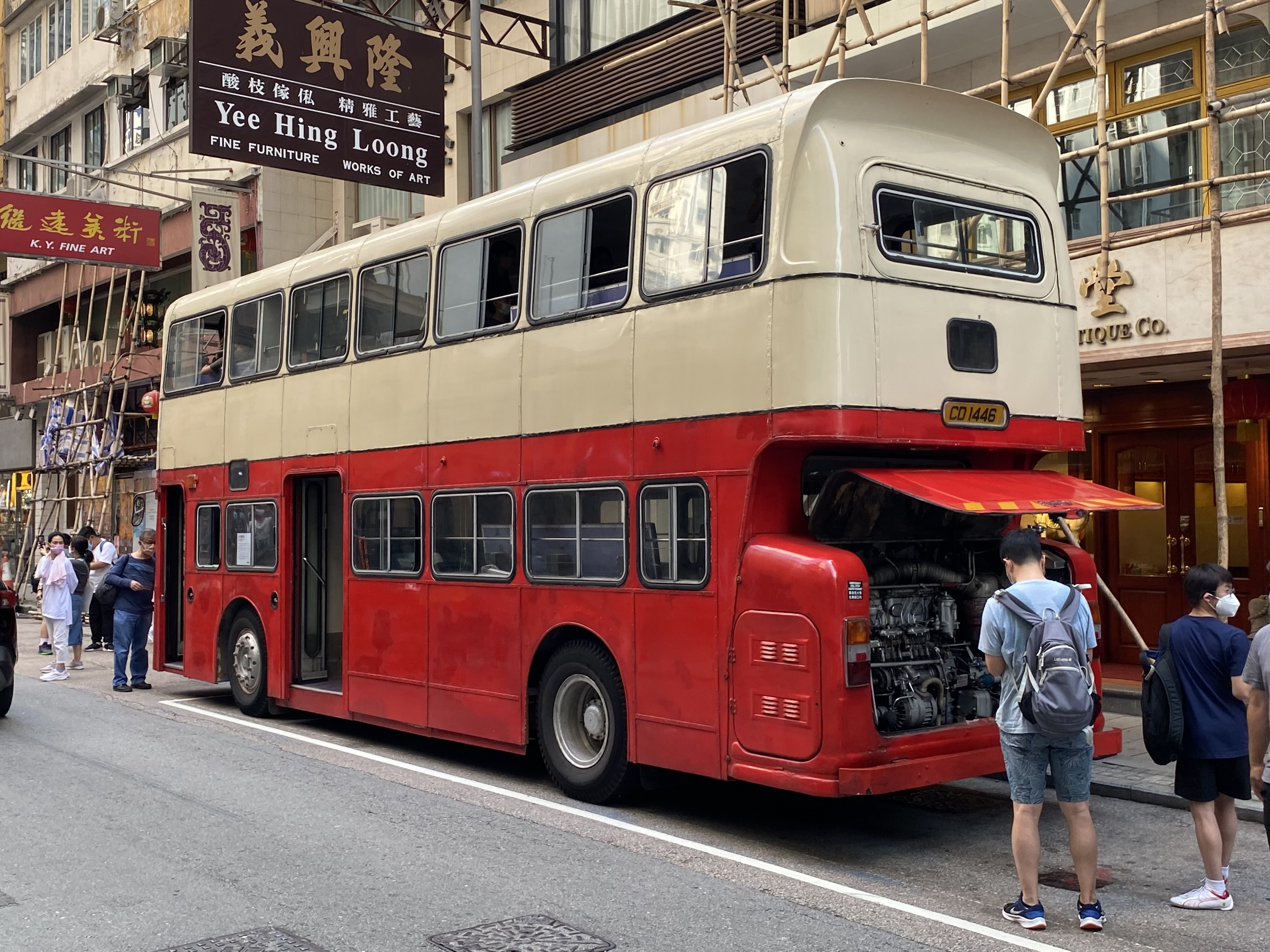
China Motor Bus Leyland Fleetline, showing the unusual rear elevation designed around the upwards opening engine cover

China Motor Bus purchased 336 Fleetlines between 1972 and 1980, followed in the 1980s both CMB by 207 second-hand former London Transport Fleetlines. Kowloon Motor Bus purchased 450 between 1974 and 1979. These were mainly deployed to Cross-Harbour Tunnel routes. On the basis of their large capacity, these were nicknamed Jumbos after the Boeing 747.

Citybus and Argos Bus, operators of non-franchised routes and private hire services in Hong Kong, also purchased secondhand Fleetlines. Many Hong Kong Fleetlines were sold to China for further service after being withdrawn in 1980s/1990s.

== Preservation ==
A few Fleetlines have been preserved. The London Transport Museum has London Transport's DMS 1 kept in Acton Depot, while the Ensign Bus Museum has numerically the last, DM 2646, preserved in the Shillibeer livery that it carried during 1979. Other vehicles preserved include DMS 115, 132, 550, 999, 1002, 1051, 1052, 1601, 1868, 2216, 2375, 2394 & the special Ogle-designed 2456.
