= Daimler Roadliner =

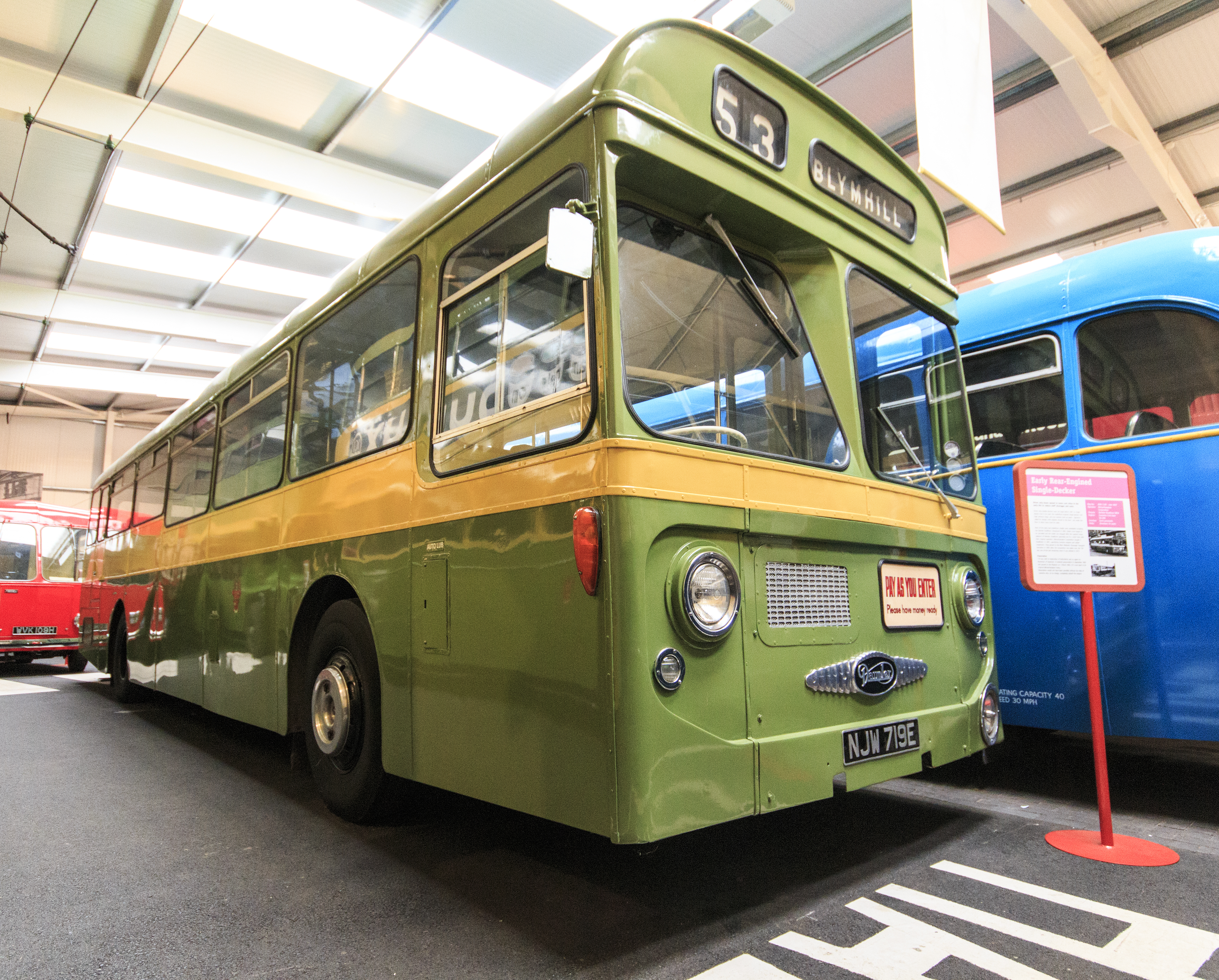
- Preserved Wolverhampton Corporation 1967 Daimler Roadliner at The Transport Museum, Wythall in September 2014

Overview
- Manufacturer: Daimler; British Leyland
- Production: 1965 - 1972
- Assembly: Coventry, England

Body and chassis
- Doors: 1-2
- Floor type: Bus: Low floor Coach: Step entrance

Powertrain
- Engine: Daimler (prototypes only); Cummins V6; Perkins V8; AEC V8-810
- Transmission: Daimatic/Self-Changing Gears 4-speed epicyclic Allison Transmission MT41 torque converter

Dimensions
- Length: 36 feet

Chronology
- Predecessor: Daimler Freeline

The Daimler Roadliner was a single-decker bus and coach chassis built by Daimler between 1962 and 1972. Notoriously unreliable, it topped the 1993 poll by readers of Classic Bus as the worst bus type ever, beating the Guy Wulfrunian into second place. It was very technologically advanced, offering step-free access some 20 years before other buses; as a coach, it was felt by industry commentators to be in advance of contemporary UK designs.

== Background and prototypes ==
In 1960, Transport Vehicles (Daimler) Ltd, the commercial vehicle subsidiary of Daimler Company, launched its Fleetline double-decker at the Earls Court Commercial Motor show, this was the second British type of rear-engined double decker. Its major advantage over the Leyland Atlantean was that its patented concentric-drive gearbox enabled fitment as standard of a dropped-centre rear axle, allowing a body suitable for low bridges of 13 ft 5 in (4.09 m) high to have a centre-gangway seating plan for the full length of both decks. In comparison, the low-height Atlantean needed an awkward side-gangway abaft upstairs to allow legal internal headroom throughout.

The standard power unit for the Fleetline was the 150 bhp Gardner 6LX, which was the most economical diesel engine in its class, and regarded by many engineers as even more reliable than the Leyland O.600. By the end of 1962, 125 Fleetlines had been delivered and over 300 were on order. This pleased Daimler's new owner Jaguar Cars and Jaguar's MD Sir William Lyons allowed work to start in mid-1962 on a new single-decker chassis to replace the underfloor-engined Daimler Freeline.

Two were constructed to the newly allowed maximum dimensions of 36 ft (11 m) long and 8 ft 2 1/2 in (2.50 m) wide; they featured an identical drive layout to the Fleetline and shared with it a transverse rear-engine location. However, the power unit for these prototypes was a horizontal Daimler CD6 engine fitted with a turbocharger and arranged in the rear nearside corner of the chassis so that all ancillaries could be accessed from the engine's upper face. The radiator was mounted at the front and the chassis had conventional steel leaf springs. One was shown on the Daimler stand at the 1962 Commercial Motor Show, and a brochure was produced for the type, although production was not an immediate prospect, as the Daimler engine had ceased production. Customer interest in a modern Daimler single-decker bus was, however, strong enough for Lyons to give the go-ahead for a production bus of this type.

Instead of the complex transverse horizontal drive, the company decided to use a vertical longitudinal rear-engined layout. Instead of the very low horizontal frame of the first two chassis, this was slightly higher at the front and ramped gently upward and tapered outward toward the rear, where the Cummins VIM V6-200 engine was mounted. This 9.6-litre 90-degree V6 engine developed 192 bhp at 2600 rpm and was compact enough to fit under the rear seat on a bodied bus and allow drive to pass through a conventional Daimler SCG Daimatic four-speed semiautomatic gearbox to a straight spiral-bevel rear axle manufactured by Eaton, an electrically operated two-speed axle being optional. All-round air suspension was standard, with rubber and steel leaf options. Although some drawings show a front-mounted radiator, standard production versions had this mounted on the rear offside, as on the Fleetline. Other components such as the front axle, steering, brakes, driving controls, etc. were similar to those of the Fleetline. The model was announced as the Roadliner model SRC6-36, this was the third and last Daimler bus chassis to be given a model name, as well as an alphanumeric code.

A left-hand drive chassis and Duple Coachbuilders 51 seat coach demonstrator were shown at the 1964 show together with the first example sold to an operator, 6000EH of Potteries Motor Traction (PMT). The PMT bus had a 50-seat Marshall body to British Electric Traction style, featuring no steps and a slightly ramped floor up to the rear bench. The floor level was so low side-facing bench seats had to be fitted over both sets of wheelarches, a contemporary reviewer remarked the footstools to the front benches as rather high. This bus entered service in late 1964 and unprecedentedly the union branch operating it were so impressed, they sent a letter of congratulation to Daimler. The coach and a further Marshall bus started work from early 1965 as Daimler demonstrators, the coach in particular garnering a great deal of praise on its road tests.

== Production ==
To begin with, it was intended to build the Cummins V6 in the UK in a joint-venture Jaguar-Cummins operation at the former Henry Meadows factory adjacent to Guy Motors in Wolverhampton, but this was not accomplished, and all the Cummins V6-200 engines for the UK were imported from Cummins' factory in Columbus, Indiana, United States. As well as powering the majority of Roadliners, the engine was the launch power unit for the Guy Big J lorry (Guy had been a Jaguar subsidiary since 1961) and was also fitted into Atkinson lorries, customers including Pickfords and the UK Ministry of Transport.

The first production Roadliners began to enter service during 1966. Early UK Roadliner customers were corporations in Wolverhampton and Sunderland, independents West Riding Automobile Company, Wakefield, and AA Motors, Ayr. PMT's first production batch arrived in 1966/67. By the end of production in 1972, 333 Roadliners had been built; besides the UK, examples had gone to Australia, Belgium, Canada, Poland, South Africa, Spain, and Switzerland. Plaxton bodied the most vehicles overall and the largest export territory was South Africa, which took the last examples built. The Municipal Tramways Trust in Adelaide purchased 35.

== Technical problems ==
=== Engine ===
The Cummins V6 had that manufacturer's patented intermediate-pressure fuel pump and governor system, supplying the fuel to open-cup injectors through internal drilled fuel galleries, four-valve cylinder heads and tappet-actuated injection. This made the engine less than suitable for slow-speed, stop-start work, even at the derated bus setting of 150 bhp at 2100 rpm. It was also a noisy unit in operation, said to sound like a contemporary Formula One racing car. Especially on the bus, work problems developed with damaged tappets, burnt valves, damaged valves, damaged pistons, damaged blocks, clogged injectors, cylinder-block failures, smoke emissions, and excessive wear, as well as roughness and noise in operation, a tendency to refuse to restart when hot, refusal to start in general, and endemic overheating, sometimes resulting in radiator caps being blown off and steam and scalding water jetting out behind the bus. Bournemouth Corporation had 17 engine replacements over 11 buses during the warranty period and PMT (the largest customer with 58 buses and six coaches) had two Cummins engineers permanently resident in Stoke-on-Trent assisting their engineers until 1969.

From 1966, Daimler began to fit an alternative engine from Perkins of Peterborough, this was their V8-510 unit, a 90-degree V8 of 8.36 litres with a conventional injection layout and a maximum output of 170 bhp at 2,800 rpm, so fitted the model code was SRP8.

The final batch of Roadliners was fitted with the British Leyland 800-series V8-810, a 13.1-litre AEC-built 90-degree V8, developing 272 bhp at 2,600 revolutions/minute, these were badged as Leylands and type SRL8. This power unit was discontinued soon after the Roadliner because it could not meet noise regulations.

Although these engines worked better than the Cummins, problems were still had with them.

=== Transmission system ===
Two problems occurred with the Daimatic transmission system; firstly with excessive wear, as with the Cummins, it was working at its design limits for power and torque, and but for the effects of altitude, it would have been way over its limits on the Pretoria buses. Secondly, drivers newly allocated the type had not driven a vehicle of equivalent power before, and most were not trained in the use of the semi-automatic gearbox, which lacked the engine-braking effect of a "solid" transmission. This resulted in many engine losses due to overspeeding; no easy way to control this was found, as the pure fluid flywheel form of transmission was used rather than a Leyland SCG-style lock-up clutch. Problems with the braking and transmission fed back on one another and exacerbated engine damage. PMT altered the change-speed control on some of its buses from electrical to pneumatic to slow down gear changes, but at the time and with the transmission system fitted, installing an effective secondary braking system was not possible.

Most of the Canadian buses had the optional Allison Transmission torque-converter transmission, but the sole survivor now has a Detroit 6V-71 engine and a Fuller layshaft gearbox.

=== Chassis ===
Handling, braking, and tyre problems seemed to be endemic regardless of the suspension system used. The rubber (Metalastic 'Toggle-Link') suspension was of a unique design and difficult and expensive to repair.

=== Body ===
Problems with wear and tear on the bodywork were caused by chassis flexing, the latter exacerbated on dual-door bodies. The optional Clayton Compas automatic heating and ventilation system was both unreliable and very noisy.

== The end ==
In 1966, Daimler launched a single-decker variant of the Fleetline and thereafter marketed the SRP8 as a coach chassis in the UK, the final demonstrator had a Plaxton semicoach body and was sold to City of Oxford Motor Service to work London expresses. In 1970, Daimler, now part of British Leyland, announced the end of Roadliner production.

== Double-decker variants ==
The Spanish example was the sole double-decker bus Roadliner; it was exported in 1967, but not bodied until 1972. Autopullman of Madrid had it fitted with a 4 m (13 ft 1 in) body by Irizar and used it for sightseeing tours.

The Daimler CRC6-36 was a double-decker bus with a modified Roadliner driveline to take 86-seat, 11 x 2.5 m double-decker bodywork with twin staircases, the rearmost rising over the engine opposite an exit door in the rear overhang. One of these was sold to Walsall Corporation, and the other 16 went to Johannesburg. The Walsall bus, shown at Earls Court in 1968, is preserved at The Transport Museum, Wythall, which also has the last working Cummins-powered Roadliner, a former Wolverhampton bus.

== Might have beens ==
Manchester Corporation persuaded Leyland to build the Leyland Panther Cub by threatening to order 33 ft (10 m) Roadliners, instead. Daimler announced a 17 ft wheelbase, 33-foot option on launch but none was ever built. SRC6-33 would have been the type code.

In 1968, a 12 m (39 ft) version was announced as the SRC-40, but the only batch ordered was later cancelled.

Prior to the BLMC merger, Sir William Lyons had commissioned an all-alloy 6.7-litre V8 turbodiesel engine from Rolls-Royce; it was derived from the petrol engine used in the Silver Shadow car, examples were on test by the time British Leyland had been formed, but the project was cancelled on the orders of BLMC chief executive Lord Stokes.
