= Howard Porter (manufacturer) =

- Founded: 1936
- Founder: Howard Porter
- Headquarters: Spearwood, Western Australia
- Products: Truck bodies
- Owner: Giulio Lombardi; Roy Lombardi
- Subsidiaries: Global Trailer Solutions
- Website: www.howardporter.com.au

Howard Porter is an Australian industrial company manufacturing semi-trailers and truck bodies.

== History ==
Howard Porter was founded in 1936 by Howard Porter in Fremantle as a coachbuilder building timber horse carts. After three generations of Porter family ownership, it was sold in the 1990s to overseas interests. In 2004 it was purchased by Giulio and Roy Lombardi. By this stage it had relocated to Spearwood.

From the 1950s until the 1990s, Howard Porter bodied buses, including many for the Metropolitan Transport Trust and its successor Transperth, and the Western Australian Government Railways and its successor Westrail. In the 1970s it built some with Custom Coaches kits. It later diversified into custom built semi-trailers and truck builds.

In 2006 rival semi trailer manufacturing business SFM Engineering was purchased. In 2010, Howard Porter completed a 320 trailer contract for the Gorgon gas project, reportedly the biggest trailer contract ever in Australia. In 2012 a subsidiary trading as Global Trailer Solutions was established in Asia.
