= Park Royal Vehicles =

British coachbuilder and bus manufacturer

Coordinates: 51.5344°N 0.2737°W

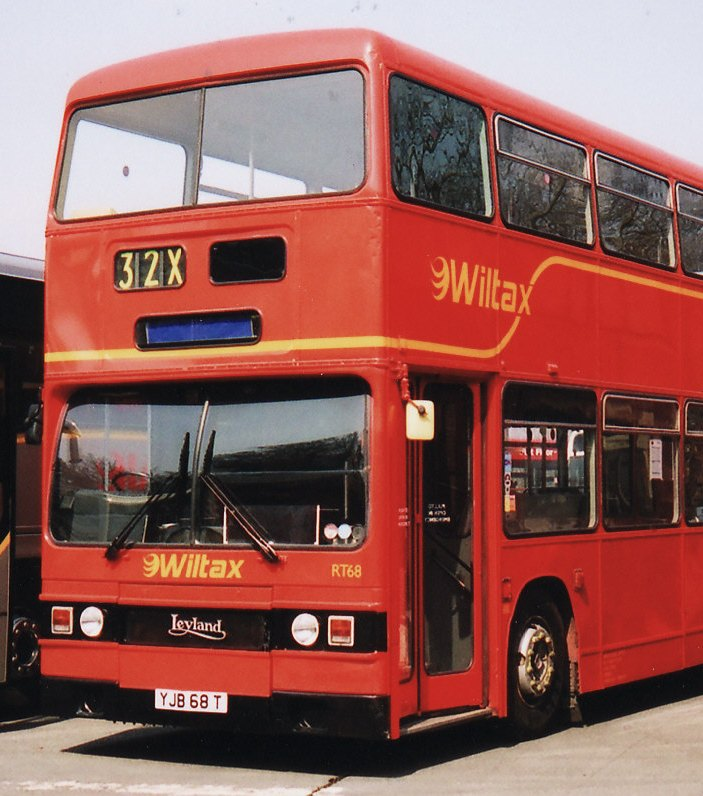
A Park Royal bodied Leyland Titan (B15).

Park Royal Vehicles was one of Britain's leading coachbuilders and bus manufacturers, based at Park Royal, Abbey Road, in west London. With origins dating back to 1889, the company also had a Leeds-based subsidiary, Charles H. Roe.

Labour problems and slowness of production led to its closure in 1980.

== History ==
Park Royal Coach Works Limited was registered as a private company on 12 April 1930 for the purposes of building and dealing in carriages, vehicles and conveyances of all kinds. It was a leading manufacturer of single and double-deck omnibuses and trolley buses.

During World War II, Park Royal produced large quantities of vehicle bodies for the Ministry of Supply, the Air Ministry and the Ministry of Aircraft Production. It also was involved in aircraft construction.

After the war, it returned to producing composite and metal frame public service bodies for customers such as the London Passenger Transport Board, the British Electrical Federation Group, the Tilling Group and many municipalities. It held patents for special coach bodies for British Overseas Airways Corporation and the RAF Transport Command.

Park Royal Vehicles Limited was incorporated as a public limited company on 8 October 1946 and acquired the whole of the share capital of Park Royal Coach Works Limited and took over its assets and undertakings and put Park Royal Coach Works into liquidation.

== Associated Commercial Vehicles ==
Associated with AEC from the 1930s in 1949 it became part of Associated Commercial Vehicles Ltd., which included AEC (the chassis manufacturer). This formidable combination of AEC and PRV supported the demanding requirements of London Transport and many other major fleet owners and operators. The famous AEC Routemaster bus was built at Park Royal.

== Leyland Motors ==
In 1962 the ACV Group merged with the Leyland Motors group to form Leyland Motor Corporation. In 1968 Leyland Motor Corporation and British Motor Holdings merged, becoming British Leyland Motor Corporation. BL (British Leyland) was nationalised by the Labour Government in 1975, following which many subsidiaries were closed, including AEC in 1979 and Park Royal in July 1980.

== Other vehicles ==
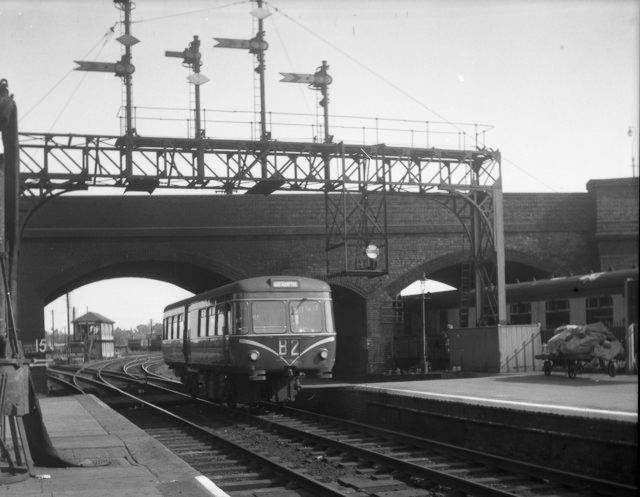
Park Royal railbus at Bedford Midland station

Park Royal was also responsible for many other coachworks besides London buses. It had a vast array of vehicles to its name including the first diesel London Taxi, a number of railcars and railbuses (e.g. the British Rail Class 103 and one of the British Rail Railbuses) and World War II vehicles. During World War II it also played a part in the production of Halifax bombers as the outer wings and engine cowlings were built at the Park Royal site. Park Royal built 150 Green Goddess fire engines between November 1954 and January 1955, with PRV body numbers B37444 - B37593 and registrations PGW51 - PGW200.
