= Leyland Titan (front-engined double-decker) =

British double-decker chassis with front-mounted engine

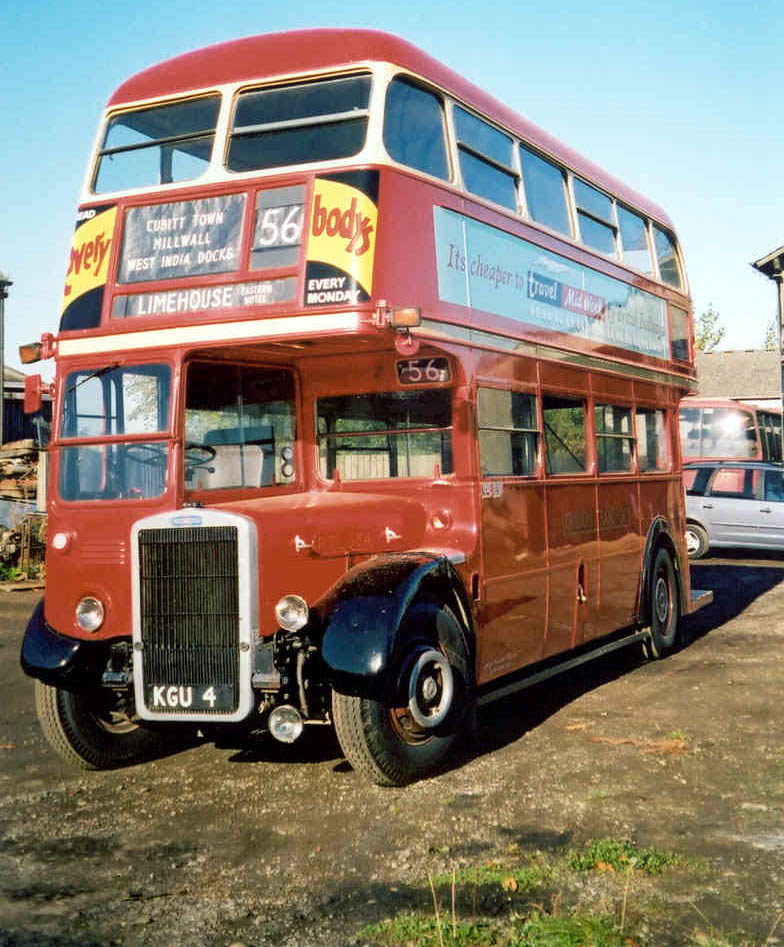
- Metro-Cammell-bodied Leyland Titan PD2-7RT, London Transport fleet number RTL554

Overview
- Manufacturer: Leyland Motors/British Leyland, Leyland and Farington Lancashire, see also Ashok Leyland
- Production: 1927–1942; 1945–1969

Body and chassis
- Doors: Generally rear open-platform, but various customer options.
- Floor type: Step entrance

Powertrain
- Engine: Leyland, 6–cylinder, petrol (until 1939) or direct-injection diesel from 1933, standard by 1938, see text.

The Leyland Titan was a forward-control chassis with a front-mounted engine designed to carry double-decker bus bodywork. It was built mainly for the United Kingdom market between 1927 and 1942, and between 1945 and 1969.

The type was widely used in the United Kingdom and it was also successful in export markets, with numerous examples shipped to Australia, Ireland, India, Spain, South Africa and many other countries. From 1946 specific export models were introduced, although all Titans were right-hand drive regardless of the rule of the road in customer countries.

After Leyland ended the production of the Leyland Titan in UK, Ashok Leyland of India took up production and marketed the bus in South Asia as the Ashok Leyland Titan, which, in much developed form, is still in production.

== Origin ==
Prior to 1924 Leyland Motors and the majority of other British commercial vehicle makers had used similar chassis frames for bus and lorry chassis, generally a simple straight ladder-type steel frame. The disadvantage for bus applications was that the saloon floor was relatively high, which gave passengers access difficulties and also caused stability and overall height problems if a double-deck was to be fitted with a top deck cover, as was increasingly becoming common on double-deck trams in the UK and had been first used on buses by Widnes Corporation in 1909. When the London General Omnibus Company, part of the Underground Electric Railways of London Group, proposed a closed-top double-decker to the group's vehicle-building subsidiary the Associated Equipment Company in 1923, the model 405 was produced, forming General's NS class; this had a frame with side members upswept over the axle mounting points so that the lower saloon floor level was about one foot lower than the preceding types 301 (K-class) and 401 (S-class). However, the Metropolitan Police, who then had the statutory responsibility for London bus construction and safety rules, refused the fitting of covered top decks on the NS class for a number of years after its introduction. Initially the NS was built exclusively for the Underground Group, and certain features – such as the four-cylinder side-valve engine and three-speed chain-drive constant-mesh transmission – were obsolescent. In 1924 Maudslay of Coventry also introduced a swept-down chassis frame on a comprehensive range of purpose-built passenger models called the ML series, although no double-deckers were catalogued until 1930.

In 1925 Leyland Motors followed suit. Unlike the competitors they had a dropped-frame double-deck model for general sale; and unlike them Leyland decided to publicise their new range of dedicated passenger models by giving them names. The single-deck chassis were named after animals, ranging in size from the 20–23-seat Leveret, then the 26–30-seat Lioness, the 32–36-seat Lion and finally the 38-seat Leopard. The double-deck on the other-hand adopted the mythical name Leviathan, designed for up to 48 seats, the same as the NS. Pneumatic tyre development for commercial vehicles was in its early stages and so although the single-deckers were designed for these, standard equipment for the Leviathan was six solid rubber tyres, two on the front axle and four on the back.

The Leviathan was not the worst seller in the range (Leverets sold around 40 and two Leopards were sold) most entered service fitted with covered tops, but unlike AEC with its captive market within the Underground Group, Leyland had to sell against competitors, and around 60 Leviathans were sold into 1927, most to municipal operators in Lancashire and Cheshire, with the largest private-sector operator being Crosville.

The majority of the UK's electric tramways had come into being about a quarter of a century earlier, and the cost of maintenance of track and the surrounding highway, as well as the cost of maintaining the overhead wiring and the generation, transmission & substation network was affecting profitability. Although the majority of tramways were owned by local councils, some were in the private sector; and although sale of electricity to domestic consumers was beginning to develop as a profit centre, the inflexibility of operation made providing new or extended routes expensive, and on-road boarding began to be seen as obstructive of other road traffic and increasingly dangerous. Although the tramcar was in general a durable vehicle and capable of much re-engineering, standards varied and by 1925 some networks were thoroughly worn out.

During 1925–26 Guy Motors and Karrier, the motor-vehicle subsidiary of the Clayton Engineering company of Huddersfield, promoted the six-wheel double-deck bus as the answer to those seeking to replace the double-deck tram. Unlike the Leviathan or the NS they ran as standard on pneumatic tyres, with two such at the end of all three axles, and at up to 30 ft (9.1 m) long, where local construction regulations permitted (there were none nationally at the time; rules were set by local councils, watch-committees or, in London, the Metropolitan Police) passenger capacity could equal or exceed that of double-deck trams. Other builders, AEC in particular (at the time in a collaboration deal with Daimler Company), followed suit, getting the drawing offices to stretch existing buses into three-axle versions.

Leyland, in particular, thought differently, and with the Lion becoming the best-selling single deck bus and coach in Britain – the "long Lion" from early 1926 proving particularly successful – almost 3,000 Lions and Lionesses (which differed only in driving position) sold by the end of the L-series three-year run, returning Leyland to profitability after catastrophic losses in the early 1920s. Leyland's chairman Henry Spurrier (the second) decided to recruit design talent to give Leyland not just a temporary advantage but long-term technical and sales supremacy. He appointed G.J. "John" Rackham in the summer of 1926 as Leyland's chief engineer and commissioned from him a complete new product range, to start with a new double-deck bus. He did this because AEC now had enough capacity to offer their 420-series double-decker (similar to the NS but with a more conventional sliding-mesh gearbox) on general sale, which with AEC's ability to loss-lead on price given its large guaranteed London orders would spell the death of the Leviathan and also because of the threat from the promoters of big six-wheelers.

Rackham had worked for AEC in the pre-World War I period. He was involved in the design of London General's B-Type bus, under Frank Searle and then George Green. During World War I he and Green worked on the Tank along with other gifted engineers such as Walter Wilson. After the war Rackham moved to the United States and under Green was chief designer for John Hertz's Yellow Coach Company, one of the leading bus-builders in the States. Rackham, under Green's direction, evolved a range of fast, relatively light chassis with powerful engines and a trademark of frames gracefully swept with elegantly varying side-member depth. The Y and Z models also had off-set underslung worm rear-axles and six-cylinder overhead-camshaft (OHC) petrol engines; OHC was not generally known in UK buses at the time, and six-cylinder engines likewise.

The only known Yellow Coach imported into the UK was fitted out in 1927 as a directors' saloon, for the use of Lord Ashfield and other directors of the Underground group. It was a luxurious mobile boardroom and pictures of it (inside and out) are available on the London Transport Museum website.

London General Omnibus Company also imported a Yellow Coach, Model Z-A-199 double deck chassis in December 1924 which was fitted with a single deck bus body and registered as no. XY 9869. Five photos of this bus, listed as '1925 LGOC saloon motor coach or charabanc', are also in the London Transport Museum Photographic collection (photo Nos. 559-563 of 5295). Both the Model Y chassis (including Lord Ashfield's 'directors' saloon') and the Model Z were designed by Rackham.

== Pre-war ==
=== TD1 ===
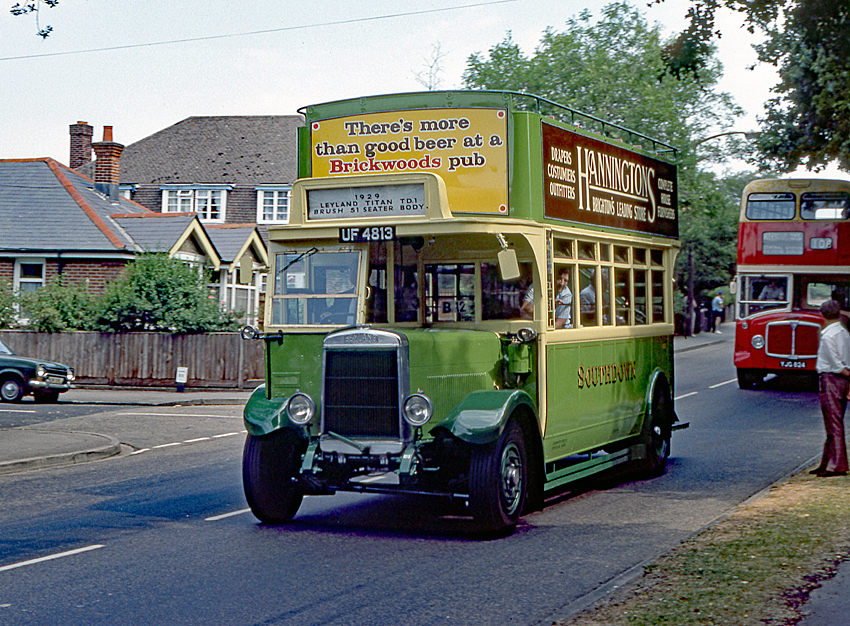
Southdown Leyland Titan TD1 open top UF 4813

The first of Rackham's new T-Type Leylands was the double-deck bus. This was the Titan TD. Rackham's use of mythological names for double-decks and animal names for single-deckers and lorries grew to be a Leyland tradition. It and the single deck Tiger TS1 equivalent were announced at the London Olympia Motor Show of 1927 after an intense development period.

"They represented an immense advance on what had gone before, either at Leyland or elsewhere. It was not so much that the features were all new — most had been seen in isolation before — but the combination of them in one vehicle and the overall concept of the vehicles set a cracking pace for competitors, which left most of them so far behind it took them years to catch up," said former AEC employee Alan Townsin.

An important feature of the new Leyland buses was the engine; it was a six-cylinder overhead-camshaft petrol engine of 6.8 litres displacement, developing between 90 and 98 bhp at up to 2,200 rpm. Other drive-line features were a single-plate clutch driving into a four-speed sliding-mesh gearbox; these were mounted as a unit with the engine. The drive-line featured subtle inclination of engine and transmission, allowing straight drive shafts into the underslung worm-wheel single-reduction rear axle – which had the differential offset to the offside to reduce gangway floor height on the lower deck. Vacuum-servo brakes on all four wheels were standard between Tiger and Titan, but the Titan had a near right-angle drop in its frame after the rearmost spring-mounting to provide a low passenger entry platform.

Leyland Motors already had its own coachworks established just after the Great War, next to Leyland in the neighbouring parish of Farington. It was on stream by 1921, and most Lions and many Lionesses had been bodied there; a pre-Rackham feature was that Leyland Motors would also license the designs to other coachworks, but would take to law those building "pirated" Leyland designs. A significant difference between these forerunners and the body for the Titan is that it was patented. It was the first lowbridge double-deck bus body and as a result of the offset upper-deck gangway with four-abreast seating to the nearside the Titan could carry 48 or more seated passengers and yet within a 25 ft (7.6 m) long body have an overall height of less than 13 feet 1 inch (3.99 m), with a covered top – a height about 2 ft (0.61 m) less than the Leviathan or the NS. A Titan on pneumatic tyres, with the standard Leyland body, weighed less than 5 5/8 tonnes unladen. This meant that as standard a Titan could carry pneumatic tyres of the same type proven with Lions and other competitive single-deckers. Pneumatic tyres on a heavy vehicle at the time meant it could legally travel at 20 mph rather than 12 mph for solids. Not only was height and weight less than competing six-wheelers, so was price.

At this time Leyland had by far the best bus advertising in the trade press, only Albion Motors coming anywhere near. Albion sold on low first cost and fuel economy, while saying that they were "As Sure As The Sunrise" in reliability; but Leyland's advertising had the "Zoo" names to fix individual models in customers' minds, and in particular they used a photograph of the original TD1 prototype TD9522, passing underneath the 15 ft (4.6 m) mediaeval Stonebow in Lincoln with clearance to spare, which they accompanied with the slogan "Bury your trams: mark their passing with Titans." Lincoln City Transport had the first production TD1, which was exhibited at Olympia prior to delivery.

2,352 TD1s were built up to 1931; most of them carried either the Leyland body or licensed copies. From 1929 a version of the standard body was available with the rear stairs enclosed, following contemporary tramway practice, and by 1930 Leyland offered its own "Hybridge" body, with central gangways on both upper and lower decks, to a height of roughly 14 ft 6 in (4.42 m).

=== TD2 ===
By 1931, the competitors had caught up, especially AEC, whose Regent began to enter service in 1930, a double-blow for Leyland was that it and all of the contemporary 6-series AEC commercial range was designed by the same G.J. Rackham who had come up with Leyland's T-series. He was, on completion of that task, lured to Middlesex by Lord Ashfield on a substantially larger salary than Leyland felt it could pay him.

Due to their unreliability, extra cost in maintenance and petrol and inherent inflexibility, with both tyre-scrub and driveline wind-up being endemic problems, the big petrol six-wheelers had generally been seen-off by the Titan, Guy was saved by War Department contracts and trolleybus orders, but Karrier went into liquidation, eventually being bought from its receivers by Rootes Group, who used the 6X4 design experience to re-focus Karrier as a trolleybus maker, moving production from Huddersfield to the Commer works in Luton.

Also the Road Traffic Act 1930 had been enacted; as well as promoting consolidation between operators, for the first time maximum dimensions and laden weight were standard for buses and commercial vehicles across Great Britain and Northern Ireland. Maximum width was now 7 feet 6 inches (2.29 m), and for a two-axle double deck the UK maximum length was 26 ft (7.9 m), with a gross vehicle weight of 10 tons, the new length was about a foot more than the Titan was originally designed for. As a result, the engine was increased in bore, the rear-axle was revised to the fully floating pattern and the brakes revised to a triple-servo system. larger tyres were also fitted.

Leyland body sales dropped as other makers could use the heavier-duty TD2 to carry more passengers, also by 1933, the TD2, sharing the frontal design of the TD1, looked out of date. Although about 1,000 TD2s had been sold to 1933, and some later examples had important technical developments it was, at end of production, a model out of time.

=== TD3 ===
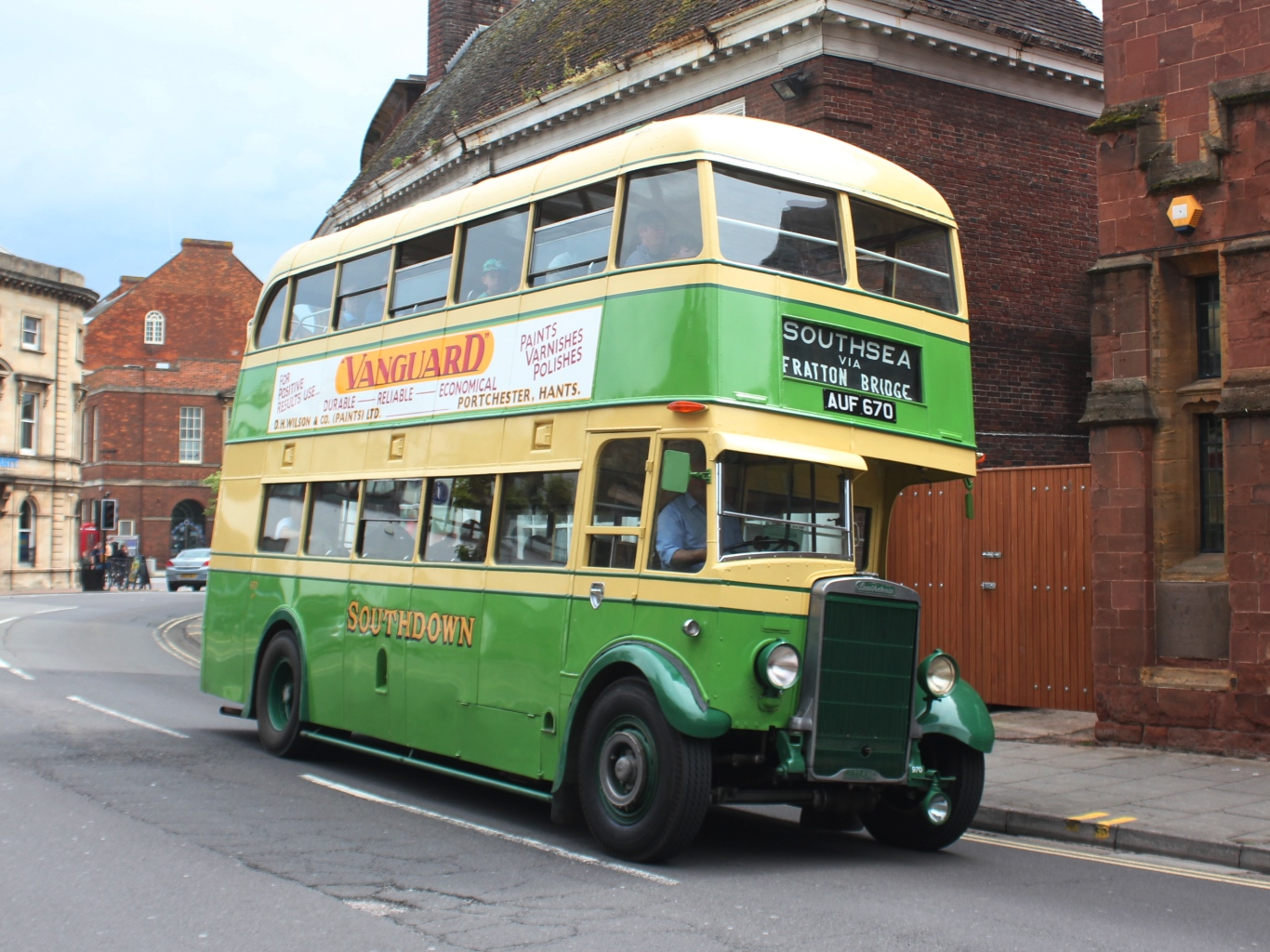
Southdown TD3 970 (AUF670)

Produced from mid-1933, the TD3, like the contemporary Tiger TS6, had a redesigned, more compact front-end layout, which saved 6 inches (150 mm) in engine and cab length, thus allowing coachbuilders to add an extra row of seats within the 26-foot body. Some TD2s had pioneered options that became available on the TD3, such as an 8.6-litre direct-injection diesel engine and torque converter transmission. Leyland PSVs with the latter feature carried "Gearless Bus" lettering on the radiator and had the type-suffix "c". For example, Blackpool and Wallasey were customers for the TD3c, (Wallasey had withdrawn all of its Karrier six wheelers after a mechanical failure caused a fatal accident), with the standard manual transmission changed to the "silent-third" version with constant-mesh engagement, Leyland using helical gears for that ratio. With the TD3, Leyland switched from hardwood to steel for framing their standard bodies.

=== TD4 ===
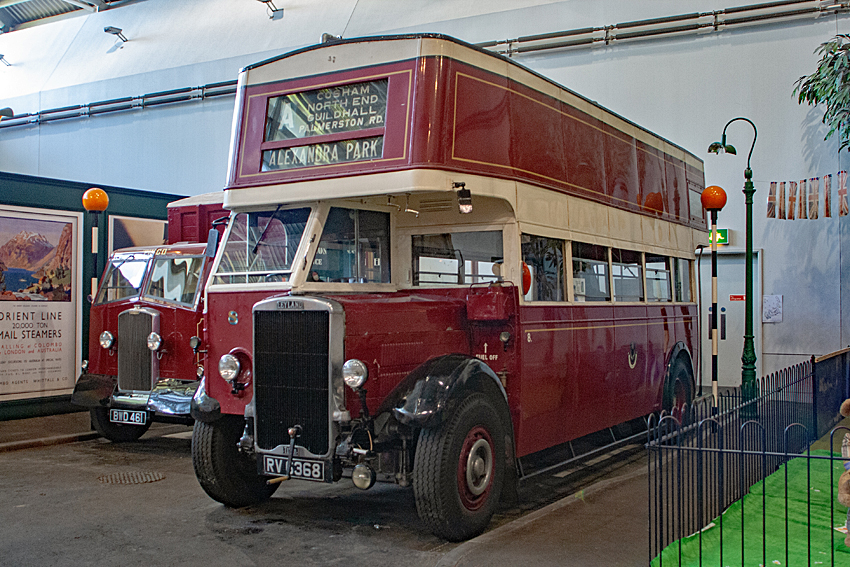
Portsmouth Corporation open top Leyland Titan TD4

From 1935, the TD4 had a change of braking system from vacuum to vacuum/hydraulic. The 8.6-litre diesel grew to be the majority-choice engine and the Leyland body was redesigned under LPTB influence and the direction of Colin Bailey, recruited from Metro-Cammell to head Leyland's coachworks and revise Leyland's previous body design, which initially had some embarrassing structural failures, the revised body for general sale being derived from LPTB trolleybuses. In 1936–7, London Transport bought 100 TD4s, classed as STDs, with Leyland bodies to a revised outline, in the style of the contemporary STLs (see below).

=== TD5 ===
From 1937, a 24-volt electrical system and the oil-engine, both previously optional, became standard, the frame had greater depth over the front wheel arches and a new 7.4-litre push-rod overhead-valve (OHV) petrol engine, known within Leyland as the Mark III, was built for Bournemouth and Eastbourne.

=== TD6 ===
Only built for Birmingham, during 1938–39, and only with the torque-converter transmission, The TD6c was mainly different from the TD5c in having a flexible engine mounting.

=== TD7 ===
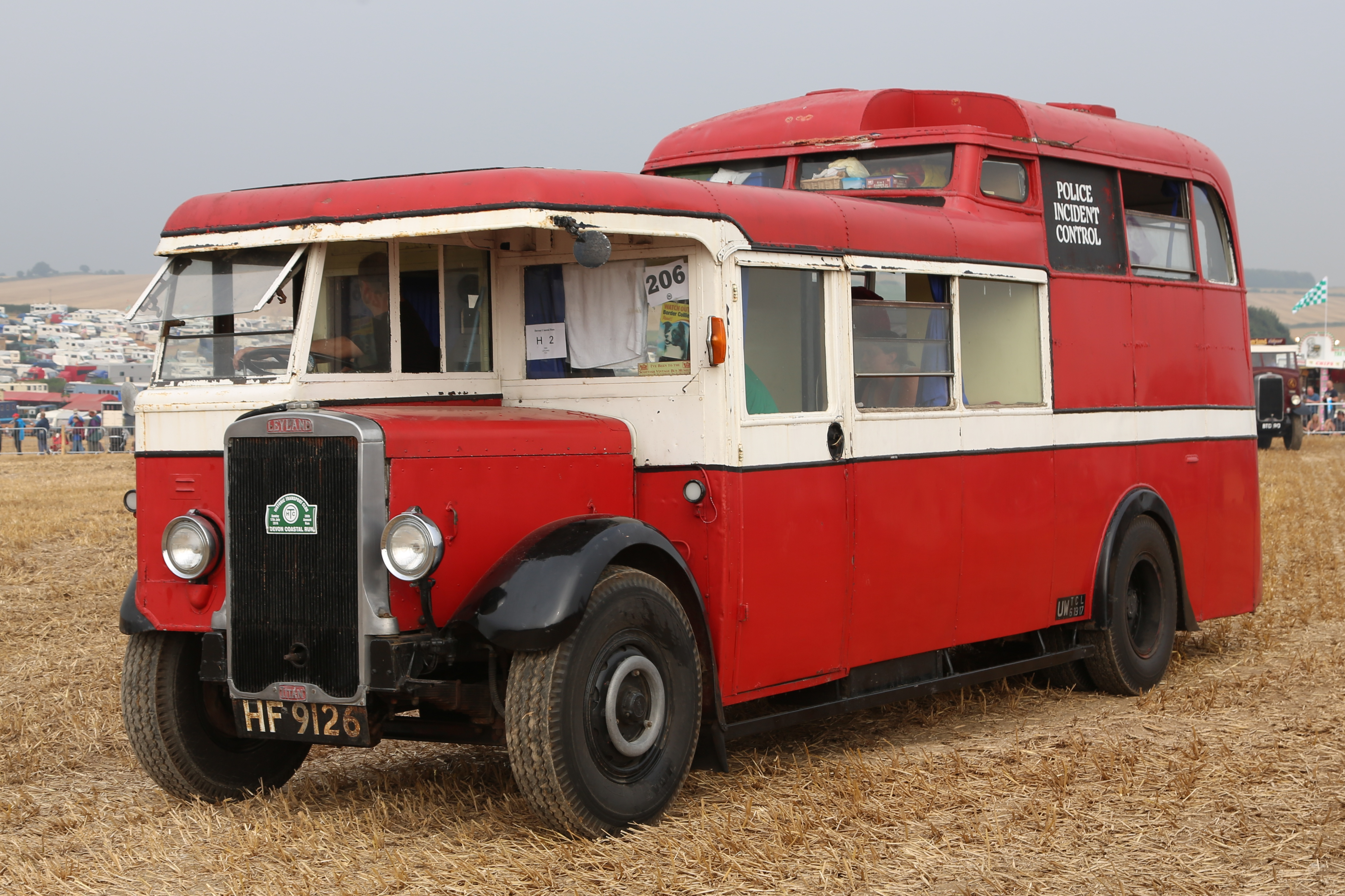
A Leyland TD7 Titan that was later used as a mobile control unit by Lancashire Police

The final pre-war Titan, and built with the TD5s, it had a flexible engine mounting and a larger flywheel. Most of them and some late TD5s were frozen in production by government order with the Fall of France in May 1940. In late 1941, the TD5 and TD7 stocks were "un-frozen" and finished, so that the Titan line could be closed, enabling the space at Leyland to be cleared for tank-building. Some TD7s became utility buses (part of the STD class) with London Transport, Midland Red, etc. and the rest became Fire Brigade turntable ladder bases in London and other cities. The June 2012 edition of Vintage Roadscene magazine claims, in an article on these, that they had the 5.7-litre four-cylinder petrol engine otherwise used in the LT9 Lion. If that is so, these were the only Titans built on the line at Leyland with other than the six-cylinder engines, although a number of fleets, particularly in the Tilling Group, were, by the late 1930s, re-fitting petrol-powered Titans during overhaul with five-cylinder Gardner 5LW diesel units. The Scottish Motor Traction group had used standard Leyland diesels to convert its entire Titan fleet by 1936.

=== TD8 ===
This was to have been a standard Leyland wartime utility bus, with 500 commissioned by the Ministry of Supply: a Leyland Utility body was constructed by October 1941, but, in a change of Government policy, Guy Motors were commissioned to build 500 chassis to the same outline drawings as the TD8, and Leyland's output for the duration was centred upon tanks. These Guy buses were the first of the famous utility Guy Arab Is and IIs, the earliest being bodied in early 1942. TD9 was used internally for the design work on what would become the post-war PD1 and PD2 Titans.

=== The Titanic ===
Despite G J Rackham's scepticism about the three-axle double-deck bus, Leyland built a derivative of the Titan to cater for this market and named it the Titanic. Unlike the rather short-lived Karrier and Guy six-wheelers, but like the slightly later AEC Renown, it had an inter-axle differential to obviate drive-line wind-up. It sold only in limited numbers from 1927 to 1939. Many of its features were shared with the Titan and the rest with the standard three-axle Leyland trolleybus line. What success there was of the AEC Renown bus and Leyland three-axle trolleybus designs was primarily through large orders by London Transport.

== Post war ==
=== PD1 ===
Unlike AEC, who initially re-introduced pre-war models, Leyland announced in 1945 for 1946 delivery a brand new Titan, with only the front axle being similar to that of the TD7. All other components were new, although the standard Leyland steel-framed body was similar in structure and outline to the pre-war model, with the lower saloon seats re-spaced, the cab slightly extended and widened, a larger offside window and the upper saloon roof could be panelled on the inside for the first time. P is believed by some to stand for post-war, but the feeling within Leyland was that it stood for Passenger, the D stood for double-deck and the Titan PD1 which was developed under the TD9 designation was directly comparable to the Tiger PS1.

Among the new features was the E181 7.4-litre engine, which was a development of a pre-war 6.2-litre unit used in some TS8 Tigers and the sole LS1 prototype. The revised bore dimensions came from the version used in later models of the Matilda tank. It was a six-cylinder pushrod OHV unit, which developed 100 bhp at 1.800 rpm and 328 lb ft of torque at 1,150 rpm. These were slightly better figures than the larger pre-war design 8.6-litre OHC engine, but fuel economy was also superior, although it was a much harsher-sounding engine. The TD7's flexible engine mounting was not 100% successful and so the PD1 reverted to a rigid engine mounting. The gearbox was a four-speed and reverse constant-mesh unit, with helical gear trains for second and third gear. Brakes, as standard, were triple-servo vacuum. A new, larger, radiator was fitted and its filler-cap was offset to the nearside to allow the driver's cab to be wider, the nearside windscreen pillar running down the vehicle centre-line.

Dimensions of the PD1 were 26 ft (7.9 m) long by 7 ft 6 in (2.29 m) in wide. Although there was a specific export model, Leyland supplied the PD1 to two export customers who required Leyland's own coachwork, these were South Western Bus Service in Ceylon and Lisbon Tramways, the latter having the staircase and entry positions transposed to suit right hand running. Over the years of production there were a number of variants, which were as follows:

- PD1A: This version was introduced in Autumn 1946. The only difference between this and the standard PD1, was that rubber bushes sourced from Metalastic Ltd were used in place of copper bushes in the spring shackles. It seems this produced a more stable bus, notably Barton Transport had an initial tilt-test failure when they, in 1957, first re-fitted a 7 ft 6 in (2.29 m) wide Tiger PS1/1 Chassis with an 8 ft (2.4 m) wide double deck body, but fitting PD1A style spring bushes cured the problem. From early 1947, the PD1A had supplanted the PD1 in production. This variant, like the PD1, sold generally across the UK. Barton, for instance, took PD1s in 1946 and PD1As in 1947, all with bespoke forward-entrance lowbridge bodies by Duple. A number of PD1As had standard Leyland outline bodies, licence-built by Walter Alexander Coachbuilders. Two of these were supplied in completely knocked down (CKD) form for the Londonderry & Lough Swilly Railway Company, who had them assembled in Londonderry. These were the first of many CKD Alexander bodies, construction of such, later, becoming a speciality. The SMT group also took Leyland-style Alexander bodies and the British Transport Commission had examples with Eastern Coach Works bodies of similar appearance to those on their standard Bristol K series double-deckers; in addition Bristol Tramways and Carriage Company had similar bodies built by its own Brislington Body Works and local private-sector coachbuilder Longwell Green Coachworks.
- PD1/1: This version was supplied exclusively to the City Coach Company of Brentwood, whose main service was an inter-urban run from Wood Green in East London to Southend-on-Sea in Essex, the twenty vehicles being delivered to City with bodies by Alexander, J.C. Beadle of Rochester and Charles Roberts of Wakefield, completed in 1946/7. It's not clear why these vehicles had a different suffix number, Alan Townsin says "The designation PD1/1 also appeared in some records, but seems to have been based on an incorrect surmise, The City Coach vehicles in question evidently being standard PD1." although it may be that they had higher-ratio back axles, when specified elsewhere this did not give rise to a new suffix.
- PD1/2: This version comprised thirty vehicles, all supplied to Bolton Corporation during 1947. Fifteen had Northern Counties bodies and 15 Manchester-style bodies by Crossley. These were all 56 seaters (H30/26R) and they had the same dimensions as the standard PD1, but the brakes were air-pressure operated, the first use of this on a production Leyland bus. Bolton were early in the UK in standardising on air brakes
- PD1/3: In Autumn 1946, the Construction and Use regulations were revised, allowing a maximum width for buses of 8 ft (2.4 m), rather than the previous 7 ft 6 in (2.29 m), provided the Traffic Commissioners approved the use of wider buses on routes, in the same way as they already had the power to approve double-deck buses on a route-by-route basis. Also, the gross vehicle weight for a double-deck bus was increased to 12 tons, from the wartime figure of 11 tons. The PD1/3 differed from the PD1 in that it had wider axles, being designed for the 8-foot width. Oldham Corporation quickly obtained clearance for all their routes and in 1947 DBU244 with Charles H. Roe H31/25R body became the first 8-foot-wide motorbus built for service in the UK. Oldham took in total 50 similar buses in 1947/8. Manchester Corporation were also early customers for the wider bus, following up their initial 1946 batch of fifty PD1s with a 1947-8 order for 100 PD1/3 with 58-seat (H32/26R) bodies to their standard outline by Metro-Cammell. During 1948 Ribble Motor Services, who had obtained permission to use full-width double-deck coaches on their express services from East Lancashire to Blackpool, received 30 such bodies by H. V. Burlingham of Blackpool, which had full-width cabs, electrically powered folding doors to the rear platform, which itself was built-up to saloon level, allowing a small luggage boot. The body design, with additional luggage stowage over the rear wheel arches, had generously radial windows, two sunroofs on the upper deck and, although of lowbridge layout (the Leyland patent on this expired in 1937), were fitted out to full coach standards for 49 passengers (FCL27/22RD). Liberal use was made of chromium-plated steel trim and they carried the cream coach livery, with red relief, rather than the bus livery of red with cream relief, they soon became famous as the "White Ladies" was so successful that a further twenty similar vehicles on PD2/3 chassis with East Lancashire Coachbuilders bodies, were added in 1951.

The PD1 range ceased to be catalogued at the end of 1947, replaced by the PD2, which had been announced at the end of 1946 but, in 1952, Central SMT took a final batch of PD1A with standard Leyland lowbridge bodies; ironic in that Central was the first operator to use the PD2 prototype to carry passengers, which is why it carried the Lanarkshire registration CVA430. They also took PD2s in 1948, 1950, 1951 and subsequently, also taking PD1As in 1949, However, Central jealously guarded its reputation as the most profitable fleet in the Scottish Group, one reason for which was its fierce cost-control.

Over 5,000 7.4-litre engined Leyland buses were built, but the majority of those were Tigers, mainly because the PS1 lasted longer in volume production. Nevertheless, about 1,950 PD1 Titans were built, mostly between 1945 and 1948.

=== OPD1 ===
Titan OPD1 was the first Leyland bus designed specifically for export, O stood for Overseas. It had a similar frame to the home-market PD1, albeit made of marginally thicker steel but the dimensions were larger, wheelbase went up to 17 ft 6 in (5.33 m) compared to the 16 ft 3 in (4.95 m) of the PD1, it was designed to take bodies up to 27 ft 6 in (8.38 m) long, 18 inches (0.46 m) longer than regulations allowed for the home-market model. The other major difference to the PD1 was that it (and the similar Tiger OPS1) were still fitted with the pre-war pattern 8.6-litre OHC engine, by then numbered E174.

The largest market was in New South Wales, Australia with the Department of Government Transport taking ninety of the 93 exported there during 1946/7, with H33/28R bodies, half by Clyde Coachbuilders and the rest by Commonwealth Engineering. Córas Iompair Éireann, the Irish state transport operator, bodied twenty for its own use, H36/30R to its own licence-built Leyland-derived design. It added them to the R-class, established with Dublin United Transport Company's first all-Leyland TD4 in 1935. Madrid Municipal Transport took East Lancashire Coachbuilders bodies with right hand drive and passenger entrance on five OPD1s and two OPD1A, believed the only such built, all seven of these carried large plates on the engine cover reading "El Ómnibus Ingles Leyland" which is perhaps best translated as "Leyland, The English Bus". Other markets for the OPD1 were South Africa where 31 had locally built bodies, most going to the Cape Tramways group in Cape Town and Cape Province, and Argentina, where 34 were ordered by Leyland's concessionary Prudens Lda., some of which were bodied as 31-seat single-deck coaches: Argentina being a major customer for similar but longer Tigers.

=== PD2 (non-London 26-foot versions) ===
The E181 was regarded by Leyland as an interim power unit, a stop-gap until a better power-plant came on-stream, thus the initial post war Leyland lorry so powered was called the "Interim Beaver". The definitive power-plant for full-size post war Leylands began to be fitted to Beavers, Octopuses, Steers, Hippos etc. from 1946. Leyland at this time stopped using the E-number system for engines (at least externally). This new power unit was named after its displacement in cubic inches (US technical influence during World War II led to a standardisation in the British heavy-vehicle market on Imperial dimensions until the late 1960s). Thus was named the Leyland O.600, O for oil, which was British engineering parlance at the time for compression-ignition engines rather than naming the German Rudolf Diesel, and 600 for a 600 cubic inch swept volume, equating to 9.8 litres. The only contemporary heavy vehicle compression-ignition engines built in Britain of equivalent displacement were the AEC 9.6-litre (from 1939) and the Albion 9.1-litre (from 1937). In its application to the Titan, the O.600 was rated at 125 bhp at 1,800 rpm, with peak torque of 410 lb ft at only 900 rpm, these increases in performance resulted in an under-stressed engine, capable of giving lively yet economic performance, with unprecedented, and it seems unsurpassed ability to run day-in, day-out between overhauls. A major structural feature of the O.600 was that the dry-liner cylinder block and crank-case were cast as a unit, the first production UK heavy vehicle engine to feature this, although by 1945 Leyland had detail drawings of a similar but smaller engine design commissioned by the UK Government during the war from Napier which was to become the Leyland 300. Like the 7.4-litre engine the 600 was a six-cylinder direct-injection pushrod overhead valve unit, but the cylinder head was split into two, with each head and gasket unit covering three-cylinder bores, other important features designed to enhance reliability were a gear driven, rather than chain drive, camshaft, mounted lower in the block; a nitrided crankshaft running in strip-bearings and chromium-plated piston-rings. The 600 which was also much quieter than the 7.4 continued in production until 1972, becoming almost legendary in its renown.

Although design work on the PD2 had started during wartime under the working title "9.8-litre TD9" it was much more than a PD1 with a bigger engine, the frame was completely redesigned, with the longitudinal members carefully graded in depth so that no part was overstressed nor over-engineered. The 600 was fitted into the chassis on a three-point flexible mounting and after a larger clutch unit the new gearbox which still had helical gear trains in second and third now also had synchromesh operation on all but first and reverse, a pioneering feature in a full-size production British bus chassis.

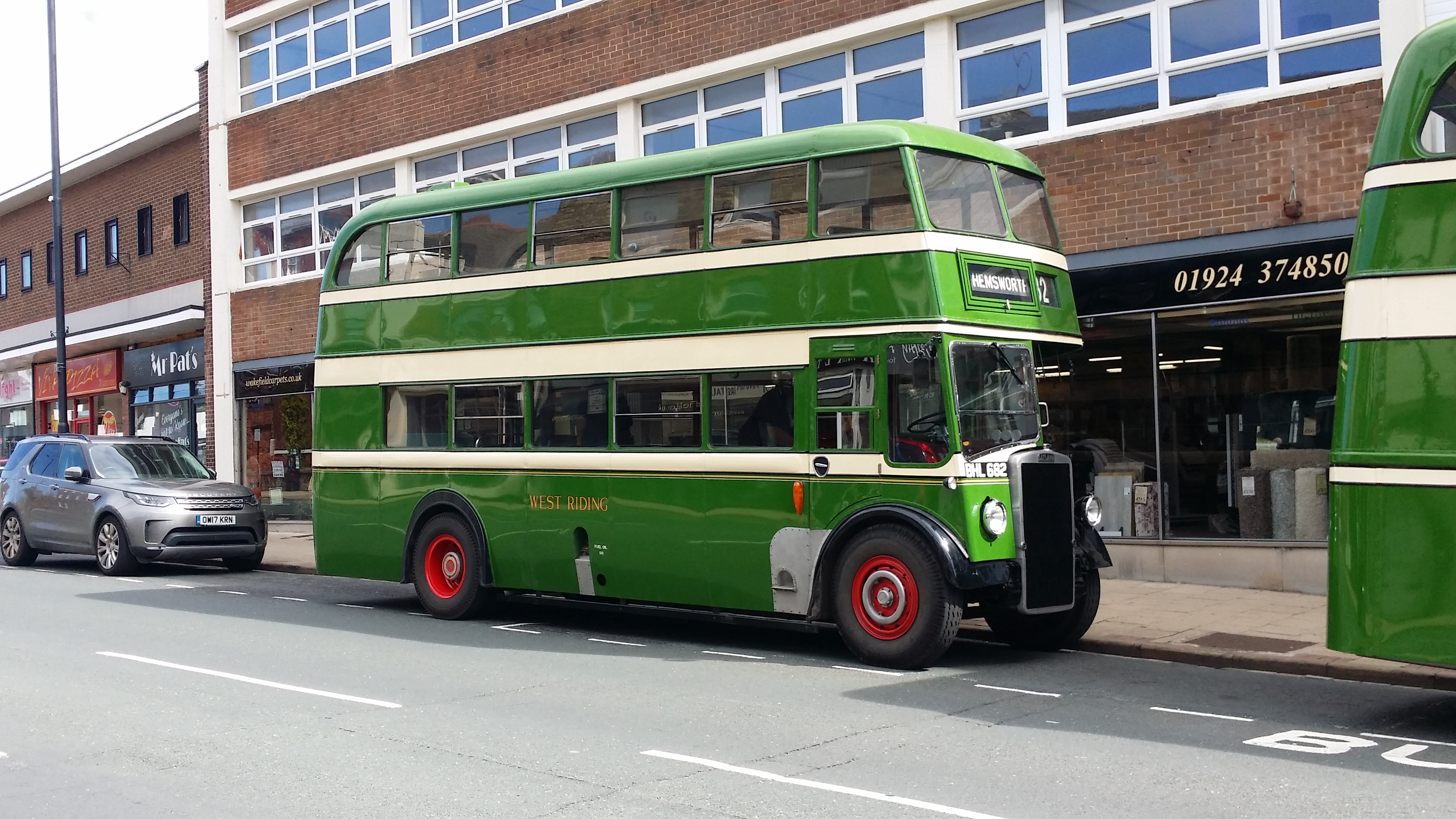
Preserved Leyland PD2/1 BHL 682

PD2/1: Although the prototype was called PD2 when it appeared in 1946, carrying an Alexander-built Leyland design body identical to those on PD1, and carrying the evocative (and very non-standard) chassis number EX1, it was decided that the initial production version would be called the PD2/1. The PD2/1 shared 26 ft (7.9 m) by 7 ft 6 in (2.29 m) chassis dimensions and 16 ft 3 in (4.95 m) wheelbase with the PD1, and had a similar triple-servo vacuum braking system, the first true PD2/1 (a pre-production bus) was chassis number 470848 which had the first standard Leyland body for the PD2, it went to Birmingham Corporation, who registered it HOJ396 and operated it until 1968. Central SMT had a PD1 with PD2 engine and transmission, chassis number 47009, which they registered CVA391. The first production PD2/1 complete with Leyland body went to Todmorden Joint Omnibus Committee, in July 1947 and another early example went to the Northern Ireland Road Transport Board. Birmingham Corporation Transport followed up its initial interest by taking no fewer than 200 with bodies by Brush Coachworks Ltd (100), Leyland and Park Royal (50 each) until 1949 as part of a complete fleet replacement which ran from 1946 to 1954 and included tramway and trolleybus replacement. The standard Leyland body for the PD2 differed only slightly from that on the PD1, by having the front offside mudguard extended around the front of the cab, where the PD1 had the cab front panel sweeping down to a lower level. The West Riding Automobile Company of Wakefield took 65 Leyland-bodied PD2/1 buses and one, BHL682, has been preserved at the Dewsbury Bus Museum and restored to "as built" condition. A 1948 example for Weardale Motor Services, KPT 909, is preserved as part of the Science Museum Group holdings.

PD2/2 was reserved for an air-braked 7 ft 6 in (2.29 m) wide Titan, but it became one of a number of codes raised but not produced.

PD2/3 was the type code for the 8 ft (2.4 m) wide vacuum-braked version, in order to use standard front-glazing in both versions of the standard Leyland body, the version for the PD2/3 had a marked inward taper toward the front, starting at the lower-saloon bulkhead, which feature continued on all wide Titans bodied by Leyland until 1954.

PD2/4 was the air-braked equivalent of the PD2/3. A total of 125 were built between 1948 and 1950, with Bolton Corporation taking 100 with Leyland bodies, and Bury Corporation the remaining 25 with Weymann bodies.

PD2/5 had only one customer, Blackpool Corporation, which took 100 between 1949 and 1951. These had H. V. Burlingham fully fronted central-entrance bodies, to a similar streamlined outline to the resort's famous trams. The type was mechanically identical to the PD2/4, but to accommodate the body the frame had a re-shaped nearside chassis longitudinal to reduce step height on the air-powered two-leaf sliding entrance doorway, and no down-sweep after the rearmost spring hanger.

Another variant for which a code was raised was for a Manchester order for 8 ft (2.4 m) wide vacuum-braked Titans without the rear drop-frame extension, as Manchester's standard body was designed to carry the rear entry platform without chassis-framing, initially to be PD2/6, these were coded PD2/3.

=== OPD2 ===
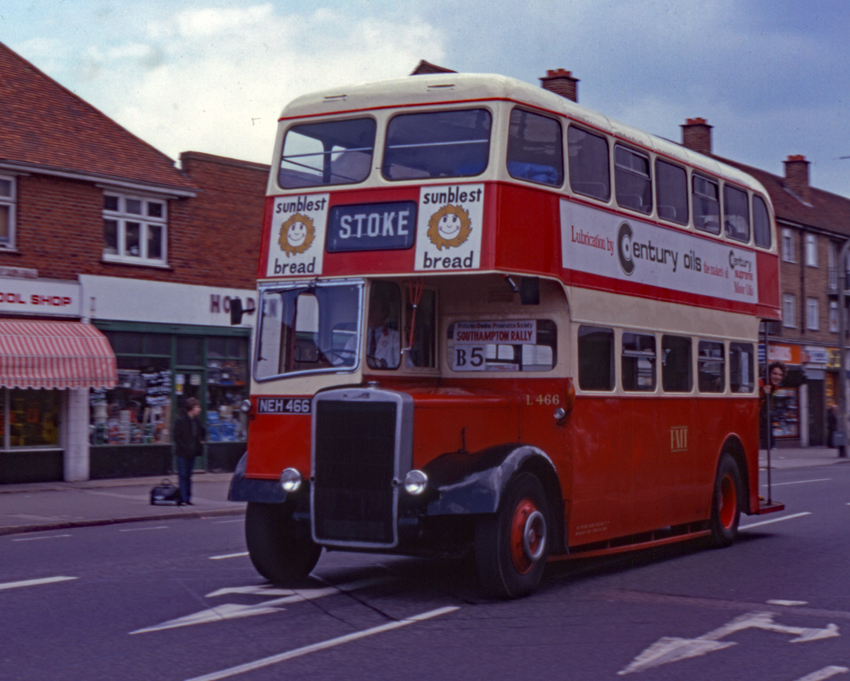
Potteries Motor Traction Leyland OPD2/1

The OPD2 combined the revised frame and driveline of the PD2 with the dimensions of the OPD1, thus it had a 17 ft 3 in (5.26 m) wheelbase suitable for a maximum bodied length of 27 ft 6 in (8.38 m), with 8 ft (2.4 m) width standard; the only other differences from it and the PD2 was that the frame was made of 9/32 in (7.1 mm) rather than 1/4 in (6.4 mm) steel and the rear axle worm-wheel was of a slightly larger diameter; only two versions were catalogued, the OPD2/1 had vacuum brakes and the OPD2/2 air. The largest customer was Córas Iompair Éireann who took over 500, as well as one batch of 100 PD2/3 with Bolton-style Leyland bodies and a further 50 all-Leyland PD2/1 and PD2/3 from a frustrated Cape Town order, the rest of which was shared between THC Crosville and Hants & Dorset (these were the only PD2s sold to THC) and BET-group Ribble, they were the first Highbridge buses with Ribble and the only full height buses to be bought by Hants & Dorset. Another export customer to take domestic-type Titans was South Western Bus Company of Ceylon which took a batch of standard all-Leyland PD2/1 in 1949. After CIÉ the largest customer for the OPD2 was the New South Wales DGT who took over 300, triple-sourcing its double deck requirement with AEC Regents and Albion Venturers.

=== The RTL and RTW ===
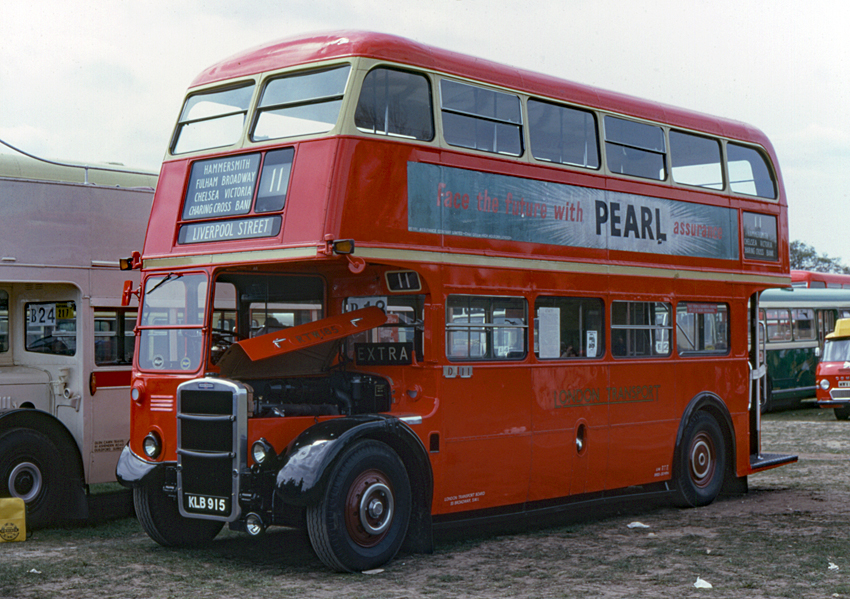
RTW185 Leyland PD2/3 Titan on Southampton Common

Since its formation as a statutory corporation in 1933, the London Passenger Transport Board had a 30-year contractual obligation to source 75% of its buses from AEC, and in 1938–39 worked with AEC on a revised version of the Regent to better suit London operating practice, following on from the 100 experimental STD Titan TD4s of 1936. It had a large-displacement engine running under less stress, with other innovative features being an air-pressure system, not only working the brakes, but also the change-speed pedal on the pre-selective gearbox, which was built by AEC to Self-Changing Gears and Daimler Company patents. This was coded RT and the initial 151 built had LT chassis codes 1RT and 2RT and entered service between early 1939 and early 1942.

After the war, AEC got the initial order for a further revised version, LT chassis code 3RT, which was designed in conjunction with the Aldenham Bus Overhaul Works to be jig-built and regularly overhauled on a flow-line system, processes gained from wartime Halifax bomber production. It took some time for AEC to get the RT into production and for 1946–48, LT took provincial-type Regents and Leyland Titan PD1s as stop-gap double-deckers. By 1947, AEC had the RT in production, but it could not build enough of them quickly enough for LT, so they asked Leyland to supplement production, from 1949. The initial LT version of the PD2 had a frame identical in shape to the 3RT, and a similar low bonnet, with a radiator outline, unlike the standard Titan. The Leyland O.600 engines were to be supplied without the standard air-cleaner to the engine induction, because LT did not believe in them. One other difference between the RT and the standard PD2, was that the wheelbase was one inch longer, at 16 ft 4 in (4.98 m), identical to the AEC RT, in order to standardise body mountings. The steering column was also more upright than standard PD2s for the same reason. Like the 3RT, there was no frame aft of the rearmost spring mounting, the rear-platform being cantilevered from the bodywork. AEC-produced steering and pre-selective transmission units were included, as were air-pressure brakes. The fluid flywheel and epicyclic gearbox were mounted separately in the chassis from the engine.

Because LT chose the heavier-gauge steel for the chassis and the larger rear axle worm-wheel was specified, Leyland initially coded the London orders OPD2LT, but later called the RTL type, PD2-7RT and the 8' wide RTW, PD2-6RT, following their LT engineering codes. As in the past, not only with buses, but also with trolleybuses, LT tended to give production of standard types to AEC and work with Leyland on experimental or innovative types, thus 500 of the Leyland order had Leyland-built 8 ft (2.4 m) wide bodies, which, initially, LT were going to class as RTL1-500, so the first of the 7 ft 6 in (2.29 m) wide version entered service as RTL501, some months before the RTWs, as London decided to re-classify the wide-bodied all-Leyland versions. As well as RTL501, a further 1,630 narrow Titan PD2-7RT were produced for London, production running into 1954.

=== Longer PD2s ===
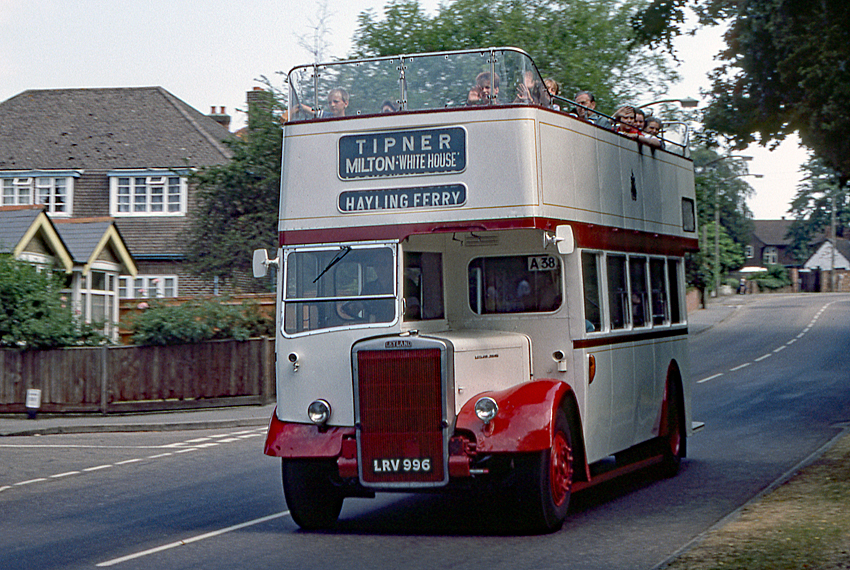
Portsmouth Corporation open top Leyland PD2/12 MCW

In June 1950 there was a further revision to the Construction and Use Regulations. 8 ft (2.4 m) width no longer required special permission (by that time the Metropolitan Police were allowing RTWs to work in Central London, even including Westminster) and the maximum length for double-deckers was increased to 27 ft (8.2 m); as a result Leyland raised a new set of variant codes for the PD2, these having a wheelbase of 16 ft 5 in (5.00 m). The standard Leyland body was revised also.

The new type codes for the Titan were:

- PD2/10: 7 ft 6 in (2.29 m) wide, vacuum brakes
- PD2/11: 7 ft 6 in (2.29 m) wide, air brakes
- PD2/12: 8 ft (2.4 m) wide, vacuum brakes
- PD2/13: 8 ft (2.4 m) wide, air brakes

Of these most found general favour, but the only customer for the PD2/11 was Leeds which took 20 in 1955. Another model almost exclusive to Leeds was the PD2/14 which was similar but had an AEC fluid flywheel and pre-selective gearbox of the type fitted to the RTL and RTW; Leeds took ten of the eleven built, the other going to Walsall.

Another rare variant was the PD2/9, which was almost identical to the PD2/10, save that the chassis was modified to accept a lower-profile central-gangway double-deck body, built to around 14 ft (4.3 m) high, about 6 in lower than normal for a "highbridge" design. All nine of these were built for St Helen's Corporation, and bodied by D.J. Davies of Merthyr Tydfil.

NTF9 was a PD2/12 as built in early 1953 but was converted to air-brakes when it was the first bus to receive a prototype Pneumocyclic gearbox. Sometimes quoted as PD2/15, it carried a standard Leyland body. After demonstration duties was sold around 1955 to T & E Docherty, part of the A1 Service consortium running buses around Kilmarnock; it continued in service with A1 until the mid-1970s.

=== Tin fronts ===
One hundred all-Leyland PD2/12s were ordered for 1952–53 delivery by the Birmingham and Midland Motor Omnibus Company, better known by its informal title Midland Red. These were to have four-leaf electrically powered platform doors and other new features, the most important of which cosmetically was that they were to conform to BMMO's own-build double decks since 1946 (and most of Birmingham Corporation's since 1949) in having a full-width engine-bonnet concealing the radiator. At the time, following the press attention to couturier Christian Dior, such a structure – also used by Foden on its bus chassis from 1946 – was called a "new look" front; tradition-minded enthusiasts for buses more derisively dubbed such a structure the tin front. Leyland's design for the Midland Red order was not a slavish copy of the BMMO design but had clear family resemblance, notably having a rounded void at the top of the twelve vertically oriented ventilation slots for the radiator which gave space for the BMMO monogram. These were to be the only PD2/12s to be built with this new front, and also the only Leyland-bodied Titans fitted from new with such a feature.

There were two facts which accounted for this. Firstly, when Leyland decided to offer the tin front on general sale from 1953, it did so with a new set of variant suffixes; and also in 1953, with effect by 1954, to the chagrin of many customers, Leyland decided to close its coachworks. Two reasons for Leyland's decision are adduced: firstly that coachbuilders (and not just in Farington) were prone to take industrial action with alacrity, so the closure was to set an example to the rest of Leyland Motors' workforce, and secondly that Leyland needed the space to mass-produce lorry cabs with semi-skilled labour. Neither reason contradicts the other, but customers felt the lack of the Leyland body and outside coachbuilders, notably the Metro Cammell Weymann consortium, felt the benefit as their lightweight Orion body was introduced during 1953, capturing the mood of the time. The initial range of Titans fitted with the full-width bonnet were as follows:

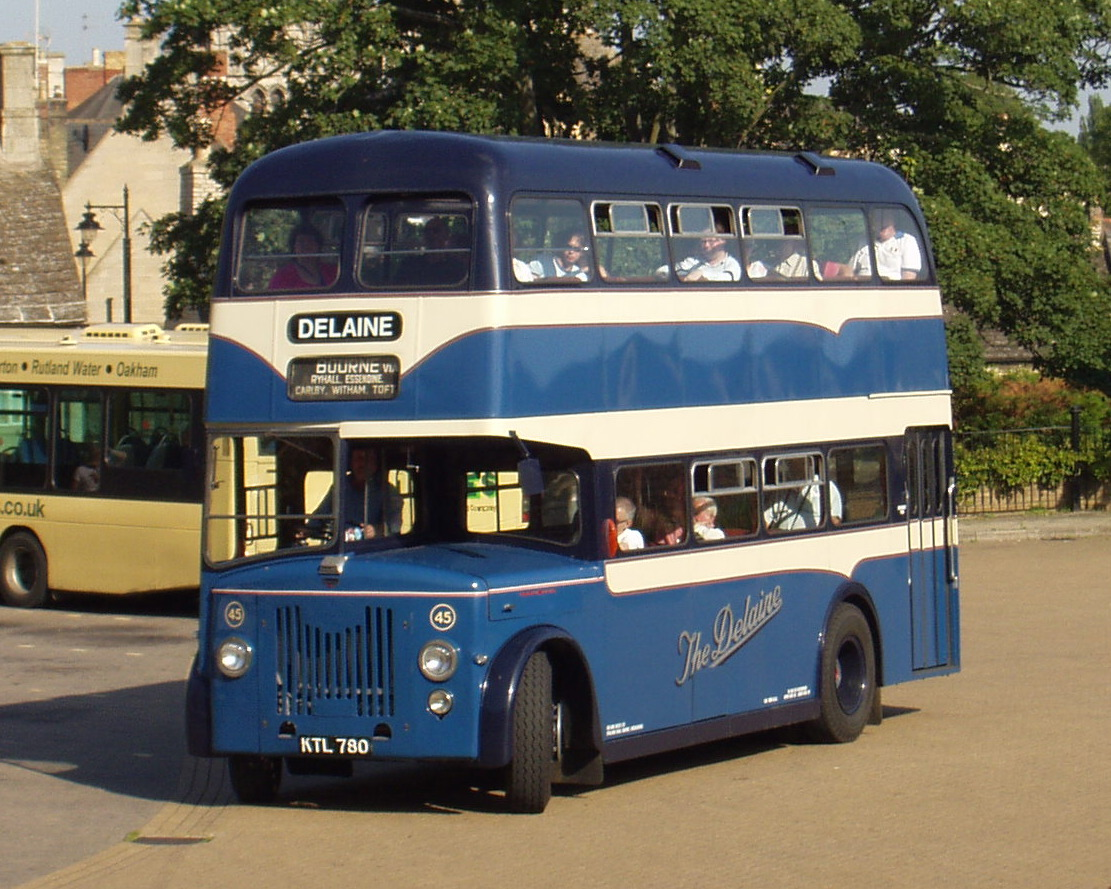
KTL780 a Delaine Buses Titan PD2/20 with "tin front" and Willowbrook body

- PD2/20: Synchromesh, vacuum brakes, 8 ft (2.4 m) wide.
- PD2/21: Synchromesh, air brakes, 8 ft (2.4 m) wide.
- PD2/22: Synchromesh, vacuum brakes, 7 ft 6 in (2.29 m) wide.
- PD2/23: Synchromesh, air brakes, 7 ft 6 in (2.29 m) wide.

It is notable that Leyland's two 1953 Titan demonstrators with manual gearboxes were both coded PD2/20 although the first, all-Leyland STC887, carried an exposed radiator, so perhaps should have been coded PD2/12. UTF930 on the other hand had both the tin front and the Orion Body; both were successful on their demonstration tours and later operated for a further 15 years with first Scout Motor Services of Preston and then Yorkshire Woollen District Traction Company of Dewsbury.

The biggest order for the PD2/20, which was the biggest seller of the range, was from Edinburgh Corporation Transport, which took 300 with Orion bodies, to replace the city's trams. An Edinburgh Corporation Baillie (an honorary title for a senior councillor, roughly equivalent to an Alderman in England) famously described them unfavourably in the Edinburgh council chambers in the following paragraph of ringing rhetoric:

"They are ungainly, inelegant, monstrous masses of shivering tin. They are modern to the extent of being able to produce a perfect synchronisation of rock n’ roll."

That said they outlasted the contemporary Alexander-bodied Guy Arab IVs delivered in smaller quantities and some ran over 20 years in service, with the late survivors running for Lothian Regional Transport. Leyland used ECT fuel returns in the late 1950s in its advertising; "Scots find them thrifty" was the headline over a greyscale plate of one, beside a large balloon caption which read "9.75 MPG! in daily service." They so much became fleet standard that the tin front was replicated in glass reinforced plastic by ECT and fitted to Guy Arab II and Daimler CV chassis, as well as a preceding batch of all-Leyland PD2/12s, even extending its use to ancillary vehicles such as gritting lorries converted from Arab III single-deckers. When Leyland switched to a revised frontal appearance in 1960–61 (see below) Edinburgh stuck to their home-built version of the BMMO outline, fitting the City crest where the BMMO monogram had gone on their batch. Thus later Edinburgh Titans are sometimes quoted in Leyland codes as having exposed radiators, a similar confusion attached to full-fronted Titans for a variety of operators.

Another large customer for the PD2/20 was Liverpool Corporation Transport Department which took 100 each over 1955–56 with Duple and Alexander bodies. It was also popular with the Scottish Bus Group, which dual-sourced, taking lowbridge Titans with Alexander, Northern Counties and Park Royal bodies at the same time as taking Bristol-ECW LD6G Lodekkas. The only SBG subsidiary not to take lowbridge PD2/20s was cash-strapped Highland Omnibuses, which did not purchase a new double-decker until 1979. The most unusual coachbuilder on the PD2/20 was for Sheffield Transport, which added five with Eastern Coach Works bodies in 1957. ECW bodies, like Bristol Chassis, were at the time restricted to wholly state-owned operators. Sheffield Transport, although managed by Sheffield Corporation, had three components: the wholly municipal A fleet; the half municipal, half British Railways-owned B-fleet, and the wholly British Railways owned C-fleet; it was for this unit that these five were built, with similar H32/28R bodies to the Bristol KSW buses of similar layout and dimensions used by BTC fleets.

Major PD2/21 customers included East Midland Motor Services and The North-Western Road Car Company. Blackpool took five in 1957, fitting them with rear-entrance H. V. Burlingham bodies with full-width fronts but open rear-platform entrances.

Customers for the narrower PD2/22 version included Jersey Motor Transport, West Riding Automobile Company and the corporations of Darwen, Great Yarmouth, Luton and St Helens. The full-width front for the narrower chassis was made from standard components, the major difference being that the mudguards to the front wing assembly were narrower. Narrow double-deckers with air-brakes were very much a minority taste.

Having had a good reception at home and overseas for demonstrators with the Pneumocyclic gearbox – which built on the previous pre-selective epicyclic design by being of direct-acting semi-automatic engagement, thus removing the need for a change-speed pedal, and being adapted for fully automatic control, although, being air-pressure operated, it required an air-pressure braking system – Leyland launched four further variants to the tin-front Titan in 1954, two of which were specifically designed to suit the contemporary vogue for lightweight construction (all were air-braked):

- PD2/24: Normal weight, Pneumocyclic, 8 ft (2.4 m) wide.
- PD2/25: Normal weight, Pneumocyclic, 7 ft 6 in (2.29 m) wide.
- PD2/26: Lightweight, Pneumocyclic, 8 ft (2.4 m) wide.
- PD2/27: Lightweight, Synchromesh, 8 ft (2.4 m) wide.

Early rewards were substantial orders for Glasgow Corporation Transport, which was beginning the programme to replace its extensive tramway system, the much-loved "caurs". Glasgow had from 1951 standardised on epicyclic transmission and saw the Pneumocyclic as a significant advance. The first order, in 1955/6, consisted of 25 PD2/25s, which like contemporary AEC Regent Vs and Daimler CVG6s had Alexander bodies to Weymann outline. 300 PD2/24s followed between 1958 and 1961, 225 of which had Alexander bodies, the other 75 being built by GCT themselves to Alexander design at its Coplawhill car works, previously the centre of Glasgow tram overhaul.

Some Pneumocyclic Titans had a centrifugal clutch instead of a fluid-coupling to the transmission; this was apparently standard on the PD2/26, of which none are recorded as built. Blackpool took the PD2/27 in 1957–58 with full-fronted MCW Orion bodies.

A further series of codes were raised late in 1954, presumably to extend lightweight features to the rest of the range. They were all synchromesh, but Leyland had as standard removed synchromesh engagement from second gear, this only available as an option, due to excessive wear, which Leyland credited to driver-abuse. Halifax continued to specify synchromesh on second gear, presumably at higher cost:

- PD2/28: 7 ft 6 in (2.29 m) wide, air-brakes
- PD2/30: 8 ft (2.4 m) wide, vacuum brakes
- PD2/31: 7 ft 6 in (2.29 m) wide, vacuum brakes

Like the uncatalogued PD2/29, no PD2/28s were built, most of the customers for the PD2/21 continuing with the PD2/31; familiar suspects included Luton, Lincoln, Darwen and Jersey Motor Transport. The largest customer for the PD2/30 was Central SMT, which took 55 between 1957 and 1960 with 59-seat lowbridge bodies built by Alexander (40) and Northern Counties (15).

The previous exposed radiator range still attracted profitable custom and unlike Daimler (which built its last exposed-radiator CVG6 in 1953), Guy (last exposed-radiator Arab IV in 1959) and AEC (last exposed-radiator Regent V in 1960), Leyland continued to offer this option until the end of UK Titan production. So in late 1955 the type-codes were rationalised to include both frontal designs:

Width/bonnet	Pneumocyclic	Manual, air brakes	Manual, vacuum brakes
8' enclosed radiator	PD2/24	PD2/27	PD2/30
8' exposed radiator	PD2/34	PD2/37	PD2/40
7 ft 6 in (2.29 m) enclosed radiator	PD2/25	PD2/28	PD2/31
7 ft 6 in (2.29 m) exposed radiator	PD2/35	PD2/38	PD2/41

=== Later OPD2s ===
Further OPD2 variants were added by 1954/5, retaining 17 ft 6 in (5.33 m) wheelbases for 27 ft 6 in (8.38 m) bodies, 8 ft (2.4 m) width and air brakes. These were:

- OPD2/6: Synchromesh, enclosed radiator
- OPD2/7: Pneumocyclic, enclosed radiator
- OPD2/9: Pneumocyclic, exposed radiator
- OPD2/10: Synchromesh, exposed radiator

Again, CIÉ was the biggest customer, taking 234 OPD2/10s and three experimental fully automatic OPD2/9s between 1955 and 1958, all with their own style of bodywork. CIÉ also took six special order OPD2/1 chassis to 7 ft 6 in (2.29 m) width in 1954, on which they fitted the bodies from non-standard Daimler CWD6s built in 1946.

Over 500 went to India in the first two years of production. Notable among these were large batches of OPD2/9s for Bombay Electric Supply and Transport Company, previously a Daimler user, and subsequently standardised on Titans to this day.

Other customers included United Transport, Kenya (105), Madrid Corporation (50), and the Cape Tramways Group (28), while other territories included Sierra Leone.

=== PD3 ===
British construction and use regulations were further relaxed in July 1956, with the maximum double-deck length on two axles being increased to 30 ft (9.1 m) and gross vehicle weight to 14 tons. Leyland immediately responded to these relaxed regulations by announcing a new six-model range of Titans with 18 ft 3 in (5.56 m) wheelbases, all for 8 ft (2.4 m) wide bodies.

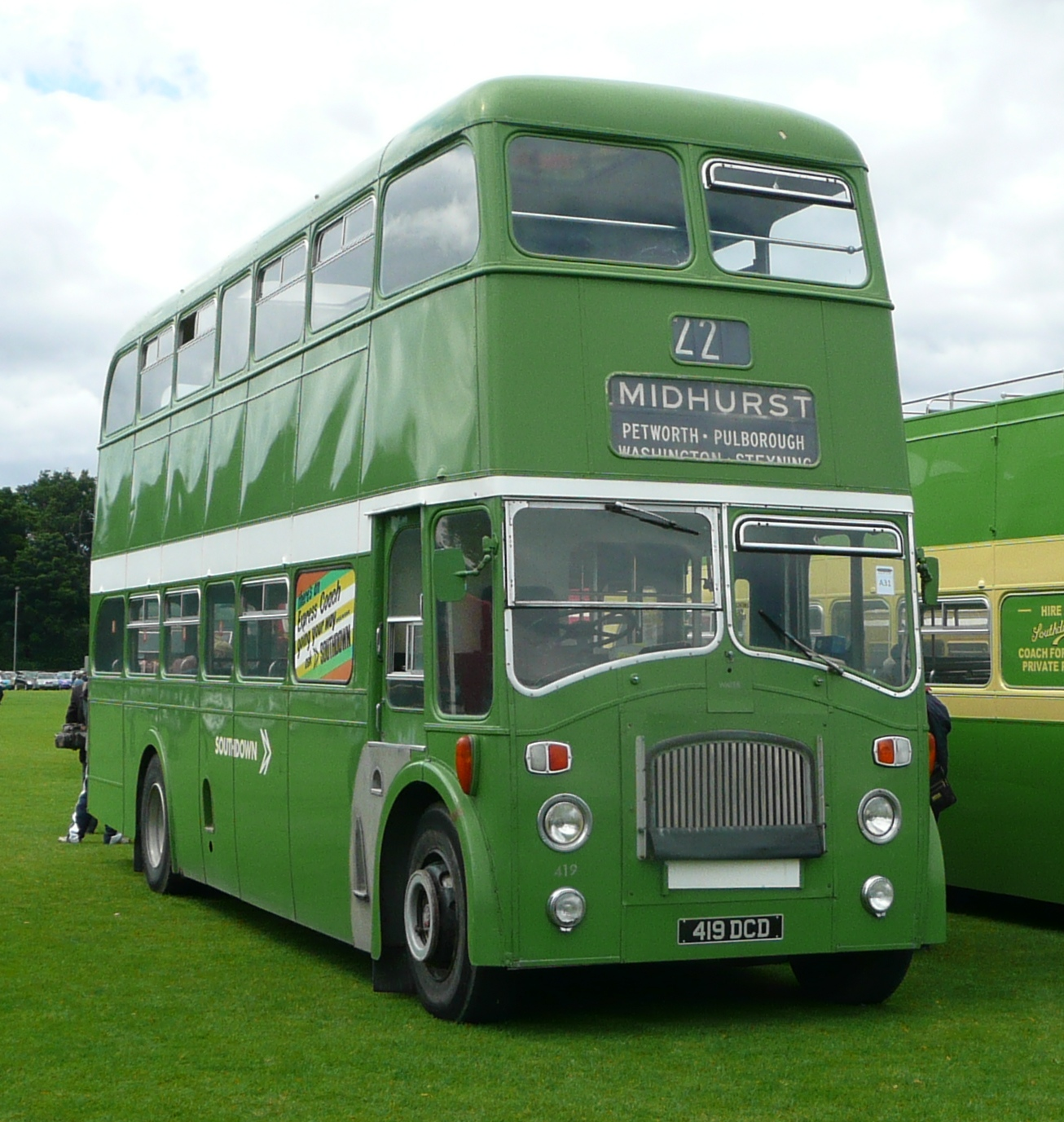
A Northern Counties-bodied Leyland Titan PD3/4, Southdown Motor Services fleet number 419

These six models commenced the PD3 variant.

- PD3/1: Synchromesh, air brakes, full-width bonnet
- PD3/2: Pneumocyclic, air brakes, full-width bonnet
- PD3/3: Synchromesh, vacuum brakes, full-width bonnet
- PD3/4: Synchromesh, air brakes, exposed radiator
- PD3/5: Pneumocyclic, air brakes, exposed radiator
- PD3/6: Synchromesh, vacuum brakes, exposed radiator

There was never an OPD3, as the thicker steel for the framing and the larger worm-wheel for the rear axle were standard in the PD3, which was offered for export as well as the home market. Leyland exhibited the first completed example at the 1956 Commercial Motor Show. This had an MCW Orion body but, although shown with 74 seats, it was reduced to a 68-seat layout before delivery to Potteries Motor Traction, which registered it 700AEH. It was a major constituent of the British Electric Traction Group's new order programme for 1957, and was also ordered by Central and Western SMT and W. Alexander, all dual-sourcing with Lodekkas. Western and Alexander took batches with 67-seat lowbridge bodies until 1961, while Central reverted to the 59-seater PD2 during the same period.

Municipal operators included Glasgow and Edinburgh, Glasgow taking 140 PD3/2s in 1961/62. Of these, the first 25 were bodied by Glasgow itself to Alexander design. These buses carried Albion saltire shields on their Leyland badges as a public relations exercise.

A number of independents also took the PD3 and the Ulster Transport Authority took examples with fully fronted MCW bodies finished by the operator. Some of these on PD3/5 chassis had the newly optional O.680 11.1-litre 150 bhp engine and a luggage boot, for use on Belfast Airport services; some of the PD3/4s for rural routes also had a rear luggage boot, while the PD3/4s allocated to Derry City had the first instance of power-assisted steering on a Leyland double-decker.

Larger customers for full-front Titans were Ribble Motor Services and Southdown Motor Services within BET, both of which took a mixture of PD3/4 and PD3/5 over 1957–63 and 1957–67 respectively. Southdown Motor Services had the largest fleet of PD3's within the BET group at 285 examples. The O.680 was only available on Pneumocyclic Titans, the last customer being Leicester City Transport.

Initially the best export customer was CIÉ, which took 152 PD3/2s between 1959 and 1961 to form the 74-seat operator-bodied RA class.

=== Later developments ===
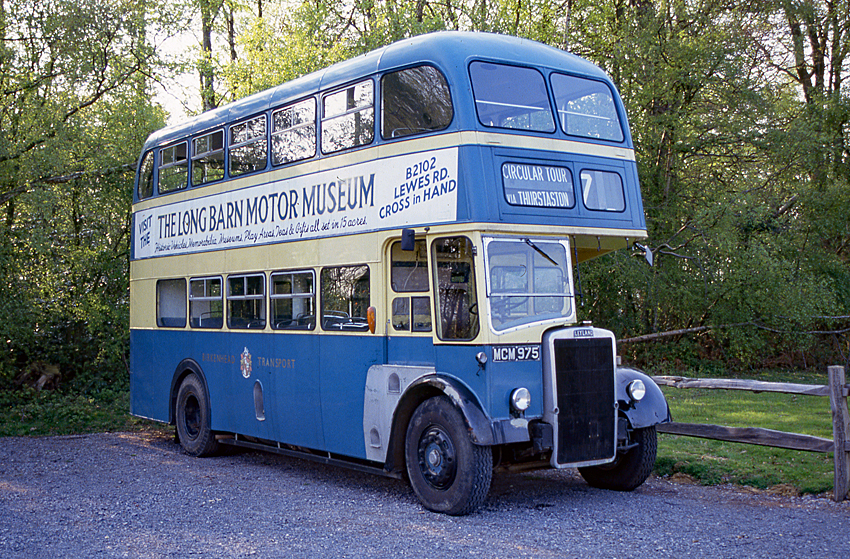
Leyland Titan PD2/40 Massey of Birkenhead Transport

In 1962 Leyland de-listed the narrow PD2 versions, although 12 (described as special PD2/40) were completed for Warrington in 1965. In contrast during 1963 Ribble took its last Titans with MCW bodies to the newly authorised width of 8 ft (2.4 m) 2 1/2 in. Two vacuum-braked Titans remained listed, the PD2A/30 and the PD2/40, but with SBG switching to a new air-braked Leyland-Albion double-decker, the vacuum-braked PD3A/3 was discontinued. During 1960 a new full-width bonnet was introduced, made of glass-reinforced plastic and with a sculpted nearside edge to improve kerb visibility for the driver; this became known as the "St Helen's Front" after its first customer. The front grille was similar to Leyland and Albion lorries of the time with the Motor Panels LAD cab. When this front was fitted an A was added to the type number, e.g. PD2A/28 or PD3A/2.

Glasgow's last Titan was its only PD3A; it was shown at the 1961 Scottish Motor Show, alongside the low-height derivative of the Titan designed for the Scottish Bus Group, the Lowlander. This was designed at Albion but production versions were assembled in Glasgow from CKD kits supplied by Leyland; it used the front-end structure of the PD3A almost unmodified but had a complex swept-down frame allowing a step-less forward entry. Three variants were built of four offered, all being air braked, and most had the GRP front. The exceptions were two full-fronted batches built for Ribble. In general those sold to SBG were badged Albion, and those sold in England were badged Leyland. Advances (on the Lowlander only) were an uprated "power-plus" O.600 developing 140 bhp and a dual-circuit braking system. Air suspension was optional on the rear axle, which was of the drop-centre type. The last large order for vacuum-braked Titans was from Edinburgh, which took 50 PD3/6 in 1964; the following year all vacuum-braked Titans were discontinued.

Export sales continued unabated, Cape Tramways taking 185 PD3 with Pneumocyclic gearboxes in 1964/5. Kenya and Sierra Leone continued to take Titans; a final range of revisions to the range, in 1967, brought many components into line with the now larger-selling Atlantean; the main changes were a move to dual-circuit air brakes and the adoption of the rationalised Pneumocyclic gearbox to semi-automatic Titans. This resulted in a change of nomenclature with A now denoting the new gearbox, regardless of front-end appearance.

- PD2A/44: Short, Pneumocyclic, plastic front
- PD2/47: Short, Synchromesh, plastic front
- PD2A/54: Short, Pneumocyclic, traditional radiator
- PD2/57: Short, Synchromesh, traditional radiator
- PD3/11: Long, Synchromesh, plastic front
- PD3A/12: Long, Pneumocyclic, Plastic front
- PD3/14: Long, Synchromesh, traditional radiator
- PD3A/15: Long, Pneumocyclic, traditional radiator

The final export territory was Indonesia which took a solitary PD3/11;' the last Titan delivered to the UK was an East Lancs-bodied PD3/14 ordered by Ramsbottom Corporation and delivered to SELNEC PTE in November 1969, registered TTD 386H.

In 1969 the line was moved to Ashok Leyland for continued production using Ashok Leyland running units: a link to the current Ashok Leyland specification sheet is included below.

== Titans in London ==
When London Transport was established in 1933 it inherited about three hundred TD1 and TD2 Leyland Titans from independent bus operators in London and the home counties, which they classed TD. It also commissioned a batch of 100 TD4s bodied by Leyland with the standard Leyland steel framed body of the time modified to LPTB requirements (to look like the existing STL class) in 1936 (STD1-100), to evaluate against the board's standard AEC Regent double-decks (STL-class) most of which had hardwood-framed bodies built by LPTB. STD91-100 were TD4c with torque-converter transmission as built, but, on first overhaul, were converted to standard Leyland manual gearboxes.

In 1941, LPTB were allocated ten 'unfrozen' TD7 Titans (STD 101-11), which received early Ministry of Supply Utility Style bodies by Park Royal Vehicles. Burdened with heavy flywheels and slow gearchanges, rather than allocate them to Country Area routes, they were allocated to Central London routes, which made them unpopular with drivers, who eventually refused to drive them. The London Fire Brigade, and some other Fire Brigades, as well as the National Fire Service, also had Titan TD7s fitted with turntable ladders (see above).

After World War II, a batch of 65 standard Leyland-bodied PD1s were delivered, as a stop-gap measure, until RT-type buses could be delivered in quantity, these arriving in 1946 and being numbered STD 112-76.

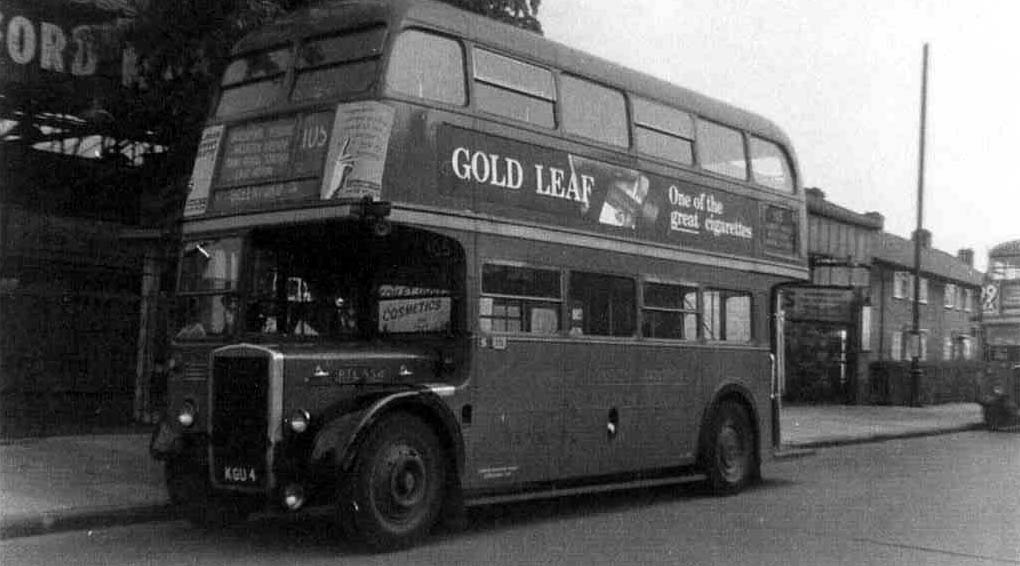
London Transport's RTL554 when in service, 1949

As part of the RT programme, (see above), London Transport bought 2,131 Leyland Titans, specifically designed for use in London. They were designated as the RTL (1,631 built) and the wider variant RTW (500 built). In appearance, they were very similar to the AEC-built RTs (4,825 built), the radiator shell being the most obvious difference (aside from the greater width of the RTWs). The RTLs carried Weymann, Metro-Cammell and Park Royal hardwood-framed bodies identical to those on RTs, whilst the RTWs carried Leyland's steel-framed bodies The bodies were all jig-built, to enable easy transfer between chassis.

In 1963/64, London Transport purchased two batches of service tenders for the London Underground, based on Leyland Titan PD3A/2 chassis; these carrying crew-cabs by Sparshatt of Portsmouth and van bodies by Mann Egerton of Norwich, the first batch being registered 571-5 EYU and the second ALM841-3B. These were the last front-engined Leyland Titans bought new by London Transport. London Coaches, then a wholly owned subsidiary, purchased an East Lancashire bodied PD3 and a Metro-Cammell-bodied PD2 in the late 1980s for driver training and some others were used by private operators on tourist services in London in the 1970s and 1980s.

In June 1953, RTL1459, along with AEC Regent III RT RT3710, was shipped to Switzerland and displayed at a trade fare in Zürich and a similar event in Malmö. During its visit, it operated services in Zürich, Geneva, Lucerne and St Gallen.

== Gallery ==
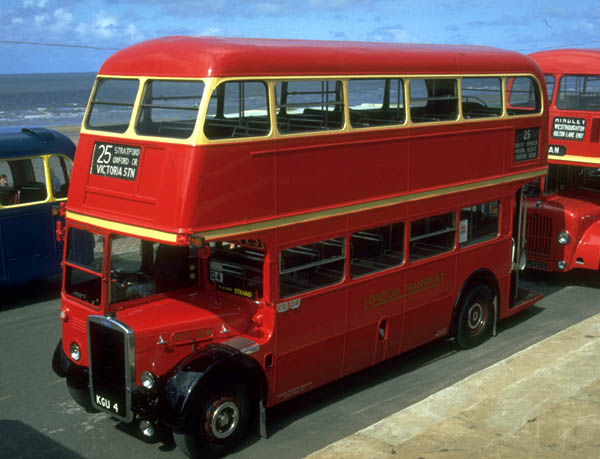
RTL554 again seen preserved in 1991.

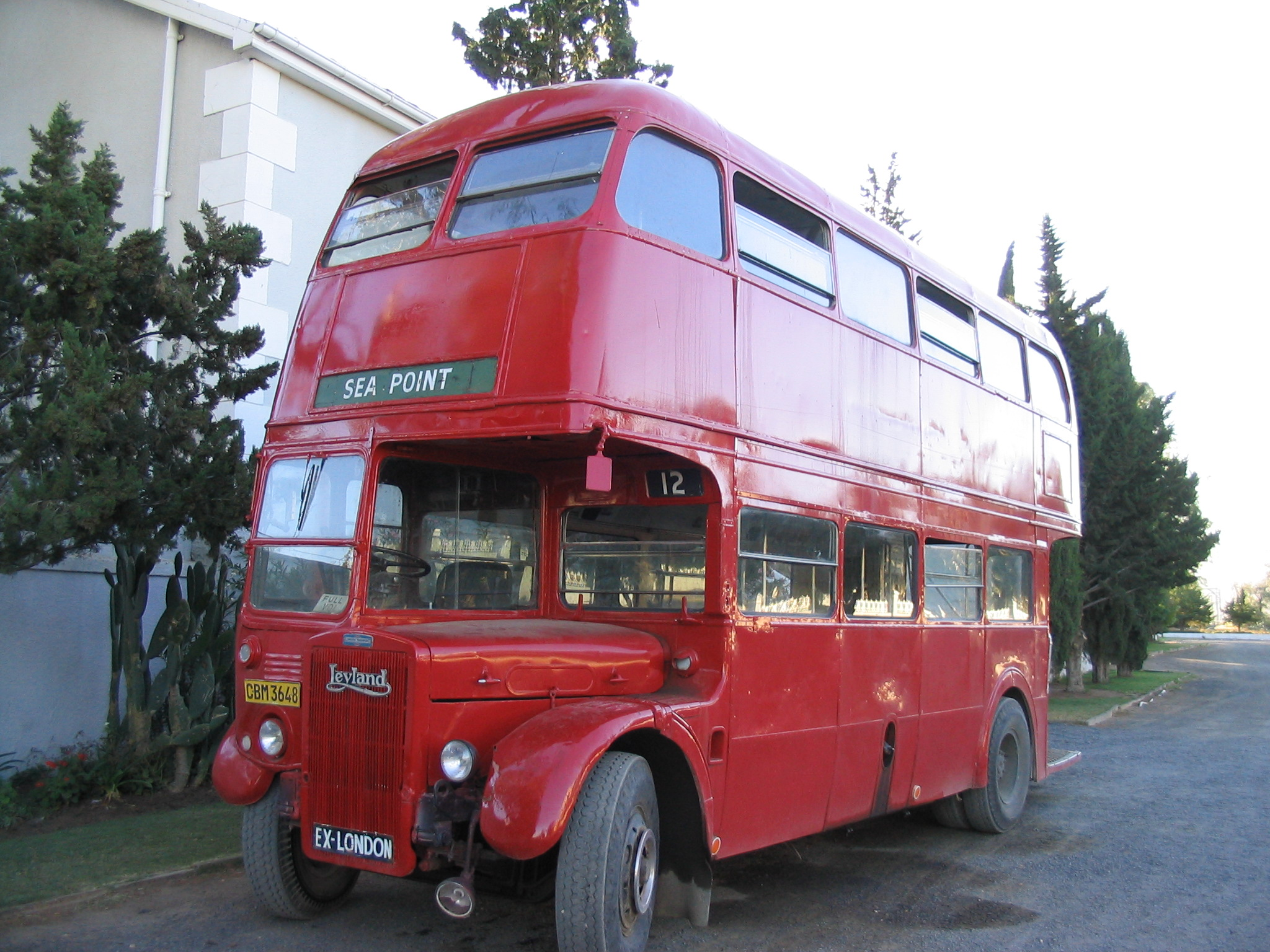
An RTL which has been exported to South Africa.

== See also ==
- Unitrans
