= AEC Regent III RT =

Double-decker bus variant of the AEC Regent III

- RT574 at Victoria on route 185 in 1974

Overview
- Manufacturer: AEC
- Production: 1939–1942; 1945–1954
- Assembly: Southall, England

Body and chassis
- Doors: 1 door
- Floor type: Step entrance
- Related: AEC Regent III

Powertrain
- Engine: AEC

Dimensions
- Length: 26 ft (7.92 m)
- Width: 7 ft 6 in (2.29 m)
- Height: 14 ft 5 1/4 in (4.4 m)

Chronology
- Successor: AEC Routemaster

The AEC Regent III RT was one of the variants of the AEC Regent III. It was a double-decker bus produced jointly between AEC and London Transport. It was the standard red London bus in the 1950s and continued to outnumber the better-known AEC Routemaster throughout the 1960s.

== Prototype ==
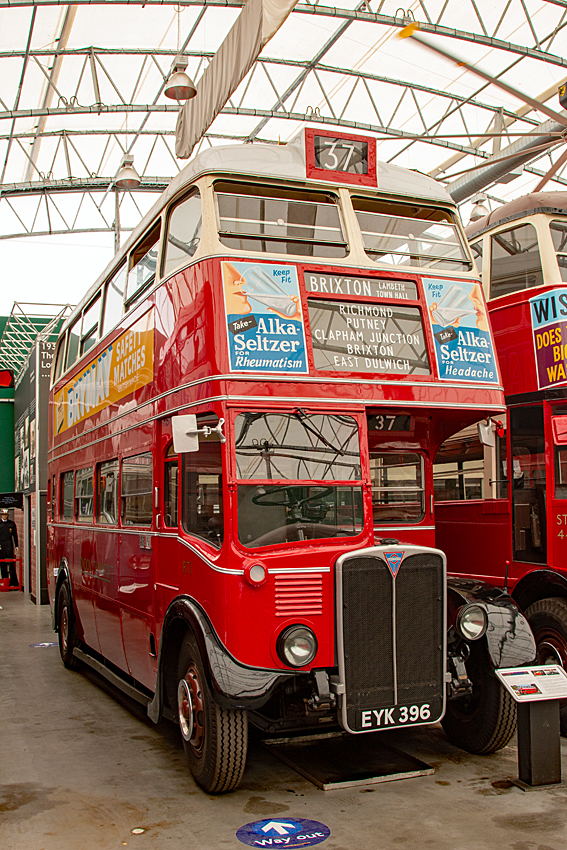
RT1, AEC Regent III prototype at the London Bus Museum

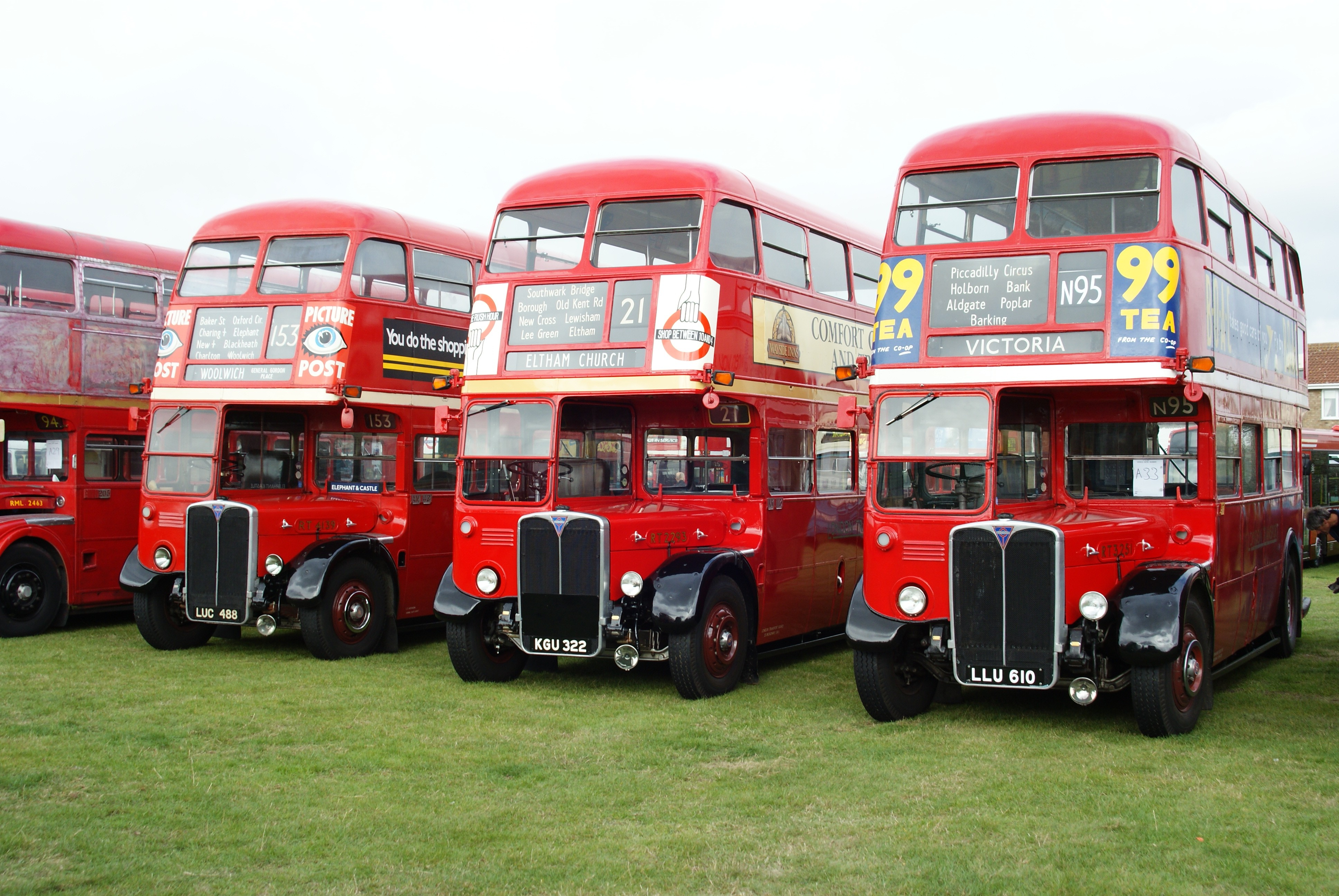
Three preserved RTs in 2009

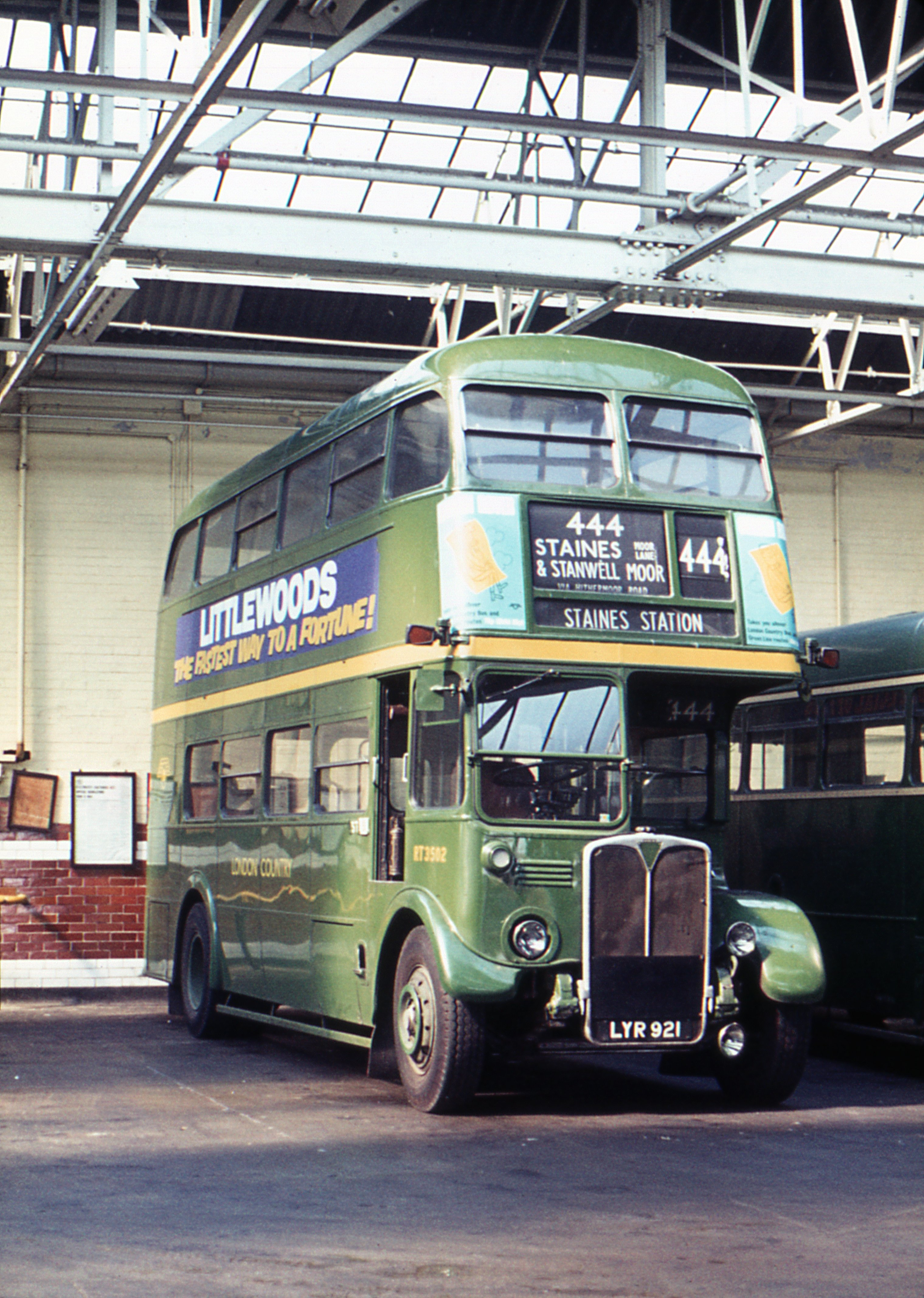
London Country Bus Services RT in 1972

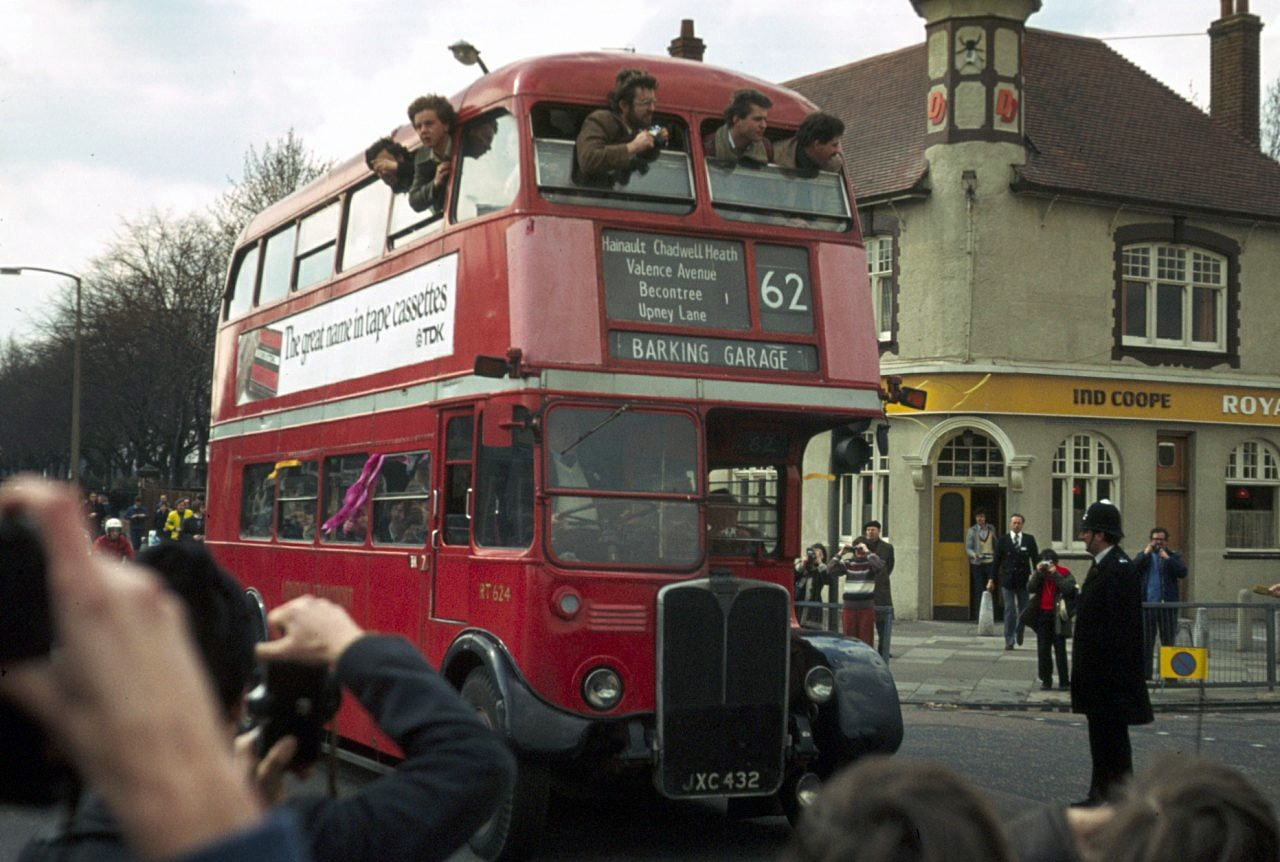
The last RT bus in regular service in Barking on 7 April 1979

The prototype (London Transport RT 1) was built in 1938 with an AEC 8.8-litre (540 cu in) engine (a stopgap measure until the new 9.6-litre (590 cu in) was available) and air-operated pre-selective gearbox. Finding a satisfactory British substitute for the German air compressor, bought from Bosch, was to cause problems for AEC once war broke out. A prototype chassis was placed into service, disguised as an old vehicle. It carried a secondhand open-staircase body previously carried on Leyland Titan (fleet number TD 111), dating from 1931. Thus bodied, RT 1 entered service in July 1938 as ST 1140, even though it was nothing like a standard ST vehicle. It continued in service until December 1938.

While the chassis was on trial, a new body was constructed at London Transport's Chiswick Works. Its four-bay body resembled that of the Roe Leeds City Pullman body exhibited at the 1937 Commercial Motor Show, though the overall impression of modern design and the features included marked a big step forward. This body replaced the old one on RT 1 and the bus re-entered service in 1939.

== Pre-war ==
London Transport ordered 338 (later reduced to 150) chassis, which were in production when World War II broke out in September 1939. However, with the Fall of France in June 1940, delivery slowed progressively. The last of the batch, RT 151, did not reach London Transport until January 1942, six months after its predecessor, although all were built to full pre-war specification. These vehicles were lighter in weight than RT1 and their postwar counterparts, as the others had metal-framed bodies rather than composite wood/metal ones.

The only other RT-type chassis constructed before the end of the war was destined for and went to Glasgow Corporation. Details of it are: AEC Regent IIIRT/Weymann H30/26R body (Fleet No. 723, Registration No. DGB371) It was originally intended to be an exhibit at the 1939 Commercial Motor Show, but this was cancelled, due to the outbreak of war. It differed from the pre-war London examples in having a body built by Weymann, the front blind area being very much in the Cowieson-body style, Glasgow Corporation's usual body builder at the time, although the cab area/radiator was very similar to the London vehicles. It was delivered in February 1940 and sold out of service, to a dealer, in 1956.

== Post-war ==
Production of the RT recommenced in late 1946, being delayed by London Transport's desire to have the bodies jig-built, following its experience building Halifax bombers at Aldenham Tube Depot (later to become its main bus works). The new vehicles were built to a modified version of the pre-war London Transport design but were similar in appearance to their predecessors. The main visual differences were:

1. The ultimate (narrow) destination blind was now located just above the driver with the via blind (wide) between the ultimate and the top deck windows.
2. The front route number remained above the top deck windows (known by some as the lighthouse box...as well as the more widely used 'roofbox') although the rear one was removed and the route number joined the "via" points in the main display.
3. The bodywork was constructed by several contractors, rather than by London Transport.
4. The lower edge of the cab window forward of the driver's door and the lower edge of the driver's windscreen were horizontal, whereas on pre-war examples they curved downwards towards the corner of the cab. Also, the lower offside bodyside, behind the rear wheel, did not curve in, as it did ahead of the rear wheel.
5. The number of ventilation slats below the windscreen was reduced from 6 to 4.

In total, London Transport received 4,674 post-war RT-class buses between 1947 and 1954, with a small number of similar buses also going to operators outside London (see below).

However, the London "RT" family of vehicles could be considered to have numbered 6,956 in total, consisting of 4,825 RTs; 1,631 RTLs and 500 RTWs. The latter two types had a variant of the Leyland Titan chassis and, also, the RTWs had Leyland 8 feet wide steel-framed bodies (as opposed to 7 feet 6 inches). The whole family were never all in operation at the same time. In addition, some surplus bodies were, for a short time, put onto modified STL chassis and classed as SRTs.

The very last RT in service (RT624), now preserved by Ensignbus, operated on route 62 from Barking Garage on 7 April 1979.

Like the pre-war Glasgow vehicle, not all post-war production went to London Transport. Between 1946 and 1951, 101 chassis were delivered to ten other operators. Of these, only forty had RT-style bodies, thirty nine, by Park Royal, for St Helens' Corporation and one, by Metro-Cammell, for Coventry Corporation Transport. The external link below has more information.

In June 1953, RT3710, along with Leyland Titan RTL1459, was shipped to Switzerland and displayed at a trade fair in Zurich and a similar event in Malmö. During its visit it operated services in Zurich, Geneva, Lucerne and St Gallen.

In 1967, the University of California, Davis purchased two London Transport buses for the Unitrans system. Beginning with that initial purchase of two busses for their "East" and "West" perimeter routes, service began in February 1968. Unitrans eventually imported three additional busses for a total of 5 busses by 1974. Today, the system still maintains three of the original double decker busses, RT4735, RT2819, and RT742. RTL1014, one of the original two purchased, was returned to London when retired and is held by Ensignbus in their Transport Museum

== Media appearances ==
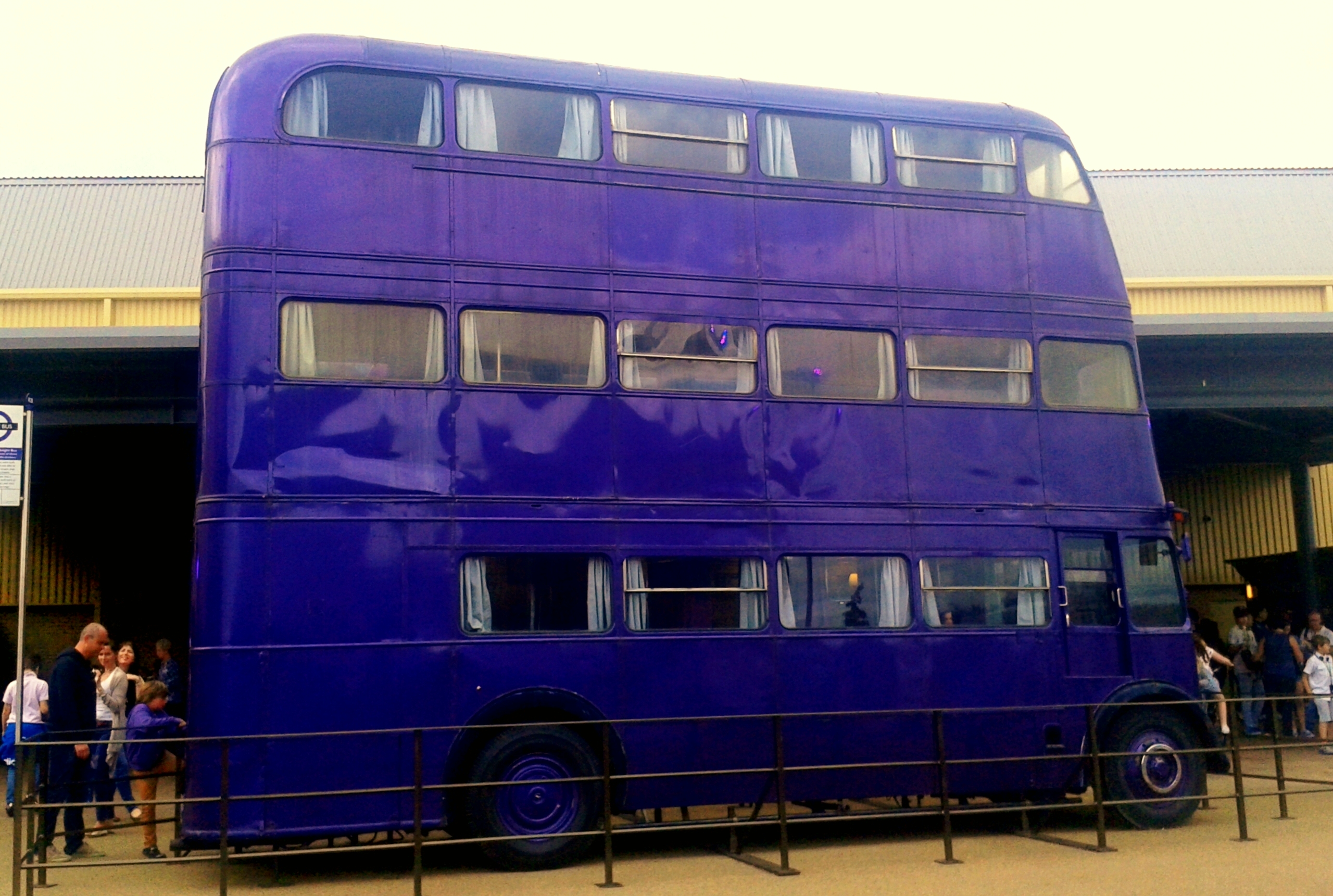
Knight Bus from Harry Potter and the Prisoner of Azkaban at Warner Bros. Studios Leavesden in 2013

In the 1963 British musical comedy film, Summer Holiday, Cliff Richard drives a converted RT bus to Athens. In April 1962 Associated British Picture Corporation of Elstree actually bought three used RTs (RT2305 (KGU334), RT2366 (KGU395), and RT4326 (NLE990)) from London Transport. They were all converted to look like RT1881 (with a fake registration number: WLB991) for filming different segments.

In the 1973 James Bond film Live and Let Die, Bond commandeers an RT III during an escape. Stunts involving the bus included a 360-degree spin, and slicing the top deck off on a low bridge to stop the pursuers.

An AEC Regent can be seen in the music video for the Madness single "Cardiac Arrest" released in 1982.

An AEC Regent III, as a 1950 version, makes its appearance in the 2001 film The Mummy Returns (even though the film was set in 1933).

In 2003 three RT buses (RT2240, RT3882, and RT4497) were rebuilt into two triple-decker vehicles (one as a back-up during filming) (known as the Knight Bus) for the Harry Potter film Harry Potter and the Prisoner of Azkaban.
