= Longwell Green Coachworks =

British vehicle manufacturer

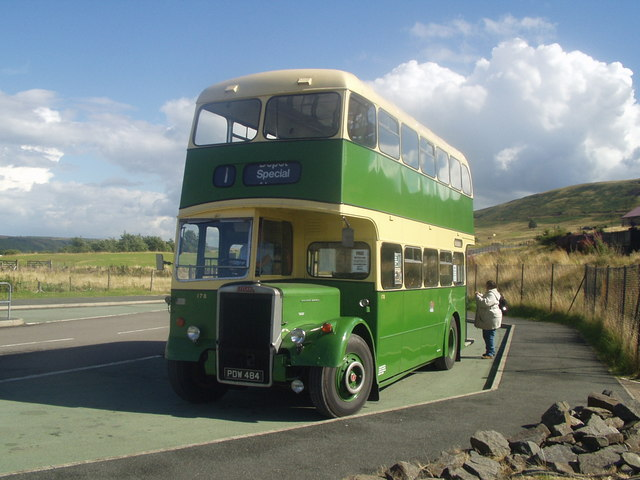
- Newport Transport's vintage Leyland Titan bus with Longwell Green bodywork
- Formerly: W. J. Bence & Sons
- Company type: Limited company
- Industry: Vehicle manufacturing
- Founded: 1919
- Founder: W. J. Bence
- Headquarters: Longwell Green, Bristol, England
- Products: Buses, lorries, vans

Longwell Green Coachworks, formerly W. J. Bence & Sons and then Bence Motor Bodies Ltd, was a vehicle manufacturer based in Longwell Green, Bristol, England. It built the bodies of buses, coaches, vans and lorries on chassis supplied by other manufacturers. The company was in business from 1919 until 1983.

== W.J. Bence (1891–1944) ==
William J. Bence, a wheelwright, started a horse-drawn carriage business in 1891, connected many of the outlying villages with Bristol. He transported goods and was also glad to take passengers, particularly on market days. Bence moved into several other lines of business, including being an agent for chassis manufacturers such as Ford.

In 1919 Bence began a motor bus service from his base in Longwell Green. He began to build bus bodies on the chassis for his own service and for other bus operators. The chassis had been designed for military vehicles from World War I (1914–18). In 1922 Bence Motor Services was running 14-seat buses on a Ford Model T chassis. The W. J. Bence & Sons coachworks also built delivery vans. The company made Public Service Vehicles (PSVs) throughout the 1930s.

At the start of World War II (1939–45) Bence was asked to make vehicle bodies for the military, and the company was renamed Bence Motor Bodies Ltd. In 1941 W. J. Bence was the only firm willing to undertake conversion of a second-hand 50 hp Daimler car into an ambulance for city of Bath, at a cost of £325.

== Longwell Green Coachworks (1944–83) ==
About 1944 the company was renamed Longwell Green Coachworks Ltd. By 1946 the company was offering bus, coach and commercial bodies. Coach bodies were built on chassis from Daimler and Maudslay, and 29- and 33-seat buses were built on the Leyland Comet chassis. The company built double-decker buses for the Bristol Omnibus Company on the Leyland Titan PD1 chassis. Longwell Green sold many bus bodies on chassis with underfloor engines to South Wales operators in the 1950s. For example, in 1957 Longwell Green supplied four single-deck motorbuses with Leyland Tiger Cub chassis to Cardiff Corporation. Between 1952 and 1957 Longwell Green was among the companies that built bodies for high-capacity Bedford pumping vehicles known as "Green Goddesses" for use by the Auxiliary Fire Service.

In 1960 the New Scientist reported that Longwell Green Coachworks had moulded a crane machinery house from Beetle polyester resin, the first time a complete crane machinery house had been made with structural plastics. The result was an elegant crane with reduced cost of construction. In May 1965 the plastics operation became L.G. Plastics.

Longwell Green Sports F.C., a football club, was formed in 1966 by workers from Longwell Green Coachworks during a period of great enthusiasm for football after England had beaten West Germany in the World Cup at Wembley. At the time Longwell Green Coachworks was the main employer in the area. The first pitch was laid out on what was then open farmland, and this is still the site of the team's home pitch.

Longwell Green Coachworks built both buses and lorries until 1966. Customers for the buses included the Cardiff, Newport, Aberdare, Gelligaer and Merthyr Tydfil corporations, and the larger Rhondda Transport Company and South Wales Transport. The lorries, vans and crew buses were bought by British Road Services, British Rail and the General Post Office. The last two buses were made in 1966, but the company went on building vans and lorries. In the 1980s the company made custom-built Range Rovers for use in the Middle East. Longwell Green Coachworks ceased operation in 1983.

== Sources ==
- Blake, Jim (30 August 2015), British Buses 1967, Pen and Sword, ISBN 978-1-4738-2717-2
- "c1922 Bence's Motor Services, Ford 'T' model 14-seat bus at Staple Hill terminus", djibnet
- Club History, LGSJFC: Longwell Green Sports Junor FC
- Craine, Simon; Ryan, Noel (2011), "Protection from the Cold": Cold War Protection in Preparedness for Nuclear War, Lulu.com, ISBN 978-1-904098-19-5
- Hill, Dennis (2003), Bath Fire Brigade and Ambulance Service, 1891–1974: An Illustrated History, Jeremy Mills Publishing, ISBN 978-0-948975-69-1
- History, Longwell Green Sports
- "Dockside crane", Design, 1968
- Jeroen (8 October 2014), J BENCE – LONGWELL GREEN Coachworks Ltd Bristol England UK 1890-1944-1966
- "News In Brief", Commercial Motor, 21 May 1965
- Reed Business Information (14 April 1960), New Scientist, Reed Business Information, ISSN 0262-4079
- Taylor, James (31 August 2013), A-Z of British Bus Bodies, Crowood, ISBN 978-1-84797-639-0
