= AEC Regent III =

British double-decker bus chassis

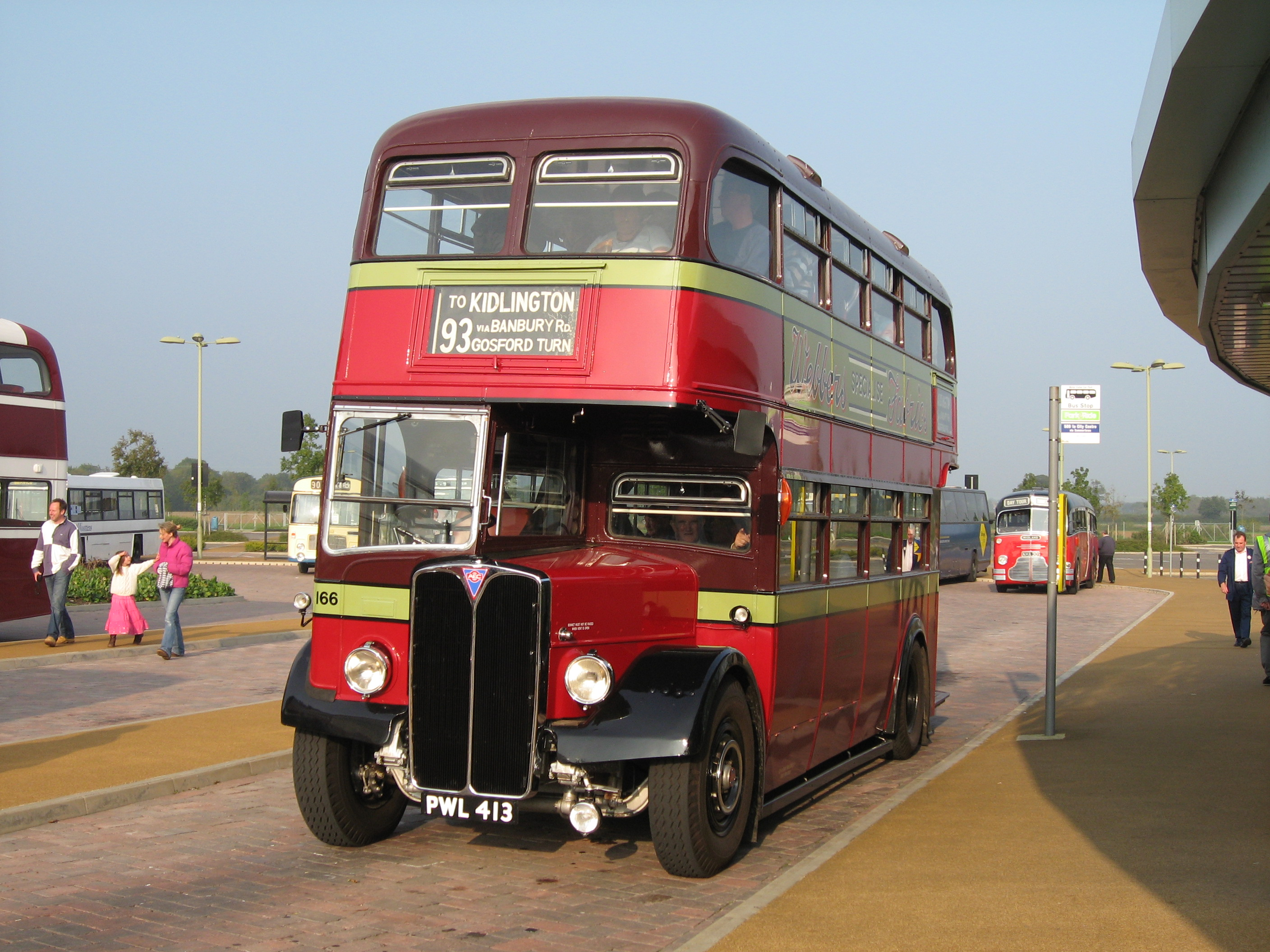
- City of Oxford Motor Services Regent III

Overview
- Manufacturer: AEC
- Production: 1950–1956
- Assembly: United Kingdom: Southall

Body and chassis
- Doors: 1 cab door, open platform at rear
- Floor type: Step entrance
- Related: AEC Regent III RT

Powertrain
- Engine: AEC

Dimensions
- Height: 13 ft 5 3/4 in (4.11 m)

Chronology
- Predecessor: AEC Regent II
- Successor: AEC Regent V

The AEC Regent III (also known as Regent 3 or Regent Mark III) is a type of double-decker bus chassis manufactured by AEC from 1950 to 1956.

== History ==
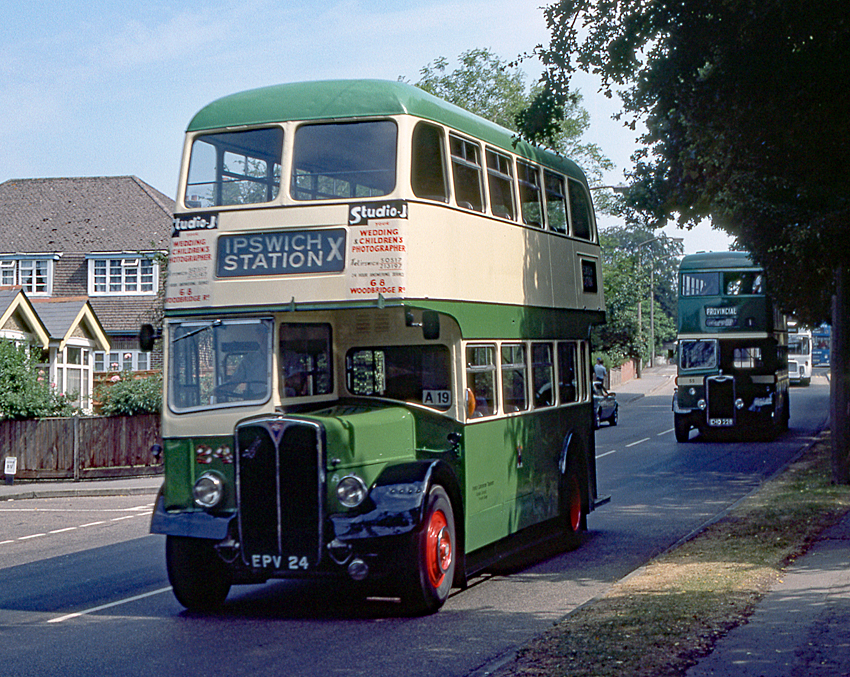
The last Regent III built, operated by Ipswich Corporation

The Regent III was mainly built for operation outside London and overseas. It could be fitted with AEC's 9.6-litre diesel engine (except a minority with 7.7-litre ones), 'Wilson' preselective epicyclic gearbox (except for a minority with crash gearboxes; a synchromesh option also became available in the early 1950s) and air-pressure operated brakes (except a minority with vacuum brakes). The Regent III was available with bodies from a number of manufacturers including Park Royal, Metro Cammell Weymann and Charles H. Roe.

AEC Regent III was superseded by the AEC Regent V, not the AEC Regent IV underfloor-engined double decker which existed as a one-off prototype only. The last Regent IIIs were supplied to Reading Corporation in 1956.

== Regent III in London ==
London Transport acquired 76 AEC Regent III buses with Weymann lowbridge bodywork. They were numbered as the RLH-class (Regent Low Height) and were used by London Transport from 1950 until 1971.

The first 20 RLHs were built in 1950 and were almost identical to 10 vehicles sold to Midland General who had originally ordered the vehicles. In 1952 a further batch of 56 buses was purchased which had minor differences. The fleet operated from various garages around both the Central area (painted red) and the Country area (painted green) of London Transport, usually where a low railway bridge over the road would otherwise cause a problem.

Many RLHs were sold for further use after London Transport. Due to their lower height of 13 feet 6 inches (4.11 m), about 1 foot (0.3 m) lower than standard double-decker buses, a significant number found their way to other countries especially in Europe and the USA where maximum vehicle height restrictions allowed them to operate.

== The RT-type ==
The AEC Regent III RT (RT-type) was first built in 1939 and was designed for and by London Transport. It was the standard red London bus during the 1950s, with a total of 4,825 buses built for London Transport. Although not all were in service at the same time.

Some RT-type buses were built for operation outside London, such as for St Helens Transport.
