= AEC Regent II =

British front-engined double-decker bus

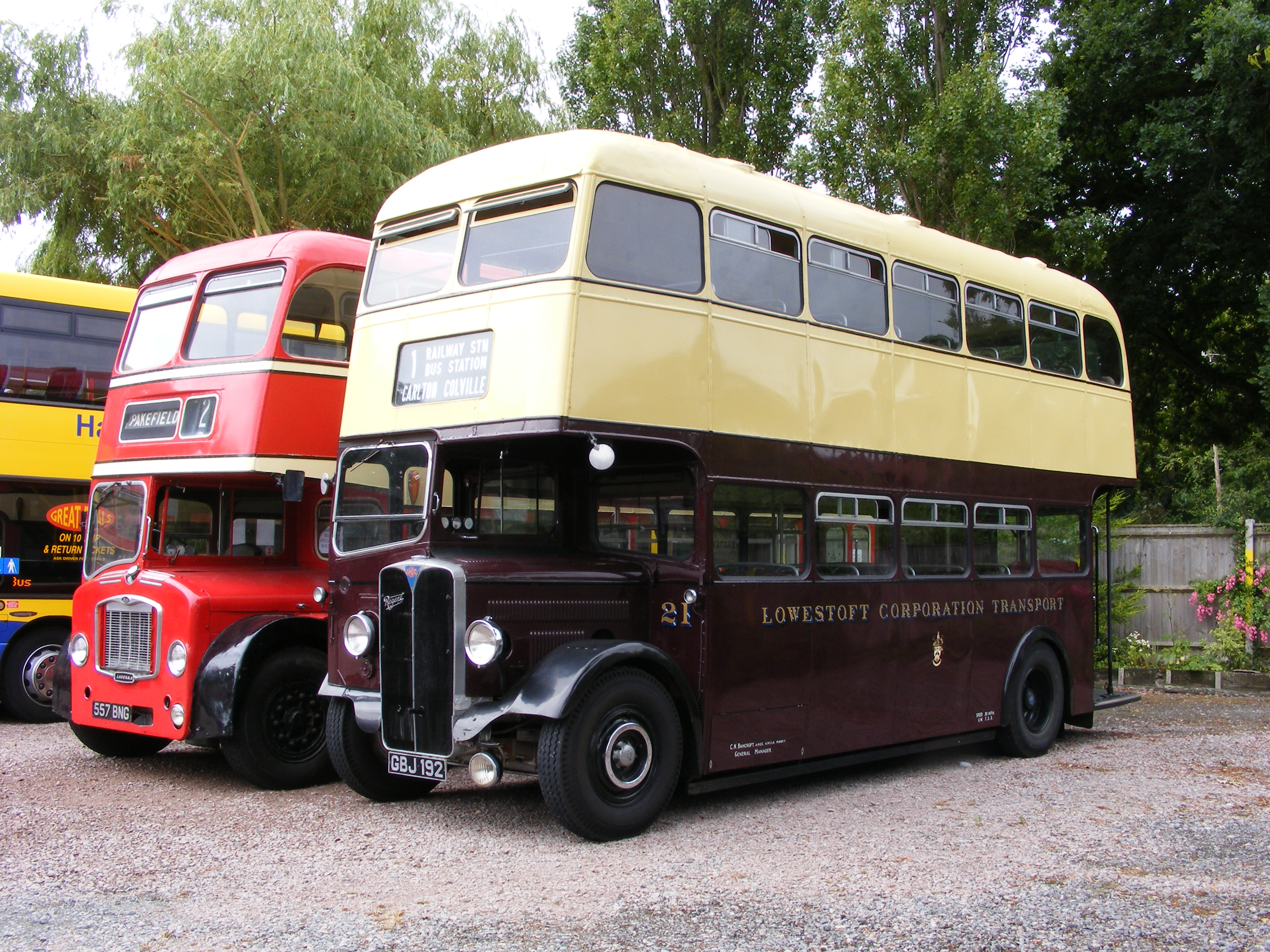
- 1947 AEC Regent II

Overview
- Manufacturer: AEC
- Production: 1945–1947
- Assembly: United Kingdom: Southall

Body and chassis
- Doors: 1 door
- Floor type: Step entrance

Powertrain
- Engine: AEC
- Transmission: Non-synchromesh manual

Chronology
- Predecessor: AEC Regent I
- Successor: AEC Regent III

The AEC Regent II was a front-engined double-decker bus built by AEC from 1945 to 1947. Despite officially being a new type it was very similar to the 1929 Regent. The Regent IIs were all documented as being new with the A173 (also known as the 7.7-litre) engine and a four speed sliding mesh gearbox. The only vehicles that were not standard were the 100 purchased by B.M.M.O. (Birmingham & Midland Motor Omnibus Company), which were classified as O661/20 as the front had to be re-designed so they could carry similar bonnets and radiator grilles that B.M.M.O. had designed for the double deckers they built themselves.

== Operators ==
The only other Regent IIs to differ from standard were Dundee Corporation's fleet of ex-London Transport STLs, all of which carried flared-bottomed Weymann bodies. Dundee changed the sliding mesh gearbox for the pre-selective version - a move which may have been expected from a concern like London Transport (who favoured pre-select vehicles) but not of a corporation buying vehicles second-hand. Other operators who bought Regent IIs new included Liverpool Corporation (100, A225-324), Kingston-upon-Hull Corporation, Lowestoft Corporation, Morecambe and Heysham Corporation, Mansfield and District, Reading Corporation, City of Oxford Motor Services, Ebor Bus Co of Mansfield. The twenty from London purchased by Norths, a dealer and were sold to a variety of operators such as Grimsby-Cleethorpes Transport, Widnes and Dundee Corporations.

== Survivors ==
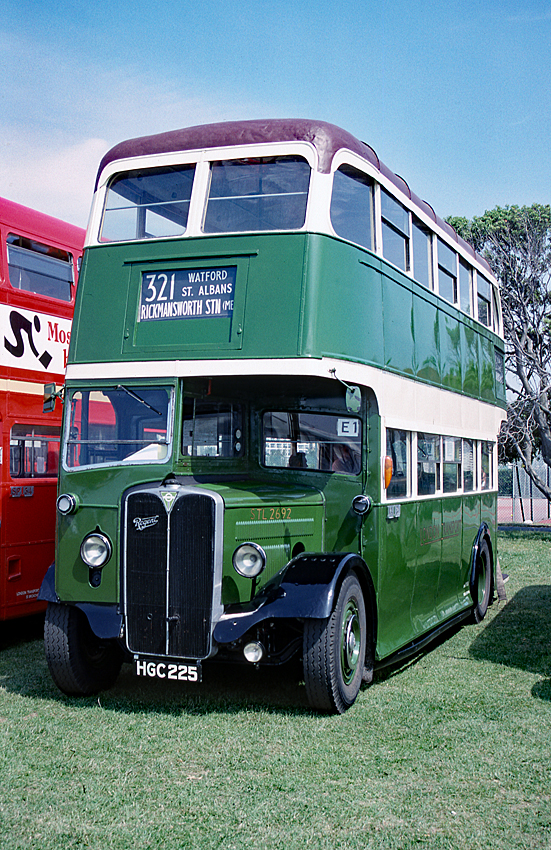
STL2692 AEC Regent II Weymann on Southsea Common

Out of almost 700 buses produced between 1945 and 1947, only nine survive. Two of those are derelict in the United States and one in England was converted to a lighting vehicle by Morecambe & Heysham after colliding with a railway station canopy, and survives in Yorkshire. Now the only place it is possible to ride on a Regent II is at the East Anglia Transport Museum near Lowestoft.

A former Liverpool Corporation example, GKD 434, exists but little work has been done on it since the 1970s due to obsolete parts.

There is also one in British Columbia, Canada which is running and ready to be restored.

In 1968, an ex-Reading Corporation vehicle, CRD 253, was bought by a couple of Scottish students at St Andrews University, converted to provide sleeping and cooking facilities, and driven from Perth to Istanbul and back via various Eastern European countries. It was subsequently sold to a Belgian enthusiast and last seen in 1981, apparently abandoned by the roadside, near Brussels.
