= AEC Regent V =

British front-engined double-decker bus

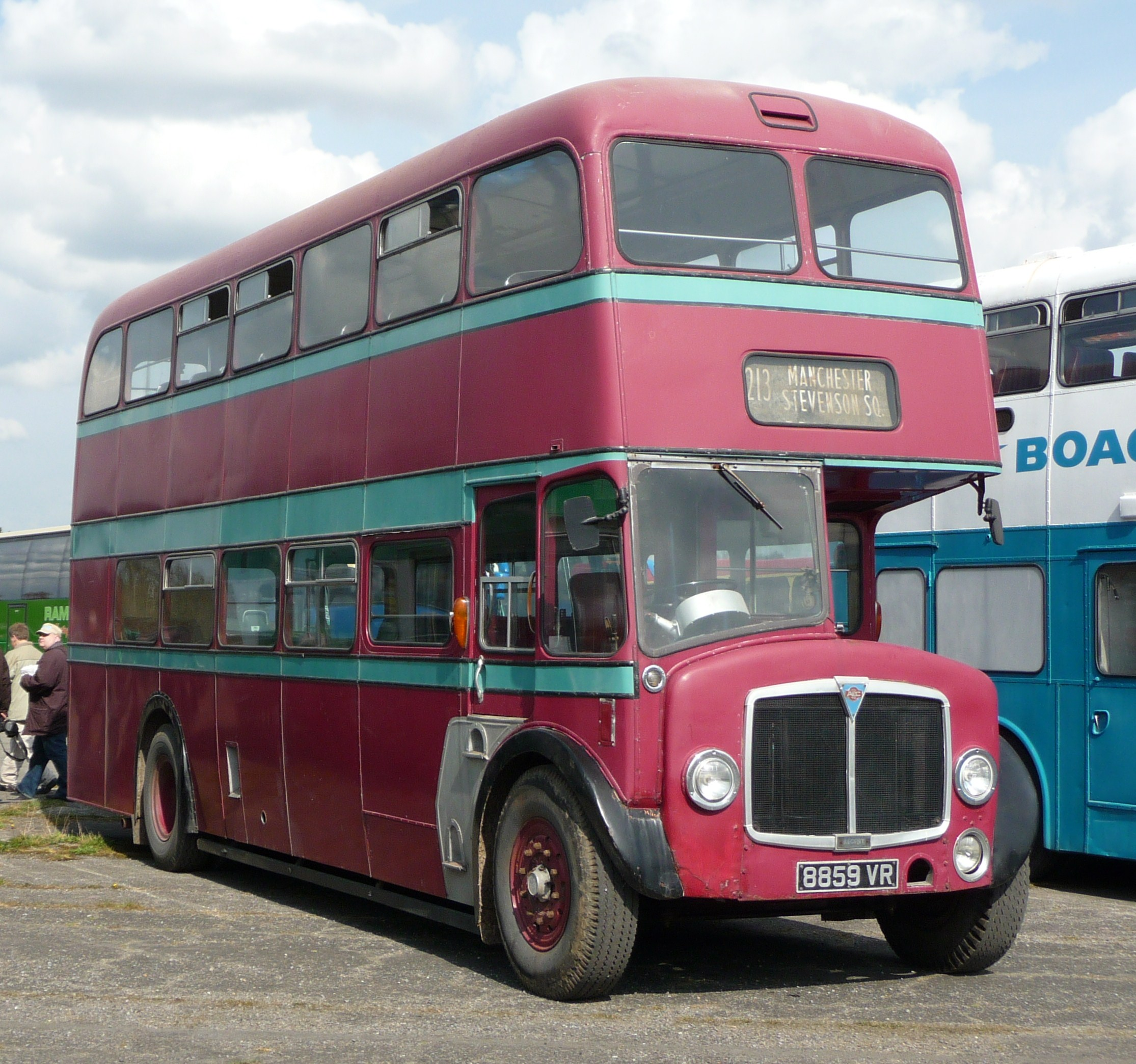
- Mayne Coaches Regent V at the 2009 Cobham bus rally at Wisley Airfield

Overview
- Manufacturer: AEC
- Production: 1954–1969
- Assembly: United Kingdom:: Southall

Body and chassis
- Doors: 1 or 2 door
- Floor type: Step entrance

Powertrain
- Engine: AEC/Gardner
- Transmission: AEC

Dimensions
- Length: 27 ft (8.2 m), 30 ft (9.1 m), 34 ft (10 m)

The AEC Regent V was a front-engined double-decker bus built by the Associated Equipment Company between 1954 and 1969. It was the last AEC Regent series double-decker model, and was the successor to the AEC Regent III (not to be confused with the AEC Regent IV underfloor-engine double-decker bus, which never entered production).

The Regent V had AEC's own frontal design and concealed radiator as standard, although some were supplied with the radiator exposed at customer's request. It was fitted with an AEC engine or Gardner 6LW engine, coupled to a synchromesh or AEC Monocontrol semi-automatic or fully automatic gearbox.

It was purchased by a number of bus operators in the United Kingdom outside London (London Transport bought the AEC Routemaster during that period). The chassis was also sold to Ireland, Portugal, South Africa, Iran, Iraq, Isle of Man and Hong Kong. Kowloon Motor Bus, the sole operator of AEC Regent Vs in Hong Kong, received a total of 210 Regent Vs with extra long wheelbase in 1960s. They had 34-foot-long (10 m) bodywork (longer than contemporary British standard of 30 feet (9.1 m)) supplied by British Aluminium Company or Metal Sections.

In 1968, Britain's Labour government introduced the Bus Grant, which encouraged the introduction of one-person bus operation. This led to the country's front-engined double-decker buses being phased out, as rear or mid-engine designs allowed the passengers to pay fares directly to the driver. The last AEC Regent V entered service in 1969.
