= AEC Regent I =

Double decker bus manufactured by AEC between 1929-1942

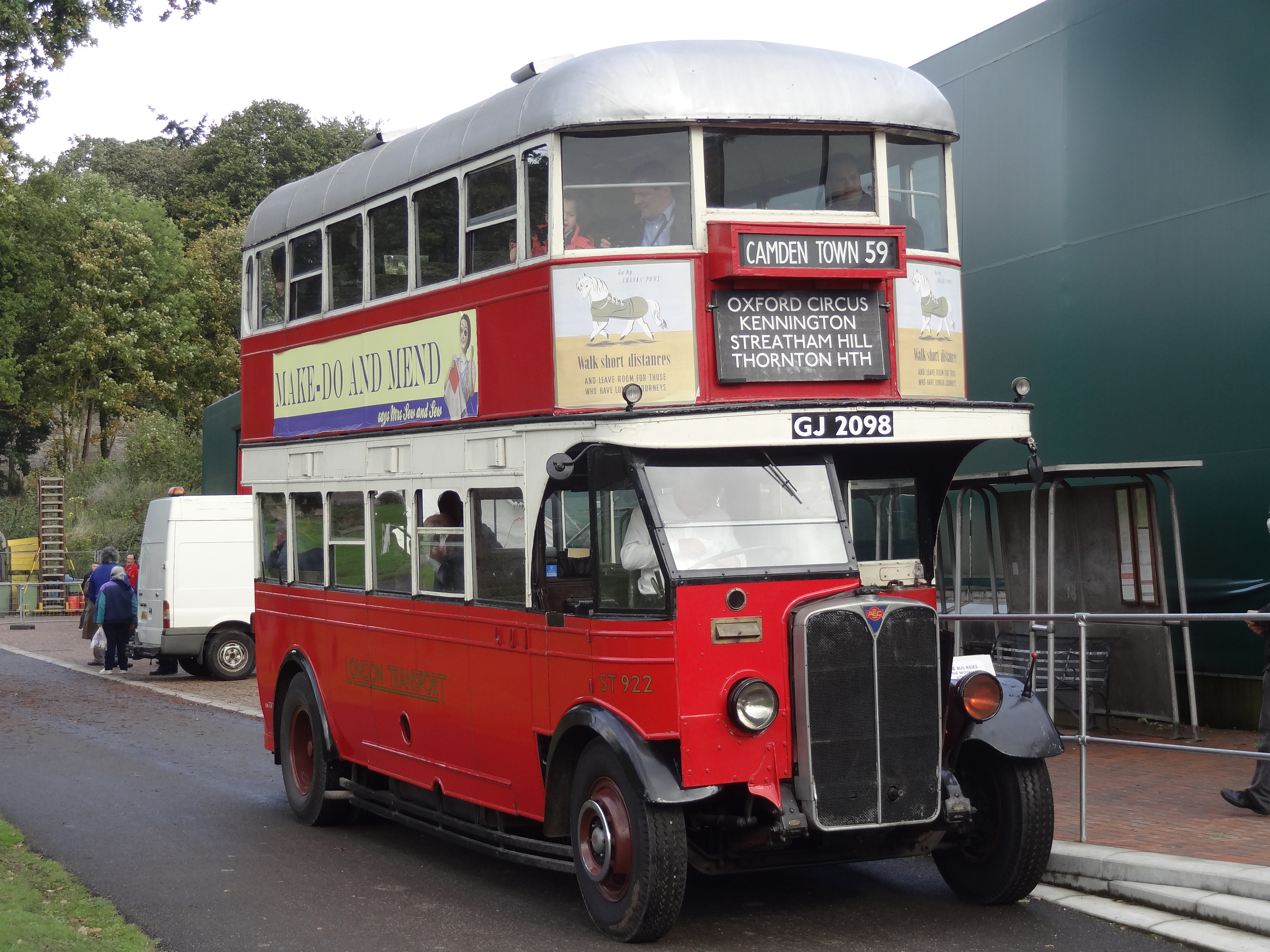
- ST 922 at Brooklands

Overview
- Manufacturer: AEC
- Production: 1929–1942
- Assembly: United Kingdom: Southall

Body and chassis
- Floor type: Step entrance
- Related: AEC Regal I

Chronology
- Successor: AEC Regent II

The AEC Regent I was a double-decker bus chassis manufactured by AEC from 1929 to 1942.

== History ==
The AEC Regent was a bus chassis introduced by AEC in 1929. Twelve pre-production examples had been completed by July 1929, with mainstream production commencing in October 1929. Over 7,900 were manufactured, many of which saw service with the London Passenger Transport Board as the ST and STL classes. Other users included Bournemouth, Exeter, Glasgow and Leeds Corporations. It was succeeded by the AEC Regent II in 1942.

== Survivors ==
- Birmingham City Transport 486 at the Transport Museum Wythall
- Thomas Tilling 922 at the London Bus Museum
