= Leyland Tiger (front-engined) =

Leyland Tiger (TS)
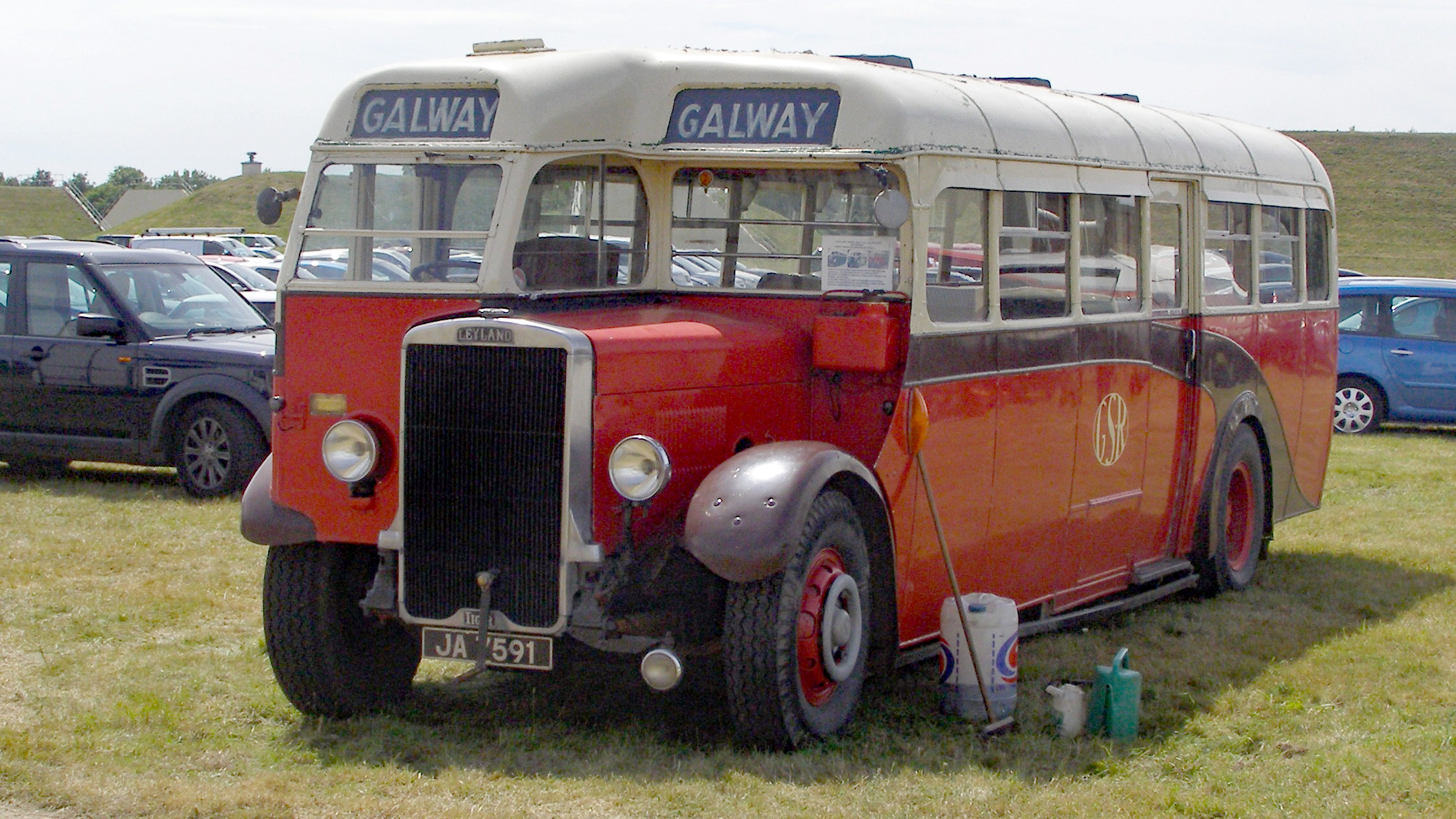
- North Western Leyland Tiger TS7

Overview
- Manufacturer: Leyland Motors
- Production: 1927 — 1942; 1946 — 1968

Body and chassis
- Doors: 1 door as standard, various options with coachwork
- Floor type: Step entrance

Powertrain
- Engine: Leyland Motors 6-cylinder in-line OHC. Petrol 6.5, 7.4 or 10.5 litre or diesel 8.6 litre direct injection, 100–200 bhp
- Capacity: 28-39 seats
- Transmission: Leyland 4-speed sliding mesh, later constant-mesh with optional external overdrive unit, or from 1933-39 Leyland Lysolm-Smith Torque Converter.

Dimensions
- Length: 27 ft 6 in (8.38 m) to 30 ft (9.1 m)
- Width: 7 ft 6 in (2.29 m)

The Leyland Tiger is a heavyweight half-cab single-decker bus and coach chassis built by Leyland Motors between 1927 — 1942 and 1946 — 1968.

The Tiger was always very closely related to the Titan of its time, sharing a ladder type frame dropped in the wheelbase and gently rising in curves over the axles, generally only differing in wheelbase.

== Pre-war Leyland Tiger TS series ==
In conjunction with the original Titan, Leyland Motors offered the same mechanical advances in a single-deck bus or coach chassis, in half-cab (forward-control) form this was called the Tiger, with normal-control derivatives with the driver behind the engine bonnet and sharing the saloon with the passengers generally being called Tigress. The Tiger went through derivatives from TS1 to TS11 between 1927 and 1942.

=== Origins and prototypes ===
The Leyland Titan TD1 was unveiled at the Commercial Motor show at London's Olympia exhibition hall in November 1927, it was then unique amongst double deckers in having a light enough frame to run two-axled on pneumatic tyres (two at the front and four at the back) yet carry 52 passengers in a bus of 25 ft (7.6 m) overall length, with such refinements as a six-cylinder overhead-camshaft petrol engine and an unprecedentedly-low frame. The Tiger TS1 was its single–deck counterpart. The wheelbase was slightly longer at 17 ft 6 in (5.33 m) allowing bodywork up to 27 ft 6 in (8.38 m) long, with up to 35 seats. The first Tiger TS1 (chassis 60001A), bodied by Leyland was loaned in March 1927 to H.M.S. Catherwood Ltd of Belfast, it was purchased by them and, sold to other firms, it worked in Ireland until 1940.

=== Variants ===
At the time the Tiger was launched there were no rules across Great Britain on a bus or coach's overall dimensions; these depended on what a local council empowered to license vehicles to an operator would allow.

In response to varied demand, the TS1 was curtailed to become the TS2, which had the same wheelbase but an overall body length of 26 ft (7.9 m), and then the TS3 was introduced for the same body length, but with the Titan's 16 ft 7 in (5.05 m) wheelbase. Later, the TS8 was revised with a shorter bonnet to become the TS8 (special). SMT and Alexanders especially favoured that type as it could seat 39 rather than 35 in the 27 ft 6 in (8.38 m) maximum length allowed for two-axle single deckers (see later).

=== Instant success ===
Not only did the Tiger catch the imagination of British Isles fleet-owners looking for better performance from their buses and coaches it also sold overseas to Sweden, South Africa, India, New Zealand, Canada, Argentina and Australia, the Canadian versions being lengthened to a 19 ft (5.8 m) wheel-base, for a 30 ft body and having the engines uprated to 100 bhp, geared to a top speed of 60 mph (97 km/h).

=== Later derivatives ===
TS4 was a type-mnemonic given to an interim Tiger with Titan TD2 features. TS5 was omitted as it was felt this would cause confusion with the contemporary Leyland Lion LT5.

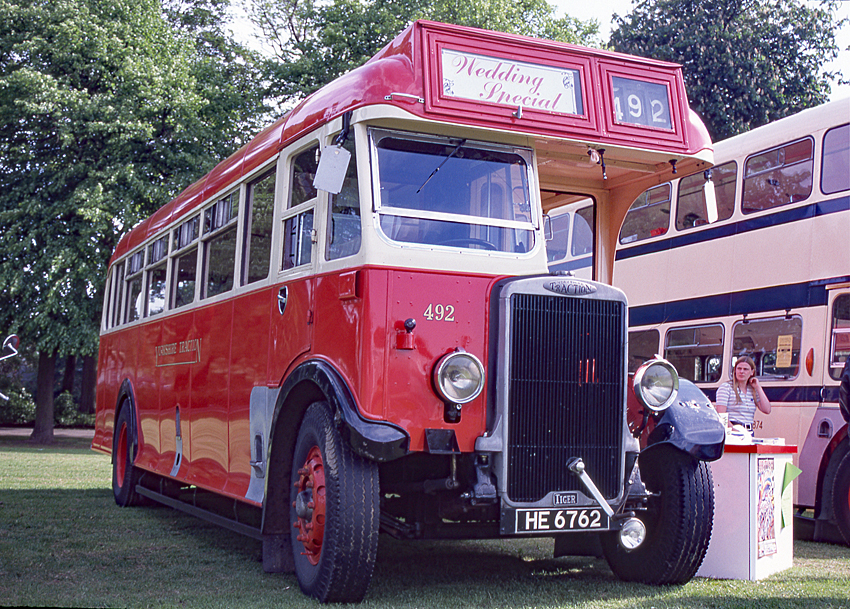
Yorkshire Traction 492 Leyland Tiger TS7 on display at Hillsborough

The next thoroughly new type was the TS6 from January 1933; this had all the improvements afforded to the contemporary TD3 Titan, including the neater front radiator and bonnet assembly, but the same wheelbase and overall-length as the TS1. For operators requiring 30 ft long single–decks a TS6D or TS6T Tiger was made available from 1934, the TS6D was 6x4 and the TS6T 6x2 with only the leading axle in the rear bogie powered. The TS7 and TS8 (and three-axled variants) were similarly derived from the TD4 and TD5 Titans, adopting their features. The suffix c (e.g., TS8c) indicated a torque-converter transmission. The TS9 and TS10 Tigers were never released for sale but the TS11 was equivalent to the TD7 Titan although very few were built, most during World War II. During that war, the SMT group of bus companies in Scotland, converted many of their two and three-axle Tigers to Titan specification and fitted double-deck 55-seat bodies to them.

During the 1930s, the Leyland 8.6-litre diesel engine became more common in bus and then coach Tigers and by the end of the decade, very few operators were taking full-sized Leyland buses or coaches with petrol engines. Leyland did not offer a full-size petrol engine after the war.

=== Tigresses and Lionesses ===
Very few of the initial Leyland Tigress (TB1) were built; instead Tiger running-units in the existing Leyland Lioness frame produced the Leyland Lioness-Six, model LTB1.

In the mid-1930s with Lioness frames exhausted the later full-size normal-control Leyland-built single decks were called Tigresses, an L prefix was added for left-hand drive versions, such as the large batch of LLTB3 ordered by Riga City Council. 71 of the ordered 90 of which were delivered to Latvia before the outbreak of World War II. The only UK customers for Tigresses were exclusive up-market coach-tour firms like Southdown Motor Services who took the LTB3 (equivalent to the TS6) or the LTB5 (equivalent to the TS8).

=== The FEC ===
In conjunction with London Transport from 1937 Leyland developed the Tiger FEC, the initials stood for flat-engined coach. The Leyland 8.6-litre engine (with revised sump) was mounted horizontally in mid wheel-base driving through a Wilson fluid-flywheel and an air-actuated AEC mechanical pre-selector gearbox. The gearbox was basically the same as used in the AEC Regent STL but it was fitted with an externally mounted air cylinder which actuated the bus bar to engage and disengage the gears. It worked in the opposite way from that in the slightly later RT type double decker in that air pressure was used to disengage the gears instead of being used to keep them engaged. When the gear change pedal was released it allowed the selected gear to engage by means of spring pressure in that same way as the gearbox in the STL. The system caused problems in that if a vehicle was left with a gear engaged and as the air pressure leaked off, it was not possible to disengage that gear until air pressure had been built up again. Because of this, there were a number of garage incidents caused by vehicles being left overnight with a gear still engaged. 88 of this type were built but 12 were destroyed during World War II, the rest serving until 1954-5 as Green Line coaches.

=== The Gnu and Panda ===
These were 30 ft (9.1 m) single deckers with twin-steering front axles. The Gnu had a front-mounted vertical engine and either front or central doors. The TEP1 sold three, two to Scottish operator Walter Alexander who built 41-seat front entrance bus and coach bodies, the first one a 1937 Earls' Court show exhibit. The other one went to City Coach Company of Brentwood Essex, who fitted a centre-door 43-seat Duple body. City had bought large numbers of three-axle Tigers and was the only customer for the TEC2 Gnu, designed for centre-entrance bodywork, and having much more in common with the Leyland Steer lorry.

The sole Leyland Panda entered service with Walter Alexander in 1941, it had an underfloor engine, like the FEC, but lacked the forward entrance of that operator's Gnus, it was bodied by Alexander with 45 seats and a central entrance to a semi-utility outline.

=== Enigma, The LS1 ===
BFU225, entered service with the Lincolnshire Road Car Company in early 1941, the operator called it "Leyland light-six prototype model LS1". It had a 6.2-litre push-rod overhead-valve Leyland engine and a radiator shell of Tiger outline, but as thin across as a Lion or Cheetah's radiator shell. It ran with its 35-seat Leyland body until the mid-1950s.

BFU225's engine-design was bored and stroked for use in tanks, and it then became the 7.4-litre 100 bhp E181 engine used in early post-war Titans and Tigers.

== Postwar Leyland Tiger PS series ==
Leyland Tiger (PS)
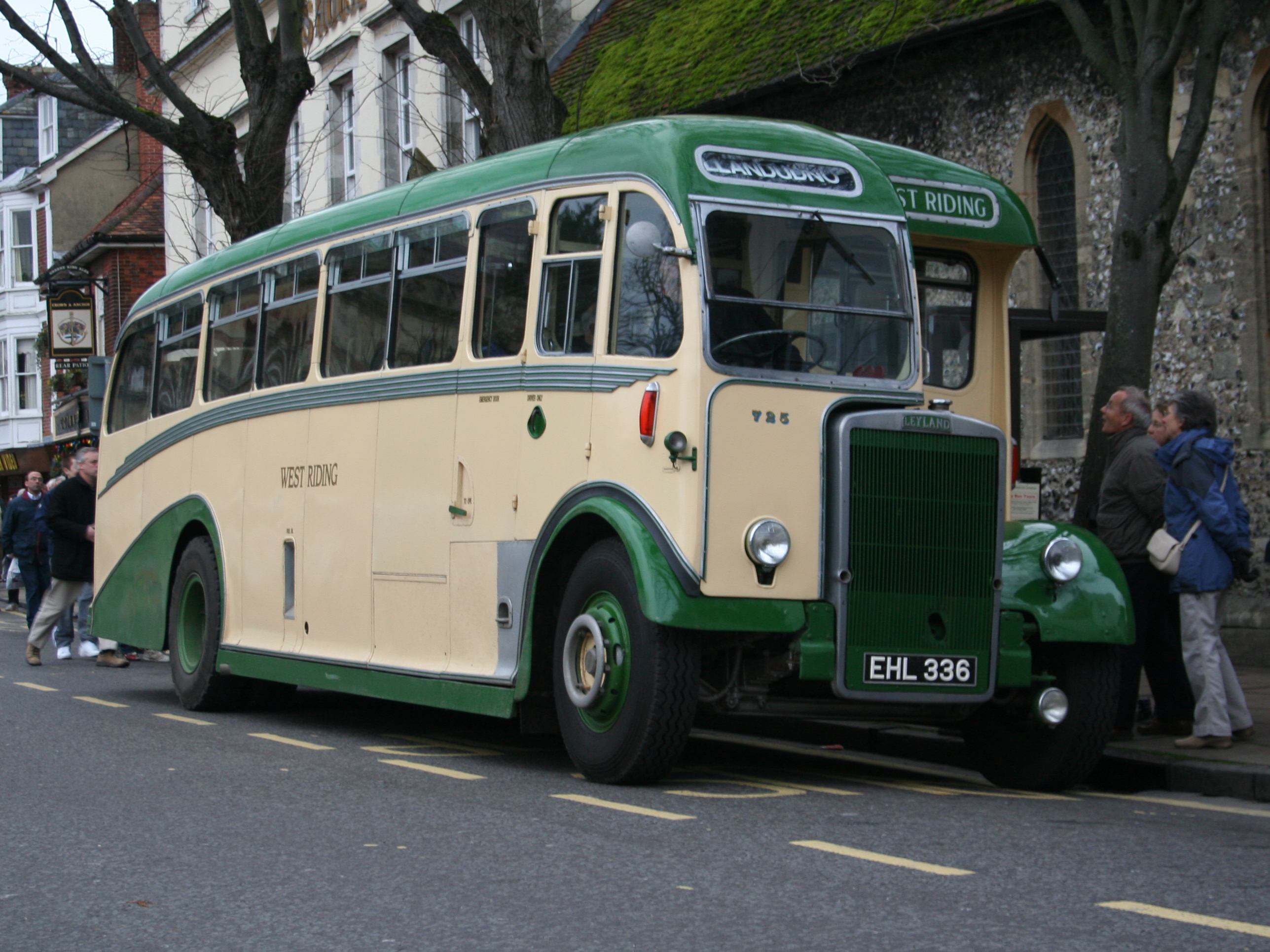
- West Riding Leyland Tiger PS2

Overview
- Manufacturer: Leyland Motors

Body and chassis
- Doors: 1 door as standard, various options with coachwork
- Floor type: Step entrance

Powertrain
- Engine: (PS1) Leyland E181 7.4-litre 6-cylinder ohv diesel engine; (OPS1) Leyland E87 8.6-litre ohc diesel engine; (PS2, OPSU2, OPSU3) Leyland O600 9.8-litre ohv engine; (OPSU4) Leyland 600 or Leyland 680 11.1-litre engine, 100–200 bhp
- Transmission: (PS1/OPS1) Leyland constant mesh, 4 speeds; (PS2/OPSU2,3,4/1,4) Leyland synchromesh 4 speeds; (OPSU4/2,5) Leyland-Self-Changing Gears Pneumocyclic direct selection semi-automatic, 4 or 5 speeds

Dimensions
- Length: 27 ft 6 in (8.38 m) to 36 ft (11 m)

The postwar Leyland Tiger built from 1946 to 1968 sold well at home and overseas. After about 1950 however many customers, especially at home but also in export markets decided they preferred the greater carrying capacity of the underfloor-engined vehicle so Tiger sales reduced as models such as the Olympic, Royal Tiger, Tiger Cub and Worldmaster were launched. That said the Tiger was very reliable, very simple to work upon and very durable and continued to sell in a profitable niche in 'dirt road' markets until the lines were closed in 1968.

Whilst retaining the dimensions of the Titan TD7 and Tiger TS11, the 1945 Titan PD1 and Tiger PS1 were entirely new designs featuring a new E181 7.4-litre engine with pushrod valve operation and a brand new four-speed constant mesh gearbox. The export versions with an O prefix for overseas markets, the OPS1, not only had longer wheelbases (where legally applicable) but were equipped with the pre-war design overhead-camshaft E87 engine, which had the same nominal 100 bhp output but was larger at 8.6 litres. No UK operator took the OPS1 but Potteries Motor Traction took a batch of long-wheelbase OPD1 Titans as single-deckers, later rebodying them as double decks once overall length rules had been relaxed to allow this. When fitted with left-hand drive, the Tiger became the LOPS1, this prefix attaching to all left-hand drive Leyland buses (and Leyland-designed British United Traction trolleybuses) until the mid-1960s when later designs adopted a suffix letter for driving control position.

PS1 buses sold well, customers ranging in size from London Transport (who took two batches totalling 131 buses) through municipal fleets, members of the British Electric Traction and British Transport Commission groups through independent regional firms to small independents, although there were competitive chassis from Albion Motors, Associated Equipment Company, Bristol, Crossley Motors, Daimler, Dennis, Foden, Guy, Maudslay, Thornycroft and Tilling-Stevens, the Tiger vied with the AEC Regal for market leadership. Outside Great Britain the PS1 also went to Jersey, the Isle of Man, Northern Ireland and the Irish Republic.

There was only one mass-produced derivative of the PS1, this was the coach variant with drop-frame extension for a luggage boot. This was coded PS1/1, and was a very strong seller, forming the major postwar fleet renewals for large UK coach firms such as Southdown Motor Services, Ribble, Wallace Arnold, Grey-Green and Barton Transport. Sales of the PS1 only ended in 1950 although it was nominally replaced by the PS2 on the home market from 1948, this gives an idea of the scale of advance orders for this coach. Many coachbuilders worldwide produced bodies on the Tiger PS, as the model was introduced at the all-time peak in demand for new buses and coaches few operators could get the body of their first choice within an acceptable time. Barton got most of its coaches fitted with Duple bodies but built its own body for its 490 (HVO729), to an American outline with shallow full-depth sliding side glazing. Wallace Arnold bought over a Leeds coachbuilder, Wilks and Meade, in 1942 to get enough bodies reserved for postwar reconstruction. Between 1946 and 1950 Wallace Arnold took 37 PS1, 11 PS2, 34 Bedford OB, 24 AEC Regals, ten Daimler CVD6 and one Guy Arab, a fairly typical sample of coach-buying preferences at the time. Southdown used six coachbuilders on its all-Tiger coach fleet. Whilst Ribble refitted its later prewar Tiger coaches (which had previously been petrol-engined) with PS1 running units as well as taking PS1/1s.

The PS2 followed the PD2 Titan in having the 125 bhp 9.8-litre O600 engine and a new synchromesh gearbox. With changes to rules on width and length there were numerous different versions of the home market PS2 based on permutations of width and length, whether built with or without a rear dropped frame and whether reconstructed from short-wheelbase chassis or built new to the longer wheelbase. PS2/1, 3, 5 and 7 had a 17 ft 6 in (5.33 m) wheelbase for 27 ft 6 in (8.38 m) bodywork. PS2/10, 11, 12, 12A, 13, 13A, 14 and 15 had a longer wheelbase of 18 ft 9 in (5.72 m) for 30 ft (9.1 m) long coachwork (but see later about the six-wheel PS2/10 and /11). The entire home market Tiger range was vacuum-braked and PS2s for the UK had the synchromesh gearbox only, whilst the Titan PD2 had a number of options including constant-mesh, AEC preselector and Pneumocyclic. The last new PS2 coaches entered service in 1953 with West Riding Automobile Company of Wakefield and two are preserved with one, EHL336, fully restored at the Dewsbury Bus Museum. The last home-market customer for the Tiger PS2 bus was the Burnley, Colne and Nelson Joint Transport Committee, their last arrived in 1955 and put in 20 years and more of work, thus being the last half-cab single deckers on normal service in the UK.

The export range, from 1948 were the OPS2, OPS3 and OPS4. They also featured the O600 engine and synchromesh gearbox as introduced, but air brakes were optional. The OPS2 shared the PS2's 17 ft 6 in (5.33 m) wheelbase, although the frames, springs and axles were heavier duty than their home market equivalents, bodies could be as long as 29 ft 3 in (8.92 m) where laws permitted, the OPS3 was introduced at the same time as the OPS2 but had a 19 ft (5.8 m) wheelbase for bodies up to 31 ft (9.4 m) long. This variant would not have met UK turning circle requirements when the new 30 ft (9.1 m) length was legalised in 1950. Córas Iompair Éireann (CIÉ), the Irish state transport undertaking uniquely took Tigers of both PS2/13 and OPS3 type, these become the last vehicles of over 300 to be numbered in the P series that had started with Dublin United Transport's first Tiger in 1935. Walter Alexander took some OPS2 coaches as well as PS2s but these are believed to have been a frustrated export order. The OPS4, had a 21 ft 3 in (6.48 m) wheelbase for a bodied length of 35 ft (11 m), Duple produced a batch of fifteen LOPS4/3 with Park Royal metal frames in 1949 for coach operators in Buenos Aires and a single coach to the same outline for Gibraltar motorways. Production of the 'overseas' Tiger concentrated in the 1950s on the OPS4/5 variant with exposed radiator, O680 engine, air brakes and Pneumocyclic gearbox as standard, the final (post 1967) versions were coded OPS4A/15 following updates in the Titan range and a rationalisation of nomenclature and components. The last Tiger OPS4s were delivered to South African fleets in 1970, some of these were still working at the turn of the century.

=== Six-wheelers ===
One Heaver-bodied coach for City Coach Company, Romford and two deck and a half airport coaches bodied by the Northern Ireland Road Transport Board for their own use were built to a twin-steering three-axle specification with the second steering axle, which had 17-inch rather than 21-inch wheels, designed to be readily removed once 30 ft length on two axles was legal. City had pre-war operated the largest fleet of the Leyland Gnu twin-steering single decker, switching to them from conventional six-wheeled Tigers.

All three were later converted into Titans, the City coach by Barton Transport and the two Northern Irish vehicles by the Ulster Transport Authority. The City coach was the sole 8 ft (2.4 m) wide PS2/10, the NIRTB/UTA pair were 7 ft 6 in (2.29 m) wide, hence PS2/11.

=== Red Worms ===
Danish state railways took some shortened PS2s together with Büssing units to pull semi-trailer buses built by DAB. These were known as "Red Worms" and worked a high capacity route in suburban Copenhagen in company with Leyland-bodied Titan and Northern Counties bodied Guy Arab double deckers.

=== Israeli Tigresses ===
Dan and Egged, the two Israeli bus co-operatives, had used normal-control former US military vehicles as buses just after the end of World War II, Leyland Ashdod therefore persuaded the Farington works to build LOPSU3's for this market to normal control, they were known as Tigresses after the pre-war LTB bonneted type, but were recorded as Tigers with no separate model designation. Bodies were built in Israel by Ha'argaz and Merkavim. Royal Tigers and Worldmasters followed as did two examples of the PSR1 Lion.

=== Indian Tigers ===
In 1955, although the Comet built in India from 1953 was selling phenomenally well there was a demand for heavier duty single decks. Ashok Leyland, the Indian-based joint venture, started producing its own version of the Tiger, which used the axles of the Ashok Leyland Hippo lorry. It could be seen as a group replacement for the Albion Viking (CX/HD series).

=== Rebuilding ===
The outdated layout of the half-cab single deck and its low seating capacity exercised the minds of a number of operators from the mid-1950s. Barton Transport converted PS1s to 27 ft 6 in (8.38 m) long double-deckers and Tiger PS2s, including the former City coach to 30 ft double deckers, the later ones carrying fully fronted Northern Counties double-deck bodies. Yorkshire Traction, in the BET group did systematic conversions of most of their fleet of Tigers from about 1955 to 1963, using Charles H. Roe or Northern Counties bodies, Yorkshire Woollen District later following suit. Yorkshire Traction also oversaw the rebodying of five PS2s for Stratford Blue Motors, costed refurbishing the chassis at £500 and purchasing the bodies at £3,000 per bus at a time when a complete PD2 would cost over £5,000. Alexander took the running units from its 17 OPS2s in 1961 and fitted them into new Titan PD3 frames, then fitted units from scrapped PS1s into the former OPS2s. When fitted with new Alexander bodies the recycled double-deckers could only be distinguished from similar new deliveries in that they retained the traditional radiator and bonnet from the Tigers whilst the new buses had full-width bonnets. Ulster Transport Authority also rebodied many of its Tigers in the 1950s, using new Leyland Titan PD2 chassis frames and Metro-Cammell bodyframes completed at UTA's Belfast coachworks. CIÉ stripped a late batch of OPS3s of their units and purchased new Titan PD3 frames and St Helens Style glassfibre bonnets, and had the vehicles assembled in 1961-62 complete with Park Royal body frames by a company called Commercial Road Vehicles who were renting part of the former Great Northern Railway (Ireland) central works in Dundalk. These 'R900' Titans were CIÉ's last front-engine double-deckers, again the R series had started in 1934 with Dublin United Transport.

The last two front-engined Tigers known to have been rebodied were two completed by Vernon Priaulx, then coachbuilder for Guernseybus in 1991/2. After the success of open top RT-type AEC Regent III on tourist routes on Guernsey two former Jersey Motor Transport Tiger PS1s were purchased. Their Reading of Portsmouth bodies were too decayed to be restored so the first Tiger was rebodied as a single-deck open topper (Southport Corporation had used Ribble PS2s as such in the 1960s) and the second became a 35-seat coach with full-length sunshine roof. Both went to Mac Tours of Edinburgh after Guernseybus closed and passed to the Ensignbus preserved fleet, although the open topper is to operate a tourist service back on Jersey in 2012. On repatriation to Jersey it was registered J1942.

== Preservation ==
There are many PS-type Tigers in preservation, carrying a wide variety of coachwork, some double-deck. Being smaller and more mechanically basic than a more modern bus they are perhaps easier to look after, but bodywork can often be very fragile.

== See also ==
- NZR RM class (Midland), a 1936 railbus conversion from New Zealand
