= Dewsbury Bus Museum =

Bus museum in Ravensthorpe, West Yorkshire, England

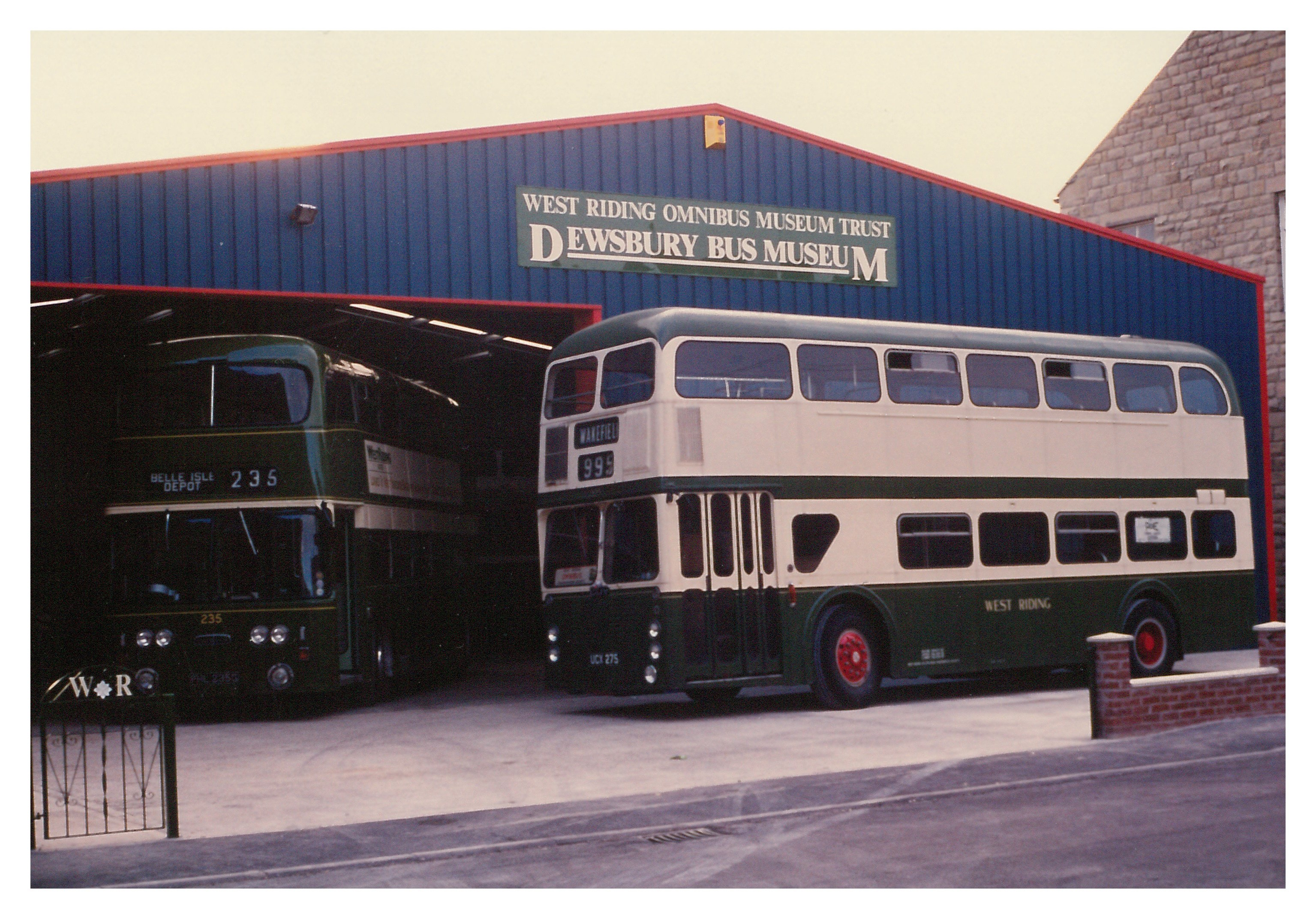
- Guy Wulfrunian UCX275 stands outside the Dewsbury Bus Museum

- Location within West Yorkshire
- Established: 1989
- Location: Ravensthorpe, Dewsbury, West Yorkshire, England
- Coordinates: 53°40′45″N 1°39′55″W
- Type: Transport museum
- Owner: West Riding Omnibus Museum Trust
- Website: www.dewsburybusmuseum.org

The Dewsbury Bus Museum is a museum in Ravensthorpe, West Yorkshire, England. Opened to the public in September 1989, it is owned and operated by the West Riding Omnibus Museum Trust, a registered charity, and is run entirely by volunteer effort.

It is home to the only two surviving Guy Wulfrunian double deck buses and several other West Riding Automobile Company vehicles as well as others from Yorkshire Woollen District Transport Co, Yorkshire Traction Company, West Yorkshire PTE, Huddersfield and Halifax Corporations and local independent J. Wood of Mirfield.

== The collection ==
The collection includes:

- 1948 Leyland Titan PD2 – Leyland body – BHL682 – 640
- 1952 Leyland Tiger PS2 – Roe coach body – EHL336 – 725
- 1952 Leyland Tiger PS2 – Roe bus body – EHL344 – 733
- 1956 AEC Reliance bus – Roe DP body – JHL708 – 808
- 1957 AEC Reliance coach – Roe Dalesman body – JHL983 – 903
- 1957 Guy Arab MkIV – Roe body – KHL855 – 855
- 1961 Guy Wulfrunian – Roe body – UCX275 – 995
- 1963 Guy Wulfrunian – Roe body – WHL970 – 970
- 1967 Leyland Panther – Roe body – LHL164F – 164
- 1970 Bristol RELL – ECW body – THL261H – 261
- 1982 Leyland National 2 – Integral – XUA73X – 73
- 1984 Leyland Olympian – ECW body – A577NWX – 577
- 1987 Leyland Royal Tiger Doyen – Integral – E50TYG – 50

== Gallery ==
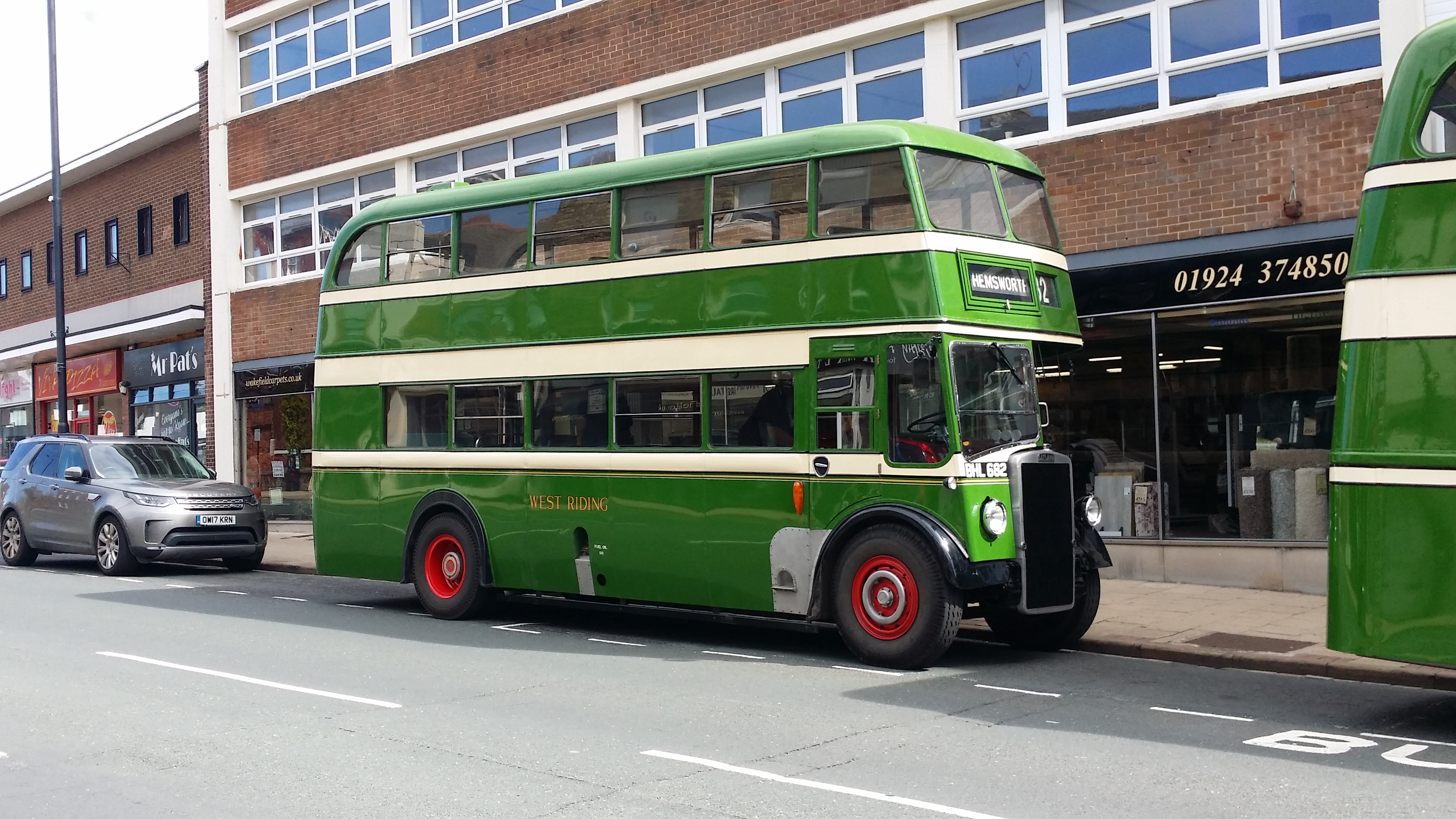
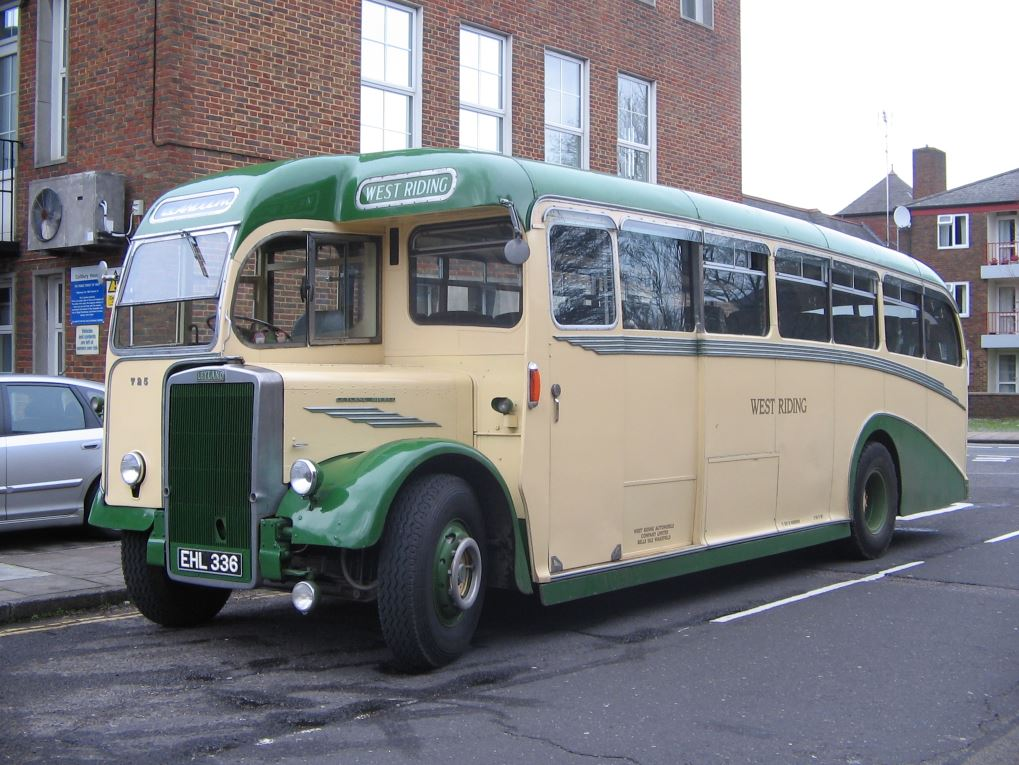
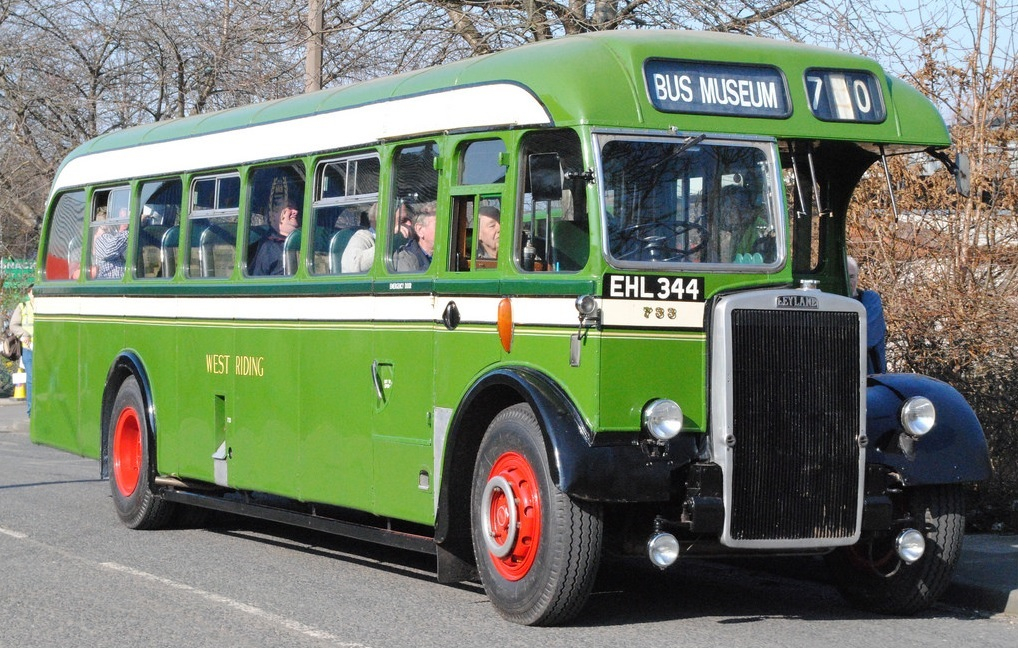
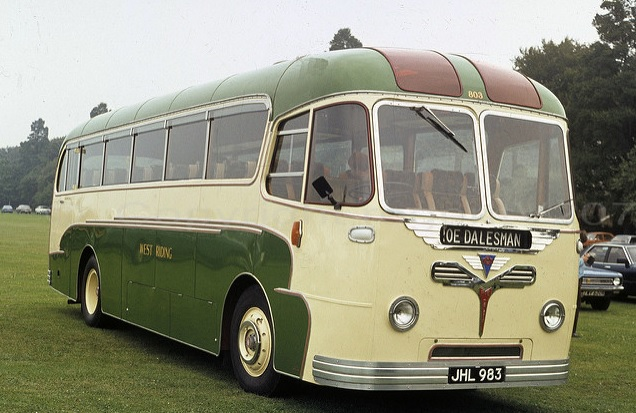

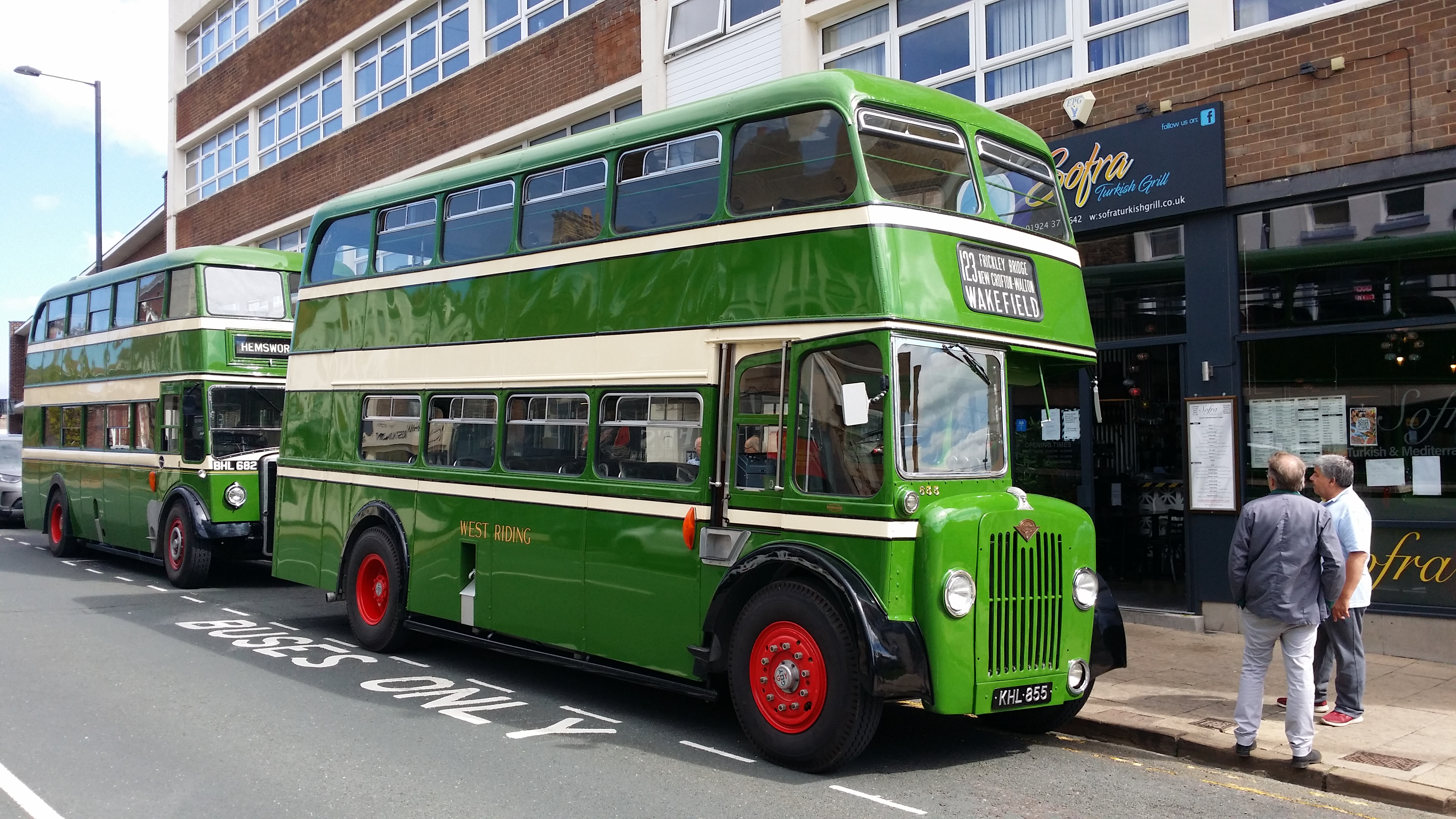
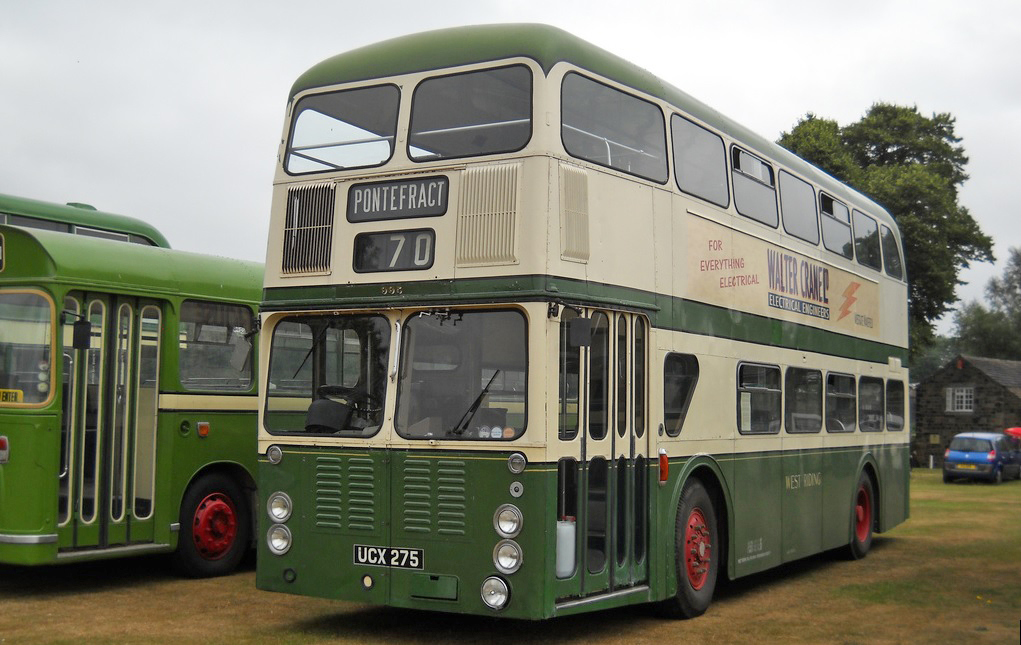
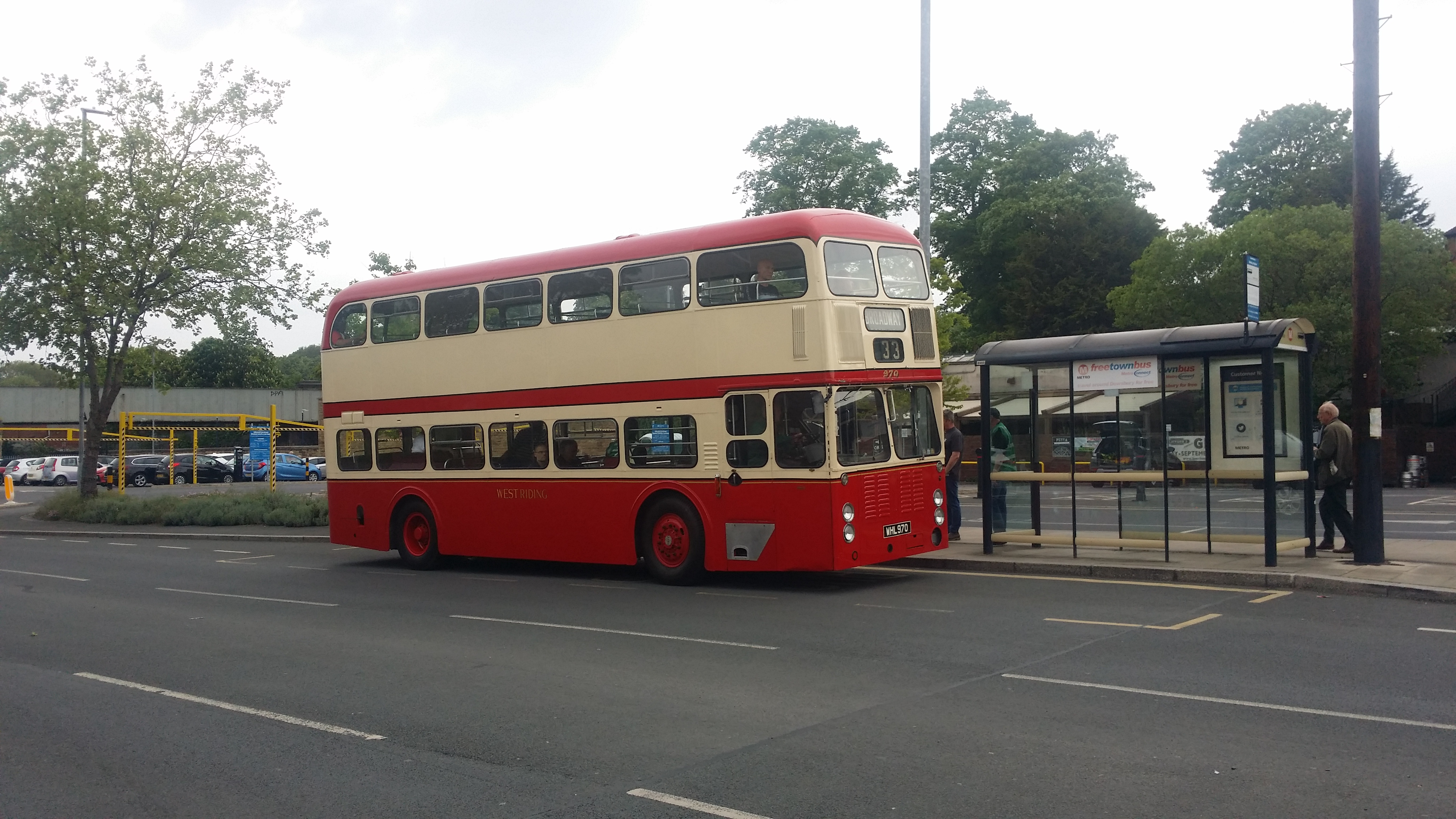
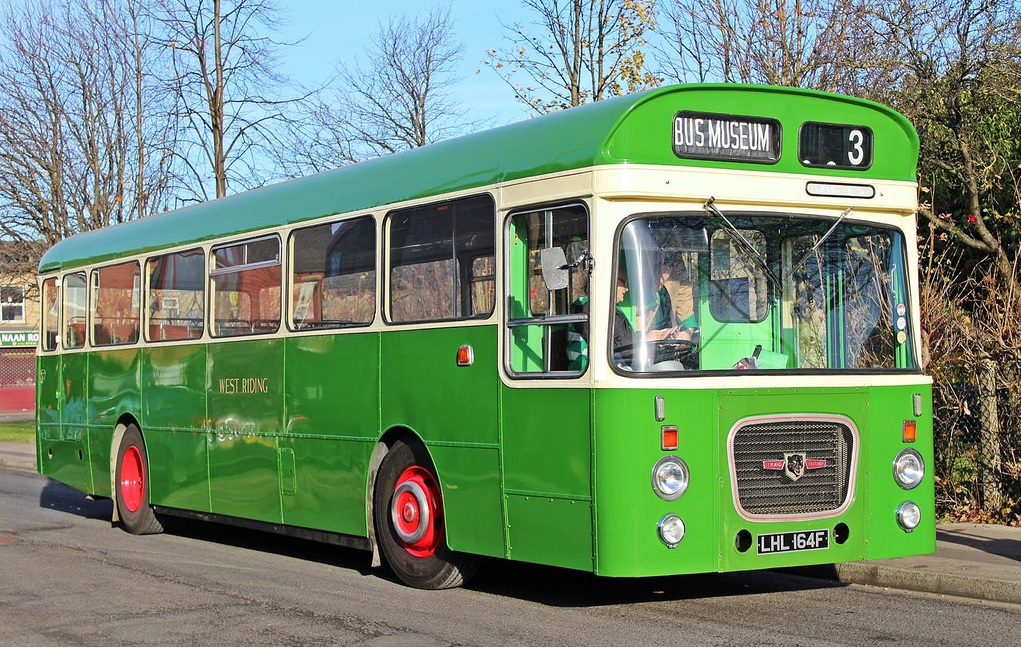

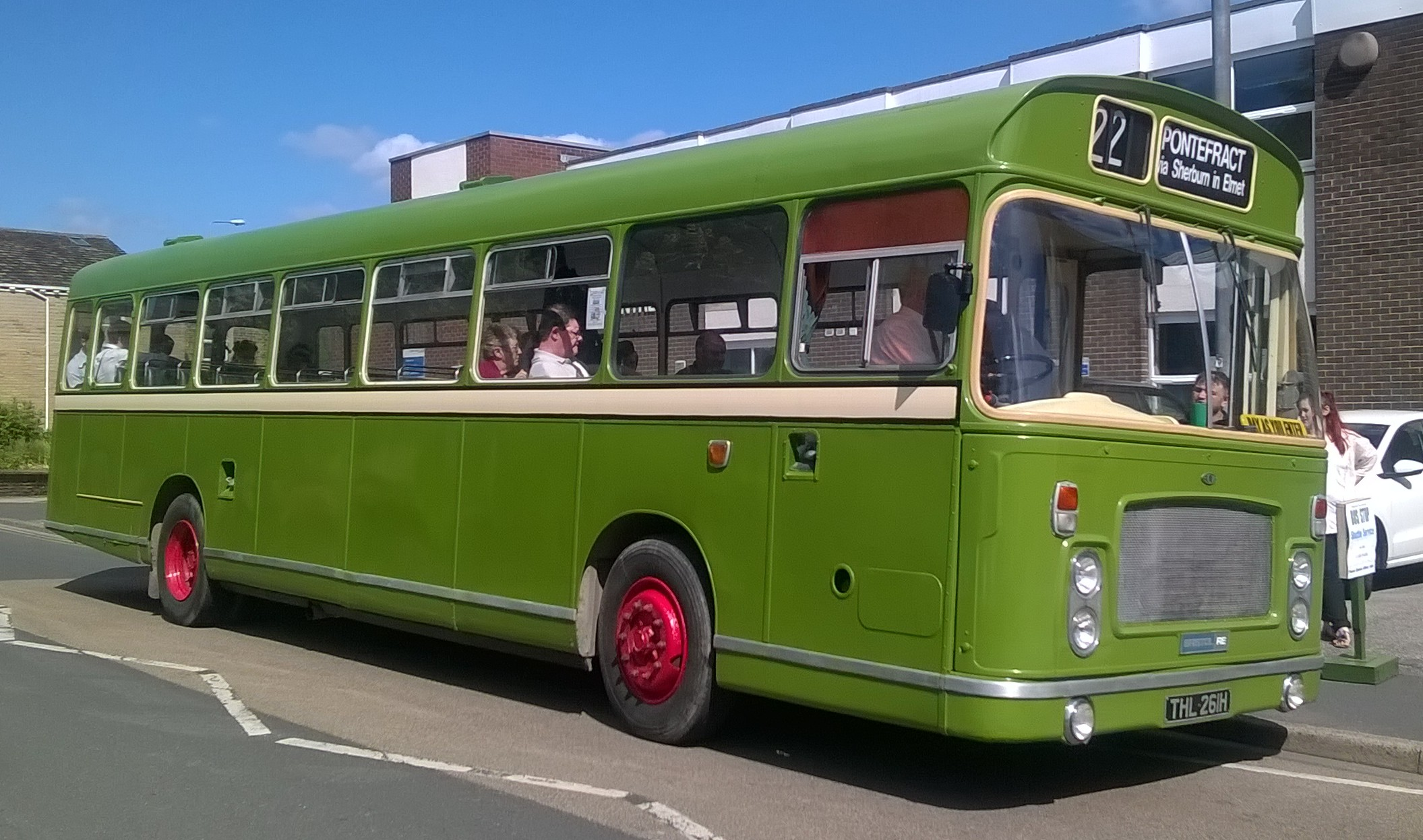
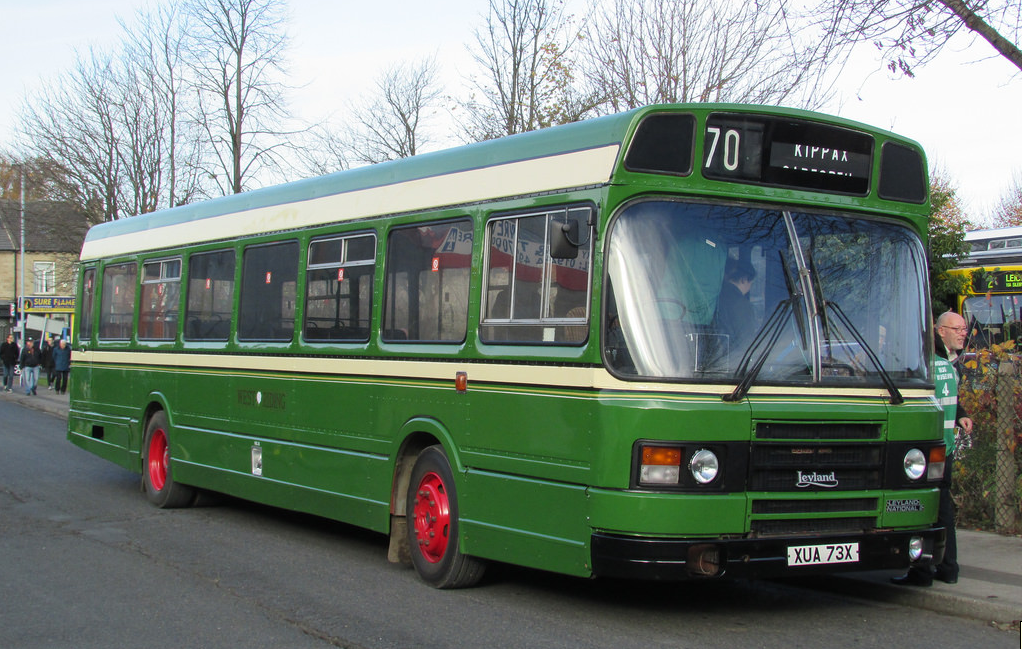
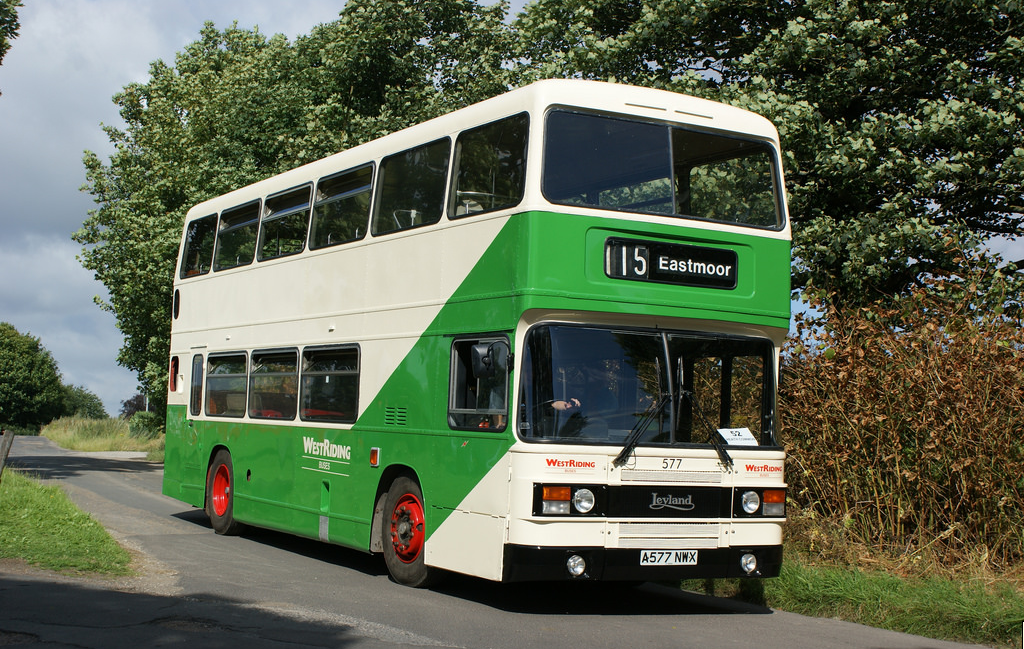
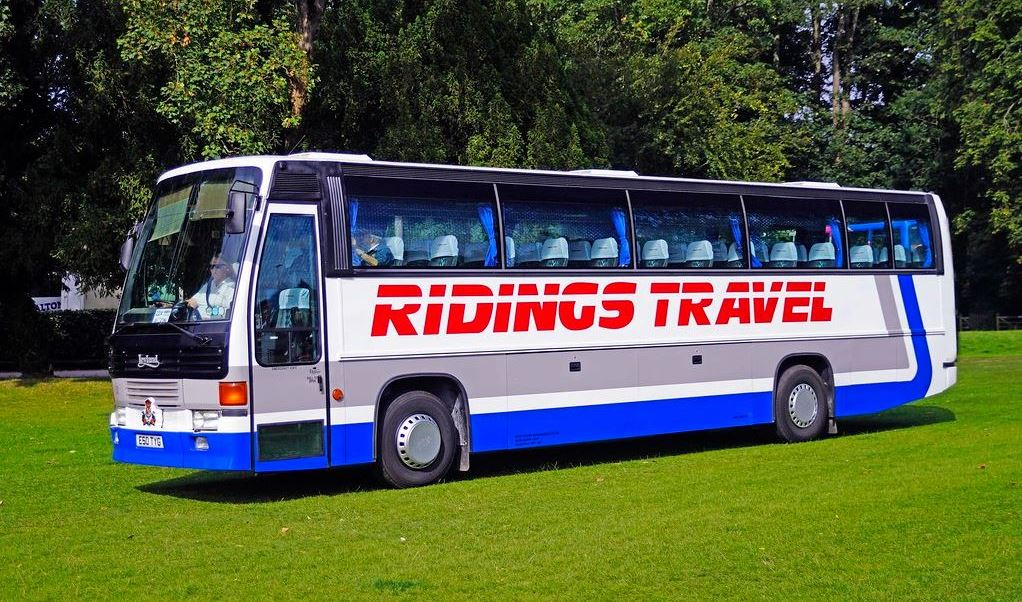

== Events ==
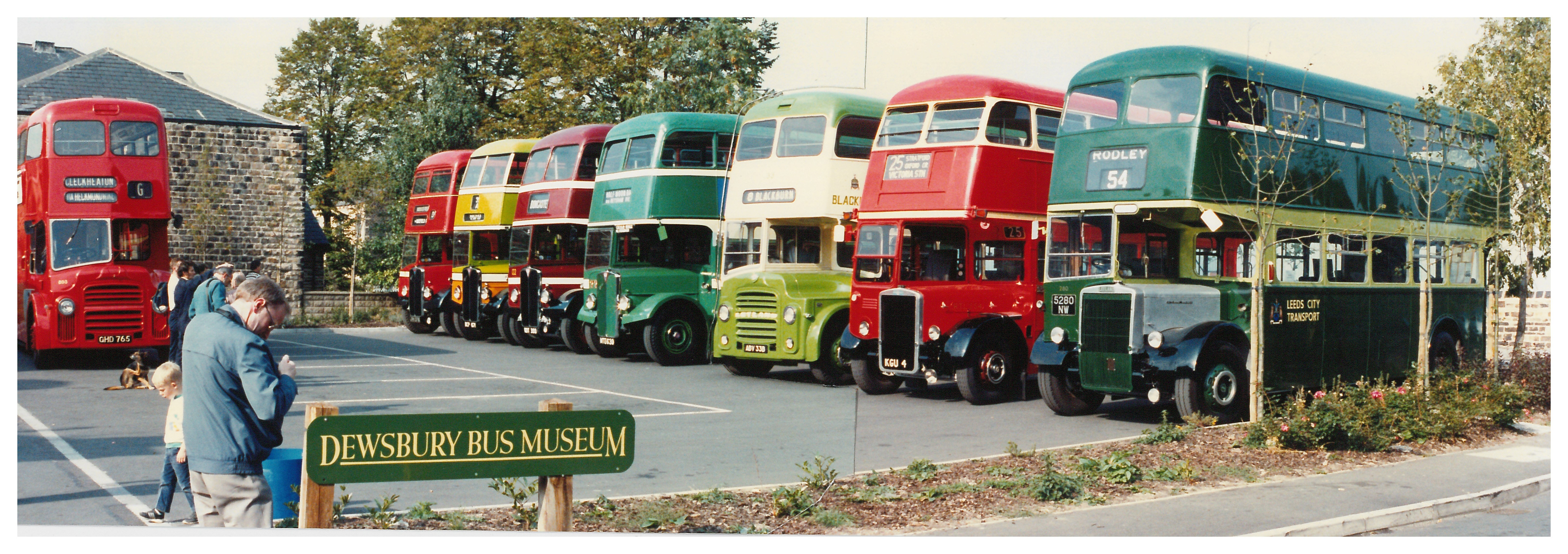
A scene from the first anniversary Open Day at the Dewsbury Bus Museum in 1990

The museum holds a number of Open Days and other events throughout the year, and these are well attended, with many visiting vehicles.

== Site history ==
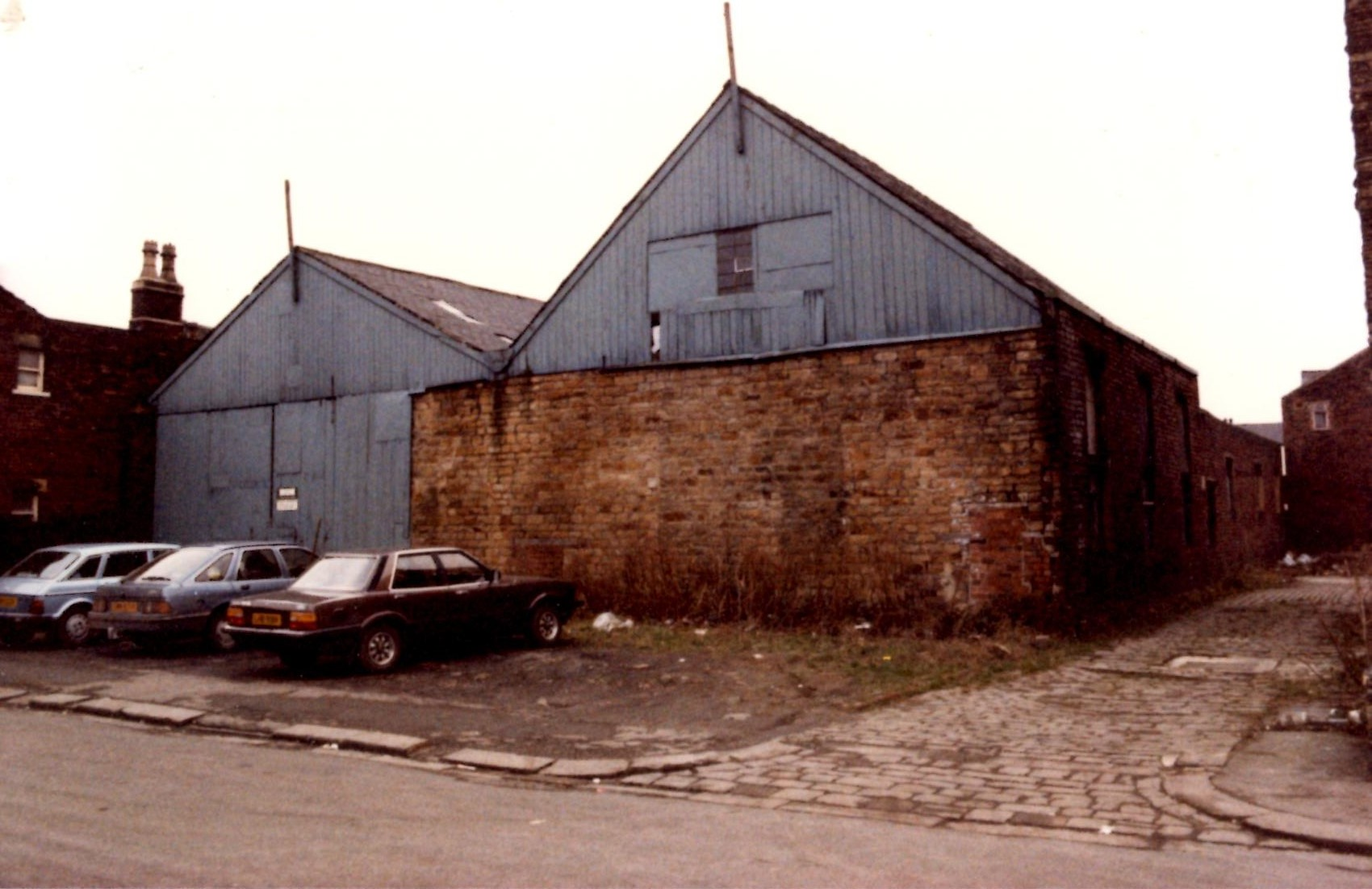
Ravensthorpe depot c. 1987

Prior to the redevelopment of the site in the late 1980s, there had been a small depot on the site belonging to the Yorkshire Woollen District Transport Company of Dewsbury since the 1930s. In later years, it had been used to store de-licensed coaches during the winter but by the early 1980s, it had fallen into disrepair and out of use until it was offered for sale to the West Riding Omnibus Preservation Society (WROPS) for the storage of their collection of preserved buses and coaches.

WROPS formed the West Riding Omnibus Museum Trust to purchase the building and used it until its condition deteriorated further when it was demolished and the current structure erected.
