= Guy Wulfrunian =

Front-engined double-decker bus chassis

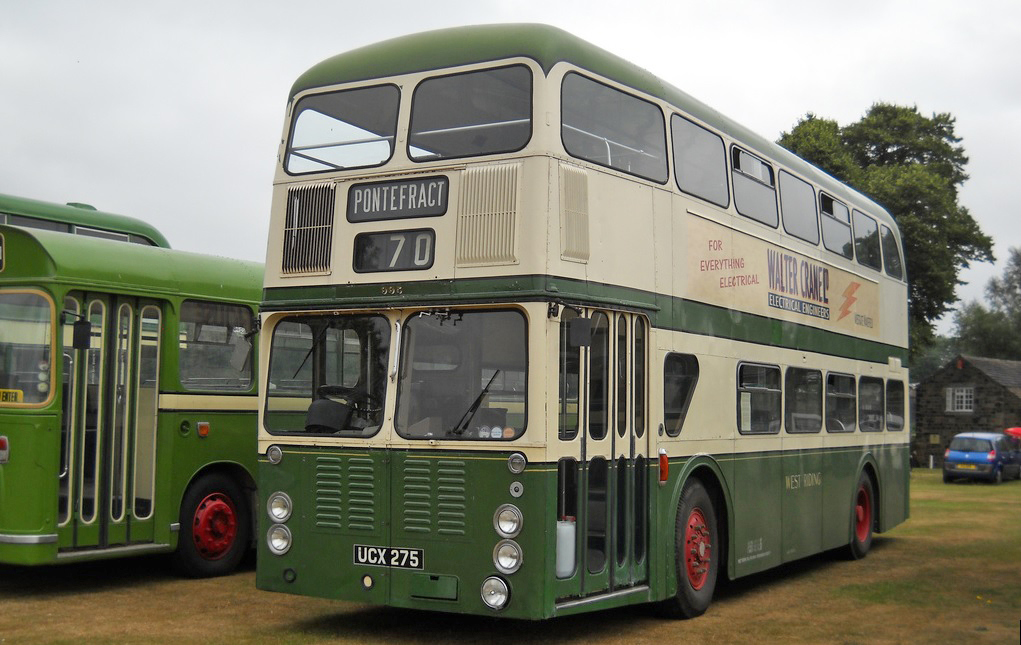
- Preserved West Riding Automobile Company Roe bodied Guy Wulfrunian

Overview
- Manufacturer: Guy Motors
- Production: 1958–1965
- Assembly: Wolverhampton, Staffordshire, England

Body and chassis
- Doors: 1

Powertrain
- Engine: Gardner 6LW/6LX; Leyland O.600/O.680
- Power output: 112–150 brake horsepower (84–112 kW)
- Transmission: Self-Changing Gears four-speed automatic Self-Changing Gears semi-automatic ZF synchromesh

Dimensions
- Length: 30 feet (9.1 m)

The Guy Wulfrunian was a British front-engined double-decker bus chassis produced by Guy Motors from 1959 until its discontinuation in 1965.

== Design ==
The Wulfrunian was introduced at the Commercial Motor Show in 1958 as a "concept" vehicle designed for one-person operation without the need for a bus conductor; the name originates from Guy Motors' manufacturing base of Wolverhampton, itself partially named after Mercian noblewoman Wulfrun. The Wulfrunian was unusual, compared to the rear-engined Leyland Atlantean and the Daimler Fleetline, in that it featured a front entrance alongside a front engine, Girling disc brakes and an independent front suspension. The engine, a 10.45 L (2.30 imp gal; 2.76 US gal) Gardner 6LX, was mounted beside the driver, though Leyland O.600 and O.680 engines were also available as an option, and the front axle moved back to create space for the entrance. Radiators were mounted along the front of the upper deck, alongside a Cave-Brown-Cave heating and ventilation system.

In most of the Wulfrunians built, the staircase was situated on the nearside of the vehicle, immediately behind the entrance. To accommodate this, the four-piece folding entrance doors were of different sizes, with options also available for a rear entrance configuration. The nearside rearward ascending staircase gave the driver full view of the stairwell. In the lower deck, after the area taken up for the staircase, the first passenger seats faced rearwards.

The majority of vehicles were fitted with Charles H. Roe bodywork, with five additionally being bodied by East Lancashire Coachbuilders and one being bodied by Northern Counties for Lancashire United Transport. Two demonstrators were built with Roe bodies, 7800DA and 8072DA, both vehicles being painted in a yellow and black livery; 7800DA had six more seats than 8072DA, and the seating capacity of each vehicle was hidden in the registration number.

However, the use of so many untested features led to reliability issues, particularly with the brakes and suspension. The cost of developing the vehicle, combined with the lack of sales, led to enormous losses for Guy, who first went into receivership in 1961, before finally ceasing production for the UK bus market in 1969. Later, in 1974, the front-engined, front-entrance Volvo Ailsa B55 came onto the British bus market and was successful.

== Operators ==
Of 137 Wulfrunians built, 126 were delivered to the West Riding Automobile Company between 1960 and 1965. A further four were acquired second hand from other operators and put into service, while two demonstrator vehicles were acquired from Guy but were cannibalised for spares. After maintenance and reliability issues, West Riding cancelled an order for a further 25 vehicles.

Two Wulfrunians with East Lancashire bodies were delivered to Wolverhampton Corporation Transport, with a further two with rear-entrance bodies delivered to Accrington Corporation Transport, one was delivered to West Wales Motors of Tycroes with a Roe body, and one was delivered to Lancashire United Transport with a Northern Counties body between 1960 and 1961, but these did not lead to any further orders.

Two Wulfrunians were ordered for export to Hong Kong in 1961 by China Motor Bus, however this order was later cancelled.

== Preservation ==
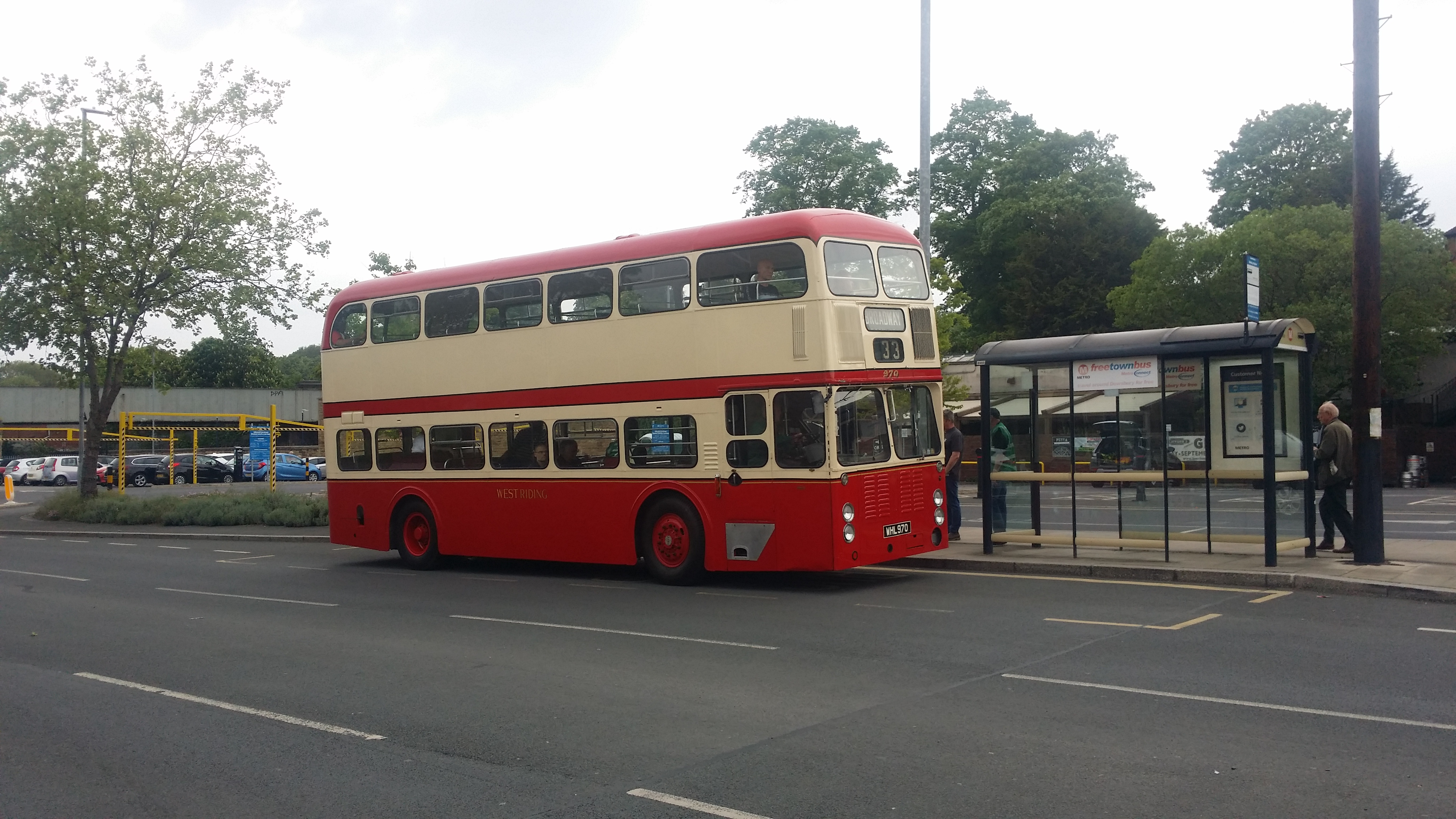
Preserved Roe-bodied Guy Wulfrunian in West Riding ex-tramways livery in May 2022

Only a small number of Wulfrunians were sold on for further service and one of these, WHL 970, the last West Riding Wulfrunian to be withdrawn from service on 4 March 1972, passed through several operators before being sold into preservation. This has been the subject of a thorough restoration into original West Riding red ex-tramway services livery at the Dewsbury Bus Museum, joining the only other survivor, UCX 275, back on the road in March 2022.

UCX 275 was new to County Motors of Lepton in 1961, staying with County Motors for only a year before passing to West Riding, where it was painted in conventional green fleet livery. Upon withdrawal in 1972, it passed straight into preservation with the West Riding Wulfrunian Preservation Society, which had been formed the previous year specifically to save a Wulfrunian.
