= West Riding Automobile Company =

Bus operator in Yorkshire, England

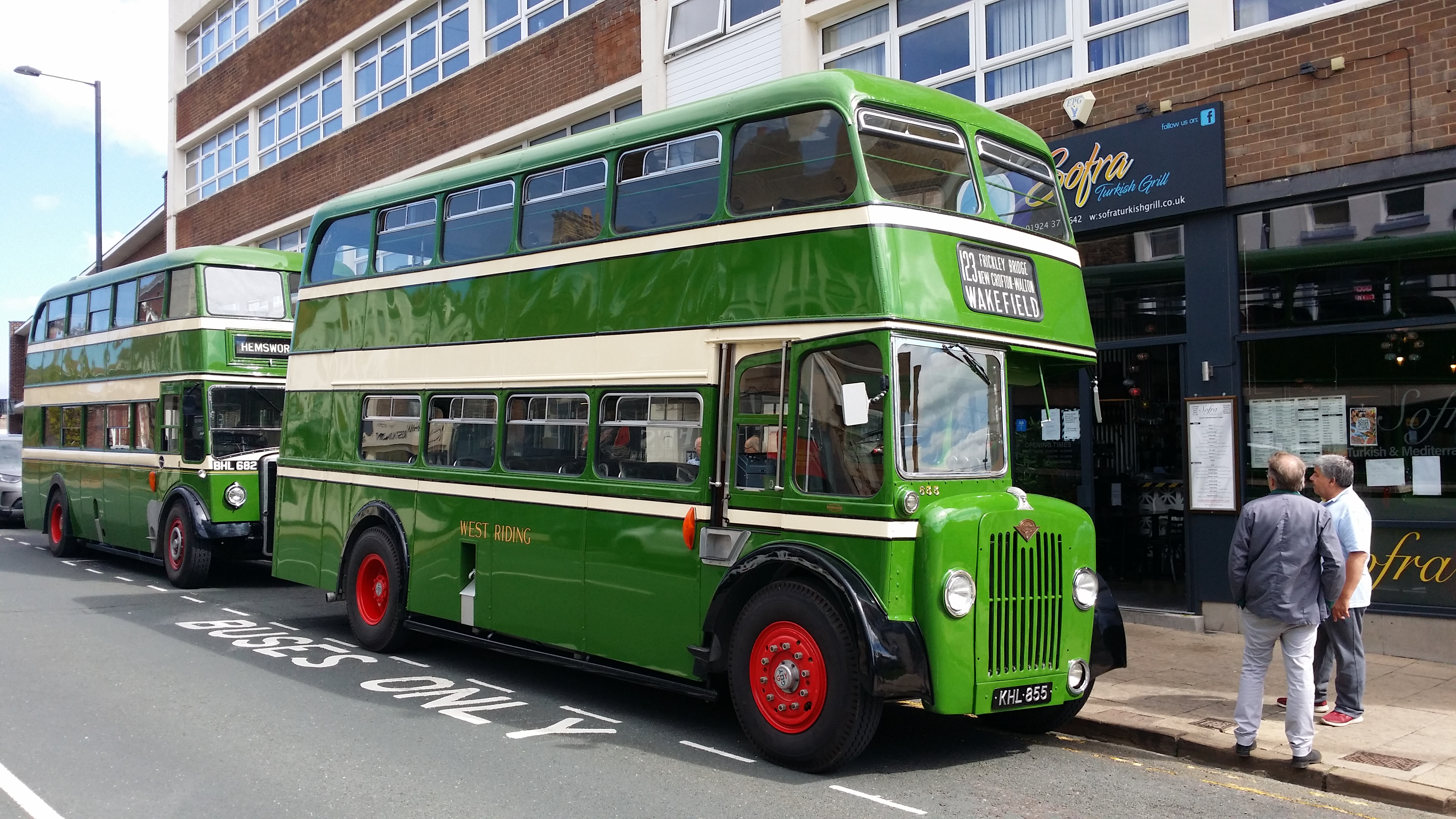
- Preserved Roe bodied Guy Arab in Wakefield town centre
- Founded: 16 November 1923; 102 years ago
- Ceased operation: November 1997; 28 years ago
- Headquarters: Wakefield, West Yorkshire, England
- Service area: West Yorkshire; North Yorkshire; South Yorkshire
- Service type: Bus and coach
- Fleet: 425 (January 1987)

The West Riding Automobile Company was a bus operator running services in West Yorkshire and parts of North and South Yorkshire between 1923 and 1998.

== History ==
=== Tramway subsidiary ===
The Yorkshire (West Riding) Electric Tramways Company was founded on 4 April 1905 to operate electric tramway services in towns within the West Riding of Yorkshire. The majority of its operations were concentrated in Wakefield, where the Wakefield and District Light Railway Company had been taken over by Yorkshire (West Riding), with an additional line linking Normanton with Castleford and Pontefract opening on 29 October 1906. The Wakefield and Castleford tramway networks remained isolated from one another, with proposed extensions of the networks of both towns not materialising.

By the early 1920s, a decline in the use and feasibility of tramways resulting in Yorkshire (West Riding) purchasing 22 Bristol 4-ton motorbuses at a cost of £30,000 (equivalent to £1,474,000 in 2025) and proposing to run services in Wakefield and Castleford. Bus services commenced in April 1922, with a further 13 Bristols ordered for delivery in the new year. On 16 November 1923, the West Riding Automobile Company was registered as a subsidiary of Yorkshire (West Riding), who transferred its Wakefield and Castleford motorbus operations to the new company. The speed of changeover from tramways to motorbuses resulted in Castleford's tramway system being abandoned on 1 November 1925.

After being threatened with closure and re-amalgamation back into the parent tramways company in 1933, as the last Yorkshire (West Riding) trams were withdrawn in the summer of 1925, the West Riding Automobile Company was placed into voluntary liquidation and officially wound up on 30 June 1925, with Yorkshire (West Riding) Electric Tramways Company changing its name to West Riding Automobile Company a day later on 1 July.

=== Bus operations ===
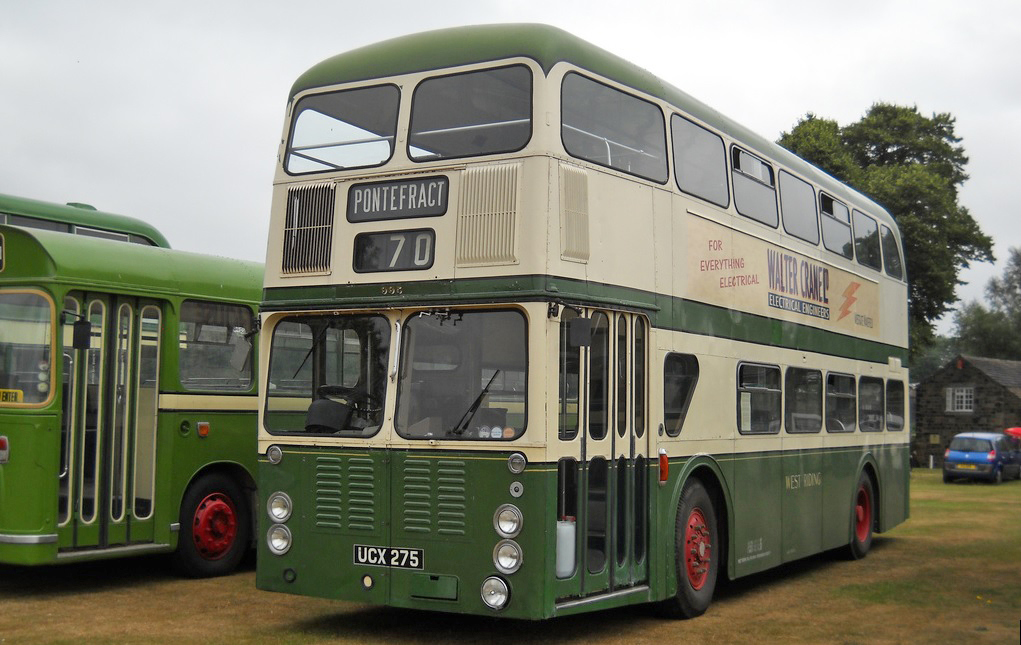
Preserved Roe bodied Guy Wulfrunian, one of two to still exist, attending a bus rally

The company purchased rival independent operator J. Bullock & Sons of Featherstone in July 1950, taking on 160 buses and coaches to double the size of its fleet to over 450 and also expanding West Riding's operating area to incorporate services to Bradford, Doncaster, Goole, Huddersfield, Leeds, Selby, Sheffield and York. In 1952, West Riding funded the construction of Wakefield bus station close to the Bull Ring at a cost of £60,000 (equivalent to £1,503,000 in 2025). By the mid-1950s, the company was the largest independently-owned British bus and coach operator.

In October 1967, West Riding was acquired by the state-owned Transport Holding Company for £1.6 million (equivalent to £25,495,000 in 2025), which, with the passage of the Transport Act 1968, became part of the National Bus Company (NBC) on 1 January 1969. That same day, West Riding launched Yorkshire's first express motorway coach service, running between Wakefield and Leeds via the M1 motorway, using a fleet of Plaxton Supreme bodied Leyland Leopard coaches.

A consolidation of the NBC's West Yorkshire subsidiaries in 1971 saw West Riding's operations amalgamated with those of former British Electric Traction subsidiary Yorkshire Woollen and former independent bus and coach operator Hebble Motor Services, forming the 'West Riding Group'. Each company retained their separate fleetnames, although Hebble's bus services were redistributed between West Riding and Yorkshire Woollen, with the name falling out of use after Hebble's remaining coach services were transferred to National Travel East.

Shortly after local government reorganisation in 1974 saw the formation of the metropolitan county of West Yorkshire, the newly formed West Yorkshire Passenger Transport Executive (WYPTE, also known as 'Metro') attempted to purchase the West Riding Group, the West Yorkshire Road Car Company and a part of Yorkshire Traction from the NBC. However the latter refused to enter negotiations to sell its subsidiaries, with both parties instead negotiating to form a joint management company aimed at integrating both NBC and WYPTE bus services. This resulted in the formation of the 'Metro-National Transport Company Ltd' in October 1977, an integrated transport network jointly managed by WYPTE and the NBC. West Riding Group buses remained in the NBC's corporate 'Poppy Red' livery with additional 'MetroBus' logos until the network's abolition by the PTE in 1984.

==== Deregulation ====
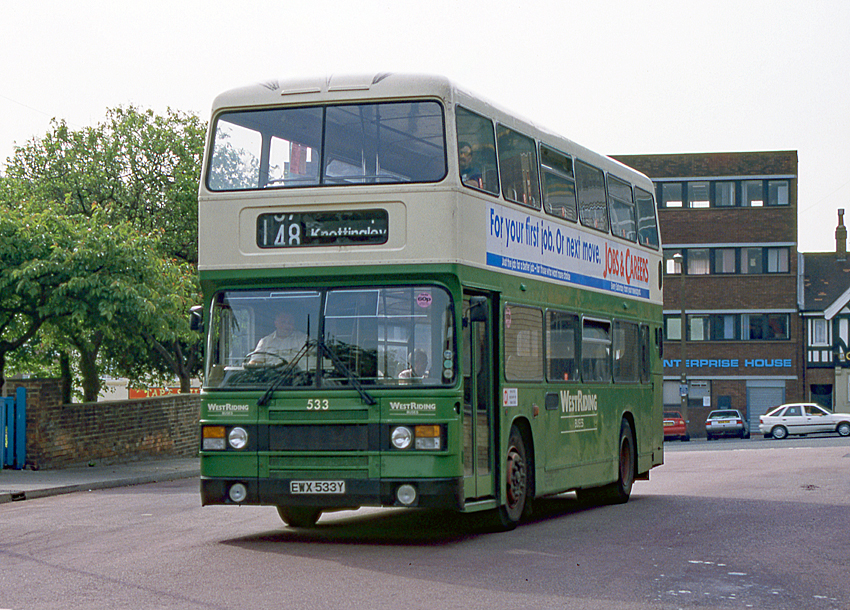
ECW bodied Leyland Olympian at Pontefract bus station in June 1996

As part of the privatisation of the NBC, the West Riding Group was sold in January 1987 to Caldaire Holdings, an off-the-shelf company formed by members of the group's management. National Travel East, the group's coaching arm, was additionally sold to ATL Holdings and renamed NTE Coaches.

West Riding entered into a cross-county bus war against dominant South Yorkshire operator and 'arm's length' former PTE company South Yorkshire Transport (SYT), running competing minibuses in Sheffield under the Sheffield & District name. SYT responded to West Riding in 1988 by forming Compass Bus, a new Wakefield subsidiary which competed with West Riding using its own minibus fleet as well as vehicles cascaded from SYT. An agreement was eventually reached between West Riding and SYT for both operators to pull out of Sheffield and Wakefield respectively in September 1989, with SYT taking over Sheffield & District and maintaining it as a low-cost subsidiary.

In July 1994, the Caldaire Group purchased long-established Pontefract independent South Yorkshire Road Transport, amalgamating it into the West Riding Group while maintaining its separate identity.

In 1995, Caldaire was sold to British Bus, which in turn passed to the Cowie Group on 1 August 1996. A year later in November 1997, Cowie rebranded to Arriva and adopted a corporate aquamarine and cream livery, with the West Riding Group rebranding all operations to Arriva Yorkshire.

== Fleet ==
As of January 1987, West Riding and Yorkshire Woollen jointly operated a fleet of 425 buses and coaches.

The West Riding Company used a variety of vehicles, including those produced by Guy, Bristol, AEC and Daimler, although in later years it tended to prefer those produced by Leyland. The company was involved in the development of the Guy Wulfrunian from 1959 onwards, and purchased 126 of the 137 vehicles produced, acquiring a further six secondhand.
