= Guy Motors =

British motor vehicle manufacturer, 1914–1982

Guy Motors Limited
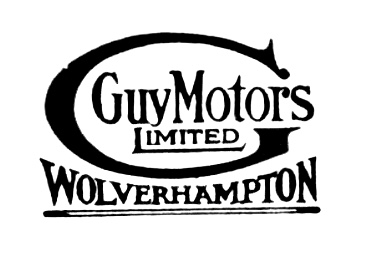
- Type: Private
- Industry: Automotive
- Founded: 1914
- Founder: Sydney Guy
- Defunct: 1982
- Headquarters: Fallings Park, England
- Products: Buses; Cars; Trolleybuses; Trucks

Guy Motors was a Wolverhampton, England based vehicle manufacturer that produced buses, cars, trolleybuses and trucks from 1914 until 1982.

== History ==
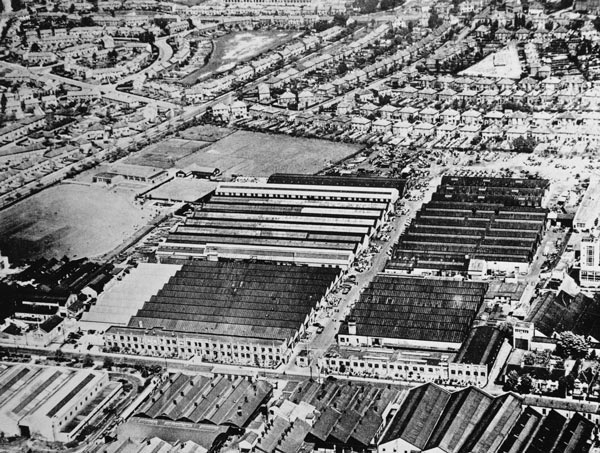
An aerial view of Guy Motors' Fallings Park factory

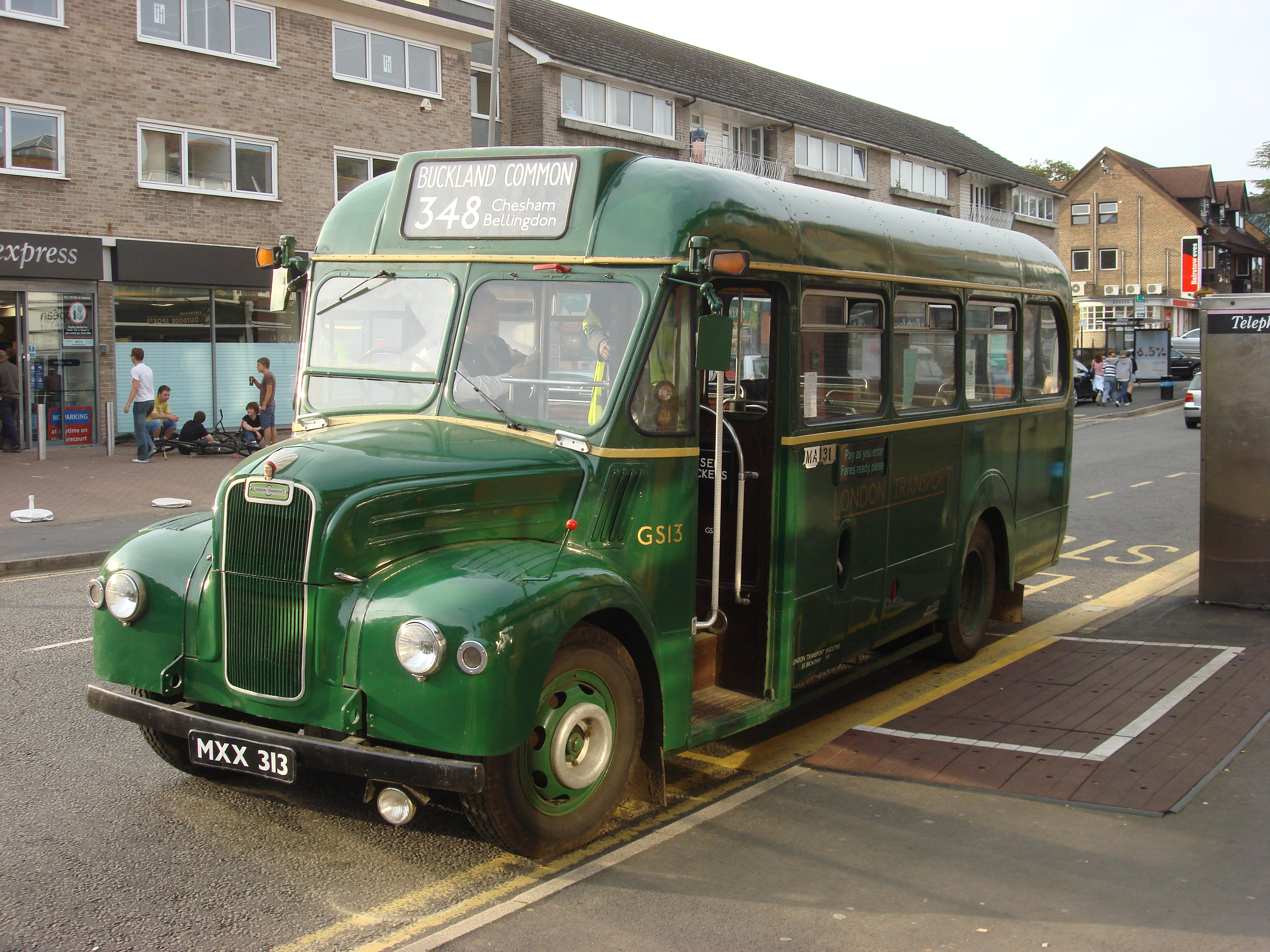
1953 Guy GS bus built for London Transport

=== Foundation and the First World War ===
Sydney Guy registered Guy Motors Limited on 30 May 1914, the same day he departed his position as works manager at Sunbeam. A factory was built on the site at Fallings Park, Wolverhampton. and by September 1914 production was under way on the newly designed 30 cwt lorry. This employed a much lighter form of pressed steel frame, unlike the more commonly used heavy rolled steel channel frames of the time. This made the vehicle able to cross difficult terrain and a 14-seat post bus built based on the design was used for crossing the Scottish Highlands.

In 1915 Guy Motors came under control of the Ministry of Munitions and production was focussed on the war effort. In spite of the wartime situation, Guy brought out a revised version of their 30cwt lorry in May 1915, with the engine (made by White & Poppe) and transmission mounted on a separate subframe from the main body. A year later they revealed their new 2-ton model, this time powered by a Tylor JB4 engine (a type approved by the War Office and in use on wartime trucks by Karrier and AEC). They also produced Wasp and Dragonfly radial aircraft engines, Tylor truck engines and Maudslay gearboxes as well as being the country's largest maker of depth charge fuses. For their efforts during the war Guy received a commendation from William Weir, Secretary of State for Air. Due to orders from the ministry Guy prospered during the war, expanding its factory and became an established name in British manufacturing.

In 1917 Sydney Guy applied for two patents relating to modified valve gear, one of these outlining how it could be used in a V8 engine, and in 1919 he launched a new version of his 2-ton truck with an engine using this valve gear, and he started production of his first car, a luxury 4 litre V8, the first British V8 engine. The Guy cars were produced in a separate works and in relatively small numbers, whereas £70,000 was invested in the main factory in 1919 with the aim of increasing production to 40 to 50 2-ton trucks per week.

=== 1920s ===
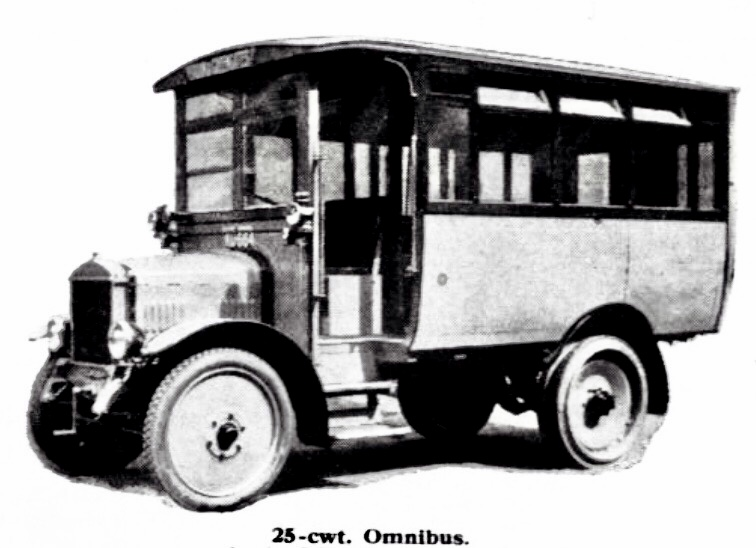
Guy Motors bus

Guy Motors were one of the first companies to get back to commercial vehicle production after the war, and in March 1920 they were expanding the buildings and plant on their 60-acre site, and had £2.5 million in orders. However, the Interwar period was to prove difficult for the motor industry as military contracts were cancelled and military vehicles no longer required for service were sold onto the market at low prices. The Guy 4 litre 8-cylinder "Open Tourer" car was joined by a smaller model in 1921, the "Guy Saloon Car" with the 2465 cc four-cylinder 16.9 hp. A cheaper model followed in 1924 with the 1954 cc 13/36 with an engine from Coventry Climax. There is some uncertainty regarding the number of these cars made, but it is generally agreed it was in the 100s rather than thousands.

The main commercial interest of Guy Motors was production of the commercial chassis and engine ready for a variety of bodies to be fitted. This was available in different wheelbases and was used both for trucks and for buses, and still used the separate subframe to mount the engine and transmission as had been developed during World War I. At the commercial show at Olympia in October 1920 two examples were shown, one having a single decker Mulliner bus body seating 28, the other with shorter wheelbase, but otherwise identical chassis and engine, having a 2.5 ton tipper wagon body.

In 1924, the company adopted the slogan 'Feathers in our Cap' which led to the addition of a Native American mascot to their vehicles. In 1924, Guy produced the first-ever dropped-frame chassis for passenger vehicles (the B-type). This design allowed passengers to enter buses in a single step and became extremely popular, Guy receiving an order for 170 from Rio de Janeiro alone.

Growing populations in towns and cities meant larger capacity buses were a necessity, leading Guy to develop a 6-wheeled version of their dropped-frame chassis, which allowed for the introduction of the first 6-wheeled double decker buses and 6-wheeled trolleybuses in 1926. Owen Silvers, the general manager of Wolverhampton Corporation, had pushed Guys to develop the 3-axle bus, and took delivery of the first production vehicle. He then convinced Guys to work with W. A. Stevens, who had developed the Tilling-Stevens petrol-electric bus, of which Wolverhampton had several, and Rees Roturbo Co Ltd, who were also based in Wolverhampton, on the design of a trolleybus. Guys modified their 3-axle chassis, fitting a single 60 hp (45 kW) Rees-Stevens electric motor at the front of the chassis. Rees Roturbo produced the regenerative control system. The first BTX vehicle, with an open rear staircase, was tested on the Wolverhampton system in December 1926, and Silvers placed an order for a further 58, with enclosed staircases. The Hastings Tramway Co ordered 50 single-deck BTX trolleybuses and eight open-top double-deck versions, while Rotherham ordered five. Guy double decker buses and trolleybuses would prove popular, with a fleet of double deckers sold to the London Public Omnibus Company and exports supplied all around the world. Exports served as a major source of income for Guy with sales to South Africa, Pakistan, India and the Netherlands, their armoured vehicles proving particularly popular for covering difficult terrain, with 100 supplied to the Indian government in 1928.

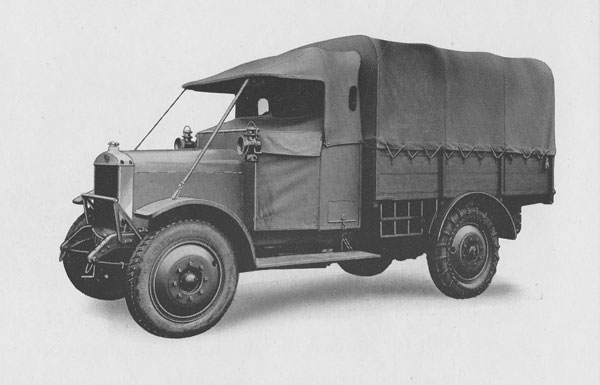
Guy's first military vehicle produced in 1923

In 1928, Guy took control of fellow Wolverhampton manufacturer the Star Motor Company, who had seen declining sales throughout the decade, in an attempt to expand their luxury car manufacturing. Under Guy, Star Motors moved to a new factory in Bushbury and the range of vehicles was narrowed to prevent competition against itself. Despite this, Star continued to struggle and a loss was made on every car sold. The Wall Street crash had a crippling effect on industry and the subsequent recession meant that Guy could no longer afford to fit out Star's Bushbury plant and, in 1932, that company entered receivership.

Despite performing well throughout the decade, by the end of the 1920s Guy was facing an uncertain future, due to the expensive takeover of Star and the Wall Street Crash, which had seen its share prices fall from one pound to one shilling (5p).

=== 1930s ===
Guy was able to endure the Depression due to orders from the War Office and by taking advantage of the 1930 Road Traffic Act which encouraged the development of lighter vehicles. They produced a 2-axle version of the BTX trolleybus, known as the BT model, in 1930, which was available with a 26-foot (7.9 m) double deck body, or a 27-foot (8.2 m) single deck body, and also produced some 23-foot (7.0 m) chassis for export to Delhi. In 1933, the Arab bus chassis, designed for use with diesel engines, was launched and would prove a mainstay of Guy's success for the next 20 years.

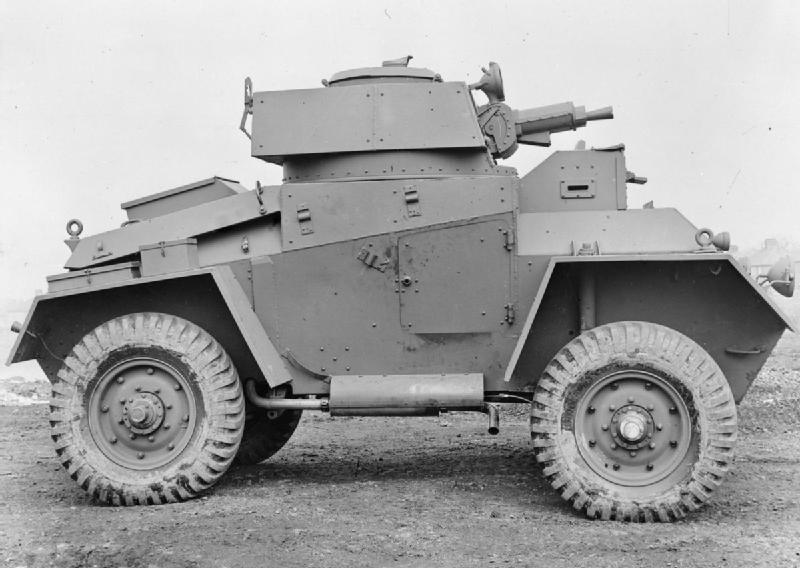
Guy armoured car

From the mid-1930s, the company became increasingly involved in the British re-armament programme, developing and producing military vehicles. In 1935, Guy submitted their new four-wheel Guy Ant 15 cwt truck to military trials, where it impressed so much that 150 were ordered by the government. After this success, Guy began to concentrate solely on the production of military vehicles and, by 1938, Guy relied exclusively on government contracts and had ended civilian production. The Ant was followed by a four wheel drive version - the Quad Ant - for use as an artillery tractor. During this time, Guy designed a new armoured car, based on the Quad Ant; the Guy armoured car was welded rather than rivetted together. The original official contract specified that it had to be designed as a rivetted vehicle, but Guy had suggested welding as being more suitable and effective. To that end, they developed the necessary techniques, including rotating jigs, which meant that the bodies and turrets could be produced more quickly and cheaply. (Note: Landsverk had successfully pioneered an armour plate welding technique for use in their tanks and other vehicles back in the 1920s. However, it was not in widespread usage, partly due to cost.) This new development made armoured vehicles much safer and is reported to have eventually saved the British government £100 million pounds, earning Guy a commendation from the Royal Commission. Initially though, the government's technical advisors were sceptical that welding armour plate, using these techniques, would be economical, so Guy offered to weld the first batch ordered, and if unsuccessful, to stand the cost. The vehicles were welded, and on examination by the British Army, the welding was found to have worked extremely well. By the time World War II started, Guys had built a total of 376 trolleybus chassis, but manufacture was then suspended until 1947.

=== Second World War ===
Guy armoured vehicles were used throughout the war, featuring prominently at the evacuation of Dunkirk and in the North African campaign. The Guy armoured car design was given to Karrier who produced the Humber armoured car from the Guy body and turrets on Karrier's own chassis. The factory was still involved in the war-effort, producing anti-aircraft guns.

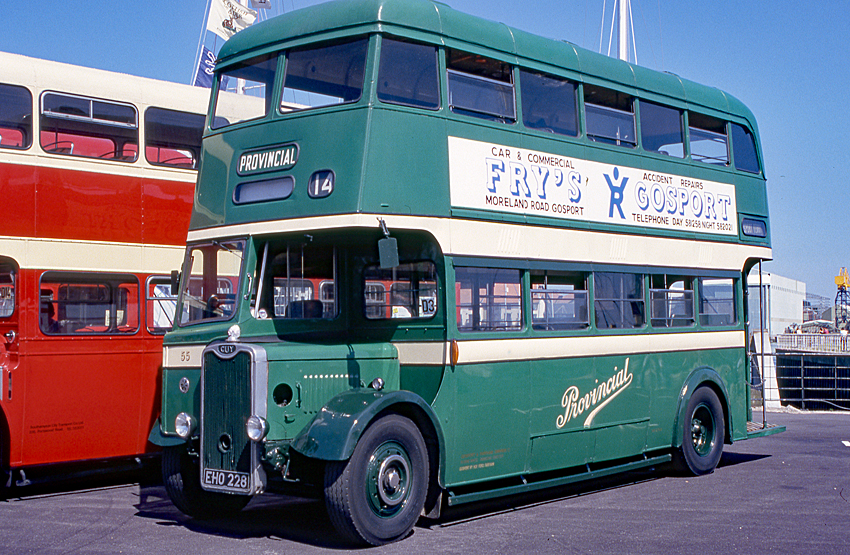
Provincial wartime utility Guy Arab II in Southampton

Car and commercial vehicle production in the UK virtually ceased during the war and buses were wearing out, being damaged and destroyed. The Ministry of War Transport was forced to arrange the production of buses/trolleybuses to maintain public services. It approached Guy to produce the first of more than 2,000 Guy double-deck buses which entered service between 1942 and 1945. The Ministry of War Supply ordered Guy to produce a chassis suitable for double-deck buses, the Blitz having resulted in a shortage of buses. In 1942, Guy launched the Arab I, then Arab II utility double deck bus, based on their original 1933 design, but with a frame of identical shape to the Leyland Titan TD8. Parts originally made of aluminium and other parts essential for the war effort were replaced by steel and iron. It was immediately successful, due to its robustness, reliability and low running costs. The company's contribution to the war effort established it as a leading supplier for the government and meant financial stability when heading into the post-war years.

=== Post-war years ===
After the war, Guy returned to civilian production, with bus production remaining a mainstay and retaining a strong emphasis on export sales to their major markets, including South Africa, Pakistan and the Netherlands. In 1947, Guy received orders for 70 BTX 30-foot (9.1 m) from Belfast, which were fitted with electrical equipment by GEC, and 50 BT 26-foot (7.9 m) models for Wolverhampton, which carried BTH electrical equipment. Guy had by then built 496 trolleybus chassis, but in 1948, they acquired Sunbeam Commercial Vehicles and from then on, all trolleybuses produced (except some for UK operators carrying Karrier badges) carried the Sunbeam name. Trolleybuses continued to sell well, with the Sunbeam becoming the most popular model in South Africa.

In 1950 Guy motors signed an agreement with Mahindra & Mahindra of Mumbai, India a multinational automobile manufacturer to assemble their vehicles in India and also represent Guy motors throughout India and also share workforce between the two companies.

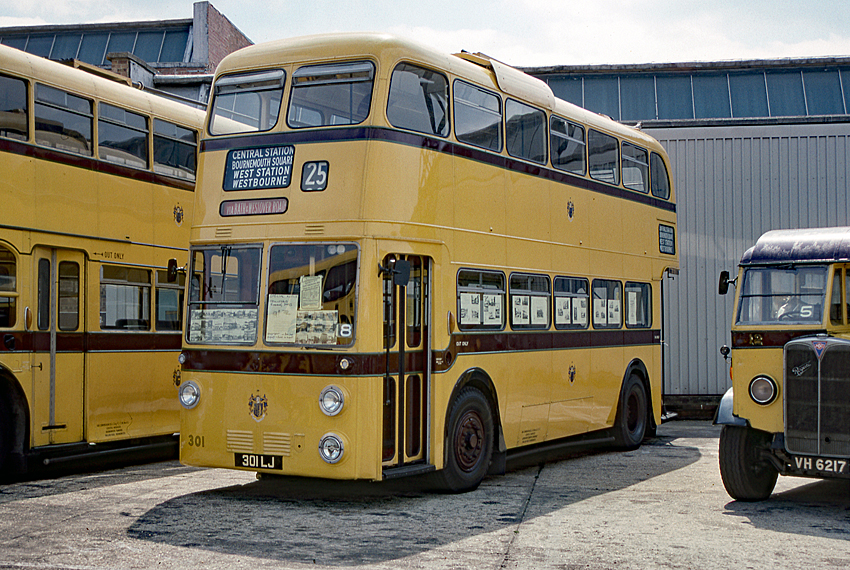
Bournemouth Sunbeam MF2B trolleybus

Sunbeam trolleybuses had been built at Sunbeam's Moorfields Works, enabling Guy to concentrate on motorbuses and lorries at their Fallings Park Works, but in 1953 they completed the construction of new assembly shops next to their existing works, and Moorfields Works was closed, with trolleybus production moving to Fallings Park. Guy continued to update their old models, introducing a new version of the Otter chassis in 1950 for 30-seater vehicles and 84 were ordered by London Transport. By 1954, Guy passenger vehicles were operated by 150 companies in the UK and in 26 countries abroad. The company developed the first 30-foot (9.1 m) two-axle double-deck trolleybus chassis in 1954, the Sunbeam F4A, which could seat 68 passengers.

In 1957, Sydney Guy retired after 43 years with the company. Guy continued to develop new and very successful models of chassis, introducing updated versions of the Otter and Warrior models and the high performance Victory chassis. However, an ill-advised decision to take South African sales in-house, which involved leasing the vehicles, rather than outright sales, proved an extreme strain on the company's finances, as there were many defaulting contracts. This, combined with their new double-decker chassis, the Guy Wulfrunian, would prove highly damaging for Guy's future. Launched in 1958, the Wulfrunian included many innovations in its design, but, crucially, lacked the thorough testing necessary before marketing it, resulting in it failing to deliver the reliability upon which Guy had built its name.

=== Decline of the company ===
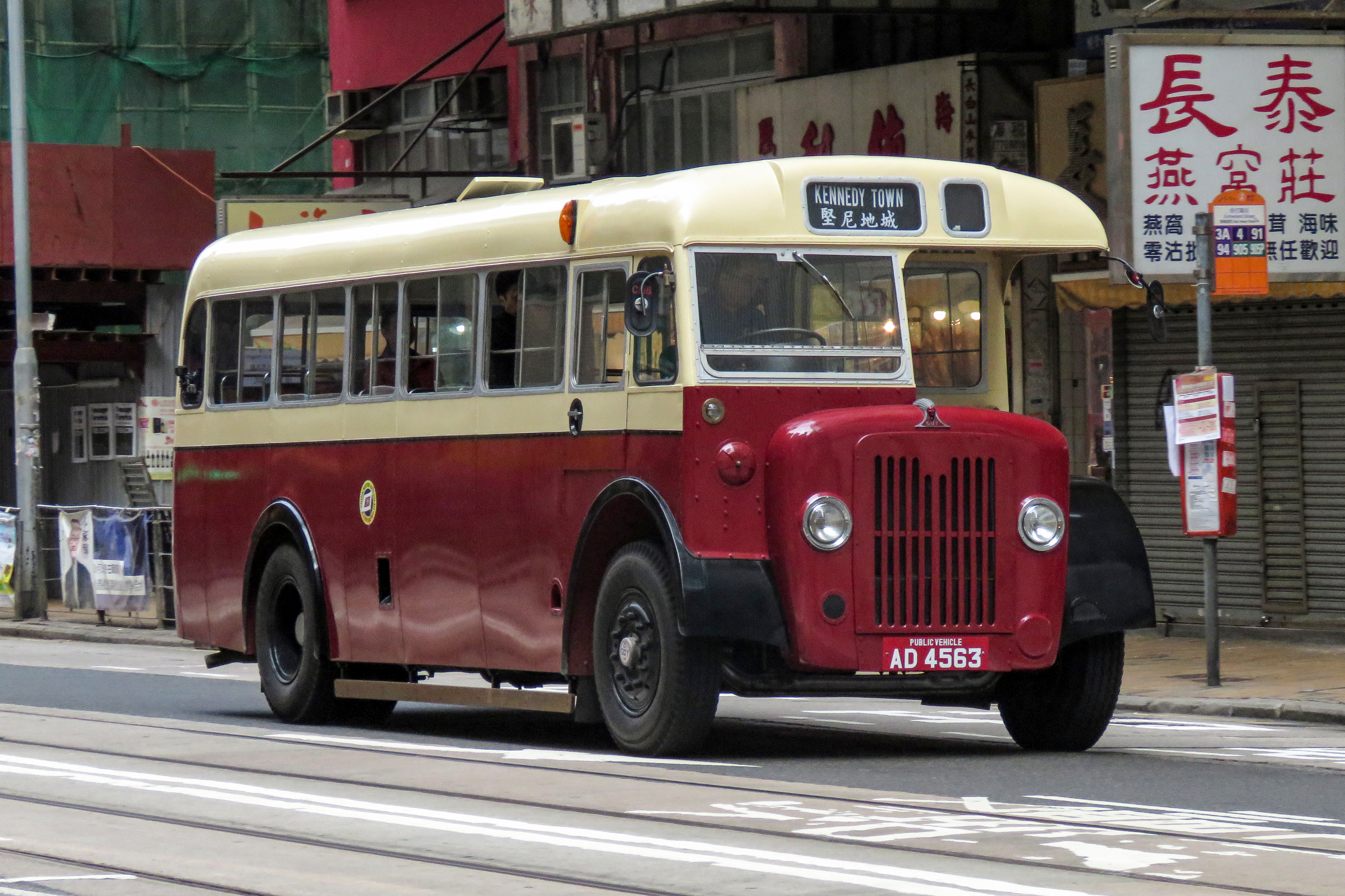
A preserved Guy Arab V (1963) in Hong Kong, previously owned by China Motor Bus

Although new designs such as the Warrior Mark II were being produced and despite the fact that their lorry division was performing well, by 1960, Guy faced seemingly insurmountable financial problems. The failure of the Wulfrunian was a commercial disaster and the operation in South Africa was losing them £300,000 a year.

By 1961, Guy had no choice but to enter receivership. William Lyons, managing director of Jaguar, acquired the company for £800,000. Jaguar immediately set about rationalisation, reducing both the number of employees and the range of vehicles in production.

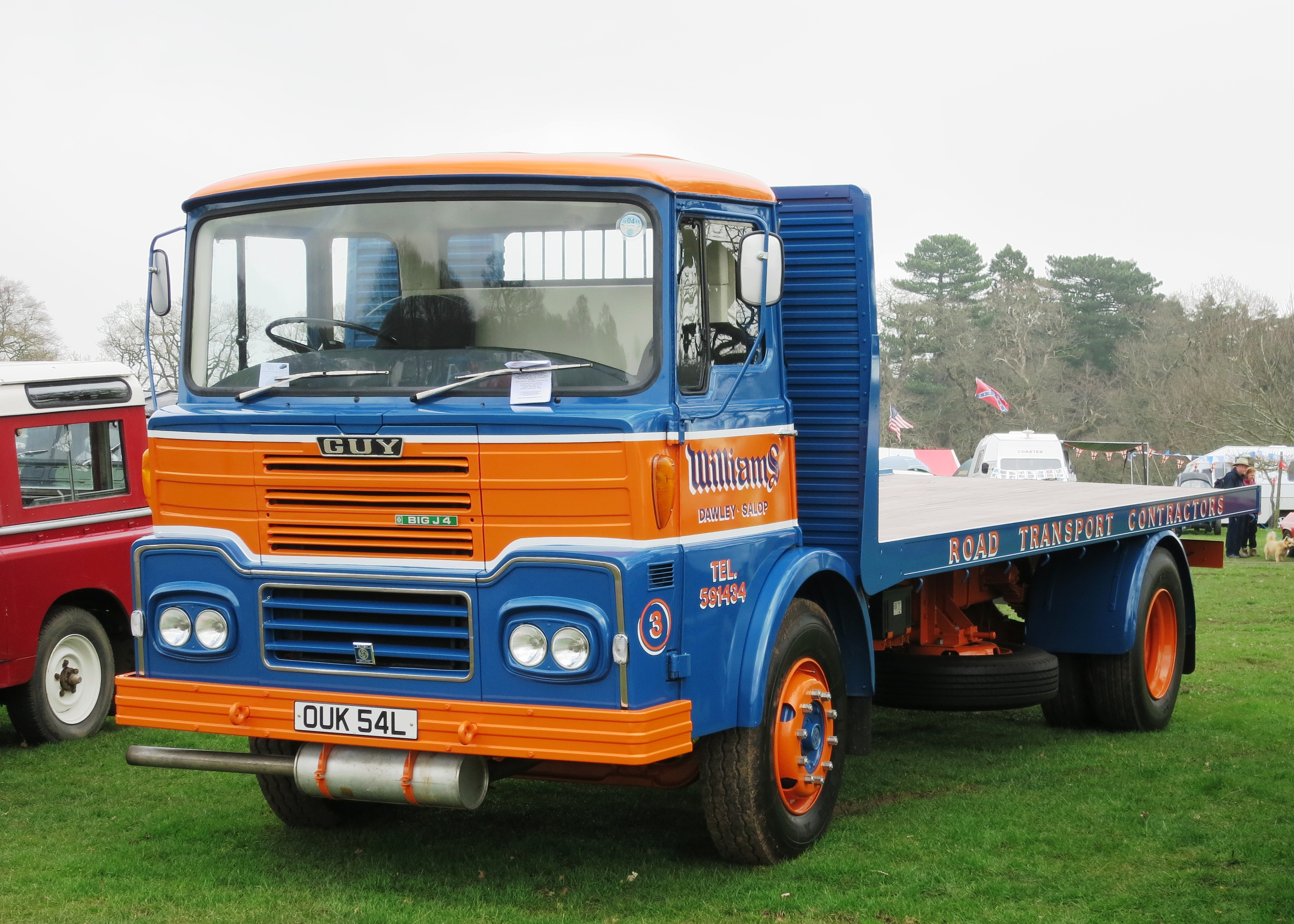
Guy Big J4 (1972)

Guy continued to be successful throughout the 1960s, with the development of the Victory trambus and the Big J series of trucks. The Big J was designed around a new, high-revving Cummins V6-200 engine coupled to a 12-speed splitter-type gearbox, and was intended for motorway operation. The reliability shortcomings and poor fuel economy of the Cummins V6-200 engine soon saw it replaced by engines from other sources. For example, AEC AV505, Leyland O.401, Gardner 6LXB, Cummins NH180/NTK265 and Rolls-Royce Eagle 220/265 were popular choices dependent on Gross Vehicle Weight. Gearboxes were sourced from AEC, David Brown and Fuller. Rear axles were selectable from ENV and Kirkstall Forge offerings. Such were the permutation of fitments that each vehicle's configuration was recorded on an "Erection Sheet" which, in the pre-internet age, was mailed from the factory to Guy dealers to have a record of each vehicle that may require attention in his workshop. The distinctive, non-tilt cab was sourced from Motor Panels.

However a series of mergers by their parent company had left them in a precarious situation In 1966, Jaguar had merged with the British Motor Corporation to form British Motor Holdings. (Note: BMC had bought Pressed Steel, the manufacturer of Jaguars monocoque car bodies leaving Jaguar exposed to possible supply issues) This company had then merged with Leyland Motors (manufacturer of trucks, buses and cars) in 1968, to form the British Leyland Motor Corporation. Leyland ceased the production of Guy-badged buses in 1972, although Leyland-badged versions of the Guy Victory were produced at Wolverhampton and Leyland until 1986. Despite the mergers, the British motor industry continued on a generally downward trend and British Leyland looked for where it could make savings.

Guy Motors was able to postpone closure, in part due to the success of its Big J range, because it was one of the few companies owned by British Leyland operating at a profit. Nevertheless, in 1981, Leyland took the debatable decision to close the Fallings Park plant, as part of a rationalisation drive and, in August 1982, the doors were shut at the cost of 740 jobs. On 5 October, the factory was stripped clean and the contents auctioned off. The closure of Guy Motors had a devastating effect on the factory's neighbouring areas, including Heath Town and Low Hill, where many of the company's workers lived, contributing to a rise in the already high unemployment in these areas.

== Products ==
=== Cars ===
- 20 hp 1919–1923
- 16.9 hp 1922–1924
- 13/36 1924–1925

=== Buses/trolleybuses ===
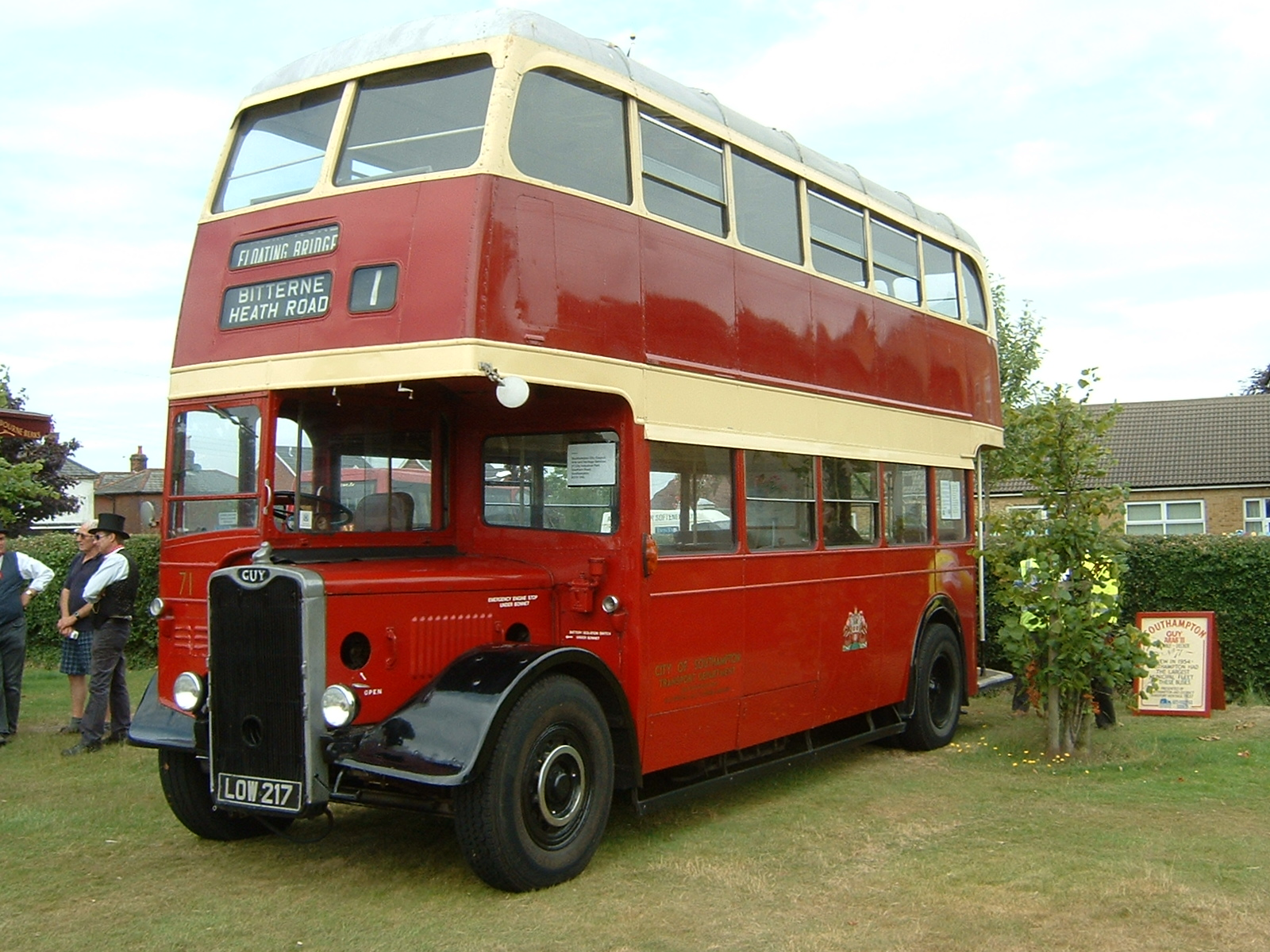
1954 Southampton Corporation Transport Guy Arab III omnibus

- B series (including BT 2-axle and BTX 3-axle trolleybuses)
- C series
- Arab Mk I/II/III/IV/V
- Arab UF/LUF
- Wolf
- Vixen
- Warrior Trambus
- Wulfrunian
- Victory
- Sunbeam/Karrier S7/S7A – 3-axle 30-foot (9.1 m) and 33-foot (10 m) double-deck trolleybuses
- Sunbeam/Karrier F4/ F4A – 2-axle 26-foot (7.9 m), 27-foot (8.2 m) and 30-foot (9.1 m) double-deck trolleybuses
- Sunbeam MF2B – trolleybus chassis available in various lengths up to 36 feet (11 m) intended for export, but some supplied to Bournemouth and Hull

=== Trucks/others ===
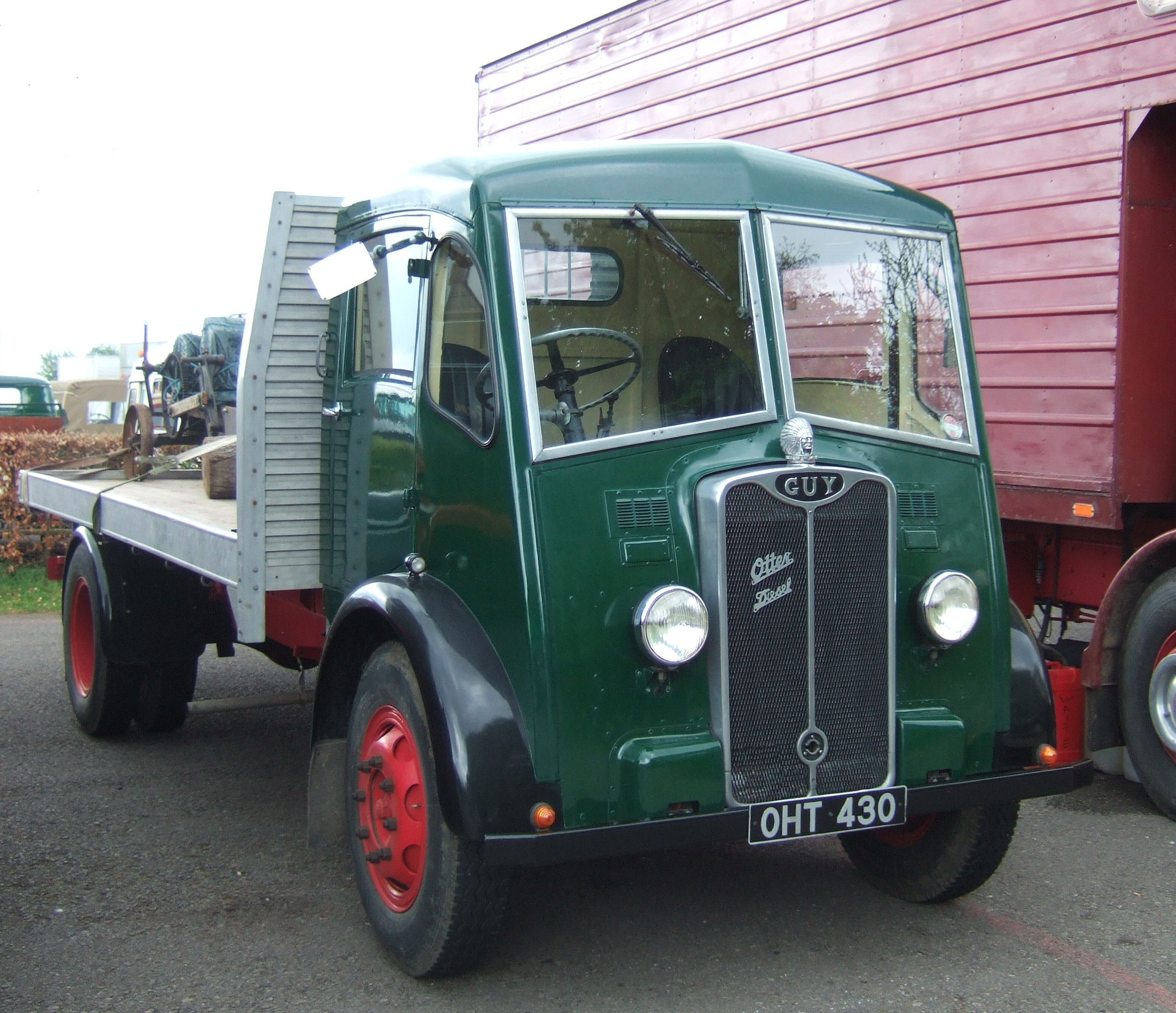
Guy Otter

- Armoured car
- Lizard – armoured command vehicle
- FBAX – truck 3/5 ton 6 x 4, general service, searchlight, machinery, wireless, breakdown gantry, derrick
- Ant – truck 15 cwt 4 x 2, general service (GS) & wireless (house type)
- Quad-Ant – truck 4 × 4 field artillery tractor (FAT) and 15-cwt GS
- Wolf
- Vixen
- Warrior (1956)
- Invincible
- Big J (1964–78)
- Otter

== See also ==
- List of car manufacturers of the United Kingdom
