= List of Leyland buses =

This is a list of all known passenger chassis and integral bus vehicles manufactured by Leyland Motors and Leyland Bus from 1919 until closure.

== 1919 - 1925 ==
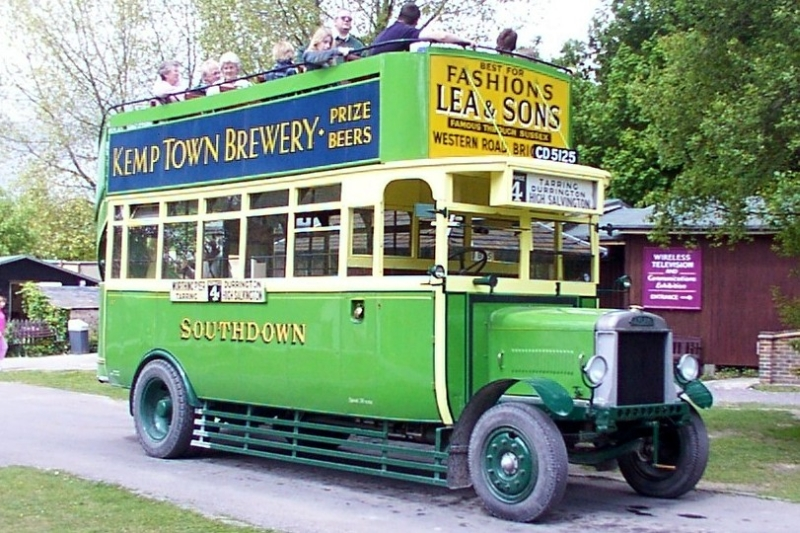
Leyland Type N bus

- A1, A5, A7, A9, A11, A13 - 1920-1926
- B - 1919-1920
- C, C1, C5, C7, C9 - 1919-1926
- D - 1920-1924
- E - 1919-1920
- F - 1919
- G, G1, G2, G3, G4, G5, G6, G7, G8 - 1919-1924
- H - 1919-1920
- J - 1919-1920
- K - 1919
- L - 1919-1920
- M, M1 - 1919-1921
- N - 1919-1921
- O, O1 - 1919-1921
- RAF - 1919-1925
- SG2, SG4, SG6, SG7, SG9, SG11 - 1923-1926
- GH2, GH4, GH5, GH7, GH8 - 1923-1926
- OP2 - 1921-1924
- OH2 - 1923-1926
- LB2, LB4, LB5 - 1922-1926
- Z3, Z4, Z5, Z6, Z7 - 1923-1926

== 1925 - 1942 ==
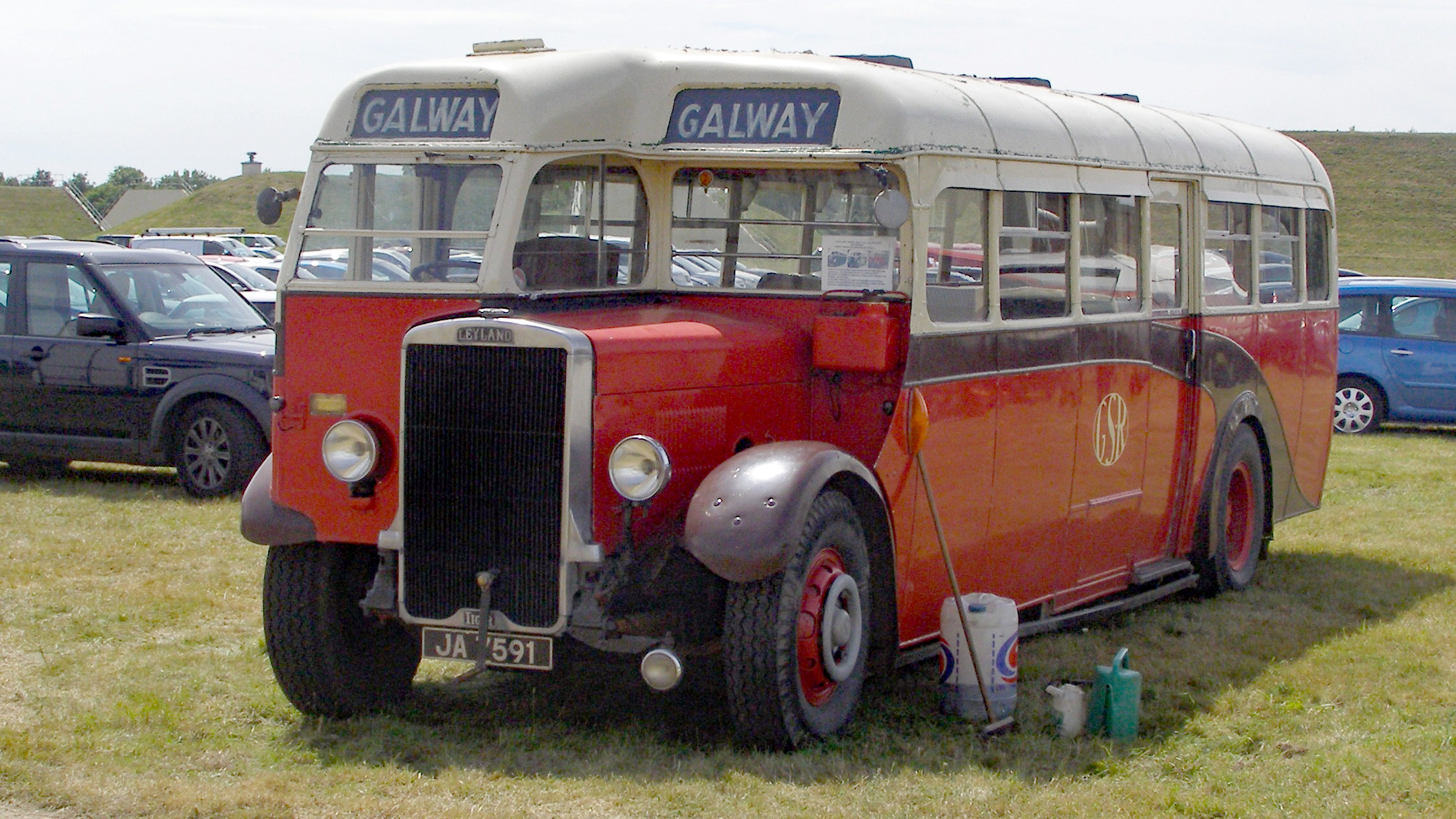
1936 Leyland Tiger

- Leviathan - 1925-1927
- Lion LSC1, LSC3 - 1925-1931
- Leopard (PLSC2) - 1926
- Leveret - 1926-1928
- Lioness - 1926-1934
- Lion (LT series) - 1929-1940
- Titan (front-engined, TD series) - 1927-1942, unfrozen only after 1940
- Titanic - 1927-1931
- Tiger (front-engined, TS series) - 1927-1942, unfrozen only after 1940
- Tigress - 1934-1939
- Badger - 1930-1936
- Cub - 1931-1938
- Cheetah - 1935-1940
- Gnu - 1937-1939
- Tiger FEC (underfloor engine) - London Transport TF Class - 1939
- REC Cub (rear engine) - London Transport CR Class - 1939
- Panda - 1940

Most chassis with names beginning with the letter L had four-cylinder engines; those beginning with the letter T had six-cylinder engines. There was a Tiger model (built in small numbers) with a four-cylinder engine

== 1945 - closure ==
=== Articulated ===
- Leyland-DAB articulated bus 1980-?

=== Double deck ===
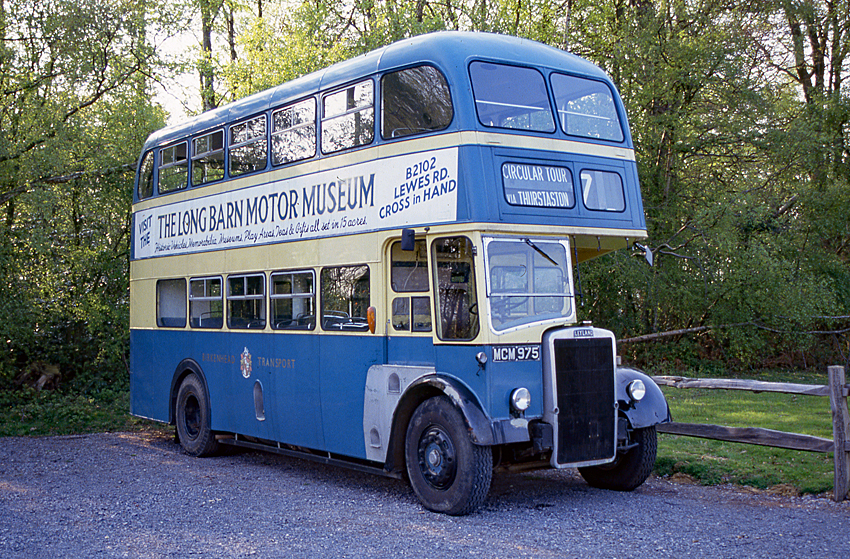
Leyland Titan PD2/40 with Massey bodywork of Birkenhead Corporation

- Titan (front-engined, PD series) - 1945-1970
- Lowlander - 1961-1966
- Atlantean - 1956-1986
- Fleetline - 1973-1980, from Daimler
- Titan (B15) - 1974-1984
- Victory Mark 2 - 1978-1981, built at Guy factory at Wolverhampton
- Olympian - 1979-1993
- Lion - 1986-1988

=== Single deck ===
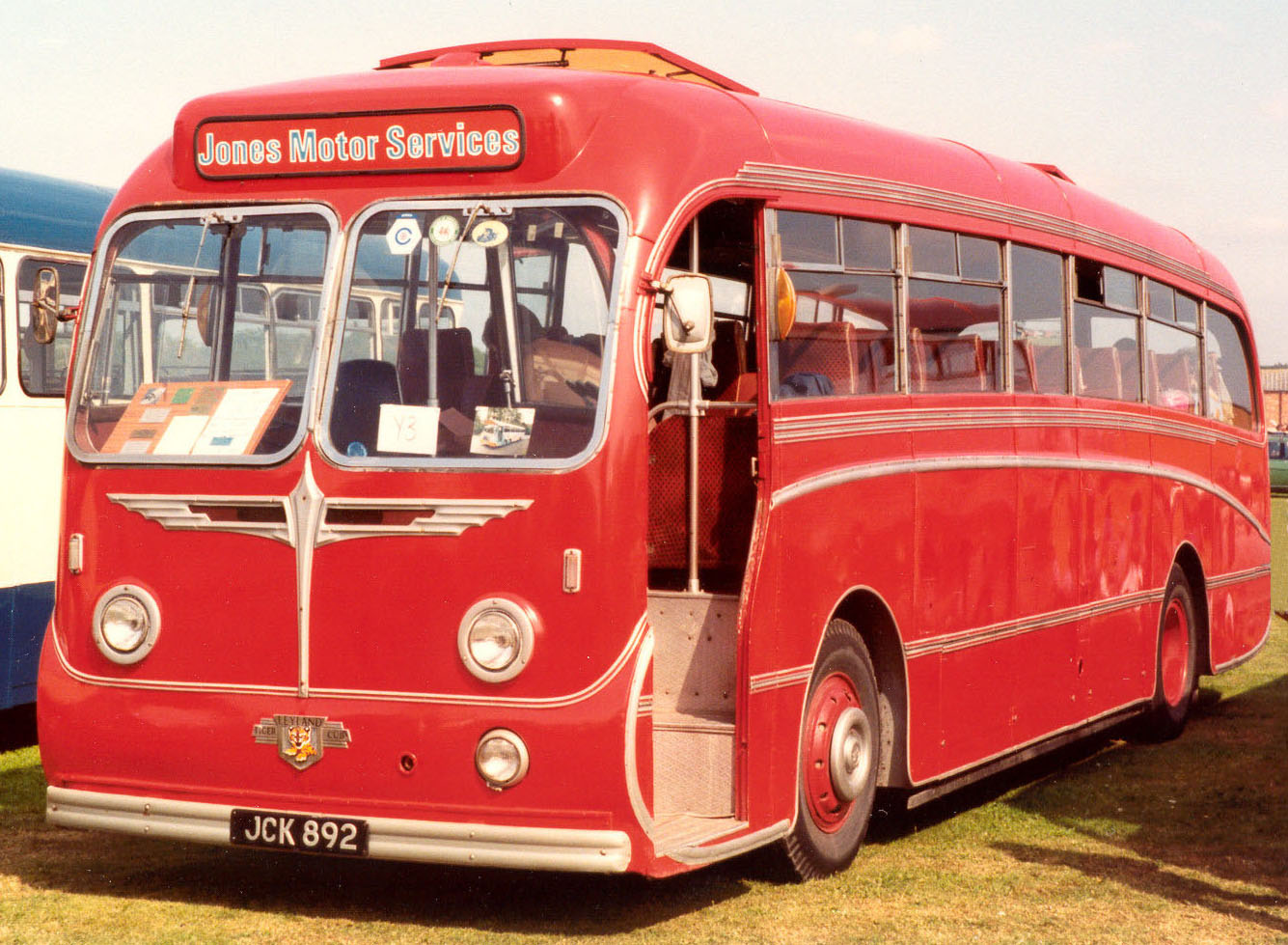
1956 Leyland Tiger Cub with HV Burlingham coachwork

- Tiger (front-engined, PS series) - 1948-1968
- Comet - 1948-1971
- Olympic - 1949-1971
- Royal Tiger - 1950-1955
- Worldmaster - 1955-1979
- Tiger Cub - 1952-1969
- Olympian - 1953-1958
- Leopard - 1959-1982
- Lion - 1960-1965
- Royal Tiger Cub - 1960-1968
- Panther - 1964-1972
- Panther Cub - 1964-1968
- National/National 2 - 1969-1985
- Cub - 1979-1987
- Tiger (mid-engined) - 1979-1992
- B21 - 1975-1983
- Super Viking - 1980-1984
- Royal Tiger (B50/B54) - 1982-1987
- Lynx - 1984-1992
- Swift - 1987-1991

== See also ==
- List of buses
- Leyland Motors
- Leyland Bus
