= Leyland Lion =

Leyland Lion can refer to either of two types of bus chassis

- Leyland Lion PSR1, a rear-engined single-deck chassis built between 1960 and 1967
- Leyland-DAB Lion, mid-engined double deck bus chassis manufactured between 1986 and 1988.

== See also ==
- List of Leyland buses
