= Danish Automobile Building =

Danish bus manufacturer

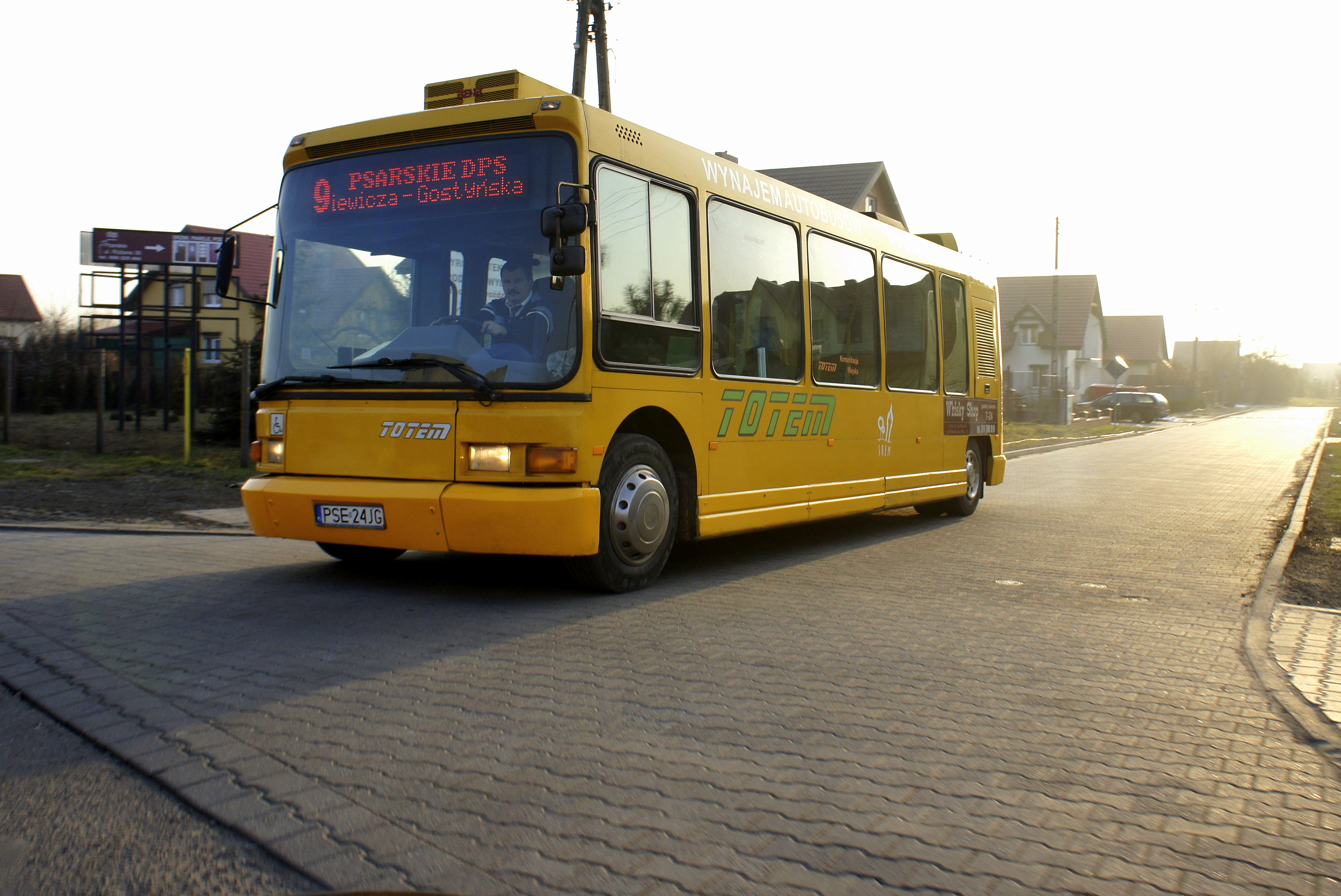
DAB 11-0860S in Śrem

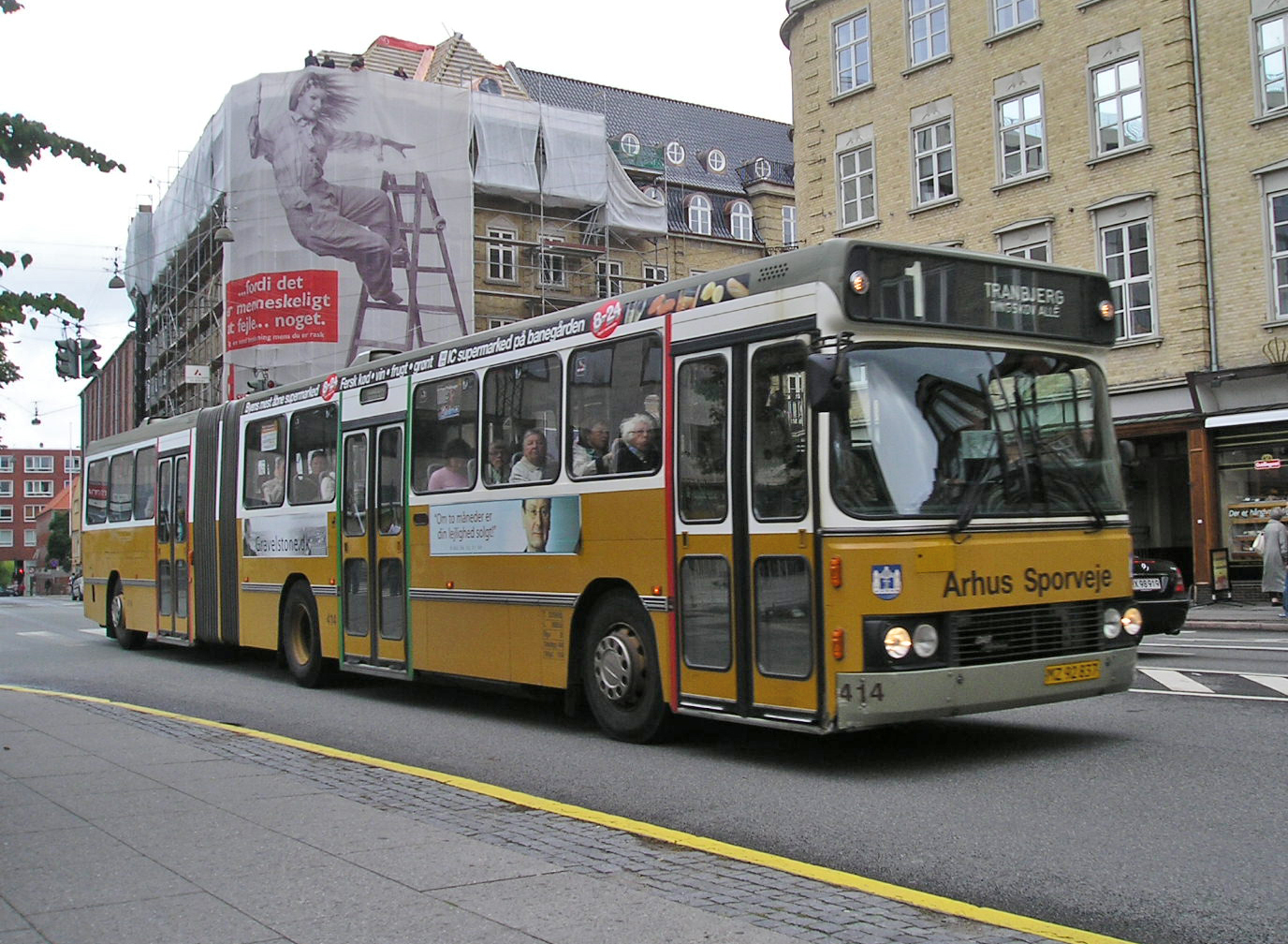
DAB 12-1800B

Danish Automobile Building (DAB) (Danish: Dansk Automobil Byggeri A/S) was a Danish bus manufacturer based in Silkeborg. It was in existence from 1912 until 2002.

DAB was founded in 1912 in Silkeborg by a Mr. J.W.Darr, a German. Starting as a truck maker, the company moved into mounting bus bodies on truck chassis, such as Audi, Krupp, and Büssing-NAG. DAB became a mainstream bus builder through the World Wars.

In 1953 DAB started collaborating with Leyland Motors of Great Britain and as a result DAB used Leyland components for many of its buses, commonly building bodies on Leyland chassis, although they still bodied buses on different chassis as needs arose. In the 1970s Leyland bought a majority stake in DAB and renamed the factory Leyland-DAB, DAB also built buses on Leyland underframes, some for import into the UK, such as the Leyland-DAB Lion and Guy Arab.

From 1964, DAB built a standardized bus, mainly for Copenhagen. These buses fell into 7 distinct models and went on to be sold to other private companies in Denmark until the model VII well into the 1990s. DAB's buses were alloy-bodied and of modular construction. In the 1980s DAB also started making articulated buses, producing the Leyland-DAB articulated bus. This saw domestic usage, and was the first articulated bus in the United Kingdom, albeit with limited repeat orders.

With the decline of Leyland, the Leyland DAB division was included in the 1987 sale of Leyland Bus to Volvo. In 1990 DAB went on to be a participant in the United Bus venture, with DAF Bus, Bova, Den Oudsten and Optare, with United Bus holding 70% of the shares of DAB. With the failure of the United venture, DAB became a wholly Danish owned factory again.

In the 1990s with the move to low-floor buses, DAB developed a new concept, the Travelator, later sold as the Servicebus. This was a full low floor short bus with the doors being placed behind the front wheels, in a similar concept to the later Optare Solo. Unusually the rear wheels could be specified as steering single wheels. The model was popular, gaining several export orders.

Scania took over the factory in 1995, the DAB models were initially continued. In 1997 DAB Silkeborg was renamed Scania A/B, Silkeborg. In 1999 production of in house DAB's by now more conventional low floor full length buses was discontinued, in favour of becoming one of two sites building Scania's own models, the OmniLink and OmniCity, the other site being Katrineholm in Sweden. Due to low order levels, Scania sold the factory to Vest Busscar of Norway in 2002, ending the DAB name.
