= United Bus =

European bus and coach manufacturing group

- Industry: Bus and coach manufacturing
- Founded: November 1989; 36 years ago
- Founders: DAF Bus; Bova
- Defunct: October 27, 1993; 33 years ago
- Fate: Bankruptcy
- Successors: VDL Bus & Coach; Optare; Den Oudsten; Danish Automobile Building
- Headquarters: Eindhoven, Netherlands
- Areas served: Continental Europe

United Bus was a European bus and coach manufacturing group created by the merger of Dutch manufacturers DAF Bus and Bova in November 1989. The merger was made in response to a joint review of the future European bus and coach industry. DAF took a majority stake in this merger, while Bova remained as an operating subsidiary, with plans for further expansion across Europe at the offset. All United Bus companies retained their identities while part of the group.

United Bus' first acquisition came in May 1990, with British bus body builder Optare being acquired for around £5 million (equivalent to £12,364,000 in 2025). Optare had previously collaborated with DAF by being licensed to build its Delta body on the DAF SB220 chassis. The collaboration between DAF and Optare led to the introduction of the Optare Spectra double-decker bus on the DAF DB250 chassis in 1992, designed as a successor to the MCW Metrobus. The Spectra eventually became the first low-floor double-decker bus in the United Kingdom.

United Bus expanded further in June 1990 with the acquisition and merger of Dutch coach body manufacturer Den Oudsten into the group, resulting in United Bus' western European market share increasing to 6%; Den Oudsten's North American New Flyer company was not involved in this merger. This was later followed by 40% of controlled shares in Danish Automobile Building (DAB) being acquired by United Bus, later increased to 70% by September 1992.

== Demise ==
Due to the early 1990s recession, an inability to secure more than a 6–7% market share in Europe and financial difficulties exacerbated by the bankruptcy of DAF Bus in January, United Bus filed for insolvency in October 1993. Some members of the group managed to survive independently; Optare was bought back by its management soon after the bankruptcy, expanding to body a range of different chassis before eventually developing the popular integral Optare Solo midibus in 1998, while DAF Bus was purchased by the VDL Groep following the bankruptcy and renamed to VDL Bus in 2003. The VDL Groep acquired a 30% shareholding in Bova before completely taking over the coach manufacturer in 2003, and both Bova and VDL Bus were later merged in 2010 to form VDL Bus & Coach.

DAB's Silkeborg factory was purchased by Swedish manufacturer Scania AB in 1995, with DAB later renamed to Scania AB Silkeborg in 1997. DAB's bus range ceased production at Silkeborg in 1999 in favour of Scania's OmniLink and OmniCity, and in January 2002, the factory was sold by Scania to Norwegian manufacturer Vest Busscar. Den Oudsten, after having been bought back by its namesake family 1993, was declared bankrupt in 2001 after a failed takeover by the Mayflower Group, resulting in the loss of 257 jobs at its Woerden headquarters.
