= Leyland-DAB articulated bus =

Danish articulated bus

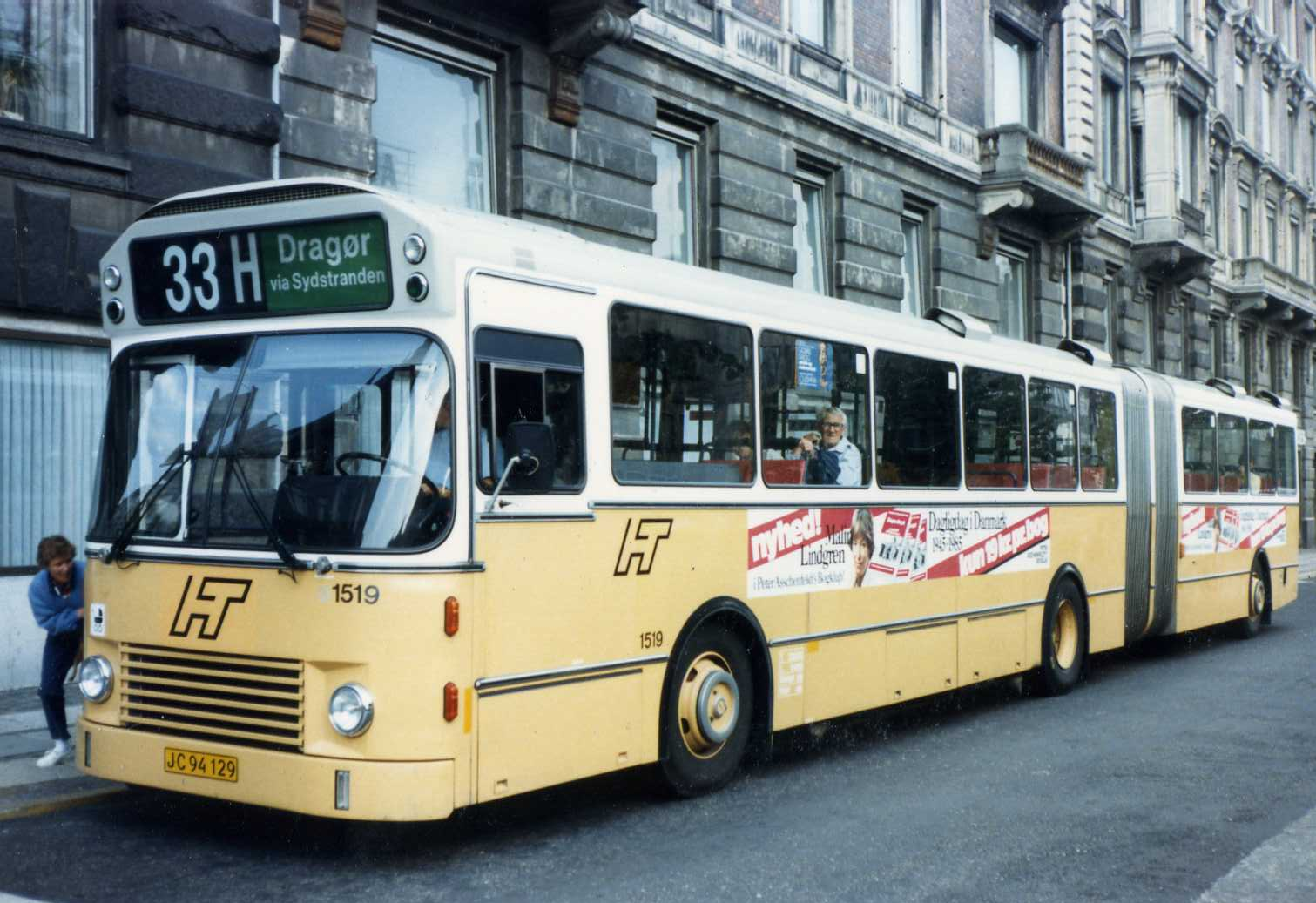
- Leyland-DAB in Copenhagen in 1986

Overview
- Manufacturer: Leyland/Danish Automobile Building

Body and chassis
- Doors: 1–3
- Floor type: Step entrance

The Leyland-DAB articulated bus is an articulated bus that was manufactured by Leyland-DAB in Denmark. The Leyland-DAB artic found customers in Denmark, and was the first modern style articulated bus in the United Kingdom, albeit with limited repeat orders.

Leyland, being a mainly British manufacturer, had also had an overseas manufacturing interest in the Danish manufacturer Danish Automobile Building (DAB) since 1953, which used a number of Leyland parts in its own bus models. As a continental manufacturer, it had developed its own articulated bus model as an alternative to Volvo's articulated chassis. These were built with two body designs.

== National body type ==
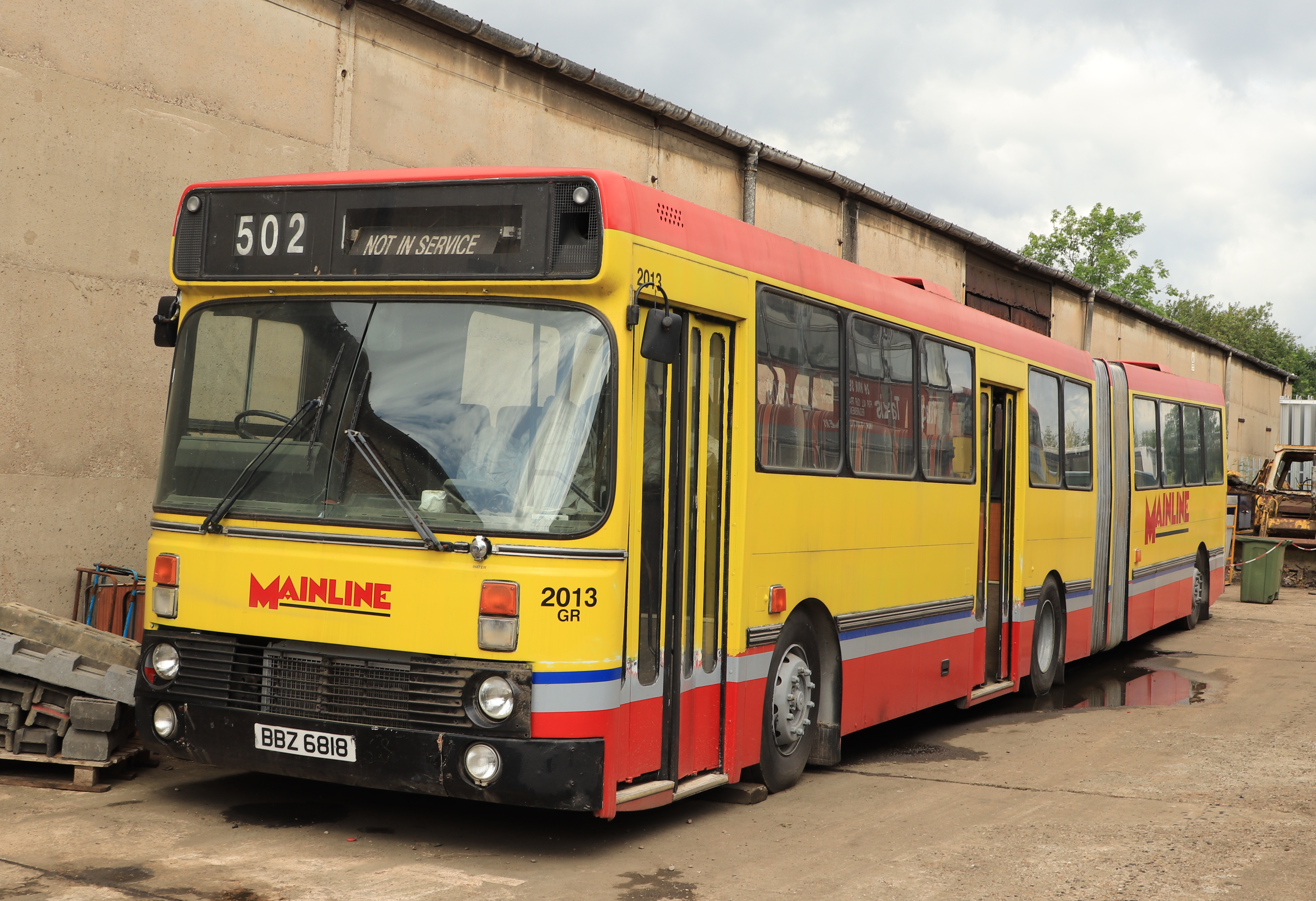
A South Yorkshire example, now preserved

The first models of 1979 were based on the Leyland National, but were powered by a Saurer 240 bhp underfloor engine and Allison fully-automatic transmission instead of the Leyland components. Other parts like the axles and the steering mechanism were also from Leyland.

Four of these buses saw extended trials in the United Kingdom with the South Yorkshire Passenger Transport Executive, (SYPTE) and were demonstrated with other UK operators, with seven purchased by British Airways.

== DAB body type ==
Later deliveries from 1985 employed all Leyland components again, but with DAB designed bodies. This bus saw use in Denmark. In the UK, SYPTE bought 13 in 1985.

== Australia ==
In 1980, Australian operator Darwin Bus Service had a Leyland-DAB bodied by Pressed Metal Corporation South Australia.
