= Leyland Bus =

British bus & train manufacturer

- Industry: Bus manufacturing
- Predecessor: British Leyland/Rover Group; Eastern Coach Works
- Founded: January 1987; 39 years ago
- Founders: John Kinnear; Ian McKinnon; Jim McKnight; George Newburn; Eric Turner
- Defunct: 1993; 33 years ago
- Fate: Acquired by Volvo Buses
- Successor: Volvo Buses
- Headquarters: Farington, Leyland, United Kingdom
- Number of locations: 2 factories (Farington and Workington); 4 service centres; (1987)
- Products: Lion; Lynx; Olympian; Swift; Tiger (Royal Tiger)

Leyland Bus was a British bus and train manufacturer based in Farington, Lancashire. It emerged from the Rover Group, formerly known as British Leyland, as a management buyout of the group's bus business. Leyland Bus was subsequently acquired by Volvo Buses in 1988, with the Leyland name eventually dropped by Volvo in 1993.

== History ==
=== Formation ===
Leyland Bus could trace its history as far back as 1896 with the formation of the Lancashire Steam Motor Company, which changed its name to Leyland Motors following the turn of the century. Bus manufacturing by Leyland commenced at a factory in Leyland, Lancashire in 1919. The British Leyland Motor Corporation (BLMC) was formed in 1968 with the merger of Leyland Motors with British Motor Holdings, and in 1975, the BLMC was nationalised by the government of the United Kingdom to become British Leyland (BL).

British Leyland eventually organised its bus manufacturing under the Passenger Carrying Division, developing successful products such as the Leyland National, the Leyland Olympian, and the Leyland Tiger. As part of a 1981 reorganisation of British Leyland's Commercial Vehicle Division into the Leyland Group, this division was later renamed to Leyland Bus. The new business unit expanded into integral bus body building in late 1982 with the sale of the National Bus Company's 50% shareholding in Bus Manufacturers (Holdings), which included Bristol Commercial Vehicles, Eastern Coach Works and Charles H. Roe, to Leyland Bus.

=== Management buyout ===
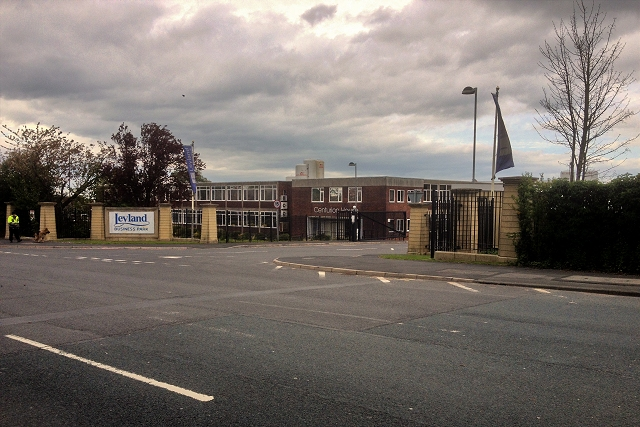
Entrance to the former Leyland Bus headquarters and factory in Farington in May 2015, now in use as the Leyland Business Park

By 1986, British Leyland had changed its name to the Rover Group and was being prepared for sale to interested parties such as General Motors, with various subsidiaries being sold independently from the group. Leyland Bus was incurring the heaviest losses within the commercial vehicle division of the Rover Group at the time, making a £30 million (equivalent to £92,917,000 in 2025) loss in 1985, partially as a result of the incoming deregulation of the bus industry causing a collapse of orders in favour of minibuses built on van-derived chassis.

Despite competing bids by Metro Cammell Weymann and the Volvo Bus Corporation, a management buyout led by Leyland Bus managing director Ian McKinnon and supported by divisional directors John Kinnear, Jim McKnight, George Newburn and Eric Turner was ultimately approved in August 1986 by the Rover Group and the government. The sale of Leyland Bus was completed in January 1987 at a final price of £4 million (equivalent to £11,571,000 in 2025), by which point the management team had gained an improved deal that included a warehousing and distribution agreement with Leyland Parts, which enabled Leyland Bus to supply its own parts. Also included in the final deal were the Farrington and Workington factories, four service centres in Bristol, Chorley, Glasgow and Nottingham, as well as a business exporting used buses to Hong Kong.

In an attempt to become profitable, the newly privatised Leyland Bus undertook a cost-cutting rationalisation programme that resulted in a total of 757 workers being made redundant, with redundancy costs being covered by the Rover Group. The Thurston Road headquarters was closed, resulting in 158 job losses while administrative operations moved to the Farington factory, while the Workington factory saw production of the Leyland Olympian chassis transferred to Farington. 468 and 134 workers were ultimately made redundant at both the Farington and Workington factories respectively. The Eastern Coach Works factory at Lowestoft, not included in the management buyout sale, also closed following the completion of a bodywork order for London Regional Transport.

=== Acquisition by Volvo ===
Leyland Bus was acquired by Volvo in April 1988. The company was initially retained as an independent subsidiary of the Volvo Bus Corporation, with all Leyland Bus board members except George Newburn and Eric Turner remaining with the company following the sale. Volvo Buses President Lars Erik Nilsson was appointed as chairman of Leyland Bus, while marketing director Jurgen Bahr was temporarily appointed as managing director. Volvo had attempted to purchase British Leyland's bus operations three times prior in 1982, 1984 and 1986, with the latter bid beaten by the management buyout that led to the creation of Leyland Bus. Both companies had a combined 75% market share in new buses in the United Kingdom at the end of 1987, with the companies also having a 57% share in new coaches that same year.

Leyland and Volvo soon consolidated their separate bus and coach-building operations into the Volvo Leyland Bus Executive Group in October 1988. A new company named VL Bus and Coach was launched on 1 January 1989 as the group's marketer for new Volvo and Leyland vehicles in the United Kingdom. Restructuring of Leyland Bus commenced in April 1989, with the Farrington and Workington factories and their products retained, while Leyland's four existing service centres were turned into VL Support Centres, enabling them to service both Leyland and Volvo buses and coaches; ten dealerships joined this scheme later in 1989. New Leyland vehicles could also be offered with Volvo drivelines and suspensions through VL Bus and Coach, with an example being Leyland Lynx Mark IIs being supplied with Volvo THD102KF engines as opposed to options including the Leyland TL11 engine, and a new parts warehouse stocking both Volvo and Leyland bus parts in Magna Park, Lutterworth, Leicestershire opened for business in January 1990.

=== Demise ===
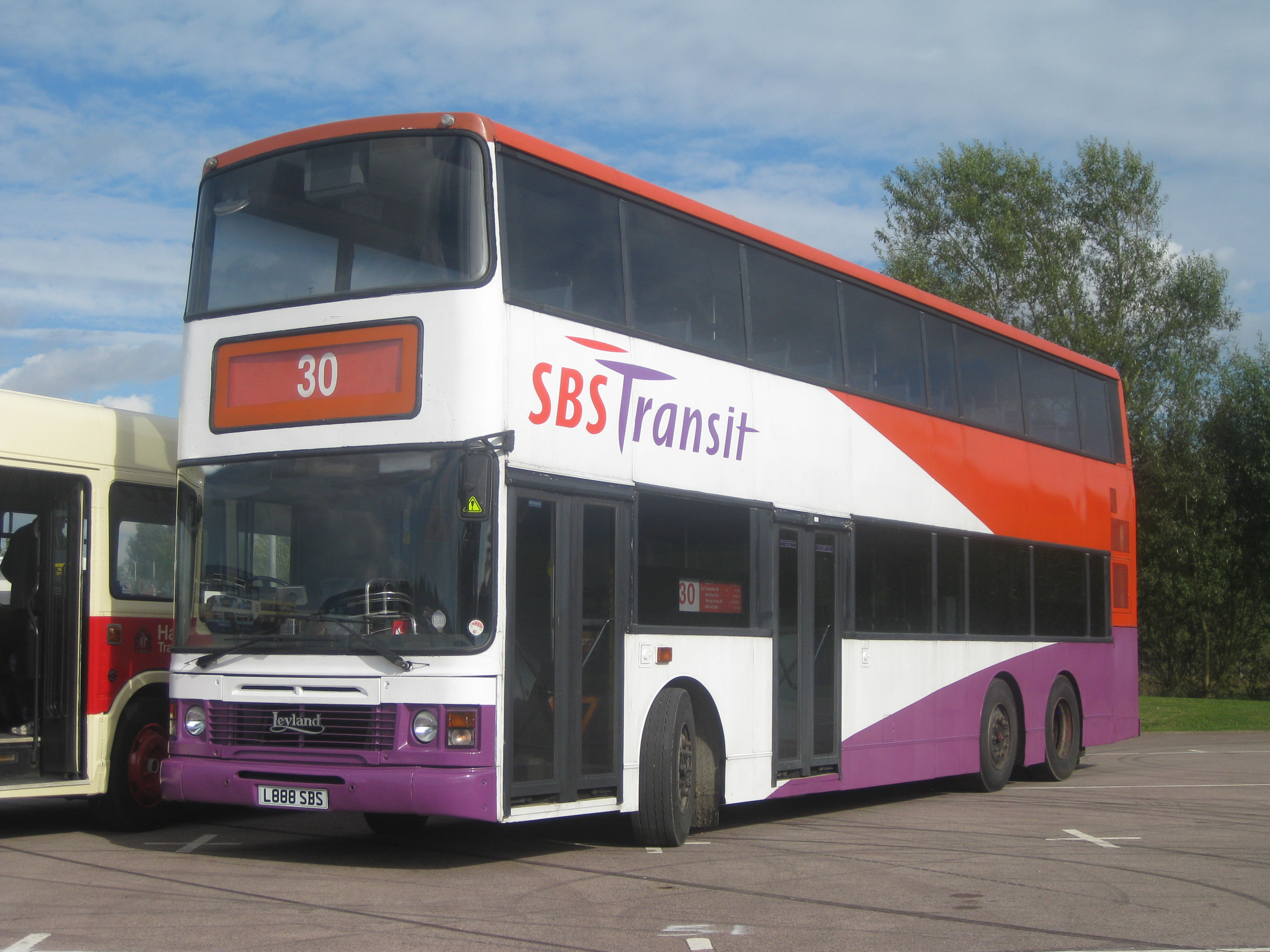
The last Leyland bus produced, a Singapore Bus Services tri-axle Leyland Olympian with Alexander bodywork

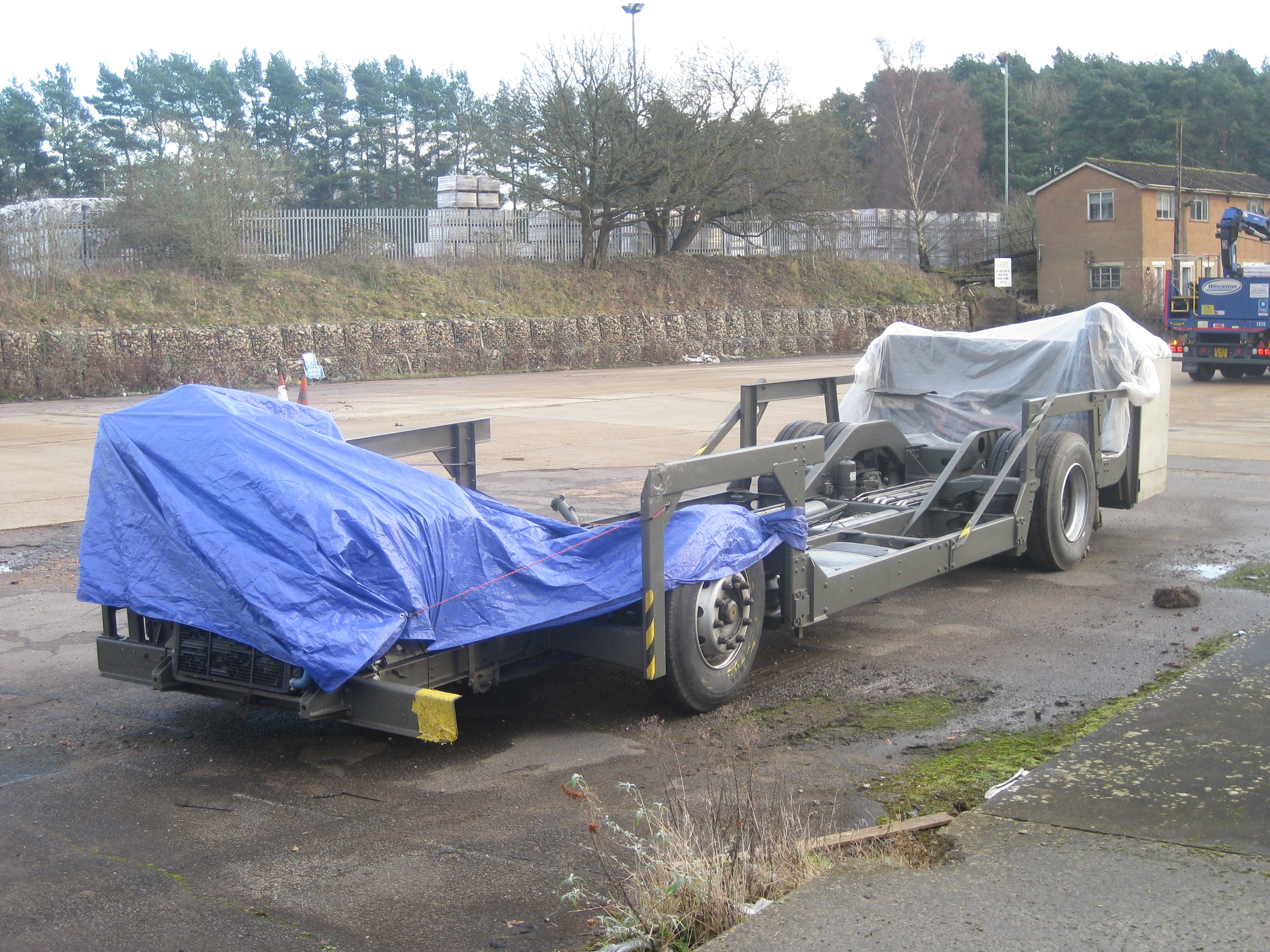
Development Volvo Olympian chassis, the third of the type built produced at Volvo's Irvine factory

As part of the rationalisation of the Leyland Bus business by Volvo, the Leyland Royal Tiger, the Leyland-DAB Lion and the Leyland TL11 engine were discontinued at the end of 1988; production of the TL11 engine had been discontinued due to Leyland's engine manufacturing plant being included in a merger between Leyland Trucks and DAF Trucks a year prior, forming DAF NV, which traded as Leyland DAF in the United Kingdom. The Volvo B10M chassis also entered production alongside the Leyland Lynx and Olympian at the Workington factory at the end of 1989.

In January 1990, Leyland Bus announced it would transfer all chassis manufacturing from Farington to Workington, leaving only the Leyland Bus headquarters and component manufacturing at the site, resulting in the loss of 380 jobs. VL Bus and Coach also announced the merger of Leyland and Volvo's sales and marketing operations, with most positions being moved to Volvo's Gothenburg headquarters, though its UK and Asian market specialists remained at Farington. 180 jobs at the Workington factory, making up 25% of the workforce, were cut in May 1990 as a result of a fall in bus sales in the United Kingdom.

After the sale of the Farington site in June 1991, which coincided with both a depressed bus and coach market amid the early 1990s recession and the formation of a new UK company named Volvo Bus Limited bringing together Volvo's UK bus building, sales and parts supply under one company, Volvo announced the closure of the Workington factory and the discontinuation of the Leyland Bus brand in December 1991. However, as a result of a large volume of sympathetic orders from multiple bus operators, the factory did not close until early 1993, two years later than originally planned. Leyland Bus's last ever integrally-produced bodies were delivered to Preston Bus in 1992, while the final Leyland buses produced at Workington were among an export batch of 200 tri-axle Olympian chassis delivered with Alexander bodywork to Singapore Bus Services in early 1993.

The Olympian was the sole Leyland Bus product retained by Volvo following the discontinuation of the brand, with a heavily redesigned chassis being launched as the Volvo Olympian that same year. Production of the Volvo Olympian commenced at Volvo's new Irvine factory in Scotland, built to replace the Workington facility, however this factory also closed in 1999, with bus chassis production moving to Sweden and Poland.

== Products ==
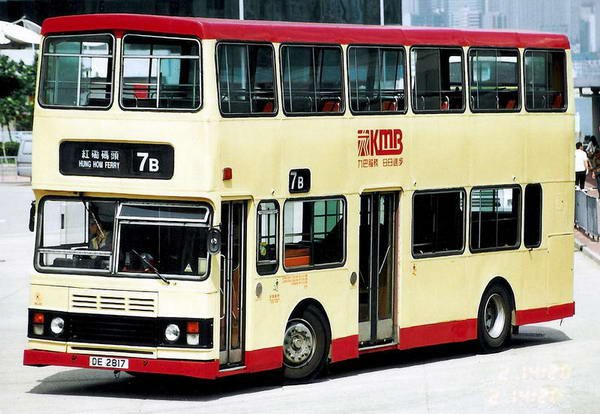
A Kowloon Motor Bus 2-axle Leyland Olympian in Hong Kong

- Leyland-DAB Lion – 2-axle double-decker bus chassis produced in collaboration with Danish Automobile Building
- Leyland Lynx – Single-deck full-size integral bus, built to replace Leyland National
- Leyland Olympian – 2 and 3-axle double-decker bus chassis, continuation of British Leyland product launched in 1979
- Leyland Swift - Midibus chassis, developed in competition with the Dennis Dart
- Leyland Tiger - 2 and 3-axle Coach chassis, continuation of British Leyland product launched in 1981
  - Leyland Royal Tiger - Executive equivalent of the standard Tiger chassis, a majority of which were produced as the integrally-designed Leyland Royal Tiger Doyen

== See also ==
- List of Leyland buses
- Ashok Leyland
  - Switch Mobility
- Leyland Trucks
