= Leyland Royal Tiger =

Leyland Royal Tiger Leyland Royal Tiger Doyen
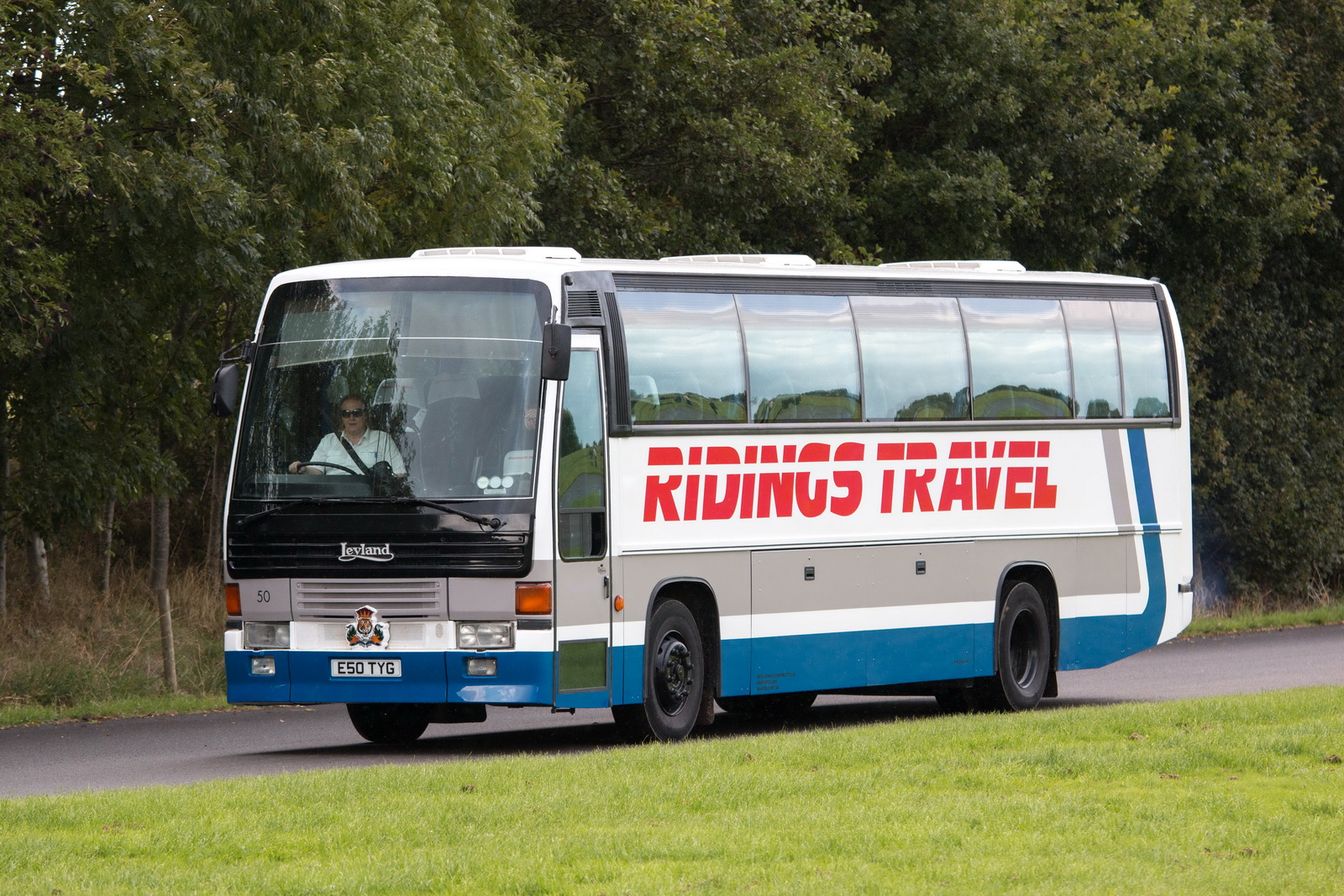
- Preserved Ridings Travel Leyland Royal Tiger Doyen in September 2017

Overview
- Manufacturer: Leyland Bus
- Production: 1982-1987
- Assembly: Cross Gates, Leeds, West Yorkshire; Workington, Cumbria, England
- Designer: John Heffernan

Body and chassis
- Doors: 1
- Floor type: Step entrance
- Related: Leyland Tiger

Powertrain
- Engine: Leyland TL11; Cummins L10
- Capacity: 49-53 seated
- Power output: 245–260 brake horsepower (183–194 kW)
- Transmission: Leyland Hydracyclic five-speed automatic or semi-automatic ZF S6-80 six speed manual

Dimensions
- Length: 12 m (39 ft)
- Width: 2.5 m (8 ft 2 in)
- Height: 3.42 m (11.2 ft)

The Leyland Royal Tiger was a rear-engined semi-integral luxury coach chassis manufactured by Leyland Bus between 1982 and 1987. Launched in October 1982 at Brighton's Metropole hotel, the Royal Tiger was an evolution of Leyland's conventional Tiger chassis intended to compete with foreign manufacturers' luxury touring coaches, such as those produced by Mercedes-Benz or bodied by Jonckheere and Van Hool on DAF, Scania and Volvo chassis. The Royal Tiger did not prove particularly successful, however, with only between 160 and 170 built before production was discontinued in 1988.

== Design ==
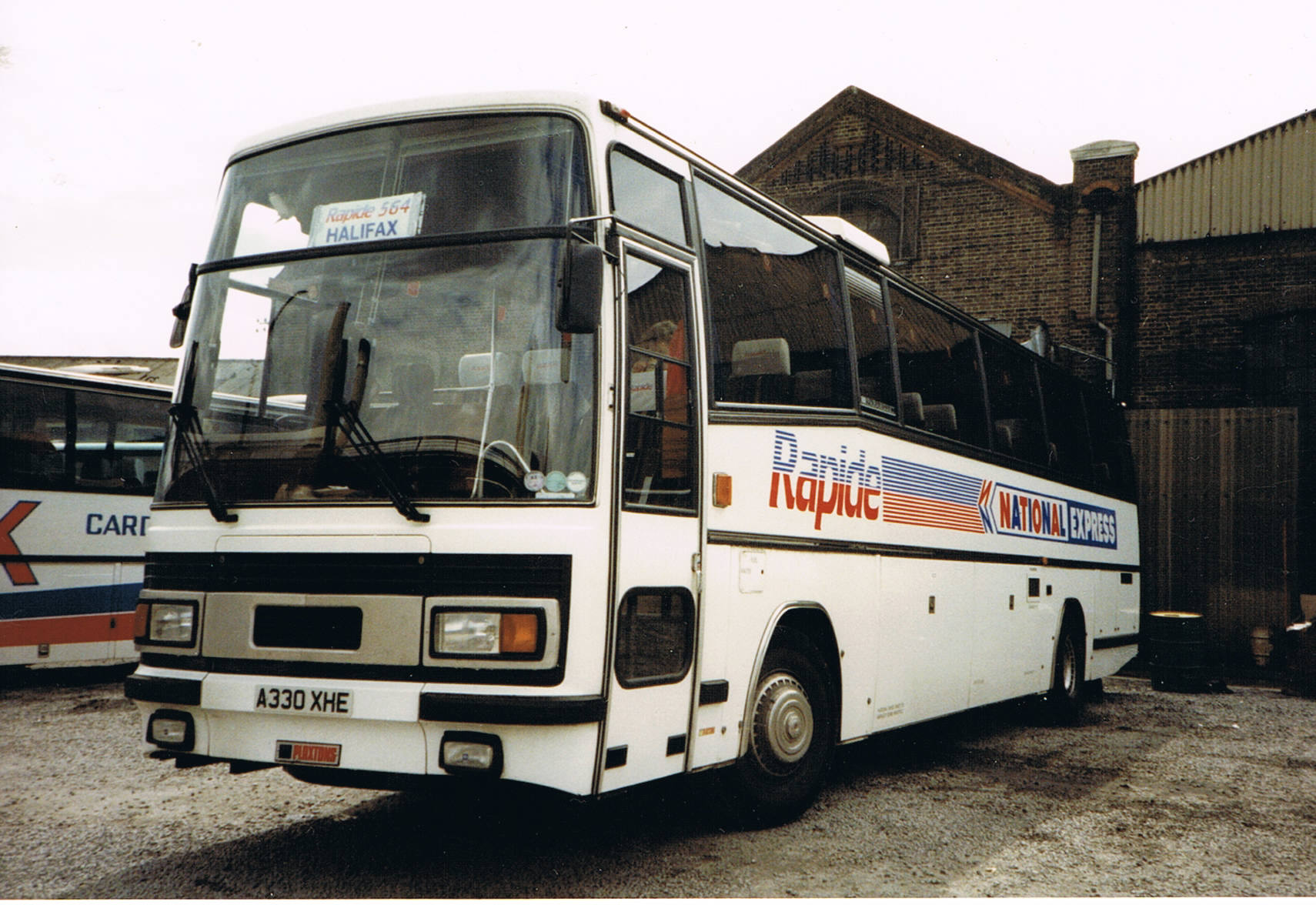
National Express Leyland Royal Tiger with Plaxton Paramount 3500 body

Leyland predominantly marketed the Royal Tiger with an integrally-built 'Doyen' body designed by John Heffernan, gaining the integral product the name Leyland Royal Tiger Doyen. Royal Tiger Doyens featured an aerodynamic front end design with a doubled-curvature windscreen, bonded double-glazed side windows, fibreglass front and rear panels and aluminium side panels. The Royal Tiger underframe could also be assembled as a separate product for bodying by Leyland's "approved bodybuilders", with some Royal Tigers built with Plaxton Paramount or Van Hool Alizée bodywork.

Internally, the Royal Tiger Doyen featured 53 reclining seats available in a range of colours matched to floor and roof carpets, heating and demisters for both the driver and passenger area, provision for the installation of a toilet or servery and fabric covered overhead luggage racks as standard with an option to also specify overhead lockers. Two higher-specification variants of the Royal Tiger Doyen, the 'Silver Crown' and the 'Golden Crown', mainly featuring differing interior trim, were later launched by Leyland Bus in 1986.

The Royal Tiger's 12 m (39 ft) underframe was assembled with the use of a large space frame built from rectangular section steel tubes, as opposed to conventional chassis members used on previous Leyland products. The front axle and steering layout of Leyland's Olympian double-decker bus was reused in the Royal Tiger, and as standard, Royal Tigers were fitted with Leyland's TL11 engine, capable of a power output of 245–260 brake horsepower (183–194 kW), and a Leyland Hydracyclic five-speed automatic or semi-automatic gearbox with a retarder, with options for the latter to be replaced with a ZF S6-80 six speed manual with a Telma retarder. Customer demand and the eventual discontinuation of Leyland's TL11 engine later saw the Cummins L10 engine added as an option.

Early Royal Tigers were built at Leyland subsidiary Charles H Roe's Cross Gates factory in Leeds, however as a result of manufacturing difficulties at Cross Gates and the eventual closure of the factory the following year, production of the Royal Tiger additionally commenced at Leyland's bus factory in Workington in autumn 1983. After initially being considered for discontinuation by Leyland Bus in 1986,, and following the takeover of Leyland by Volvo Buses, the Royal Tiger ceased production in 1988; only 150 Royal Tiger Doyens had been built, 42 produced at Cross Gates and the remaining 108 at Workington, as well as 65 Royal Tiger underframes.

== Operators ==
The first production Royal Tiger Doyen was delivered to Brafferton, North Yorkshire independent Eddie Brown Tours in May 1983, ordered shortly after the Royal Tiger's Brighton launch; proprietor Eddie Brown did not order another Royal Tiger as he felt it did not live up to Leyland's publicity. Early customers included London independent Grey-Green, the six Scottish Bus Group subsidiaries, and National Bus Company subsidiaries both for National Express 'Rapide' duties and for coach holidays through National Holidays. A further ten Royal Tiger Doyens were ordered by National Express in February 1983, however two were later cancelled and replaced by imported Bova Futuras as a result of late deliveries, with four from this order additionally being held back to be delivered in 1984.

National Travel East operated the largest number of Royal Tiger underframes, taking delivery of eleven with Plaxton Paramount bodies, while their successor Ridings Travel operated the largest number of Royal Tiger Doyen integrals, taking delivery of eight during 1988. Only a few Royal Tigers have survived, including a West Riding example in preservation at the Dewsbury Bus Museum.
