= Leyland-MCW Olympic =

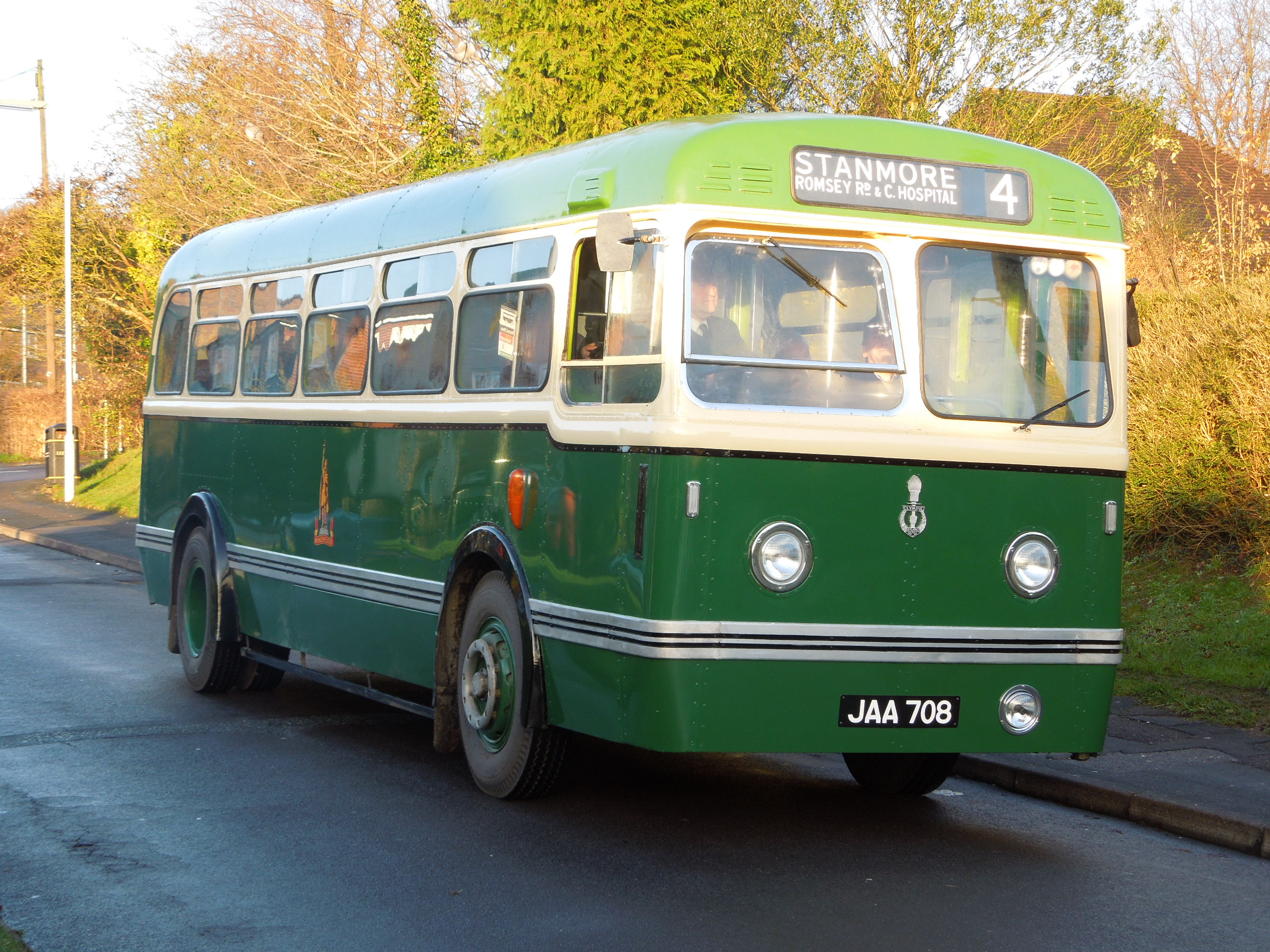
- Preserved Leyland Olympic HR40 in January 2013

Overview
- Manufacturer: Leyland; Metro Cammell Weymann
- Production: 1949-1971

Body and chassis
- Doors: 1-3

Powertrain
- Engine: Leyland O.600; Leyland O.680
- Capacity: 600 cubic inches (9.8 litres); 680 cubic inches (11.1 litres)
- Power output: 125-200 bhp
- Transmission: Leyland synchromesh, 4 speeds; Self-Changing Gears Penumocyclic direct-acting semi-automatic, electric or air control, 4 or 5 speeds

Dimensions
- Length: 27ft 6in to 40ft (8.5m-12m)

The Leyland-MCW Olympic was an underfloor-engined single-deck bus manufactured for at least eighteen countries from 1949 to 1971. 3,564 Olympics were built at four factories (three in the UK, one in South Africa) from 1949 to 1971, with 1,299 Olympics (36%) built as right hand drive and 2,265 (64%) as left hand drive. It was a very durable heavy-duty bus which ran in arduous conditions for longer periods than ever envisaged by its designers.

== History ==
In 1948, the first post-war Olympic Games were held in London. At the same time, Leyland Motors were working on a horizontally orientated version of their recently announced O.600 9.8-litre diesel engine. Leyland were not new to this design concept, the pre-war 8.6-litre engine was used in horizontal orientation for the London Transport TF-class Tiger FEC single-deckers and the sole Leyland Panda but, like the contemporary work of Tilling-Stevens and a slightly later prototype from AEC, such designs were put into abeyance to further the war effort. Initially, the O.600H engine was sold to Scandanvian bus makers, Scania-Vabis of Sweden and Strømmen of Norway but, in exhibiting it at the 1948 Commercial Motor show at the Earls Court Exhibition Centre, Leyland made clear it would soon be available on the home market.

In 1948, Leyland and the MCW sales organisation concluded a twenty-year agreement that they would exclusively collaborate on integral designs and favour one another with body-on-chassis business. Their idea was that an under-frame comprising durable Leyland engines and other mechanical units would be permanently attached to a similarly heavy-duty body structure. This idea became the Leyland-MCW Olympic and was built over three series from 1949.

== Description ==
A body frame comprising welded steel tube longitudinals, uprights and diagonals to the waistrail: with heavy duty stress-panels and aluminium upper frame sections riveted thereupon was constructed to a joint design by either Weymann or Metro-Cammell in England or by the MCW group's South African subsidiary Bus Bodies (South Africa) in Port Elizabeth; this was permanently attached to a Leyland under-frame, not drivable unless bodied. To this under-frame, Leyland attached all running units comprising radiator, engine, axles, suspension, steering, gearbox, brakes, controls etc. Once under-frame and body were permanently married up, the frame would be clad in aircraft-grade aluminium and finished. The original idea was to offer a bus to one of three specifications: home market, right-hand drive export or left-hand drive export. It would be a stronger bus than any built before. It would be a standard bus for all world markets.

=== Series One ===
The components in the Olympic under-frame, to be built at Leyland Motors' Farington works, were mainly as in the Tiger PS2 and Titan PD2, except that the radiator was a fabricated unit designed to fit behind the front axle and below the passenger floor, the rear axle was a new spiral-bevel unit.

The variants of the Olympic were as follows:

Type	Market	Driving control	Wheelbase	Overall length	Width	Factory*
HR40	Home	Right	15 ft 7in	27 ft 6in	7 ft 6in	W, B
ER36	Export	Right	15 ft 7in	29 ft 3in	8 ft	M
EL36	Export	Left	15 ft 7in	29 ft 3in	8 ft	M
EL40	Export	Left	17 ft 6in	31 ft 8in	8 ft	M
ER40	Export	Right	17 ft 6in	31 ft 8in	8 ft	M, B
EL44	Export	Left	20 ft 4in	34 ft 6in	8 ft	M
ER44	Export	Right	20 ft 4in	34 ft 6in	8 ft	M, B

Factories producing the superstructure were planned as follows:

- W = Weymanns
- M = Metropolitan-Cammell
  - All Metro-Cammell bus production was at Elmdon until 1969, when market contraction both for buses and railway carriages led the board of then parent Laird Group to sell the factory and relocate bus building back at the Washwood Heath 'A shop' where the Midland Carriage Works had built its first bus body in 1924. Among the last vehicles built at Elmdon were the two prototype Metro Scania single deckers. The final 115 Olympic EL3A/41 coaches for Cuba were built at Washwood Heath.
- B = Bus Builders (South Africa)

Options for the HR, following a relaxation of UK dimensional rules in 1950 included greater, nominal 30 ft (9.2m), length, with the same wheelbase, with which models were coded HR44 (for 44 seats) and optional widths, the new UK maximum being 8 ft thus later HR series Olympics had designations such as HR44/90/S if to the previous width or EL44/96/S if 8 ft wide. The HR44 can be distinguished from the HR40 by a slightly longer rear overhang and a flatter panel above the side windows allowing for sign-painted advertisements. Although in the published production records the width suffixes are not used and the relationship between the type number and seats fitted soon becomes very tenuous indeed.

=== Series Two ===
Leyland announced the Royal Tiger Worldmaster (RT series) in 1954 as the replacement for the Royal Tiger and from about 18 months later the units from it became standard in EL and ER Olympics, around 1956 the series 2 Olympic was announced, this used Worldmaster units, in particular the O.680H diesel engine and the Pneumocylic gearbox and the body styling was revised. Designations were now EL2 or ER2 (home market sales were dropped in 1953).

Lengths and wheelbases were quoted as follows:

- Ex2/40 (18 ft wheelbase, 33 ft overall length)
- Ex2/44 (20 ft wheelbase, 35 ft overall length)

== Production and sales ==
=== Home market ===
A radio celebrity at the time of the Olympic's launch was Professor CEM Joad, whose catchphrase on the BBC programme The Brains Trust was:

"It all depends what you mean by…"

In the case of the HR series Olympic it really did all depend what you meant by home as of the 92 'home' models built in the British Isles 2 were exported (one each to Trinidad and New Zealand) and a further 31 'home' models were built by the South African subsidiary and they exported 11 of them to Rhodesia.

The use of British Isles here is deliberate as 8 'home' Olympics were purchased by the Isle of Man Road Services, and like the Channel Islands, the Isle of Man is not part of the UK.

Four Leyland-owned prototypes/demonstrators were constructed at Metro-Cammell's Elmdon Birmingham works in 1948-9 and registered in 1950–1 with Birmingham Marks KOC233-4, 241–2, these formed 4% of the total production for use in the British Isles. The other 96% were built by Weymann who was meant to supply all of the home market vehicles and none for export but nevertheless exported the two mentioned earlier and provided a fifth Leyland Demonstrator in RPA771. The four KOC registered buses all eventually ended up in service with the Welsh independent Llynfi Motor Services of Maesteg who furnished most of their fleet requirement by buying demonstrators cheaply from major bus manufacturers. RPA771 was purchased by Sheffield Transport for the wholly council-owned A fleet.

The lion's share of 'home' Olympic sales (58%) were to BET group companies. Including the New Zealand and Trinidad buses and the demonstrators the percentage shares were as follows (of 92 buses so rounding errors have occurred):

- Ribble Motor Services 30 (33%)
- Western Welsh 10 (11%)
- Yorkshire Woollen 10 (11%)
- North Western 2(2%)
- James 1 (1%)

Red & White Services had 2 and its subsidiary United Welsh Services had one, these were ordered before the Red & White Group sold its bus interests to the British Transport Commission but delivered afterwards so that the state-sector bought 3% of 'home' Olympics.

The eight sold to the Isle of Man account for 8%.

Municipal buyers were:

- Birmingham 5 (5%)
- Sheffield 4 (4%)
- Edinburgh 1 (1%)
- Stockton 1 (1%) - This was the last 'home market' Olympic registered and the only one registered in 1952 although the model was offered on home markets for a further year.

The remaining ten buses went to independents:

- John Fishwick & Sons, Leyland, 8 (8%)
- Jennings, Ashen, 1 (1%)
- King Alfred, Winchester 1 (1%)

Already the Leyland-MCW idea of a totally standard bus had been stymied by the width and length changes, and the corporation fleets (whose General Managers and Transport Committee Chairmen were always trying to establish individuality for the sake of civic pride) further muddied the waters, Birmingham's five HR40s sat 36, Edinburgh's sole HR44 had only thirty two seats and an open rear-platform entrance as on contemporary double deckers (and most of the rest of Edinburgh's small single deck fleet). The Stockton bus had front and rear doors and 42 seats. Some of the independent and BET fleets also went for non-standard seating plans, two of Fishwick's and the Jennings bus sat 40 in coach seats whilst Yorkshire Woollen District's second five had 42 bus seats. Still it was nothing to what began to happen elsewhere in the Olympic's complicated production schedule.

Weymann-bodied HR Olympic production ceased in 1951, the Royal Tiger was more to the home market's taste, as (even more so) would be the forthcoming Leyland Tiger Cub. Weymanns did however build all 60 Leyland-MCW Olympians and did finishing and inspection work on MCW-built Olympics until its closure in 1966.

=== Vehicles built in South Africa ===
Bus Builders (South Africa) of Port Elizabeth, a subsidiary of MCW, assembled 31 Olympics to HR44 pattern in 1951–5. 11 were sold to two operators in Rhodesia, Of the remaining 20 domestic sales 12 went to municipals and eight to independents. Eleven of the South African buses sat 44 and nine sat 45. An illustration in The Leyland Bus shows a South African HR44 differed from the Weymann built version in having full-depth sliding windows and having the emergency exit relocated from the rear face of the bus to the offside, thus having two, rather than three rear windows.

Of the Rhodesian examples the seven for Salisbury United were 45 seaters and the four for Thatcher Hobson of Broken Hill were 56 seaters, (presumably 3+2 and not intended for those with paler skins) these last four were delivered in 1955, but like the rest of the 20 later South African HR Olympics they had 52xxxx numbers, suggesting completion of running units at Farington during 1952, the first 11 of the South African HR44s had 50xxxx numbers. There was one apparent demonstrator, Leyland chassis 504432 whose destiny is unrecorded in the sales lists. 521964 is ascribed to Cape Town but unregistered and without fleet number, maybe it was a set of spare components (Australian municipals did the same). A perhaps pivotal early sale though was of 'chassis' 504812 which went to PUTCO, Johannesburg, part of United Transport, the Red & White Group's colonial arm: Salisbury United were another member of the United Transport group, United Transport later gradually passed into the ownership of BET. PUTCO became the second largest customer for ER series Olympics, taking 174.

From 1951 to 1958, Bus Bodies (South Africa) built 81 ER44 Olympics; none were exported from South Africa. Minimum seating capacity was 45 and the maximum was 67. Municipal users were Bloemfontein (2), Cape Town (8), Durban (15), Port Elizabeth (2) and Pretoria (1). The BET-owned PUTCO bought 32 and independents took fourteen, there were also four examples without initial registrations, presumably demonstrators or dealer stock.

From 1957 to 1971, 479 ER2s were produced at Port Elizabeth, post 1969 models were coded ER2A because they had the BLMC rationalised Pneumocyclic gearbox. Again the maximum seating capacity was 67.

Apart from four sold to Salisbury United in Rhodesia, during 1961 all of the Port Elizabeth built ER2s were for South African consumption. The largest customer was PUTCO who had taken both of the two series one options, their 174 accounted for 36% of all Port Elizabeth-built ER2 sales, next largest was Pretoria Municipal who took 132 (28%), customers for 87 (18%) are not listed, South African Railways took 30 (6%), Large Cape Town independents Bay Transport (28) and Greyhound (20) accounted for a further 10% whilst Benoni were the other local authority customer taking four.

=== South African Special ===
In the Leyland Bus book Doug Jack makes mention of a model built only by Bus Builders, this variant was known as the SA2. Eighty of these were built for South African Railways (SAR) in the 1960s. SAR, operating buses in difficult terrain and often at altitude, required very high power outputs for the time and wanted more than the 200 bhp available from the Leyland O.680H, presumably the 15.2 litre Leyland-Albion O.900H was not suitable for the application, or had ceased production, as the SA2 Olympic featured a 220 bhp Cummins engine coupled to Twin-Disc torque-converter transmission. Some of these were 6x4 versions with non-reactive rear suspension as on Leyland-group goods models of the time.

=== Right hand drive export models from Birmingham ===
From 1949 to 1970 the Elmdon lines were building Olympics by the hundred. The majority of these were left hand drive, and at the beginning of the type's production life Metro-Cammell also had major commitments to London Transport for RTL and RF bodies, as well as their base load business with Birmingham and other corporation fleets and with the BET group. As a result, from 1950 to 1957 only 58 ER44 Olympics were built, the one built in 1950 was an unseated development vehicle for Leyland.

The other 57, built between 1953 and 1957 were B44D examples for Jamaica Omnibus Service (JOS) of Kingston, they were the only customer for the ER2 to be served from the UK, buying 270 ER2/44 to B44D layout and 19 shorter ER2/34 (presumably to 18 ft wheelbase and 33 ft overall length) also with dual doors and seating 36 between 1958 and 1966, they also took 150 ER3 from 1966 to 1969, 5 were to shorter length ER3/41 spec and from the middle of 1968 the rationalised gearbox was fitted, the last models being ER3A/44. JOS gave class codes to their buses in the 1950s, the 1953 batch of ER2s were class C as were the first ten 1955 buses, subsequent ER44s were class G which also applied to ER2/44s, this suggests a break point of mid-1955 for the adoption of Worldmaster units within Olympic production. Jamaica Omnibus Service purchased 496 Olympics sold and had 15% of overall production.

=== ELs from Birmingham ===
All EL series Olympics were built at Metro-Cammell.

The rarest variant was the EL36, production totalled 31. One was exported to Teheran in 1951 (together with an EL40) as a demonstrator and as Doug Jack relates this prompted the Shah of Iran's Police Force to purchase thirty EL36s for police transport. These were built and delivered in 1953.

Total production of the EL40 was 182 (discounting four dismantled for spares) over the years 1949–52. Highest quoted seating capacity was for the EL40 was B40F. The largest sales were to South America; Fifty went to Montevideo municipal AMDET, and 26 to Montevideo-based independent CUTCSA; The municipalities of Buenos Aires and Córdoba in Argentina took 35 and 31 respectively, the next largest batch was of 12 for a Belgian dealer. Share of production by territory was as follows: Uruguay 41% (77) Argentina 38% (69) Canada 9% (17) Belgium 7% (12), Four for an Istanbul independent accounted for two per cent and the rest were single vehicles for Iran and Israel and a Leyland test vehicle. Iran looked to be a promising market and the EL40 demonstrator was sold to the Teheran municipality but at about the same time they also commissioned a report from the London Transport consultancy department, after that report they standardised on AEC chassis and Park Royal bodies. Some of the examples for Canada, including the four for Guelph had "torque-converter transmission of US origin". (GM Turbo-Hydramatic perhaps?)

Total production of the EL44 was 82, less 2 which were dismantled for spares, 6 of the 80 were kept by Leyland. Maximum quoted seating was B44D. Deliveries stretched from April 1951 to May 1960, the only major customer was CUTCSA who took 63; that sole Uruguayan order accounted for 78% of output, next were the six remaining in the UK, then Madrid Corporation's four (Madrid at the time also took Worldmasters and PD3 Titans with MCW bodies), two for Argentina, two for Cuba whilst one each went to Costa Rica, Turkey and Poland.

EL2 production was 1382 built at Birmingham from 1960 to 1967. Three (the last built) for the Dominican Republic are quoted as B45D whilst the buses for Buenos Aires had three doors and 44 seats. The major customer for the EL2 was Cuba which took 993 from 1960 to 1966, next largest was Buenos Aires with 242, then CUTCSA with 100, owners are unknown for two and three were sold to the government of the Dominican Republic. The first owner of the other 42 was Leyland Motors acting as insurer for the loss of the Magdeburg (see later), of those 42, 14 were lost at sea, 9 of the 28 salvaged went to an Australian operator Westbus, two to a British coach firm but the destinations of most of the remaining 17 are unknown. 72% of this the most successful variant went to Cuba, 18% to Argentina and 7% to Uruguay.

EL3 Production ran between 1966 and 1970; production of 497 went to two customers 60% to Istanbul and 40% to Cuba. The later Cuban examples were type EL3A with rationalised gearbox.

=== Cuban buses ===
When obituary writers looked for examples of the salesmanship of Lord Stokes upon his death in 2008, it was his sale of 1,192 Olympics to the government of Cuba that was most frequently mentioned. The Olympic was a standard type there until well into the 1990s and it is believed some are still running. 33% of all Olympic output went to Cuba, some as 44-seat dual door buses, the rest as 41-seat express coaches.

Two of them are still running in factories carrying workers to the sugarcane fields; although they are in very bad shape and have been repaired so many times, they are still doing service with original engine and transmission. There are still some parts cannibalized from the more than one thousand buses that arrived in Cuba from England between 1960 and 1970.

=== Buses meant for Cuba that went elsewhere ===
Not all of the buses meant for Cuba made it however; there were two shipping incidents. Firstly in 1960 a batch of 18 from an order of 200 were being unloaded at Havana docks when a French ammunition ship MV La Coubre in a nearby berth exploded. All 18 were damaged, but nine were repairable in Cuba, the rest being shipped back to MCW for repairs. Leyland lent one of these buses to Edinburgh who were anxious to try 11m single deck buses, following Glasgow's lead with their BUT/Burlingham trolleybuses two years earlier. This led Edinburgh to become the launch customer a year later for the Leyland Leopard PSU3.

In October 1964, the East German ship MV Magdeburg with 42 Olympics onboard bound for Cuba sank in the River Thames after colliding with the MV Yamashiro Maru. In the ensuing salvage operation 28 were removed and brought to land while the wreck was refloated and taken under tow to Greece, with 14 buses still in the hold. During a storm in the Bay of Biscay, the Magdeburg had to be cast adrift and sank for a second and final time.

The remaining 28 Olympics were all sold, some (doubtless) for spares and scrap, some for non-psv uses; one was converted by Tiverton Coachbuilders to transport racing cars for the Tyrell team, (Most other racing car-teams of the time used Worldmasters or Leopards, although Gulf used an AEC Regal VI and Lotus an AEC Swift.) other salvaged Olympics became furniture vans, Jack states 'at least one' was used as such in Europe. Some that were deck cargo were salvaged and sold. Australian operator Westbus purchased nine, two were used for parts, one placed in service with its MCW body while six were rebodied by CVI.

Two of the salvaged Cuban Olympics were purchased by Smith of Wigan who had underframes built into a pair of Van Hool coaches registered CEK587-8D which retained left hand drive and were used on the European sections of Smith's coach tours, only returning to Wigan in the off-season.

=== South America ===
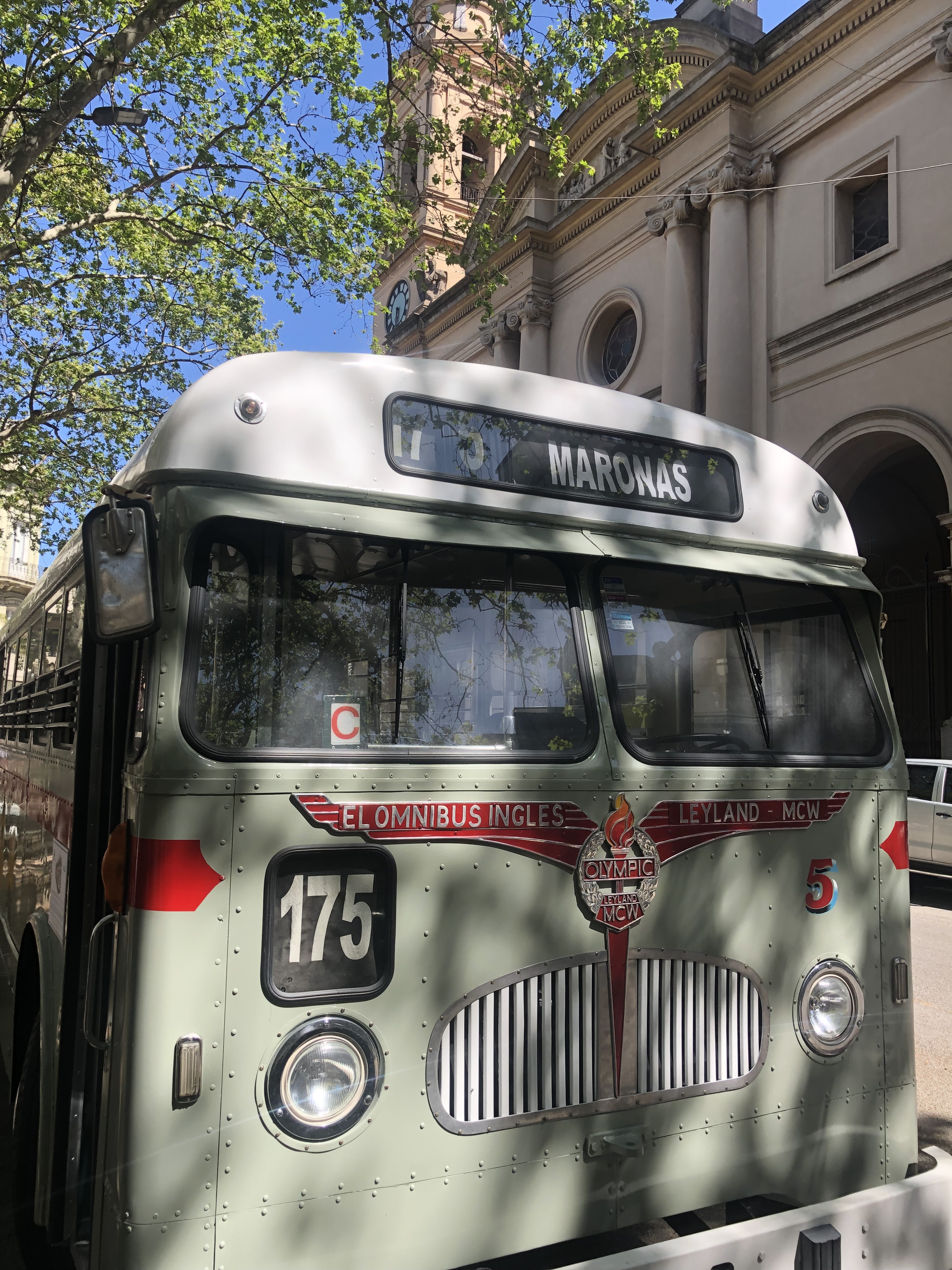
Leyland Olympic in Montevideo, Uruguay.

The Olympic was sold to two South American countries, Argentina and Uruguay.

Sales to Argentina amounted to 313. Of these all but 34 went to the Buenos Aires Municipality, most to a triple-entrance 44-seat design.

The Olympic was popular in Montevideo, with 240 entering service in the 1950s and 1960s. 50 of these were new to the Montevideo local authority, most of which passed to major independent and the other customer CUTCSA on privatisation. Some of the 240 were still in use as late as 2001 including a 1951 EL40 in use as a driver trainer; Additionally during 1962 and 1963, 70 units of the LERTW2 44 model were acquired by CUTCSA and 250 three door units of the same model were also acquired by AMDET for a total fleet renewal, AMDET units during its dissolution in 1975 were sold to recently formed Cooperatives COTSUR (103 units), RAINCOOP (70 units) and COPTROL (10 units) while another 53 units were given to pre-existen cooperative UCOT, the remainer was keep by AMDET's owners, the Montevideo Intendancy with some burnt down units in storage being to CUTCSA a few years latter while the still working units were keep by the Intendancy for internal transport until they were given to the cooperatives in replacement of totally lost units; The bulk of these units were retired in the 1990 decade following the creation of a leasing system for fleet renewals.

=== Turkey ===
Only 5 early Olympics were sold in Turkey and Leyland sales personnel discovered resistance to a name of Greek origin. So, the 300 B36D vehicles sold to the Istanbul municipal bus fleet in 1968/9 were named Leyland-MCW Levend, a word meaning a crack soldier.

=== Other destinations ===
UK sales (and Leyland retained vehicles) account for 101 Olympics (3%), including one non-psv. The rest of the world figure of 127 (4%) breaks down into: Iran 32, not known (includes at least 1 non-psv) 18; Canada 17; Rhodesia 15; shipwreck 14; Belgium 12; Australia 9; Spain 4; Dominican Republic 3, and one each to Costa Rica, Israel, New Zealand, Poland and Trinidad.

== Variants ==
=== Olympian ===
The Leyland-MCW Olympian, built from 1953 to 1957, was based on the Olympic superstructure, suitably lightened, and carried units from the Leyland Tiger Cub. 60 were built, all but one were right hand drive, the other being sold to the Chinese government.

=== Olympic Mark X ===
This was designed for a Canadian Motor Show in 1965. It had a restyled front entry centre exit body to 40 ft by 8 ft 6in dimensions with a long (22 ft) wheelbase and was the only rear-engined Olympic, having a vertical Leyland O.680 transversely mounted under the rear bench seat. Transmission was by a 90° gear train into a Spicer 'Torquematic' torque converter then into a modified Worldmaster style rear axle. It had a very comprehensive heating and ventilation system and an insulated body. Unlike other Olympics it had all-round air suspension. It demonstrated with the Toronto Transit Commission as #507 and a number of other Canadian operators (Burley Bus Lines and Chambly Transport). It was exhibited by the British Pavilion at Montreal Expo 67 but was not continued with although its driveline layout inspired the MCW Metrobus.

== Preservation ==
The much decayed remains of former King Alfred HR40 JAA708 were repatriated to the UK from dereliction in the Irish Republic in 1990 and Friends of King Alfred Buses announced one of the most ambitious and thorough going restoration attempts ever seen in the bus preservation movement which resulted in the bus being available to ride on at their Winchester running Day on 1 January 2013. The vehicle was severely damaged in a fire in December 2023, with a second restoration being announced in 2025.

One other HR40 Olympic is preserved. Isle of Man Road Services MMN302 and also one HR44 SPU985 New to Jennings of Ashen.

In South America, Uruguay has a restored Olympic that belongs to CUTCSA numbered as 5 (originally numbered as 248 but renumered latter as 566 in replacement of a newer unit but now numbered as 5 as its the list if long-running directory president Juan Salgado), while a second unit, the previous unit 803 of CUTCSA, is now property of Grupo ACLO (a bus fans association named by AEC's old Lationamerican exports brand). Both of these units are of the LERTW2 44 model but these were at request of CUTCSA manufactured with the older model's windshields
