= Leyland-MCW Olympian =

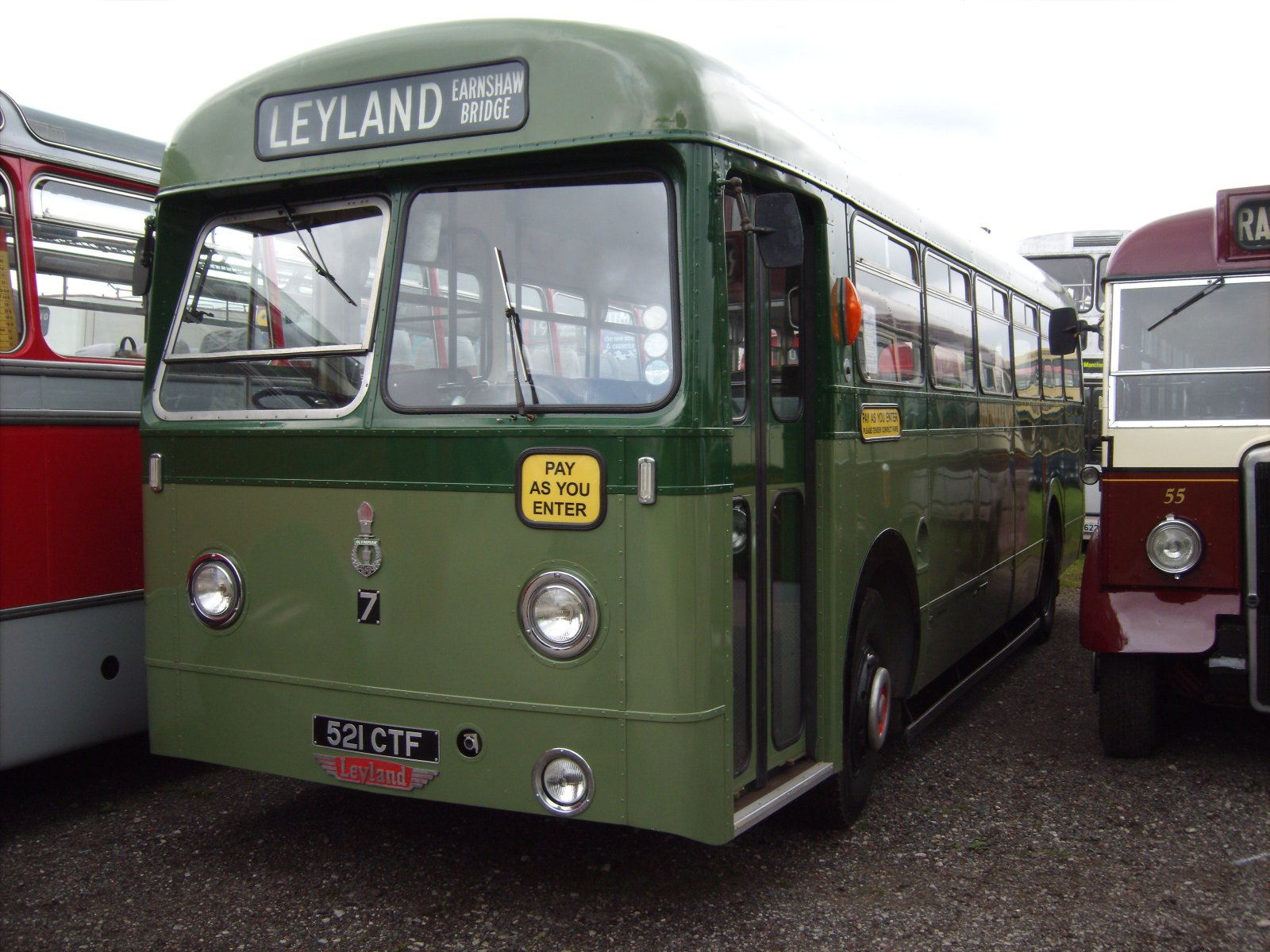
- Preserved John Fishwick & Sons' Leyland-MCW Olympian (521 CTF)

Overview
- Manufacturer: Leyland; Metro Cammell Weymann
- Production: 1954-1958

Body and chassis
- Doors: 1
- Floor type: Step entrance

Powertrain
- Engine: Leyland O.350H 6-cylinder horizontal diesel engine
- Capacity: 350 cubic inches (5.7 litres)
- Transmission: Leyland constant mesh, 4 speeds

The Leyland-MCW Olympian was an integral single-deck bus built by Weymann Coachbuilders of Addlestone for the Metro Cammell Weymann group using Leyland Tiger Cub mechanical units.

British Electric Traction subsidiary Western Welsh Omnibus Co took one in 1954, 40 in 1956 and six in 1958. Trinidad Bus Service had four in 1956 (the one pictured in the MCW official picture carries a Tiger Cub badge.) and John Fishwick & Sons took six in 1957. The 1954 show bus and prototype went to Jones, Aberbeeg whilst a single example was exported to Ceylon, the sole left hand drive example was sold to China in 1958, all 60 were single door.

The Olympian for China not only differed from the other 59 in being left hand drive, it was fitted with a Pneumocylic semi-automatic gearbox. Initially finished in cream and orange, it made landfall at Hsinkang and was used by the Beijing authority on experimental suburban express routes. No further were purchased and it seems not to have influenced the direction of Chinese bus design.

In his Classic Blunderbus column on the type in Classic Bus 63, the current Buses Magazine editor Alan Millar explained that it was a lightweight version of the Leyland-MCW Olympic, and as that used Leyland Royal Tiger or Royal Tiger Worldmaster components, so this used Leyland Tiger Cub units. The name Olympian was he says adopted because Olympic Cub would have sounded "plain daft"; that said Leyland coded the type HRC (or, for the sole left hand drive version, ELC) where HR or EL was a mnemonic for "Olympic" and C meant "Cub". Completed examples were only 3cwt lighter than Tiger Cub chassis with the same maker's body. In appearance there was little to tell them apart save that the Olympian was differently badged and had a water filler cap aperture mounted behind and slightly above the centre line of the nearside front wheel; The Tiger Cub's water filler cap was higher mounted and generally hidden by a sprung flap. With 60 built and six exported this was the least successful postwar Leyland single deck, none were built after the Chinese example even though Leyland Motors were still advertising its availability in a 1964 booklet. But Leyland kept hold of their registration of the name, and it came in handy for the Project B45 Leyland Olympian in 1980.

LW was the bodybuilder's identity for the vehicle, it could have stood for Leyland Weymann, or Light Weight, probably the latter. One of the Fishwick buses is preserved.
