= Leyland-DAB Lion =

Mid-engined double-decker bus

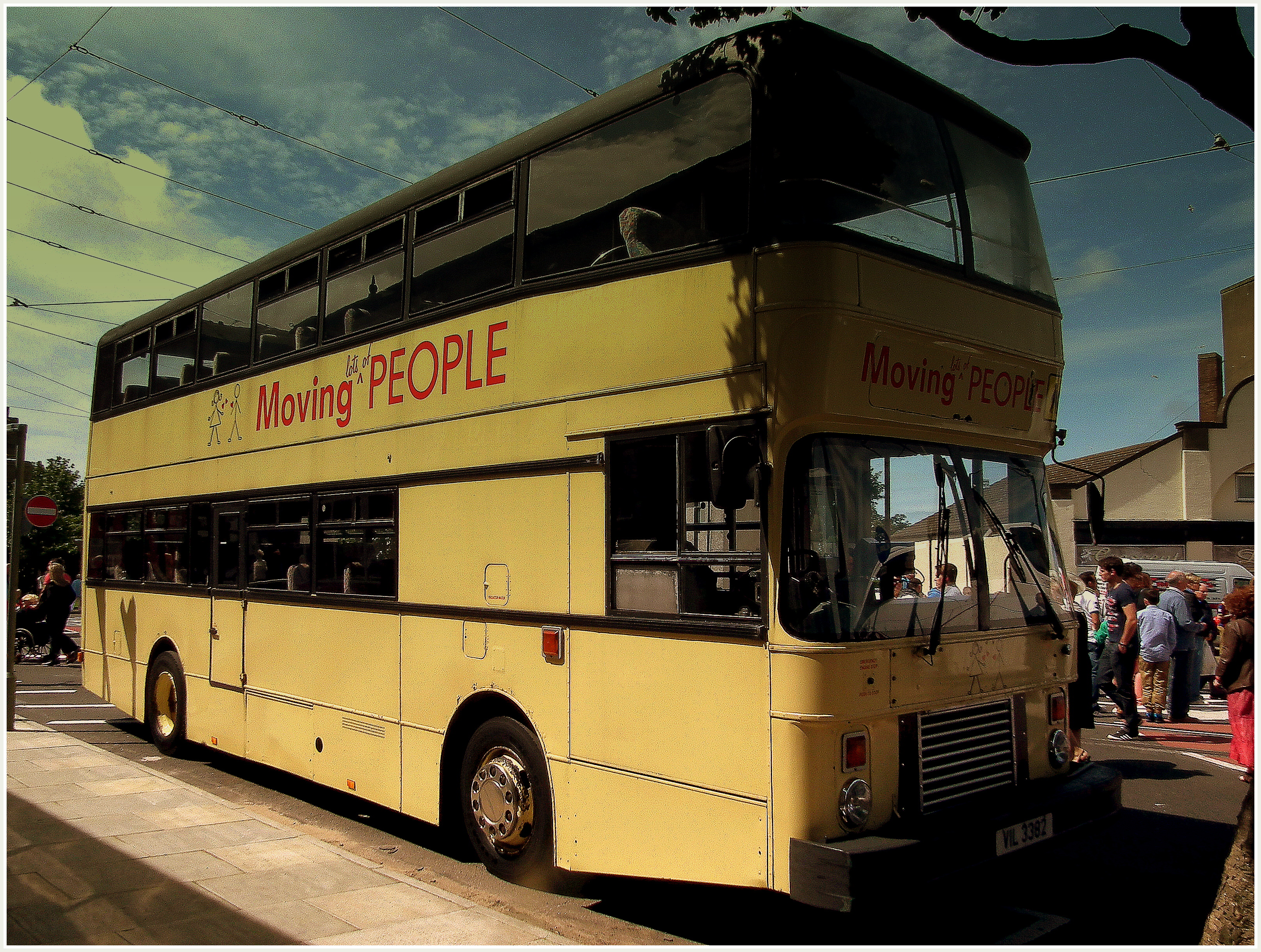
- East Lancs bodied Leyland-DAB Lion in 2012

Overview
- Manufacturer: Leyland
- Production: 1986–1988

Body and chassis
- Doors: 1 door
- Floor type: Step entrance

Powertrain
- Engine: Leyland TL11
- Power output: 183 kW
- Transmission: ZF Ecomat

The Leyland-DAB Lion was a mid-engined double-decker bus chassis manufactured by Leyland between 1986 and 1988.

== History ==
The Leyland-DAB Lion was designed as a mid-engined double-decker bus chassis based on a Danish Automobile Building design. Only 32 were built for Clydeside Scottish, Eastern Scottish and Nottingham City Transport.

Following the takeover of Leyland by Volvo, the Lion ceased production in 1988.
