= Vest Buss =

Former Norwegian bus and coach manufacturer

Vest Buss Gruppen AS
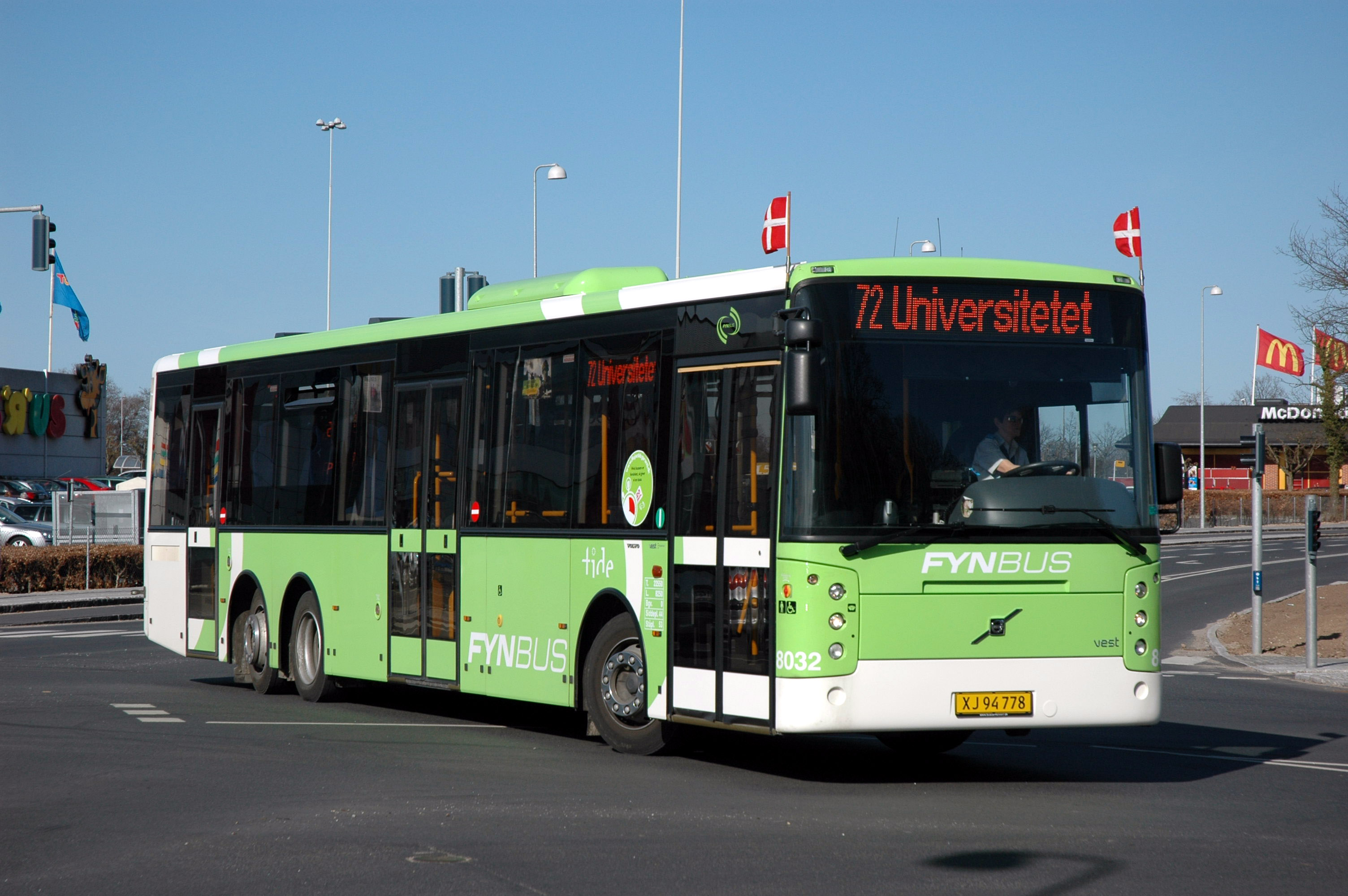
- A FynBus Vest Center H built on Volvo B12BLE 6x2, operated by Tide Bus in Odense, Denmark.
- Company type: Private
- Industry: Automotive
- Founded: 1965
- Defunct: 2011
- Headquarters: Stryn Municipality, Norway
- Areas served: Norway, Sweden, Finland
- Key people: Karl Anders Galfvensjö (CEO); Per Dag Nedreberg (Chair)
- Products: Buses and coaches
- Website: www.vest.no

Vest Buss is a former Norwegian bus and coach bodywork manufacturer, and at one time was the official distributor for Iveco Bus in Norway and Sweden.

The company was founded in Stryn Municipality in 1965 as Vest Karosseri AS, building their first bus bodywork in 1967. In 2002, the company was renamed Vest-Busscar AS, after Brazilian bus manufacturer Busscar acquired a 35% share. By 2006, Busscar had sold its stake and Vest-Busscar was renamed Vest Buss AS. In 2009, they became the official distributor for Irisbus in Norway and Sweden. In 2010, it was decided to close down the production of their own bodywork in early 2011, which was briefly continued by Vidre AS.

== Models ==
- Vest Ambassadør
- Vest Liner
- Vest V10/V25
- Vest V10LE/V25LE
- Vest Contrast
- Vest Center
- Vest Horisont
