= Leyland Lion PSR1 =

Overview
- Manufacturer: Leyland
- Production: 1960-1967

Body and chassis
- Doors: 1-2
- Floor type: Step entrance

Powertrain
- Engine: Leyland 0.600; Leyland 0.680
- Capacity: 9.8 litres 11.1 litres
- Power output: 125-200 bhp
- Transmission: Self-Changing Gears Pneumocyclic direct-acting semi-automatic, electric or air control, 4 or 5 speeds

Dimensions
- Length: 11 metres
- Width: 2.5 metres
- Height: 3 metres
- Curb weight: 5t 9cw(chassis) for 13.3 Tons GVW

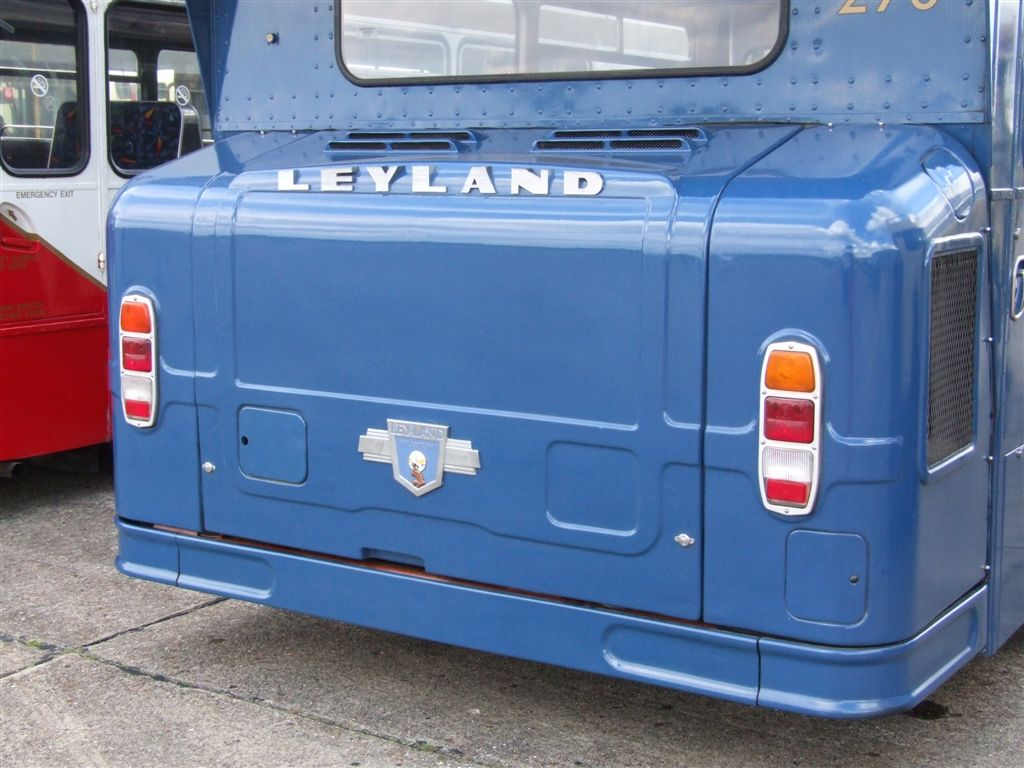
Leyland bus motor cover

The Leyland Lion, coded as PSR1, (or LPSR1 if Left Hand Drive) was a bus chassis manufactured by Leyland as its first production rear engined single decker. It was announced in 1960, although the first two were built in 1959. 56 LPSR1 and 28 PSR1 were sold to 1967 which was low for Leyland at the time. It was the third of five Leyland bus models to carry the Lion brand.

== Background ==
Having expended a large amount of time and money developing the Leyland Atlantean's transverse rear engine and Z-drive transmission, Leyland Motors sought further applications for it (the Dromedary 8x2 petrol tanker sold in the thousands, but only as a Lesney Matchbox toy; only one full size example entered service). By combining the Atlantean power-pack with a Leyland Royal Tiger Worldmaster chassis frame, Leyland produced a vehicle equivalent to North American transit buses. This was the Leyland Lion PSR1.

== Description ==
"Worldmaster + Atlantean = Lion

A WORLDMASTER chassis with an Atlantean rear end forms the basis of the new Lion passenger vehicle. Its layout is similar to that of foreign vehicles which have proved popular with coach operators, in that the underfloor space between the axles can be used for luggage accommodation."

The high straight chassis frame was made of high-duty steel channel sections and was similar to that of the Worldmaster. There was no differentiation between frames for bus or coach bodies. Springs, controls, and brakes were as specified for that model. The engine, transmission, radiator etc. were Atlantean-type components.

Standard power unit was the Leyland 0.600 with outputs from 125 to 140 bhp with the Leyland 0.680 rated at up to 200 bhp as an option, these were mounted vertically and transversely at the rear. The front axle was a Worldmaster unit and the rear was similar to the Worldmaster unit but with the driving head inverted. Leyland Self-Changing Gears Pneumocyclic transmission was offered in 4 or 5-speed versions, with electric or pneumatic control. Drive was transmitted from engine to gearbox through either a centrifugal clutch or in later models via a fluid-friction coupling which enabled a solid connection at higher road speeds. An Eaton two speed driving head to the axle was optional. For the Australian market only a third tag axle, mounted ahead of the rear axle, was also offered. This was based on the Worldmaster rear axle but without a driving head, and was fitted into a suspension system based on that of the Albion Reiver 6x2 lorry. The purpose was to reduce axle loading. Most of the 6x2 Lions went to the Western Australian Government Railways and had passenger and cargo bodies fitted.

An Atlantean style glass fibre bustle could be supplied to cover the engine, or coach-builders could enclose it, examples were built to both styles. Leyland mocked up a version of the bustle with fins and tail-lights from the contemporary Austin Cambridge A55 but this did not enter production.

== Sales ==
The model was launched at the Commercial Motor Show held at Earl's Court London in 1960. As no vehicles had by then entered service, the brochure carried pictorial artist's impressions rendered by three industrial design studios, one being Ghia and another being Cross Courtney The show chassis carried an elaborate pictorial Lion on a shield badge which became standard for the model. It featured a cutaway version of the 'Farina Fin' tail that had been mocked up at Leyland. Although said at the show to be purchased by Highway Products Inc of Kent, Ohio, USA, it was later dispatched to Leyland Iberica SA and became the Ayats bodied coach mentioned later.

Although designed with the North American market in mind, none were sold there. The largest customer was the Government of Iran who took 52 with local bodies resembling those of Mercedes-Benz and Magirus-Deutz vehicles entering service at the same time. Thirty were sold to Australia, including six three-axle versions. Black & White in Brisbane, Cumberland Coaches in Sydney, Sinclair's Bus Service in Melbourne and the Western Australian Government Railways purchased examples.

Two were sold to Nelson Suburban Bus Lines in New Zealand, two to Egged in Israel and one each went to Spain and Turkey. The Spanish one received a striking high-floor luxury body, that showed the Atlantean-style bustle, by Ayats, and was operated by Chacosa on the Alicante-Madrid line.

== Survivors ==
One surviving Lion was converted into a mobile home in New Zealand. Another mobile home, originally tri-axle Western Australian Government Railways DP76, remains in Western Australia. Another example (DP90) is preserved by the Bus Preservation Society of Western Australia.
