= Den Oudsten =

Former Dutch coachbuilder

Den Oudsten Bussen B.V.
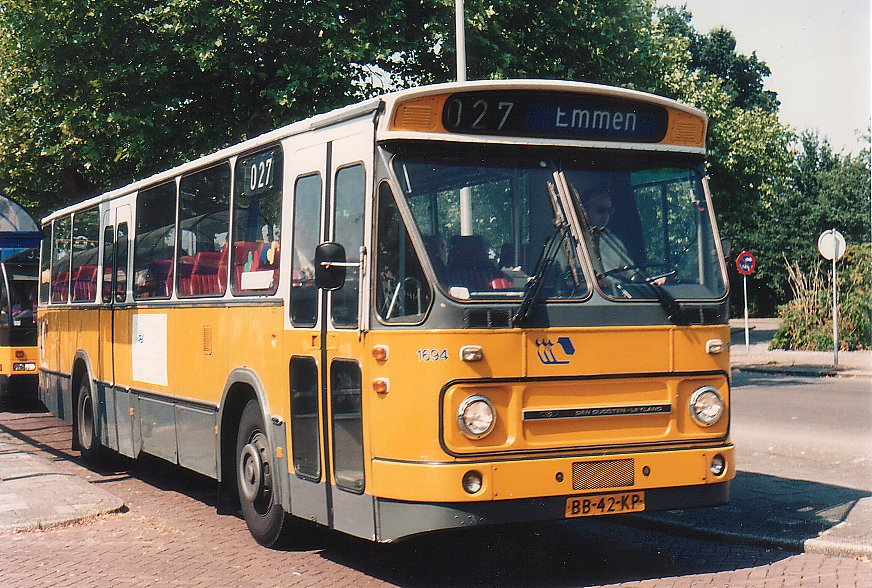
- A 1981 model of Den Oudsten
- Type: Private
- Industry: Coachbuilding
- Founded: 1926; 100 years ago
- Founder: Marinus den Oudsten
- Defunct: 2002
- Fate: Bankruptcy
- Headquarters: Netherlands

Den Oudsten Bussen B.V. was a Dutch coachbuilder and components manufacturer. The company was founded in 1926 by a local carriage-builder, Marinus den Oudsten. Its headquarters were just outside the city of Woerden. It eventually ceased all activities after being declared bankrupt in 2002.

The company, which was family-owned, had a profound influence on public transport in the Netherlands from the 1960s right up until the late 1990s. It mainly built coaches and bodyparts for buses that were assembled on chassis made by DAF, Leyland, Volvo, and Iveco.

In 1986 one of the family members, Jan den Oudsten, acquired a Canadian bus manufacturer and renamed it New Flyer Industries Ltd.. Den Oudsten Bussen BV was considered a separate company and had no institutional relations with New Flyer Industries. The official emblems of both companies were nevertheless identical. The Dutch company also cooperated with manufacturer Nova Bus Ltd to introduce and manufacture low-floor buses in North America.

Many older models of Den Oudsten buses that are no longer used in the Netherlands were shipped to other countries, where they can still be seen on local public transport duties. Den Oudsten buses have been spotted as far afield as Poland, Georgia, Azerbaijan, Nigeria, Vietnam, Trinidad and Tobago, Romania and Cuba. These exports were sometimes repainted, while others retained their original Dutch advertisements, numberplates, or transport company emblems.

The eventual bankruptcy of the company is believed to have been caused by the increasingly competitive nature of the market. Its household effects were sold in a public auction in 2002; the most notable highlights were the company's original 1962 Chevrolet Apache fire-engine and an unfinished prototype for its latest low-floor line.

Many bus enthusiasts in the Netherlands are attempting to preserve several of the old models for posterity.

Jan den Oudsten has died at the age of 92 on March 29, 2023.
