= Leyland Royal Tiger PSU =

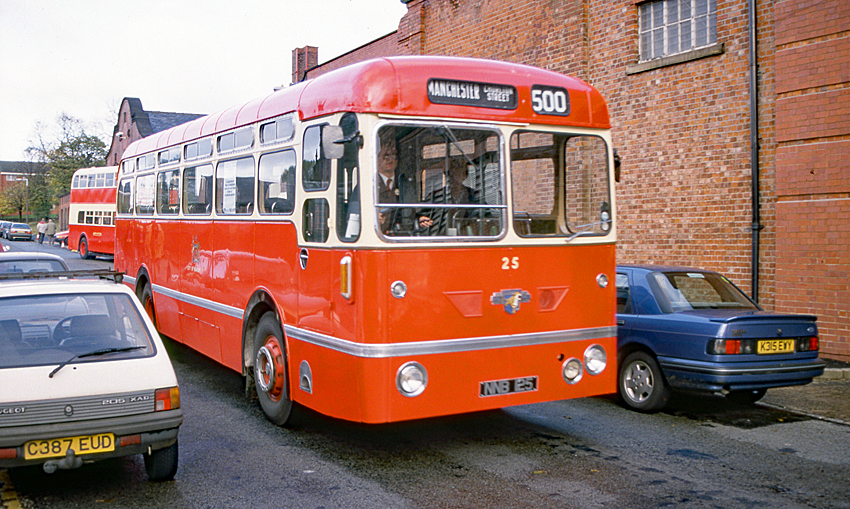
- Manchester Corporation Royal Tiger

Overview
- Manufacturer: Leyland
- Production: 1950-1954

Body and chassis
- Doors: 1
- Floor type: Step entrance

Powertrain
- Engine: Leyland O.600H
- Capacity: 600 cubic inches (9.8 litres)
- Power output: 125 bhp (93 kW) @ 1,800 rpm (optional 2,000 rpm limit)
- Transmission: Single plate clutch Leyland synchromesh 4 speeds, air-assistance to gearshift standard on OPSU, AEC fluid coupling and 4-speed air-servo preselector gear change optional on OPSU in some markets

Dimensions
- Length: 30 to 36 ft (9.14 to 10.97 m)
- Width: 8 ft (2.44 m) (7 ft 6 in or 2.29 m optional)

Chronology
- Successor: Leyland Royal Tiger Worldmaster

The Leyland Royal Tiger PSU was an underfloor-engined bus and coach chassis manufactured by Leyland between 1950 and 1954.

== Description ==
The Leyland Royal Tiger was an underfloor-engined heavyweight single deck bus or coach chassis, and sold well in the United Kingdom and overseas from launch. "Overseas" versions differed greatly from home market models. Upon launch in 1950 this was the fourth new marque of post-war Leyland single deck bus chassis since 1945. It used the same units as the Leyland-MCW Olympic but with a substantial steel ladder-frame chassis generally straight in elevation but with an up-sweep over the rear axle, to which operators could fit a coach-built body of their choice with the passenger floor about 3 ft (914 mm) above the road surface. The flexibly-mounted Leyland 0.600H horizontal engine was mounted in the middle of the chassis frame, driving back through a unit mounted single-plate clutch and four-speed gearbox with synchromesh on second, third, and top, or later only on third and top, to a spiral-bevel rear axle. Steering was unassisted Marles cam and double roller, all component assemblies (save for some special export orders) were built by Leyland and were proven, having been previously used in the Tiger PS2 and/or Olympic.

The last Royal Tigers were completed in 1956, by which time 6,500 had been built. In the home market it had been supplanted by the lighter Tiger Cub which was in series production by 1953 and rapidly overtook the Royal Tiger in popularity with British operators. Whilst export markets demanded even more ruggedness and power, so from 1954 the Worldmaster came on-stream to satisfy them.

Most notably the Royal Tiger was also the first post-war Leyland bus to feature a pictorial badge: a die cast bright metal item with a plated finish featuring a central shield carrying a coloured image of a charging open-mouthed Tiger on a black ground, this surmounted by ‘LEYLAND’ in inset red lettering, with ‘ROYAL’ and ‘TIGER’ on the left and right wings coming from the shield. Later bus models including the Tiger Cub, Worldmaster, Atlantean, Leopard, Lion (PSR1), Royal Tiger Cub, Panther and Panther Cub also featured this style of badge, some Leyland goods models also used the shield badge, including models with the LAD and early Ergomatic cabs and notably the sole Leyland/Thompson Brothers' Dromedary rear-engined fuel tanker.

== The home range ==
The Royal Tiger PSU1 was originally planned over eight variants PSU1/1 to PSU1/8 with a wheelbase of 15 ft 7 in (4.75 m) to suit the then UK maximum length of 27 ft 6 in (8.38 m), 8 ft (2,438 mm) width was allowed from 1948 but only on officially approved routes until 1950. Unlike the AEC Regal IV, no Royal Tigers were built to the initially planned length, because 30 ft length was made legal in the UK during 1950. The 30 ft (9.14 m) long Royal Tiger PSU1 as produced covered another nine variants with the same wheelbase but longer rear overhang. In tabular summary, these were as follows:

Type	Width	Brakes	Drop-frame	Notes
PSU1/9	7 ft 6 in (2,286 mm)	Vacuum	No	Bus
PSU1/10	7 ft 6 in (2,286 mm)	Air	No	Bus
PSU1/11	7 ft 6 in (2,286 mm)	Vacuum	Optional	Coach
PSU1/12	7 ft 6 in (2,286 mm)	Air	Optional	Coach
PSU1/13	8 ft (2,438 mm)	Vacuum	No	Bus
PSU1/14	8 ft (2,438 mm)	Air	No	Bus
PSU1/15	8 ft (2,438 mm)	Vacuum	Optional	Coach
PSU1/16	8 ft (2,438 mm)	Air	Optional	Coach
PSU1/17	8 ft (2,438 mm)	Vacuum	No	Special bus for standard Leyland body

Unlike the home market Olympic, launch orders were impressive, Ribble Motor Services indented for 120, Ulster Transport Authority requiring 111, Red & White Services 52, Wallace Arnold 22 and Associated Motorways (Black & White) 15. Wallace Arnold and Black & White exclusively required coaches, the rest required a mixture of bus and coach bodies, Ribble Motor Services, whose headquarters were in Preston, chose Leyland bodies also. As well as the option of a drop-frame aft of the rear axle, coaches also had as standard a higher final-drive ratio. Leyland demonstrators at the 1950 Earls Court Commercial Motor Show were a Brush-bodied bus MTC757 and an all-Leyland coach MTD235. The PSU1 was produced until 1954 but the last to be bodied on a new home market chassis went to Wigan Corporation in 1956. This Northern Counties bodied bus is preserved.

A large number of coachbuilders produced bodies for the Royal Tiger, most of them were standard buses or coaches, at the time underfloor engined single-deck buses with up to 45 seats generally had a single front entrance opposite the driver on the front overhang, often secured with a power-operated folding door; industry-standard coaches a central entrance in mid-wheelbase, generally with a manual sliding door, 41 seats was the general coach maximum, that said, there was a much greater variety of body styles and builders than today. Buses were built on Royal Tiger PSU1 by Brush, Crossley, Duple, East Lancashire Coachbuilders, Eastern Coach Works, Heaver, Metro Cammell Weymann, Massey Brothers, Northern Counties, Park Royal, Roe and others, whilst coaches were built by (among others) Alexander, Associated Coach Builders, Beccols, Bellhouse-Hartwell, Duple, Eastern Coach Works, Harrington, Metalcraft (who bodied the first two production coaches with 43 seat centre-entrance bodies for Don Everall of Wolverhampton), Mann, Egerton & Co., Plaxton, Samlesbury Engineering, Trans-United, Willowbrook and Windover. Perhaps the most famous body on the Royal Tiger coach was the Burlingham Seagull, but Dinky Toys chose the Duple Roadmaster body for their contemporary version, a style that was considerably rarer in full size than were 1:76 scale die cast metal models of it on railway layouts and in toy cupboards. Leyland’s own 44-seat bus and 41-seat coach bodies were built on a large number of Royal Tigers until Leyland's in-house coachbuilders were locked-out at the conclusion of an unofficial industrial dispute in 1954 bringing Leyland bus and coach bodies to an end. Although the 8 ft width was the majority choice most operators chose the vacuum-servo braking system, which was at its limits coping with a fully laden vehicle with an eight-ton unladen weight.

== The export range ==
Export Royal Tigers were different. Suffix numbers varied more than home market versions as an option for overseas variants was an AEC fluid coupling and air-actuated preselector gearbox combination as on the rival AEC Regal IV. Air brakes were generally offered, vacuum brakes and narrow track were rare options and an air-servo to the Leyland clutch and synchromesh gearbox was offered as standard on all air-braked layshaft-gearbox variants. Omitting suffixes the OPSU series can be tabulated thus:

Type	Wheelbase	Nominal bodied length
OPSU1	18 ft 6 in (5.64 m)	33 ft (10.06 m)
OPSU2	20 ft (6.10 m)	35 ft (10.67 m)
OPSU3	15 ft 9 in (4.80 m)	31 ft (9.45 m)

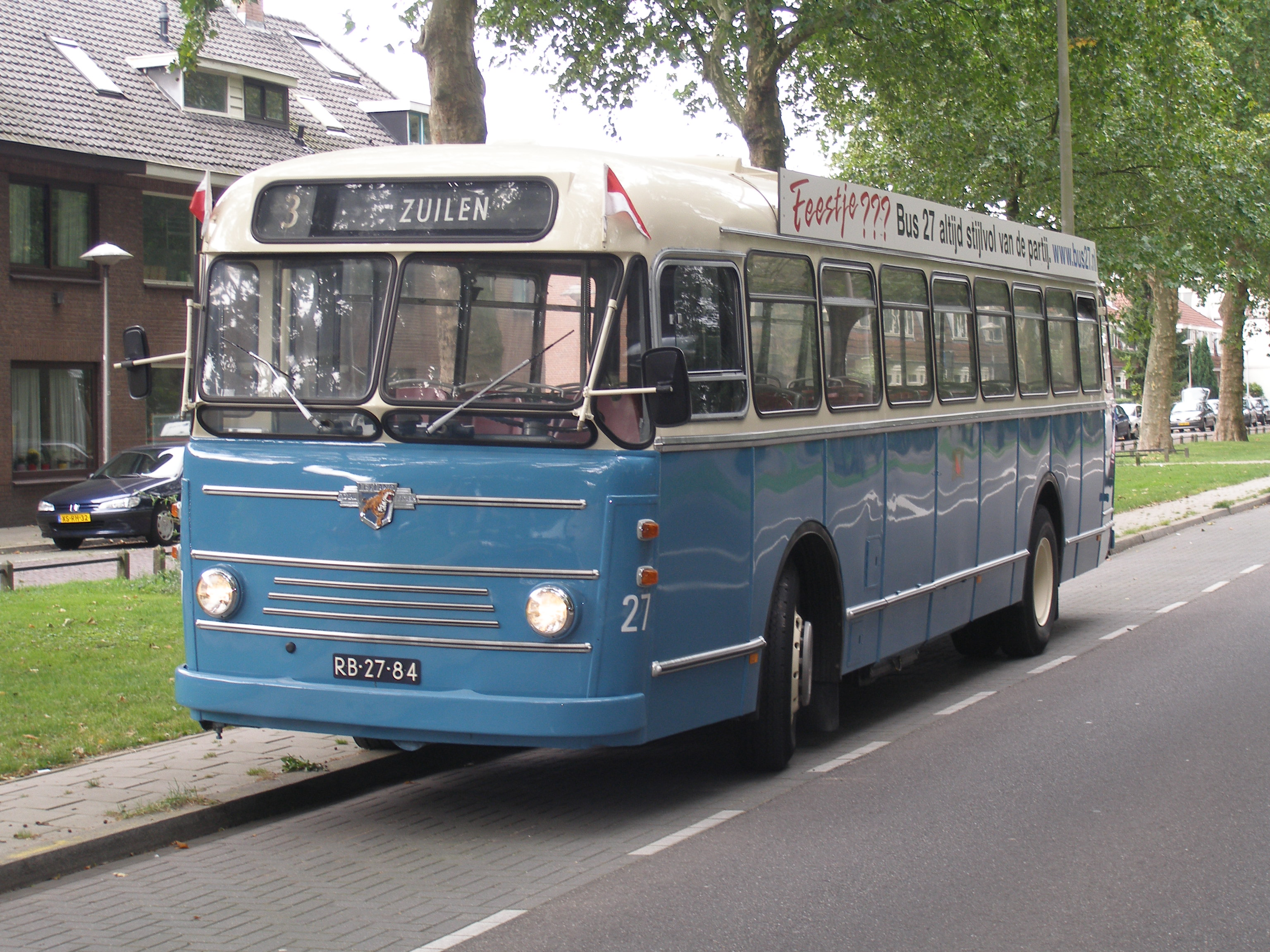
GVU Leyland-Verheul Royal Tiger 27 in the Netherlands

O stood for overseas and left-hand drive variants had an L prefix to the type code, Hence for example LOPSU2. Customers for the Royal Tiger were found on every populated continent, sales were however particularly high in Europe, the Middle East, South America and Australasia. All overseas markets took the OPSU series save Ireland. In the UK-administered six counties of Northern Ireland the Ulster Transport Authority constructed its own bus and coach bodies on 176 examples whilst cross-border operators Londonderry & Lough Swilly Railway, The Lough Erne Railway and the Great Northern Railway (Ireland) all took Saunders-Roe bodied PSU1 Royal Tigers, all to the rarer 7 ft 6 in (2,286 mm) width: CIÉ, the Irish Republic's government transport undertaking, after evaluating the coach demonstrator, took 8 ft 0 in (2,438 mm) wide PSU1 Royal Tigers with their own bodies, bus and coach, these forming the 200-strong U-class. The Irish Army also bought a single example, to transport regimental bands, this was also Saunders-Roe bodied it has a centre entrance is 7 ft 6 in (2,286 mm) wide, registered ZU5000 and delivered in 1953; it has recently been found by preservationists and is now stored awaiting restoration. The Lough Swilly operation still had their first Royal Tiger in revenue-earning service in 1979

The largest single Dollar-denominated order ever taken by a British manufacturer by that time was taken in 1950 by Leyland from Autobus Modernos SA of Havana, Cuba, who ordered 620 Saunders Roe B43D bodied LOPSU1/1s to replace Havana's trams. Buenos Aires, Argentina ordered 450 Royal Tigers and 300 Olympics at a Pound Sterling-denominated record for a UK vehicle builder of £4 million, by 1953 Brazilian operators had over 460 Royal Tigers in operation. Other early territories to take large numbers of overseas Royal Tigers were Australia, Egypt, Finland, India, Iran, Israel, Kenya, New Zealand, Nigeria, Portugal, South Africa, Spain, The Netherlands, and Uruguay. Denmark, Greece, Jamaica, Nigeria, Norway, Venezuela and Yugoslavia among others were later added to the list of territories taking the OPSU.

== Succession ==
In most of the rest of the world Leyland customers liked the Royal Tiger, but some found it insufficiently strong and some regarded it as underpowered. As a result, Leyland produced its most successful bus model, the Royal Tiger Worldmaster. In the UK, conversely, the Royal Tiger had an unladen weight often exceeding eight tons, more than that of double-deckers with up to twenty more seats, and as the gross vehicle weight was twelve tons in 1950, a full complement of luggage and passengers would take the coaches in particular close to the legal laden limit. Thus in 1952 Leyland launched a bus to the concept of the Royal Tiger but with a lighter-weight frame and units standardised with the Comet 90 medium-weight lorry. This was the Leyland Tiger Cub.

== Rebodies and other alterations ==
The durability of the heavy PSU chassis was often well in excess of the bodies it carried, several operators had their Royal Tigers fitted with new bodies, Harper Brothers of Heath Hayes, built their own bus bodies on some of theirs in the late 1950s, using Metal Sections frames. The only other operator-bodied Royal Tiger was McLennan of Spittalfield, Perthshire's EES468 a 1952 front-entrance 43 seat coach. Many other independent operators chose newer Plaxton bodies for their Royal Tigers from the early to late 1960s.

The most notable example though was the commercial lengthening and rebodying operation ran by Audlem, Cheshire based dealer Les Gleave Ltd. Between 1961 and 1964 they converted at least 20 Royal Tiger chassis to the full-length allowed by a recent change in the law, for a cost of £200 for the conversion work; these all received new registrations and a stretch in the wheelbase to 18 ft 6in, Gleave then sent the coach chassis to Scarborough for new 36 ft Plaxton Panorama bodies (one for Harrison of Morecambe, was shown at the 1962 Blackpool Coach Rally with the apt dealer re-registration 2048LG)(Audlem was covered by the Cheshire county vehicle licensing office whose index marks included LG).

Candidate chassis were initially only the air-braked PSU1/16 variant but some PSU1/15 were also lengthened and at the same time converted to air brakes, all the converted vehicles were coded PSU1/16/LG. Blue Bird coaches of Weymouth, Dorset lengthened their own HMR444 and also extended the original Plaxton body by nearly 3 ft. later Munden of Bristol re-bodied the extended chassis and re-registered it EHY111K This bus is still extant with third registration PJY2

As well as total rebodying, some operators in the late 1950s and early 1960s took mid-life central-entrance Royal Tiger coaches and modified them to dual-purpose (i.e. buses adapted for longer-distance service routes which could also serve as private hire coaches) by converting them to front from centre entrance. Single deckers by that time could legally be worked driver-only, which by halving staff costs saved some rural routes from abandonment. Harper Brothers of Heath Hayes mentioned above fitted very utilitarian fronts to some Burlingham Seagull bodied Royal Tigers for the purpose whilst Walter Alexander & Sons converted some of its Royal Tiger coach fleet in-house (those with Alexander bodies) and had two of its Leyland-bodied examples refitted with the contemporary (late 1950s) Walter Alexander Coachbuilders front end assemblies which produced incongruous-looking but doubtless useful service coaches.

== In service ==
The Royal Tiger on the home market was among the most powerful and quiet Public Service Vehicles yet encountered and very smooth-riding but vacuum brakes were not as efficient or as responsive as drivers desired from the outset: Wallace Arnold for one converted its vacuum braked Royal Tigers after a season or less in service, Southdown Motor Services did the same with their first batch of touring coaches, subsequently standardising on air brakes for all new buses and coaches regardless of builder. The home market Royal Tiger also lacked the air-servo assistance to the clutch or gearchange that the OPSU had and as a result clutch pressures were heavy and gear-lever throws were rather long, un-assisted steering was hard to move at low road-speeds, interviews with drivers of the Royal Tiger show they regarded the type as hard work to drive, but rewarding. Some operators swore by the Royal Tiger, but others swore at it. Barton Transport who had solely taken Leyland for all its full size bus and coach needs since the end of World War II bought five Leyland Royal Tigers with Burlingham bodies for its ‘Coach Cruise’ fleet in 1951 but the poor fuel consumption saw them sold three years later by which time Leyland's major rival AEC were getting their first orders from Barton since one Regal coach in the mid-1930s. However (see rebodies above) some operators found the near indestructible build of the Royal Tiger an asset and OK Motor Services of Bishop Auckland had a Plaxton rebodied Royal Tiger on regular service well into the 1980s.

== Preservation ==
A number of Royal Tigers are preserved, both bus and coach, in the southern hemisphere as well as the UK, at least one Les Gleave ‘stretched’ example among them, but the oddest preserved Royal Tiger might be JVB908, new to Homeland Tours of Croydon which carries a Mann Egerton body to Crellin-Duplex patent ‘Half-deck’ pattern; this carries 50 coach seats in facing pairs interlaced above and below a central gangway, it has recently been restored for its private owner by the Scottish Vintage Bus Museum. The Museum of Transport & Technology in Auckland, New Zealand has 1953 Leyland Royal Tiger PSU No.464 fitted with a Saunders Roe kitset body, one of 150 to be operated by the Auckland Transport Board, then Auckland Regional Authority until 1983. Presented in the ATB lettuce green and transport cream livery.

== Scale models ==
The only contemporary model was the Dinky Toys Duple Roadmaster. Rob's Classic Models produced Australian Government versions of the Leyland Royal Tiger Worldmaster in 1/76 scale in 2017, along with models of AEC Regal IV equivalents. Corgi Toys have since produced the Burlingham Seagull to 1/50 and 1/76 scales. Oxford Diecast now also offer a 1/76 scale model of the all-Leyland Royal Tiger coach and have recently announced a 1/76 Duple Roadmaster.
