= Leyland Royal Tiger Worldmaster =

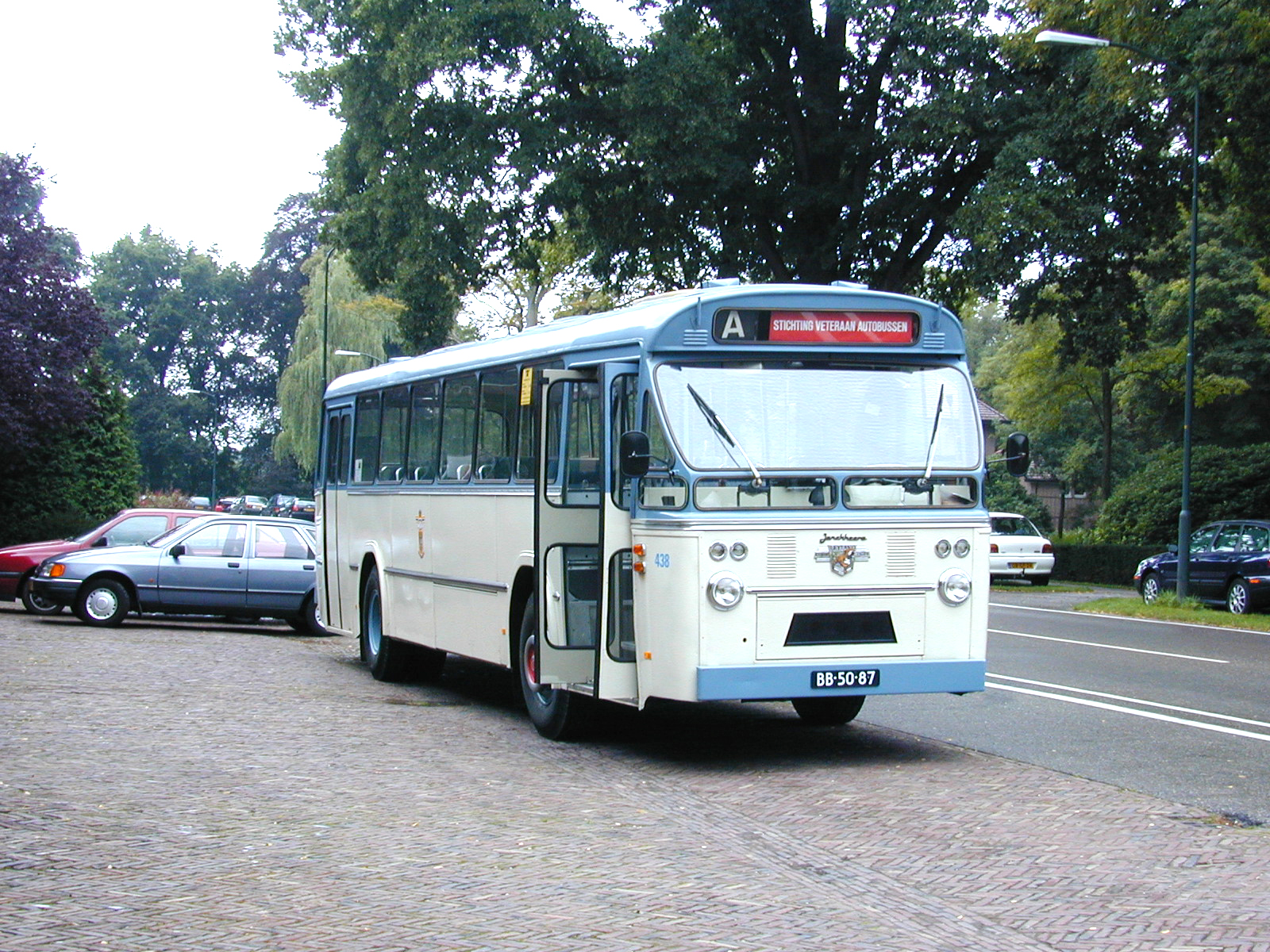
- Dutch Worldmaster with Belgian Jonckheere bodywork

Overview
- Manufacturer: Leyland
- Production: 1954–1979
- Assembly: Farington, England

Body and chassis
- Doors: 1, 2 or 3
- Floor type: Step entrance

Powertrain
- Engine: Leyland 0.600H; 9.8 litres (600 cu in); Leyland 0.680H; 11.1 litres (680 cu in)
- Capacity: 9.8 to 11.1 litres
- Power output: 125–200 bhp (93–149 kW)
- Transmission: Leyland Self-Changing Gears pneumocyclic direct-acting semi-automatic, 4 or 5 speeds

Dimensions
- Length: 9.1–12.0 metres (29 ft 10 1/4 in – 39 ft 4 1/2 in)
- Width: 2.5m
- Height: 3.0m

Chronology
- Predecessor: Leyland Royal Tiger
- Successor: Leyland Leopard

The Leyland Royal Tiger Worldmaster, sometimes simply known as the Leyland Worldmaster, was a mid-underfloor-engined single-decker bus or single-decker coach chassis manufactured by Leyland between 1954 and 1979.

== Description ==
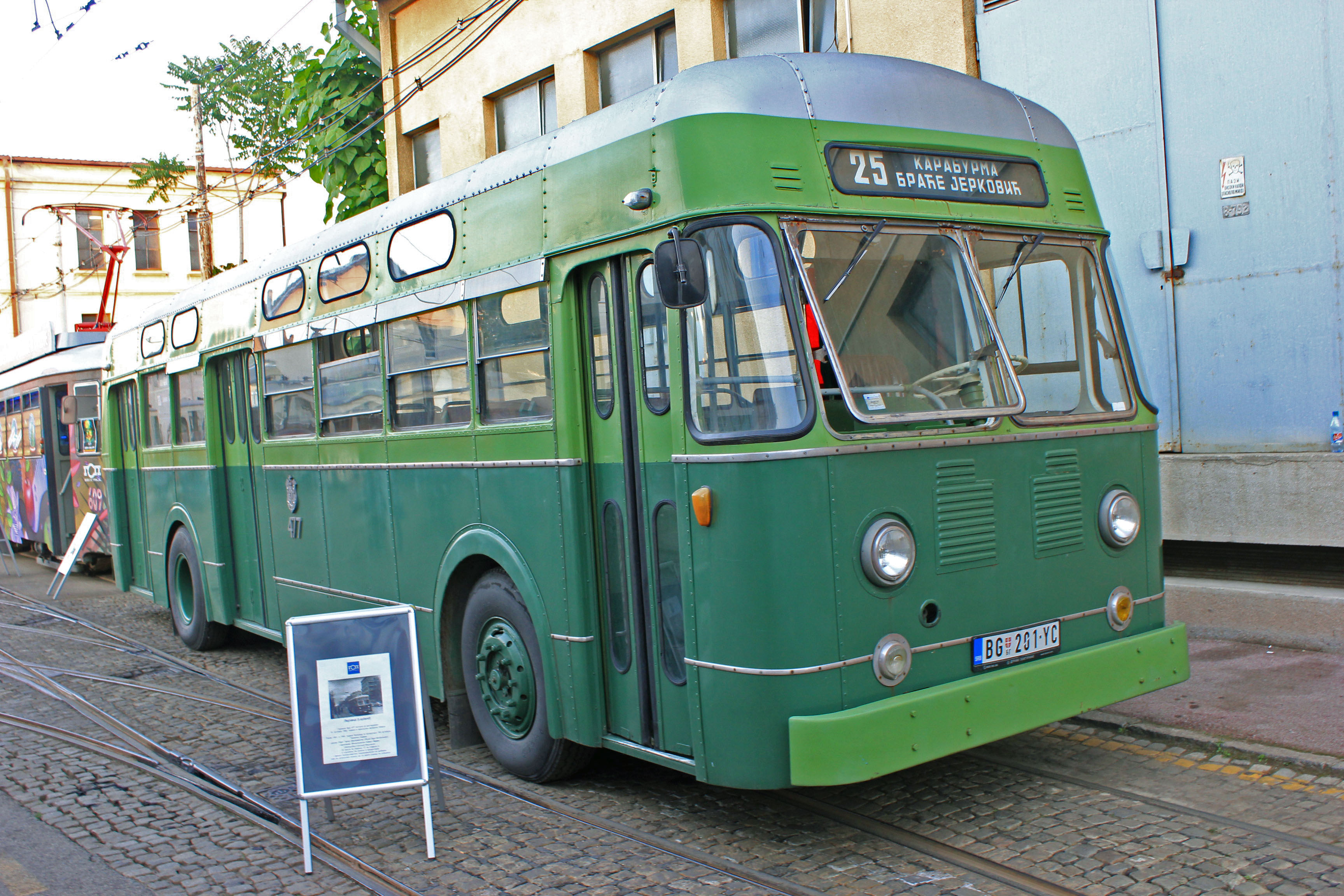
Serbian Worldmaster in Belgrade

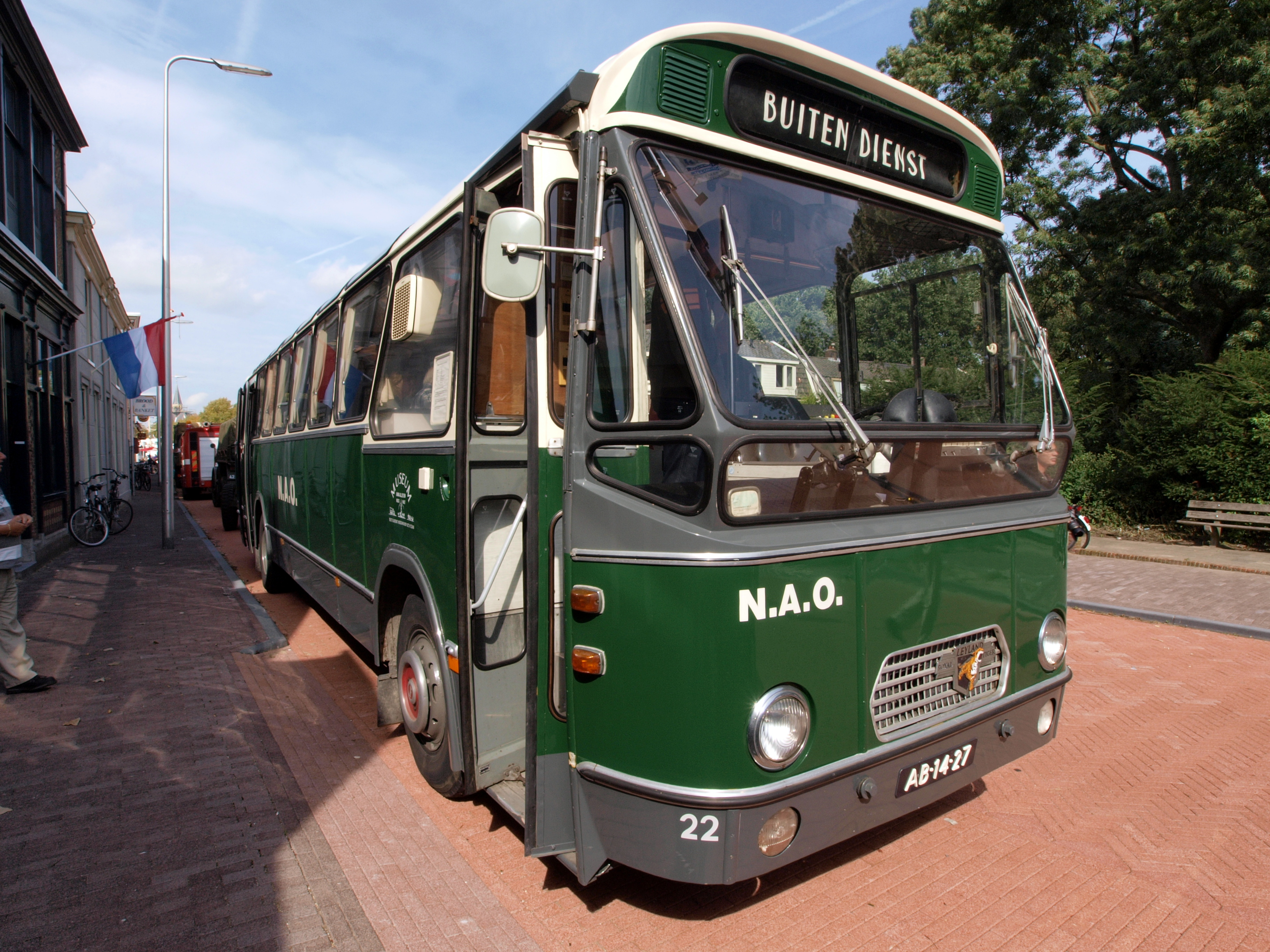
Dutch Worldmaster with Verheul bodywork

Succeeding the Leyland Royal Tiger underfloor-engined heavyweight single-decker bus or single-decker coach chassis which sold more than 6,000 from 1950 to 1956 was a difficult call, but Leyland answered it with the Royal Tiger Worldmaster, it retained a substantial steel ladder-frame chassis dropped in the wheelbase and overhangs and arched over the axles to which operators could fit a body of their choice. A Leyland O680H horizontal engine (the smaller-volume 0.600H was optional but rarely chosen) was mounted at the middle of the chassis frame, driving back through a pneumocyclic semi-automatic gearbox to an overhead-worm rear axle, steering was via a worm and nut mechanism.

Sales ran from 1954 to 1979 by which time more than 20,000 had been built making it Leyland's most successful bus. In comparison, by 1985 approximately 17,000 Leyland Atlanteans had been built, Leyland Leopard sales terminated in 1983 after deliveries totalled over 12,000.

In global terms only the Ikarus 260 and 280, Bedford SB (45,000 over thirty-eight years) ‘Old Look’ and "fishbowl" GMC single-deckers (around 40,000 each), and the Mercedes-Benz O303 (38,018 over 18 years) beat the Worldmaster for overall sales. The Worldmaster was an unequivocal success for Leyland and an aptly named model.

== The range ==
Leyland coded the Worldmaster RT, export versions were prefixed E, unless they had the low ground-clearance frame, prefixed C, designed for paved-road markets which required lower step heights, this had a different method of spring attachment to give the lower height. Left-hand drive Worldmasters were either LERT or LCRT, to tabulate the basic range:

Model	Wheelbase	Overall length	Notes
RT1	20 ft (6.10 m)	35 ft (10.67 m) (nominal)	Up to 12 m (39 ft 4 1/2 in) in real life
RT2	18 ft 6 in (5.64 m)	33 ft (10.06 m) (nominal)	11 m (36 ft 1 1/8 in) bodies by 1962
RT3	16 ft 2 in (4.93 m)	30 ft (9.14 m) (nominal)	Only type marketed in UK

Operators in every inhabited continent bought Worldmasters, big markets were western and southern Africa, Australia, South and Central America, the Middle East (notably Israel), the Caribbean and Continental Europe, both Eastern and Western bloc.

== Home market ==
Very few Worldmasters were sold in the United Kingdom. Glasgow Corporation took 30 RT3/1 from 1956 with Weymann body frames finished by the corporation's skilled tram-builders over the next two years. Halifax Corporation took ten with complete Weymann bodies in the same year.

Other than these two batches, the only home-market orders for Worldmasters were for the RT3/2 coach version, which attracted a small band of devoted followers comprising Gliderways of Smethwick, Smith's Tours of Wigan and Ellen Smith Coaches of Rochdale. Gliderways used Harrington coach bodies whilst the Lancashire operators had Plaxton body theirs. Between these three fewer than ten coaches were sold, at the time the Leyland Tiger Cub and AEC Reliance dominated the underfloor-engined single-deck coach market. The arrival of the L1/2 Leyland Leopard in 1959 followed by the PSU3 version in 1961 confined UK-registered Worldmasters to a trickle of undelivered export chassis, one of which (an ERT2/2) went to Happiways of Manchester in 1963, bodied by Duple (Northern) in the former HV Burlingham factory. Like Smith of Wigan, Happiways became part of today's Shearings coach operation.

The RT3/2 was withdrawn from home market sale in 1961 and the RT3/1 in 1964.

== Export ==
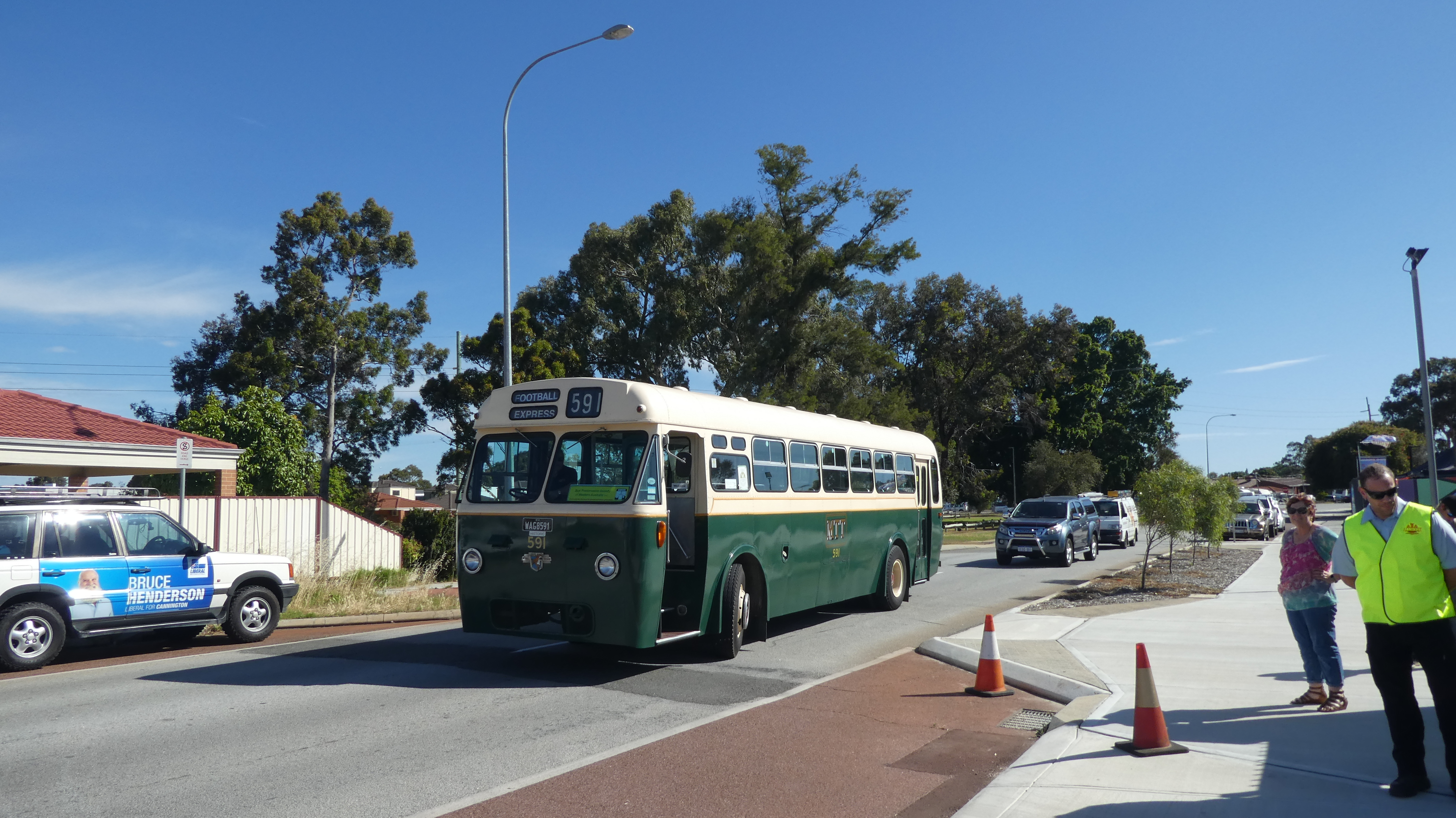
Preserved Metropolitan Transport Trust Worldmaster in Perth.

North America and the UK were the only areas in the world in the 1960s and 1970s where a passenger was unlikely to find a Worldmaster. Israel was the largest market with more than 5,000 in service, most of them had locally built bodies. More than 3,600 chassis were built at the Leyland Ashdod plant in Israel. They served as interurban, urban, coaches and even as trucks. Many were re-bodied during the 1980s. In India, Portugal and Spain examples even had double-deck bodies fitted. Almost all markets produced their own styles and makes of coachwork, for example Casaro of Italy produced a Ghia-styled coach on LERT2 with a flamboyant grille, ribbed anodised-aluminium skirt panels and large tail fins. This was reproduced as Matchbox Toys number 40, "Leyland Royal Tiger Coach". Ayats in Spain produced an LERT1 whose frontal aspect resembled the Edsel car, and many other coachbuilders made pan-continental names bodying the Worldmaster, DAB in particular, able to respond in 1959 to a short-notice order from Poland's state tourism authority, became favoured by and eventually taken over by Leyland. Other globally notable coachbuilders to body Worldmasters include Ha'argaz and Merkavim in Israel, Jonckheere, Van Hool, Marcopolo, Custom Coaches and New Zealand Motor Bodies.

Rhodesian Railways specified a 6x2 version of the Worldmaster with Leyland-Albion non-reactive suspension for the rear bogie. By 1960 Leyland South Africa developed a version of the Worldmaster with front-vertical engine, but this was discontinued after the 1962 merger with AEC in favour of the stronger-selling AEC Kudu. Later the Guy Victory J and the Albion Clydesdale were available for this market sector. A notable use of Worldmaster units was in two BUT 9641T trolleybus chassis, formerly London Transport Q1 class vehicles, that the Santander Trolleybus company rebuilt to 11-metre (36 ft 1 1/8 in) length with extended front overhang.

Eventually the PSU3 and 5 Leopards relegated the Worldmaster to markets requiring very heavy-duty chassis. Australia and New Zealand gradually converted to the Leopard from the first half of the 1960s whilst Worldmasters continued to dominate sales in the Nordic areas of Europe until at least 1971 but thereafter even Norway and Finland took to the Leopard (Sweden preferring its own Scania and Volvo chassis). From the mid-1970s West Africa was the last stronghold of substantial Worldmaster orders, Lagos Municipality in particular favouring the type, using Marshall and Willowbrook dual-door bodies to an outline resembling British Electric Traction standard Leyland Leopards but with bigger tyres, greater ground clearance and an inherent toughness of character no Leopard ever possessed.

== Rebodies ==
Ellen Smith found its two Worldmaster RT3/2s too good to scrap after a decade of high-mileage use, instead they were fitted with new Plaxton bodies in 1968 and 1970, the latter coach is preserved. CIÉ did the same with its 17 WT class ERT2 touring coaches in 1970–71, removing the seven-year-old CIÉ/Ogle Associates bodies and sending the refitted chassis to Belgium where they received new Van Hool Vistadome bodies, as the WVH class they continued to serve CIÉ well, the last examples being retired in 2002, examples of the WVH class are also preserved. Some former Glasgow Worldmasters were sold to Australia in the early 1970s, extended to 11 m (36 ft 1 1/8 in), and rebodied.

Egged in Israel rebodied 40 buses in the early 1980s, and named them "MOLEDET".

MTT (Metropolitan Transport Trust) in Perth, Western Australia, rebodied their 1957 Worldmaster, fleet number 21, in 1967, the bus stayed in service until 1982. MTT 21 is now preserved in original livery as a travelling museum, Shark in a Bus containing a preserved 5 m (16 ft 4 7/8 in) Great White Shark.

Many former Australian Public Transport Commission and State Transport Authority Worldmasters upon withdrawal, were rebodied by private operators including Brisbane Bus Lines, Deanes Coaches, Delwood Coaches, Fearne's Coaches, Menai Bus Service, Toongabbie Transport, Ventura Bus Lines and Westbus up until the mid-1980s. Many operated into the 2000s and a few were still in service in 2014.

In the late 1970s and early 1980s Uruguay's capital Montevideo's bus operators CUTCSA (the most frequent Leyland client in Uruguay) and COTSUR rebodied multiple Worldmaster chassis with unsatisfactory results citing it was expensive and produced an mechanically aged product; CUTCSA rebodied the chassis sourced from heavily damaged and/or burned down buses at its own workshops with their in-house designed Banda Oriental (name used by the Spanish Empire for their former Uruguayan territories) family of bodies while COTSIR its units 18 and 95 rebodied by.Carrocerias "La Victoria" (The Victory Bodyworks) in a model of body named "Ñandu Metropolitano" (Metropolitan Rhea) followed years latter by an in-house modification of units 39,68 and 90

== Firemaster ==
A 12 ft 6 in (3.81 m) wheelbase version of the Worldmaster with 0.680H engine, five-speed gearbox and two-speed rear-axle with the radiator relocated to the UK nearside just ahead of the rear-axle was sold from 1958 to fire-appliance builders as the Leyland Firemaster, the unique selling-point being that a water pump with power take-off from the transmission could be fitted at the extreme front of the chassis allowing the Firemaster to nose-in to incidents and be ready to deploy water hoses in half the time of conventional front-engined fire engines. Only Manchester and Glasgow Fire Brigades really took to the idea and the project was dropped by 1962–3 as it had proved unprofitable.

== Royal Tiger Cub ==
For many markets in Western Europe the LOPSUC1 Tiger Cub was underpowered and the LCRT3 Worldmaster too heavy, thus in 1960 the 17 ft 6 in (5.33 m) wheelbase Royal Tiger Cub LRTC was launched for 10-metre (32 ft 9 3/4 in) bodies with 0.600H engine and option of either synchromesh or Pneumocyclic transmission. Worldmaster-type axles and ten-stud wheels were used in a frame derived from the export Tiger Cub. A right-hand-drive version went to New Zealand, Australia and to Doncaster Corporation who took ten manual RTC1/1 in 1965 and ten semi-automatic RTC1/2 in 1967/8 in both cases with dual door Charles H Roe 45-seat bodies, the PSU3 Leopard was more closely related to this model than the preceding L1/L2. The PSU4 Leopard replaced both the Royal Tiger Cub and the L1/L2 Leopard by 1968.

== The end ==
By the mid-1970s Leyland were losing global bus and truck sales, particularly to Mercedes-Benz, Scania and Volvo, and tied-down by the dead weight of the British Leyland car division, no cash was available for an updated replacement for the Worldmaster. It was replaced by the Leyland Leopard in 1979, the last Worldmasters were bodied in the early 1980s and some are still in service.

Later export-only Leyland single deckers were to find much less success, the B21 and B52s not proving strong sellers, the rear-engined Leyland Tiger amounting to one demonstrator, and the B82 Ranger comprised 34 chassis, one 12 m (39 ft 4 1/2 in) long and the rest 10 m (32 ft 9 3/4 in), all of which were sold to CUTCSA of Montevideo, Uruguay (a major Olympic and Worldmaster customer) who built their own bodies for them.
