= H. V. Burlingham =

Former British coachbuilder based in Blackpool

Duple (Northern)
- Formerly: H. V. Burlingham (1928–1960)
- Industry: Coachbuilding
- Founded: 1928; 98 years ago
- Founder: Herbert Victor Burlingham
- Defunct: 1969
- Fate: Merged into parent company
- Headquarters: Blackpool, Lancashire, United Kingdom
- Parent: Duple Motor Bodies (1960–1969)

H. V. Burlingham was a British coachbuilding business based in Blackpool, Lancashire from 1928 until 1960 when they were taken over by London-based rivals Duple Motor Bodies. Duple initially renamed Burlingham as Duple (Northern) but in 1969 they closed their Hendon factory and concentrated production in Blackpool. Duple coach bodies were built in the former Burlingham premises until Duple itself was liquidated in 1989.

== History ==
=== Beginnings ===
Herbert Victor Burlingham moved to Blackpool in 1928 and after deciding to set up as a coachbuilder initially leased premises in Bloomfield Road and Bond Street in Blackpool. Like rivals Thomas Harrington Ltd in Hove and Plaxton in Scarborough, H. V. Burlingham understood that a seaside resort offered advantages for the highly seasonal trade in luxury coach bodies in that the workforce were able to take other jobs during the summer when there was no work for them building coaches. General coach building was the initial purpose of Mr Burlingham's business and the first body constructed was a van for a local butcher but coach bodies were soon the company's main product, initially of the 'all weather' style common at the time which comprised a steel-reinforced wooden frame panelled in aluminium with windows capable of winding fully down and a full-length folding canvas roof. An option common on many builders' coaches at the time was a luggage rack mounted on the rear of the roof, but Burlingham were early in offering coaches fitted with a toilet compartment, which was a long way from being the standard fitment in long-distance coaches it is now. Burlingham coaches soon began to make a name for themselves and unlike many coachbuilders of the period whose clientele was very localised, Burlingham were soon selling not only to Lancashire coach firms but to Scottish Motor Traction of Edinburgh, Walter Alexander of Stirling and Glenton Tours of London among others. Output in these early years kept outgrowing factory space, and in 1929 the original sites were relinquished in favour of a workshop in Bank Road, Marton, which was used until 1931. A factory was constructed at Preston New Road on the outskirts of the town in late 1929. After the Marton workshop was sold further premises were bought in Newhouse Road, these being used both to build components and to repair and recondition bodies.

=== Under new ownership ===
In 1930 Herbert Victor Burlingham, who had been a sole trader, decided to sell the business to two local businessmen, Richard Eaves and Harry Lowcock. They set up H. V. Burlingham Ltd on 25 November 1930 with a registered share capital of £26,000. after which H. V. Burlingham himself set up in business as a caravan manufacturer in Garstang. Mr Eaves became the managing director and took great pride in motivating the design team. Styles were developed into the era of the saloon coach often now fully enclosed, windows only dropping to half depth and a sliding aluminium or folding canvas roof section optional. Pioneering styling features often appeared on Burlingham designs, including the use of curved sightseeing windows above the main windows. By the end of 1931 there was again pressure on space so a further site was acquired at Vicarage Lane. This was used for body assembly and from then until eventual closure finishing was undertaken at the Preston New Road factory, which also manufactured sub assemblies. Once Vicarage Lane came on stream Newhouse Road was solely devoted to servicing existing bodies.

To extend business bus bodies were also offered. Among the first were a batch of central-entrance 33-seaters on Leyland Lion chassis for Blackpool Corporation. By the time of the 1932 sales brochure double-deck designs had been prepared, Blackpool Corporation again being the first customer, taking four rear entrance 48-seaters in that year. By 1935 Blackpool Corporation and Burlingham had developed streamlined fully fronted centre-entrance bodies, single- and double-deck, open- and closed-top, which were as futuristic as the corporation's English Electric and Brush tramcars. Also in 1935 the first export Burlingham bodies are reported for an Egyptian customer, and also that year a batch of very conservative-looking bodies were constructed for John Fishwick & Sons of Leyland. These were on Leyland Titan TD4 chassis and were to the Leyland outline as produced on Titan from 1929 to 1932, incorporating Leyland components. In following years Fishwick were persuaded to take a more modern outline as built for Ribble.

Among the more radical coaches of the time was a 25-seater on a normal-control Leyland Cub chassis for Marshall of Blackpool, which had a streamlined near-full width bonnet with concealed radiator, similar in shape to the Chrysler Airflow car. Duple had used a similar idea on a special airmail van for the Royal Mail (famous as a Dinky Toy) a year or so before the Marshall's coach but were never to apply the style to a coach body. Another mid-1930s design to give coachbuilders a chance to be creative was the Maudslay SF40, with its set-back front axle and design for modern full-width bodywork. Burlingham produced a number of very flamboyant styles on this body. Like Duple, Burlingham were prepared to build to practically any outline the customer requested, and as a result in 1939 Duple were building (1936) Burlingham outline coaches on Bristol chassis for Black and White Motorways whilst Burlingham built to (1937) Duple outlines on Bedfords for Bournemouth Corporation in 1938 and 1939. Among trademark Burlingham features however were ornate shaped window frames and the use of decorative stained glass work, often used when toilet compartments were fitted to coaches but also used to illuminate the stairwells of the pre-war Blackpool centre-entrance double-deckers. From 1937 to 1938 a revised coach style began to evolve with no canopy over the bonnet of half cabs and a near semi-circular window to the sliding forward entry door with the main applied decoration a slim curved side-flash, the whole coach curving gracefully in the idiom of the post-1936 Duple design, but being distinctively Burlingham in its sharper details, and especially in its rear aspect which was v-shaped in plan about the centre-line of the divided rear window. This was adapted to suit normal control chassis such as the Austin K4 and even used in a centre-entrance version on the Maudslay SF40 but, like the contemporary Duple style it was to become better known after World War Two.

=== In wartime ===
By the end of 1940 Burlingham were instructed to cease coach building and concentrate on war work. For the duration Preston New Road works and the assembly shop at Vicarage Lane were to produce airframe assemblies for Vickers Wellington medium bombers, which were assembled at a Vickers shadow factory on the site of today's Blackpool Airport. As well as this work the Newhouse Road workshop built mobile canteens on Austin chassis for the armed forces and produced a limited number of utility-design bodies for half-cab single-deckers. Although such chassis were not produced under the utility scheme some chassis were assembled from remaining stock parts or from export orders impossible to deliver, and in 1941-2 Burlingham built bus bodies for 15 such chassis and in 1943-5 again built bodies to replace worn out or war-damaged ones. Customers included Barton Transport, East Kent and United Automobile Services. During early 1945, before other coachbuilders, Burlingham were allowed to reintroduce compound curvature to the rear-dome of its bus body designs, as it had a crude, but effective, pressing machine for this task, unlike other coachbuilders, who required skilled panel beaters to do the work.

=== Post war prosperity ===
Like all other coachbuilders, Burlingham had a bulging order book at the end of the War, many operators having placed orders for completion as soon as peacetime conditions applied. The first post-war coach was completed in January 1946 and was very similar to the 1939 design, but featured an extra window pillar in each body side. Burlingham was justifiably cautious. as adequately seasoned timber for framing was very hard to obtain at the time. During 1946, a standard single-deck and double-deck bus body was introduced. The double-decker was basically the Ribble-type pre-war outline, whilst the single-decker could be best described as the utility frame re-clothed with traditional refinements such as compound curvature on front and rear domes and outswept skirt panels. Output of all three types was large, with many operators, such as Ribble and Walter Alexander, not only buying new chassis (for which a substantial waiting list had built up) but also sending pre-war vehicles to Burlingham for new bodies.

By late in 1948, Burlingham was able to begin to move away from its enforced policy of rigid standardisation, helped by a couple of longstanding and influential customers. Local British Electric Traction subsidiary Ribble Motor Services was responsible for the largest share of inter-urban routes in Lancashire, and wished to make more efficient use of its crews on limited-stop services running from the great industrial conurbations in the South, Centre and East of the county, to the seaside resorts in the West. As a result, they commissioned a double-deck lowbridge coach body with 49 seats on 30 Leyland Titan PD1/3 chassis, to the newly authorised 8-foot width. These had full fronts, electrically operated platform doors and coach trim, as well as luxury seating; the outline was generously curved, as were the window outlines. These became famous as the first of Ribble's 'White Lady' coaches. Ribble also took the same outline but with a half cab and 53 bus seats for service duties over the next few years. Scottish Motor Traction, seeking to publicise the return of peacetime standards on its Edinburgh-London coach service, chose a special Burlingham body for display at the 1948 Commercial Motor Show. This was mounted on the new AEC Regal III coach chassis and had a full front, with the AEC radiator hidden behind a chrome grille arrangement, the whole front of the coach tapering in plan, so that a single full-width windscreen with opening upper section could be fitted, rather than the traditional vertically divided style (as on pre-war fully fronted designs). The ensemble was completed by bulbous front and rear wings and a pair of low-set rectangular headlights. No other bodies were quite like that show coach, but it pointed the way to the future. Incidentally, SMT took Ribble-style double-deck bodies from Burlingham on 20 AEC Regent III chassis in 1950, which incorporated Ribble's post-war style of destination and number-blind glazing, to an irregular hexagonal outline – basically a triangle with the corners chopped off. This style of destination glazing spread over the next few years to become the double-deck standard throughout the Scottish Bus Group until the 1980s.

By mid-1949 further bespoke styles were being built. Burlingham had not built trolleybus bodies during the boom in popularity of such vehicles in the 1930s, but received a contract from Portsmouth Corporation to body 15 British United Traction (BUT) 9611T two-axle vehicles in 1949. These followed the operator's ideas on appearance and were generally less bold in outline than the Ribble-style double-deckers, but the operator's idea of enclosing the support gantries for the trolley-booms inside the roof-structure resulted in a top-heavy look, whilst the plentifully lined-out livery and features like an offside destination indicator added to their archaic aspect.

In contrast, the pre-war Blackpool Corporation/Burlingham style double-decker was actually in advance of much of what had been produced until this time and Blackpool waited until 1949 for chassis, so it could get what it wanted from Leyland. This was a unique variant of the Titan PD2 with 8-foot width, air brakes, a straight frame rather than a dropped frame aft of the axle and modified positioning of equipment, and a re-profiled nearside frame member, to especially adapt all 100 of this Titan PD2/5 sub-type for their Burlingham fully fronted centre-entrance bodies. These were, though wider, similar to the final pre-war examples of the style in having powered sliding entrance doors and concealed radiators but omitting the stained glass illumination of the stairwell.

Similar options were now offered on the standard coach, becoming available in two widths, with a full front that kept the traditional radiator outline, or in the case of the Foden the manufacturer's grille, or in a version with a decorative frontage like the SMT show coach, but with wider cab front and normal glazing. SMT took some half-cab bodies on pre-war Leyland Tiger and AEC Regal chassis, with full canopies over the half-cab to display a bus-style destination aperture. The majority of Burlingham coaches went on the full-sized heavyweight half-cab coaches of the day, but some bodies were built on the normal-control Commer Commando and Leyland Comet models.

Not everyone took to the new Ribble style, so for some customers a version of the pre-war Ribble outline was kept available until the early 1950s. Salford Corporation took aspects of the 'white lady' design and hybridised them with features of their standard post-war body, the resultant bodies combining straight staircases and other Salford body features with the generously radiused windows that were becoming a Burlingham trademark.

Unlike Thomas Harrington Ltd, Metro Cammell Weymann, Saunders-Roe or Duple, Burlingham did not build up an extensive export trade. In 1950, a batch of Leyland Tiger LOPS4/3s went to the operator of the Cordoba-Roasario-Buenos Aires express service in Argentina; these showed only a few Burlingham details in their fully fronted straight-waisted coachwork. The only other export customer was the Johannesburg municipality, who took some old-style highbridge double-deck bodies on Daimler chassis in 1951. The Argentinean coaches did, however, break important new ground for Burlingham, in that they used all-steel rather than steel-reinforced ash framing. Metal framing was to be a major facet of Burlingham's new range of bodies for the new underfloor-engined single-deckers such as the Royal Tiger and the AEC Regal IV.

=== The coach with the bird on the side ===
At the 1950 Earls Court Show Burlingham had two new coach designs on Royal Tiger and AEC Regal IV chassis, both shown with a luxury 37-seat seating plan in their central-entrance bodies, when 39 or 41 would have been the more likely choice of all but the most-upmarket customers. The designs were related, having similar detailing and windscreens, and an identical cast chromium-plated frontal motif, but the AEC had traditional teardrop-shape wheel-arch mouldings and a straight waist rail with vertical window pillars, whilst the Leyland had a curved waist rail, window pillars angled back from the vertical and an ellipsoid moulding sweeping from the front to the rear of the coach; this feature was known internally as the 'tank panel' because of its resemblance in shape to a World War One tank. This second coach was finished in the livery of its customer Woods of Blackpool, who traded as Seagull Coaches. Show visitors asked Burlingham for the style with the seagull on the side, and this (despite some chagrin at Woods) soon evolved into the marque name for the style. The previous body was still available for vertical-engined heavyweights but also to the new 30 ft length, and only in full-front form, with the tank-panel and front chrome motif as options. 1951 would be last season of a style with its origins in the late 1930s. For the Seagull, though, it was the start of a prosperous decade. In 1994 it came second in the Classic Bus reader poll to find the most attractive coach body style of all time. It was by far the most successful type of coach body for the early underfloor-engined chassis, selling well on Royal Tiger, Regal IV and Daimler Freeline chassis, Daimler choosing the Seagull style for LKV218, its coach demonstrator. Two were also fitted to Foden rear-engined coaches. From 1952 variants were introduced for vertical-engined chassis, starting with a style for the initial Bedford SB, a 35-seat version with a lengthened rear overhang. Shortly afterwards Scottish Omnibuses (as SMT had become) requested a version to fit Bedford OB chassis converted to forward control; these were known as 'baby Seagulls' and went to SOL and its Highland Omnibuses subsidiary. SOL also took Seagulls to rebody formerly half-cab AEC Regal IIIs. Others who ordered very large numbers of the style were Ribble and many other BET group members and independent coach operators, the largest customer from that sector being Wallace Arnold.

A small Wiltshire Coachbuilders, Heaver of Durrington who were best known for Albion Victor buses supplied to Guernsey Railways and Guernsey Motors, constructed two 'NewMark' coaches in 1953 on a Leyland Royal Tiger and in 1955 on a Daimler Freeline, these being a near exact copy of the Seagull.

=== 1950s buses ===
Burlingham also produced a service bus body for the new chassis; this had a simple outline but generally came with the brightwork motif on the front and with optional chrome trim strips along the sides. Among the stranger examples were a batch for Bournemouth Corporation in 1953, which had a double-deck-style open rear entrance and a front exit with doors. The open platform did not work well with an underfloor-engined bus and as in Sheffield, Edinburgh, Pontypridd and West Bromwich, the Bournemouth buses were converted to front entrance layout. Manchester Corporation started a spell as a Burlingham customer with the purchase of a batch of split-level coaches for its airport service: the first six were on Leyland Royal Tiger chassis in 1953 and, like the contemporary British European Airways' AEC Regal IVs, carried the roof line from the raised rear passenger section through to the front of the bus. Of this batch three were completed at Blackpool and the other three were sent as framed chassis to be finished by S. H. Bond of Wythenshawe. Three similar bodies came on Tiger Cub chassis in 1956. Manchester then took double-deck bodies which were similar to the mid-1950s Ribble outline but highbridge with a more upright front to fit the maximum number of seats in a 27-foot-long bus. These were taken on 62 BUT 9612T trolleybuses and 80 Daimler CVG6 and Leyland Titan PD2 buses. Ribble's mid-1950s design had a sliding rear platform door. After the large order in 1949/50 Blackpool took no more new buses until 1956, when it took five rear-entrance Titans with full fronts. These were highbridge with open platform but of similar styling to the Ribble vehicles. The single-deck body was developed for lighter-weight underfloor-engined chassis such as the Leyland Tiger Cub, AEC Reliance and Guy Arab LUF from 1953. For urban operators starting to experiment with driver-only operation a centre exit door was optionally available, this was specified by Sunderland and Reading Corporation amongst others. In 1956 double-deckers were allowed to be as long as single-deckers (30 ft or 9.2m), and a double-decker could now seat 72. Ribble were immediately attracted to the idea and placed 105 Burlingham 72-seat highbridge bodies on Titan PD3/4 chassis into service during 1957/58. These had full fronts and a sliding entry door just behind the front wheel. Wolverhampton Corporation took one identical body on a Guy Arab IV whilst another but with half-cab and exposed radiator went to Samuel Morgan of Armthorpe Yorkshire. Scout Motor Services bought 5 PD3s similar to the Ribble models in 1958/59 but with half-cabs, these buses passing to Ribble upon their purchase of the Scout business in 1961. Sunderland District Omnibus Co took a batch of 13 rear-entrance exposed-radiator Titan PD3 in 1958, and Western SMT took lowbridge rear-entrance tin-front PD3s in 1960 these were the last double-deck motorbus bodies built in Blackpool. The single-deck bus body styles began to diverge from the mid fifties with some operators such as Sheffield Transport looking for more coach-like vehicles while Reading sought a design better suited to moving large numbers of standing passengers. Before the end of Burlingham's independence, there was an important development with trolleybuses, as Glasgow Corporation ordered a batch of ten single-deck 50-seaters on BUT RETB1 chassis. These were Burlingham's only electrically powered single-deckers and the longest single-deckers yet seen in Britain.

=== Diminishing returns ===
Burlingham sought to facelift the Seagull every two years or so to keep up with rival coach builders but every time a change was introduced some of the original purity of line went with it. Whilst late Seagulls on Reliance or Tiger Cub chassis could still look good, the Seagull Mk 7 was launched at the 1958 motor show but only 20 were built on underfloor heavyweight chassis, the versions for Bedford SB, Commer Avenger or Ford Thames Trader PSVs began to assume a very strange appearance, the strangest perhaps being the version known internally as 'The Pig' which was fitted with a shallow two-piece wrap-around windscreen. Launched in 1958, it was at the limits of glazing technology, yet less than a year later Plaxton and Duple had designs with deeper and better looking windscreens supplied by the same company.

Burlingham realised there was nowhere left to take the style, which by now had reverted to steel reinforced timber frames for the lightweights and from 1959 launched a new range of bodies. These were the Seagull 60 for front-engined lightweights and the Seagull 70 for underfloor-engined chassis. By August 1960, Duple Motor Bodies Limited had acquired 100% of the share capital of H. V. Burlingham Ltd at a price of £550,000.

=== Afterlife ===
Although H. V. Burlingham was renamed Duple (Northern), existing body designs continued to be sold under the Burlingham name, these included more Reliance standee buses for Reading, a final batch of double-deck trolleybuses on Sunbeam F4A to a forward entrance design, also for Reading and two restyles of the body for lightweight coaches, the Seagull 61 and the Gannett. After that, some further Blackpool designs were introduced, primarily the Continental, Alpine Continental and the Firefly/Dragonfly, but these were badged as Duple (Northern) Products. Burlingham had ceased to be.

== Preservation ==
Examples of Burlingham Buses and coaches survive in preservation, including most marks of Seagull (including at least one 'pig') TBS21, one of the Glasgow single-deck trolleybuses is about to take its place in Glasgow's brand new Riverside Transport Museum when it opens in spring 2011. The Ribble Vehicle Preservation Trust have 1955 PD2/12 1467 under restoration and 1957 PD3/4 1523 in their care.

== Scale models ==
Corgi have produced the Seagull in both 1/50 and 1/76 scales. There have also been white metal kits of the Manchester, Reading and Glasgow trolleybus styles and the final Ribble Titan outline. And a 1/76 kit of the postwar single deck bus is also available. Oxford Die Cast are to make the sun saloon full-fronted vertical-engined coach style available in 1.148 scale during 2011.

== On Screen ==
The 1980s Miss Marple series in an episode called Sleeping Murder featured a fictitious coach firm called Daffodil Coaches, its fleet included a preserved Bournemouth Corporation Tiger PS2.

== In a novel ==
In Jasper Fforde's 2007 comic novel First Among Sequels. The heroine of the novel, Thursday Next, finds herself in the laboratories of her arch-enemy, the industrial monolith Goliath Corporation who decided they would develop a vehicle to transport coach parties of rich tourists into novels:

"In the centre of the room and looking resplendent in the blue and yellow livery of some forgotten bus company was a flat-fronted single deck coach that to my mind dated from the fifties…

"Why base it on an old coach?" I asked...

"If you're going to travel, do it in style. Besides, a Rolls-Royce Phantom II doesn't have enough seats."

...I moved closer to the front of the coach and ran my fingers across the Leyland badge atop the large and very prominent radiator. I looked up. Above the vertically split windscreen was a glass-covered panel that once told prospective passengers the ultimate destination of the bus. I expected it to read 'Bournemouth' or 'Portsmouth' but it didn't. It read: 'Northanger Abbey'...

"The Austen Rover is a standard Leyland Tiger PS2/3 under a Burlingham body," she began, touching the coachwork fondly, "but with a few…modifications. Come aboard."
