= Thomas Harrington & Sons =

English coachbuilders

- Founded: 1897
- Founder: Thomas Harrington
- Defunct: 1966
- Headquarters: Hove
- Products: Bus bodies
- Owner: Rootes family

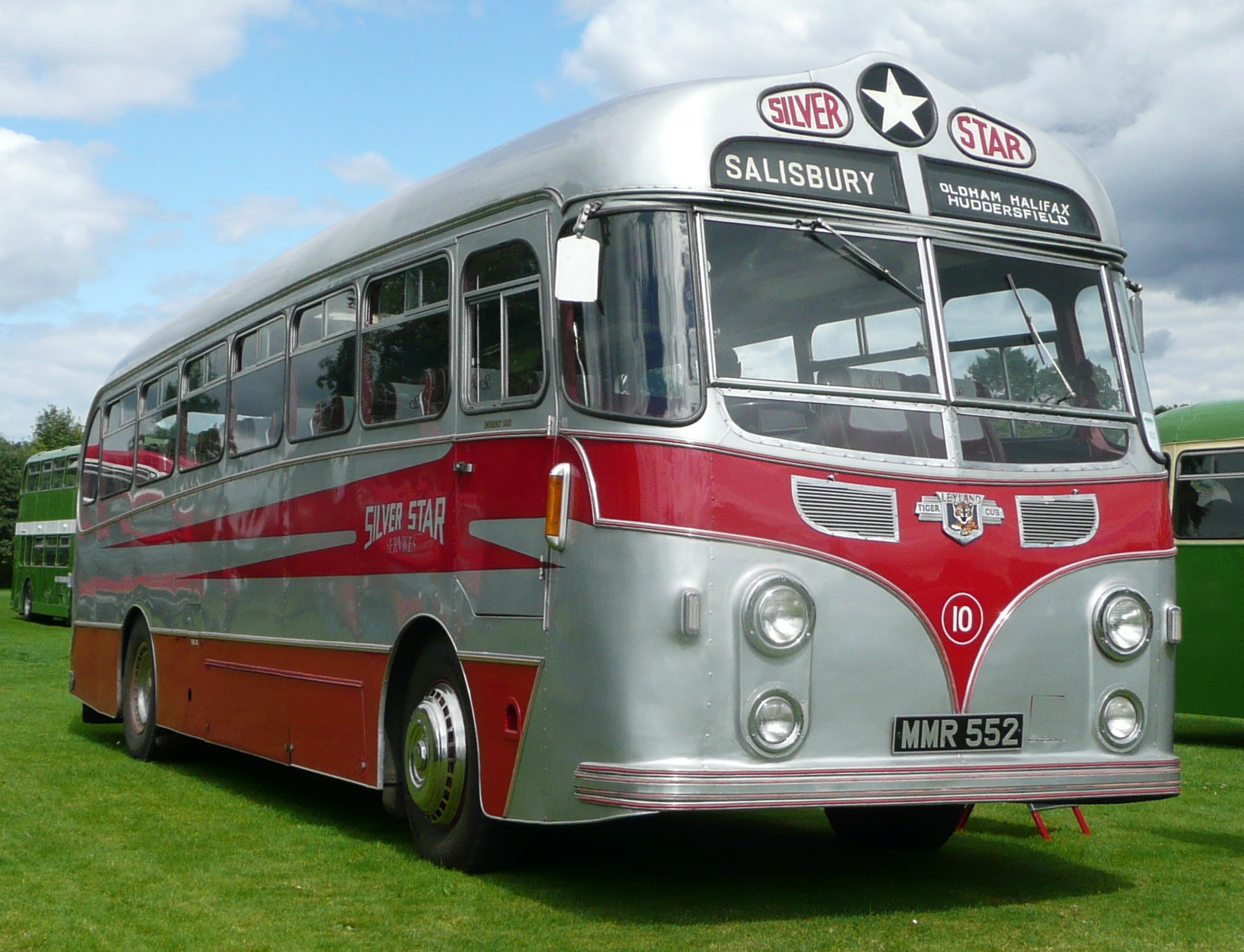
Preserved Harrington Wayfarer-bodied Leyland Tiger Cub of Silver Star, Porton Down.

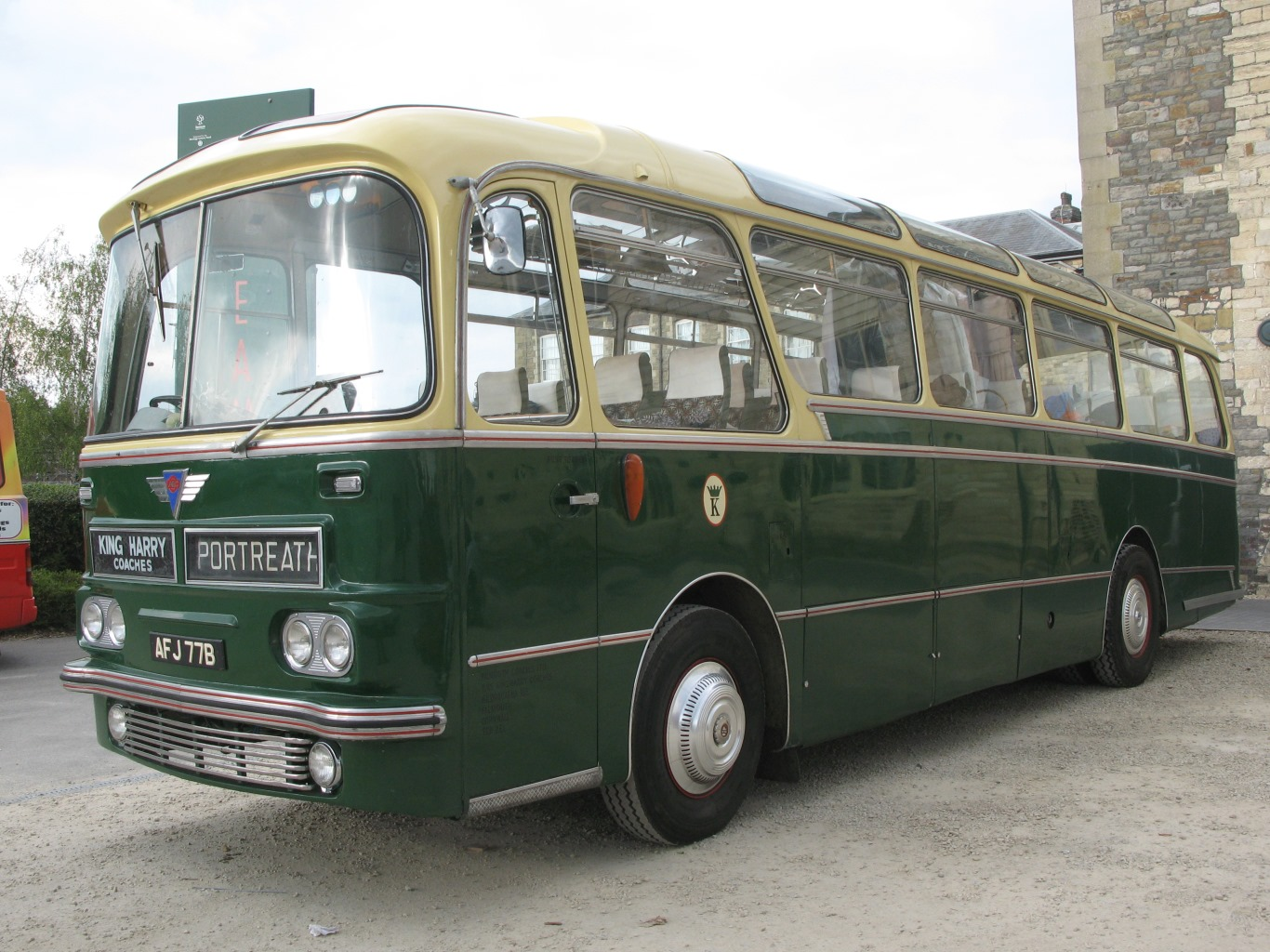
Preserved Harrington Cavalier bodied AEC Reliance

Thomas Harrington & Sons was a coachbuilder in the county of Sussex from 1897 until 1966, initially at Brighton but from 1930 until the end in a purpose built Art Deco factory (an image of which was used on the builder's transfers) in Old Shoreham Road, Hove.

== Overview ==
The company began with the construction of horse-drawn carriages. With the rise of motor vehicle, Thomas Harrington began building on motor car chassis, and prior to World War I began to specialise in commercial vehicles, buses and coaches. After the armistice the company concentrated on luxury coaches supplementing these with some single-deck bus bodies and other general coachbuilding activity.

During World War II, it was selected by the War Ministry to build a specialised aircraft design and during their history they also produced ¼ - scale street-legal model coaches to entertain children, pioneered a minibus that bus operators found practical (and legal) to use and drove-forward coach design. They had an open outlook on developments in technology, a grasp of marketing opportunities and an eye for press advertisement. They nurtured relationships with customers, one at least bought nothing other than Harrington for its entire existence.

In 1965 it was decided to close the factory. Although not a part of the Rootes Group, the operations were owned by a Rootes family investment company. Production ceased in April 1966 after which Plaxton purchased spares, stock in trade and goodwill.

The Cavalier (1959–64) and Grenadier (1962-6) luxury coach bodies for underfloor-engined chassis jointly won the Classic Bus reader poll as the most stylish coach of all time. Many Harrington vehicles are preserved and Harrington devotees have a gathering of their own.

== The 1930s ==
There were huge numbers of small to medium-sized professional coachbuilders in existence around Britain as Thomas Harrington & Sons moved into its new Hove factory. The management of Harringtons decided that two things were necessary to stand them in good stead in this crowded market. The first was building good relationships with blue-chip customers, and the second was to produce designs with a distinctive Harrington 'look'.

Instances of the first were their long-term supply to high–class coach firms in the private and large company sectors. Such private customers included Grey-Green of Stamford Hill, London, Charlies Cars of Bournemouth and Silver Star of Porton Down. The large firms included the Tilling Group's North Western Road Car Company of Stockport and British Electric Traction (BET) group member Devon General of Exeter, but perhaps the most enduring relationship of all was as supplier to the local BET coaching powerhouse Southdown Motor Services.

The styling was a major selling point. A Harrington body had a clear 'look' at a time when coachbuilders, Duple especially, would oblige customers and produce a variety of outlines from the conservative to the totally bizarre, sometimes building to order straight copies of another coachbuilders style.

By the mid-1930s the Harrington 'look' included a half cab with no canopy over the engine and a stepped window line, all arranged in a distinctive flowing series of curves. By the end of the decade when streamlining was the vogue Harrington had devised and patented a new feature called the 'dorsal fin'. This appurtenance looked like a truncated aircraft tail and when applied to the rear of the vehicle allowed a rakishly curved rear-dome outline without compromising passenger access to the rear bench seat and was designed to act as an air-extractor as the vehicle moved, stale air exited the coach saloon due to the suction effect of the low pressure areas created behind the fin.

== World War II ==
But at this time Europe was returning to war, and coach operations ceased, many operators having their vehicles impressed into military service. By the middle of 1940 all non-essential production had been frozen on Government orders and the entire vehicle-building industry had to turn to war work.

Harrington were allocated the Westland Lysander aircraft to build. This was a short take off and landing STOL single-engine type, designed as an artillery spotter, which became noteworthy for its use in covert operations to and from occupied France. As well as the benefits of this to the war effort, it gave Harrington's workforce new skills in jig-building using lightweight alloy sections and extrusions.

== Post-war ==
After the war demand for new buses and coaches was somewhat pent-up as few had been delivered during the war. However, the country had a massive war debt to pay and all manufacturing industries were exhorted to devote at least 50% of output to export. Harrington was able to build a satisfactory export trade, particularly to South American operators and to those in British African colonies. For the home market most bodies were framed in steel-reinforced hardwood.

Because all the established firms were trying to export, and thus were not able to offer even their most loyal customers acceptable lead-times, the period from 1946 to the early 1950s caused a mushrooming of small coachbuilders. There were many new models and styles of coach. In Harrington's case these included (from 1948) the normal control Leyland Comet CPO1 with its small capacity 300 cu in direct-injection diesel and the Commer Avenger full-fronted forward control lightweight coach, with its big Humber petrol engine tilted over to 70 degrees so it hid under the coach floor. Commer was part of the Rootes Group, later the Rootes family bought Harrington and John C Beadle. For customers wanting a return to pre-war glamour, the 'dorsal fin' was available as an option even on the next generation.

== The Wayfarer ==
This was designed for the new underfloor-engined chassis from AEC, Leyland and others but was also to be found on three of the Foden rear engined coach chassis. The Wayfarer ran to four marks and was produced from 1951 to 1961, the longest life of any Harrington design. It was the first to the new dimensions of 30 ft long by 8 ft wide and the first Harrington coach to feature a marque name.

Grey-Green bought every version of the type and also took Harrington-bodied Bedfords throughout the 1950s; Silver Star took marks 1, 3 and 4 on Leyland; Southdown only took the Mark I on Royal Tiger in 1952 and then deserted Harrington until 1960; Charlies Cars took Harrington-bodied Albion Victors and in 1958 had two Wayfarer Mark 4 on Albion Aberdonian chassis. North Western had been transferred from Tilling to BET during World War II and took Wayfarers of Marks 1, 3 and 4 for its touring coaches but went elsewhere for express types, notably toward the end of the decade to Alexander.

== Mini coaches and minibuses ==
From the early 1930s until the mid-1950s Harrington employee and former Southdown driver Ernie Johnstone constructed 63 quarter-scale road-legal coaches to give novelty rides to young children. Many of these were powered by Villiers 125cc two-stroke petrol engines. Bodies on 12 of these working models were constructed by Harrington, the rest he did himself with two friends in his spare time.

During the 1950s Harrington, like Plaxton and Readings offered small party coaches on Karrier and Commer delivery van chassis, whilst from the late 1950s until the factory's closure, Harrington was responsible for producing the Rootes Group's in-house PSV conversion of the Commer 1500 minibus. After Harrington's demise the minibus work went to the former Tilling-Stevens works in Maidstone.

Customers of the minibus included Crosville, the first time the state sector had been served by Harrington since 1949, when United Automobile Services took a batch of Bristol coaches bodied in Hove for their prestigious Newcastle to London service.

The state-owned bus firms' lack of interest in outside suppliers had one over-riding reason: In 1948 ECW and Bristol were served with a statutory ban on selling bodies to other than wholly government-owned organisations and thus ECW took care of almost all of the Tilling Group's bus and coach body needs, produced London Transport's first genuine coaches, and supplied some bodies to the Sheffield Transport C fleet and the Scottish Bus Group.

== The Contender in a contracting market ==
From 1953 to 1969 former Tilling-Stevens factory built the Commer TS3, a compact, if noisy, two-stroke opposed-piston diesel engine adopted in Commer commercials and later marks of its Avenger bus chassis. Harrington (like Beadle) employed units from the Avenger together with a mid-mounted TS3 engine in its Contender range of integral buses and coaches of the mid-1950s, some of these resembled the Wayfarer and others had the standard bus outline of the time, but there was a special design built for British Overseas Airways Corporation (BOAC) this had a straight waistrail and a multi-paned lantern-type windscreen. (One at least of these was powered by an eight-cylinder Rolls-Royce petrol engine of military pattern, driving a torque-converter transmission. An odd choice of propulsion in the fuel-economy obsessed 1950s but they were probably a lot lighter on petrol than a Boeing Stratocruiser or a Lockheed Super Constellation). This style of Contender was sold in 1:76.8 scale model by Dinky Toys as their 'BOAC Coach' BOAC took 28, of which nineteen were used overseas making them the largest customer for the Contender, Maidstone & District Motor Services were second with 11 buses and one coach.

Although during its short life the Contender was less successful than Beadle's integral coaches, Beadle's comparable Chatham range were by 1957 almost their only line and when the BET group decided to reduce the number of its recommended suppliers only Southdown's liking for their coach body on the Leyland Tiger Cub kept the Dartford body lines going, but then Southdown switched to Weymann and briefly Burlingham (having taken Harrington Wayfarer Mark Is in small numbers and then deserted Harrington for most of the 1950s) and that was the end of Beadle in the coachwork game. Rootes decided that the car-dealership chain Beadle also ran was a better business.

During the life of the Wayfarer all of the mushroom coachbuilding businesses disappeared. The clear number one in coach bodies by 1959 was Duple at Hendon, who by 1954 also had a bus factory in the East Midlands at Kegworth and in 1958 purchased the bus builder Willowbrook in nearby Loughborough. Duple was strong in the lightweight end of the market, being first choice for bodies on the market-leading Bedford but was facing competition in the premium underfloor engined class from Plaxton and HV Burlingham of Blackpool. Like Harringtons, these were primarily builders of coach bodies who also did buses, Burlingham built double as well as single deck vehicles and had a respected if small list of customers for these. Weymann, Roe and Alexander were on the other hand bus builders who also did coaches.

== Continental inspiration, more new materials ==
During the run of the Wayfarer and the Contender, Harrington's coachbuilders developed expertise in handling increasingly large and complex glass-reinforced plastic (GRP) mouldings. The management were keeping abreast of European trends in design and had formed an especial friendship with their opposite numbers at the Italian firm of Orlandi. These changes set the seed for future progress. This combination of alloy frame, mainly aluminium panelling and GRP for coachwork features requiring complex compound curvature enabled stronger, lighter and more durable coach bodies. Besides Harrington, Alexander, ECW, Yeates of Loughborough and (in 1954-56) Park Royal were going down this route.

The development of durable laminates for interior panel finish such as wareite and formica was another feature that Harrington started to pioneer. A belated change to the construction and use rules in 1957 allowed fixed, rather than opening, driver's windscreens on public service vehicle (PSV) bodies. This, together with advances in toughened glass manufacture, at last made it possible to have a coach windscreen with a three-dimensional curvature. Early examples of this by Duple, Plaxton and (particularly) Burlingham on the Bedford, Commer and Ford Thames 300E lightweight coaches from 1958 were apt to be 'over the top' echoing similar goldfish-bowl windscreens on large saloon cars by the US-owned carmakers such as the Vauxhall Cresta PA. Harrington did not slavishly adopt, it considered, the next design from Old Shoreham Road retained flat-glazed (optionally-opening) windscreens.

== The Crusader, classic times ahead ==
Until 1957 Harrington designs for lightweight coaches such as the Bedford SB and the Commer Avenger had been unnamed, but in 1958 the Crusader was launched, it used large glass-fibre mouldings for the front and rear panels. It was slightly ungainly in its original form, but the Mark 2 was a fine looking vehicle, updated as Mark 3 with larger, Cavalier-sized side and rear windows. The final Mark 4 was perhaps a retrograde step, but no worse than equivalent Plaxton or Duple offerings of the time. It was built on the above two chassis and the Ford Thames 570E, customers included Northern General Transport Company, Garelochhead Coach Service and Southdown, who took a batch of 15 Commers in 1960. The Crusader was the only classic-era Harrington coach body to be purchased new by the state-owned operators, Transport Holding Company subsidiary Thames Valley Traction taking a small batch of Mark 4 on Bedford SBs for its South Midland coaching operation in 1964. Although that same year Wilts & Dorset took over Silver Star, adding Wayfarers and Cavaliers to its coach fleet. Barton Transport's 20 Grenadier-bodied Reliances are justly famous, but they also took 15 Crusader 3 on Bedford SB5, 1011-25 (BVO11-25C).

== The cars ==
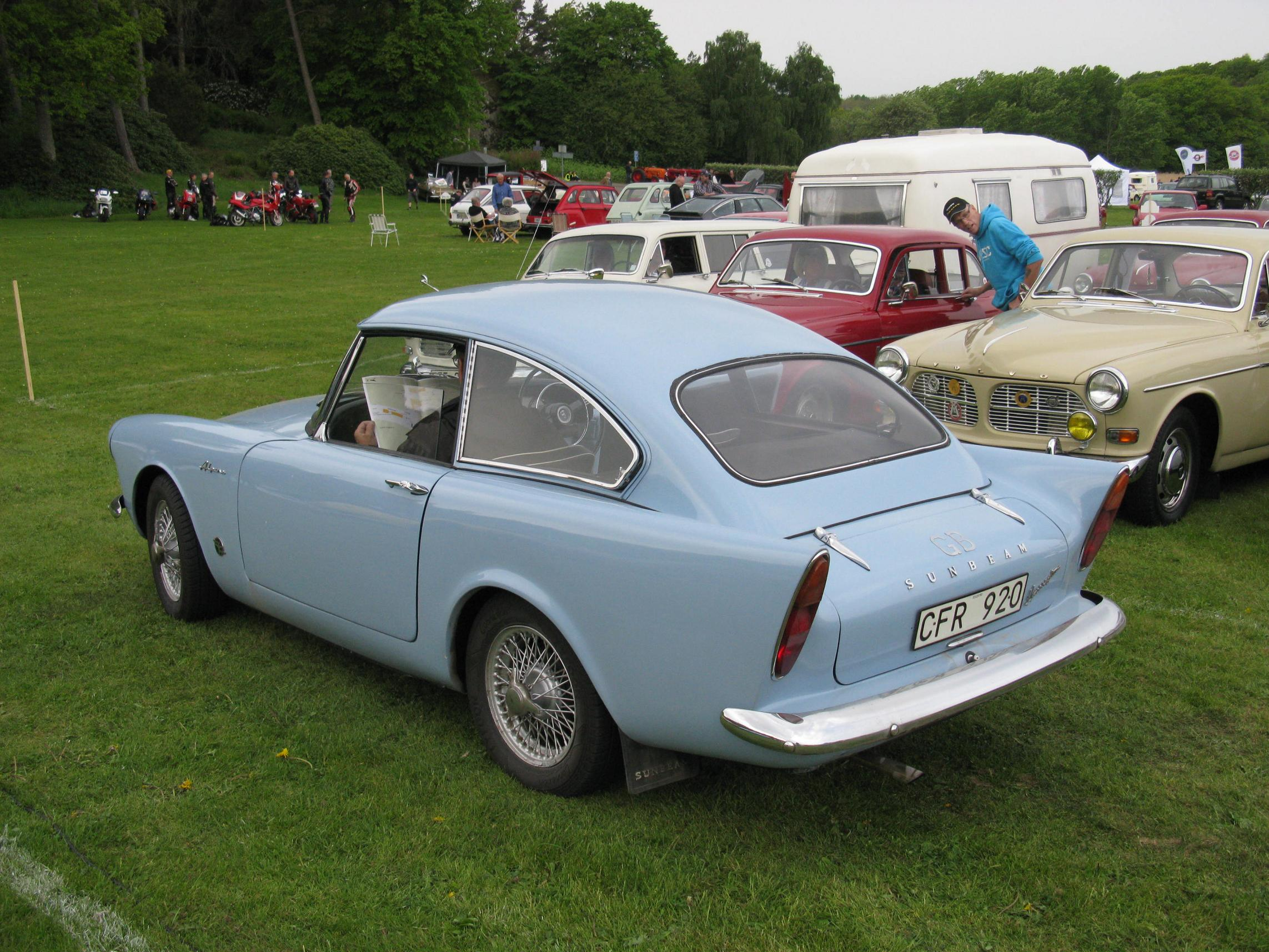
Sunbeam Alpine

When Rootes Group entered the two-seat sports car market in 1959 with the Sunbeam Alpine some customers complained to the dealers that unlike some rival makes such as MG and Jaguar there was not a hardtop coupé version, Thomas Harrington were a Rootes dealer and had more expertise than remaining full Rootes subsidiaries in the use of GRP moulding techniques and thus produced these for sale through selected Rootes dealerships.

The first in this series had a molded fastback roof that resulted in a shortened boot lid, resembling a scaled-down Aston Martin. This was known as the Harrington Alpine, now commonly called the A Series Harrington, with the Sunbeam name notably omitted in the Harrington sales literature. The Harrington A Series was based on the Sunbeam Alpine Series II, although there is at least one Series I bodied A Type, which was likely converted from a car by private customer order. In early 1961 Rootes Competition Department commissioned an A Series Harrington model to be entered in the 1961 Le Mans 24 hr race. The vehicle, 3000RW was prepared in Seacrest Green by the Rootes Works department with aluminum boot, door and bonnet panels and fared-in headlamps. Driven by Peter Harper and Peter Procter, this car beat a works-prepared Porsche to win the Index of Thermal Efficiency, a prestigious award which at the time brought more prize money than second place overall.

There were four iterations of Harringtons built on the Alpine platform from 1961 to 1964. With 110 Series A Harrington Alpines built, most on order but some as retrofit conversions, Harrington switched production in late 1961 to a new model commemorating Harrington's LeMans achievement. This was announced as the Sunbeam Harrington LeMans. The car featured a similar coupe roof line at the previous A Series model but additionally featured an opening rear hatch and bodywork that swept down to the tail, the original Alpine finned rear wings being cut down. Whereas Almost all A series Harrington Alpines were RHD and made for the home market, most of the 250 Harrington LeMans models were LHD destined for export to the United States, where they were marketed by the Rootes dealerships.

The Sunbeam Harrington C Type was the next model introduced, this featured the opening rear hatch in the coupe roof but with retained Alpine finned rear wings This model was introduced at the October 1962 Earls Court Motor Show. Harrington produced this new model in parallel with the LeMans model, and numbers produced were low. It is believed that only 20 were made, with 12 known to survive.

During the production of Harrington models, Sunbeam cosmetically modified the platform. The Series 3 Sunbeam Alpine was released in 1963 and featured a re-engineered body shell with different windscreen which has a steeper rake. This required Harrington to modify the roof in order to accommodate this change. The new model was marketed as the Harrington Alpine D Series. Numbers produced again were low, and in early 1964 the model was again updated with lower rear wing fins.

There is an unconfirmed rumor that a single Harrington Tiger was built as a "nooner", bringing the total Sunbeam-based Harrington count to a maximum of 375. Where the LeMans model had fins bobbed to meet the fiberglass LeMans roof and three horizontal taillights, the later iterations returned to a bolt-on roof, leaving the Alpine fin line and lights undisturbed.

The Le Mans, and C/D Series models had the best access for rear storage, with a top hinged opening hatch similar to the contemporaneous Jaguar E-Type. Three stages of engine tune on the Standerd Sunbeam Alpine were offered by Hartwell's, another Rootes affiliate, leading to a petite Grand Tourer capable of just over 100 mph.

Harringtons also did a similar conversion to the Triumph TR4 for Wimbledon based Dove Garages. This was called the Dové GTR4. The success of the Alpine programme including an encouraging performance at Le Mans led Commer to entrust Harrington with the PSV conversion of the 1500 van, which included a complete one piece fibreglass roof panel of clerestory outline.

== The Cavalier: compared to its competitors ==
Launched at the end of 1959, the Cavalier was ahead of the opposition in many if not all respects. Certainly its outside appearance was a classic combination of curves, sharp angles, and peaks in harmony, which combined with understated use of bright trim in a way that made it stand out from the opposition by combining style with good taste, the double curvature windscreen was not only wholly in line with the style of the body but it helped night-time coach drivers by dispelling interior reflections.

The Plaxton Panorama (launched in production guise in 1959) had a basically rather boxlike shape and a very flashy grille, but it did pioneer Smiths Instruments 'jet-vent' forced ventilation system allowing fixed windows and a cleaner side outline.

The Duple Britannia (1956, on its third facelift for the 1960 season) had an excessively droopy outline and tiny windows, and was very little different from Duple's gaudy Super Vega/Yeoman/Corinthian for cheap coach chassis. Duple probably didn't care, the Britannia was not where the jam lay.

The Duple (Midland) Donington was really just a bus tricked out with more chrome.

The Willowbrook Viscount (new for 1960) had puzzling trim lines stopping and starting in the middle of nowhere and an overly-bulky outline whilst the optional reverse-rake rear glass was a feature that was already dated at the time of its launch and today simply looks odd.

Alexander sold coaches south of the border to North Western and Barton Transport and had a pair of fairly conservative (though aluminium-alloy framed) designs. The curved-waist style which Barton had taken since 1954 was discontinued in 1959 after its other major customer Western SMT had stopped ordering it, North Western took the straight-waisted variant for most of its coach applications, even taking its first batch of 36 ft (see later) Leopards to this outline.

Weymann built its Fanfare design for sale through MCW from 1954 to 1962 without alteration, at the end of its run it was a dated looking body.

Roe had during the 1950s a coach renaissance, selling versions of its Dalesman style to independents and company fleets almost exclusively on the AEC Reliance, in 1959 the Dalesman IV had trapezoidal glazing and a straight waistrail; the biggest customer for this style being Black & White Motorways of Cheltenham.

The masterly execution of the Cavalier stood out most against Burlingham's Seagull 70, its closest contemporary and a body very similar in construction and basic outline. Comparing the two the Seagull 70s detailing was crude and over-emphasised whereas that of the Cavallier was sharply delineated, making the whole coach look lean and sculpted by comparison with the Burlingham style. Some would say that they summed up the difference between Blackpool and Hove. During that season Duple purchased Burlingham and renamed it Duple (Northern).

The Yeates Europa (from 1958, on first facelift for 1960) combined a similarly dumpy volume to the Willowbrook, made in the same town, with deliberately tasteless detailing and riotous paint schemes in a way that operators and passengers either loved or loathed, but it was easily the brashest option.

=== 1960 sales ===
The Cavalier was initially offered at 30 ft long by 8 ft wide to fit any suitable underfloor engined chassis. As was normal with Harrington the previous Wayfarer Mark 4 coach remained available (if requested) for the next couple of years, but it was clear the advantage was with the Cavalier. By the time Lloyds of Nuneaton's 3857UE was shown at the 1960 Commercial Motor Show at Earls Court 68 Cavaliers had been sold to seven BET fleets, ten independents and local charity St Dunstan's Home for the Blind. These were mainly on AEC Reliance, but Charlies Cars of Bournemouth took six Albion Aberdonian, East Yorkshire Motor Services took five on Leyland Tiger Cub and Ellen Smith of Rochdale took the sole Leyland Leopard. The Cavalier was a clear success already, with a number of influential customers well out of Harrington's heartland. Sales were both more geographically widespread and in many cases to customers who had not taken Harrington bodies before. The output from Hendon on equivalent chassis that season was 81.

=== 1961 sales ===
Between January and November 1961, 114 Cavaliers were sold, there were repeat orders for the Cavalier from eight operators including St Dunstan's. Of the six BET operators three were new customers for the style, both of the largest taking Leopards for their most prestigious touring duties. Southdown's first order was for forty bodies and Ribble Motor Services, who had favoured local builder HV Burlingham for the past decade took 35. The largest repeat order was from Northern General who again took ten touring coaches, this time on Leopard, and independents adding further Cavaliers were Abbott of Blackpool, Ellen Smith of Rochdale, Flight of Birmingham and Harris of Greys. The most important new independent customer was Yelloway (a conquest from the Duple group) taking six Reliances.

In terms of chassis on which to build Harringtons fortune had definitely swung in the direction of Farington, with 86 Leopards and a Tiger Cub being bodied in contrast with only 26 Reliances, the Albion Aberdonian had been discontinued the previous year, so it would from now on be a straight fight between Lancashire and Middlesex.

Duple's 1961 season total for the Brittania on its final facelift was 77, all but five on Reliance. The Donington had got bigger windows and Brittania-like trim but between them the expanded Duple group were building not only the Brittania and the Donington but also the Viscount and the Seagull 70, the differences were not just skin-deep either, all the Duple bodies had steel-reinforced hardwood frames, also Plaxton's structural method, The Loughborough-built Donington and Viscount both used frame-sections made from rolled steel tubes, whilst Burlingham's bodies (like those of Harrington and Yeates) were of jig-built aluminium.

Plaxton had refined the Panorama with subtler detailing and inward sloping pillars above the waistrail for the 1961 season. Like Harrington they also offered a more conservative option, in their case an Embassy body with twice as many side windows.

A more conservative option definitely wasn't Yeates' style, instead they introduced a more radical one, if the Europa was insufficiently in-your-face they could offer you the Fiesta, now with trapezoid glazing. Yeates was always going to be a minority choice, and as Yeates sold everyone else's coachwork (their core business being dealership) perhaps they wanted it that way. 1961 proved though that on the premium chassis, Harrington was now second only to Plaxton, although Duple vastly outstripped either (and the Burlingham operation they now owned) in the market for lightweight day-trip coaches.

During 1961 the legal maximum width and length limits for buses and coaches was relaxed, new maxima were 36 ft by 8 ft 2½in, to take effect from 1 January 1962. Leyland and AEC had suitable models on the stocks by the end of the year whilst continuing production of the shorter-wheelbase models. These could legally carry a slightly longer body than 30 ft and the first 1962-season Cavalier delivered in December 1961 (a repeat order for Keith Coaches of Aylesbury on Reliance) was the first Cavalier 315, so called because it was 1 ft 5in longer than the previous model which enabled Harrington to fit 43 of its own seats into the coach, rather than the previous maximum of 41. Duple and Plaxton had offered a 43-seat plan within the older length limits, but their seats were a bit skimpier on padding and even so came close to infringing legal minimum length requirements.

During 1962 the original Cavalier was still offered as was the Cavalier 36, to the new maximum length. The 315 carried most of its extra length in a longer first side window, whilst the 36 ft version had this plus an extra shallower window just aft of the first bay which unlike the rest of the side glazing had a horizontal lower edge, the waistrail now resuming its dip at the third bay, this saved on the cost of extra tooling and made the Cavalier a truly modular range of coach bodies although it certainly did not look that way, the longer first bay window, to the same depth as the windscreen and with a forward sloping pillar made the front of the 315 coach look better balanced. Although the longer version was not as happy as the extended Panorama, tending to look slightly 'droopy' it neither looked as fussy as Blackpool's Continental, or Addlestone's Castilian nor was it quite as distracting as the Europa or Fiesta at the new length.

Harrington's cleverness in construction was necessary for as well as three variants of the Cavalier Old Shoreham Road had to find space for car and minibus conversion work, production of Mark 2 Crusader and bus bodies on AEC Reliance and Albion Nimbus chassis. There was news that Maidstone and District had been weaned off the Wayfarer Mark 4 and that model could be buried after the innings. Still the end of the Wayfarer Mark 4 meant that the customers would be wanting something more up to date than even the Cavalier Also plans came from Luton for a Bedford chassis for the new maximum length market sector; this was going to be radical in concept and not suitable to the Cavalier outline, nor that of any Cavalier Mark 2, still less would it suit an extended Crusader, so not only was the factory floor busy so were the designers in the drawing office.

=== 1962 sales ===
In its final year the 30 foot Cavalier sold 17, all on Reliance. Maidstone & District took ten, South Wales two and Trent Motor Traction, another BET subsidiary, took five, one of which was a replacement body on an accident-salvaged chassis built in 1958.

13 of the 31 ft 5in version were sold, all to existing customers. In the BET group Southdown took 3 more Leopards, Greenslades had three Reliances and Thomas Brothers of Port Talbot added a further Reliance; of the independents Gliderways took another Tiger Cub, Keith of Aylesbury, Harris of Greys and Summerbees of Southampton took more Reliances. A further Reliance was sold to Stanley Hughes, the Bradford dealer, who leased it for the 1962 season to Wallace Arnold of Leeds.

As well as these 30 short Cavaliers a further 26 of the 36 foot model were sold. Harrington also sold-off RNJ900, the original Cavalier demonstrator, replacing it with a 36-foot Reliance 470 registered VPM898, which in turn was sold in 1964 to Hall Bros of South Shields.

There were two different sorts of long AEC Reliance, the 470 (type 4MU) used the 7.68-litre engine of the shorter version, at a peak rating of 130 bhp, whilst the 590 (type 2U) used a 9.6-litre 140 bhp engine as in the export AEC Regal VI chassis.

Southdown chose two 49 seater Leopards to the new length, whilst Greenslades added to its collection of Cavaliers with three Reliance 590s and a new BET customer was Neath and Cardiff Coaches with two long Reliance 470s, seating the maximum 51.

The independent buyers of the Cavalier 36 in its first season placing repeat orders for the style were Abbot, Ellen Smith, Yelloway and Hawkey of Newquay and new Cavalier customers included Grey-Green, Hudson of Horncastle, Ayres of Dover, Liss & District in Hampshire and Straws of Leicester, formerly a Plaxton loyalist. Grey-Green had its first 36-foot Cavalier on express service a month after the length was legal. The benefits of longer coaches were clearer for express services than for tours, especially tours to more remote scenic areas. Yelloway's 36 footers had an option peculiar to the operator of additional destination displays over the second and fourth nearside windows. For express work there was also an optional destination box in the roof dome, as well as Yelloway Motor Services, Grey Green were among the operators who specified this.

Fifty-seven Cavaliers sold new was exactly half the 1961 performance but the coach market was in a downturn, in comparison Duple sold only nineteen Britannias on short Reliances and four on short Leopard, two of the AECs and one Leopard had old-fashioned central entrances. Blackpool built no further Seagull 70s but built 27 of its 36 ft Duple (Northern) Continental on Reliances, 12 on Leopard (including six for Ribble) and one Leyland Royal Tiger Worldmaster (a cancelled export order) for Happiways of Manchester.

=== 1963 sales ===
In the 1963 season the Cavalier faced internal competition from the Grenadier (see below) but 21 of the 31 ft 5in version and 49 of the 36 ft were sold. Existing customers who placed repeat orders for the short Cavalier were Southdown (4 Leopard L2), Greenslades (another Reliance), Grey Green's orders included a short Reliance and ten Leopard L2 and Harris of Greys, Summerbee of Southampton and McIntyre of Aberdeen all took further Reliances, Harris' being a rebody of a 1958 chassis damaged in an accident. New customers for the 31 ft 5in Cavalier were Munden of Bristol (Leopard L2) and Crump of Pinner (Reliance). A new option was fixed side glazing and forced ventilation. Southdown having this on its Leopards.

All but one of the BET customers for the long Cavalier had taken the style before, Neath and Cardiff had two Reliance 470 and East Yorkshire four Leopard PSU3, Ribble had 22 on Leopard PSU3 with the new forced ventilation option, the other three were for a newly acquired Ribble subsidiary, Scout Motor Services of Preston, to the same specification as the Ribble examples. Grey Green had one Leopard PSU3 and one Reliance 470, the latter with forced ventilation. The other repeat orders from independents were from Yelloway who took 5 Reliance 590 with the jet-vent system, as well as the additional side destination screens and Ellen Smith, also of Rochdale, with a Leopard fitted with 45 reclining seats, Yelloway standardising on this luxurious option on its Reliances, the short ones seating only 37 as a result. New purchasers of the Cavalier 36 in its second season were Anglo-Continental of Tunbridge Wells (5 Reliance 590) Valliant of Ealing (4 Reliance 590) and Regent of Redditch with a single Reliance 590.

In 1963 Duple had three new styles for underfloor-engined chassis, the Alpine Continental was a longer-windowed version of the Continental whilst the Dragonfly was a 36 ft central entrance coach, both were built at Blackpool, the latter having a steel reinforced hardwood body frame. For the shorter AECs and Leylands the Britannia was finally replaced by the Hendon-built Commodore, which was a modification of the mass market Bella Vista body being 1 ft 10in longer with a front entrance and a maximum capacity of 45. Total Continental/Alpine Continental sales were 17, while only six Dragonflies were built, two Leyland demonstrators on Leopard and four for BET coach operator Samuelson of Victoria. The Commodore was also a sales disappointment, eight Reliance and three Leopard L2 being sold. Willowbrook however were gaining express-coach orders for its version of the BET-standard single decker. In coach form four main bays were fitted as was fixed glazing and forced ventilation and there was an optional solid coach door and brightwork grille. Marshall and Weymann also built BET style express coaches.

In contrast Plaxton had a further revised Panorama, with barely perceptible waist curvature and only three main side window bays on the 36 ft body, the dome was refined and thinner trim strips were used producing a body of unusual restraint for a Plaxton, it was an instant sales success. Ribble, for one, placing large orders.

Another competitive body was Alexander Y Type, first shown in 1961, which in coach form had four trapezoid windows on each straight-waisted side and double curvature glazing front and rear. As well as selling massively to the Scottish Bus Group, BET fleets who took the style from 1962/63 were North Western and East Midland, followed in later seasons by Trent, Potteries, the Northern General Group, Hebble, Yorkshire Traction, Yorkshire Woollen and Stratford Blue, whilst three independents purchased the style over its lifetime, Scottish co-operative Wholesale Society had four Reliances, Venture of Consett took 12 Reliances and 26 Leopards, with eight more on order when Northern took them over, whilst Premier Travel of Cambridge had sixteen on Reliance. BET favoured steel-tube body framing and, as introduced, the Y type featured this Alexanders reverting to aluminum framework from 1972/73.

=== 1964/65 sales and totals ===
The 1964 season short Cavaliers for BET fleets Greenslades (10 Reliance) and Devon General Grey Cars (8 Reliance) were notable in being to 7 ft 6in width and having Grenadier style dash panels. Grey-Green took eleven, Leopard L2, Crump of Pinner took another Reliance and Hutchings & Cornelius with one Reliance became the last new customer for the Cavalier. 31 of the short version were built in its final season.

There were eleven of the longer version, six were for Yelloway on Reliance 590, Grey Green took four Leopard PSU3, Valliant of Ealing had two Reliance 590 and Ellen Smith took a 49-seat Leopard PSU3. The only BET customer was Thomas Brothers of Port Talbot with a 49-seat Reliance 470.

In 1965 Yelloway took the last six 36-foot Cavaliers on Reliance 590. In all 359 Cavaliers had been built, one 30 ft demonstrator, one 36 ft and 357 coaches sold of which 199 were 30 ft, 65 31 ft 5in and 93 36 ft.

There were 99 30 ft Cavaliers sold (plus a demonstrator) on AEC Reliance 2MU chassis, 87 on Leyland Leopard L2T, seven on Leyland Tiger Cub PSUC1/2T and six on Albion Aberdonian MR11L.

Cavalier 315 sales totalled 37 Reliances and 28 Leopards.

Cavalier 36 sales comprised 39 Leopard PSU3, 52 Reliance 590 (2U) and 13 Reliance 470 (4MU) plus the demonstrator, which was sold after a year to Hall Bros. of South Shields who became a loyal Grenadier customer.

== The Grenadier, an apotheosis ==
To supplement the Cavalier for the 1963 season the Grenadier was introduced, initially available on the longer chassis it was outwardly similar but a tauter-looking body, the structure was similar but the glazing was revised employing one fewer window per side and dipping less toward the rear. A larger windscreen was fitted with a more prominent peak, only the rear glass was carried over from the Cavalier. Revised front and rear GRP mouldings were employed, that at the front accenting the horizontal and carrying a larger destination box, that at the rear having horizontal rather than vertical light clusters. The forced-ventilation set up was standard, intakes for it being fitted in the front peak rather than in Plaxton-style air-scoops on the roof, these changes adding further to the cleanliness of line, the bright trim was of a similar layout to that of the Cavalier, the skirt mouldings being carried over virtually unchanged. Although roof quarter glazing was a common option on Cavaliers the less rounded roof-line of the Grenadier ensured Grenadiers with this option were rare.

=== 1963 sales ===
The first two Grenadiers were a Reliance 590 for Harris of Greys and a Leopard PSU3 for Grey-Green, both of which were shown at the 1962 Earls Court Commercial Motor show. In the initial season a further 36 ft Reliance 590 went to Abbott of Blackpool, two Leopards to Gliderways of Smethwick, five to Northern General (the only BET order) and a unique 33 ft Grenadier went to Hawkey of Newquay on a Reliance 590 with specially reduced front and rear overhangs, it was registered 900SAF and sat 47.

=== 1964 sales ===
For the 1964 season a 31 ft 10in option for the shorter chassis was introduced. 39 of these went to six BET companies and seven independents, previous Harrington customers were North Western, Southdown, Trent and Timpson of Catford.

Southdown specified the dash panels of the Cavalier on their batch. The return of North Western was maybe a surprise as they were a major supporter of the 11m Alexander Y Type, but they obviously wanted something shorter (and a bit classier) for their extended tours, their two Leopard L2 had illuminated offside and nearside name badges under the second bay.

The two new BET customers were Western Welsh and Black & White Motorways of Cheltenham, both taking short Reliances. Straw of Leicester had previously taken the Cavalier and specified a Cavalier dash on its Reliance, conquest sales for the short Grenadier in the independent sector were to Jones of Aberbeeg, Birch Brothers and Motorways Overseas, both of London, Roman City of Bath and Wye Valley Motors of Hereford; the first three operators took Reliances and the latter two Tiger Cubs, Roman City's was a rebodied 1954 ex-Ribble coach whilst Wye Valley's two new examples had 45 coach seats, not possible using Harrington seats, so Plaxton seats were purchased and fitted.

For the long Grenadier there was only one BET purchaser, Maidstone & District taking five Reliance 590. BOAC took two of the same for its Glasgow-Prestwick Airport service.

The independent buyers were Abbott of Blackpool, Barton Transport, Bermuda of Nuneaton, Gliderways, Hall Brothers of South Shields, Jones, Keith of Aylesbury and Motorways Overseas. Of the 32 built 5 were on Leopards. All 27 Reliances were of the 590 type, Bartons 979-988 (979-88 VRR) having Cavalier type windscreens and a roof mounted destination box as well as air operation for the coach door, enabling use as a bus. Hall Bros had an illuminated name badges on the nearside under the first bay on its three Leopards and sole Reliance 590. This was the final year of the dateless registration plate system and two classics were on Grenadier-bodied Reliances, Keith Coaches had 1234PP whilst the first of Maidstone & District’s carried 3294D. A change to legal regulations to come into effect from 1965 required additional emergency exits on bodies seating more than 45, on the Grenadier 36 the offside first bay, just aft of the drivers window, was to be fitted with a top-hinged exit door for its final two seasons.

=== 1965 ===
Southdown headed the BET list for short Grenadiers taking another ten to its style on Leopard L2, North Western had a further three L2 and Samuleson of Victoria (their garage is now the Arrivals terminal for Victoria Coach Station) took four L2, the other BET purchasers chose the Reliance, Timpson of Catford taking four and their subsidiary Bourne & Balmer of Croydon taking two.

Private sector customers were, on Leopard, Grey Green (4) and Jones, Aberbeeg (1), Ekcersley of St Helens took a Grenadier body on a reconditioned 1954 Tiger Cub chassis whilst Gliderways had two new Tiger Cubs, the rest were on Reliance, Bowen of Birmingham had three, and one each went to the following: Green Luxury, Walton-on-Thames, Harris of Greys, Hutchings & Cornelius, South Petherton, Rickard of Brentford and Warburton of Bury

The sole BET customer for the 36-foot Grenadier was Black & White Motorways of Cheltenham, taking five Leopard PSU3. Private-sector Leopard buyers were Hall Bros, South Shields (4), Laceys of West Ham (1, the 1964 show coach) and Ellen Smith (1). The Reliance list was headed by Barton Transport whose 1001-10 featured a destination box below the windscreen in lieu of the illuminated name badge, allowing the fitment of a standard Grenadier windscreen but they retained the power doors, they were registered BVO1-10C and featured Reliance 4U3RA air-suspended chassis, a very rare option on the home market; the only other air-sprung chassis to receive Harrington bodies were the initial Ribble and Southdown batches of Cavalier bodied Leopard L2T. Steel-sprung Reliance 590s went to Valliant of Ealing (four with top-sliding windows in lieu of forced vents), Motorways Overseas, London, Surrey Motors of Sutton (3 each), Regent of Redditch (2), Beavis of Bussage, Gloucestershire (one), Bermuda of Nuneaton (one) and Hawkey of Newquay (one). The 1965 sales list also included a 51-seat Reliance 470 for Hutchings and Cornelius.

=== 1966, The Swansong ===
Closure had been announced at the time of delivery of the 1966 examples, there was one batch at 31 ft 10in comprising four Reliances for Greenslades. The 36-footers comprised 15 Reliance 590 for Maidstone & District, 8 with top sliders for Devon General's Grey Cars operation and a final six Leopard PSU3 for Grey-Green.

Greenslades FFJ13D was shown in a valedictory appearance for Harringtons at the 1966 Brighton Coach Rally. It bore plaques proclaiming it the final Harrington body built.

=== Grenadier totals ===
192 Grenadiers were built, one to 33 ft length, 82 to 31 ft 10in and 109 to 36 ft. Two of the shortest versions were on rebodied Leyland Tiger Cub, and four on new Leyland Tiger Cub PSUC1/12T chassis, 34 on Leyland Leopard L2T, the remaining 42 on short-wheelbase AEC Reliance 470 2MU3RA.

Of the 109 to 36-foot length, eleven were built in 1963, seventy-one in 1964, seventy-seven in 1965 and 33 in 1966. Of those, one was a Reliance 470 4MU3RA, 68 were Reliance 590 2U3RA and ten were air-sprung Reliance 4U3RA, the total on Leyland Leopard PSU3 was 30. The sole 33 ft version was on a modified Reliance 2U3RA.

== The Legionnaire ==
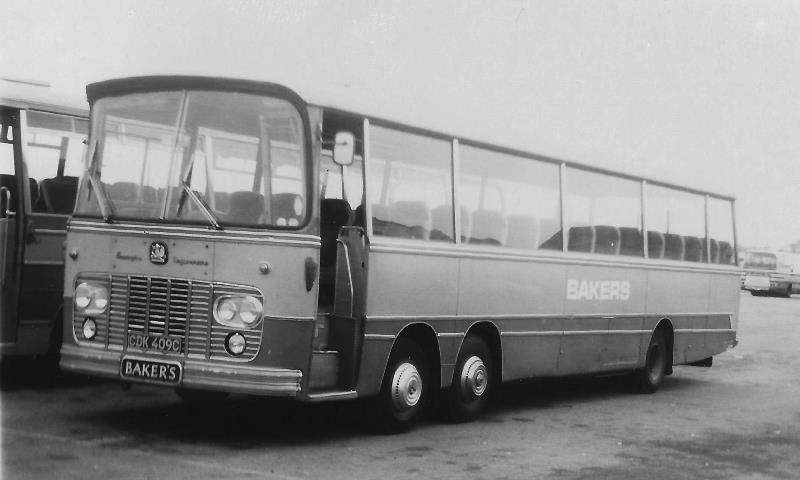
Bakers Dolphin Harrington Legionnaire bodied Bedford VAL

During 1961 Vauxhall Motors told British coachbuilders about its new design to be produced from the end of 1962. The Bedford VAL was a twin-steering chassis with a long front overhang designed for an entrance ahead of the steering axles, a unique feature of the type was that the wheels were only 16-inch in diameter, which in turn reduced the floor height of bodied examples, the radiator was mounted at the front and immediately behind it was the 125 bhp Leyland O.400 engine. The Harrington Legionnaire was a square-rigged body with straight waistrail and five deep windows per side, one less than the Duple Vega Major and one more than the Plaxton Val. It also differed from the Cavalier and Grenadier by having plated window surrounds, there was a large brightwork grille and twin headlights, a Grenadier style front windscreen was used with a similar sized one at the rear. Above the windscreen was a destination box or illuminated nameboard and above that a prominent peak.

At the rear the illuminated nameboard was inside the rear glass and this was fitted the other way about to the front, meaning the first and last pillars had a pronounced forward rake to them whilst all the others were vertical. The Cantrail was flat above it was a roof section of very shallow curvature. The mark two which followed in 1964 for the final two seasons omitted this flat cantrail and had a roof of compound curvature, which reduced the tall square effect of the original but reduced space in the overhead luggage racks. The Legionnaire was built on the Bedford VAL, the more conventional Ford Thames 36 and there were also two specials on Guy Victory trambus chassis.

The Legionnaire took its fame from the 1969 film The Italian Job. The ending of the film involves a Mark II Legionnaire (ALR 453B) hanging over a cliff in the Alps, as the driver had taken the coach into a skid and lost control. A remake model can be seen at the De La Warr Pavilion art gallery.

== The Harrington Society ==
Many Harrington vehicles, buses, coaches cars and miniature coaches survive, ranging from a late 1920s Leyland to Cavaliers, Grenadiers and five Legionnaires, one of which is a replica of the Italian Job coach. Every five years the Harrington Society hold a gathering at the Amberley Museum to celebrate the coachbuilder and its products. The last gathering was in 2012 and was attended by Roy Harrington, Clive Harrington, Anne Hanrahan ( née Harrington ), Michael Harrington and Christine Harrington. Many cherished examples of the marque, both cars and coaches, were on display.
