= Albion Aberdonian =

Overview
- Manufacturer: Albion
- Production: 1957–60

Body and chassis
- Doors: 1–2
- Floor type: Step entrance

Powertrain
- Engine: Leyland O350H diesel engine Leyland O375H diesel engine
- Power output: 97–107bhp
- Transmission: Albion 5 or 6 speed constant-mesh

Dimensions
- Length: 30 ft (9.1 m)

The Albion Aberdonian was an underfloor-engined bus designed and manufactured by Albion Motors between 1957 and 1960, it was introduced as a longer derivative of the Albion Nimbus.

The Aberdonian, development code "Nimbus-Six", was designed to be the lightest full-size underfloor-engined bus available. Bodied examples would weigh half a ton less than the similarly powered Leyland Tiger Cub. Launch was at the 1957 Scottish Motor Show at the Kelvin Hall where an Alexander bodied coach demonstrator in Edinburgh Corporation livery weighing less than five tons unladen was shown. It was the fourth Albion bus designed with an underfloor engine, the third type manufactured, the second after the Leyland takeover and the second named Albion bus chassis not to have a name beginning with V.

An Aberdonian is a native of Aberdeen and within Scotland Aberdonians are traditionally considered miserly. As the current editor of Buses put it this was a bus designed to sip rather than gulp fuel.

== Chassis features ==
The frame comprised lightweight longitudinal channel and tubular cross-members. It was straight over the axles with a dropped section forward of the front axle to provide a lower entrance. A drop frame for a luggage boot was optional at the rear. Special steels were used to keep weight down.

The power unit on launch was a Leyland O350H 97 bhp 5.76-litre four-stroke direct-injection six-cylinder diesel, mounted horizontally in mid-wheelbase driving through a unit-mounted Albion clutch and constant mesh gearbox to an overhead-worm rear axle derived from that fitted to the FT and PF series lorries. The radiator was mounted behind the front axle and was inclined to allow a larger surface area without intrusion into the saloon. Braking was vacuum-assisted hydraulic with an engine-driven vacuum exhauster. The fuel tank was a 35 gallon cylindrical unit transversely mounted between the frame members aft of the rear axle. The engine was fitted with an oil-bath air cleaner and a centrifugal oil filter.

In the manufacturer's brochure the Aberdonian was quoted as only a 42 seater bus and 39 seater coach when practical UK maxima for 30 ft (9.1 m) & 8 ft (2.4 m) bodies were 45 and 43 respectively. This must have been because of the chassis 8.5 ton GVW although the chassis had a meagre dry weight of 2,934 kg (6,468 lb) and with lightweight bodies 45 bus seats or 41 coach seats were fitted to most UK examples and the Ceylon examples sat as many as 54, probably through use of 3+2 seating.

The choice of vehicles on the front cover of the brochure was itself of interest. The Western SMT coach (KCS713) pictured uppermost is shown with London on the blind, but it was unlikely ever to have gone that far south. In another picture of this vehicle taken on the same occasion Robert Greives said that it was allocated to Newton Mearns to work expresses to Lancashire until transferred to Alexander (Northern) in 1963. At the time when the picture was posed by Walter Alexander Coachbuilders near Stirling Castle, Western's Glasgow to London run was the province of toilet-equipped Guy Arab UFs and LUFs and by the release date of the brochure they had ordered their first Leyland Leopards for this route.

The lower picture is of a Weymann-bodied bus for North Western Road Car Company, the picture being taken near the coachbuilder's factory in Addlestone, Surrey.

The Leyland-group nomenclature of the period can be confusing, as several systems were operating at once in different product lines and different markets. For the type code MR11L, the mnemonic MR indicated a Claymore-type frame, 11 meant it was the heaviest Claymore-type vehicle and the L meant long wheelbase although only a 16 ft 4 in (4.98 m) wheelbase was available. Although note intriguingly that some completely knocked down (ckd) chassis for Indonesia were given as MR11N and some Australian chassis were given the Sp suffix, which suggests non-standard equipment sanctioned at Scotstoun, Leyland or Chorley.

== Sales ==
=== United Kingdom ===
Western had three of the Scottish Bus Group's twenty-six, all Alexander bodied coaches, one went to SOL, the rest were new to Alexanders, all of these were coach-bodied. North Western Road Car Company had six of the British Electric Traction group's 46, all of which were buses; the others going to PMT (34), Northern General Transport Company (5) and East Yorkshire Motor Services (1).The East Yorkshire bus had a Park Royal body, the other BET fleets had Weymann although PMT also took Willowbrook bodies.

The major purchaser in the UK was the Ulster Transport Authority with 57 (following on from narrow Tiger Cubs), all bodied as 41-seat buses by the operator on Alexander frames.

Independent Venture of Consett, County Durham had 17, a mixture of 45-seat bus and 41-seat dual-purpose with Willowbrook coachwork, one of which had been an unregistered demonstrator. Charlie's Cars of Bournemouth were the largest private sector operators of the coach with 2 Harrington Wayfarers and 6 Cavaliers. Smith of Wigan (6) and Gardiner, Spennymoor (4) had Plaxton batches. Yeates bodied one C41F Europa coach VMW441 for an independent, Berridge & Sons of Warminster in Wiltshire. there were three other Harrington Wayfarers (all the Harrington coaches were C41F) and six other Plaxton coaches, XWR195 of Hollings, Askern being the only centre-entrance coach built, like all but one of the Plaxton coaches it also sat 41, the exception being UGD877 to C37F plan for Cotter of Glasgow, a high class touring outfit who at the time provided Celtic Football Club with their team coach. There were seven Plaxton Highway buses seating 41-45, two for Armstrong of Ebchester, three to Welsh operators LCW, Llandeilo, Thomas Bros, Llangadog and Williams, Blayna; the other two went to Pepper of Thurnscoe and Hudson of Horncastle.

In the municipal sector Manchester Corporation had six buses with Seddon bodies, Southend-on-Sea four Weymann buses whilst Edinburgh bought an Alexander-bodied bus to go with the show coach which was registered in Glasgow as an Albion demonstrator.

Other than that Willowbrook registered DP41F demonstrator RNR558 and Burlingham built a B45F bus on chassis 82506E, which worked for the Northern Ireland Hospitals Board, registered WZ886.

There were three Aberdonians not bodied as buses. WGA904 was a mobile electrical-products showroom built on chassis 82025E in 1958/9 by John Limond Coachbuilders of Ayr. It featured Duple 'butterfly-front' coach components to the specification of the South of Scotland Electricity Board. It was said to return 20.6 miles per gallon. One other Aberdonian chassis 82525K registered XYF2 was new transporting Lola Cars then went to the John Cooper motor racing team in London as a coachbuilt (coachbuilder unknown) car transporter and a third chassis 82521A was bodied as a furniture van (registration as well as coachbuilder not currently known) to Lancashire furniture maker Eastham, Thornton.

=== Exports ===
The Albion Aberdonian was also sold overseas to Australia, Ceylon, Indonesia and Mauritius. Many were exported as ckd kits. The Ceylon Transport Board purchased 102.

Under the Colombo Plan, the Government of Australia funded 100 for Indonesia that were bodied by Freighter Lawton Industries. Eight were purchased by United Bus Service, Mauritius.

In Australia, Caringbah Bus Service, Delwood Coaches and Peakhurst Bus Company were among the buyers.

Production ceased in 1960. Total production of the MR11L Aberdonian was 471. Some Indonesian buses are given as MR11N and two Australian buses as MR11LSp.

== In service ==
Some operators found the Aberdonian underpowered, the vacuum brakes were not as effective as the air brakes of the Leyland Tiger Cub, and the Albion clutch gave problems and was replaced by the Leyland unit fitted to the Tiger Cub. In the final year of production the larger Leyland O375H of 6.15 litres developing 107 bhp (80 kW) became optional. Most of the UK vehicles served a full life with their respective operators but the SOL example and the three Western SMT coaches were transferred to Alexanders when around 5 years old. When W Alexander & Sons was split into three, Midland had one Aberdonian, Fife had four and Northern (whose head office was in Aberdeen) had the rest, including the ex-Western coaches and the ex SOL saloon.

== Preservation ==
Five Aberdonians are preserved including a former Gardiner's Plaxton-bodied 41-seat coach.

== Sources ==
- Adams & Milligan, Albion of Scotstoun, Paisley 1999
- Kaye, Buses Since 1945, London 1968
- Albion Motors brochure L680b, November 1959
- Hutchinson, Venture of Consett, Glossop 2003
- Albion Vehicle Preservation Trust
- Booth(ed) Classic Bus 26, Edinburgh November 1996.
