= Leyland Tiger Cub =

British lightweight underfloor-engined bus chassis

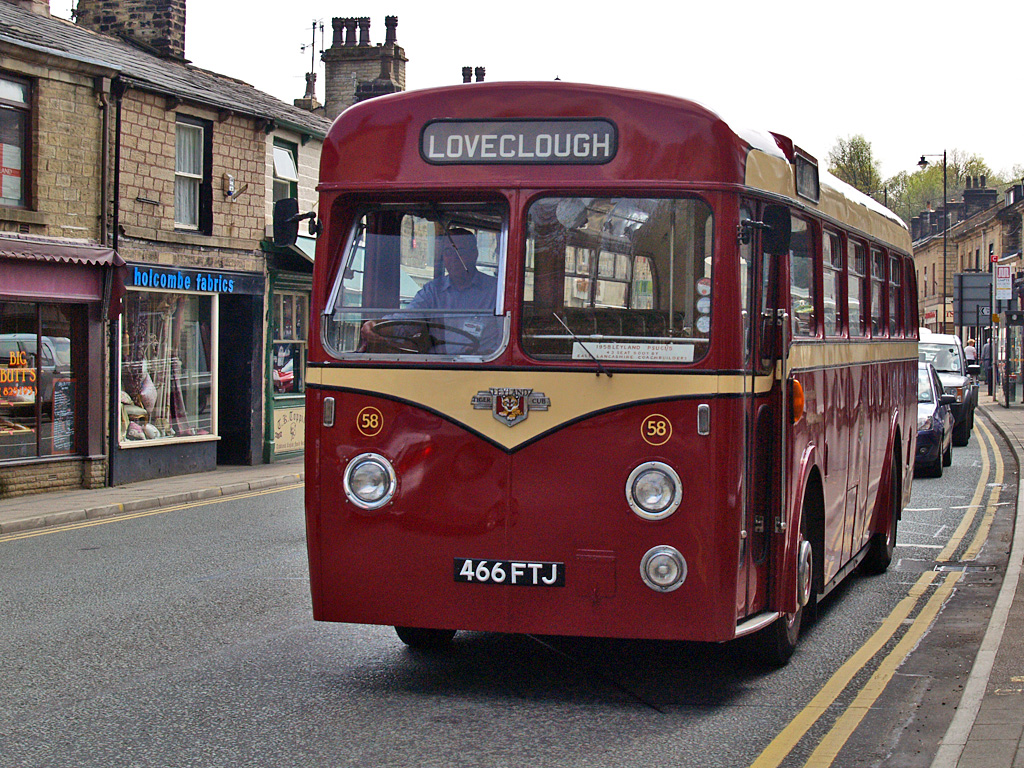
- Preserved Rawtenstall Corporation East Lancs bodied Tiger Cub in Ramsbottom in May 2008

Overview
- Manufacturer: Leyland
- Production: 1952-1970

Body and chassis
- Doors: 1
- Floor type: Step entrance

Powertrain
- Engine: Leyland O.350; Leyland O.375H; Leyland O.400H
- Capacity: 350 cubic inches (5.74 litres); 375 cubic inches (6.15 litres); 400 cubic inches (6.55 litres)
- Power output: 91 bhp; 105 bhp; 125 bhp

The Leyland Tiger Cub (coded as PSUC1) was a lightweight underfloor-engined chassis manufactured by Leyland between 1952 and 1970.

== History ==
The Leyland Tiger Cub was launched in 1952. Most were built as 44-45 seat buses, with a smaller number as coaches. The standard bodied dimensions were 30 ft (9.1 m) long by 8 ft (2.4 m) wide, the UK maximum at launch in 1952.

It was named when a lighter-weight chassis was introduced in 1952 as a modification to the older Leyland Royal Tiger (type PSU1), which was regarded by certain influential customers, especially in the BET group of privately managed bus companies, as overweight, over-specified and too expensive, those who were operating it were also finding vacuum-servo versions under-braked.

The Tiger Cub was powered initially by a Leyland O350H 91bhp 5.76-litre diesel engine, a horizontal version of the engine fitted to the Comet 90. It had a newly designed lightweight high straight frame with a vertical radiator set just behind the front axle. The launch transmission was the same four-speed constant mesh unit which had been used in the Tiger PS1, Titan PD1 and their export equivalents.

There was a choice of either a single-speed or two-speed rear axle, both of spiral-bevel form and derived from the Comet 90 design, the latter using an electrically actuated Eaton driving head in a Leyland casing. Wheels were of the eight-stud type and diaphragm-type air braking was standard. This was the first time Leyland had offered a bus chassis without another braking option, whilst vacuum or vacuum-hydraulic brakes were still standard across most of the UK bus and coach industry.

== Prototypes ==
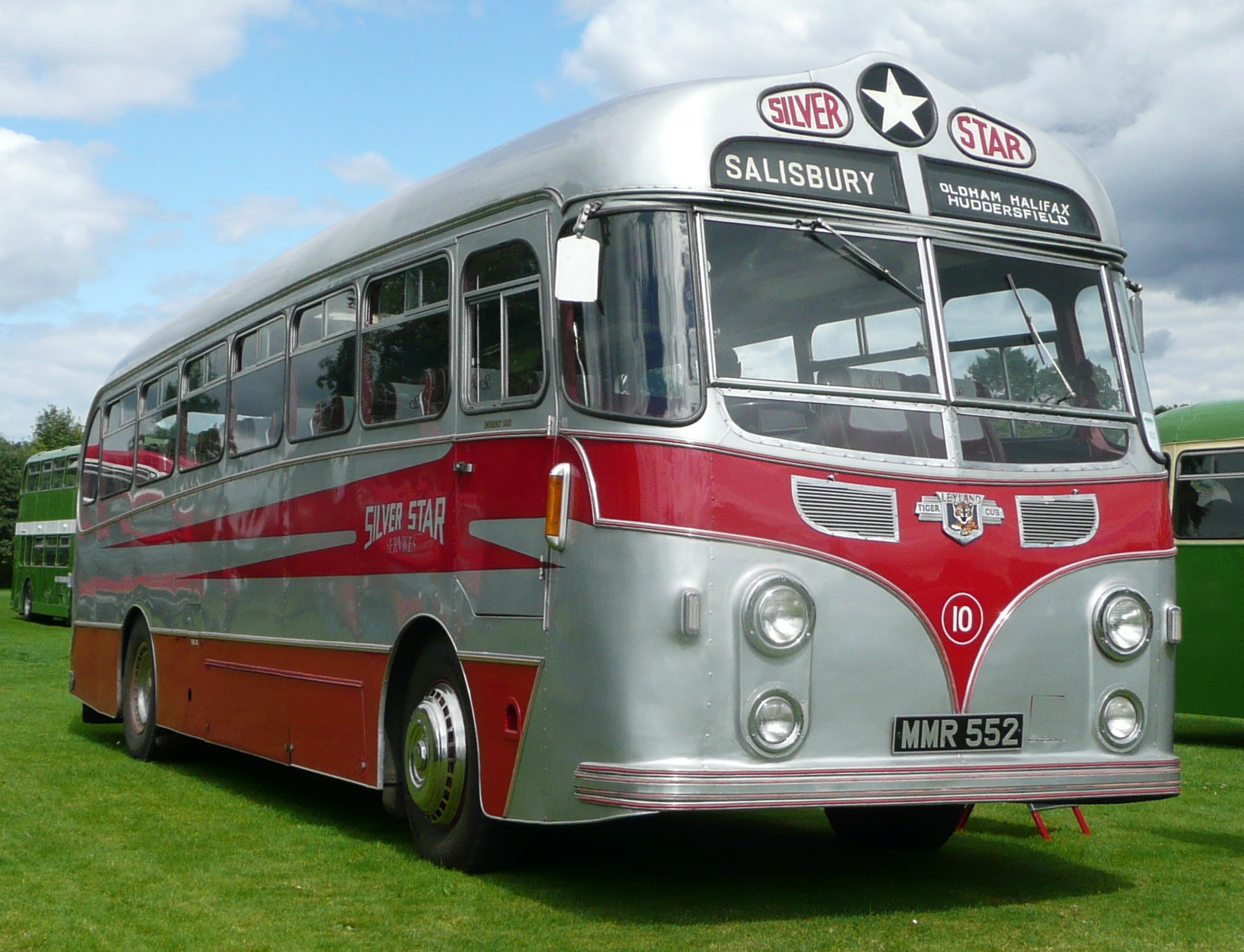
Preserved Silver Star Harrington bodied Tiger Cub in July 2008

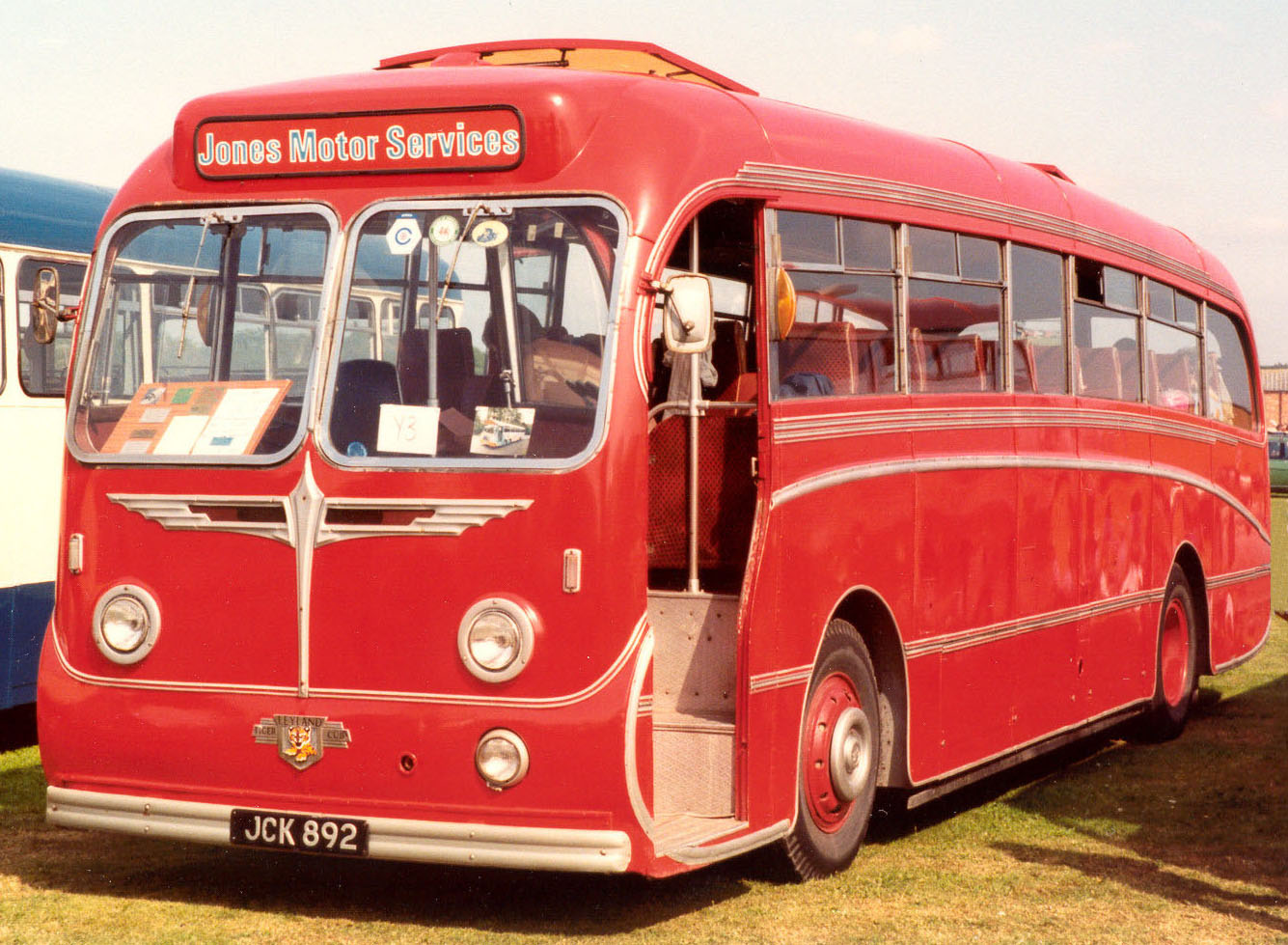
Preserved Burlingham bodied Tiger Cub in August 1983

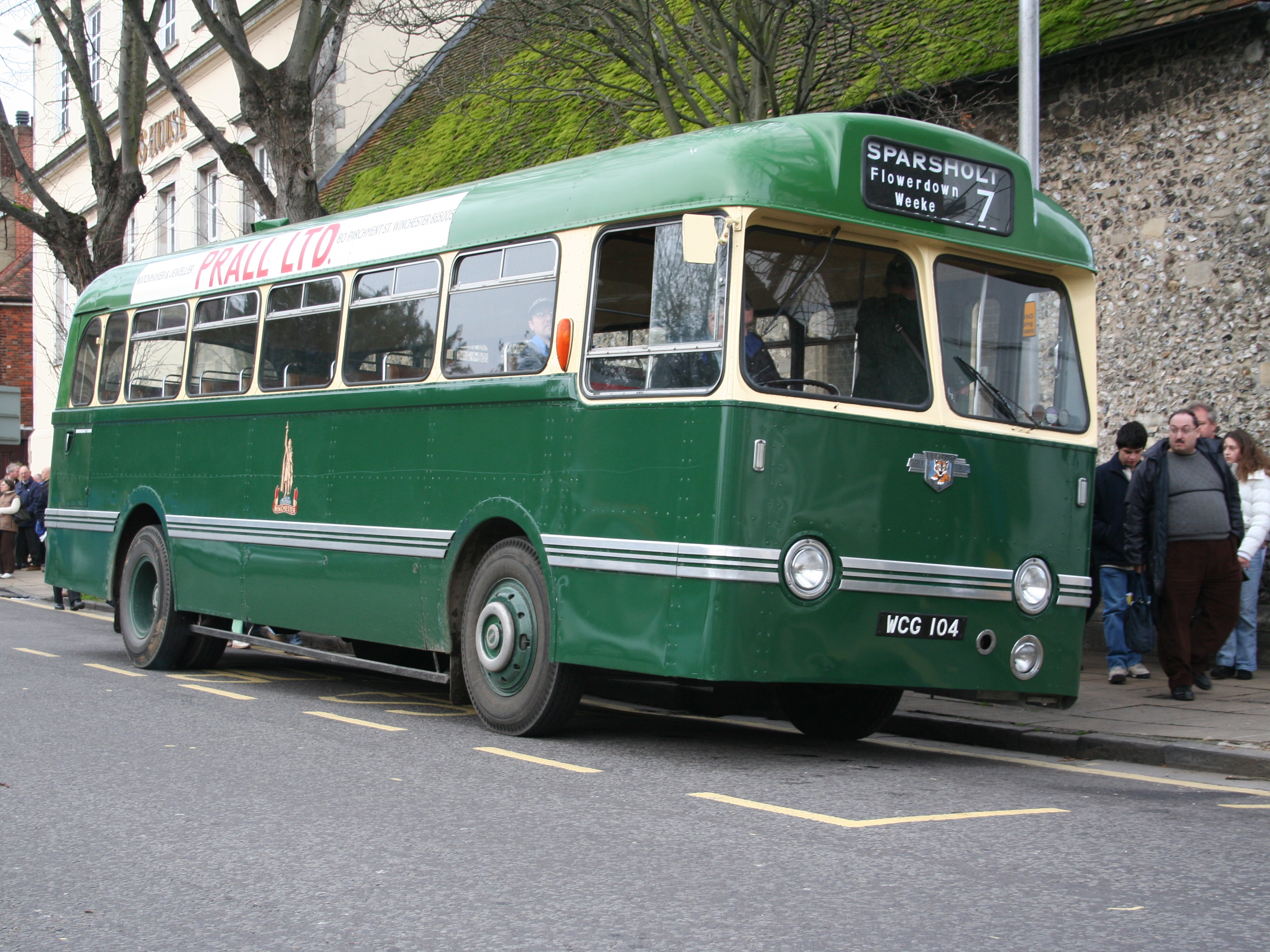
Preserved Weymann bodied Tiger in January 2007

The prototypes were bodied by Saunders-Roe of Anglesey as 44-seat buses working initially for Midland Red while the second was shown on the Leyland stand at the 1952 Commercial Motor Show in the livery of Ribble Motor Services. At the show it was announced that the BET group had placed an order for 500 of the new chassis to be bodied in 1953 and 1954. The bodied Tiger Cub weighed around two tons less than an equivalent Royal Tiger, with commensurate savings in fuel.

After the show the body was removed from the second demonstrator and fitted on a production chassis. It was to be the first of many Ribble Tiger Cubs, whilst Midland Red never purchased new examples of the type. The debodied chassis was updated to production specification and sent to Walter Alexander Coachbuilders, Stirling for bodying as a demonstrator until 1956 when it was sold to Stark's Motor Services, Dunbar. Many later Tiger Cubs were rebodied, generally after accident damage, but occasionally when a coach operator wanted a more up to date appearance. The last such rebodying was done for Western Welsh by Willowbrook in 1971.

== Production options ==
The initial production model was type PSUC1/1T, with the two-speed axle as standard. Omission of this was a no-cost option, in which case the T-suffix was omitted.

In 1953 two variants emerged. For coaching duties type PSUC1/2T had a dropped-frame extension at the rear for a luggage boot and a higher-ratio rear axle for a higher road speed. Among the first customers were Scout of Preston, an independent coach operator who competed with Ribble on Lancashire to London express services. They had the first five Duple Elizabethan-bodied coaches in early 1954.

In 1952 Leyland had bought into Self-Changing Gears. This company owned the patents for the preselective type of epicyclic gearbox which Leyland had fitted to the RTL and RTW Titans it sold to London Transport. It was working on a new type of direct-acting epicyclic gearbox at the time of the Leyland takeover. Leyland announced this product in 1953 as the Pneumocyclic; the first two demonstrators were a Titan and a Tiger Cub. The Tiger Cub was demonstrated to London Transport during 1953/54 alongside an AEC Monocoach and a Bristol LS6G.

This version of chassis had a four speed transmission with direct-air pedestal shift and entered production as type PSUC1/3 from 1955. Also in that year two versions for 7 ft 6 in (2.29 m) wide coachwork were announced; these differed from the previous types in having narrower axles. These were type PSUC1/4 with Pneumocyclic gearbox and PSUC1/5 with constant mesh.

Two revisions to specification which were not accompanied by a change in specification number were from 1957 when an Albion five-speed constant-mesh gearbox became an option for manual-transmission chassis and from 1958 when the 105bhp 6.15 litre O375H engine became optional across the range.

Although conceived for the home market, export versions were soon introduced, these were the OPSUC1, with heavier duty tyres and suspension, and the LOPSUC1, which also had left hand drive, suffixes and options as for home market models.

In 1962 the power unit became the 125 bhp 6.75-litre O400H and the type codes were revised, to PSUC1/11, PSUC1/12T and PSUC1/13. These were respectively manual bus, manual coach and pneumocyclic bus versions. The narrow models were discontinued. At this time the manual transmission options changed to Leyland 4-speed synchromesh or Albion 5-speed constant mesh. Production continued until 1969.

The last Tiger Cub was bodied by Fowler of Leyland as a 44-seat bus and entered service with their parent company John Fishwick & Sons in January 1970. It has been preserved.

== Operators ==
The BET group were the largest purchasers in England and Wales. Of their subsidiaries, Western Welsh with a fleet of 271 had the most. In Scotland the largest customer was Walter Alexander & Sons who took 200 between 1955 and 1964. The largest municipal fleet was that of Edinburgh Corporation, who took 100 from 1959 to 1961, these were also the largest fleet of pneumocyclic Tiger Cubs. The Ulster Transport Authority in Northern Ireland and JMT on Jersey were the major customers for the narrow manual version, which Jersey initially took with shorter than standard rear overhang, reducing length to around 27 ft (8.2 m). West Bromwich Corporation took seven of the narrow pneumocyclic version, the only ones built. Independents took Tiger Cubs as buses, coaches and dual-purpose vehicles, but as with the municipal Market, the Tiger Cub was not as strong a seller as the AEC Reliance.

== Exports ==
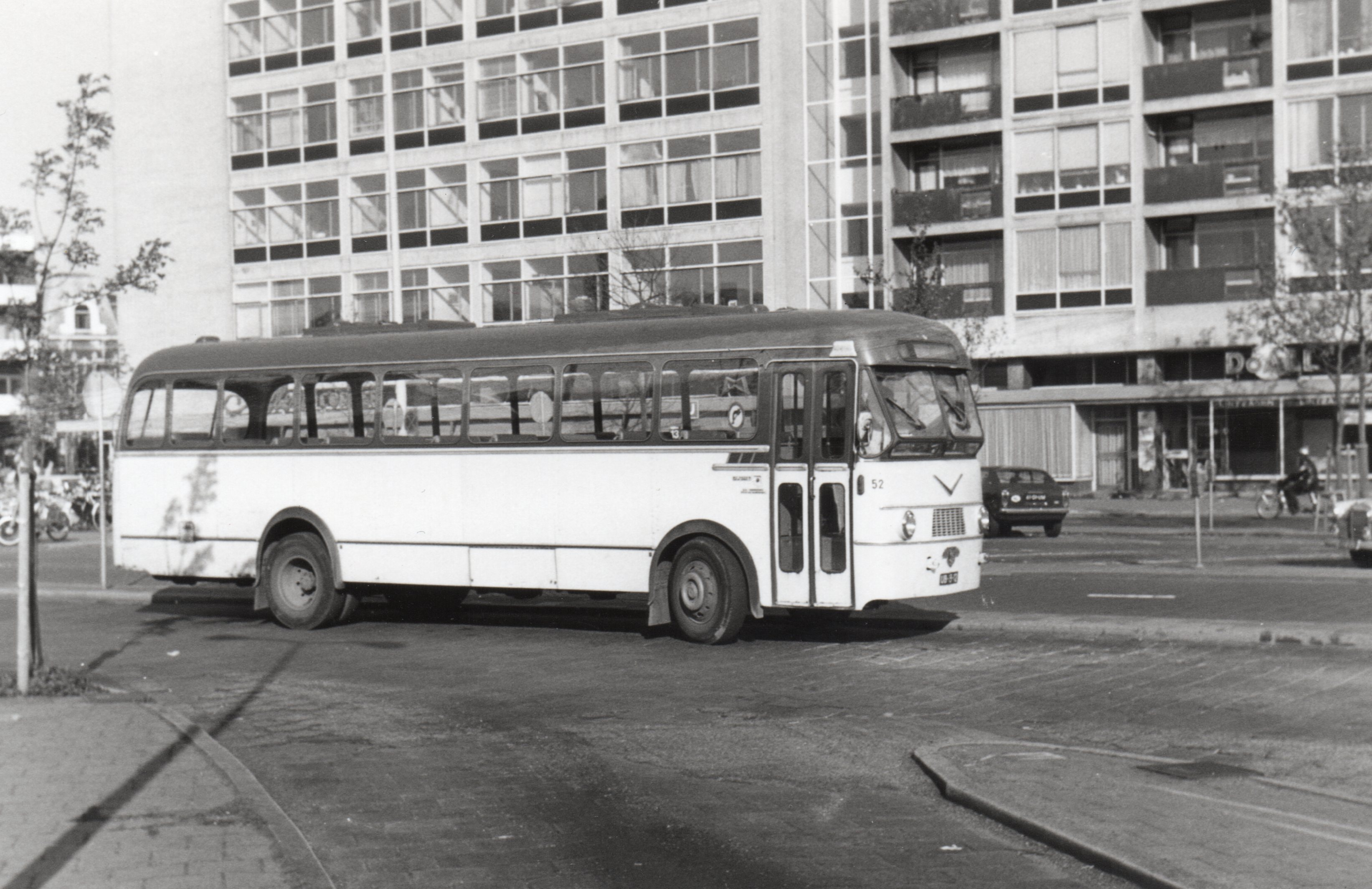
Verheul bodied Tiger Cub LOPSUC1/1, built in 1960 and owned by independent Dutch operator Maarse & Kroon, in Leiden in 1972

Major export markets for the Tiger Cub were Ceylon (Sri Lanka), Denmark, Ghana, the Netherlands, India, Jamaica, New Zealand and Portugal. Leyland often sold export batches with Metro Cammell Weymann bodywork, but bodies were also produced by other UK firms and by local coachbuilders.

In Australia, the Metropolitan Transport Trust in Perth purchased 120 between 1965 and 1967. Some were also purchased by Fearne's Coaches and Melbourne-Brighton Bus Lines.

Some second-hand Tiger Cubs were imported into Australia from Sweden and the United Kingdom in the 1970s and operated by Fearne's Coaches, Ingleburn Bus Service and Oliveri's Bus Service.

== Derivatives ==
- Leyland-MCW Olympian LW (1956-59)
- Albion Aberdonian (1957–60)
- Leyland Leopard L1/L2 (1959–67)
- Leyland Panther Cub (1964-68)
- Verheul LV45 (1960s)
