= Harrington Legionnaire =

British 1960s coach

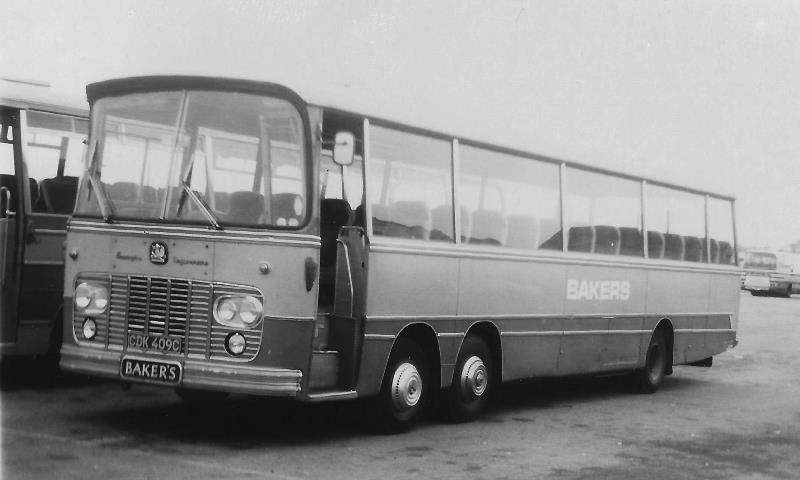
- Harrington Legionnaire on Bedford VAL chassis, CDK409C

Overview
- Manufacturer: Thomas Harrington Ltd
- Production: 1963–1965
- Assembly: Hove, Sussex

Body and chassis
- Doors: 1 door
- Floor type: Step entrance
- Chassis: Bedford VAL; Ford Thames 676E; Guy Victory

Powertrain
- Engine: Leyland O.400 straight six diesel engine
- Transmission: Manual

Dimensions
- Length: 11 Meters (36ft)

The Harrington Legionnaire is an 11-metre (36 ft) passenger coach body built by Thomas Harrington Ltd in Hove, Sussex between 1963 and 1965. It was built on three-axle Bedford VAL, two-axle Ford Thames 676E, and two specials on Guy Victory tram bus chassis.

The design was never a success and very few were built.

== Design ==
The Harrington Legionnaire was a square-rigged body with straight waist rail and five deep windows per side. It also differed from the company's Cavalier and Grenadier models by having plated window surrounds; a large brightwork grille with twin headlights; and a Grenadier-style front windscreen duplicated as a rear door. Above the windscreen was a destination box or illuminated nameboard beneath a prominent peak.

At the rear the illuminated nameboard was inside the rear glass and fitted the other way about to the front, meaning the first and last pillars had a pronounced forward rake to them whilst all the others were vertical. The cantrail flat above it was a roof section of very shallow curvature.

The Mark 2 following in 1964 for the final two seasons omitted this flat cantrail and had a roof of compound curvature, which reduced the tall square effect of the original but reduced space in the overhead luggage racks.

== The Italian Job ==
The Harrington was featured in the 1969 film, The Italian Job, Legionnaire bodied Bedford VAL14 'ALR 453B', new in April 1964 to Batten of London.

For use in the film, it was modified to reinforce the bulkhead behind the driver's seat to allow the Mini Cooper S getaway cars to be driven into the bus safely. Even still, there was enough force in the event to push the driver into the steering wheel.

True to the film story, the destination displays on the coach showed London-Turin and then the opposite at the end of the film. It also displays 'Charlie Croker's Coach Tours' logos on the rear and both flanks, a reference to Michael Caine's character.

After the film, in 1969, it was converted back to a coach by William Marshall of Blackpool. In 1971 it was in use by Edmund Birch of Liverpool, who ran it as 'Wendy's Coaches.' It was then acquired by dealer Andrew Drummond, Harthill, Scotland, who sold it to James Meffan in Kirriemuir, Scotland. It was then purchased by Archie Cromer of Bridge Garage, Anstruther, and converted into a racing car transporter/caravan. It then became a horsebox, in 1983, and a motorcycle/sidecar transporter in 1986. In 1990 it was broken for scrap by Bill Davie of Fife. Corgi Toys released a sought-after gift set which included the three Mini Cooper cars (albeit incorrectly modelled on much newer Minis) in 1:36 scale and a 1:50 scale Plaxton Panorama 1-bodied Bedford VAL coach, in place of the Harrington Legionnaire which accuracy demanded.

== See also ==
- List of buses
