= Bedford Y series =

Bedford Y Series
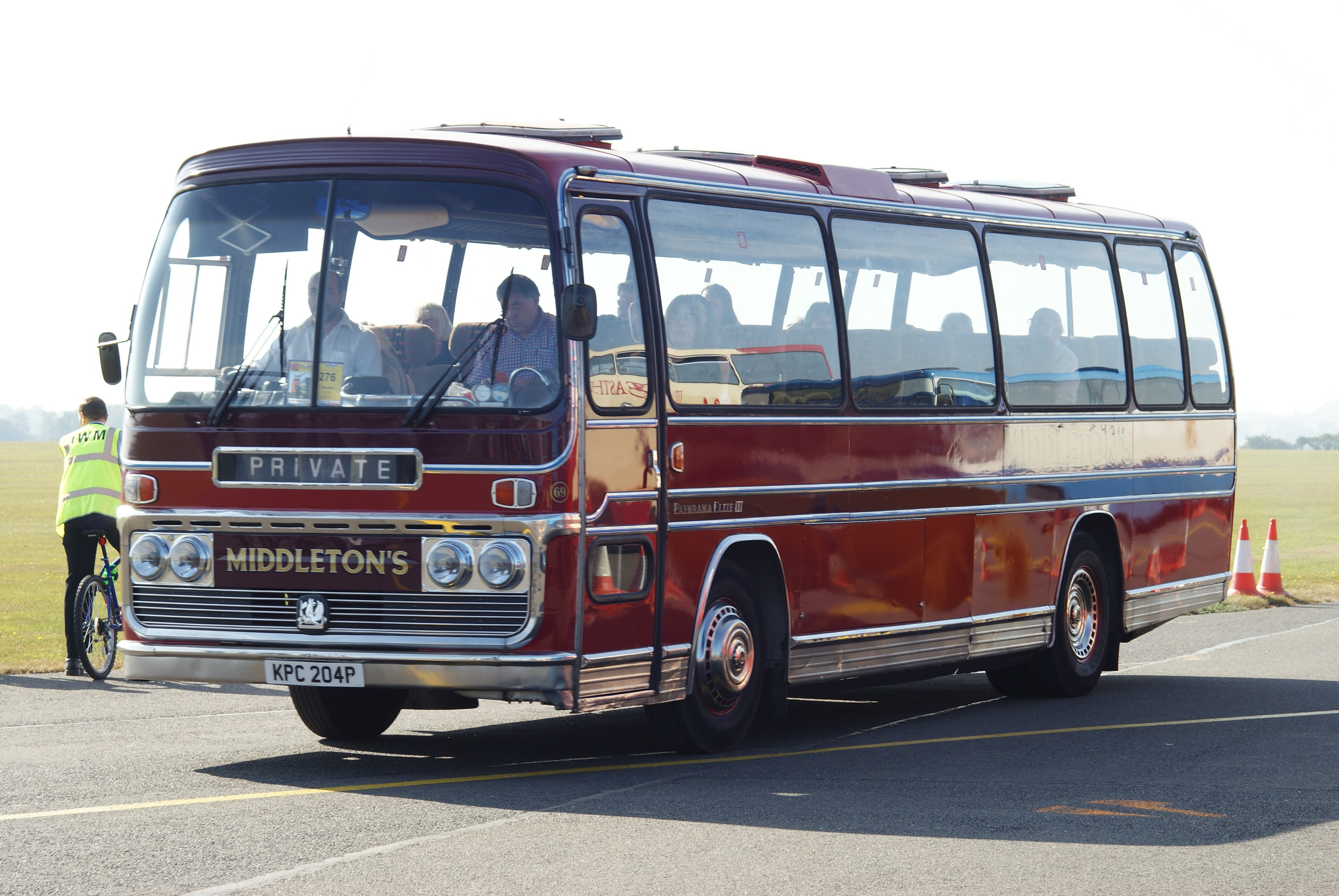
- A Bedford YRQ with Plaxton Panorama Elite bodywork

Overview
- Manufacturer: Bedford
- Production: 1971–1986
- Assembly: Luton

Body and chassis
- Doors: 1-2
- Floor type: Step entrance
- Chassis: Straight ladder frame

Powertrain
- Engine: Bedford; Perkins; Leyland; Cummins
- Transmission: 4-speed synchromesh 5-speed

Chronology
- Predecessor: Bedford VAM; Bedford VAL

The Bedford Y series was a family of single-decker bus and single-decker coach chassis manufactured by Bedford from 1970 to 1986, when Bedford ceased bus and truck production.

== History ==
Announced in September 1970, the Bedford YRQ was a 10-metre (33 ft) coach chassis intended to replace the Bedford VAM. The engine was mounted centrally under the floor.

In 1972 an 11-metre (36 ft) version, the YRT, entered production as a replacement for the twin-steer Bedford VAL.

New more powerful engines were introduced in 1975 with the YLQ (10 m) and YMT (11 m).

The 1980 YNT was a development of the YMT with a turbocharged engine, while the YLQ became the YMQ and then the YMP.

The 12-metre YNV Venturer with air suspension was the final development of the Y series, announced in 1984.

Bus and truck production by Bedford ceased in 1986.

== Chassis summary ==
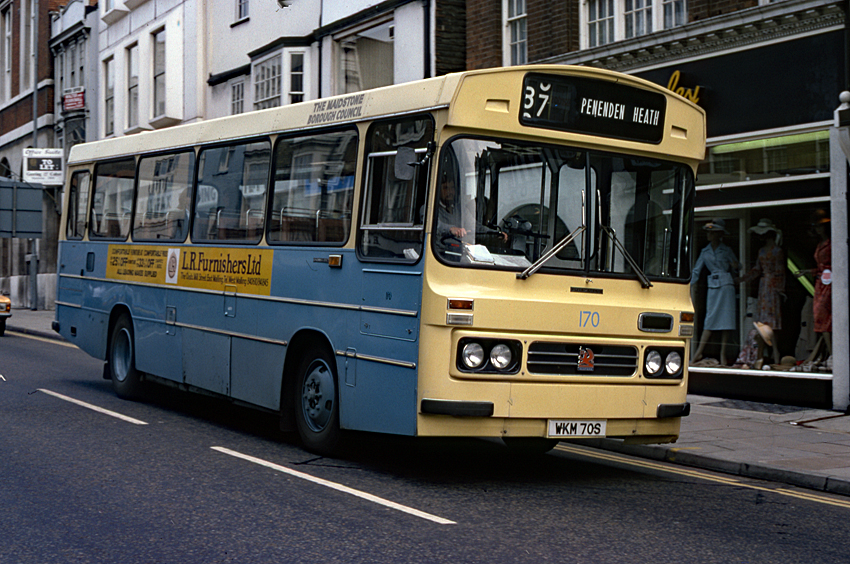
Maidstone BC Bedford YLQ Duple Dominant WKM 70S, 1980

The Y series was produced in four different lengths; 8m, 10m, 11m and 12m. The majority were bodied as coaches, though the 8m, 10m and 11m versions were also built as single-decker buses and midibuses. Seating capacities varied, but were typically 45 for a 10m bus or coach and 53 for an 11m. The 12m version was built almost exclusively as a coach, with one exception where a Plaxton Paramount coach body shell was fitted out with bus seats in a high-capacity layout.

- Bedford Y series
  - Eight metres
    - YMP/S
  - Ten metres
    - YRQ
    - YLQ
    - YMQ
    - YMP
  - Eleven metres
    - YRT
    - YMT
    - YNT
  - Twelve metres
    - YNV Venturer

Model codes were part of a system introduced by General Motors in 1968. Under this, the first letter (in this case, Y) denoted the basic model range; the second letter denoted the engine type; and the third letter the gross weight range for a complete vehicle. Those applicable to the Y series were as follows:

Engine codes
Letter	Type
L	8.2 litres (500 in^{3}) diesel, derated to 110 kW (150 bhp)
M	8.2 litres (500 in^{3}) diesel, 119 kW (160 bhp) naturally aspirated or 130 kW (170 bhp) turbocharged
N	8.2 litres (500 in^{3}) diesel, 153 kW (205 bhp) turbocharged
R	7.64 litres (466 in^{3}) diesel

Gross weight codes
Letter	Range
P	9,500–10,400 kg (9.3–10.2 long tons)
Q	10,000–11,100 kg (9.8–10.9 long tons)
T	13,200–14,500 kg (13.0–14.3 long tons)
V	14,100–16,300 kg (13.9–16.0 long tons)

A further four digits or letters denoted wheelbase, transmission and body type, and the full seven-character code was incorporated in the VIN for each individual vehicle.

The Bedford Y series was sold extensively in the United Kingdom, mainly to independent operators, as well as in export markets. It was fitted with a wide variety of bodies by different manufacturers, chiefly Duple and Plaxton.
