= Plaxton Panorama Elite =

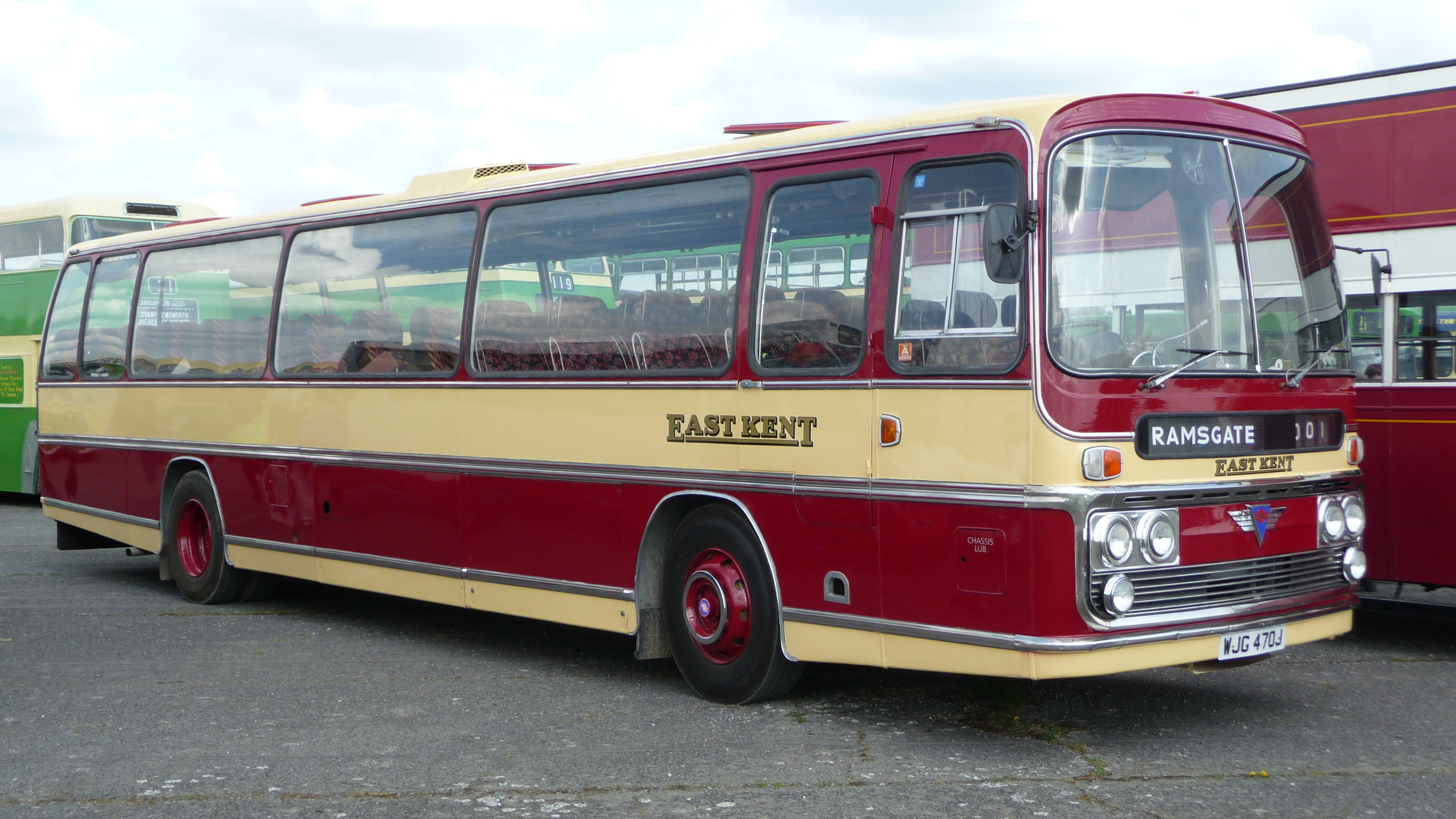
- Panorama Elite II bodywork on an AEC Reliance chassis.

Overview
- Manufacturer: Plaxton
- Production: 1968 - 1975

Body and chassis
- Doors: 1
- Floor type: Step entrance
- Chassis: Leyland Leopard; Leyland Panther; AEC Reliance; Bedford VAL; Bedford VAM; Bedford Y series; Volvo B58; Bristol RE; Bristol LH; Ford R-Series; Seddon Pennine IV and VI; Mercedes-Benz O302; Daimler Roadliner

The Plaxton Panorama Elite was a successful design of coach bodywork built between 1968 and 1975 by Plaxton of Scarborough, Yorkshire, England. A wide-doorway variant called the Plaxton Elite Express was also built. Collectively, they are commonly referred to as the Plaxton Elite.

It was preceded by the Plaxton Panorama I, and replaced by the Plaxton Supreme. Around 6,000 Elites were built.

== Chassis ==
The Elite was built on a number of different chassis, including:

- Leyland Leopard and Panther
- Daimler Roadliner
- AEC Reliance
- Bedford Y series, VAL and VAM
- Volvo B58
- Bristol RE and LH
- Ford R-Series
- Seddon Pennine IV and VI
- Mercedes-Benz O302

== Design features ==
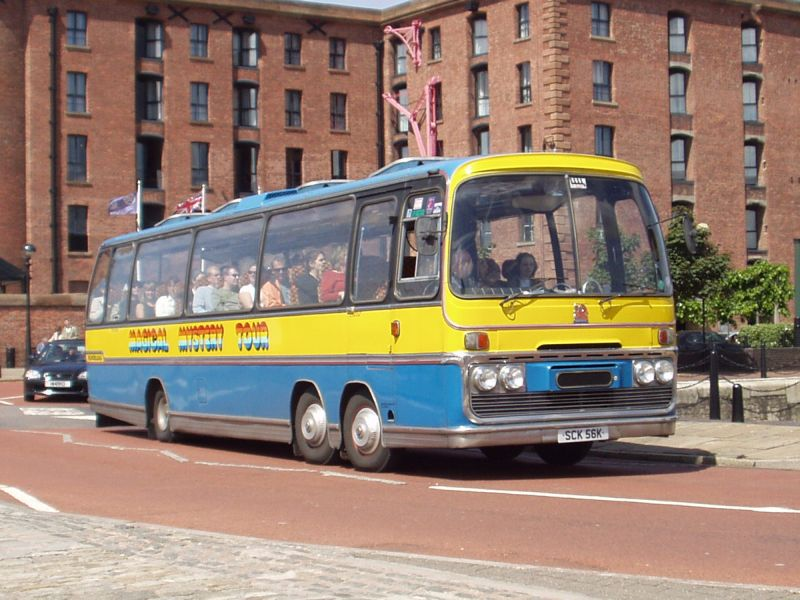
A Bedford VAL Panorama replica of the one used in The Beatles 1967 film Magical Mystery Tour

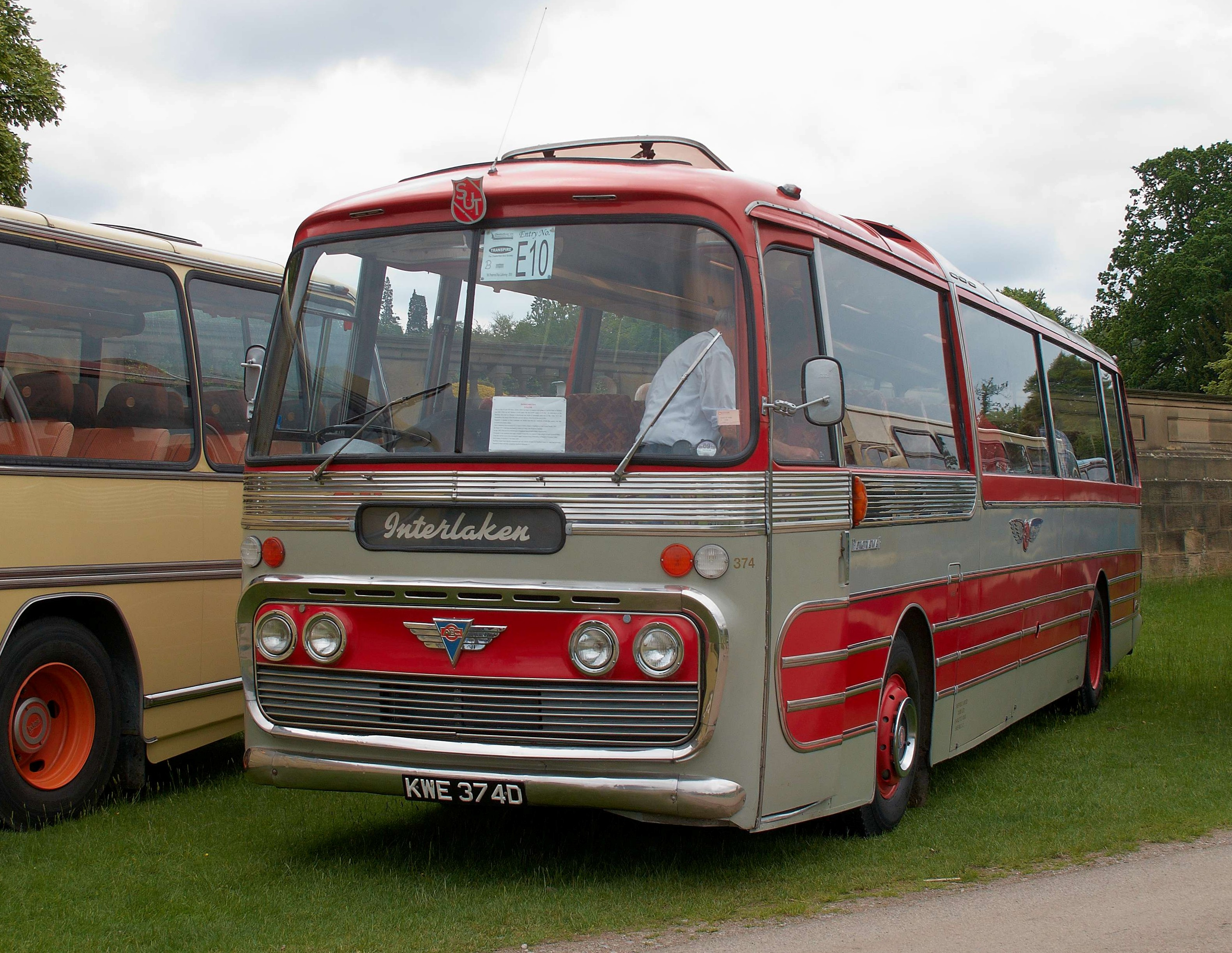
The Panorama body, which preceded the Panorama Elite, had flat side windows

The Panorama Elite has continuously bowed sides, front and rear ends. It has large, bowed, round-cornered side windows mounted in rubber (the Panorama series had flat side windows mounted in metal frames with square corners) and double-curvature windscreens which are the same at front and rear of the coach. There is a shallow ridged area above the front windscreen.

Extensive use is made of brightwork. Up to four beaded chrome strips run along the side of the vehicle, as well as ribbed skirt panels. The front grille and headlights are contained within a distinctive chrome surround which merges with the side brightwork.

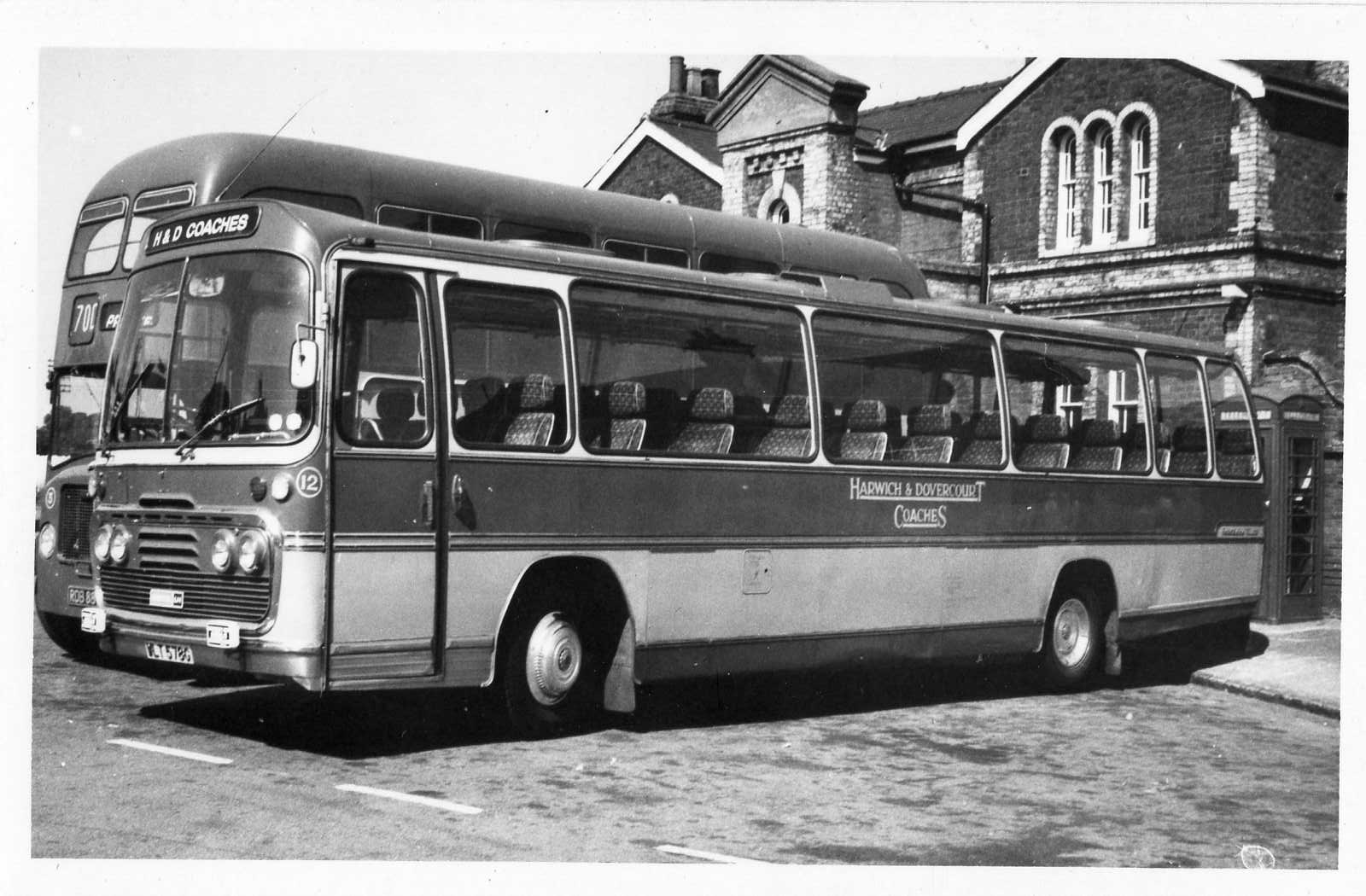
A Bristol LH with Panorama Elite body; above the windscreen is the destination box mounted in a Bristol dome

A destination box was sometimes fitted. Usually this was just below the windscreen, above the level of the headlights; on some models, mainly front-engined Bedfords and Fords, the destination box was mounted between the headlights. In either position, difficulties were found with some chassis having a high-set front-mounted radiator (in particular those manufactured by Bristol), where the position was needed for the radiator grille, so on these the destination box was above the windscreen, and this was known as the Bristol Dome.

== Versions ==
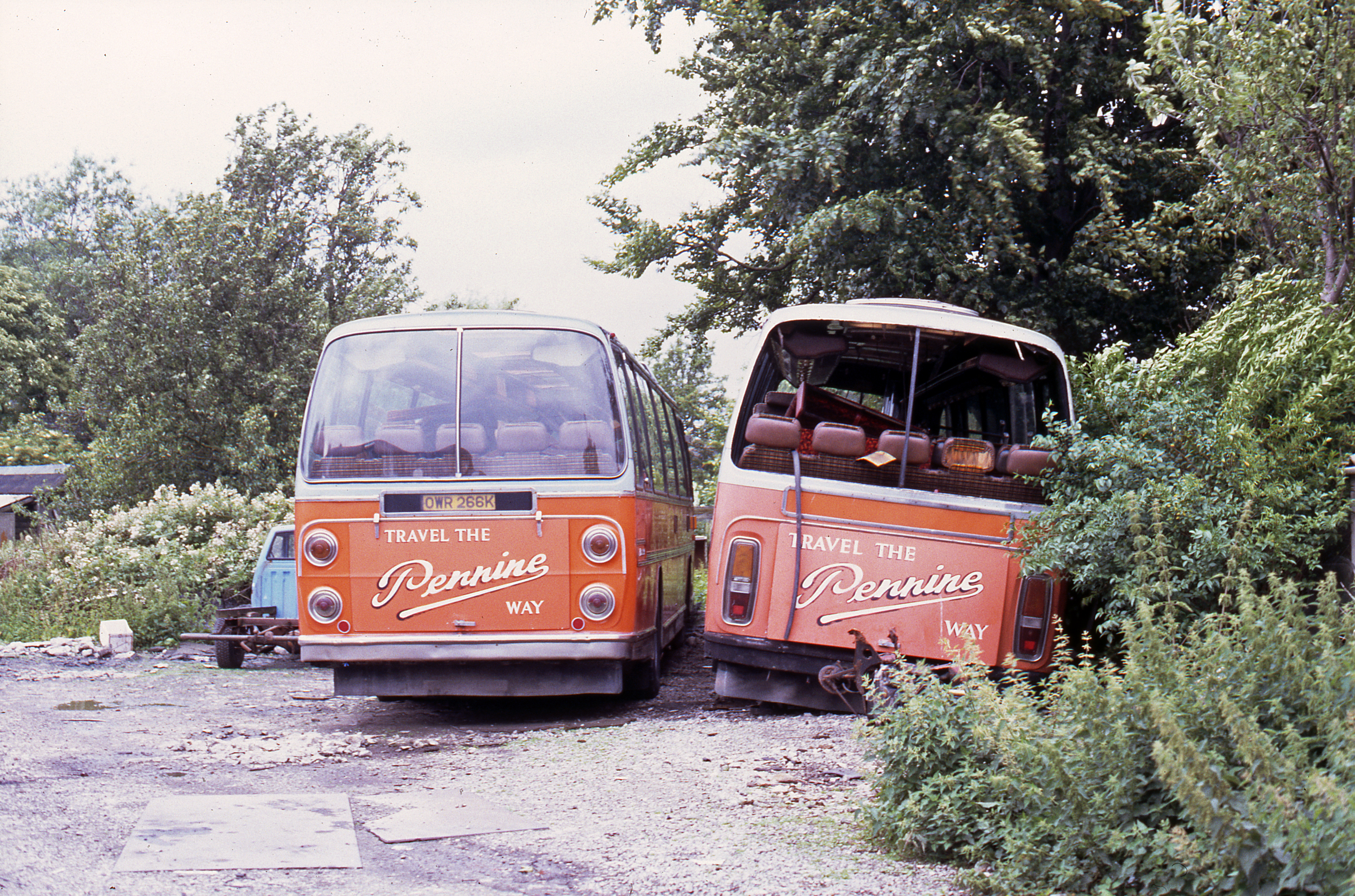
Contrast in rear light styles: Mark I and Mark II (left); Mark III (right)

=== Original ("Mark I") ===
The original Panorama Elite design, despite its all-new shape, retained the design of grille/headlight surround used on its predecessor, the Panorama I.

The offside emergency exit door was positioned directly behind the driver's cab, and a corresponding short window bay on the nearside, immediately behind the doorway, was of slightly reduced height.

The twin central brightwork strips run together along the side, separating close to the rear end and enclosing the badge. Twin round rear lights are arranged vertically at each side of the boot. An illuminated fleetname display is normally fitted above the boot.

=== Mark II ===
The Panorama Elite II introduced a new grille/headlight surround, slightly squarer and more closely integrated with the trim. The small window, which had been of reduced height on the original design, was made to be of standard height on the Mark II.

=== Mark III ===
The front end of the Mark III was largely the same as the Mark II, although the illuminated panel or destination display below the windscreen was squared off and given a chrome surround. Also, pantograph windscreen wipers were introduced, although some early Mark IIIs had the older type.

The twin round rear lights were replaced by a single, vertical, lozenge-shaped cluster.

The side trim was revised slightly, with the twin beading strips running separately along the length of the coach, only meeting at the very front. However, this was variable: some operators opted for the older layout instead; Barton Transport requested that the strips separate further back, allowing a larger space for their logo; the National Bus Company generally opted for only a single strip.

The emergency door initially remained behind the cab, but was subsequently repositioned close to the rear.

=== Elite Express ===
All three variants were also produced to the "Express" configuration with wider, two-piece doors. By making the coaches suitable for a dual-purpose role, this allowed operators to take advantage of the British Government's New Bus Grant towards their cost.

=== Other variations ===
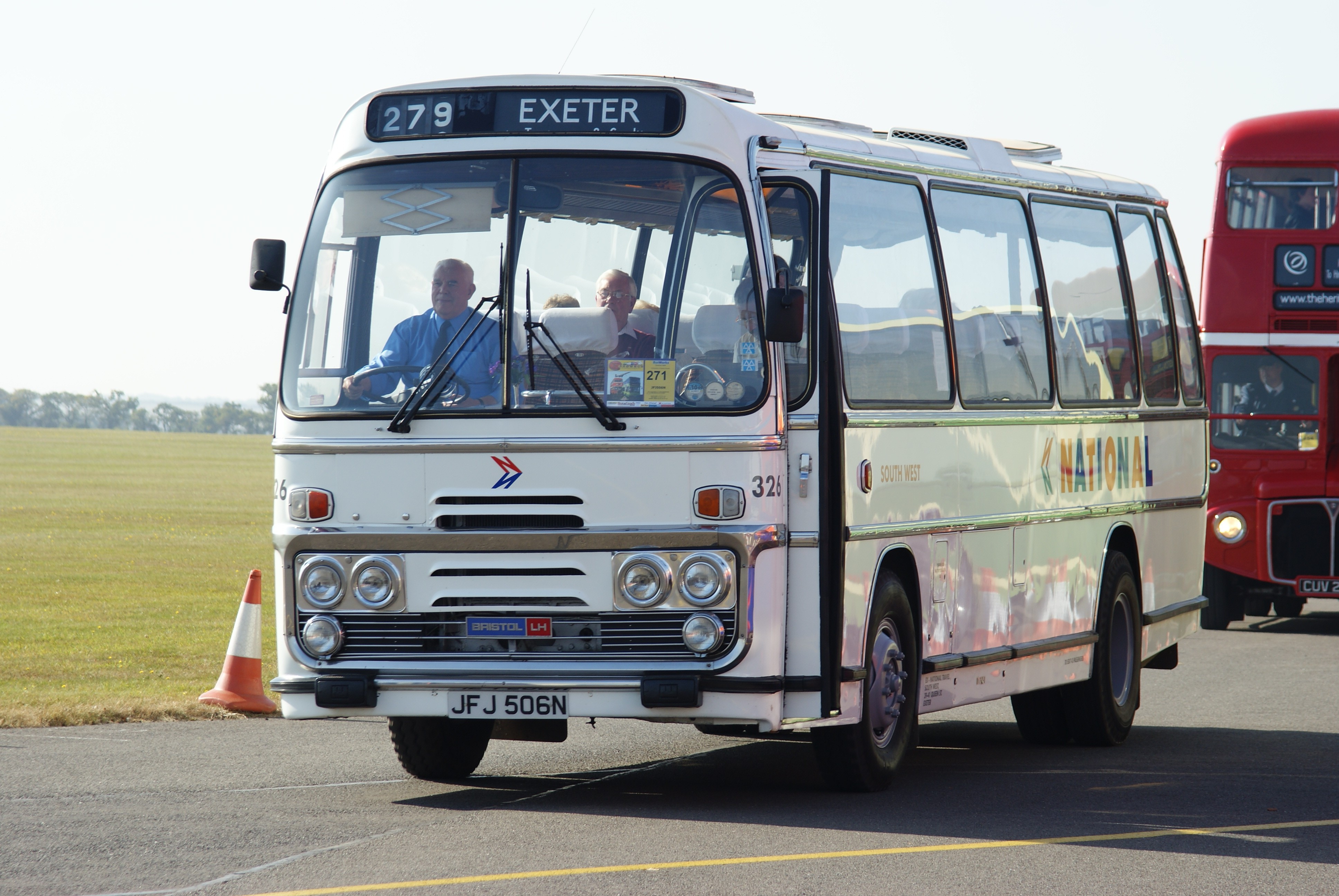
Panorama Elite III on Bristol LH6L chassis, 7'6" wide, with Bristol dome

A narrow 7 ft 6 in (2.29 m) width version was sold to some operators.

Bodywork built on Bristol chassis with front-mounted radiators did not have space for a destination indicator or illuminated panel in the usual position below the windscreen, so one was instead positioned in a bulge above the windscreen. This feature thus became known as a "Bristol Dome", even when it was later fitted to other types for different reasons.

Several different lengths were available, including 10 m (32 ft 10 in), 11 m (36 ft 1 in), 12 m (39 ft 4 in). Smaller vehicles, however, continued to be bodied using the older Panorama design, which was replaced by the Supreme in 1974 - a year earlier than it superseded the larger Elite.

== Critics ==
Bus and coach industry graphic designer Ray Stenning praised the looks of the Panorama Elite III in an article for Buses Annual 1981. He described it as Plaxton's "zenith", adding that it "looked just right [and] still looks just right".
