= Plaxton Centro =

Low-entry single-deck bus bodywork

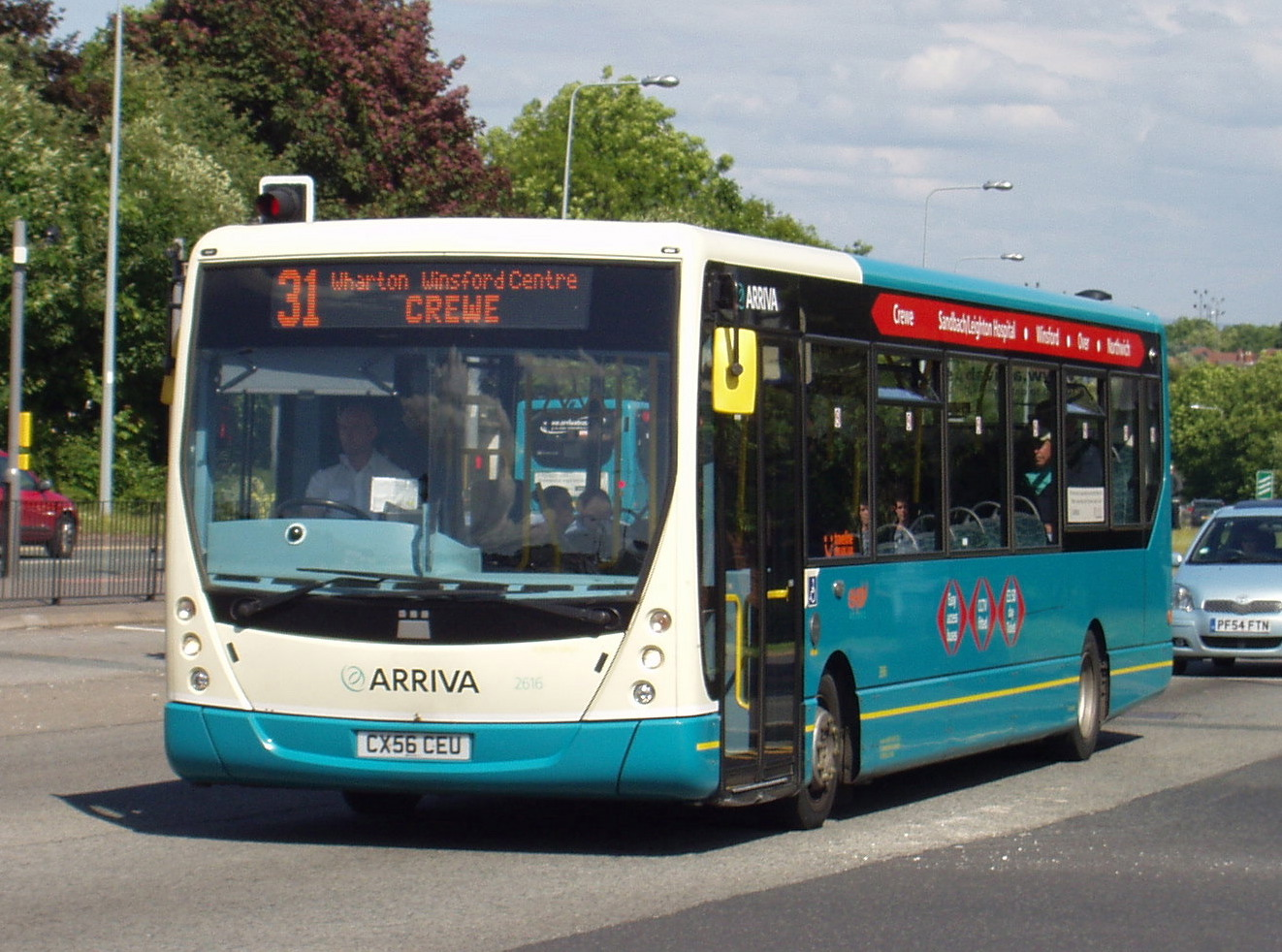
- Arriva North West & Wales Plaxton Centro bodied VDL SB120 in Winsford in June 2008

Overview
- Manufacturer: Plaxton
- Production: 2006–2009
- Assembly: Scarborough, North Yorkshire, England
- Designer: Capoco Design; Trailertech Services

Body and chassis
- Doors: 1
- Floor type: Low floor Low entry
- Chassis: VDL SB120; VDL SB200; MAN 12.240; MAN 14.220; MAN 14.240; Volvo B7RLE
- Related: Plaxton Primo

Powertrain
- Engine: Cummins ISBe (VDL); MAN (MAN); Volvo (Volvo B7RLE)
- Capacity: 51 seated, 21 standing

Dimensions
- Length: 8.9 to 12.0 m (29 ft 2 in to 39 ft 4 in)
- Width: 2.5 m (8 ft 2 in)
- Height: 3.0 m (9 ft 10 in)

Chronology
- Predecessor: Plaxton Pointer 2
- Successor: Alexander Dennis Enviro300

The Plaxton Centro was a low entry single-decker bus bodywork designed by Bluebird Vehicles and manufactured by Plaxton.

== Design ==
First announced in June 2005 and launched on the VDL SB120 chassis in February 2006, much of the Centro's design was influenced by the 'Concept 2000', a new body developed by Plaxton's then-owner Henlys for the Volvo B6BLE chassis which was cancelled upon the formation of Transbus International. Plaxton acquired the intellectual rights to the 'Concept 2000' upon Transbus' collapse and Plaxton's subsequent sale to Alexander Dennis, developing it with the assistance of Capoco Design into the Centro.

The new body, alongside the Primo minibus, were the first bus bodies built at Plaxton's Scarborough factory since Transbus moved production of the Pointer to Falkirk in 2001. After launching on the VDL SB120, the Centro was later made available on the VDL SB200 chassis, the MAN 14.220, MAN 14.240 and Volvo B7RLE chassis.

The Centro was assembled with an aluminium frame, with the front and rear portions of the bus assembled with Cromweld stainless steel panels and a galvanised steel underframe, the latter able to be specified for either a ramped floor for single set of doors or a fully-flat floor for dual-door specification; the interior dashboard panel and cab floor was a single glass fibre moulding. Bonded or gasket window glazing were also able to be specified, with side windows tinted as standard, and cantilevered or pedestal-mounted seats, able to be fitted with seatbelts, could be fitted in the interior.

By 2010, the Centro was no longer available from Plaxton after parent company Alexander Dennis phased it out in favour of the own Enviro200 and Enviro300. The last deliveries were in late 2010 and were 2009 season-built bodies.

== Operators ==
Among the first operators to take delivery of the Centro was TM Travel, who took delivery of a further eleven on VDL SB120 and MAN 12.220 chassis. Arriva North West & Wales was the first major customer, with 12 on VDL SB120 chassis delivered in late 2006; a further five were delivered to Arriva Scotland West and two were delivered to Arriva Midlands, and six on VDL SB200 chassis were delivered to Arriva The Shires, another six delivered to Arriva North West and two delivered to Arriva Northumbria.

Other large purchasers included Diamond Bus (25) , Centrebus (10) and Dunn-Line (10). The first Volvo B7RLE was purchased by Wessex Bus for the Bristol park & ride service.
