= Plaxton Primo =

Low-floor single-deck midibus body

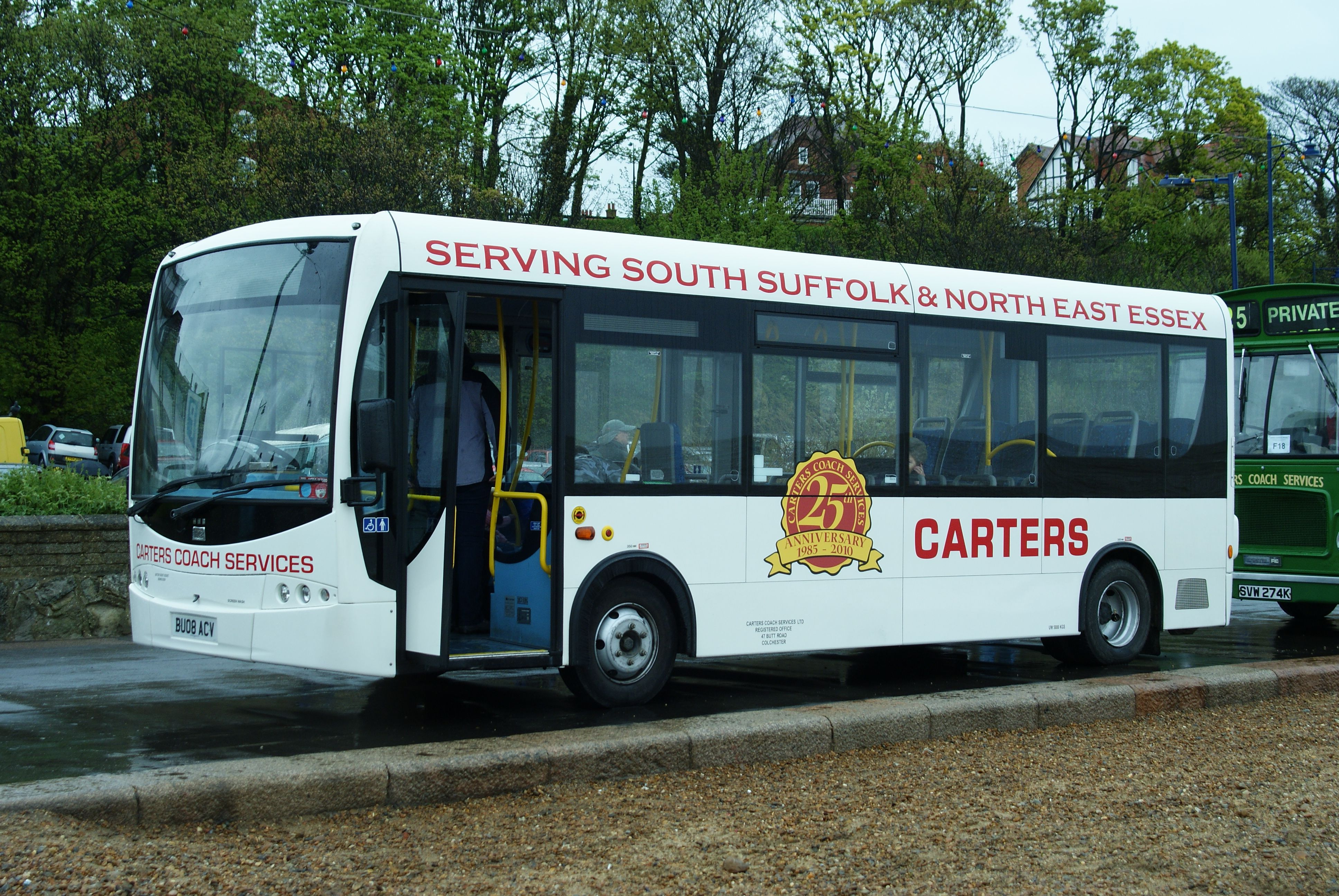
- Carters Plaxton Primo in Felixstowe in 2010

Overview
- Manufacturer: Plaxton
- Production: 2005–2010
- Assembly: Scarborough, England

Body and chassis
- Doors: 1
- Floor type: Low floor
- Chassis: Enterprise Bus Plasma

Powertrain
- Engine: Cummins ISBe
- Capacity: 27 Seated, 16 Standing; 43 passengers
- Power output: 138 bhp @ 2500 rpm
- Transmission: Allison 2000 Series 5-speed automatic

Dimensions
- Length: 7.9 m (26 ft)
- Width: 2.4 m (7 ft 10 in)
- Height: 2.73 m (8 ft 11 in)
- Curb weight: 3,500 to 12,000 kg (7,700 to 26,500 lb)

The Plaxton Primo was a low-floor minibus body manufactured by Plaxton on the Enterprise Bus Plasma chassis between 2005 and 2010.

== Design ==
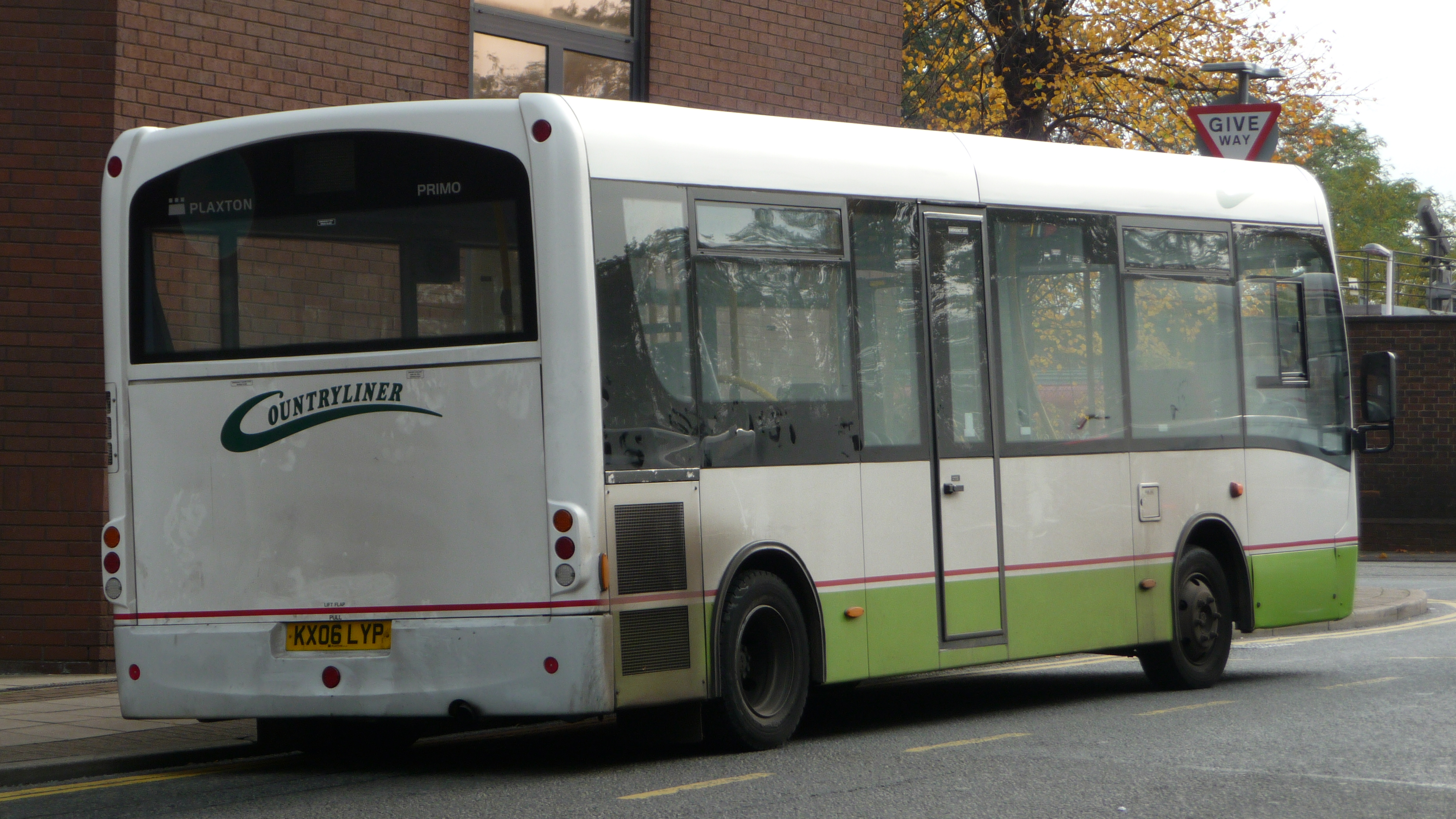
Rear of a Countryliner Plaxton Primo in Woking, Surrey in 2009

Launched in 2005, the Plaxton Primo body is the result of close cooperation between Enterprise Bus, the Hungarian chassis manufacturer, and Plaxton. The fully welded stainless steel integral chassis is supplied in right hand drive format as a running unit to Plaxton, with the final body assembly undertaken at their factory in Scarborough, England; the body and chassis design is also available in both single-leaf and two-door left hand drive form in Continental Europe. Much of the design of the Primo was also influenced the styling of the larger Centro.

The Plaxton Primo was originally intended to replace the Plaxton Beaver body, built on the Mercedes-Benz Vario chassis, but pressure from small operators such as Western Greyhound persuaded Plaxton to continue the Beaver, as the larger Primo could not fit down narrow roads that the Vario was suited to.

In 2008, Plaxton announced the Primo 2 with a number of modifications. The Primos in service were also modified to Mk2 form to enhance reliability.

== Operators ==
The Primo proved particularly popular with independent bus operators in England and Wales. The first two Primos were delivered to TM Travel of Halfway, Sheffield between late 2005 and early 2006. Some of the first Primos produced were distributed via Mistral Bus & Coach, which took delivery of a total of 25 for its rental business during 2006. Six were delivered to East Yorkshire Motor Services in July 2006 for use on local services in Bridlington, while another major customer for Primos towards the end of its production was Reays of Wigton, taking delivery of fourteen Primos during 2010.

== See also ==
- Optare Solo, the Plaxton Primo's integral competitor
- List of buses
