= Bedford VAL =

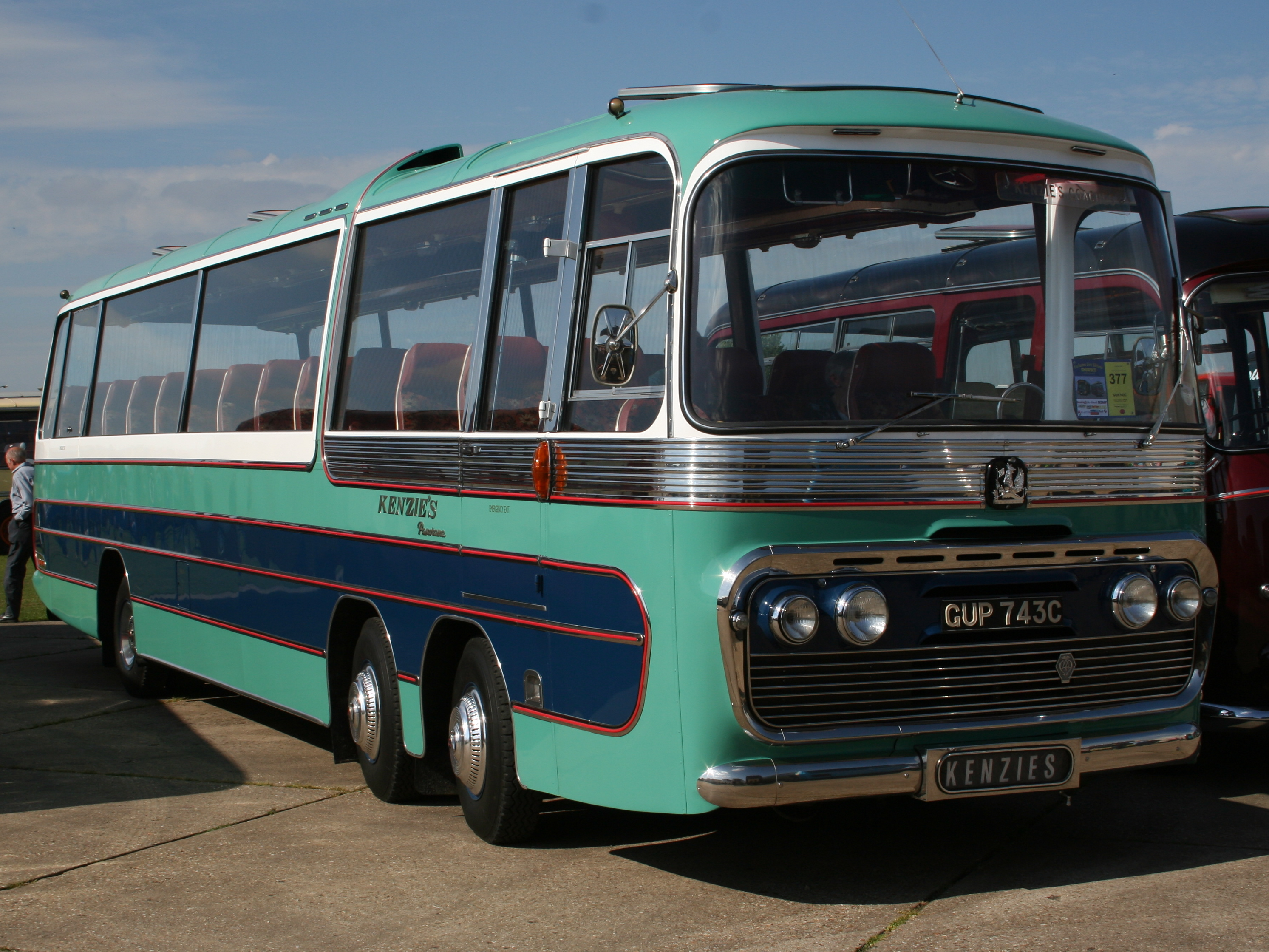
- Bedford VAL70 with Plaxton Panorama Elite II bodywork

Overview
- Manufacturer: Bedford (Bedford)
- Production: 1965–1975

Body and chassis
- Doors: 2 door
- Floor type: Step entrance

Chronology
- Predecessor: Bedford SB
- Successor: Bedford Y series

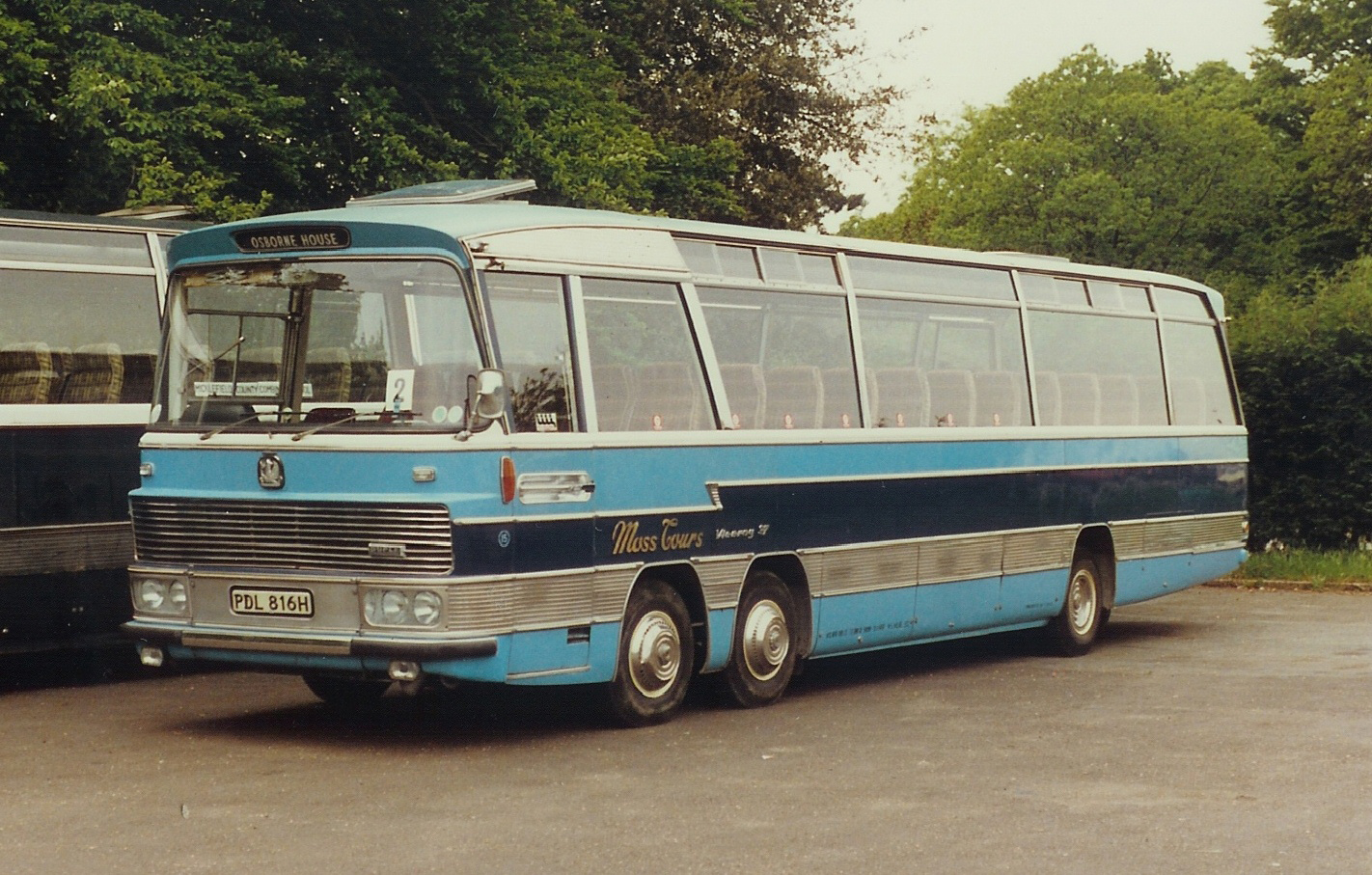
A 1970 built VAL70 with Duple Viceroy bodywork

The Bedford VAL is a type of coach chassis that was built by Bedford in the United Kingdom from the mid-1960s to the early 1970s. It was unusual at the time for its multi-axle design, in a "Chinese six" wheelplan, i.e. with two front steering axles.

Originally it was fitted with the Leyland O.400 straight six diesel engine. With this engine, the chassis was designated VAL14.

Over 900 VAL14s were built, from 1963 to 1966, with the largest orders coming from Wallace Arnold of Leeds, Seamarks of Westoning, Don Everall of Wolverhampton, and Bartons.

From 1967, the VAL70, with the slightly larger 466 cubic inches (7.64 L) engine of Bedford's own manufacture, quickly superseded the VAL14.

== Bodywork ==
The VAL was built with a number of bodies from different coachbuilders. The majority of VAL14s were of Duple or Plaxton origin, although VAL14s were also bodied by several other manufacturers, including Harrington (Harrington Legionnaire bodywork was adopted) and Yeates.

Some VAL14s were given bus bodywork, including 10 by Marshall of Cambridge for British European Airways, and 10 by Strachan for North Western.

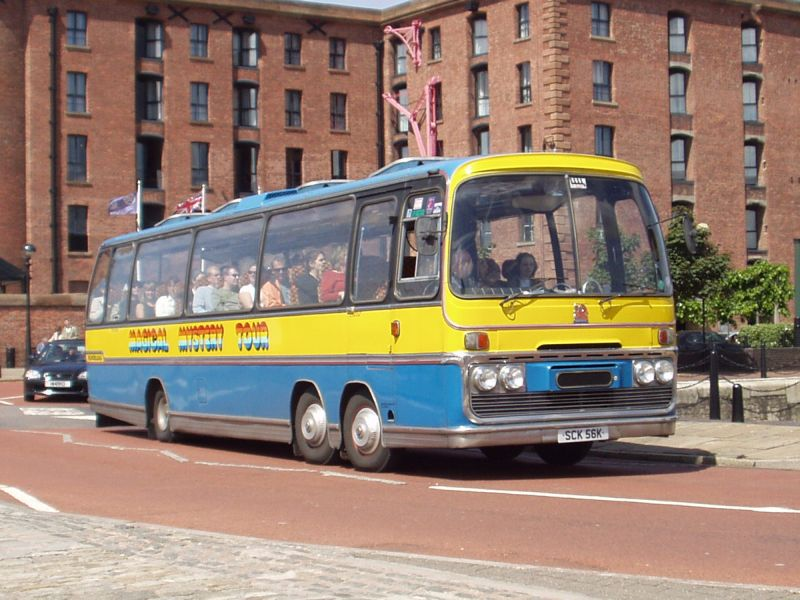
A Bedford VAL Plaxton Panorama Elite design replica used in The Beatles 1967 film Magical Mystery Tour

== In popular culture ==
The Bedford VAL gained recognition through its use in the film The Italian Job. The bodywork of this vehicle was a Harrington Legionnaire, 'ALR 453B', new in April 1964 to Batten. After modification for the film, the coach went back into coaching, and was scrapped in 1990.

A Plaxton-bodied example, 'URO 913E', featured in the 1967 Beatles film Magical Mystery Tour. This coach was new to Fox, Hayes, in 1967. In the film, the coach was raced around RAF West Malling by Ringo Starr himself against sports cars and other modes of transport, driven by other tourists. Ringo won the race with the VAL in the end.

== Bus tour of Liverpool ==
A bus tour of Liverpool, marketed as the Magical Mystery Tour, has operated since 1983. The tour visits places associated with the Beatles, such as childhood homes, Strawberry Field and Penny Lane. The tour originally used a Bedford VAL coach as in the film, but more modern vehicles are now used. A Bedford Plaxton Val, originally DOE111K, was used, previously owned by Smiths Imperial Coaches then Watsonians.
