= Plaxton =

UK builder of bus and coach bodies

Plaxton Ltd.
- Type: Subsidiary
- Industry: Transportation, manufacturing
- Founded: 1907; 119 years ago
- Headquarters: Eastfield, North Yorkshire, England, UK
- Products: Bus and coach bodies
- Owner: NFI Group
- Number of employees: 750
- Parent: Alexander Dennis
- Website: plaxtonlimited.co.uk

Plaxton is a builder of bus and coach vehicle bodies based in Eastfield, North Yorkshire, England. Founded in 1907 by Frederick William Plaxton, it became a subsidiary of Alexander Dennis in May 2007. In 2019, the maker was acquired by Canadian bus manufacturer New Flyer which then became NFI Group.

== History ==
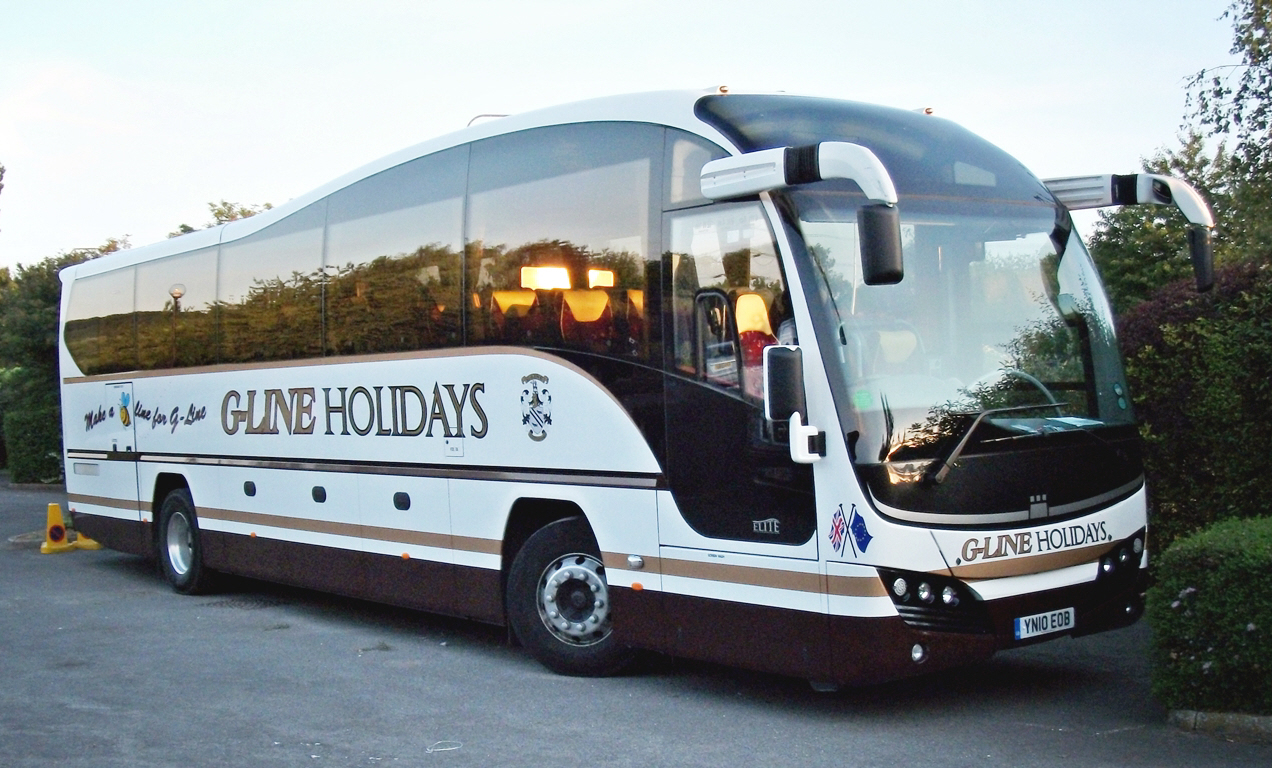
G-Line Holidays Plaxton Elite bodied Volvo B9R in June 2011

=== Beginnings ===
The business was founded as a joinery workshop, and expanded into building contracting. As a building contractor, Plaxtons built a number of notable buildings in Scarborough. Soon after World War I Plaxtons diversified and began to build charabanc bodies on Ford Model T chassis. Of more importance at the time was the construction of automobile bodywork. This included bodywork for Rolls-Royce, Sunbeam and Daimler, but principally for Crossley car chassis. This activity continued through the 1920s, but the depression of 1929–1933 created difficulties for manufacture of luxury automobiles. As a result, the manufacture of charabanc, and later coach bodies became more important through the late 1920s and early 1930s. Customers during this time tended to be local to the Scarborough area, Scarborough being a popular seaside resort.

=== Coaches of the 1930s ===
By 1936 the company felt justified in constructing a large new manufacturing facility in Seamer Road, Scarborough. This allowed increased production, and Plaxtons became popular with many independent operators throughout Northern England. Many of these operators purchased their vehicles through independent dealers, rather than directly from the factory. In this regard, Plaxton's sales were through Lancashire Motor Traders Ltd of Manchester and Arlington Motor Co Ltd of London. The company became known as FW Plaxton & Son by 1937, as the founder's son, also named Frederick William joined the company at the age of 18. FW Plaxton junior was to be known as Eric to avoid confusion with his father.

Plaxtons built a number of different coach designs through the 1930s, until settling on a distinctive house style. The style typically consisted of a very rounded front profile at the windscreen area with side windows that sloped backwards at the front, were upright at the centre, and sloped forward at the back. Bodywork for the Bedford WTB chassis was particularly distinctive, sloping steeply from the bottom of the front wheel arch to the roofline, leaving the "bullnose" radiator grille protruding. The rear also sloped prominently. The WTB chassis was very popular choice for operators at that time, together with the Dodge RBF and SBF. Leyland and AEC chassis were also popular for larger coaches, notably the Leyland Tiger and AEC Regal.

On the outbreak of World War II in 1939, coach production halted and the factory was turned into a munitions factory under the control of the Ministry of Aircraft Production. Many records from the early years were lost when an incendiary bomb set fire to the Seamer Road factory in 1943, causing much damage. As the factory was under control of the Ministry of Works, production continued in the open air whilst a replacement was constructed. Some adjacent land was loaned by a market gardener who subsequently joined the board years later.

=== 1950s ===
Production restarted at the end of 1945, and in 1951 the business was registered for the first time as a private company, Plaxtons (Scarborough) Limited.

Two new models were exhibited at the 1950 Commercial Motor Show, with names instead of model codes for the first time. The Envoy was for traditional front-engined chassis, and featured a full-front cab with a vee-pattern windscreen, and aluminium trim across the lower part of the radiator grille extending around squared-off front corners to the wheel arches. The Crusader, which could be built on the traditional front-engined chassis or the new underfloor-engined chassis, had a more upright front profile, with curved glass panels at the windscreen corners, and in most cases an enlarged side window with sloping pillars between this and the entrance. With the front-engined chassis, the Crusader employed the Envoy's front trim. Both the Envoy and Crusader were produced to the new maximum dimensions of 30 ft (9.1 m) by 8 ft (2.4 m), and many examples were originally fitted with rear wheel spats.

The Envoy was short-lived, perhaps partly because of the obsolescence of most of the chassis types for which it was intended, while the Crusader was rapidly overtaken by a further new underfloor-engined model – the Venturer. The Venturer combined the front of the Crusader with more restrained and conservative styling, and proved so popular that it was not long before a version was produced for front-engined chassis (mostly lightweight Bedfords and Commers) with a rather more raked frontal appearance. By the time the Mark II version appeared at the 1952 show, the Venturer was Plaxton's standard model.

The Venturer II had a common front profile for all models, together with a standard dash panel featuring a four-part radiator grille with a central cross within an oval outline which also embraced the headlamps. A rear-end revision marked the launch of the Venturer III in 1954, and the following year a version was produced for underfloor-engined chassis with the entrance ahead of the front axle. This required a return to a more vertical front profile, and meant that there were now three variants of the Venturer – front engined, underfloor-engined with a centre entrance and underfloor-engined with a front entrance. This three-variant approach, established with the Venturer, continued throughout the life of the succeeding Consort model and into the Embassy era, although the relative importance of the three versions varied significantly over the years.

The Consort was first shown at the 1956 Commercial Motor Show. It was a development of the Venturer, but in place of the previous oval the four-part grille was now enclosed by a near-trapezoidal outline (though actually hexagonal), wider at the top than the bottom, with the headlamps outside. Trim was revised to be much squarer in outline, featuring ribbed brightwork, and the curved rear quarter lights, first standardised on the Venturer III, were now incorporated into the main window line. However, a year later the Consort II was announced, re-introducing the oval grille outline of the Venturer – but now surrounding a plainer grille with chrome flash across the middle – while the trim lines so recently squared up were softened once again. The evident popularity of the oval- shaped grille then ensured its survival as a Plaxton hallmark for many years to come.

In 1957 the founder of the company, FW Plaxton Senior, died, and was succeeded as chairman by his son Frederick Junior, though known as Eric.

In 1958, Plaxtons were approached by Sheffield United Tours (SUT) with a requirement for a new crisper design of coach body. The result was the first Panorama body. The main feature of the Panorama design was the large, fixed rectangular side windows. A vertical front from the contemporary Consort II design was used, with the door ahead of the front axle. The 1958 Panorama was entered into the British and the Nice coach rallies, winning top awards at both events. The first six Panoramas, designated "Panorama Pioneer" by SUT, were built on AEC Reliance chassis and seated 36 passengers.

The production version of the Panorama, with 41 seats as standard, was introduced at the 1958 Commercial Motor Show, as an addition to the existing range, available in one form only – on underfloor-engined chassis with the entrance ahead of the front axle. In common with the new Consort III and IV, it had a new silver-effect dished oval grille with a chrome flash through the middle, and a curved windscreen with a central division. The original Panorama's short window immediately behind the entrance door was removed and encapsulated into the first bay, and the difference in level between the waistline and the rear window was accommodated by a "kick-up" at the rear. The design then received minor modifications over the next two years.

Consort IV variants with the entrance further back, together with the smaller Consort III, were able to use a windscreen with even greater curvature, but it was the Panorama which was the trend-setter, becoming a strong influence on the development of British coach styling for years to come.

=== 1960s and 1970s ===
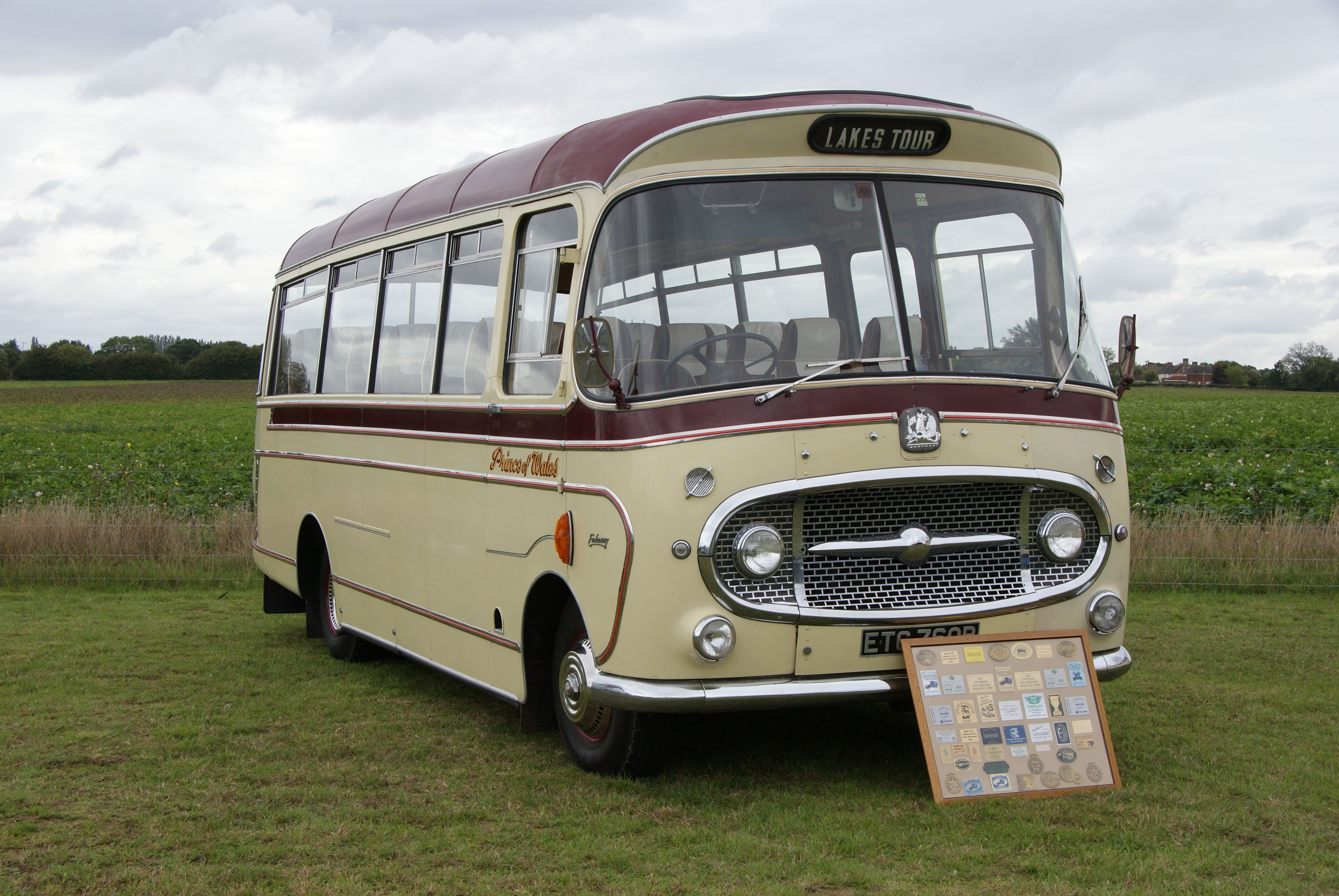
Preserved Embassy bodied Bedford VAS in August 2010

Plaxton became a public company in January 1961.

For the 1961 coaching season the Consort IV evolved into the Embassy, the main change being that the windows now tapered inwards towards the roof rather than being vertical. At the same time a new version of the Panorama was created, using the same shell as the Embassy but with fewer window pillars.

The new Panorama boasted a completely new front, featuring a slight peak overhang above the windscreen (which was now optionally undivided), a small grille at the bottom of the front panel, and for the first time double headlights. Embassy bodies on underfloor-engined chassis shared some or all of these features, depending on the entrance position. However, because the standard offering in the underfloor-engined sector was now the Panorama, most Embassy bodies were built on lightweight front-engined chassis – particularly the Thames 570E and Bedford SB. In this form, with the entrance behind the front axle, the Embassy retained the dished oval grille and wrap-around windscreen of the Consort IV. The rear of both Panorama and Embassy comprised a two-piece curved glass window that wrapped around to meet the rearmost side pillars, and the lights were contained in a single unit with a fin-like top rather like the rear of the Ford Anglia 105E saloon.

36-foot (11 m) versions of both models were introduced, on Leyland Leopard and AEC Reliance chassis, as soon as legislation allowed, and were 8 feet 2.5 inches (2.502 m) wide. The first 36-foot coach in Britain was a Panorama delivered to SUT in 1961. However, while the extra length gave a real boost to the Panorama's appearance – with the falling roofline making the vehicle look even longer than it actually was – the extension of the Embassy by two additional window bays was less satisfactory. So much so that when a "multi-windowed" Embassy II, in the livery of Bloomfields Coaches of London, appeared on the newly introduced Bedford VAL 36-foot chassis at the 1962 Commercial Motor Show, the reaction was so negative that no more of this type were built.

Alongside the Bloomfields VAL on the Plaxton stand was a further revised Panorama. This was an altogether much larger looking vehicle than before, with deeper windows all round, the waistline curvature radically reduced to a point where it was almost straight, a new rear window interchangeable with the windscreen, and a reduction in the number of window pillars on 36-foot versions. Because of the adverse reaction to the "multi-windowed" Embassy, from 1963 all 36-foot Plaxton coach bodies used the new Panorama shell, with windows of large size whether fixed or opening, although, as previously, the Panorama name was restricted to underfloor-engined coaches with fixed glazing and entrance ahead of the front axle. Of the non-Panoramas, by far the most popular model was the new production body on the Bedford VAL chassis, which retained the large oval grille because of the front-mounted radiator, and was simply named Val.

The Embassy name was now being used for what were effectively two separate models. For underfloor-engined chassis there was a 36-foot body using the Panorama shell (built mainly for the Wallace Arnold Group), and for 30-foot (9.1 m) and shorter front-engined chassis the original short-windowed body was updated with a pronounced reverse-rake peak over the windscreen as the Embassy II. For the 1964 season the latter was substantially redesigned as the Embassy III, catching up in several respects with the development of the Panorama, but introducing a new near-rectangular grille which signalled the beginning of the end for the familiar Plaxton oval.

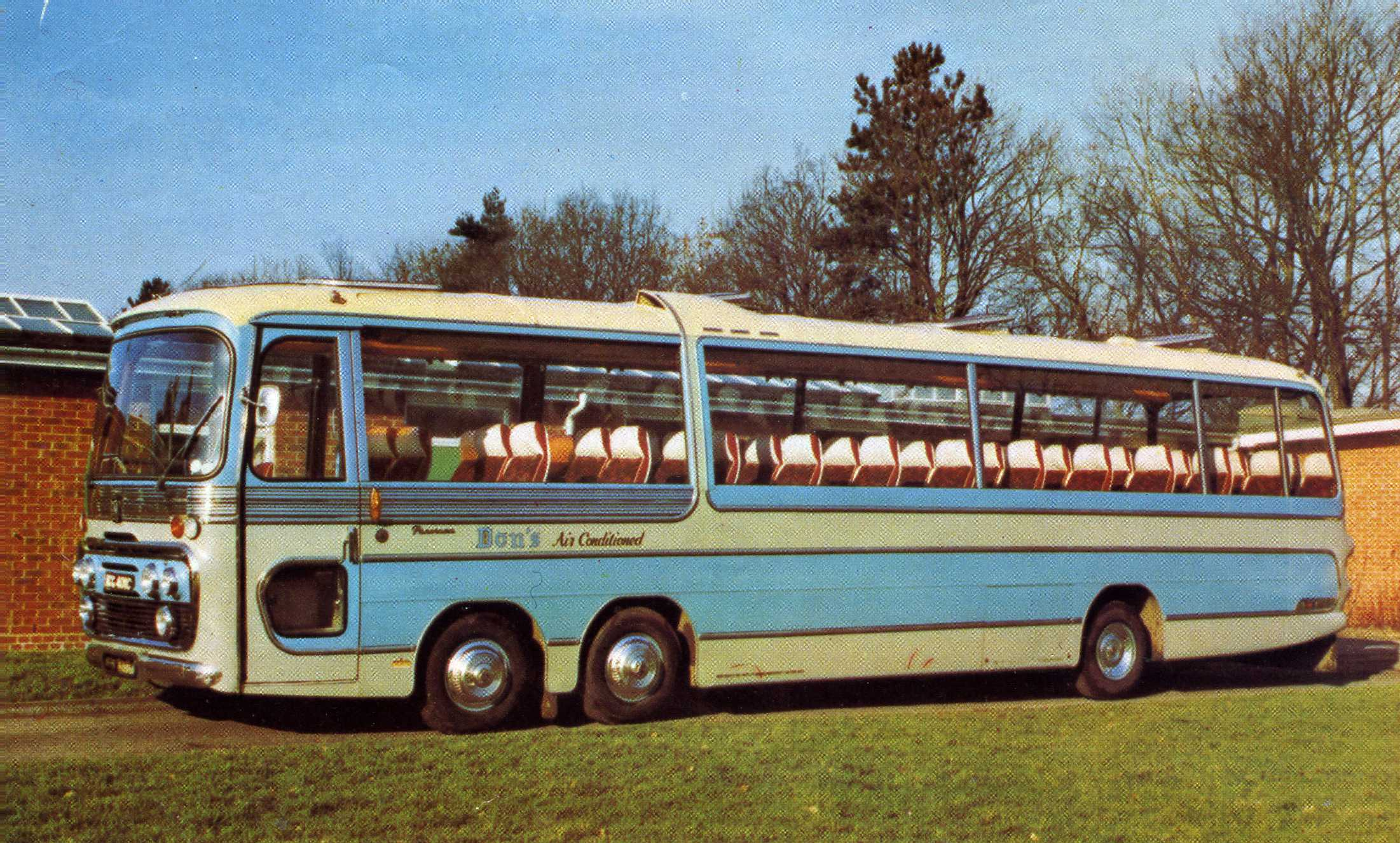
1965 Plaxton Panorama on a Bedford VAL chassis

The Plaxton coach range which appeared at the 1964 Commercial Motor Show had been extensively revised with assistance from the Ogle design consultancy. Waistrails were virtually straight, and rooflines distinctly shallower. On the new Panorama (later to become Panorama I), a wide chrome trim band wrapped around the front and encompassed the first window bay on either side. The trim then swept upwards to the roof line and neatly terminated on the air scoop at the roof line. The window pillar on the first bay was noticeably thicker than the others and gave the impression of size that managed to enhance the appearance of the whole vehicle. The front grille was revised and basically split in two horizontally. Twin headlights were on each side of a panel that contained ventilation louvres at the top with the lower part being the actual grille that spanned the width of the vehicle. This grille was to become standard with little change until the Supreme IV of 1978. Again a bit of a Plaxton that was instantly recognisable and a familiar sight throughout Britain. The rear featured two large 9" circular rear lights each side arranged vertically, and the entrance door was now the forward in-swinging type.

For the first time the Panorama was offered on all chassis types, including Ford R226 and Bedford VAL, looking particularly well-suited to the latter, where the chrome trim on the first window bay harmonised with the twin steering axles below. There was even a Panorama for the Bedford SB and Ford Thames 570E, although here the thickened window pillar was absent, and the chrome trim did not extend across the front of the vehicle.

In addition to the Panoramas, a more basic series of models was offered, with windows of similar size, but with simpler trim and top sliding vent windows instead of forced air vents. Initially these were built on Bedford and Ford chassis only and named variously as Val, Vam (on the new Bedford VAM chassis) or Embassy IV. However, when the Panorama was renamed Panorama I for the 1967 season, the less expensive "bread and butter" models became available on all chassis types as the Panorama II. The Panorama I in particular sold extremely well.

The Panorama cab was used in 1967 on a government commission of seven Bedford SB3 chassis mobile cinema units. With the height of these units being nearly 13 ft (4.0 m) the roof of the cab opens up into a very unusual looking perspex dome extension, somewhat altering the usual sleek lines of Plaxton's Panorama. One of the seven units still remains in preservation, having been restored as a vintage mobile cinema.

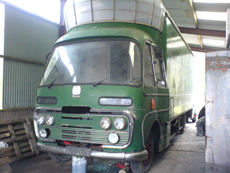
Plaxton Panorama cab on a Bedford SB3 chassis mobile cinema unit

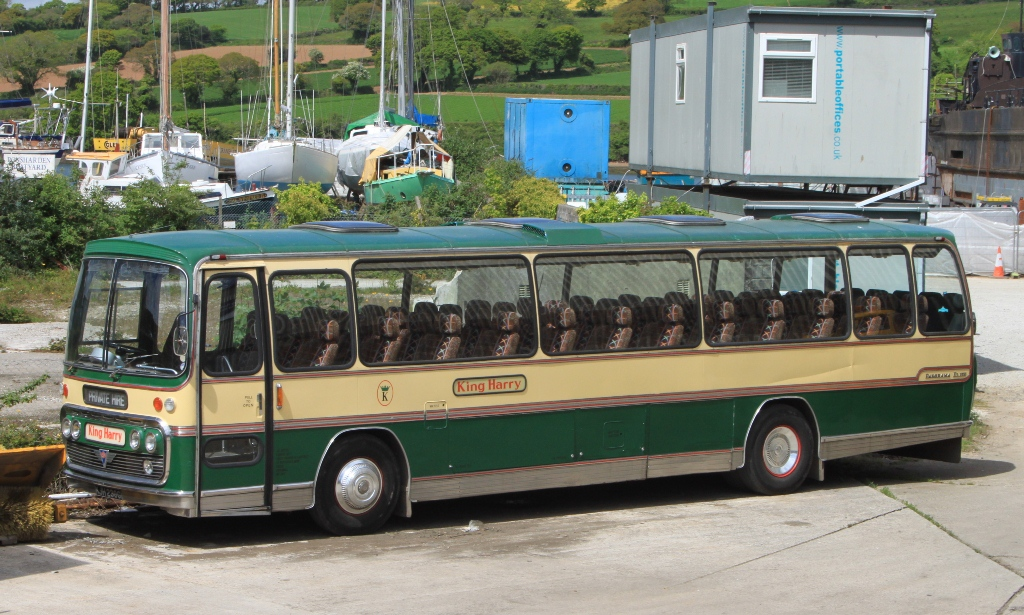
Preserved Plaxton Panorama Elite bodied AEC Reliance in June 2013

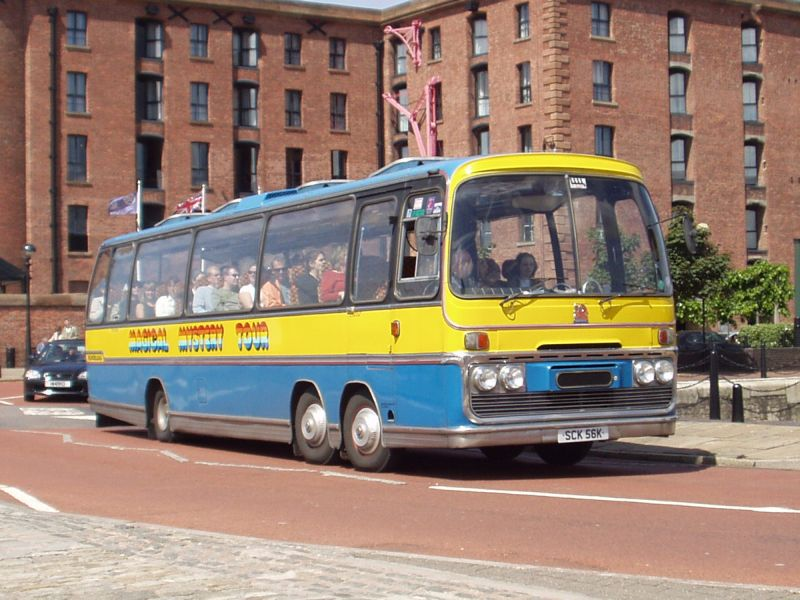
Magical Mystery Tour Plaxton Panorama Elite II bodied Bedford VAL in Liverpool in 2004

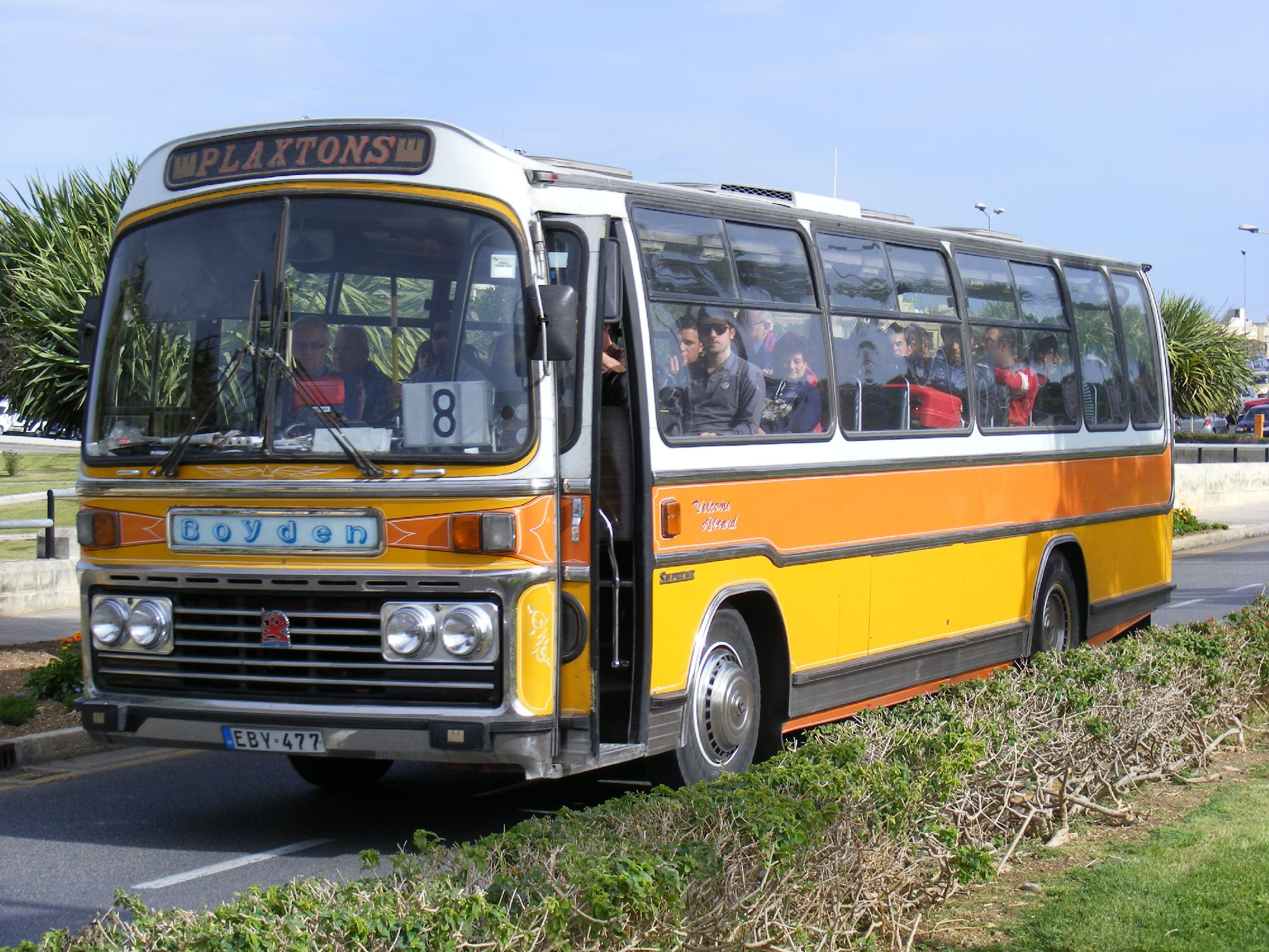
Malta bus Plaxton Supreme bodied Bedford in March 2010

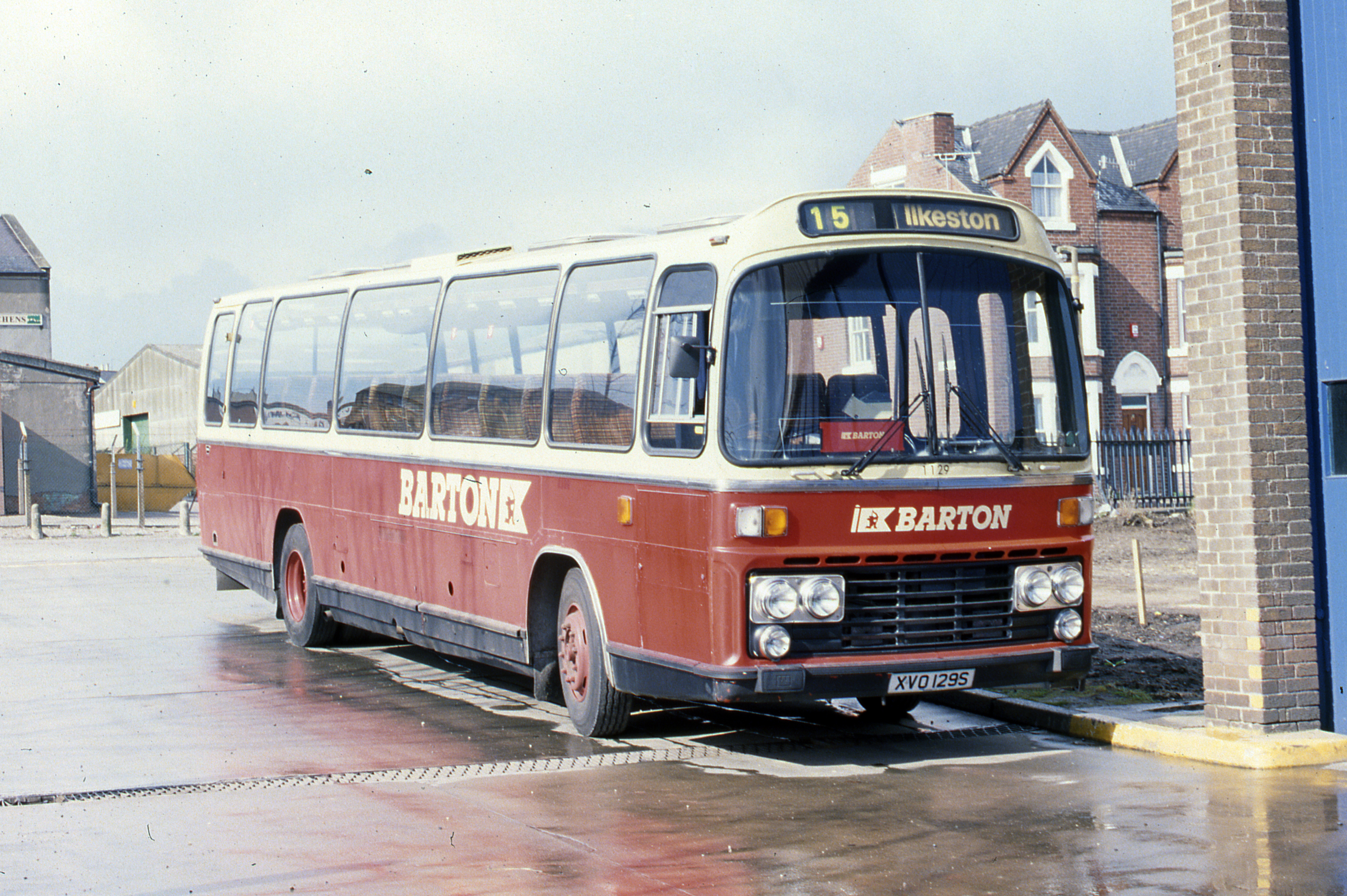
Barton Transport Plaxton Supreme III bodied Leyland Leopard in Ilkeston in 1993

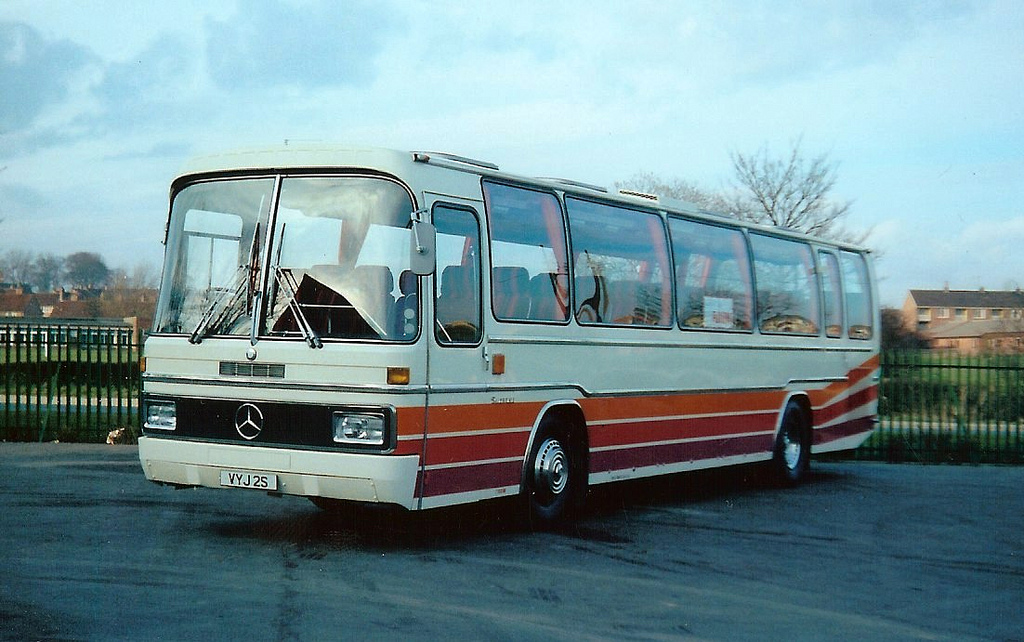
Plaxton Supreme IV bodied Mercedes-Benz O303 in 1978

Plaxton launched a new design – the Panorama Elite – at the 1968 Commercial Motor Show in London. This essentially set the basic design of British coaches for the next 14 years. The design featured long sleek lines and gentle curve in the vertical plane. The windows were gasket glazed and the glass gently curved in the vertical plane to suit the body curve. The rear again used the large soup plate lights of the Panorama I, and the front grille was also from the Panorama I.

The Panorama II was still available until 1970 with a large batch built for Midland Red.

The interior of the new Panorama Elite made more use of laminate than before. The interior skirt panels, racks and front cabinet made extensive use of this easily worked & easy to maintain material. The analogue clock in the front dome was flanked either side by small square controllable air vents. The dashboard was improved and made use of a panel of rocker switches in front of the driver with each switch designation lighting for night time operation. Previous dashboards hid the switches in places inaccessible whilst moving. Ventilation was again improved though using the same design of moulded air output & light assembly as the final version of the Panorama I. The racks were trimmed with laminate instead of using vinyl like material from the previous design.

The first major update of the Panorama Elite was unveiled at the 1970 Commercial Motor Show in London, with relatively subtle changes.

The Panorama Elite II range built on the success of the Panorama I and Panorama Elite. The front grille was squared up although it still used the same twin headlight layout. The first bay on the near side was tidied up so the top of the window was in line with all the other side windows. Parcel racks were redesigned so the supply of fresh air and light output was more readily available. The service units were now mounted front to back instead of side to side and were much slimmer to maximise on headroom when leaving the seats. Crash padding was provided along the inner side of the racks in the form of black PVC squares filled with padding. The dashboard was again improved as was the front cabinet. The rear of the vehicle still used the soup plates from the previous range.

The Panorama Elite III was the last in the Elite series. Improvements continued to the basic Elite design; this included rear lighting, rear emergency door and subtle changes to the front grille. The rear emergency door was brought about by changes in legislation and did improve the offside appearance of the Elite, however some early Mark IIIs were completed with front emergency doors. The rear lights abandoned the soup plates in favour of tall lozenge shaped lights and the name badges were re-located from between the side bright metal strips at the back to the front just behind the front door.

All three marks of the Elite range were available with bus grant specification front doors and interiors, although this option was late for Panorama Elite and only a few built. It was however a very popular option for the Mark II and Mark III. To complement this destination blinds were also available in both the front grille and on the roof or front dome for front radiator chassis. This became known as "the Bristol Dome" due to the popularity of orders from the National Bus Company for coaches on Bristol RELH and REMH chassis.

The major competitor for the Panorama Elite III was the Duple Dominant launched at the 1972 Commercial Motor Show in London. The Duple was of all steel design and built at Duple's Blackpool factory. The Dominant had many of the design cues of the Panorama Elite and that could be because the managing director at that time was an ex Plaxton employee. The Dominant sold well but never caught up with the Elite. The mere fact that at the 1972 Commercial Motor Show only one Dominant was available due to a long strike at the Blackpool factory couldn't have helped much. The launch of the Dominant was at Lake Garda in Italy and was Duple's most important launch for years.

By the time the final version of the Panorama Elite III was built around 6,000 of the Elite series bodies had been produced.

Development of a new coach range to supersede the Panorama Elite commenced in 1974 and was to be called Panorama Supreme, however the Panorama part was dropped in favour of simple Supreme. This series of bodies was to have a long development process as both the factory and work force wasn't equipped for all-steel production at this stage.

At first the Supreme was designed to replace the ageing Panorama IV that was produced on the Bedford VAS and SB chassis for up to 41 passengers. The design for that coach went back to the Embassy body developed in the early 1960s. It had been re-vamped in the early 1970s and given an upright front and rear like the Elite III. Being front engined it had a centre door and still retained the Panorama I–style square cornered flat glass windows.

The Supreme was to herald (nearly) all-steel construction. Wood fillets still held the panels in place and in some areas wood was sandwiched in U-shaped steel. It would be 1978 before true all-steel construction was achieved.

Some early Mark III Supremes were all-metal. The body number of the all-metal versions had the final letters AM standing for "all-metal". Many of the AM bodies were exported to the Netherlands and Denmark, a fact supported by the 1977 Supreme brochure and the 1982 centenary book Plaxtons The Great British Coachbuilders.

There was to be six marks of Supreme (Seven including Mini Supreme). Development was protracted as the builder was careful not to compromise their market leading position. Supreme I was a 29-seat coach on a Bedford VAS chassis with a standard Plaxton in-swing door located behind the front axle. Supreme II was on the 35 seat Bristol LHS chassis powered by a Leyland 400 series engine. The door located forward of the front axle in the usual place. Supreme III was the first full size coach although there seemed to be some development confusion and the actual mark of the initial standard length coaches is not clear however most of the late P and earlier R-reg bodies seemed to be the Mark III. There were no identifying numbers added to the badging.

As styling development commenced it was realised that to design another coach to match the success of the Panorama Elite series was to be a challenge. Looking at the existing range of Panorama Elite III it was decided to use the Elite's most striking feature, notably the size of the windows and the curves that departed in every direction. The front of the coach was to follow closely with Elite by using the same double headlights with a panel between them (although the centre panel depended on the chassis requirements). The slats again horizontal but were fewer in number and thicker. The sides of the grille were squared up and were of stainless steel and not aluminium. A chrome bumper with 5 mph (8.0 km/h) over-riders at the bottom with two steps to allow access to the windscreen. Pantograph wipers with speed control were added. The dome was slatted on the early models but was not popular so was removed and simplified from Supreme IV. The side profile again had angles going in all directions although the main change to the side was that the windows curved into the cant rail almost like the Mercedes-Benz O302 bodies. The effect was to catch the light and highlighted the whole coach at roof level. The rear was like Panorama Elite with vertical lozenge shaped lights but the units themselves were slightly bigger, squared, more definite.

The interior had been updated with a new dashboard and a driver's locker, non-reflective laminates and a re-designed front cabinet. The lift up roof vents and light clusters containing the speakers were almost like those of the final Panorama Elite III. Some very early Supremes had wood interior domes like Panorama Elite however this was changed from wood surrounding the clock to having ABS mouldings in black. The ceiling was of laminate that was bordered by chrome trim.

The racks though went through several important stages before the final design that would see Supreme through to the series.

Rack design on Panorama Elite, II and III contained window demisters. Those racks were joined to the cant rail and laminate was used as trim to connect the window edge to the rack. On Supreme the first versions used the same technique but the racks were swaddled in crash protection on each side of the passenger service unit that was fitted front to back. The service unit used were the same as the Panorama Elite, two controllable vents and a reading light with a rocker switch. The cushioning had a four pointed star engraved into it at intervals. From the Mark III the racks had flatter sides that had no connection to the cant rail. The demisters were located on the edge of the rack within a laminate strip. The PVC or maybe ABS material that coated the underneath of the rack was usually black. This was the final design of rack and saw Supreme through to the end of the series. Those racks used flatter service units with eyeball vents and a flat lens on the reading light.

The Supreme Mark IV was introduced to the market at the International Motor Show at the National Exhibition Centre, Birmingham in 1978. The main update was that construction was now all steel, frontal design was completely different from the past 14 years. The headlights were now rectangular and mounted above each other with side lights and indicators in the same cluster. The grille was not so prominent and various options were available as a package. So now the range consisted of Supreme IV, Supreme IV Express and Supreme IV GT. The GT option ushered in a distinctive grille design with a smart dual chrome flash, tinted windows and better sound system and soft trim to the ceiling to name a few "standard" extras.

Supreme V had a completely different rear design showing the styling of the next range that was probably under development. Tall heavily featured light clusters that were tinted to look dark were fitted vertically between the boot lid. The rear window was a one piece design. The seat backs were no longer visible from outside the coach. The rear nearside had been tidied by removing the smaller windows. The improvements were also copied onto the high floor Viewmaster model with the exception of the shallow rear window.

The Supreme was also manufactured as a semi-integral on a DAF chassis. Around 20 were built. They were rear engined and the rear panel design was different from the Supreme V as it has vents and had odd shaped moulding around the rear window. As a semi-integral the body was required to support the full weight as there were no chassis members to support the body. Opening the side lockers luggage could be piled in one side and extracted from the other as nothing was in the way so it was very cutting-edge technology. It is said that 2 of these survive today. The bulk of the 20 were exported, mainly to the Netherlands, the left hand drive version had a tapered front to meet Dutch swept turning-circle requirements.

Final Supreme offering was the Supreme VI. This model was the least successful Supreme being an option for one season alongside the Supreme V. The panoramic windows had been replaced by a higher window line that was better suited to the long-distance market. Around 100 were built. The actual idea of the high window design was possibly in reaction to the Duple Dominant III that had shallow trapezoidal windows like an Austin Princess headlight of the mid-1970s.

The Supreme series like the Panorama I and Panorama Elite were simply a success from the outset winning many orders from small, national, and some international operators. It entered most fleets in large multiples. The export market was addressed with left hand drive versions, some modified for the Dutch market and at least one was built on Deutz chassis. The dynamic approach of Plaxtons relationship with their customers requirements was a huge factor in the success of the Supreme.

=== The Paramount era ===
Plaxton Paramount I bodied DAF MB200 in Chester in July 2007

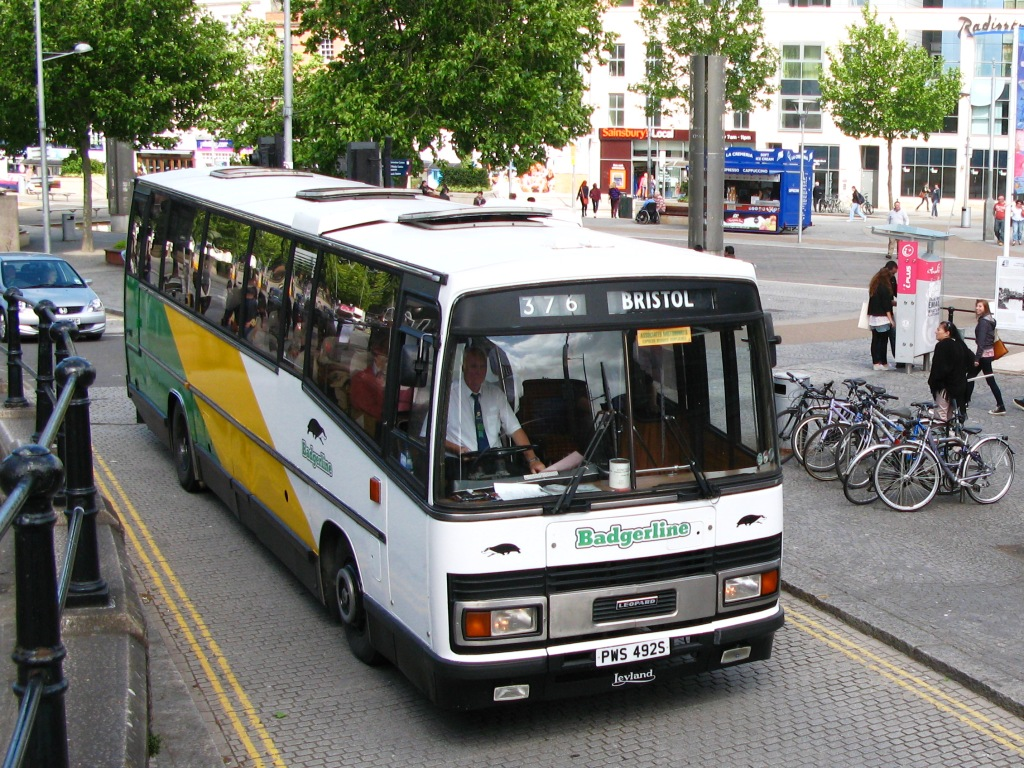
Preserved Badgerline Plaxton Paramount I bodied Leyland Leopard in May 2011

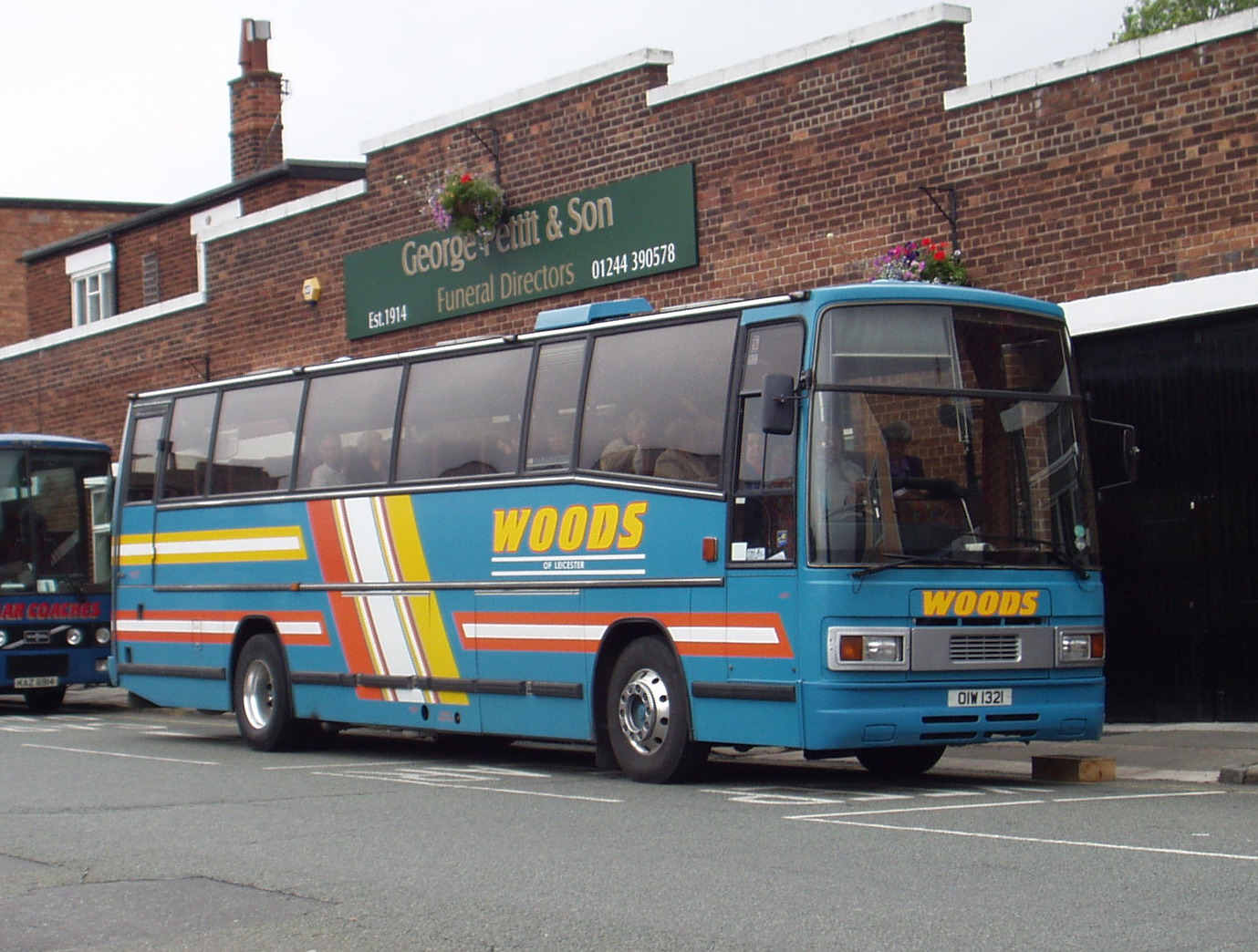
Woods of Leicester Plaxton Paramount II bodied Volvo B10M in Chester

By the end of the 1970s, the British coach scene was dominated by two similar vehicles – the Plaxton Supreme and the Duple Dominant. In the early 1980s coach services over 30 miles were deregulated by the Transport Act 1980 and there was an increasing attempt by some operators to compete with the railways and airlines for express and intercity travel. As a result, there was a move away from light-weight chassis by Bedford and Ford to heavier-duty chassis from Leyland and Volvo, and an emphasis on improved comfort and amenities. There was also a growing interest from operators in imports from Europe. In particular, designs from Neoplan and Van Hool received much attention.

In response, Plaxton returned to Ogle Design to create a new look for their coach products. The result was the Plaxton Paramount, which appeared at the 1982 British Motor Show. The Paramount was a squarer design than the Supreme, with cleaner lines, a flatter roof line and a distinctive "feature window" just behind the front wheelarch. The use of the "feature window" was a return to a trump card played by the Ogle-inspired Panorama/Panorama I first seen in 1964. From there the waistline sloped down to meet the deeper windscreen. Initially there were two versions, the Paramount 3200 (available in 8, 10, 11 and 12-metre lengths) and the high-floor Paramount 3500 (available in 11 and 12 metre lengths) to replace the successful Viewmaster. Around 30% of Mark I Paramounts were the 3500 high-floor option, a greater proportion than had been anticipated. The rear of both versions were similar to Supreme V and VI but all else was new.

In 1984 the design was adapted to produce the Paramount 4000 double-decker coach, initially built on Neoplan underframes. The design later appeared on chassis by Volvo, Scania and DAF.

The Paramount II launched for the 1985 season brought a tidier frontal appearance. (See the picture with the Paramount 4000) Gone was the black plastic moulding below the windscreen and the "hole" like appearance of the centre of the grille between the lights. The rectangular headlights were retained within a bright silver like surround. Other modifications included deeper parcel racks that were capable of supporting air conditioning. A tweed like material was used to cover the interior skirt and a large part of the racks.

A "low driver" option was available for the 3200. This was useful for touring however the driver lost the commanding view of the road ahead. The driver sat low in the body so the passengers have a better view ahead. The windscreen from the 3500 was used on this version of the 3200, the headlights being lower to the road than usual.

1986 saw the final version of Paramount, the Mark III. According to brochures it was even stronger than the Paramount II. The sloping front window was gone and in its place a stepped front window that formed the first bay. In the glass Plaxton's "castle" logo was etched, the rear window contained a blind like decal at the base with a castle badge in the centre. The dashboard consisted of a moulded cabinet, ceasing the use of wood and formica of earlier versions of Plaxton coaches since the Panorama's. In the centre of the black finished cabinet was a large castle logo. Airline-style locker doors were now available on the parcel racks to further give a sleek appearance like a 747.

In 1989 Plaxton responded to a request from the privatised National Express for a further version of Paramount III to be leased to its contractors by a joint venture of Plaxton, National Westminster Bank and National Express. The Paramount Expressliner was created from the Mark III Paramount on a Volvo chassis and was tailored to National Express' specific requirements which included a closed back with the double N logo etched into the fibre glass rear moulding. This period of coach design seemed to introduce the windowless rear as a design feature for most coaches.

=== Henlys and a new beginning ===
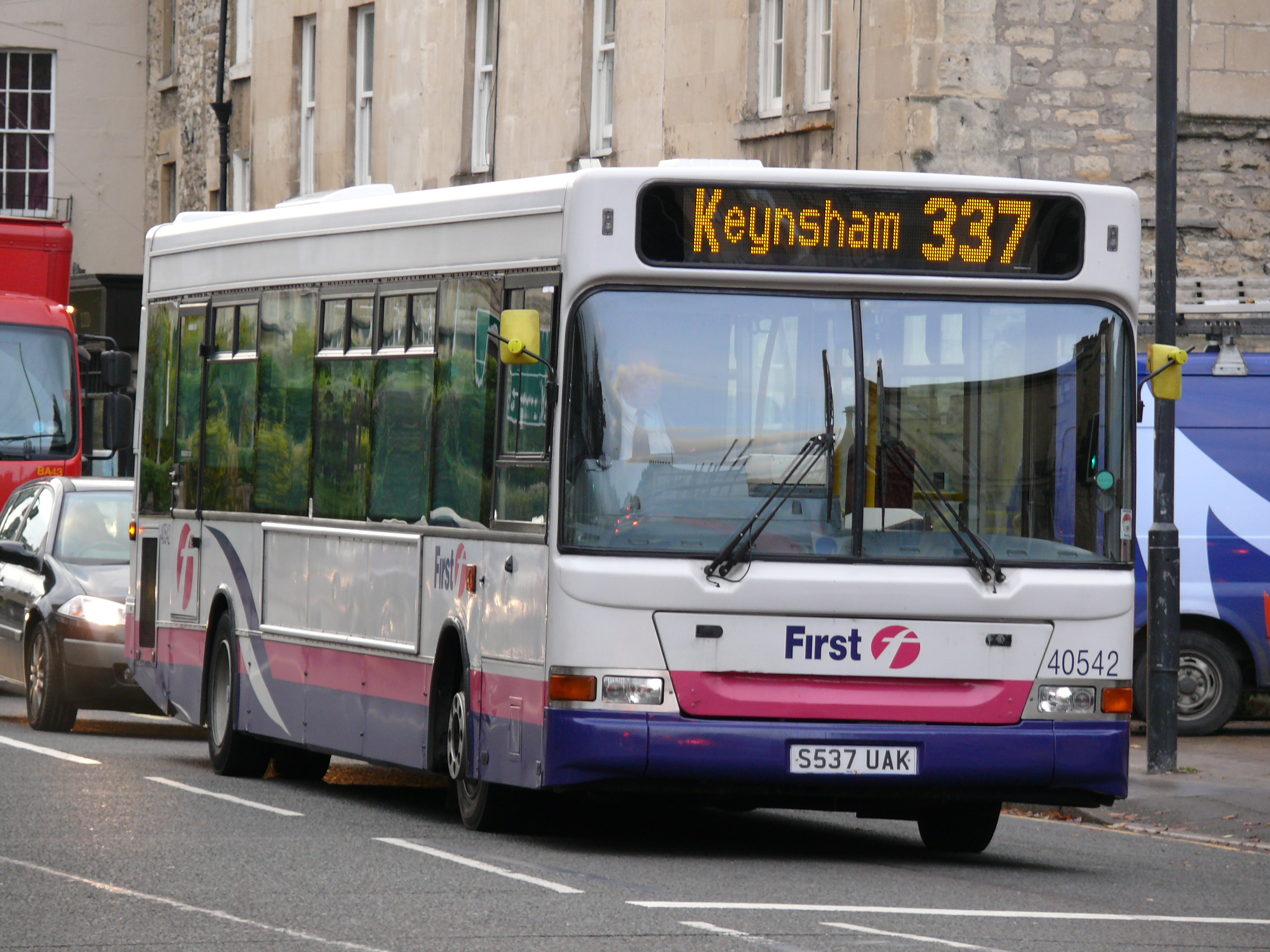
First Bristol Plaxton Pointer bodied Dennis Dart SLF in Bath in October 2010

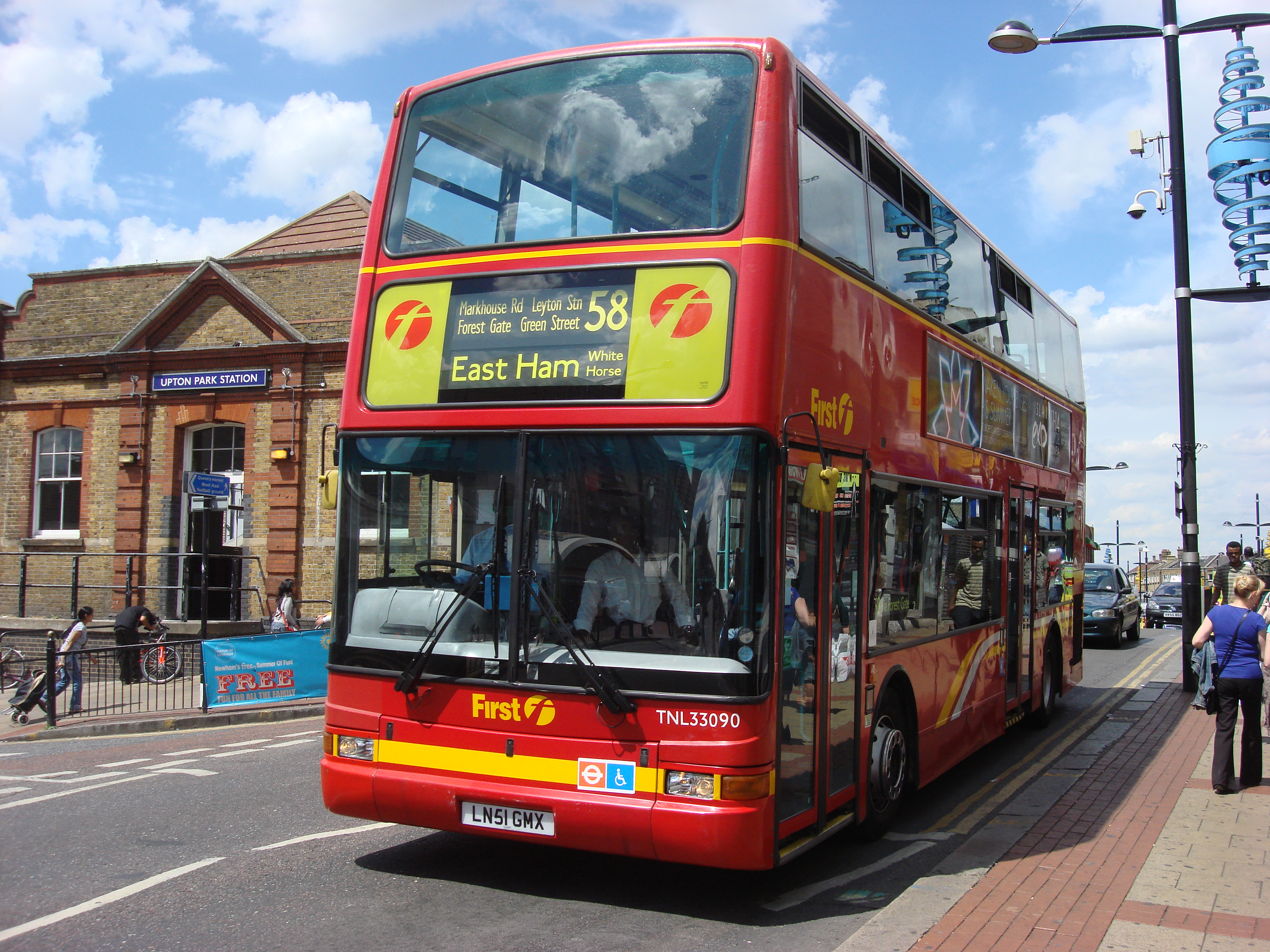
First London Plaxton President bodied Dennis Trident 2 at Upton Park station in July 2008

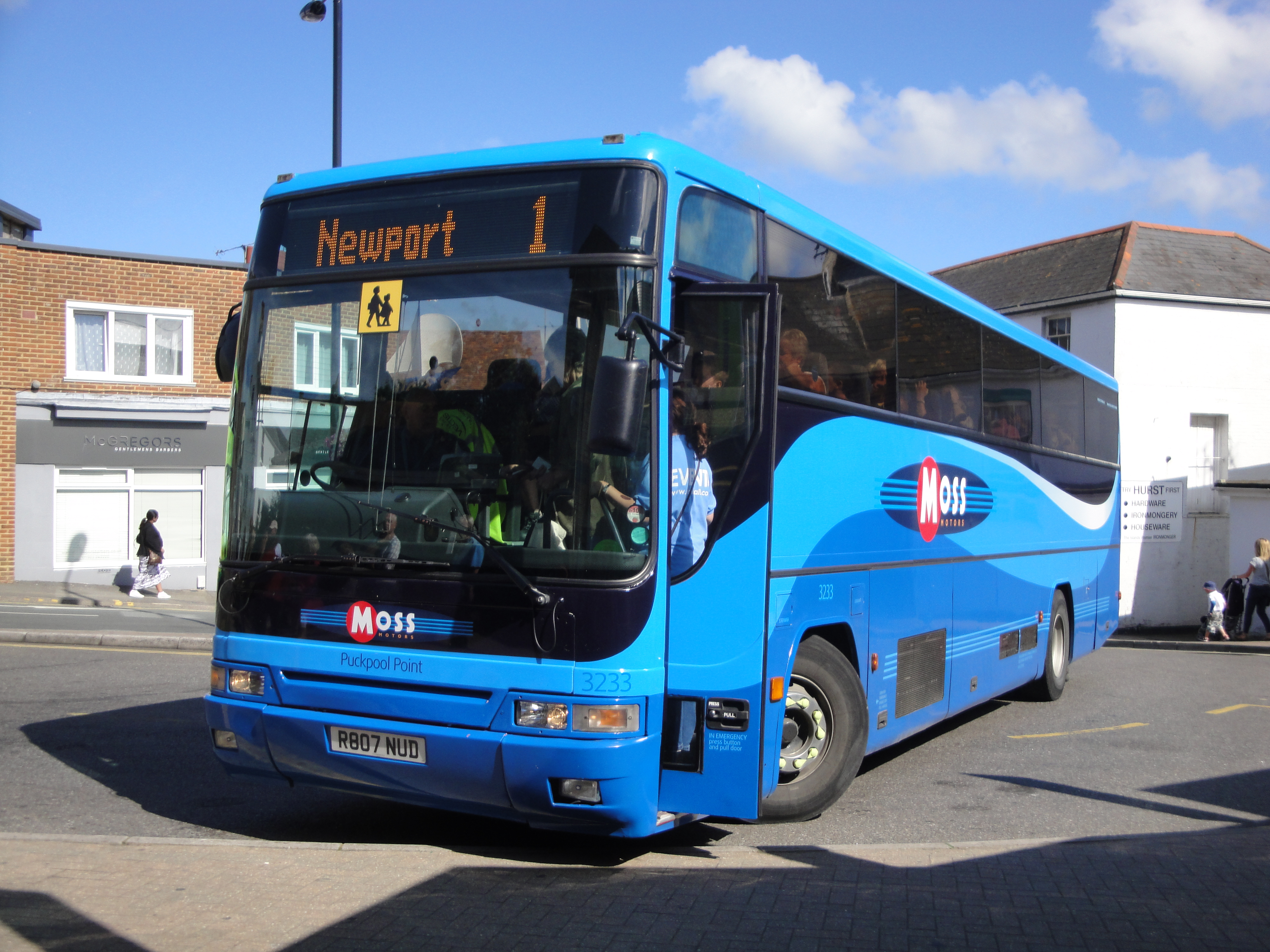
Southern Vectis Plaxton Premiere bodied Volvo B10M on the Isle of Wight in August 2011

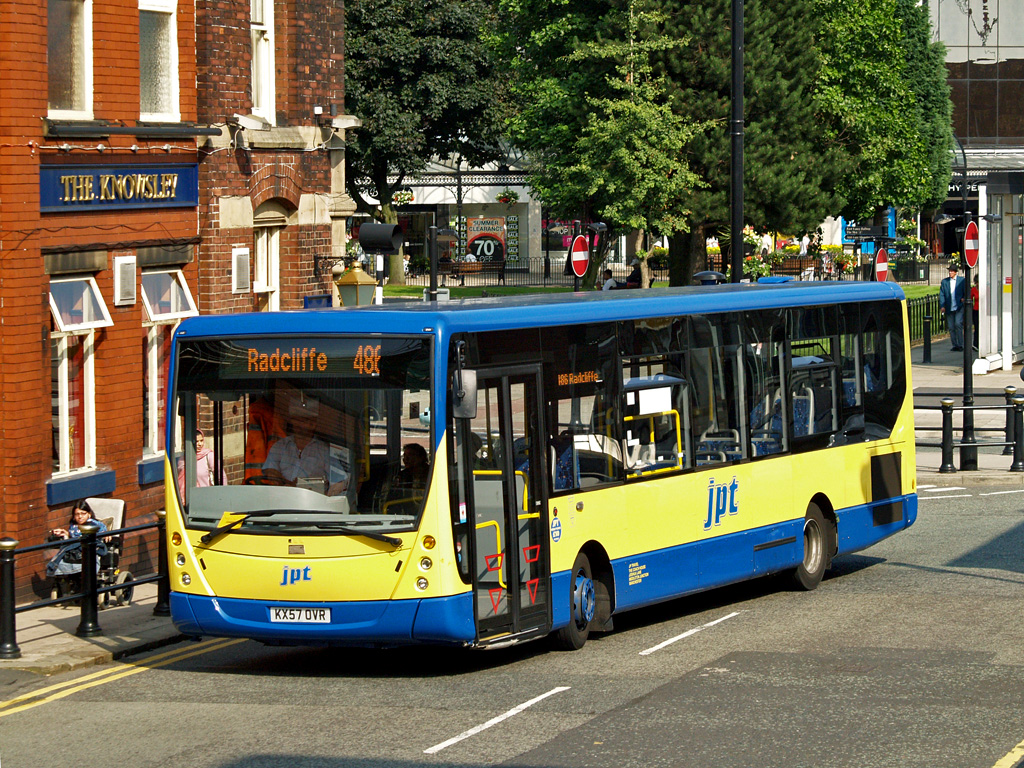
JPT Bus Company Plaxton Centro bodied MAN 18.240 in Bury in July 2008

The mid-1980s brought difficult times for Plaxton. A decline in orders due to the economic climate was compounded by management and production problems. The seasonal nature of coach production made recruiting difficult. In 1986, Plaxton bought Kirkby Bus & Coach, based in Anston, near Sheffield. Kirby were Plaxton's largest dealer, and also marketed the Hungarian Ikarus buses in the United Kingdom. Management expertise from Kirkby was soon in charge, investing in modernising the Scarborough factory and addressing some industrial relations problems.

In 1989, Plaxtons bought Henlys, a company that included 34 motor dealers and Coleman Milne, makers of hearses and limousines. The name of the company was changed to Plaxton Group plc.

In July 1989, Plaxton bought the manufacturing rights for the coach products of its main domestic competitor, Duple for £4 million. This included the jigs for the Duple 320 and the Duple 425 integral. Duple Services Ltd., the spares and repair business, was also purchased. The 320 was re-worked by Plaxtons at Scarborough later in 1989 and 25 were built and sold as the Plaxton 321. Many components from the Paramount were used both internally and externally. Identifying traits being the squared up wheel arches and Paramount side mouldings. The 321 was around £6,000 cheaper than a comparable Paramount 3200 III and was only available from the Kirkby dealership. A Plaxton version of the higher floor Duple 340 was considered but none were built. A modified version of the Duple 425 integral design was introduced in 1991 and was briefly built in France by Carrosserie Lorraine as the Plaxton 425.

Carrosserie Lorraine was a subsidiary of Iveco assembling Iveco 315 and 370 coaches for the French domestic market, but it was purchased by Plaxton in 1989 subject to a 3-year deal with Iveco to continue that arrangement. Sales of the Iveco-Lorraine had never been high (totalling only around 660 between 1981 and 1992) and Plaxton's efforts to expand the business by offering Lorraine coaches in the UK market were frustrated by the early 1990s recession. One batch of ten Iveco 315 Lorraine midicoaches was sold in the UK in 1990–92, and only twelve Plaxton 425 integrals were built at the French plant in 1991–92. The Carrosserie Lorraine factory closed in March 1992 when the three-year deal with Iveco expired.

The Dennis Dart, released in 1989, had been a runaway success, so in 1991 the Plaxton Pointer midibus was announced, this was quite a utilitarian, square body. This was followed by the Plaxton Verde, which Plaxton hoped would match the success of its smaller sister, but it failed to capture the market quite as much as the Pointer, and it was clear that the bus industry wasn't buying 12m single-deckers in as large numbers any more. Later that year new coach bodies, the Plaxton Premiere and Plaxton Excalibur, were launched.

In May 1992, after a management shake-up, the company was renamed Henlys Group.

Henlys pursued a strategy of diversification and expansion through the 1990s. The established bus bodybuilder Northern Counties was bought in 1995 for £10 million. The UK bus and coach manufacturing business, trading under the Plaxton brand, continued to produce a range of bus and coach bodywork. It also owned one of the largest UK coach dealers, Kirkby, and provided after-sales services to coach and bus operators.

In August 2000, Henlys entered a joint venture with Mayflower Corporation, owners of the Dennis and Alexander brands. The joint venture, known as TransBus International, included only the United Kingdom bus manufacturing operations of both companies, including Plaxton and Northern Counties. Henlys held a 30% stake in the joint venture, which employed 3,300 employees at seven locations. The traditional brands of Alexander, Dennis and Plaxton were replaced by TransBus International.

=== Independent again ===
On 31 March 2004, TransBus International was put into administration. On 17 May 2004, the Plaxton business was sold in a management buyout and resumed trading as Plaxton Limited.

Plaxton employed almost 300 people at its main coach plant in Scarborough and a further 59 at its facility in Anston, which builds small buses and coaches such as the Beaver and Cheetah.

In May 2005, Plaxton announced its return to the service bus market, launching the Centro, a low-floor single-deck vehicle initially to be offered on VDL SB120 chassis, in 10.7 m length, with the first bus completed in February 2006. The Centro is now available on the VDL SB180, VDL SB200, MAN 14.220 and Volvo B7RLE chassis, with 10.2 m and 12 m lengths also offered.

The company also revealed the Primo, a 28-seat low-floor minibus, in September 2005. This 7.9 m long vehicle is powered by the Cummins ISBe Euro III engine, mounted transversely at the rear. The Primo frame is assembled in Hungary by Enterprise Bus, effectively a conventional chassis in most respects but one which extends up to cantrail level, before being shipped to Scarborough for completion.

=== Purchase by Alexander Dennis ===
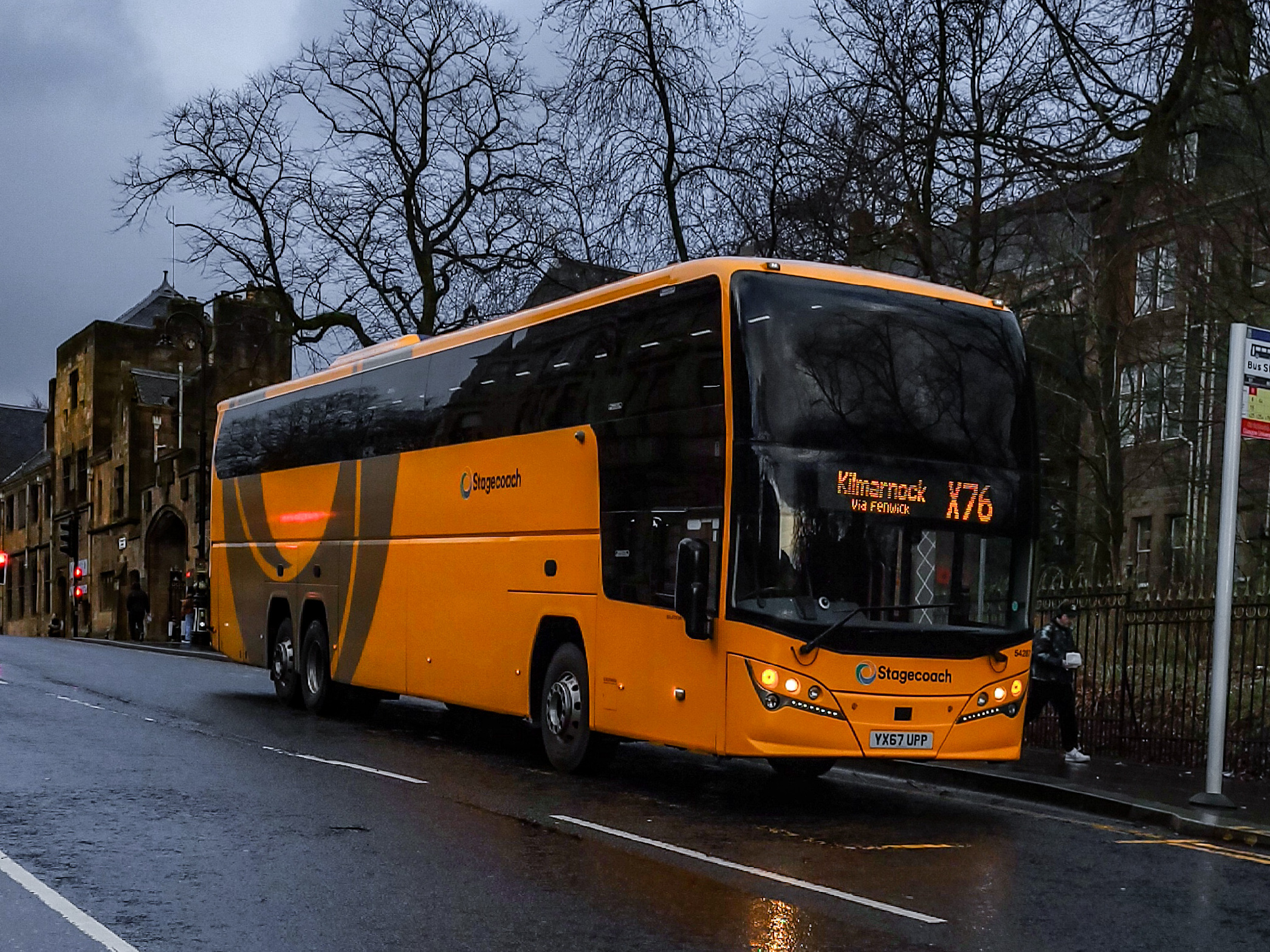
Stagecoach South Scotland Plaxton Elite i double-decker coach at Glasgow University Library in March 2026

In May 2007, Plaxton was purchased by Alexander Dennis, effectively recreating the TransBus International business. Following the purchase, Plaxton's Centro bodywork remained in production alongside Alexander Dennis's Enviro200 and Enviro300.

In 2008, the new Plaxton Elite was launched at Birmingham Euro Bus Expo and by 2011 had delivered 100 Elites. Originally based on the Volvo B12B chassis, it was later developed to suit the Volvo B9R and B13R chassis.

Alexander Dennis announced in March 2024 that as a result of the shift of the company's priorities to manufacturing battery electric buses, production of Plaxton coaches would be suspended until 2026.

== Products ==
=== Current ===
==== Coaches ====
As of 2021, the following models were being manufactured:

- Elite luxury coach
- Elite i inter-deck coach
- Leopard entry-level coach
- Panorama double-decker coach
- Panther mid-spec coach
- Panther Cub short-wheelbase coach
- Panther LE low-entry intercity service coach

==== Buses ====
Since the end of production of the Centro, Primo and Pronto, Plaxton do not currently produce any of their own-branded buses. However, the Plaxton factory at Scarborough does currently produce Enviro200 MMC and Enviro400 MMC buses for parent company Alexander Dennis.

=== Past ===
(All coach bodies unless noted)

- Type A
- D Series
- Type F (full fronted)
- Type J (half cab)
- K Series
- L Series
- M Series
- Q2
- Envoy
- Venturer I, II, III
- Crusader Mk I, Mk II
- Consort Mk I, Mk II, Mk III, Mk IV
- Highway – (single deck bus)
- Panorama
- Embassy I, II, III, IV
- Panorama I and Panorama II
- Panorama Elite, Elite Express
- Panorama Elite II, Elite Express II
- Panorama Elite III, Elite Express III
- Panorama IV (For Bedford SB and VAS)
- Derwent, Derwent II (single deck bus)
- Supreme I, II, III, IV, V, VI (1st version of Supreme for *Bristol LHS & Bedford PJK was to be known as Panorama Supreme)
- Viewmaster (Britain's first 3.5M coach)
- Bustler – (single deck bus)
- Paramount 3200, 3500, 4000, Mk I, Mk II, Mk III including low driving position option
- Plaxton Expressliner (Paramount III for National Express)
- Derwent 3000 – (single deck bus)
- Plaxton 321 (1989 version of the Duple 320 after takeover)
- Plaxton 425 (post-takeover version of the Duple 425 built by French subsidiary, Carrosserie Lorraine)
- Verde – for rear engined Dennis Lance, Volvo B10B and Scania N113 single-deck bus chassis
- Excalibur – for Volvo B10M and Volvo B12T chassis
- Premiere 320, 350 – for Volvo B10M, Scania K93, Dennis Javelin chassis amongst others
- Prima – for Volvo B7R, DAF SB3000 chassis
- Prestige – left hand drive product sold to France and Italy on Volvo B12R
- Prestige – single-deck bus based on remodelled Northern Counties design
- President – double-deck bus
- Beaver / Beaver 2 / Beaver 3 – minibus for Mercedes-Benz van chassis
- Pointer / Pointer 2 – for Dennis Dart/Dart SLF and Volvo B6/B6LE chassis
- Plaxton Concept 2000 – for Volvo B6BLE chassis
- Paragon – for Volvo B10M, B12M and B12B, Dennis R-Series, MAN 18.310 and Irisbus EuroRider
- Profile (10m and 12m) – for Volvo B7R and Dennis Javelin chassis
- Primo / Primo 2 – midibus based on the frame of Enterprise Bus Plasma
- Centro – for VDL SB120, VDL SB200, MAN 12.240, MAN 14.220 and Volvo B7RLE single-deck bus chassis
- Cheetah (8.5m) – for Mercedes-Benz Vario van chassis
- Cheetah XL for Mercedes-Benz Atego truck chassis

== See also ==
- Henlys Group
- Category:Plaxton buses
