= Bedford VAM =

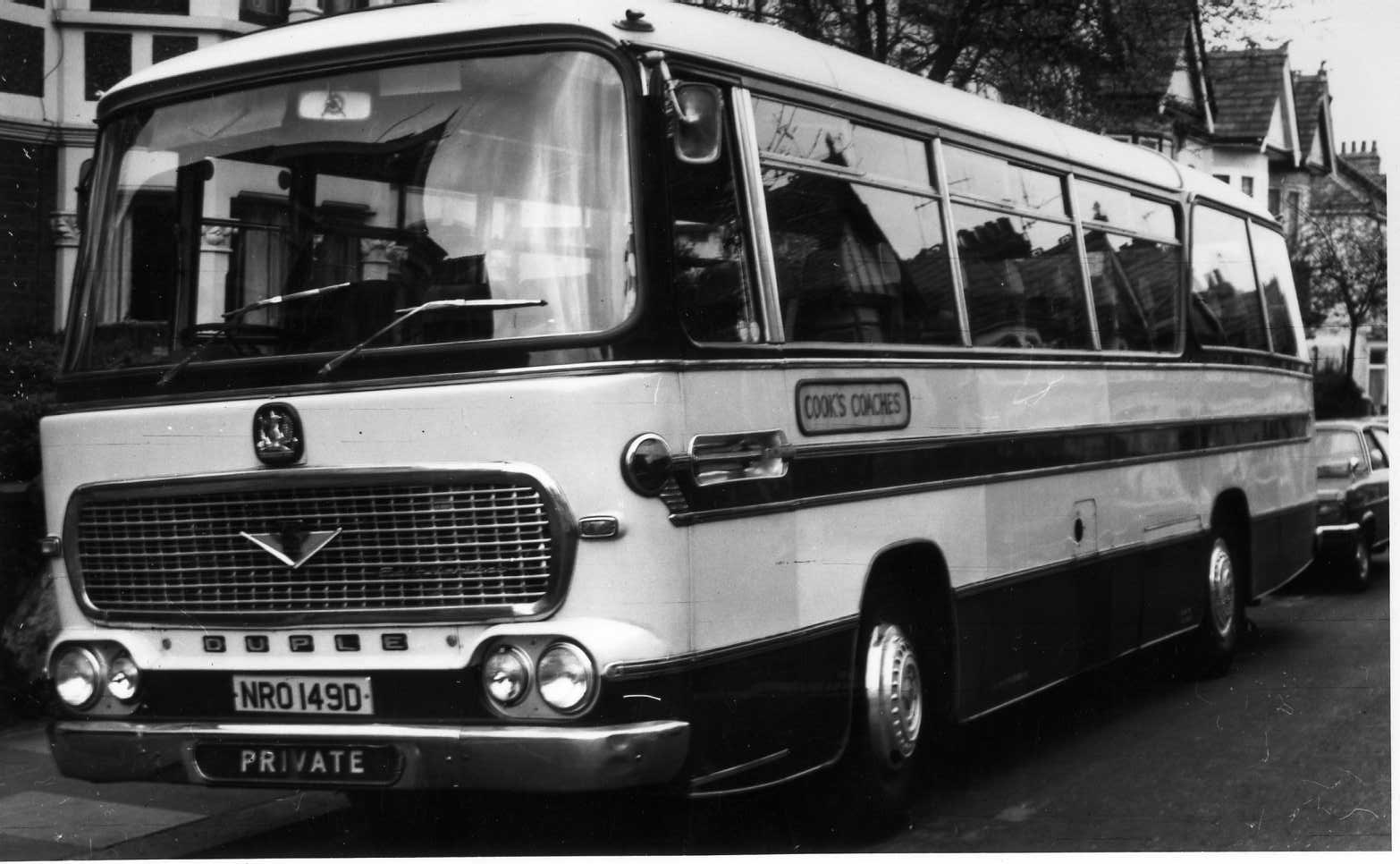
- Duple bodied Bedford VAM5 in 1975

Overview
- Manufacturer: Bedford
- Production: 1965

Body and chassis
- Doors: 1-2
- Floor type: Step entrance

Powertrain
- Engine: Bedford 300cu petrol Bedford 360cu diesel Bedford 466cu diesel Bedford 500cu diesel Leyland 0.400

Chronology
- Successor: Bedford Y series

The Bedford VAM was a bus chassis manufactured by Bedford from 1965.

== History ==
In August 1965, Bedford commenced production of a new front-entrance front-engine coach chassis.

The VAM came with a number of engine options:

- VAM3 - Bedford 300cu petrol engine
- VAM5 - Bedford 330cu diesel engine
- VAM14 - Leyland 400cu diesel engine
- VAM70 - Bedford 466cu diesel engine
- VAM75 - Bedford 500cu diesel engine, also known as BLP2

The Bedford VAM was sold extensively in the United Kingdom, as well as in export markets including Hong Kong, Australia and New Zealand.
