= Barton Transport =

British bus operating company

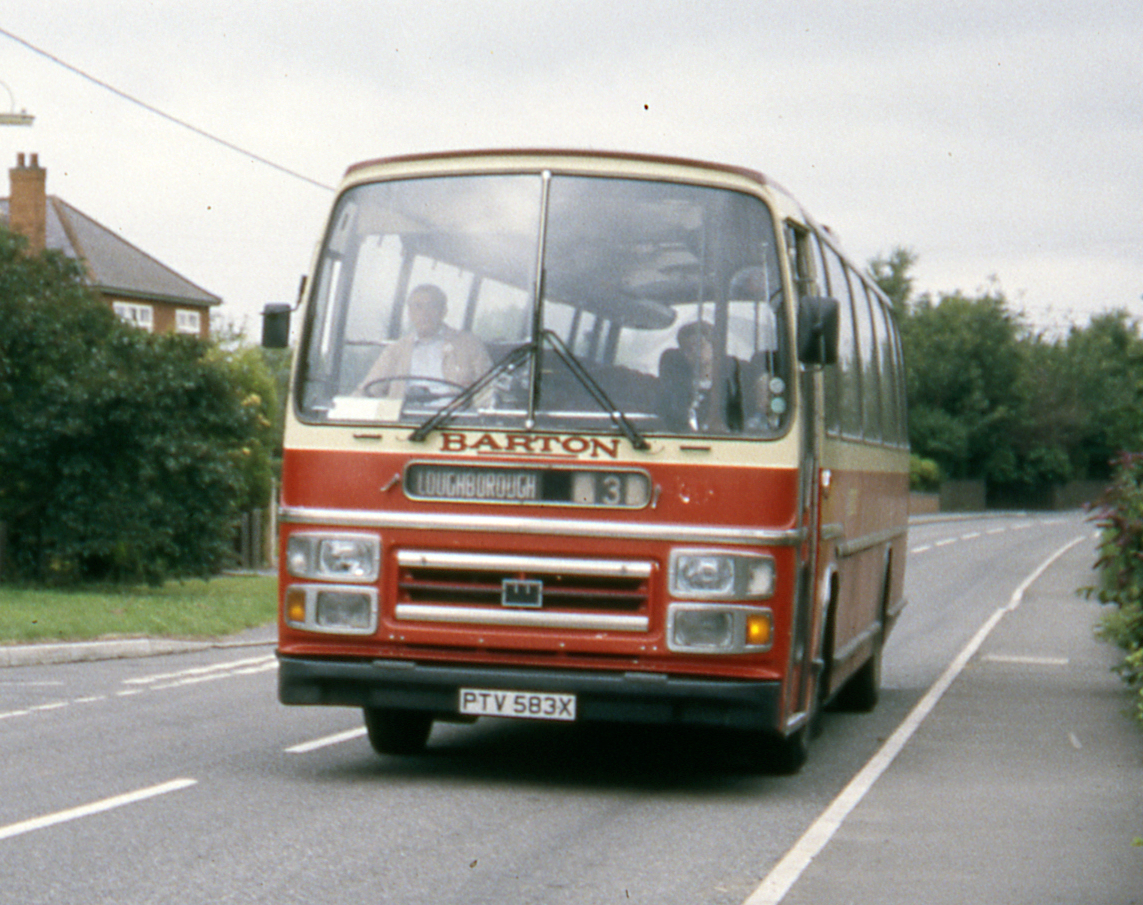
- Plaxton Supreme bodied Leyland Leopard in Long Whatton in 1989
- Founded: 1908
- Ceased operation: 1989
- Headquarters: Chilwell
- Service area: Nottinghamshire
- Service type: Bus operator

Barton Transport was a bus company that operated in Nottinghamshire from 1908 until 1989.

== History ==
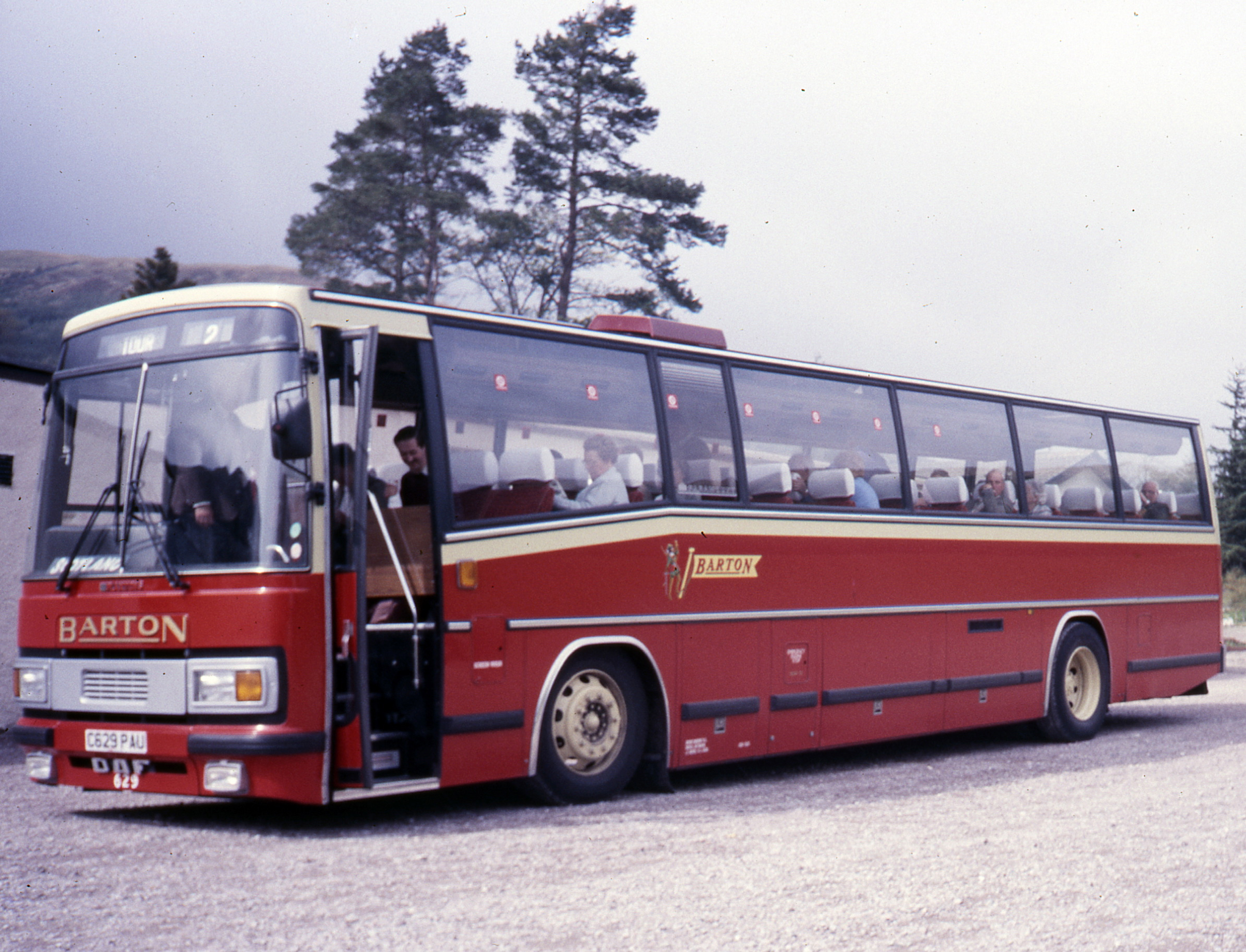
Plaxton Paramount bodied DAF MB200

=== Early years ===
In October 1908, Thomas Henry Barton used a Durham Churchill charabanc to start the company's first service, between Long Eaton and the Nottingham Goose Fair. (Many years later, in 1953, Barton built a replica of its original Durham Churchill vehicle, using a Daimler chassis dating from 1911.)

Barton had already had experience of operating a motorised bus, in Mablethorpe, some nine years earlier.

During World War I, the fleet was used to transport workers to and from the National Shell Filling Factory, Chilwell. Also during the War, Barton pioneered the use of town gas as fuel, converting the whole fleet to run on it. The gas was stored in a large "bag" on the roof of the bus, and the company also manufactured these bags for sale to other operators.

The 1920s saw fierce competition in the British bus industry. Barton imported Lancia chassis from Italy, which were lengthened and fitted with a patented tag-axle by Barton. The vehicles were known as "Bartons Gliders" and their speed and smooth riding provided a competitive advantage.

Barton scored a first by operating the first diesel-engined passenger-carrying road vehicle, a Lancia, in 1930. Barton had earlier been an engineer at Hornsbys where he had worked on the early development of "oil engines" (he always refused to use the term "diesel"). Leylands were purchased from the mid-1930s and made up a large part of the fleet by the beginning of World War II. Starting in 1939, a fleet of Leyland Titan TD5, TD7 and rebodied TD1 double-deckers with stylish, front-entrance, lowbridge bodywork by Duple and Willowbrook was purchased, which appeared very modern by the standards of the day.

=== Postwar ===
Although Barton gained a reputation for having a varied fleet of vehicles during the 1950s and 1960s, from 1946-9 the vast majority of new chassis were from Leyland, and virtually all coachwork was from Duple. The Duple A type coach was chosen for PS1 Single deckers, some featuring a more compact front-design allowing up to 39 seats in the then maximum overall length of 27 ft 6in. The 40 postwar double deckers on PD1 or PD1A had an updated version of the forward entrance lowbridge body with more brightwork and power-operation for the entry door. Barton was a prolific rebuilder of buses — between 1950 and 1955, fifty-eight BTS1 "Viewmaster" single-deck coaches were rebuilt from Leyland Titan, Tiger, and Lion chassis; between 1959 and 1961, seven BTD2 full-fronted double-deckers were created from the chassis of a Leyland Tiger and six Titans; and between 1969 and 1971, eleven AEC Reliance chassis were rebuilt as Barton BTS2 and fitted with new Plaxton Panorama Elite bodywork.

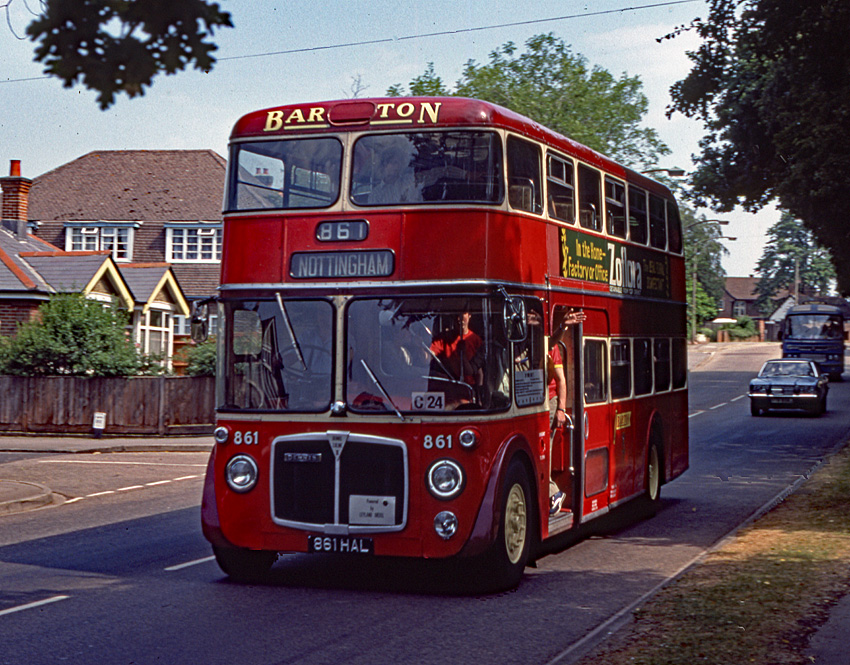
Barton's unique Dennis Loline, 1984

Many new and secondhand buses also joined the fleet, and Barton kept up its modern double-deck image with Northern Counties bodied AEC Regents, which had wrap-around windscreens on both decks. Also built to the same style was a unique vehicle, no. 861, which had lowbridge bodywork on a lowheight Dennis Loline chassis, and was the lowest ever roofed British double-decker. It was specially designed to pass under an ultra low railway bridge at Sawley Junction, now Long Eaton, station.

During the 1950s, Barton had over 280 vehicles and 1,000 employees. Numerous smaller companies were purchased, especially in the 1960s, including Hall Brothers of South Shields on Tyneside (1967), and Robin Hood Coaches of Nottingham (1963), whose emblem was retained and applied to the whole fleet.

=== 1970s and 1980s ===
From the early 1970s, Barton began to standardise on new coaches for all of its purchases. Most were either Leyland Leopards or Bedford Y series, and the large majority had Plaxton Elite Express or Supreme Express bodywork, built with a wide doorway and other minor modifications making them eligible for a Government grant towards their purchase. The wide variety of older vehicles was eradicated within a few years. By this time Barton was Britain's largest independent bus operator, and it was very unusual for such a large operator to use coaches on all of its local services, as well as on tours and express work. In 1981 the company joined the British Coachways consortium which competed with National Express on long-distance routes. The consortium was wound up in 1982.

In 1983, Barton bought five Leyland Tigers and five DAF MB200s with Plaxton Paramount bodywork, these being the company's first modern 12m coaches, although not its first 12m vehicles, since Barton had experimented with lengthening a Daimler bus to 40' before World War I. From 1984 until the sale of the fleet in 1989, Barton standardised on the DAF MB with Plaxton Paramount bodywork, a further 26 being purchased.

In 1989, the business was sold to the Wellglade Group and merged with its Trent Buses business to form Trent Barton.

=== Centenary ===
On 1 October 2008, the journey of the first Barton bus, from Long Eaton to Nottingham's Market Square, was recreated to mark the centenary of the company. Buses and coaches from each decade of service travelled along the route, becoming more modern in turn.

== Other operations ==
Barton also had a road freight haulage operation for a number of years.

From 1929 until 1991, Barton had a 50% shareholding in South Notts Bus Company, based in nearby Gotham.

The Barton company still exists today, having dropped "transport" from its title, it is known as Barton Holdings, mainly involved in property ownership. The Chilwell depot site was the subject of an unsuccessful planning application in 2007, which would have seen the sprawling site redeveloped into housing and retail.

== Livery ==
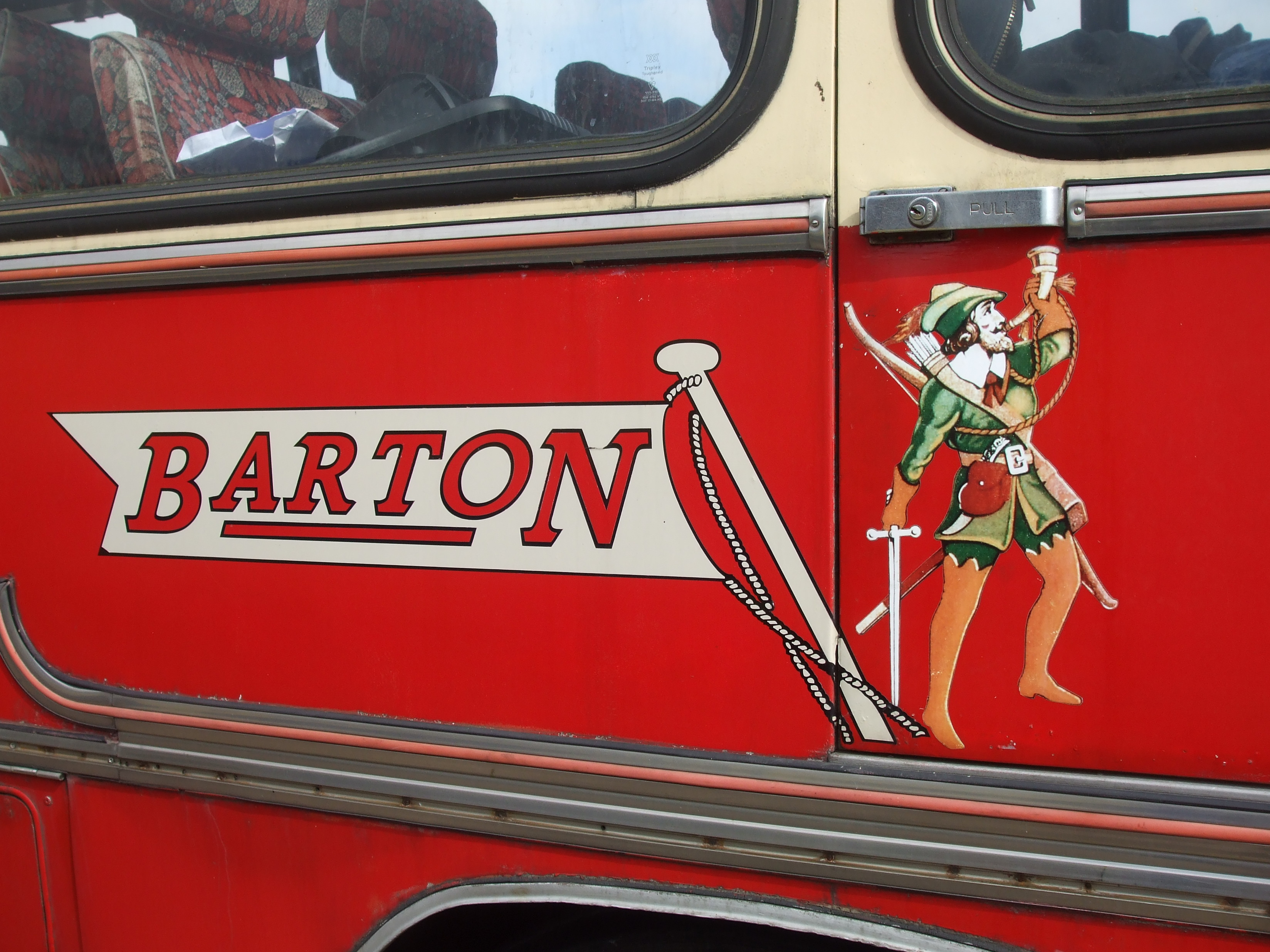
Barton Transport flag & Robin Hood logo carried on a preserved coach

Barton's fleet livery was red, cream and maroon. The fleetname (rendered as B^{ARTO}N) was placed within a flag motif on the vehicle sides, and, from the 1960s onwards, a detailed picture of Robin Hood was placed alongside following the acquisition by Barton of Robin Hood (Coaches) Limited of Nottingham in late 1961.

== Depots ==
Barton operated from many depots and outstations over the years. The largest depot was at the company's headquarters in Chilwell. Others included:

- Long Eaton
- Ilkeston
- Melton Mowbray
- Leicester
- Stamford
- Kegworth
- South Shields
- Castle Donington

Barton's former depot on Huntingdon Street in Nottingham was Grade II listed in August 2019. The building was opened in 1939, and was constructed in the Moderne architecture style typical of the period. At the time of listing the building was still owned by the Barton family company, who had submitted planning approval for it to be "dismantled with care" and eventually re-erected at their corporate headquarters in Chilwell, to allow redevelopment of the city centre site.

== See also ==
List of bus operators of the United Kingdom
