= Plaxton Paramount =

Range of step-entrance coach bodywork

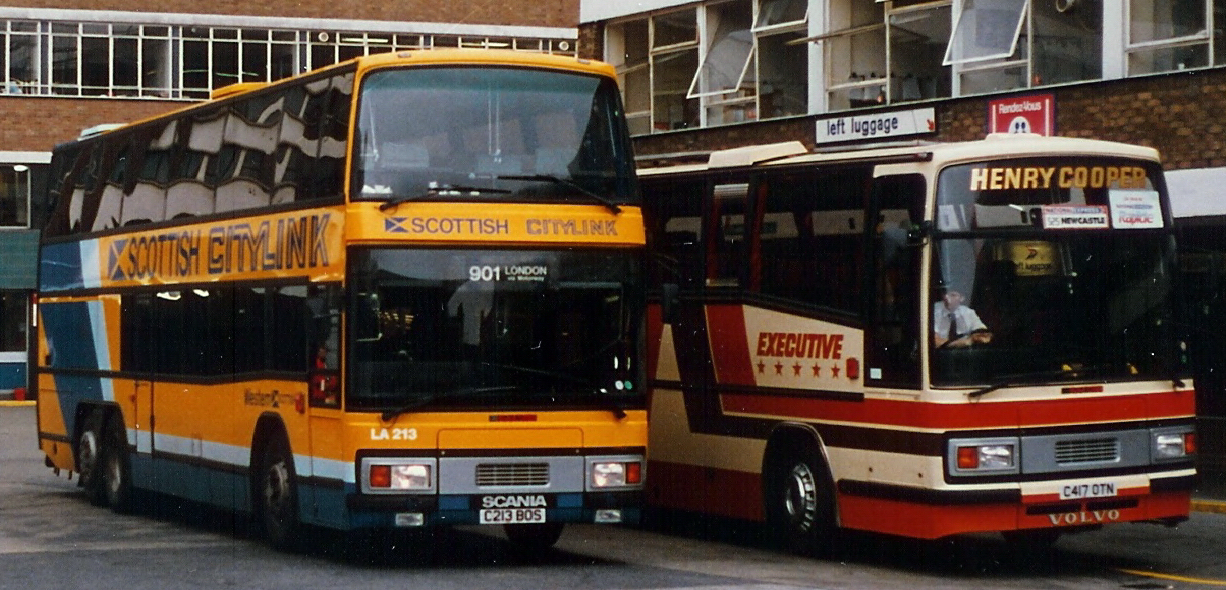
- Plaxton Paramount II 4000 and 3500 coaches at Victoria Coach Station in 1987

Overview
- Manufacturer: Plaxton
- Production: 1982–1992
- Assembly: Scarborough, North Yorkshire, England

Body and chassis
- Doors: 1 door
- Floor type: Step-entrance
- Chassis: Paramount 3200 and 3500; ACE Puma; Bedford VAS Bedford Y series DAF MB200 & MB230; DAF SB2005; DAF SB2300 & SB2305; DAF SB3000; Dennis Dorchester; Dennis Javelin; Ford R-Series; Leyland Leopard; Leyland Royal Tiger; Leyland Tiger; Mercedes-Benz O303; Quest 80 VM; Scania K92, K93, K112 & K113; Volvo B10M; Volvo B58; Ward Dalesman; Paramount 4000; Auwärter (Neoplan) N722; DAF SBR3000; Scania K112T & K113T; Volvo B10MT

Dimensions
- Length: Paramount 3500; 12.0 m (39.4 ft)
- Width: 2.5 m (8 ft 2 in)
- Height: Paramount 3500; 3.5 m (11 ft)

Chronology
- Predecessor: Plaxton Supreme
- Successor: Plaxton Premiere

The Plaxton Paramount was a design of coach bodywork built by Plaxton. It first appeared at the 1982 British Motor Show, replacing the Supreme V and Viewmaster IV and was built until 1992, where it was replaced in its common single-deck form by the Premiere and Excalibur.

== Design ==
=== Paramount I ===
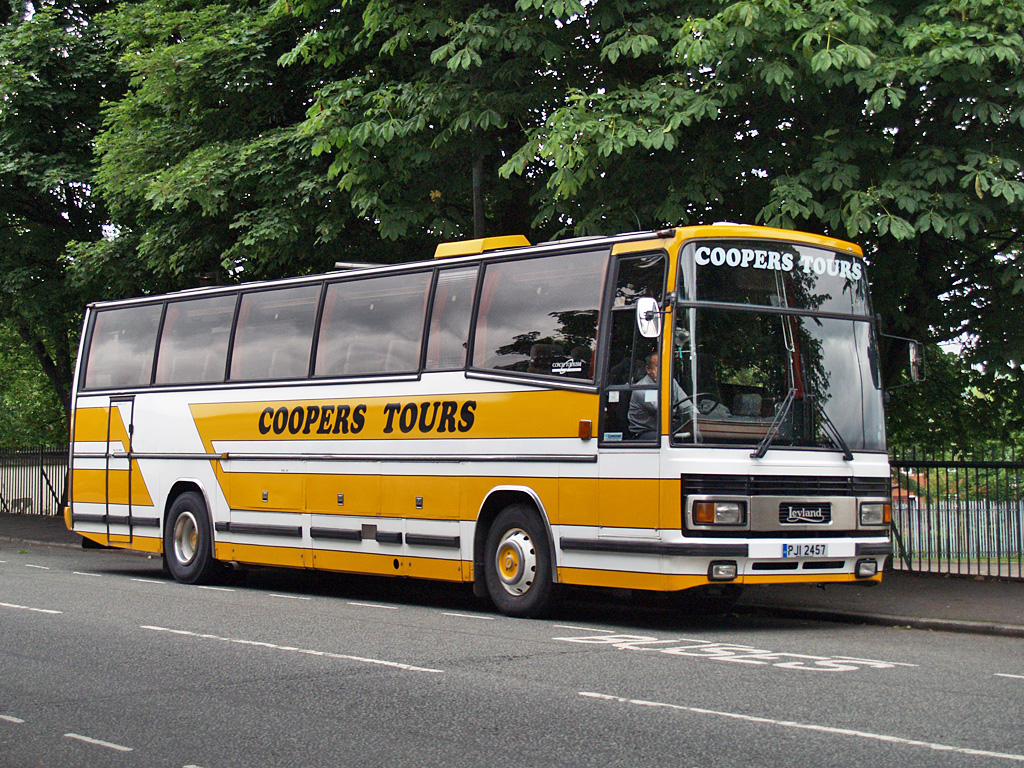
Coopers Tours Paramount 3500 I on Leyland Tiger chassis in Bury in July 2008

Upon its launch in 1982, the Plaxton Paramount was initially available in single-deck form in two heights: the standard floor 3.2 metres (10 ft) Paramount 3200 (initially available in 8–12 metres (26–39 ft) lengths) and the high-floor 3.5 metres (11 ft) Paramount 3500 (available in 11–12 metres (36–39 ft) lengths). Structurally, the Paramount was similar its predecessor, the Supreme, utilising 25 millimetres (0.98 in) square tubing to form the frame. The bodywork was treated inside and out to resist rusting, and utilised a continuous steel panel below the windows that was Zintec-coated for corrosion protection. The front and rear panels, as well as the roof, used GRP panels as did many previous Plaxton coach ranges, and the rear end was similar to that used on the Supreme V and VI, but otherwise the styling was entirely new.

The Paramount had a squarer profile than the Supreme, cleaner lines, a flatter roof line and square-cornered side windows. The window line at over the front wheelarches sloped down to meet a large one-piece windscreen, and behind the sloped window on most bodies was a small 'feature window', uniquely designed with white lines on most bodies. The feature window was omitted on bodies shorter than 10 metres (33 ft), while some operators specified non-standard window spacing without the feature window on longer bodies.

Besides a standard specification equipped with features such as single-speed electric windscreen wipers, Aurora ducted heating systems, adjustable seating strips and a Radiomobile public address system, Plaxton marketed the Paramount in four luxury 'star' packages:

- The '1 Star' Paramount was equipped with a Radiomobile cassette stereo system, steel wheel trims, insulated roofs and lockable fuel fillers, doors and luggage lockers, also with the option for in-house exterior paintwork by Plaxton;
- The '2 Star' Paramount was equipped with reclining seats, a Blaupunkt radio, tinted side windows along with a driver's sunblind, fog lights and spotlights, an air-powered entrance door and two-speed windscreen wipers;
- The '3 Star' Paramount was equipped with an engine pre-heater manufactured by either Webasto or Eberspacher, double glazed tinted windows, a roof extractor fan, Tempo 100 heaters, interior roofs with moquette trim, a 'plug' entrance door and additional 'crew' seat by the entrance door;
- The '4 Star' Paramount was equipped with an in-built toilet, an offside continental door, and carpeted or moquetted trim to the on side panels and overhead luggage racks.

==== Paramount 4000 double-decker ====
Yorkshire Traction Paramount 4000 double-decker bodied Neoplan N722/3 in Skegness

In 1984, the Paramount I design was adapted by Ogle Design to create the Paramount 4000 double-decker coach, initially built on Neoplan chassis as a competititor to the Neoplan Skyliner. Paramount 4000 bodied Neoplans were equipped with a Mercedes OM403 16-litre 352 brake horsepower (262 kW) V10 engine with a choice of either maaual or ZF HP500 gearbox. The first prototype model was delivered in early 1984 to Excelsior European Motorways of Bournemouth and was valued at £122,000 (equivalent to £397,000 in 2025).

The Paramount 4000 was later offered on the Volvo B10M Tandem chassis, as well as the DAF SBR3000 and Scania K112TR chassis.

=== Paramount II ===
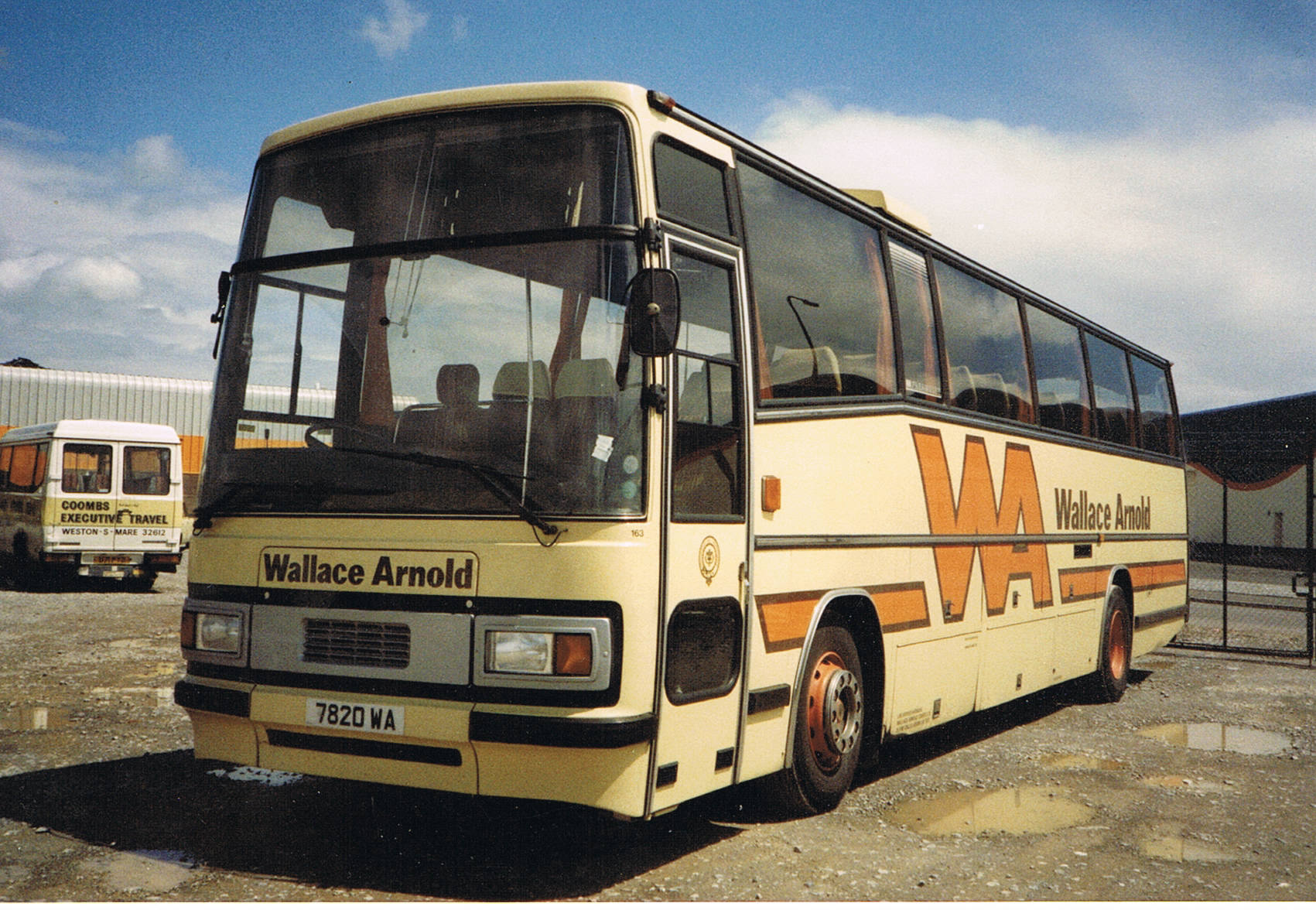
Wallace Arnold Paramount 3500 II on Volvo B10M chassis in Weston-super-Mare

The Paramount II, the first update to the original single-deck design, was launched in late 1984 for the 1985 season. Externally, the Paramount II incorporated only minor visual changes, removing the black full width grille moulding above the headlights and recolouring the small grille between the headlights and the trim around the headlights themselves from black to silver. Paramount II bodies on front-engined Ford R-series chassis retained the Paramount I frontal treatment as the large grille was needed to ventilate the radiator. The chrome strip immediately below the side windows was also made continuous, rather than having a gap to accentuate the small feature window as on the Paramount I. Bonded window glazing was introduced as an option alongside the regular gasket glazing.

Internal modifications included deeper parcel racks that were capable of supporting air conditioning. A tweed like material was used to cover the interior skirt and a large part of the racks.

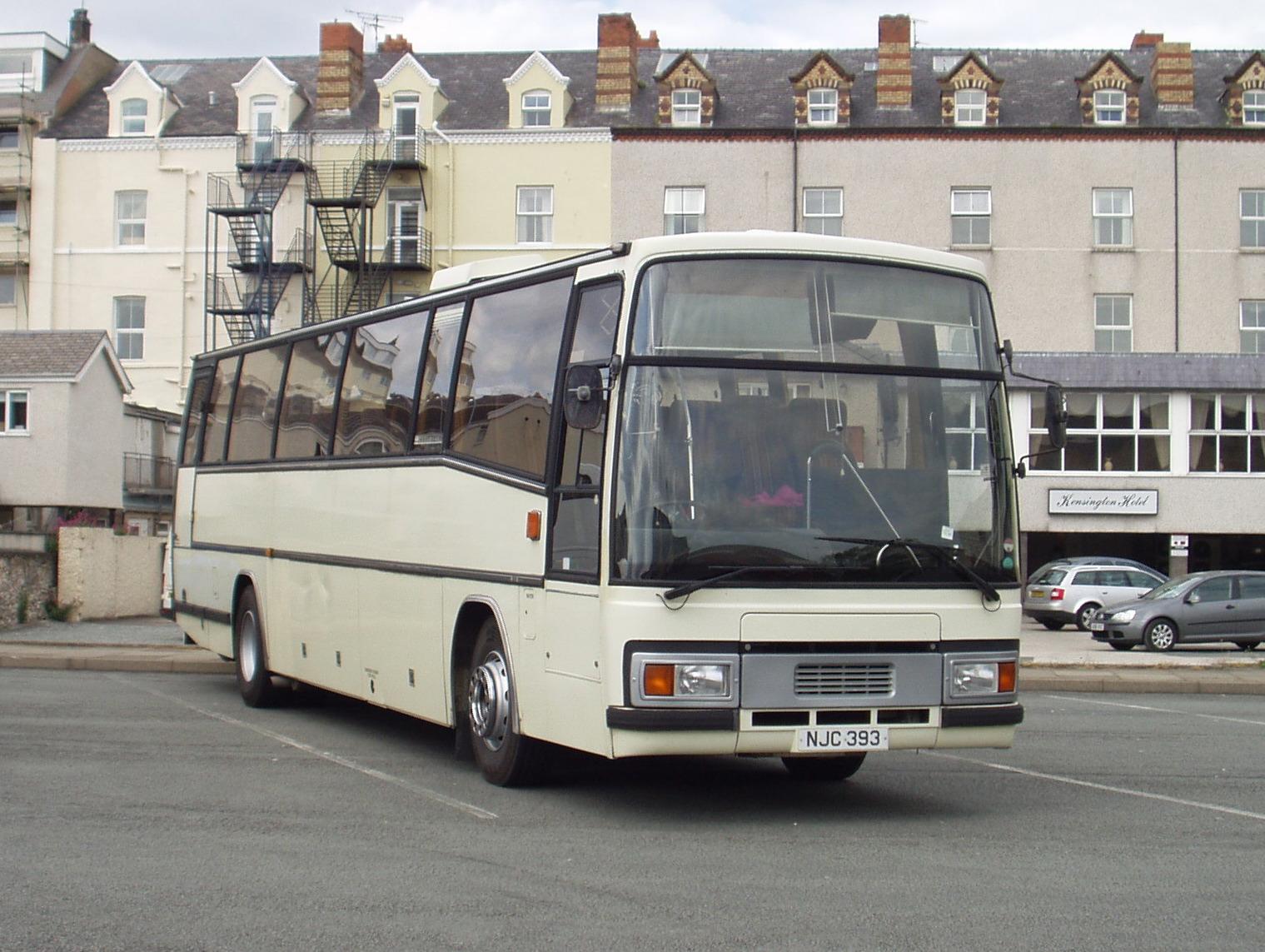
Carreglefn Paramount 3200 II LS on Volvo B10M chassis in Llandudno in June 2008

A batch of 20 non-standard Paramount 3200 I bodies built on Quest 80 VM chassis for Excelsior Holidays featured a low driving position, in which the driver sat lower in the body so that passengers had a better view ahead, the headlights being closer to the road than usual. With the launch of the Paramount II, this became more generally available as the Paramount 3200 LS and 3500 LS. The Paramount 3200 LS used the two-piece 3500 windscreen, whereas the 3500 LS had a deeper two-piece windscreen unique to the type. Also new in 1985 was the Paramount 4000 RS, on mid-engined Volvo B10MT chassis. This was a 1½-deck version of the 4000, with a small lower deck saloon at the rear.

In 1986, the Paramount was made available on the Bedford VAS5 midicoach, allowing the Supreme range to be retired. Shortly afterwards, however, Bedford withdrew from the bus market after only eleven VAS5 Paramounts were built. Although sometimes referred to as Paramount 3200s, these bodies were lower in height, as was a one-off body on the unique ACE Puma III.

=== Paramount III ===
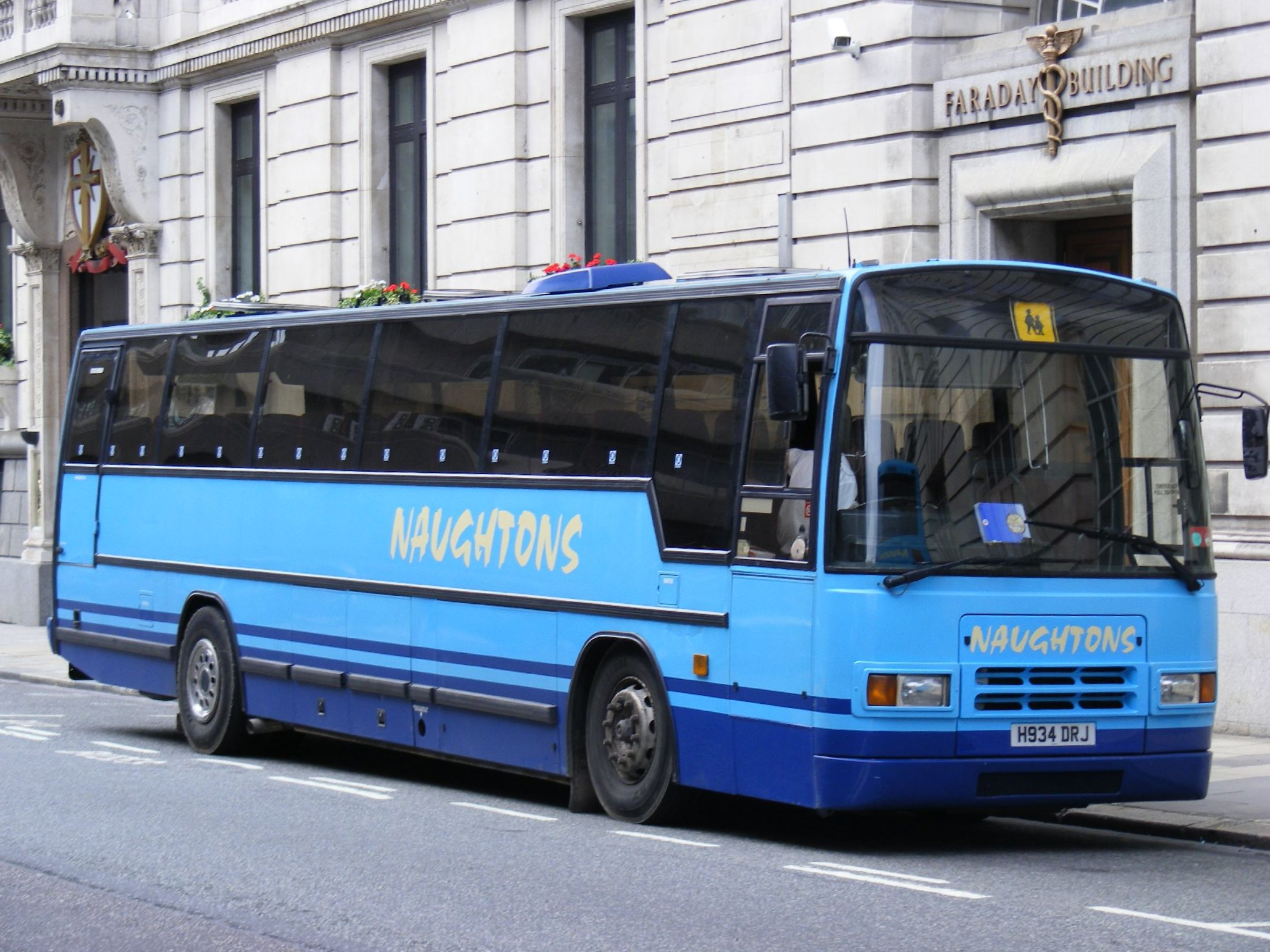
Naighton's Paramount 3200 III on Volvo B10M chassis in the City of London in August 2010

The Paramount III was launched late in 1986. It introduced stronger body structures with bonded glazing as standard and also featured some more obvious changes to the design, notably the replacement of the original sloping and small "feature windows" with one small pentagonal window immediately behind the cab or door, with Plaxton's "castle" logo being engraved on it, though this was omitted on the shortest 8.5 metre bodies.

Changes to the front end consisted of a new grille and bumper, and changes to the shape and angle of the windscreen. The rear window contained a blind like decal at the base with a castle badge in the centre. The dashboard consisted of a moulded cabinet, replacing the Formica and wood of the earlier versions. In the centre of the black finished cabinet was a large "castle" logo. Airline style locker doors were now available on the parcel racks.

The Paramount 4000 II double decker remained in production with no external changes, although in 1989, these were facelifted to receive a Paramount III type front end.

==== Expressliner ====
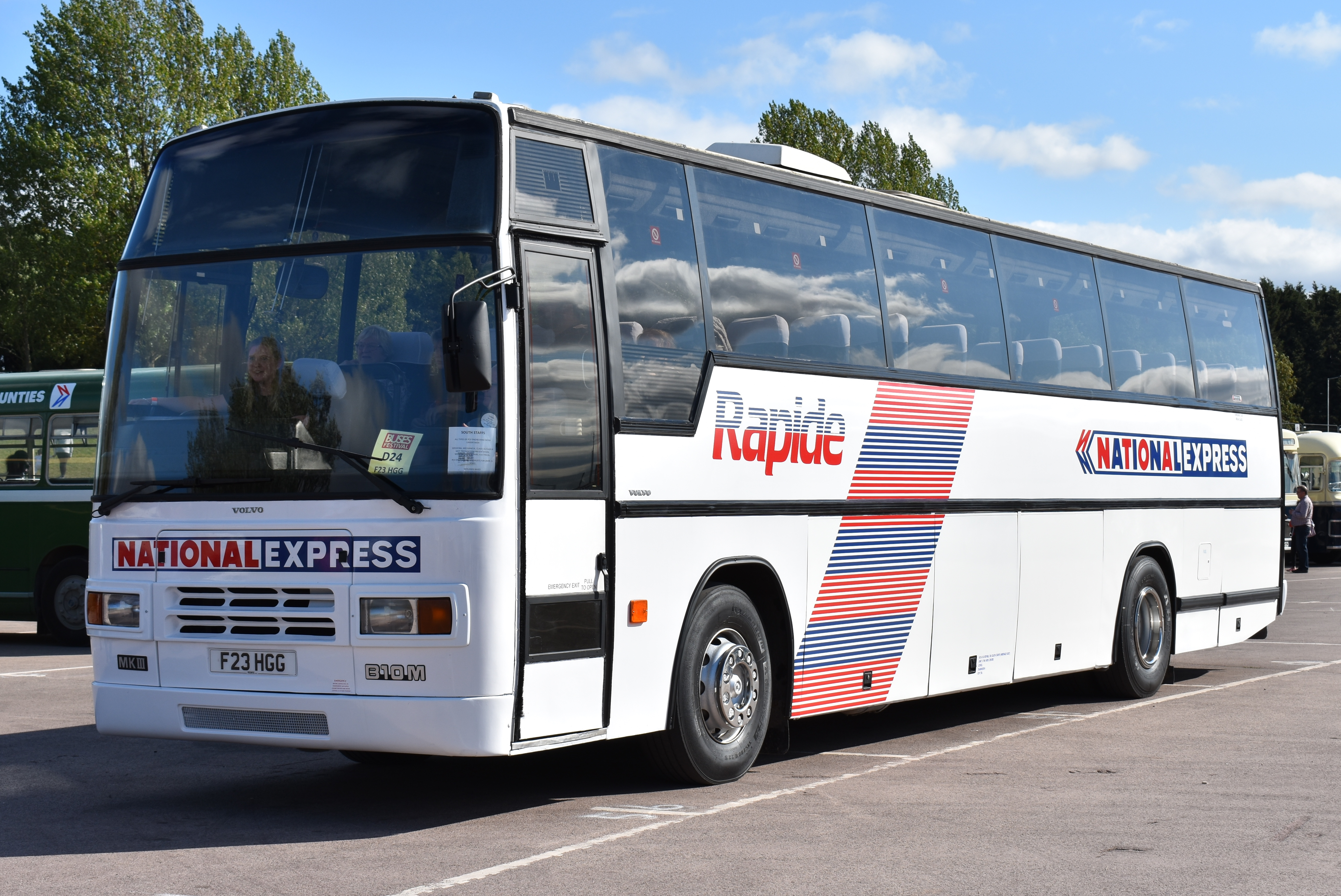
Preserved National Express Rapide Paramount Expressliner bodied Volvo B10M in August 2018

In March 1989, Plaxton launched the Expressliner, a variant of the Plaxton Paramount III 3500 built to National Express specification on Volvo B10M chassis. These coaches were leased through National Expressliners Ltd, a joint venture between Plaxton and National Express that intended to form a uniform fleet of Plaxton-bodied National Express coaches across the United Kingdom.

The Expressliner was equipped as standard with side-loading luggage lockers, a toilet and an on-board servery in Rapide specification, as well as a windowless, moulded plastic rear end featuring an embossed National Express 'double-N' logo, which could be replaced by a standard Paramount rear end when the coach was no longer used for National Express services. A total of 150 Paramount Expressliners were delivered to National Express coach operators before it was succeeded in 1992 by the Plaxton Premiere 350-based Expressliner II on the same Volvo B10M chassis.

==== Mini Paramount ====
A solitary Mini Paramount was built on a Mercedes-Benz 811D van chassis in 1988. Like its predecessor the Mini Supreme it was built at Plaxton's southern service centre at Ware rather than the main Scarborough factory. The sides and rear of the body of similar styling to the larger Paramounts, but it had a standard Mercedes-Benz van bonnet, Supreme IV headlamps and a Mini Supreme windscreen. Only one was built, as the Beaver minibus body made by Plaxton's Reeve Burgess subsidiary could be sold at a more competitive price.

== Chassis ==
The Paramount was built on the following chassis types:

=== Mini Paramount ===
- Mercedes-Benz 811D

=== Paramount 3200 and 3500 ===
- Volvo B10M
- Leyland Tiger
- Bedford Y series
- DAF MB200 and MB230
- Dennis Javelin
- DAF SB2005, SB2300 and SB2305
- Scania K series
- Ford R-Series
- Leyland Royal Tiger
- Leyland Leopard (mostly rebodies)
- Dennis Dorchester
- DAF SB3000
- Mercedes-Benz O303
- Quest 80 VM
- Volvo B58 (rebodies)
- Bedford VAS5
- Ward Dalesman
- ACE Puma IV
- ACE Puma III

=== Paramount 4000 ===
- Auwärter (Neoplan) N722/3
- DAF SBR3000
- Volvo B10MT
- Scania K series
