= British Coachways =

British bus operating company

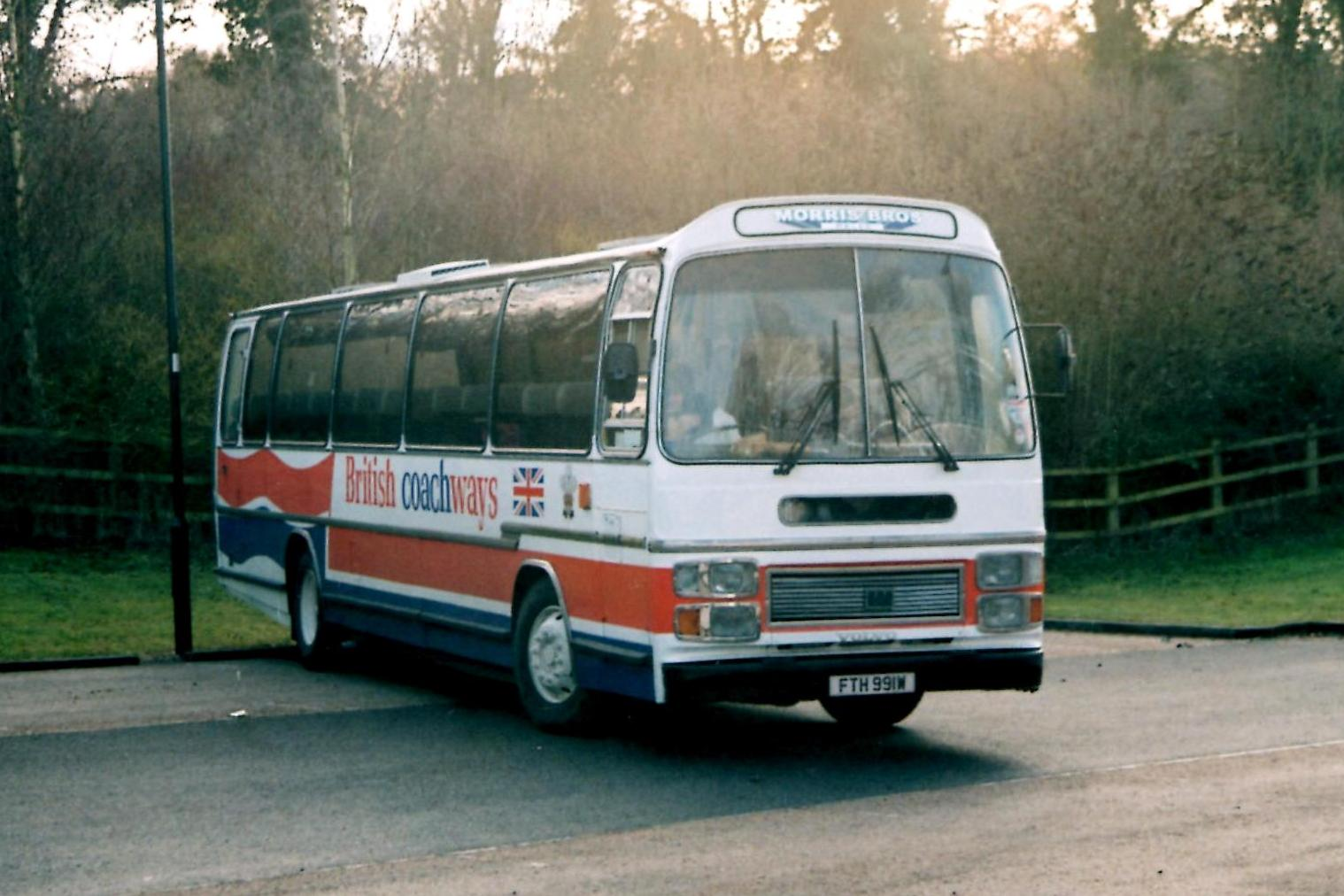
- Preserved Plaxton bodied Volvo B58 in January 2011
- Founded: October 1980
- Ceased operation: October 1982
- Service type: Long distance coach operator
- Routes: 6
- Hubs: London
- Annual ridership: 750,000
- Operator: Barton Transport; Ellerman Bee Line; Excelsior Coaches; Grey-Green; Morris Bros; Park's Motor Group; Shearings; Wallace Arnold; York's; Warner Fairfax

British Coachways was a consortium of independent coach operating companies in the United Kingdom. Formed immediately after the deregulation of coach services in October 1980, it competed with the state-owned National Express and Scottish Bus Group on a range of long-distance routes. Initially composed of six members, it varied in size and composition over its two years of operation to include a range of ten different companies.

The consortium attempted to draw passengers away from the established services by charging significantly lower fares than the existing operators. National Express and Scottish Bus Group responded by reducing fares to similar levels, reducing the appeal of British Coachways' services. In contrast to National Express, operators were given the choice of which vehicle type to operate, so a variety of types were used.

The consortium was not granted access to large facilities in major cities, such as Victoria Coach Station in London, and was forced to use less developed alternative sites. In October 1982 British Coachways was broken up and the brand name abandoned. All but one of its services ceased to operate. The sole survivor was the service between London and Bournemouth, which continued to be operated by former British Coachways member Excelsior Coaches until 1998.

== History ==
=== Background and creation ===
Prior to 1980, the majority of long-distance coach services in the United Kingdom were operated by National Express Coaches (NEX), a subsidiary of the state-owned National Bus Company (NBC), which sourced its vehicles from other NBC subsidiaries. Coach services in Scotland, including routes between Scotland and England, were operated by the subsidiaries of the Scottish Bus Group (SBG), which was also state-owned. On 6 October 1980, the coach service market was deregulated by the Transport Act 1980.

To compete effectively with the large and well-recognised network operated by the state-owned companies, a group of established independent coach operators decided to form a consortium to run over a range of routes. The group initially comprised Wallace Arnold, based in Leeds; Grey-Green, operating from London; Shearings of Altrincham; Morris Bros of Swansea; Ellerman Bee Line, of Middlesbrough; and Park's Motor Group, based in Hamilton. The six companies owned a combined fleet of over 700 coaches. The consortium chose the name British Coachways to present a nationwide image, and a small number of coaches received a new livery of white, red and blue to advertise the venture.

=== Into service and problems ===
British Coachways began operation on the day that coach services were deregulated, 6 October 1980, on a network based around five service corridors linking London with major population centres. To make its services attractive to passengers, the consortium charged extremely low fares, including some that were less than half of the cheapest fare offered by the rival NEX or SBG service. This meant that profit margins were very low. In addition, the venture suffered from not being able to use recognised departure points in some major cities, most notably Victoria Coach Station in London and Digbeth Coach Station in Birmingham.

The lower fares were intended to draw passengers away from the established services. However, within weeks of British Coachways commencing operation National Express cut their fares to match those offered by the consortium, reducing the appeal of the new routes. In Scotland the change was equally dramatic. Prior to deregulation, the cheapest fare offered by SBG between London and Glasgow was £23. British Coachways undercut this with a £15 return fare, which was also hoped to attract more passengers away from British Rail's services between the two cities. By May 1981, the consortium had increased its fare to £17, while SBG was charging only £15 for the same journey. Additional competition on the corridor was provided by Cotters Tours, which introduced a more expensive high-quality service between London and Glasgow in December 1980.

Passenger numbers were reasonable in the first year of the venture, but low compared to those achieved by the established services. In May 1981, it was reported that British Coachways' London-Glasgow service was carrying around 1,500 passengers per week, while the competing SBG service managed around 4,000 passengers per week over the same period. Loadings on British Coachways services were around half the capacity provided in its first year, although there was considerable variation between routes and journeys. The venture broke even but made no profit at the end of the 1980/81 financial year.

At the end of the first year of operation, the consortium had carried 750,000 passengers in total. Over the same period, NEX carried 12.5 million people over its network. Despite the introduction of British Coachways' competing routes, NEX's net profit increased by over 50% between 1980 and 1981.

Members of the consortium began to pull out in April 1981. By the summer of 1981 both Wallace Arnold and Grey-Green left the group; by the end of the year, both were operating joint services with National Express. However, Barton Transport and Excelsior Coaches joined in their place. The total number of services was not reduced, although some destinations were no longer served, while others were introduced to the network for the first time.

=== Decline and break-up ===
The exit from the group of Wallace Arnold and Grey-Green had seen more responsibility transferred to Shearings, now the largest of the six surviving members of British Coachways. When it pulled out in August 1982, sustaining the operations of the consortium became difficult. Morris Bros also left British Coachways in the summer of 1982, leaving the group with just four constituent companies. On 18 October 1982, the consortium found itself without a terminus in London when the site it had been using became unavailable. Services ceased operation from this date onwards.

== Operations ==
British Coachways initially operated six services linking London to a range of large provincial towns and cities. Services were operated from London to Newcastle and Middlesbrough; to Sheffield, Leeds and Bradford; to Swansea via Cardiff; to Plymouth and Torbay via Bristol; to Glasgow via Birmingham and Manchester; and to Liverpool via Birmingham. In each case, the terminal point was located close to a depot owned by one of the consortium's members, and the majority of workings were operated by the company whose region the service ran to. Grey-Green, who were based in London, operated journeys on all six routes.

The routes from Devon and Wales also served London Heathrow Airport. Glasgow and Liverpool were served twice per day; the other routes ran once daily with additional journeys on Fridays, Saturdays and Sundays. The sole exception to this pattern was the Torbay service, operated by the Devon subsidiary of Wallace Arnold, which ran twice daily four days a week and did not operate on the other three days.

With Victoria Coach Station unavailable as a London terminus, the operation instead used the then-new Kings Cross Coach Station, on the site of a former railway goods yard near St Pancras station, which had few passenger or employee facilities. The site is now occupied by the British Library. In 1982 this was changed to the London Ryan Hotel in King's Cross. Similar issues were encountered in other cities: in Glasgow, a small stop on Holland Street was initially used, while in Manchester services picked up at an unmarked stop in Aytoun Street. From August 1981, a new Glasgow terminal in Sauchiehall Street was opened by Park's for use by British Coachways and other independent coach operators.

Journey times offered by British Coachways between the major cities were often quicker than those on the corresponding NEX or SBG services, as intermediate locations were omitted. NEX responded to this by following a similar policy: for example, the journey time between London and Manchester reduced from over five hours prior to deregulation to around four hours after British Coachways began competing on the corridor.

The withdrawal of Wallace Arnold from the group in 1981 meant that the services to Yorkshire and Devon no longer came under the British Coachways network. Excelsior Coaches brought with it a service from London to Bournemouth and Poole. Operations ceased on 17 October 1982 when the London Ryan Hotel ceased to be available as a terminus. Many of the operators involved continued to operate some of their routes as joint services with National Express.

== Brand and marketing ==
The companies that formed British Coachways in 1980 believed that a strong marketing campaign would be required to counter the established network offered by the incumbent operators. Wallace Arnold, the largest of the six founding members, and Grey-Green, the only constituent company based in London, designed the marketing used to promote British Coachways in its first year. A striking new livery of white, red and blue incorporating the Union Flag similar to that used by the state-owned airline British Airways was introduced for publicity material and vehicles, and the patriotic slogan "Ride the flag" used.

A small number of coaches owned by the six members were painted into the consortium's livery, although the majority remained in the liveries of their owners. Promotional leaflets were issued to publicise the venture. These included timetables and fare information, together with content about the individual operators behind the group. Advantages claimed over rival services included significantly lower fares than competing coach and rail services, the age and quality of coaches used, ease of booking and the expertise and history of the operators involved.

Mike Kay was appointed marketing director for the consortium, and received interviews in local newspapers to complement the advertising campaign. When both Wallace Arnold and Grey-Green left British Coachways in 1981, marketing responsibilities passed to Shearings; after the latter company itself left the group in August 1982, national marketing campaigns ceased, although the remaining operators continued to market services within their local regions.

Despite its efforts, British Coachways was unable to challenge National Express in terms of creating a nationally known brand. The individual members were well-known only in their home areas, and the advertising campaign was constrained by a lack of flexibility and capital. NEX was known nationally and possessed significant levels of customer awareness and goodwill.

== Vehicles ==
One significant difference between National Express and British Coachways was the type of coaches used on services. NEX required that vehicles used on its services were built to its specifications. In the early 1980s, all NBC subsidiaries with NEX work used Leyland Leopards with Plaxton bodywork. British Coachways had no such requirement. Vehicle types were decided by the operators themselves, so a wide range of types were used.

The Leyland Leopard proved popular with some members of British Coachways, including Ellerman Bee Line, Barton Transport, Wallace Arnold and Grey-Green, although the latter specified Duple bodywork instead of Plaxton. Other operators contributed different types. Morris Bros of Swansea used Volvo B58 coaches on its routes from South Wales to London. The most varied fleet, however, was that of Park's, which contained Leyland Leopards, DAF SB2005 integrals and a small number of rare MAN SR280s imported from Germany.

== Subsequent history and legacy ==
The dissolution of British Coachways in October 1982 led to the withdrawal of all but one of its former routes by the four surviving constituent companies. Many of the companies went on to operate as contractors for National Express. The only route to continue was Excelsior's London-Poole service, which operated in competition with National Express until February 1998, when it was taken over by the larger operator.

The competition created by the 1980 Transport Act caused NEX's market share to reduce temporarily, although its passenger numbers increased in real terms. The lower fares, improved vehicle quality and better timetabling introduced after deregulation meant that its market share had recovered within three years. These improvements have since been attributed to the quality and cost of services offered by competing operators.

After the demise of British Coachways, National Express faced little competition for two decades. By 2001, significant competition by independents had reduced to only two routes, including the London-Glasgow corridor previously served by British Coachways. This situation continued until 2003, when the Stagecoach Group introduced its Megabus network. This differed from British Coachways by providing more frequent services over a wider range of routes, and in its use of nationwide advertising and yield management to set fares, with early bookers to a particular coach paying only £1 for a journey.

British Coachways' brand and livery disappeared rapidly after 1982. Vehicles were quickly painted back into their owners' liveries, and the brand was abandoned. However, in September 2010, a preserved Volvo B58 coach, new to Morris Bros, was painted into British Coachways livery for the thirtieth anniversary of the consortium's formation.
