= Plaxton Supreme =

Design of coach bodywork built by Plaxton

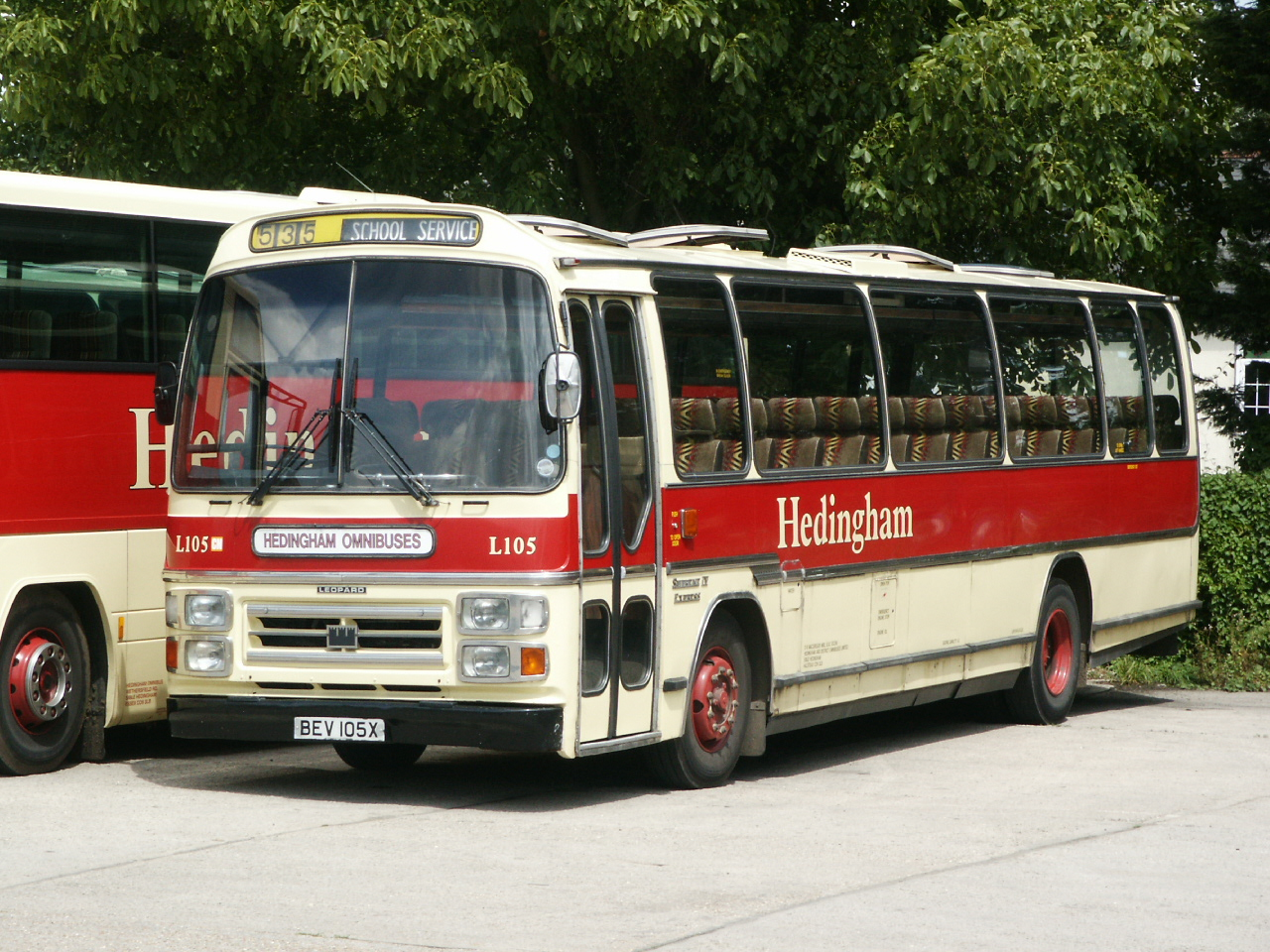
- Supreme IV Express bodied Leyland Leopard

Overview
- Manufacturer: Plaxton
- Production: 1974 - 1986

Body and chassis
- Doors: 1
- Floor type: Step entrance
- Chassis: AEC Reliance; Bedford SB; Bedford VAS; Bedford Y series Bristol LH; DAF MB200; DAF SB2005; Ford R-Series; Leyland Leopard; Leyland Tiger; Magirus-Deutz; MAN; Mercedes-Benz O303; Seddon Pennine 7 Volvo B10M; Volvo B58; Volvo B655; Volvo B755; Ward Dalesman

The Plaxton Supreme was a design of coach bodywork manufactured by Plaxton. It was first built, on small chassis only, in 1974, replacing the Plaxton Panorama. On full-sized chassis, it replaced the Panorama Elite in 1975, and was superseded by the Paramount in 1982/83. However, the Supreme continued to be built on the small Bedford VAS chassis until 1986.

The most important change from the models it replaced was the introduction of all-steel construction, replacing the composite wood and steel framework of the Elite and Panorama.

== Chassis ==
Supreme bodywork was fitted to a wide range of chassis, including:

- AEC Reliance
- Bedford SB, VAS and Y Series
- Bristol LH
- DAF MB200 and SB2005
- Ford R-Series
- Leyland Leopard and Tiger
- MAN (export only)
- Magirus-Deutz (export only)
- Mercedes-Benz O303
- Seddon Pennine 7
- Volvo B10M, B58, B655 (export rebodies) and B755 (export rebodies)
- Ward Dalesman

Over 180 were built for operators in Denmark and The Netherlands.

== Versions ==
=== Supreme I, II and III ===
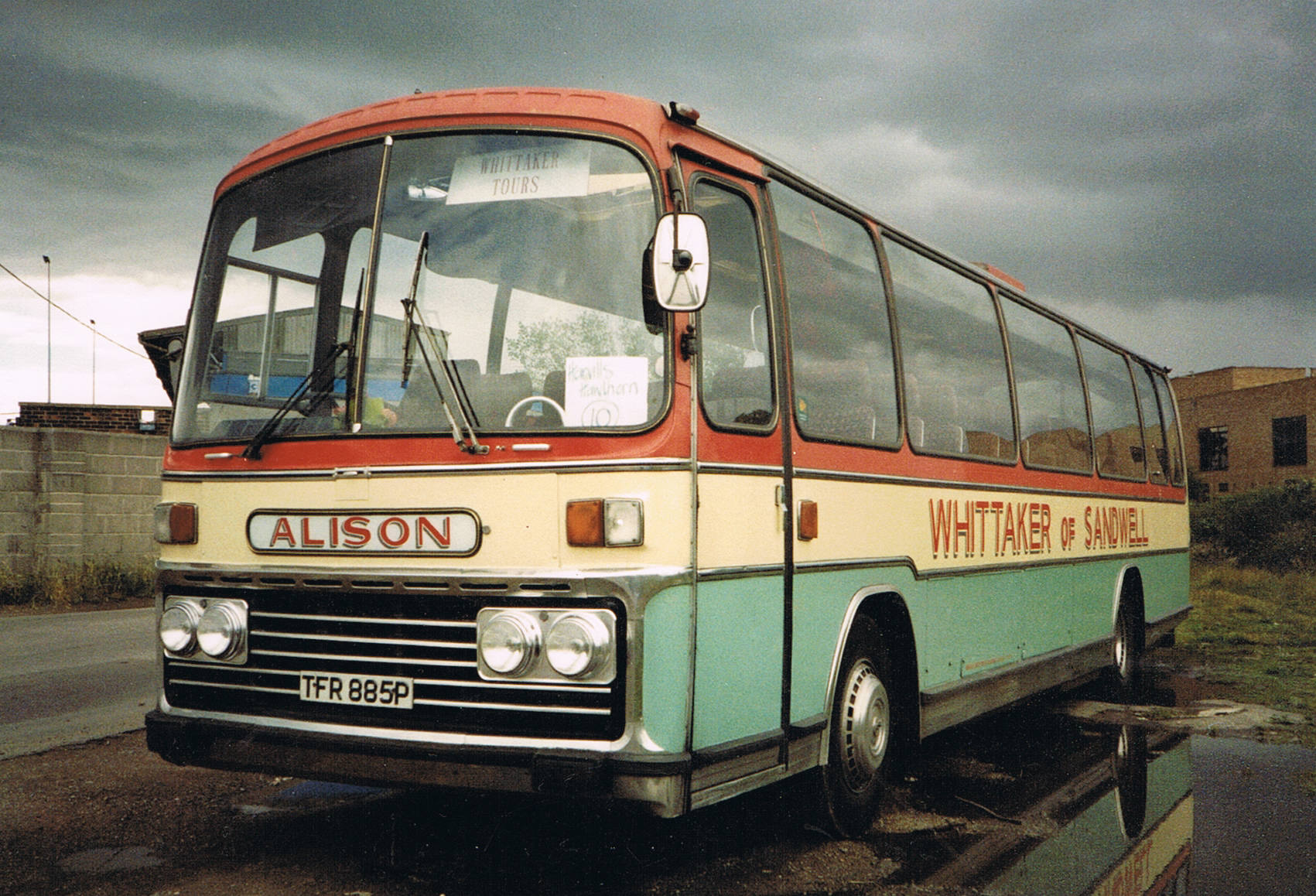
Supreme bodied Ford

These were all badged as "Supreme" only, with no numerals to distinguish the different variants. As a result, the definitions are not clear. Plaxton's centenary website states that the Supreme I was built on the Bedford VAS chassis, and the Supreme II on the Bristol LHS. However the spare parts manuals state that the Supreme II was built with composite wooden/steel frames on full-size chassis, such as the Leyland Leopard, Bedford YLQ/YMT, Ford R1014/R1114, AEC and Volvo B58. The Supreme III was built with entirely steel framing. Wooden and steel framed examples were built in parallel during the 1976, 1977 and 1978 seasons, the difference being undetectable from the outside, but determined by the body number suffix AM (All Metal) or the letter M in the middle of the body number.

Its design features clearly echoed those of the Elite III but with subtly evolved shape and trim. The windscreen shape was altered to have a more heavily arched top, with vertical ridges above it where the Elite had had horizontal ridges. The grille surround was integrated with the front bumper, and the panel between the headlights was usually omitted resulting in a larger grille. Side trim generally included two chrome strips along the sides, the lower one having either one or two curved kinks in it. The rear end is less rounded than the Elite's.

=== Supreme IV ===
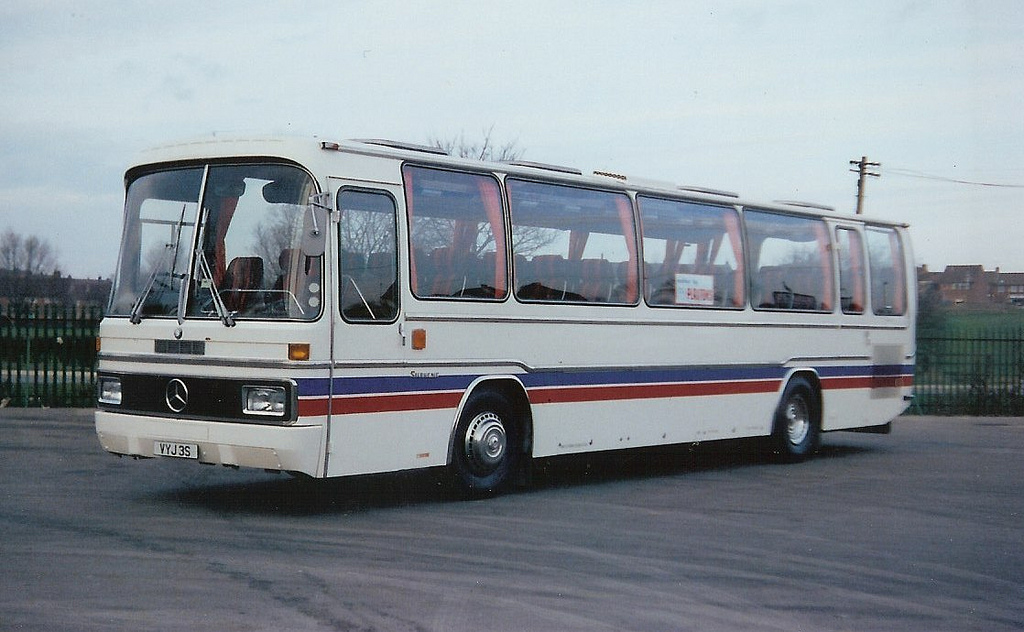
Supreme IV bodied Mercedes-Benz O303 at the Plaxton factory in 1978

The design received a facelift in 1978, with the first examples of the new Supreme IV entering service towards the end of that year. The windscreen shape was altered again, this time to have a flatter top, and the ridged area above it was done away with. The grille and headlight area underwent a complete revision, with twin rectangular headlights flanking a grille of three chunky slats (although some vehicles had an optional rectangular chrome grille). The kink in the side trim was replaced by a parallelogram-shaped link between straight sections, and the window in the door was deeper.

=== Supreme V ===
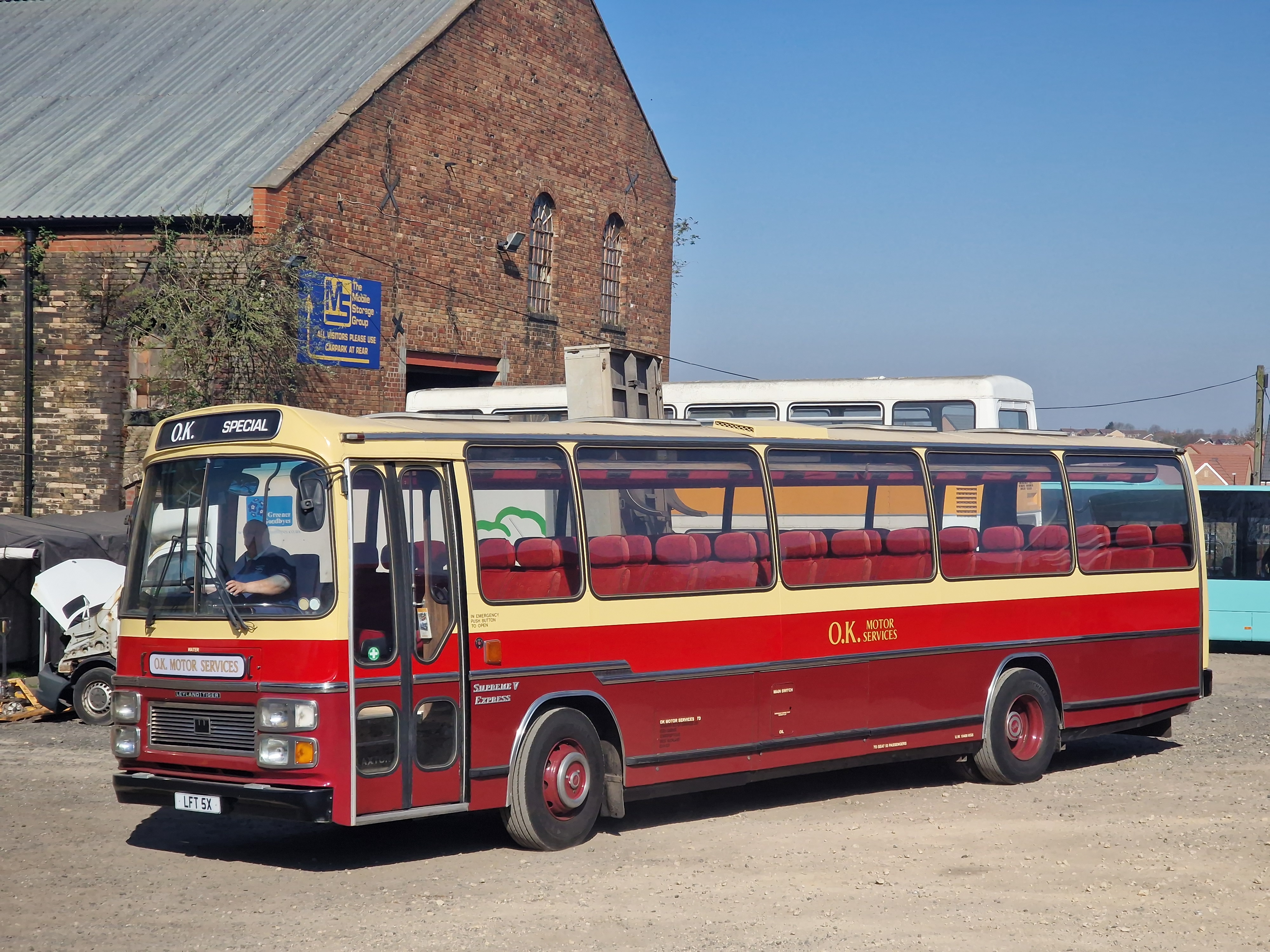
Preserved Supreme V bodied Leyland Tiger in April 2025

A completely new rear end, superficially similar to that later used on the Paramount, was designed for the Supreme V. It had a flat rear window and large rectangular light clusters. The front and sides were unchanged from the Supreme IV.

=== Supreme VI ===
The Supreme VI, built alongside the Supreme V, had the same front and rear ends as the latter but with shallow, flat side windows. It was aimed at overnight express services.

=== Supreme Express ===
All of the larger Supremes were available to "express" or "grant" specification with wide doorway and two-piece doors. These variants were badged Supreme Express, Supreme IV Express, Supreme V Express and Supreme VI Express. (This was in contrast to the Elite series, where the numeral was placed after the word Express.)

=== Viewmaster and Viewmaster IV ===
The Viewmaster was a taller version of the Supreme III or IV, with the height increased by approximately 10 inches (250 mm). This did initially cause some problems as the initial models were too top heavy and were liable to fall over, so modifications was needed to the original design to lower the centre of gravity. The designers claimed that the original design would not fall over, but the engineers argued otherwise and were eventually proven right. The windscreen on the Viewmaster was a taller version of that used on the Supreme III, and was retained unaltered for the Viewmaster IV. Both were also available to "express" specification, as the Viewmaster Express and Viewmaster IV Express respectively.

=== Mini Supreme ===
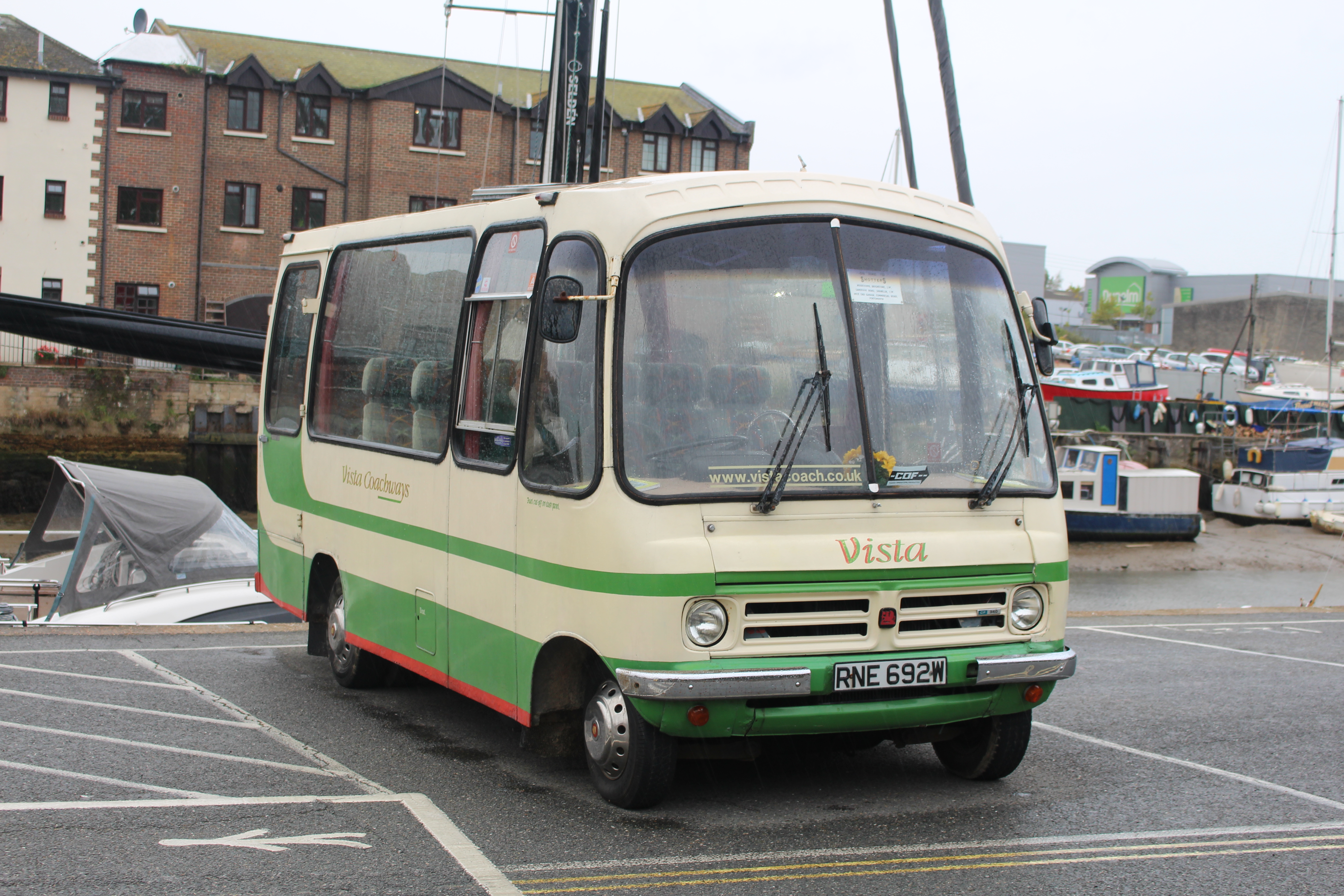
Mini Supreme bodied Bedford CFL

This van-derived minicoach version of the Supreme was built at the Plaxton Scarborough Service Division and their Southern Service Centre in Ware, Hertfordshire, the former Thurgood Coachworks, on Bedford CF and Mercedes L608D chassis. As well as providing accident repair and rebuild or refurbishment functions, Ware was tasked with a lot of non-standard coach-building, including all Mini-Supremes and the sole mini-Paramount.
