= Robert Barr (businessman) =

British businessman

Robert Barr (12 December 1888 – 18 July 1961) was a British businessman and founder of the Barr & Wallace Arnold Trust.

== Life ==
Born into a farming family in Wakefield, Barr gained a financial interest in vehicle touring at a young age. He alone was responsible for transforming Wallace Arnold from an early, small charabanc outfit into one of the UK's largest coach tour operators, founding the Barr & Wallace Arnold Trust in 1926, which would run the company for the next 76 years.

Barr married Edith Midgley in 1913 at age 25; they had seven children, Mary, Margaret, Robert, Veronica, Malcolm, Jean, Stewart. Barr died at age 72.
