= Wallace Arnold =

Former British motorcoach tour operator

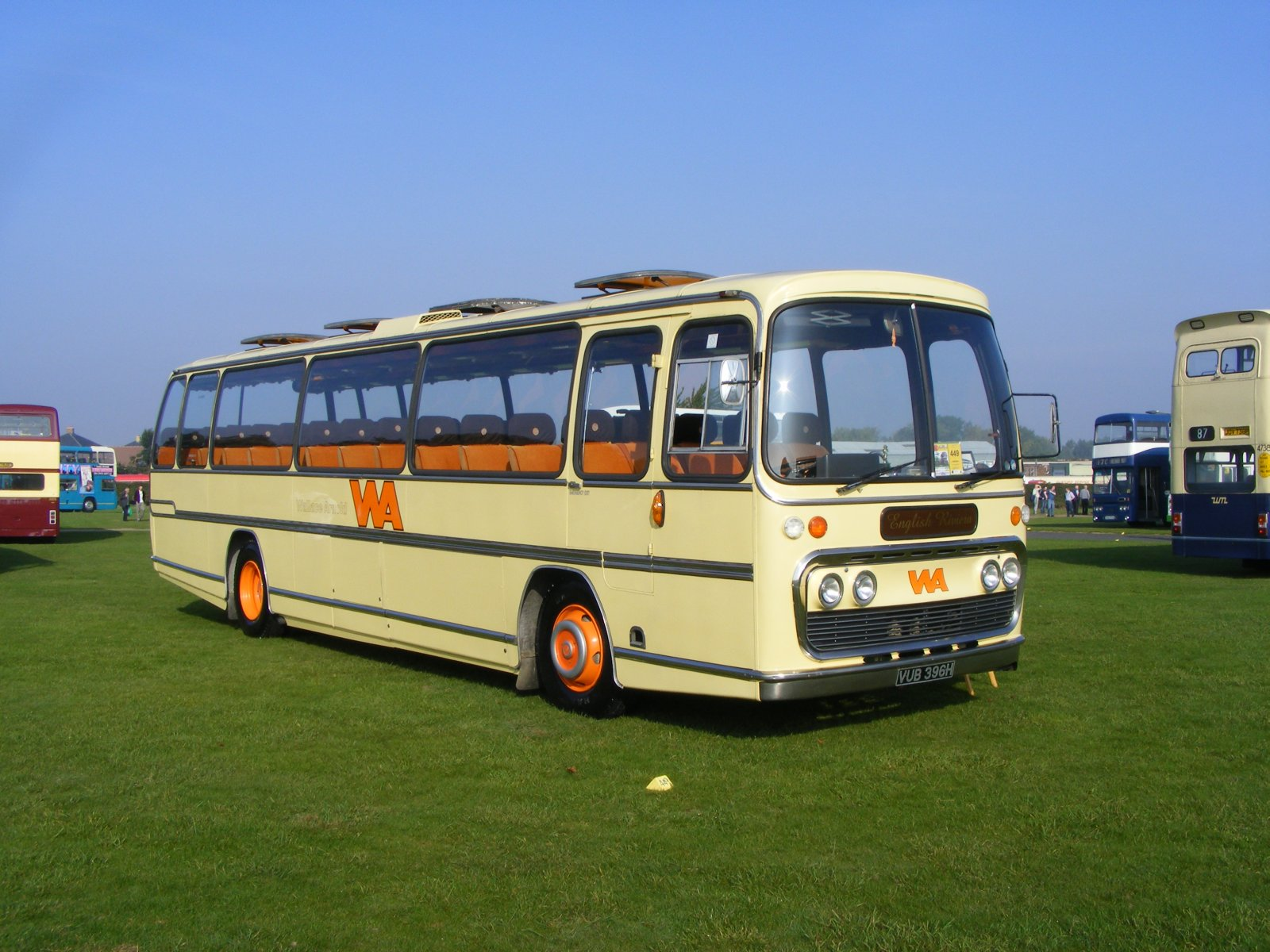
- Preserved Plaxton bodied Leyland Leopard in September 2008
- Parent: Barr & Wallace Arnold Trust (1926-1997); 3i (1997-2005); Shearings (2005-2007)
- Founded: 1912
- Defunct: 2005
- Headquarters: Leeds, West Yorkshire, England
- Service type: Coach tour operator
- Founders: Robert Barr; Wallace Cunningham; Arnold Crowe

Wallace Arnold was one of the UK's largest holiday motorcoach tour operators.

== History ==
Wallace Arnold was founded in 1912 and was named after two of its founders Wallace Cunningham and Arnold Crowe. In 1926, the Barr & Wallace Arnold Trust was founded by Robert Barr, and would continue running the company for 76 years.

After having sold its Kippax Motors and Farsley Omnibus stagecarriage operations to the Leeds Corporation in 1968, in February 1969, Wallace Arnold purchased the Evan Evans tour business in London. In the late 1970s, Wallace Arnold commenced operating express coach services under the Euroways brand to Continental Europe.

By the time that coach services were deregulated by the Transport Act 1980 in October 1980, Wallace Arnold operated 290 coaches from its headquarters in Gelderd Road, Wortley, Leeds, and also owned a subsidiary, Embankment Coaches based in Plymouth Devon. Immediately following deregulation, Wallace Arnold was a founding member of the British Coachways consortium that competed with the state-owned National Express. It left after a year and briefly ran its own service from London to Torbay.

In 1997, Wallace Arnold was sold to the multinational private equity and venture capital company 3i. This was followed in April 2005 with Wallace Arnold merging with Shearings in a £200,000,000 (equivalent to £353,685,000 in 2025) deal to become WA Shearings, claiming a 14% share of the UK coach holiday market. In 2007 the Wallace Arnold name was dropped, with the company name simplified to Shearings Holidays. The merger included eight travel shops in Yorkshire, rebranded from Wallace Arnold Travel to WA Shearings. These kept the WA Shearings name until 2010, when they reverted to their original Wallace Arnold Travel name.

== Fleet ==
Wallace Arnold was the largest operator of the Bedford VAL 3 axle coach. After becoming a large Leyland Leopard and Volvo B58 customer, in later years it standardised on Volvo B10M and Volvo B12Ms, mostly with Jonckheere and Plaxton bodies.
