= Leyland Leopard =

British mid-engined single-decker bus and coach chassis

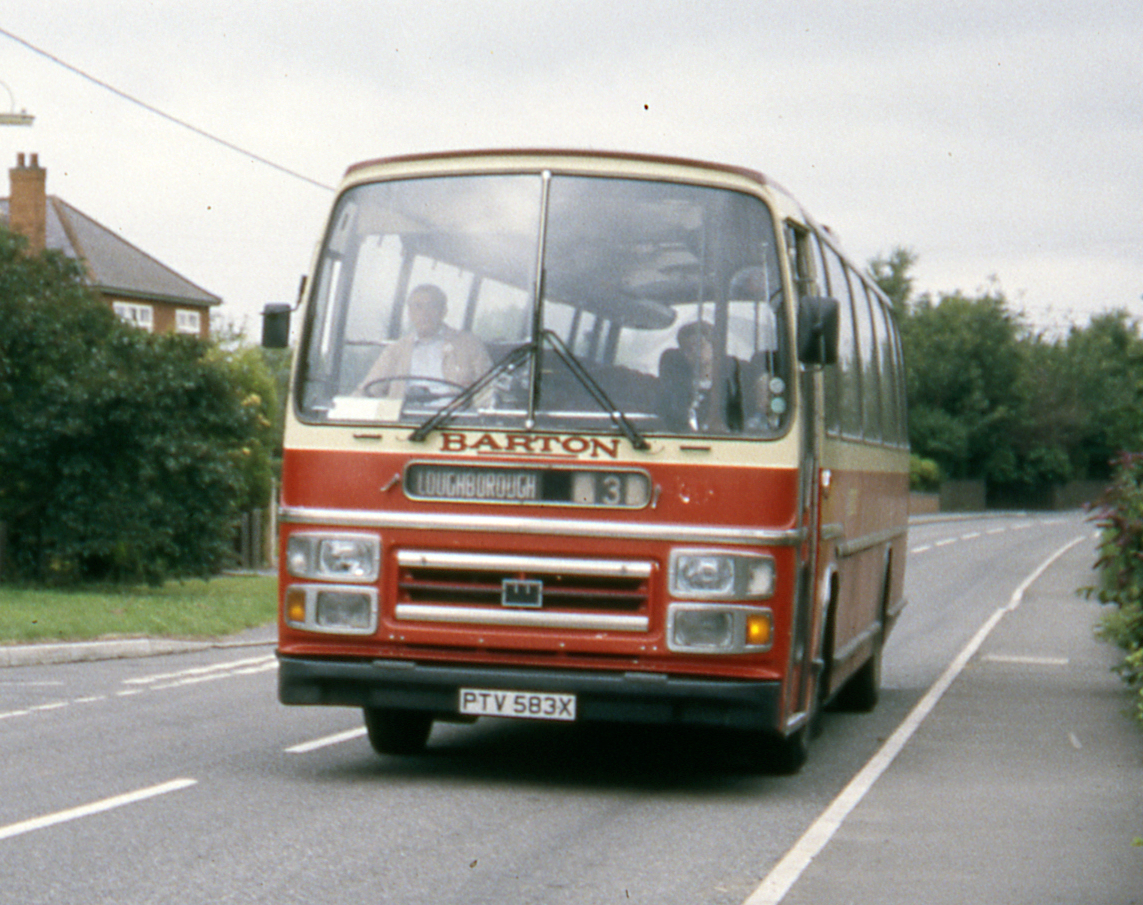
- Barton Transport Plaxton Supreme IV bodied Leyland Leopard in Long Whatton in 1989

Overview
- Manufacturer: Leyland
- Production: 1959–1982
- Assembly: Farington, England

Body and chassis
- Doors: 1, 2, or 3
- Floor type: Step entrance

Powertrain
- Engine: Leyland O.600; Leyland O.680; Leyland TL11
- Capacity: 600 cubic inches (9.8 litres); 680 cubic inches (11.1 litres)
- Transmission: Leyland manual/pneumocyclic; ZF synchromesh

Dimensions
- Length: 9.1m, 10m, 11m, and 12m
- Width: 2.5m
- Height: 3.2m and 3.5m

Chronology
- Predecessor: Leyland Tiger Cub
- Successor: Leyland Tiger

The Leyland Leopard was a mid-engined single-decker bus and single-decker coach chassis manufactured by Leyland between 1959 and 1982.

== History ==
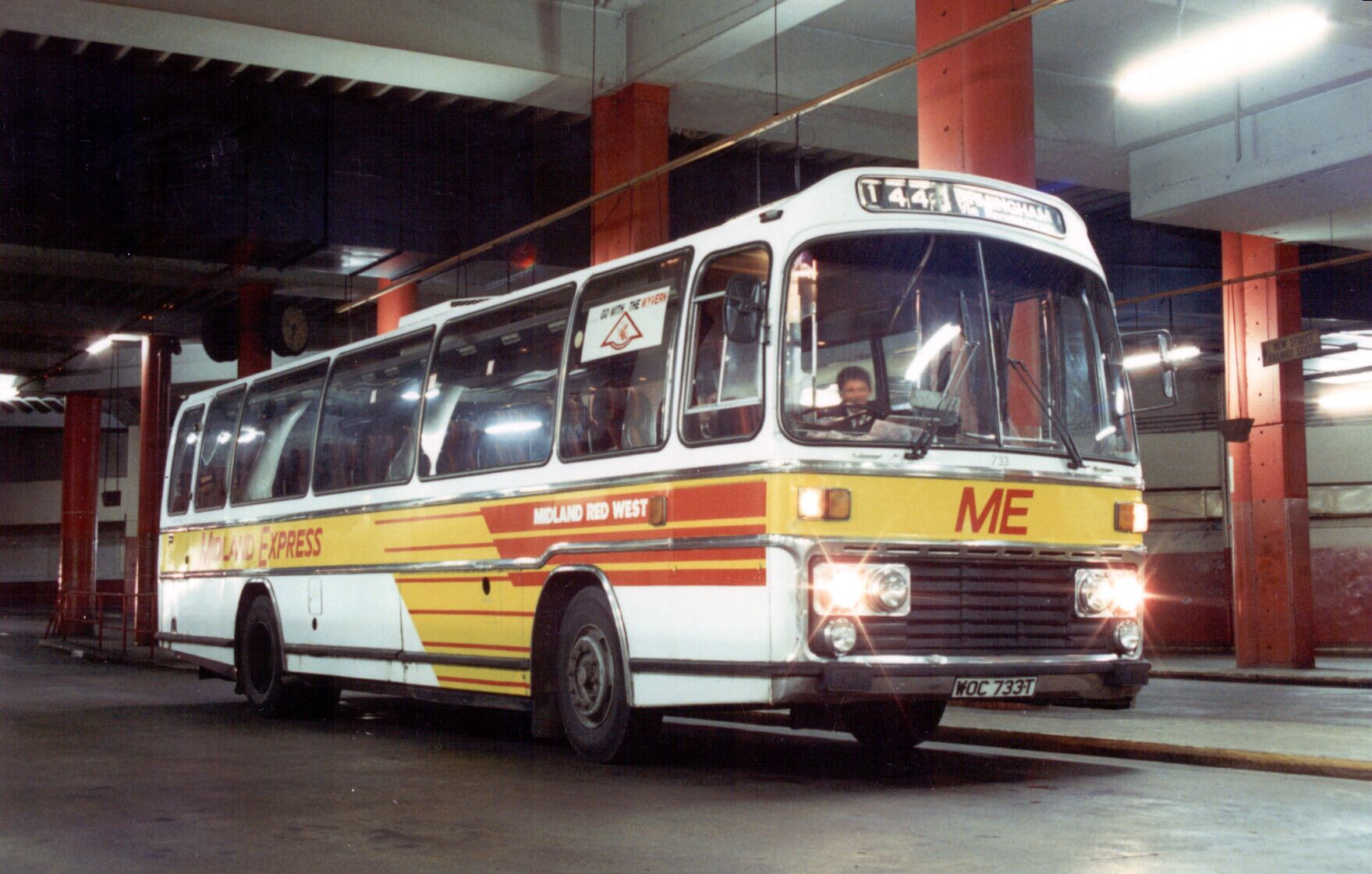
Midland Red West Plaxton bodied Leyland Leopard in March 1989

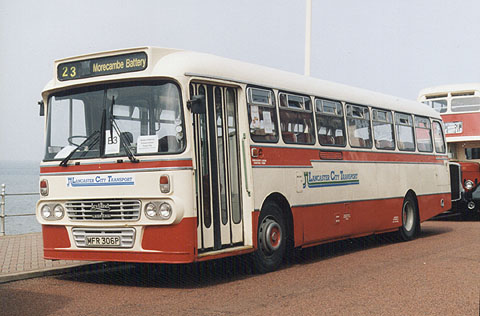
Preserved Lancaster City Transport Y type bodied Leyland Leopard in Blackpool in August 2001

The Leyland Leopard was introduced in 1959. It was developed from the Leyland Tiger Cub, one of the most important changes being the introduction of the larger and more powerful O.600 engine (later-built Leopards were fitted with the 11.1-litre O.680 engine). The Leopard was superseded by the Leyland Tiger.

== Designation ==
The original 30 ft bus version was coded L1, it was right hand drive with a 16 ft 2in wheelbase and an overall length of 29 ft 4in. The 30 ft coach was the L2 which had the same wheelbase but was an inch shorter overall, the left-hand-drive LHL1 shared the wheelbase but the overall length was 29 ft 2in. All had a swept turning circle of 68 ft.

The initial 36 ft models launched at the 1961 Scottish Motor Show at Kelvin Hall all shared an 18 ft 6in wheelbase, the PSU3.1R, PSU3.1L, PSU3.2R, and PSU3.2L bus versions had a chassis length of 35 ft 1 1/2in with a swept turning circle of 71 ft and the coaches, PSU3.3R, PSU3.3L, PSU3.4R and PSU3.4L, had a chassis length of 31 ft and a swept turning circle of 68 ft. standard Gross Vehicle Weight of the PSU3 was 11 1/4 tons but a 13-ton GVW was optional.

As at May 1964 all Leopards had the O:600 engine and only the longer versions (.2 and .4) could be had with Pneumocyclic transmission.

== Later variants ==
In 1966 the LHL1, L1 and L2 models (and the Royal Tiger Cub) were replaced by the Leopard PSU4 series which had a similar chassis and axles to the PSU3, the coach versions having a shorter frame rather than the drop frame extension of the L2. They were preceded by C-class buses for Córas Iompair Éireann which were to the same length as the PSU4 but coded PSU3.4R.

From 1968 Leyland introduced the A suffix across all existing passenger models, this denoted the rationalised Pnuemocyclic gearbox when fitted: this replaced various AEC and Leyland epicyclic transmissions and included a ten-speed splitter version offered in the Super Beaver articulated lorry. This was built in a new extension to the Farington works. All PSU4A and PSU3A Leopards had the larger O.680 engine.

New passenger models did not get the suffix so the 20 ft wheelbase version announced in 1968 was the PSU5.4R. The first was delivered to Córas Iompair Éireann. Differences from the PSU3A and 4A included the option of a ten-speed splitter gearbox with wide ratio five speed standard, a Worldmaster front axle and a Maudslay rear axle.

From December 1970, shorter Leopards were altered to conform with the PSU5, resulting in a change to the B-suffix, these changes also applied to the last Panthers.

Scottish Bus Group continued to take the manual-gearbox Leopard with O.600 engine until that was discontinued in 1972/3. The O.680 powered Leopards with the Leyland part-synchromesh gearbox that succeeded the O.600 were still coded PSU3.3R

Late in 1974 spring-operated parking brakes, automatic brake adjusters, a water-cooled air compressor and a revised engine mounting resulted in a change to PSU3C, PSU4C and PSU5A. Leyland ceased making a manual gearbox for the Leopard and a version with ZF S4-60 gearbox and otherwise up to date chassis specification was sold as an alternative to the Scottish Bus Group as the PSU3C.3R.

During 1976 springs and axles were uprated and the close-ratio version of the five speed Pneumocyclic became standard; this applied to the PSU3D, PSU4D and PSU5B.

A forthcoming change in crashworthiness regulations caused the air-brake chambers to be re-sited during 1977, leading to the PSU3E, 4E and 5C.

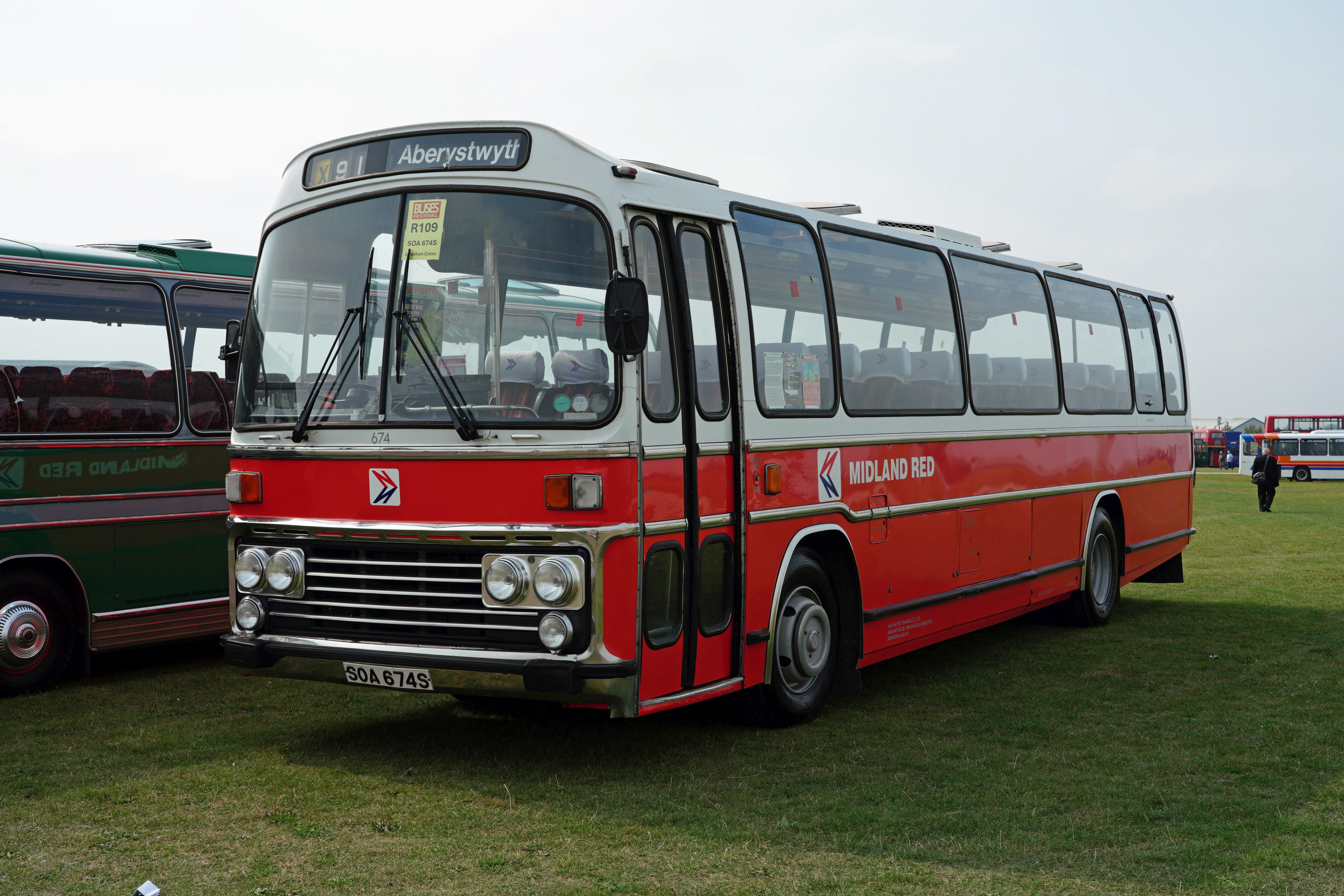
Preserved Midland Red Leyland Leopard Plaxton Supreme III at Sywell Aerodrome in September 2024

In 1979 the twentieth year of Leopard production, the tyre equipment and coolant warning system were revised, the wide ratio Pneumocyclic with direct air operation again became standard and the ZF S6-80 six-speed synchromesh became a general sale option on coach chassis designated by .5: these were the PSU4F, PSU3F and PSU5D

In 1982 with the TL11-powered Tiger already launched, the PSU4G, 3G and 5E had a rationalised O.680 which shared TL11 components.

== Operators ==
In England, sizeable Leopard fleets were built up by various National Bus Company subsidiaries, including Birmingham & Midland Omnibus Company. BET Group subsidiaries were major customers for Leopards. For buses and dual-purpose vehicles, a BET standard design of bodywork was produced, primarily by Marshall and Willowbrook but also to a lesser extent by Weymann and Metro-Cammell. Another major English customer for the Leyland Leopard was Barton Transport of Chilwell near Nottingham, which built up a fleet of 200 with Plaxton Elite and Supreme coach bodywork. Unusually for a large operator, Barton standardised on this type of vehicle for all types of work including local stage carriage services; for this reason, all were fitted with a wide two-piece door, known as an "express" or a "grant" door. The latter term refers to the New Bus Grant, whereby the British Government paid part of the cost of a new bus providing it met certain specifications and spent a prescribed proportion of its time on local service work. Many other operators took advantage of this and bought Leopards built to the grant specification.

In Scotland, many were bought by subsidiaries of the Scottish Bus Group and were mostly bodied by Alexander with the Y type body, as both buses and coaches. The Irish company CIÉ also bought a substantial fleet, mainly with bodywork built in its own workshops, as did its Northern Irish counterpart the UTA and its successor Ulsterbus, which bought bodies manufactured by Alexander (Belfast). The Leopard was extremely common on Northern Irish roads for over 40 years, with the first one arriving in 1965 and the last one in 1984. During this period a total of 1,500 Leopards were built. Throughout the 30 years of The Troubles in Northern Ireland, a total of 228 Leopards were stolen from their depots and maliciously destroyed in public streets. In 2006, all Leopards were withdrawn from public service, with some having clocked up 28 years of service. In the 1980s, Ulsterbus shortened a few of its Leopards for use as towbuses.

Leyland Leopards also saw use with the British Military, and were exported to many other countries. Although the vast majority were used as buses or coaches, a few were bodied as pantechnicons, and at least one as a car transporter. The Leopard was popular with National Express operators.

== Exports ==
=== Australia ===
The Leopard was also popular with Australian operators. The Public Transport Commission purchased 745 for use in Sydney and Newcastle between 1967 and 1976 giving it the world's largest Leopard fleet.

Long standing Leopards purchasers into the 1980s included North & Western Bus Lines, Punchbowl Bus Company and Ventura Bus Lines. In the early 1990s, a number of Leopards were rebodied. This was to take advantage of a loophole that allowed rebodied buses in New South Wales to be classified as new buses for fleet average purposes, the loophole was later closed and the practice ceased.

=== New Zealand ===
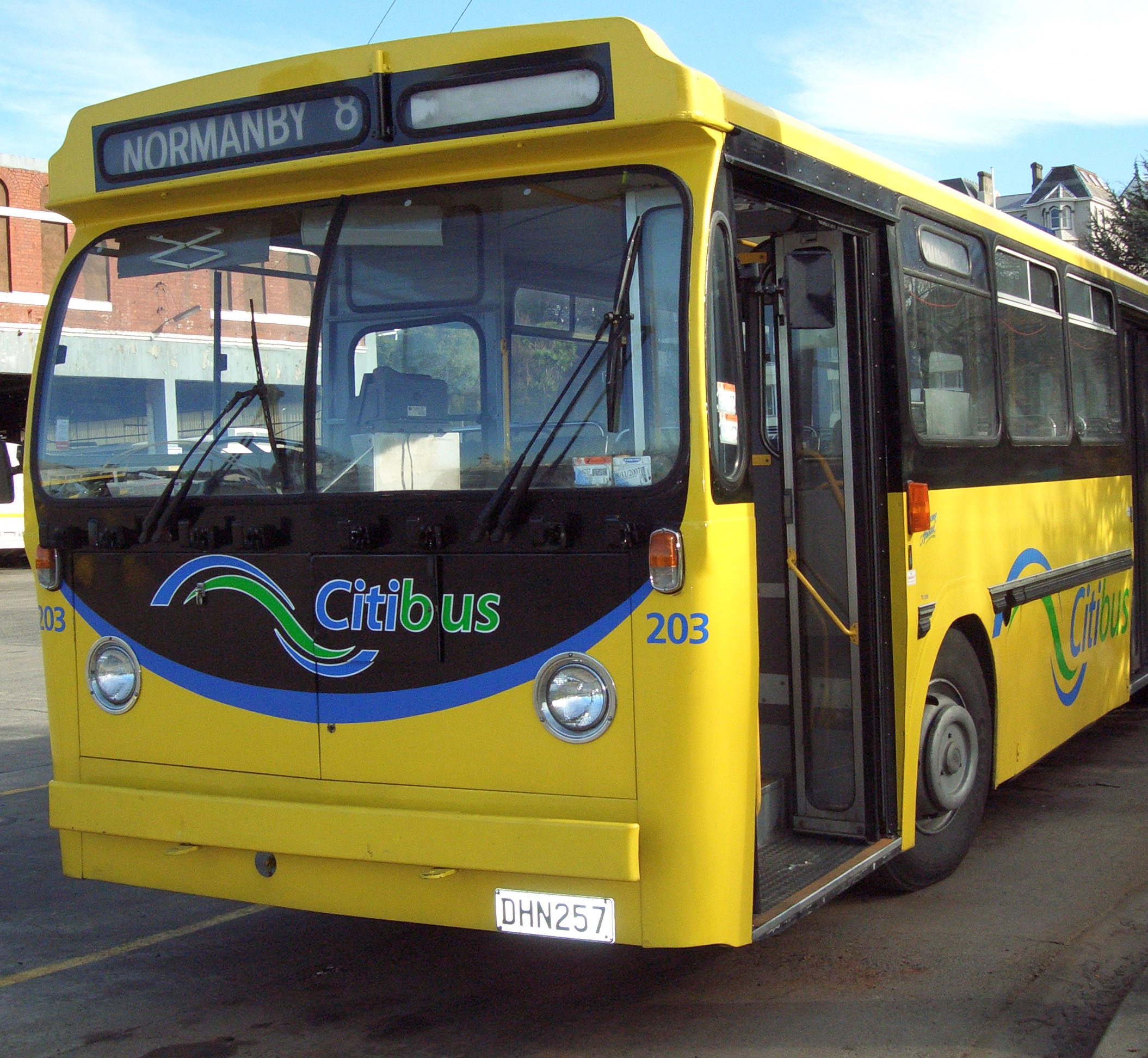
Citibus New Zealand Motor Bodies bodied Leyland Leopard in Dunedin, New Zealand in September 2007

Leyland Leopards were popular with several municipal operators in the 1970s and 80s. These included:

- Dunedin City Transport - 40 vehicles
- Gisborne City Council - 2 vehicles
- Invercargill City Council - 10 vehicles
- New Plymouth City Transport - 6 Vehicles
- Palmerston North City Buses - 1 vehicle
- Wellington City Transport - 94 vehicles

In 1980, Auckland tour operator Bonnici Coachlines purchased ten 12.5 metre three-axle Leopard coaches.

=== Singapore ===
In 1979, Leyland delivered a single Leyland Leopard diverted from an order by Jones Omnibus Services in Aberbeeg to Singapore Bus Service (SBS) in hopes for large-scale orders from SBS. Bodied by Walter Alexander Coachbuilders and registered as SBS6791L, it was an early example of the mid-engine bus in Singapore, preceding even the much larger orders of the Volvo B10M in the 1990s. Despite favourable reviews from SBS, no further units were purchased and SBS6791L was returned to the UK and sold to Woods of Mirfield, West Yorkshire.

== Competitors ==
The Leyland Leopard's major direct competitor throughout most of its life was the AEC Reliance, even though AEC was a subsidiary of Leyland for a large proportion of that time. In the 1970s, the Volvo B58 became a serious competitor. There was also some competition for the Leopard from lighter weight chassis such as the Bedford VAL and Y-series.
