= Volvo B58 =

Swedish bus and coach chassis

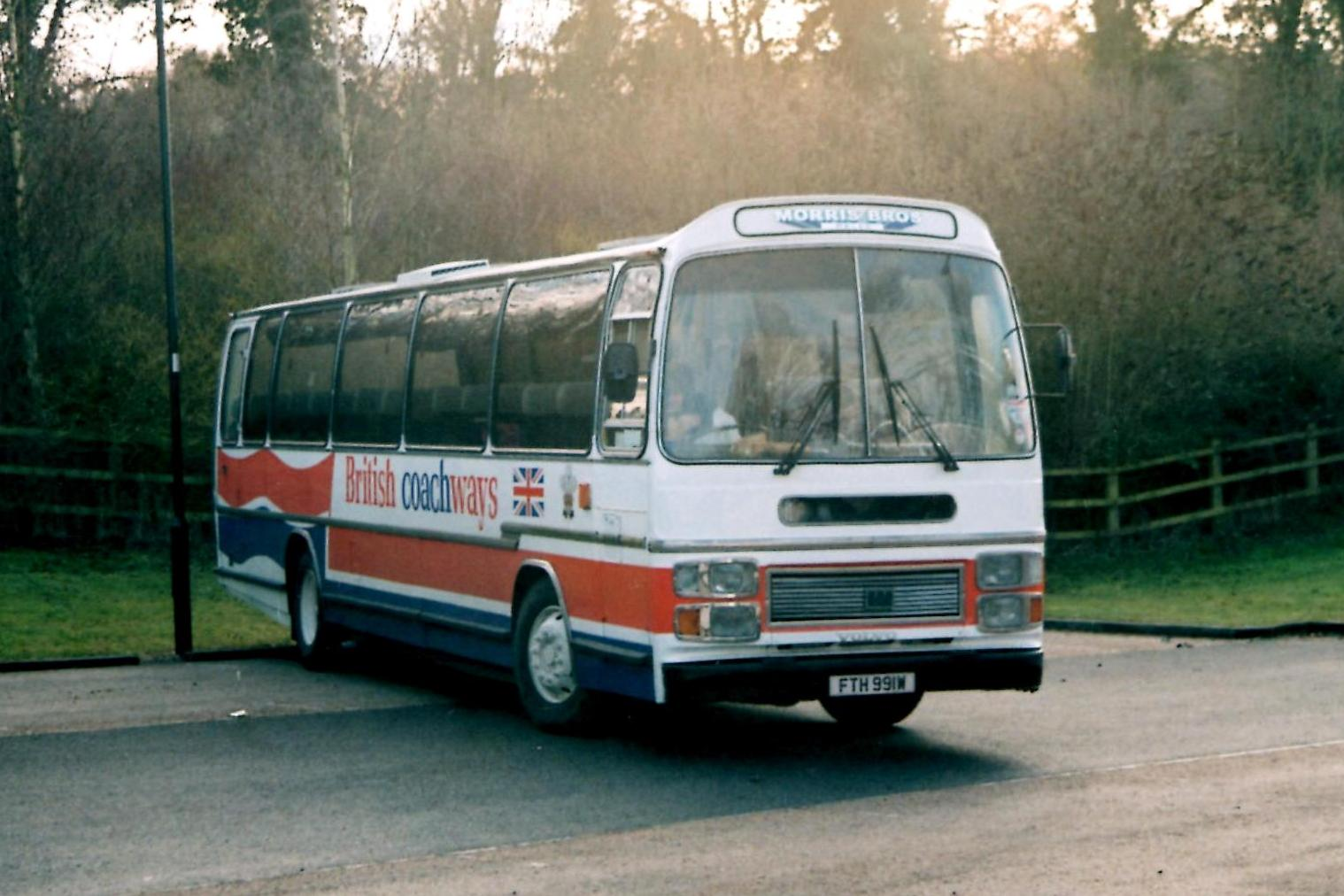
- Preserved former British Coachways Plaxton Supreme IV bodied Volvo B58 coach in January 2011

Overview
- Manufacturer: Volvo
- Production: 1966–1982 Sweden; 1979-1998 Brazil
- Assembly: Sweden

Body and chassis
- Class: Bus chassis Coach chassis
- Body style: Single-decker bus Single-decker coach Single-decker articulated bus Double-decker bus
- Doors: 1-3
- Floor type: Step-entrance

Powertrain
- Engine: 9.6-litre horizontally mid-mounted I-6; Volvo HD100, THD100
- Capacity: 28 to 67 seated

Dimensions
- Length: 9.5m to 18.0m
- Width: 2.52m
- Height: 3.0m or 4.2m

Chronology
- Predecessor: Volvo B755
- Successor: Volvo B10M

The Volvo B58 is a retired mid-engined bus chassis manufactured by Volvo in Sweden from 1966 until early 1982. It was succeeded by the B10M.

== Operators ==
=== Australia ===
In Australia the B58 was popular with government operators. ACTION, placed 77 in service between 1972 and 1976, the Metropolitan Transport Trust, Tasmania 68 rigid buses and three articulated buses from September 1975, and the State Transport Authority, Adelaide 65 rigids and 35 articulateds from April 1980.

The chassis also found a market with Australian private operators. Forest Coach Lines purchased 13 between 1972 and 1984, Busways 30 between 1978 and 1981, and Grenda Corporation 18 between 1980 and 1983. All supplemented their fleets with second-hand purchases.

=== Brazil ===
In Brazil, the Volvo B58 (named the B58E and modernized with the B10M transmission and suspension) was built in Curitiba from 1979 to 1998. It was used for city buses, including trolleybuses, and road coaches, in cities like São Paulo, Curitiba, Porto Alegre, Campinas, Sorocaba and Belo Horizonte. Also, in 1992, B58E was Brazil's first bi-articulated chassis, and the first 33 operated in Curitiba as Express Line Buses.

=== New Zealand ===
Between 1981 and November 2009, 68 Volvo B58 trolleybuses operated in Wellington. Originally purchased by Wellington City Transport, their final operator was GO Wellington.

Between 1980 and 1991, New Plymouth City Council's bus fleet also operated 4 vehicles featuring Hess bodywork built under licence in New Zealand.

=== Sweden ===
In 1978, the Greater Stockholm Transport Authority ordered 250 B58s.

=== United Kingdom ===
In the United Kingdom, it was sold to many major operators including Wallace Arnold and Park's of Hamilton from 1972. Many of the Volvo B58s in the United Kingdom were built as coaches. One Volvo B58 was rebodied as a double-decker bus with East Lancs Droop Nose double-decker bus body for Skills Coaches.

=== Uruguay ===
Chassis of this model of Brazilian origin were built by the companies Caio, Ciferal and Thamco to be sent to Montevideo, Uruguay both before and after the launch of the "National Renewal Plan" of the fleet for the companies CUTCSA, COETC, UCOT and Raincoop. CUTCSA acquired some 260 (10 in 1990, 18 in 1991 before the "National Plan for Fleet Renewal" that were built by CUTCSA itself in Uruguay, 175 after its launch in 1993 and 57 in 1994) buses with CAIO Vitória bodywork that would be radiated between 2008 (one of these chassis had its engine removed and used in a Brill Model 60 as a replacement for the Cummins diesel engine used in the 1960s as a replacement of its original gasoline engine it had) and 2015 when the ex-UCOT units acquired in 2002. COETC acquired a total of 153 vehicles with Ciferal Padron Rio bodywork(two batches of 14 and 38 buses in 1992, 83 in 1993, 6 in 1994 and 5 in 1996) that were in service between 2008 and 2022. UCOT acquired 118 chassis with CAIO Vitória bodies (in a total renewal of the fleet); they were taken out of service and distributed to multiple destinations between 2001 (these buses would all be sold to CUTCSA or Raincoop) and 2012, keeping some as substitutes. Raincoop acquired 91 buses with CAIO Vitória bodies (15 for suburban use between 1992 and 1993, 15 urban in 1992, 55 urban in 1993 and 6 urban ones in 1994); these were maintained until 2011 when they were taken out of service in a fleet renewal completed in 2012 with some ex-UCOT acquired in 2002. Remaining in the company until its closure in 2016, in 1993 some 18 B58E chassis were built for Raincoop by Thamco in the Scorpion TH3250USS model that would be discontinued between 2008 and the cooperative's closure in 2016 with bus 100 passing into the hands of Erhitran (association dedicated to the conservation of the heritage of the Uruguayan bus). Raincoop acquired a final chassis of this model in 1998 for its suburban lines with a Marcopolo Allegro GV body.

Two companies from the interior of Uruguay acquired a chassis of this model for urban and suburban use, these being Olivera Hnos. from Maldonado, who bought 10 units for bodywork with CAIO Vitória bodywork that would pass into the hands of CODESA in their merger. In the city of Las Piedras of the Canelones Department the company CODET acquired 11 with CAIO Vitória "Intercity" bodywork in 1992 and another 10 in 1993 with two additional acquisitions of second-hand vehicles from Solfy SA, these being 2 Marcopolo Allegro G4 in 1997 and 4 Marcopolo Allegro GV in 1998 with all of them becoming the property of COETC on August 1, 2007, with the merger between both companies resulting in these vehicles being deactivated between 2008 and 2011. The interdepartmental company CITA SA also had vehicles with a Volvo B58E chassis, with the last one ceasing services in 2018.
