= DAF MB200 =

- Plaxton Paramount bodied DAF MB200 in Chester in July 2007

Overview
- Manufacturer: DAF
- Production: 1965 -
- Assembly: Eindhoven, Netherlands

Body and chassis
- Doors: 1
- Floor type: Step entrance

Powertrain
- Transmission: ZF

Chronology
- Successor: DAF MB230

The DAF MB200 was a mid-underfloor-engined coach/bus chassis produced by DAF in Eindhoven, The Netherlands, during the 1970s and 1980s. It was fitted with a DAF 11.6 litre diesel engine and ZF transmission, in either manual or automatic styles.

The first of over 600 was imported to the United Kingdom in 1975, at a time when continental-manufactured buses and coaches were still relatively uncommon. An articulated version was bodied in Australia by Austral for Brisbane Transport in 1985.

During the mid-1980s, the MB200 was superseded by the MB230, which continued in production until 1993.
