= Leyland Tiger =

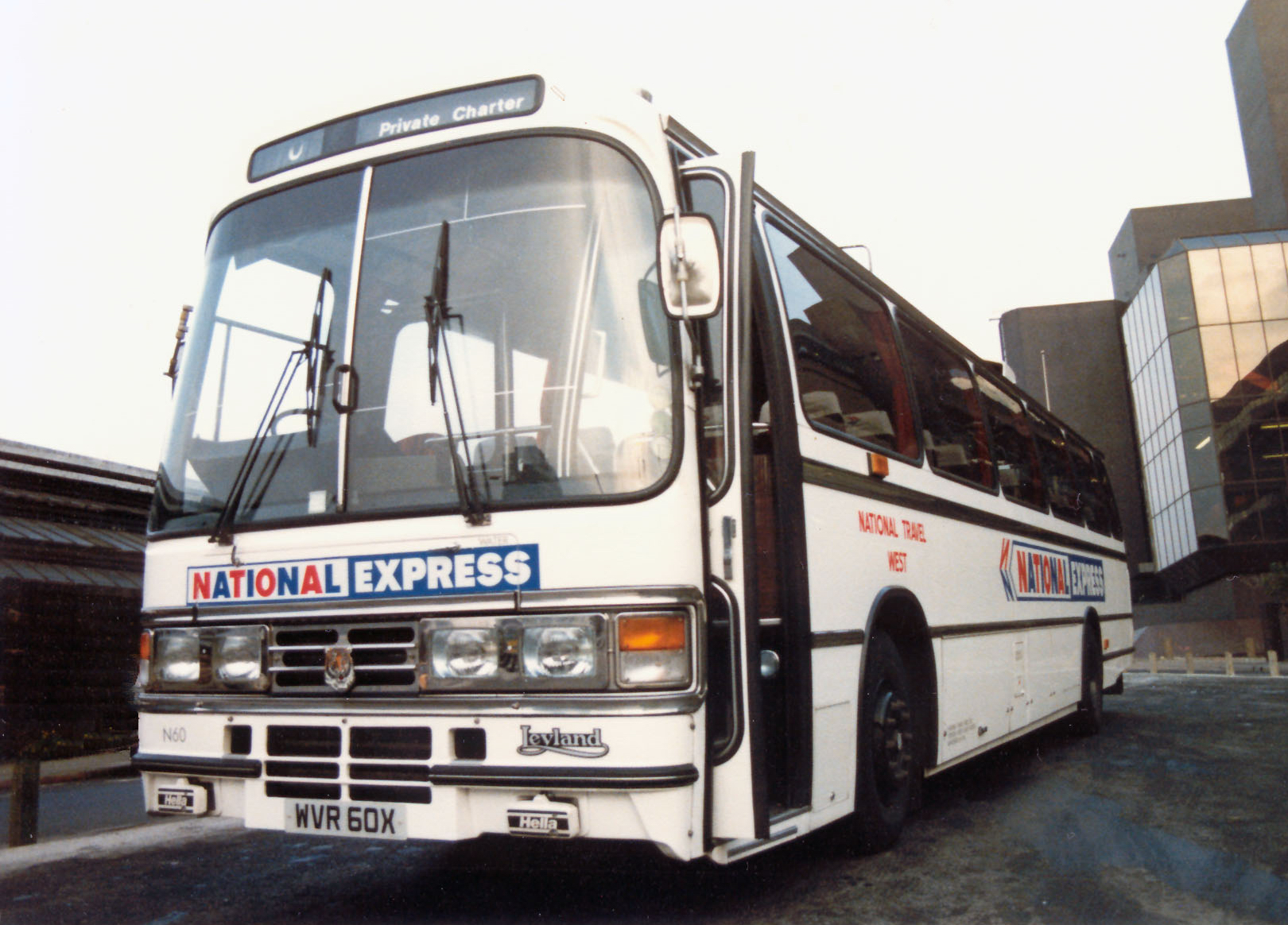
- National Express Duple Dominant bodied Leyland Tiger in 1982

Overview
- Manufacturer: Leyland
- Production: 1981–1992

Body and chassis
- Doors: 1 - 2
- Floor type: Step entrance

Powertrain
- Engine: Leyland TL11; Gardner 6HLXCT; Cummins L10; Volvo THD100
- Power output: 170 - 260BHP (TL11) 220 - 290 BHP (Cummins L10)
- Transmission: Leyland; Voith; ZF

Chronology
- Predecessor: Leyland Leopard
- Successor: Volvo B10M

The Leyland Tiger, also known as the B43, was a mid-engined bus and coach chassis manufactured by Leyland between 1981 and 1992. This name had previously been used for a front-engined bus built between 1927 and 1968. It replaced the Leyland Leopard, which had been in production for over 20 years.

== History ==
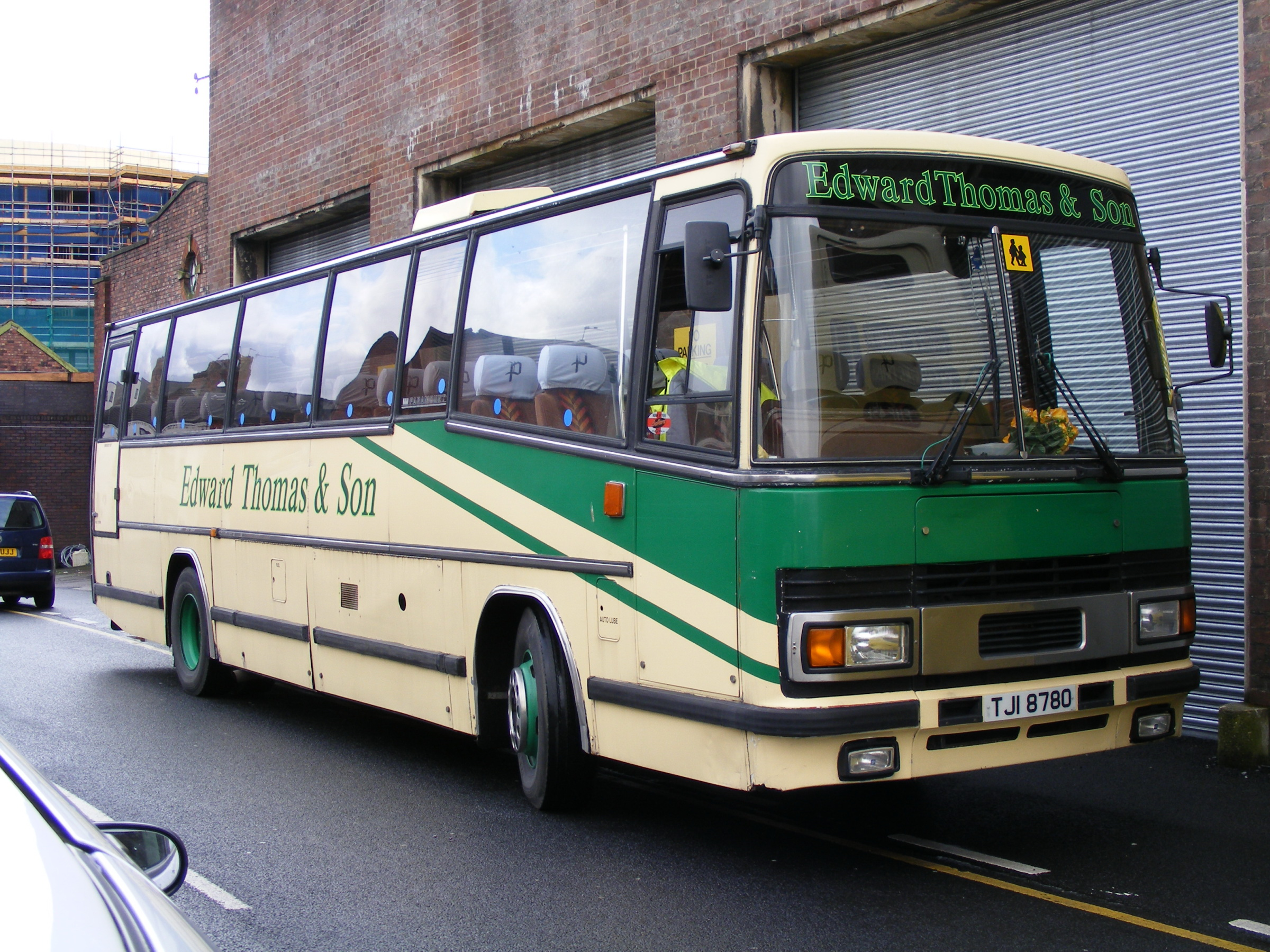
Edward Thomas & Son Plaxton Paramount bodied Tiger

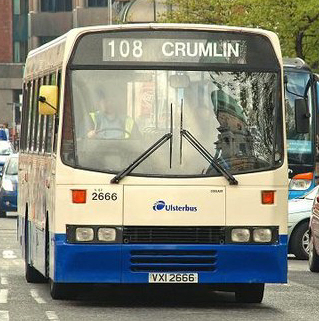
Ulsterbus Alexander Q-Type bodied Tiger in Belfast in April 2009

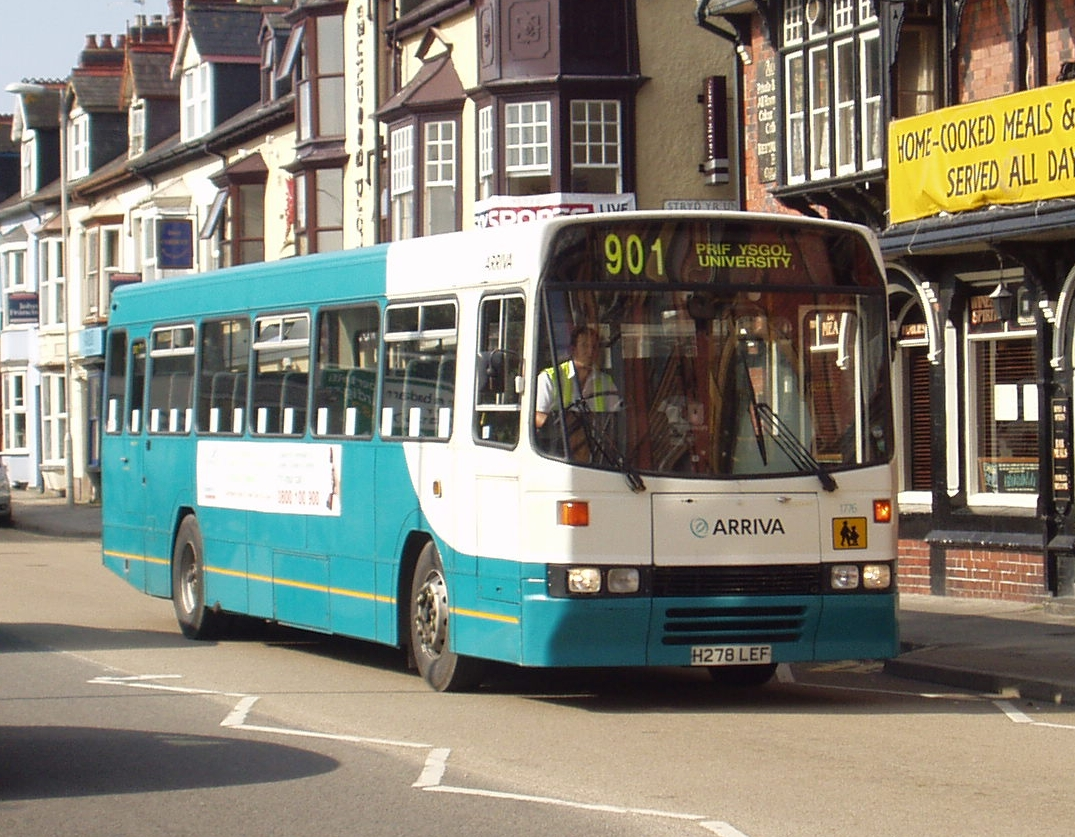
Arriva Buses Wales Alexander Q-Type bodied Tiger in Aberystwyth in September 2008

The Leyland Tiger was released in 1981. Initially, only one engine was offered, the turbocharged Leyland TL11, which could be rated up to 260 hp. The Leopard had enjoyed huge success as a bus in Scotland, usually with the Alexander Y-type body, but had lost some Scottish Bus Group orders to Seddon's Pennine 7, owing to Leyland's unwillingness to offer a Gardner engine in the Leopard.

When Leyland launched the Tiger, it continued this same unwillingness, just as Dennis was developing the Gardner-engined Dennis Dorchester, which similarly had the potential to win Scottish Bus Group orders away from the Tiger. Faced with this possibility, Leyland offered Gardner 6HLX-series engines in the Tiger from 1984. To facilitate this, the Tiger chassis had to be modified, as the Gardner engine was significantly larger than the TL11. Although the threat from the Dorchester was successfully warded off, there proved to be a limited market for the Gardner-engined Tiger outside of Scottish Bus Group.

The Cummins L10 engine was also made an option by 1987. The Cummins engine was being specified more often from around 1988, and with this engine, the gearbox would usually be a ZF as opposed to the Leyland Hydracyclic.

Volvo took over Leyland in 1988, and from 1989 the Tiger was offered with the Volvo THD100-series engine (as fitted in the best-selling B10M). The large majority of Volvo-engined Tigers went to Northern Ireland. At around this time, the TL11 and Gardner options were dropped, leaving only the Cummins and Volvo options available.

Like the Leopard, the Tiger was also sold as a bus. Usually, it would have a downrated engine, and leaf springs in place of the standard air suspension.

== Operators ==
The Scottish Bus Group bought batches of Tigers usually with Alexander TS-type bodywork and Gardner 6HLXCT engines. It was also popular with National Bus Company subsidiaries. Shearings purchased many Tigers for use as coaches.

The Tiger also proved to be very popular in Northern Ireland, with Ulsterbus and Citybus purchasing 747 between 1983 and 1993. The last Tiger to enter service did so in Northern Ireland in August 1993.

== Exports ==
The Tiger was popular in Australia. The biggest customer for the Tiger was Ventura Bus Lines, Melbourne who purchased 65 Tigers over a five-year period from March 1984, as well as a few more second-hand. Another large purchaser was North & Western Bus Lines, Sydney. Premier Illawarra, Wollongong, Rover Motors, Cessnock, Surfside Buslines, Gold Coast and Thompsons Bus Service, Brisbane all built up large fleets of new and second hand Tigers. A number of three-axle chassis were bodied as coaches. The last Tiger to be bodied in Australia had been imported in 1984, but it was not until 1993 that its owner, Bass Hill Bus Service, had it bodied.

== Articulated version ==
One articulated chassis was manufactured in 1985. It took two years to find a buyer, being purchased by Wests National Coaches, Nambour, Australia and bodied by Superior in June 1987.

== Volvo ownership ==
Leyland Bus was acquired in a management buyout led by Ian McKinnon in January 1987, and it looked like the Tiger would continue as before. Just over 12 months later, in March 1988, Volvo purchased the business, bringing the United Kingdom's two best-selling coaches, the Leyland Tiger and Volvo B10M, under common ownership. Volvo was aware that Leyland had a loyal following, and that the Tiger had a good reputation, and so the Tiger continued.

Despite accounting for 50% of all UK bus sales in February 1989, sales slowed and in 1990 in an attempt to shift stock, Volvo had Plaxton body forty chassis. Twenty-five of these bodies were the only Plaxton 321 bodies built, this being the Plaxton derivative of the Duple 320 body acquired when Duple closed.

Volvo acknowledged that the Tiger and B10M were broadly similar, and whereas Leyland had sold 3,500 Tigers since the model's launch, Volvo had sold 20,000 B10Ms during the same period. The penultimate major buyer of the Tiger, Shearings, switched to the B10M in 1991, and Volvo decided to cease production and close the factory at Farington.
