= AEC Regal IV =

British underfloor engined bus chassis

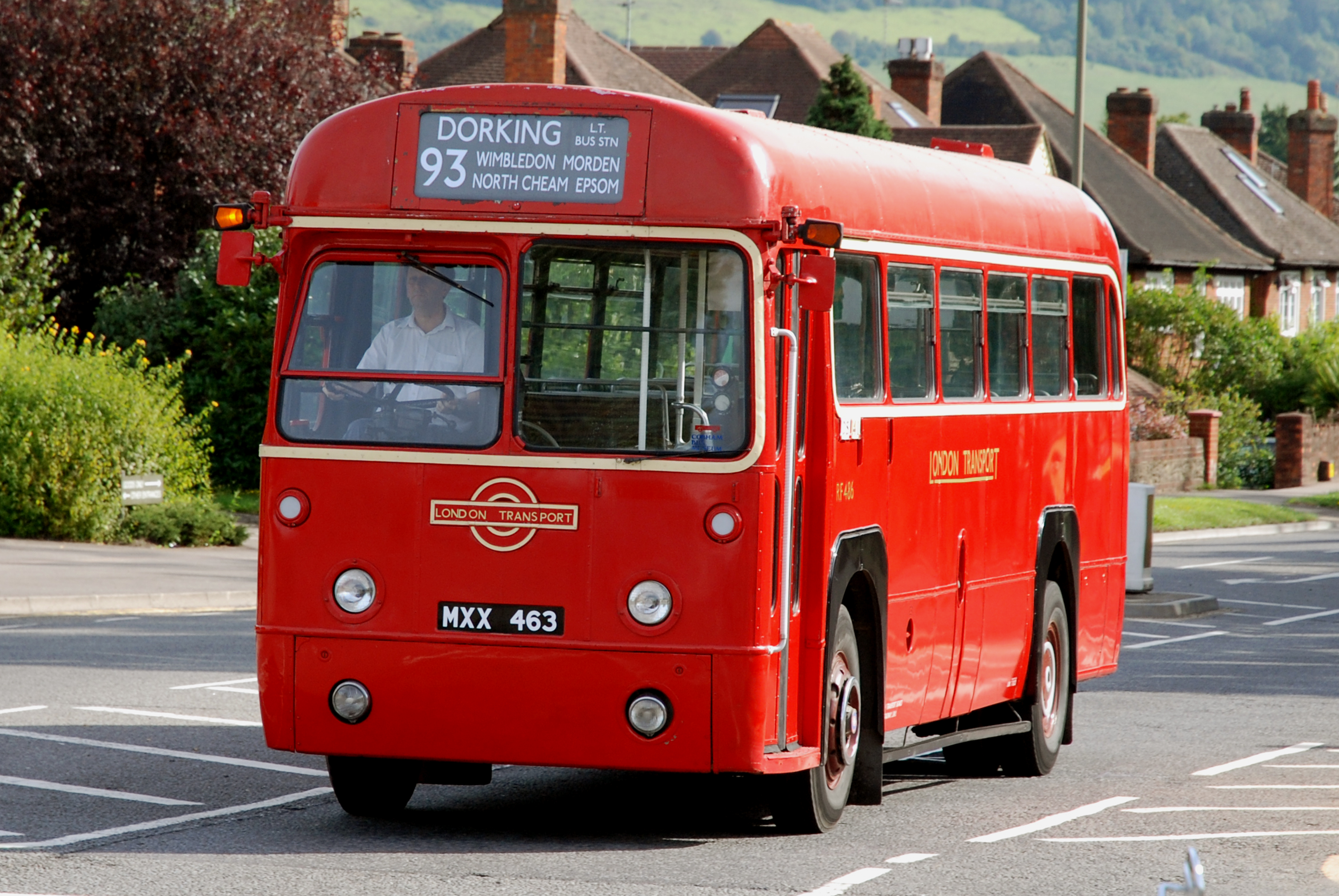
- Preserved London Transport Metro-Cammell bodied AEC Regal IV

Overview
- Manufacturer: AEC
- Production: 1949–1962
- Assembly: Southall, England

Body and chassis
- Doors: 1–3
- Floor type: Step entrance

Chronology
- Successor: AEC Reliance

The AEC Regal IV was a bus chassis manufactured by AEC from 1949 to 1962.

== History ==
The AEC Regal IV was AEC's first mainstream underfloor engined vehicle. A prototype was built in 1949, before production commenced in 1952. The first 25 were built to the maximum permissible length of 8.4 metres (28 ft) for London Transport before maximum length for PSVs increased to 9.1 metres (30 ft).

Over 2,600 were built, London Transport was the largest operator, purchasing over 700, while British European Airways purchased 64 as coaches. Production for UK market finished in 1955 with the introduction of the AEC Reliance but it remained in production for export markets until the 1960s.

== Exports ==
=== New Zealand ===
At least 117 Regal IV vehicles were exported to New Zealand between 1952 and 1955. For Christchurch and New Plymouth, these were specifically to replace the city's tram networks. These included:

- Auckland Regional Authority - 12 vehicles
- Christchurch Transport Board - 95 vehicles
- New Plymouth City Transport - 10 vehicles
- Otago Road Services - 1 vehicle

=== Spain ===
- Alsa (bus company) - 2 vehicles
