= Alexander Y Type =

Step-entrance coach and bus bodywork

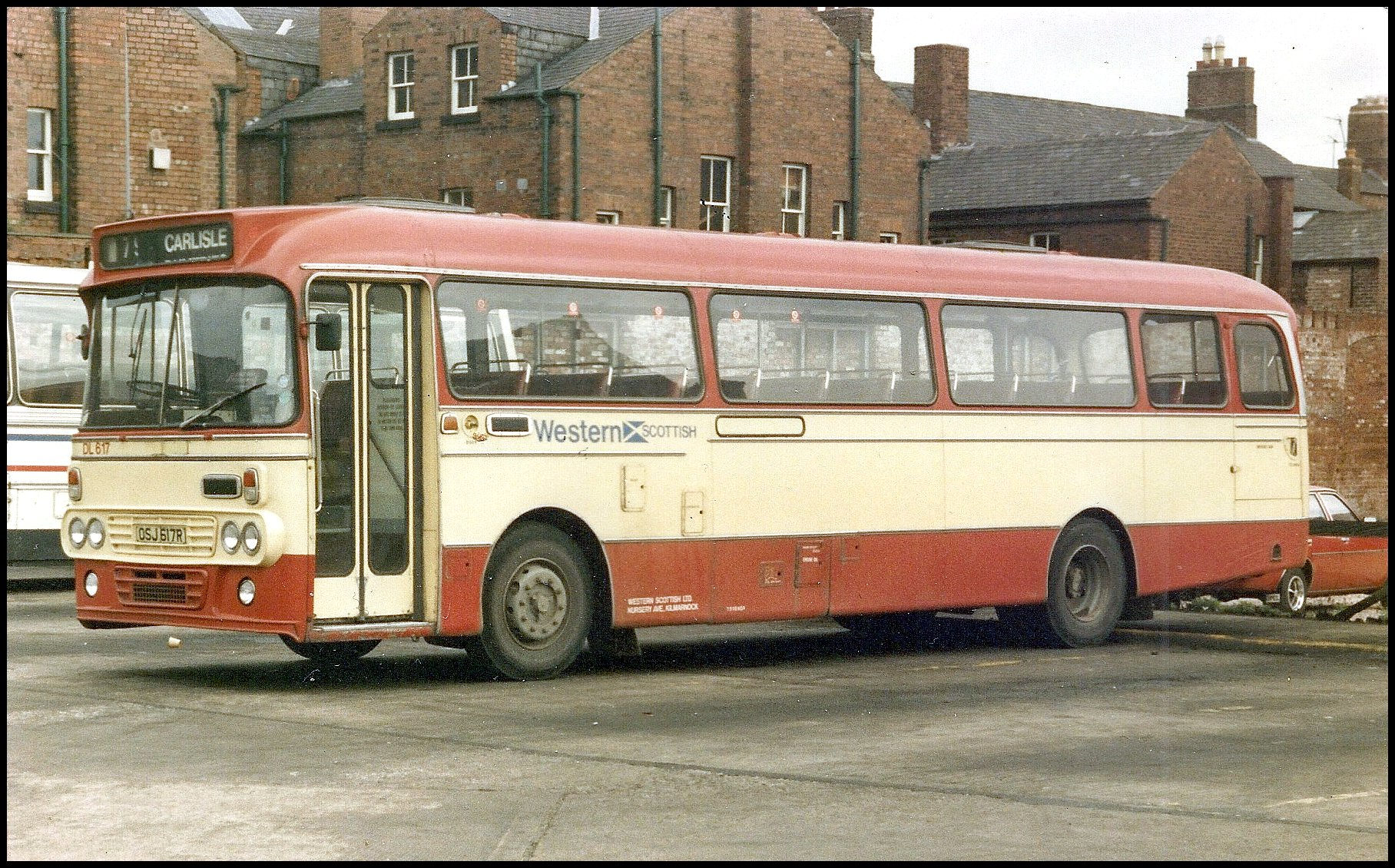
- SBG Western Scottish Alexander Y Type bodied Leyland Leopard in Carlisle

Overview
- Manufacturer: Alexander
- Production: 1962–1983
- Assembly: Falkirk, Scotland

Body and chassis
- Doors: 1 door
- Floor type: Step entrance
- Chassis: AEC Reliance; Albion Viking; Bedford VAM; Bedford Y series; Bristol LH; Bristol RE; Dennis Lancet; Ford R-Series; Leyland Leopard; Leyland Panther; Leyland Tiger Cub; Seddon Pennine 7; Volvo B57; Volvo B58

Dimensions
- Length: 10.0–12.0 metres (32.8–39.4 ft)
- Width: 2.5 metres (8 ft 2 in)
- Height: 3.0 metres (9.8 ft)

The Alexander Y Type was a long-running design of single-decker bus and single-decker intercity bus bodywork built by Walter Alexander Coachbuilders in Falkirk, Scotland. It was built on a wide range of chassis between 1962 and 1983. A small number were built at Alexander's Belfast subsidiary.

From 1971, it became the AY Type (with the A signifying alloy construction) or AYS Type (with the S signifying service bus specification), although in common usage all are referred to simply as Y Type.

The Alexander Y Type was replaced by the P Type single-deck bus body in 1983, assembled with a light aluminium frame on the Dennis Lancet, Leyland Leopard, Leyland Tiger, Scania K92CRB and Volvo B10M chassis. After securing a handful of orders, including those from some SBG companies in the lead-up to bus deregulation in Great Britain, the P Type was replaced in 1988 by the ultimately more successful PS Type.

== Chassis ==
The majority of Y Type bodies were fitted to Leyland Leopard chassis, and most were built for the Scottish Bus Group and its predecessors.

Chassis	Approximate number of bodies	Number for SBG and predecessors	Notes
Leyland Leopard	1803	1550	PSU3 and PSU4 models
AEC Reliance	330	238	
Seddon Pennine 7	284	284	
Ford R-Series	244	242	R192, R226, R1014 and R1114 models
Albion Viking	230	228	VK41, VK43 and VK49 models
Bristol RE	128	66	RELH, RELL and RESL models
Bedford Y series	92	81	YRQ and YRT models
Bristol LH	75	75	LH6P model
Leyland Tiger Cub	52	31	
Bedford VAM	27	27	VAM5 model
Leyland Panther	2	0	for Newcastle Corporation, classified Y type but actually W type bodies
Dennis Lancet	1	1	
Volvo B58	1	0	B58-56 demonstrator
Volvo B57	1	1	
TOTAL	3270	2824	

== Other customers ==
As can be seen from the table above, SBG was by far the biggest customer, buying over 86% of the total output of Y Types. However other customers also existed, amongst these being the North Western Road Car Company with 75 Leopards and 30 Bristol REs, Venture of Consett with 32 Leopards and 12 Reliances, Lancaster City Council with 26 Leopards, and Potteries Motor Traction with 25 Reliances.
