= Dennis Javelin =

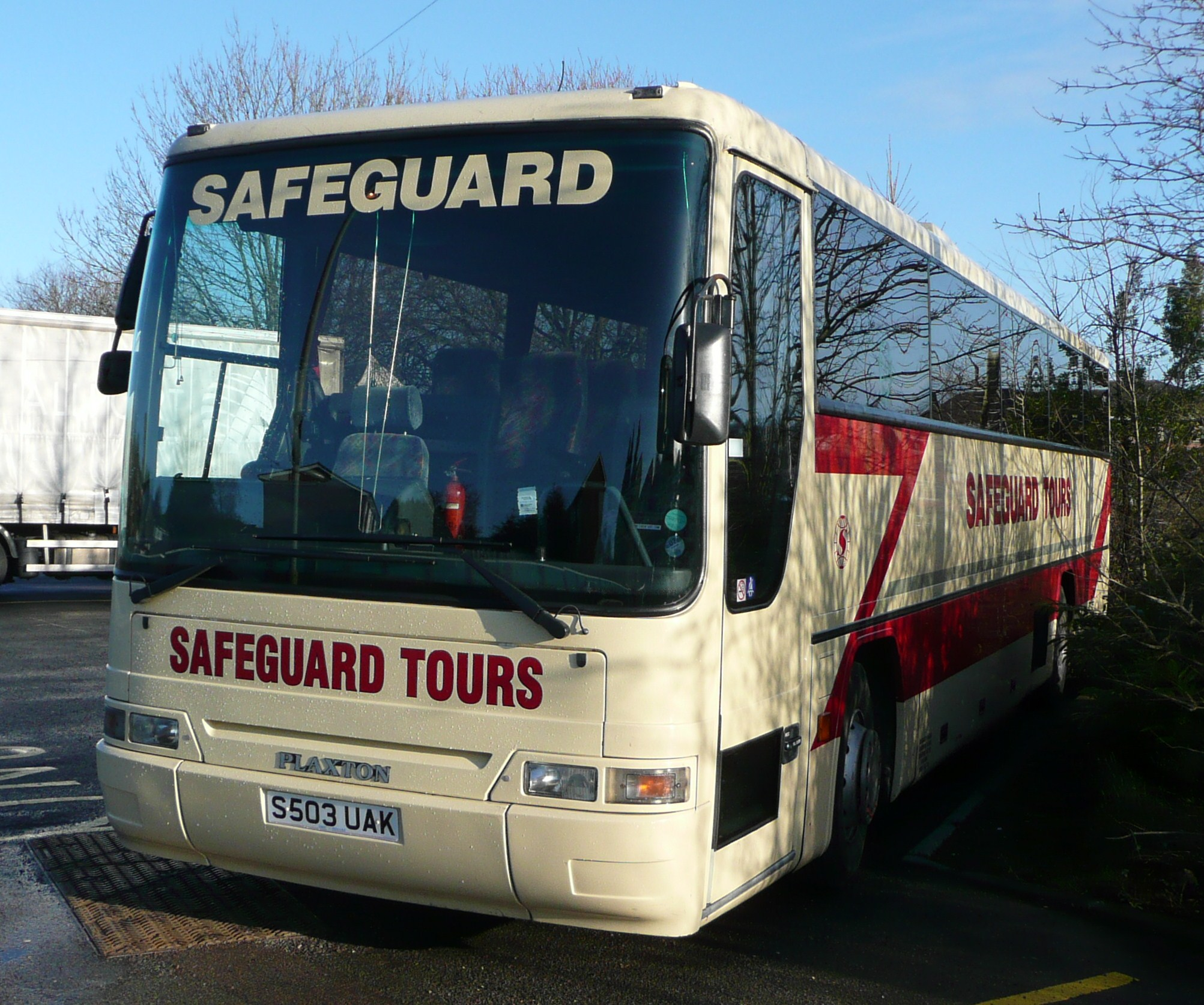
- Safeguard Coaches Plaxton Premiere bodied Dennis Javelin in January 2009

Overview
- Manufacturer: Dennis; Alexander Dennis
- Production: 1986-2010

Body and chassis
- Doors: 1
- Floor type: Step entrance

Powertrain
- Engine: Cummins C series Cummins ISBe
- Transmission: ZF

Dimensions
- Length: 8.5 m (27 ft 10 5/8 in); 10 m (32 ft 9 3/4 in); 11 m (36 ft 1 1/8 in); 12 m (39 ft 4 1/2 in)

Chronology
- Predecessor: Dennis Lancet

The Dennis Javelin (later known as the Alexander Dennis Javelin) was an underfloor-engined bus and coach chassis manufactured by Dennis and later Alexander Dennis. It was unveiled in 1986 and acted more or less as a modern replacement for the discontinued Bedford Y series. It also supplanted the heavier Dennis Dorchester.

While proving a success, it has never matched its nearest rival, the likewise heavier Volvo B10M, but has had much more success than Dennis's previous coaching industry attempts: The Falcon V, the Lancet and Dorchester. Over 2,000 were produced, with 500 purchased by the Ministry of Defence.

== Exports ==
In 1996, Australian operator Fearne's Coaches, Wagga Wagga took delivery of four MotorCoach Australia bodied Javelins. New Zealand operator Ritchies Coachlines took delivery of nine Designline and Kiwi Bus Builders bodied Javelins between 1999 and 2005.
