= Seddon Pennine 7 =

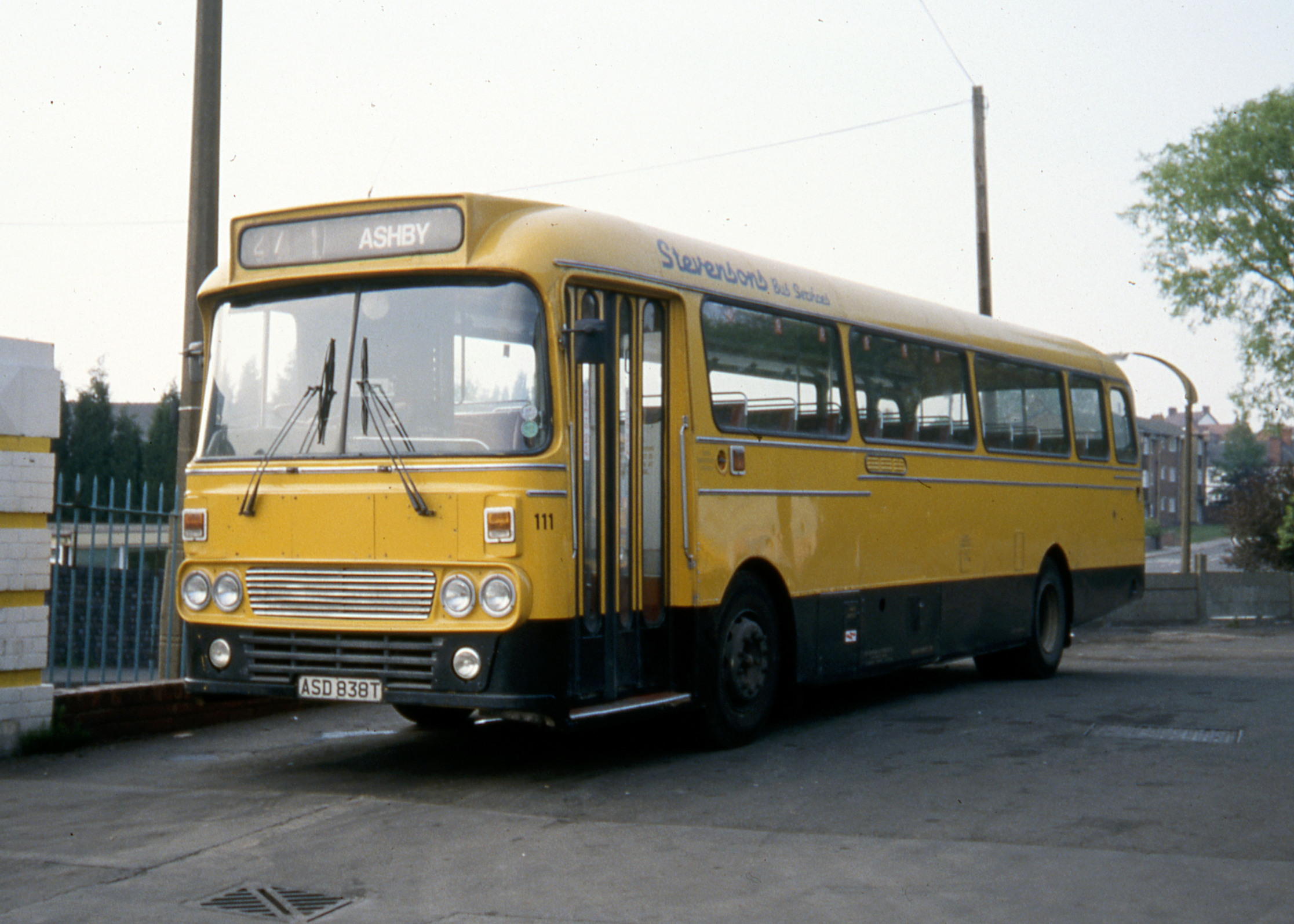
- A Seddon Pennine 7 with Alexander Y Type bodywork in the fleet of Stevensons of Uttoxeter

Overview
- Manufacturer: Seddon Atkinson
- Production: 1974–1982

Body and chassis
- Doors: 1
- Floor type: Step entrance

Powertrain
- Engine: Gardner 6HLXB horizontal I6 diesel
- Power output: 184 bhp (137 kW; 187 PS)
- Transmission: ZF synchromesh 4 or 6 speeds; Self-Changing Gears direct-acting air operated semi-automatic epicyclic, electric control, 4 or 5 speeds

Dimensions
- Wheelbase: 18 ft (5.6 m) or 20 ft (6 m)
- Length: 36 ft (11 m) or 39 ft 4 in (12 m) for 42-57 seats

The Seddon Pennine 7 was a mid-underfloor-engined single-deck bus or coach chassis built by Seddon Atkinson between 1974 and 1982.

== Historical overview ==
Seddon Atkinson Ltd had risen to prominence in the UK bus and coach market in the late 1960s with the Pennine 4 front-engined lightweight chassis and then the Gardner-powered Seddon Pennine RU rear-engined bus. In 1970 Leyland announced it was to cease making the Leopard PSU3/3R, which had a Leyland manual gearbox with a 140 hp (104 kW; 142 PS) O600H engine. All future Leopard production was to be of models with the larger O680H engine and the Pneumocyclic semi-automatic gearbox. The Scottish Bus Group, by this time the only purchaser of the old variant, stated they would not buy semi-automatic Leopards; regarding the O680H as too thirsty, they tried to persuade Leyland to fit the Gardner horizontal engine in the Leopard. Leyland (having had less than full value from previous SBG specials) declined.

As a result, dismayed by the monopoly position British Leyland now enjoyed, Scottish Bus Group approached Seddon Atkinson in 1972 seeking an alternative; at the same time they were working with Ailsa, the Irvine-based Volvo truck importer, on a new type of double-deck underframe. Collaboration with SBG resulted in rapid development. After one prototype, production commenced with the first example bodied and delivered in October 1973; the last entered service after a run of 527 chassis in 1982.

No replacement was produced, thus Seddon's involvement with bus manufacture ended with the Pennine 7.

== Chassis description ==
The Seddon Pennine 7 featured a ladder-frame chassis with channel-section longitudinals and tubular cross-members, available to either 5.6-meter wheelbase for 11-meter bodies or (from 1975) 6m wheelbase for 12-meter bodies. It was horizontal in elevation but only parallel in plan over the leaf-sprung front and rear axles; the nearside member was in-swept at the front to allow a wider low-entrance area, and the offside member was outswept in the wheelbase to allow ready access to the Gardner engine and its auxiliaries. The frame did not continue aft of the rear axle-mounting, collaboration with SBG's preferred supplier Walter Alexander Coachbuilders meant there was no worry about the body builder providing a strongly cantilevered rear overhang capable of supporting a capacious luggage boot, especially after Alexander's switch back (from 1967 to 1972) to aluminium alloy body framing. Power steering was standard. The prototype (carrying a late body by Seddon's Pennine Coachcraft subsidiary) had a Self-Changing Gears semi-automatic gearbox, but production variants were initially to be fitted with a four-speed ZF synchromesh unit, coach versions having a higher ratio final drive allowing a 76 mph (122 km/h) maximum speed, 87 mph (140 km/h) being the designed maximum for bus versions, better acceleration and more flexible performance ensuing with the low ratio back axle.

== Customers ==
It was a chassis commissioned by Scottish Bus Group but only two of its subsidiaries bought the type. Eastern Scottish took 301 (over 57% of production) and Western SMT 213 (over 40%). Most of these were bodied by Alexander but Eastern Scottish took 64 from 1978 to 1981 with Plaxton Supreme III or IV Express bodies, the first ever Plaxton bodies for the SBG. Buses carried the Alexander AY or AYS body and (non-Plaxton) coaches either the AY or AT (Alexander T-Type) body, coaches generally had 49 seats and buses 53, although some of Eastern's touring coaches had 45 reclining seats, generally in the rather bus-like AY body. All of SBG's 11-metre Seddons qualified for New Bus Grant.

The Pennine 7 was originally envisaged just as an 11-metre bus or coach, which meant it was suitable for the UK government's New Bus Grant. In 1974, pleased with the initial batch, Eastern Scottish commissioned a longer version to carry the exclusive and luxurious Alexander M-Type coach body. At the time Anglo-Scottish express services were expanding, and whilst previously Western and Eastern Scottish were the only operators to work to London, Alexander (Fife), and Alexander (Northern) were to gain routes from respectively Kirkcaldy (Fife), Aberdeen and Dundee (Northern) to London. Orders for the new (third series) M-type coaches went to three chassis suppliers, Leyland, Seddon and Volvo, previously Western and Eastern Scottish had chosen a special version of the Bristol RE for M-type bodies but coach variants of the RE were axed earlier in 1974, the final 12-metre examples having gone to United Automobile Services earlier that year. Western Scottish chose the Volvo B58-61, built in Sweden but imported to the UK by Ailsa Bus in Western Scottish's operating area, the coaches for the Alexander companies would be Leyland Leopard PSU5/4R (with O680 engines and 5-speed Pneumocyclic transmission). Eastern Scottish chose the new version of the Pennine 7, unlike previous versions the 12-metre Pennine 7 as commissioned by Eastern Scottish had a 6-speed ZF synchromesh gearbox, top speed was alleged to be 87 mph (140 km/h), the same as the 256 hp (191 kW; 260 PS) Volvos of Western with the same gearbox. As circumstances turned out Eastern Scottish initially took four Leopards in the yellow and black colours of their previous M-types for almost a year before its Seddons were completed, then passing the Leylands on to the Alexander companies. When the Seddons did arrive at the end of 1975 they introduced a new blue and white livery which became standard within SBG for services to London until the mid 1980s. This featured ¾ of a Saltire flag and the single word SCOTTISH on the side. Soon all SBG M-types were painted thus, although at the time every other bus or coach in the Scottish Bus Group ran in the individual operator's own colours contrary to the rigid corporate branding approach of their English and Welsh counterpart.

With the Volvo B58, Leyland Leopard and AEC Reliance supplying the premium-coach class, and with Bus and Car of Belgium, DAF and Mercedes-Benz also offering coaches (the former with a right-hand drive version of the Trailways (USA) coach), the Pennine 7 began to attract orders from private operators, all but one with Plaxton Supreme bodies, the first 12-meter example went to Smith of Wigan late in 1975 with an early Supreme III C50F body. Sworder of Walkern, Hertfordshire had a 57-seater, Young of Rampton, Cambridgeshire and Scotts Greys, Darlington took two 57 seaters. Tally Ho! of Kingsbridge Devon got 53 seaters on 12-meter coaches, OK Motor Services were the only independent to take a Pennine 7 to bus grant specification an 11-meter Supreme II Express with 53 seats. The final Seddon Pennine 7 bodied was BNC334Y which carried a mildly restyled 11-meter Willowbrook 003 coach body seating 42 with a toilet compartment, this went to Johnson of Oldham after Pennine 7 production had ceased, the dealer who had supplied it hoped to attract orders for similar coaches on Dennis Dorchester chassis which did not ensue. The London Borough of Brent bought an 11-meter express-doored Plaxton Supreme example in 1980 for its school transport fleet.

Other than Alexander, Plaxton and Willowbrook the only other body on a new Pennine 7 was by Pennine Coachcraft, this was the prototype, and until their 1979 deliveries (when the two SBG subsidiaries changed their minds on gearboxes) the only one with a Self-Changing Gears transmission. In late 1974 it was completed to full-PSV standards, fitted with 49 semi-coach seats and finished in National Bus Company leaf-green and white bus colours; it was licensed for the first time as UBU72N and sent to Crosville to help them to cover the remedial body and chassis work on the 100 Seddon Pennine RU owned by them, after the rebuilding work was finished it remained with Crosville and was retired after eleven years service, no further Seddons were purchased by NBC.

== In service ==
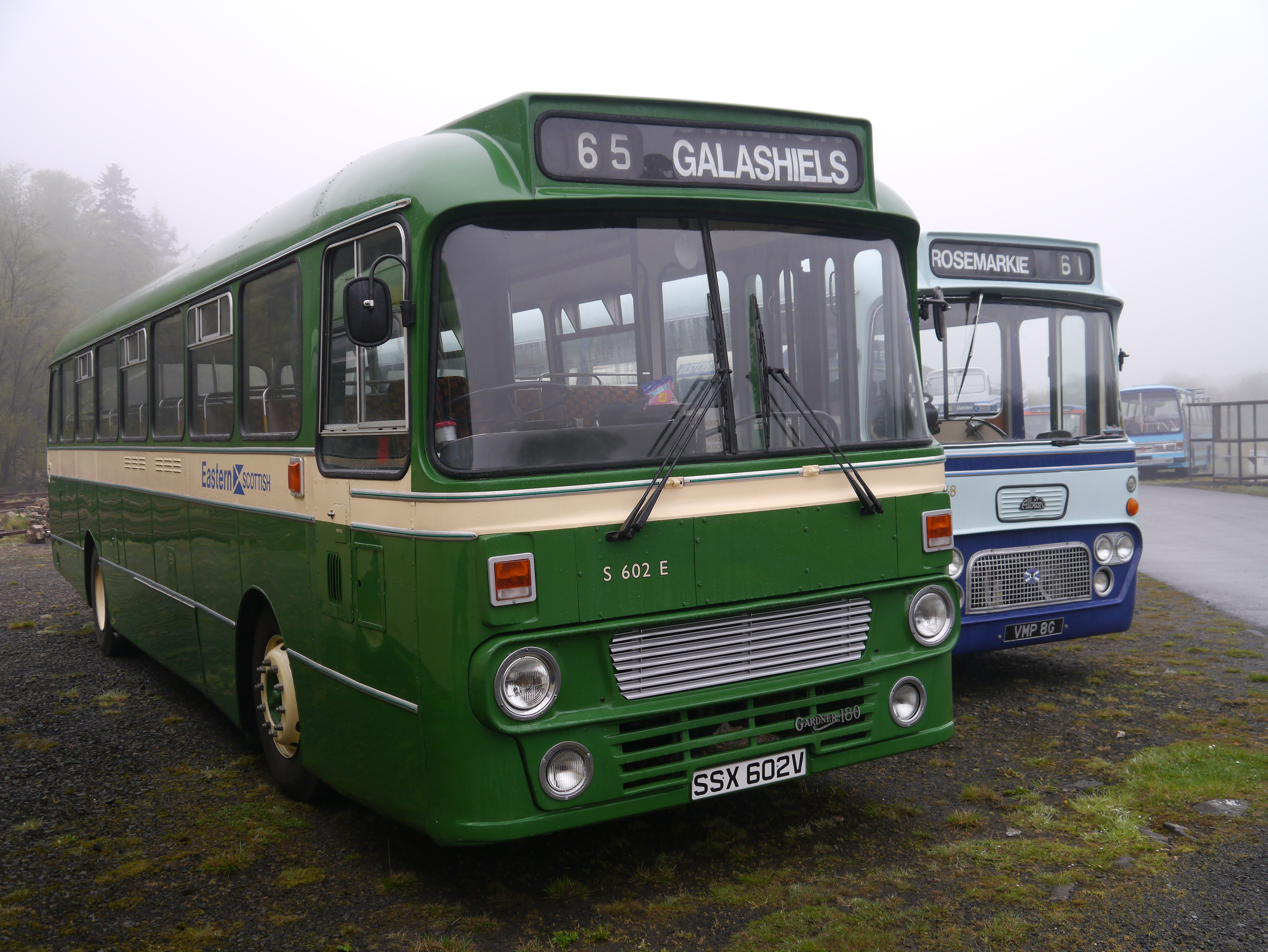
A preserved 1979 Eastern Scottish Seddon Pennine 7 (SSX 602V), pictured alongside Albion Viking VMP 8G at the Scottish Vintage Bus Museum in 2013.

Eastern Scottish's variants were used on local stage routes, long-distance express services and tours, and were not withdrawn early; indeed, under the aegis of its successor operator, First Edinburgh, some Pennine 7s remained in the fleet for over 20 years, with the final examples only being withdrawn in 2000. Western used its Pennine 7 fleet similarly, but had always had a shorter-life policy for its vehicles and the first of their Pennine 7s were offered for sale at around the seven-year mark; four of its early T-type coaches were converted for wheelchair access, with 24 seats and a central wheelchair lift spreading the type to Central and Midland Scottish. Central Scottish's example is at the Glasgow Vintage Vehicle Trust's Bridgeton garage where restoration has started. When new SBG subsidiaries were established in 1985 and Eastern lost its westernmost garages, Kelvin, Midland, Central, Clydeside and Lowland Scottish inherited Pennine 7s, Kelvin ridding itself of them as early as it could as it attempted standardisation.

Not as well known as the Leopard, the Pennine 7 sold less quickly on the second-hand market, but operators included Stevensons of Uttoxeter and Burton and North Eastern Bus Service of Newcastle, both of which standardised on the Seddon for deregulated bus work. The last examples saw out the turn of the century with Allander, Milngavie on school contracts and with Morley, Whittlesey on rural Cambridgeshire services.

== Problems in operation ==
Drivers, particularly coach drivers, felt the Pennine 7 was over-geared, starting-off smoothly from rest sometimes causing trouble, overheating was another early fault, the radiator was mounted directly in front of the engine in mid-wheelbase and was thus shrouded by the coachwork, and in common with many Gardner-engined vehicles the throttle-pedal was regarded as hard to operate. The power-steering took several modifications and adjustments to work properly.

Morley's of Whittlesey found their three astonishingly economical, the high-geared one of the trio (RSD978R) averaging 21 miles per imperial gallon (13 L/100 km; 17 mpg_{‑US}), whilst the two-lower geared examples (NSJ19R & NSJ21R) still achieved 18 mpg_{‑imp} (16 L/100 km; 15 mpg_{‑US}).

== In retrospect ==
SBG did not fulfil Seddon's dreams. Leyland offered SBG alone a four-speed ZF manual option on Leopard which was taken between 1974 and 1978 by Central, Western Scottish and the Alexander companies. Total Pennine 7 production over a decade was less than a year's Leopard production.

From 1980, the six-speed ZF was offered with the Leopard on general sale, but SBG were, by that time, taking the Pneumocyclic.

Western and Central Scottish took the later and similar Dennis Dorchester, and they, Clydeside, Lowland, Northern, and Eastern Scottish took Gardner-engined variants of the Leyland Tiger, by the mid-1980s: a much-weakened Leyland could not refuse SBG's engine preferences.

== Survivors ==
A number of Seddon Pennine 7s have been preserved and are stored at bus museums in Scotland. Among preserved examples one of the Eastern M types survives at the Scottish Vintage Bus Museum. MSF750P is the only Alexander M-Type bodied coach fully restored. Y-type, T-type and Plaxton-bodied examples also survive, some preserved, some in non-psv roles. Only one Pennine 7 is known to have been rebodied, former Western MSJ388P which was purchased by a Lancashire businessman in the late 1980s for conversion into a racing car transporter, the Alexander T-type body proved unsound so the businessman, Andrew Wareing, asked Duple to rebody it, they politely declined, having never bodied the type, so one of Mr Wareing's employees, aided by a friend who worked at Duple, were tasked with building a new body which features a number of Duple 320 components, this vehicle, re-registered 5887AW, has been in use as a car transporter for over 20 years.

Former Western Scottish Y Type BSD 857T has been converted into a motorcaravan.
