= New Plymouth City Transport =

Former municipal transport operator in New Plymouth, New Zealand

- Parent: New Plymouth Borough/City Council
- Commenced operation: March 10, 1916
- Ceased operation: 1991
- Defunct: Yes
- Headquarters: Transport House; 2 Egmont Street
- Locale: New Plymouth
- Service type: Bus, Trolley Bus, Tram
- Routes: 16
- Depots: Rangi Street (bus depot); Fitzroy (tram sheds); Liardet Street (electricity depot)
- Fuel type: Overhead Electric; Battery-Electric; Petrol; Diesel

New Plymouth City Transport (originally known as New Plymouth Tramways) was a council-owned public transport operator in New Plymouth, New Zealand. It was established in 1916 with the opening of the borough’s electric tramway system and remained in operation for 75 years.

The system went through several transitions: electric trams (1916–1954), trolleybuses (1950–1967), and a succession of battery-electric, petrol and diesel powered buses from the 1920s through to the early 1990s. In 1991, regulatory changes required the council to divest its bus services, and the operation was sold to Gold Star Bus Lines, ending direct municipal involvement in public transport.

== Early private services ==
New Plymouth-Fitzroy horse-drawn omnibus

Before municipal control, public transport in New Plymouth was provided by private operators. Early attempts to start a regular service occurred in the 1890s. In April 1892, W. Courtney announced his intention to run a bus to Fitzroy “within two months,” promoting it as a catalyst for local growth. In March 1894, a public meeting was held to form the New Plymouth and Fitzroy Omnibus Company, which proposed to purchase a Jubilee omnibus similar to those in Auckland at the time.

Neither venture appears to have succeeded, but on 21 May 1894 M. Jones of the Criterion Livery Stables began a new service from Fitzroy to town, using a bus imported from Auckland. The bus could carry ten passengers inside and four outside, and was described as “splendidly finished off” with plush-covered seats, curtained windows, and overhead racks for parcels." Fares were sixpence one way, and the route also extended to the Breakwater on some trips.

As suburban growth created new demand, there was growth in both the number of routes covered and the number of operators, leading in 1902 to a brief period of intense competition. For example, in 1902 a competing Breakwater–New Plymouth service was advertised by H Sparks, while S W Jury started running on the New Plymouth–Westown run Jury took over Sparks Breakwater service in 1903.

That same year, another competing service named Cathro’s bus started between Fitzroy and New Plymouth. In 1903 Fitzroy services had all been taken over by operator J. W. West. That same year M. Jones started a new service along Carrington Road to Vogeltown.

By the mid-1910s, omnibuses were falling out of favour in favour of self-propelled vehicles. In August 1915 West sold his horses and a replacement motor bus service to Fitzroy and the Breakwater was introduced by M Jones. By 1916 motorbus services were also running to Vogeltown, Westown and Frankleigh Park. These developments marked the shift away from horse-drawn transport — a transition that would accelerate once the Borough Council took control and introduced electric trams and battery buses.

== Council-run services (1916–1991) ==
=== Tramways (1916–1954) ===
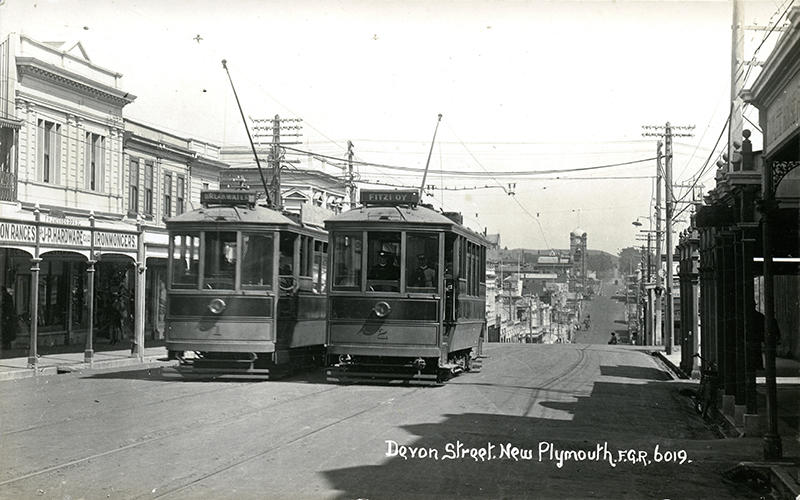
Devon Street, New Plymouth with trams number 1 (service to Breakwater) and 2 (service to Fitzroy). Depicts the eastern side of the Liardet and Devon street intersection, looking towards the Clock Tower in the distance.

By 1910, New Plymouth had begun exploring the introduction of an electric tramway system. A council committee examined the options and reported two possibilities:

- a single line between Fitzroy and the Breakwater
- the same, with branches to Vogeltown and Elliot Road (now Tukapa Street)

The committee recommended building only the main Fitzroy–Breakwater line initially, noting that further extensions would only be viable with significant population growth. Frankleigh Park was deemed entirely unsuitable for tram services.

Before any tramway construction could begin, the council sought to amalgamate the separate Fitzroy and St Aubyn town districts, along with Westown, Vogeltown, and Frankleigh Park (then part of the Hurworth Riding of Taranaki County), into the Borough of New Plymouth. Consolidation under one authority was seen as essential for laying track without protracted negotiations between multiple councils and to avoid the expense of establishing a separate transport board.

In March 1913, a vote authorised the construction of tramways within the expanded borough. Although “trackless trams” or motor buses were suggested as cheaper alternatives, the council opted to proceed with a conventional electric tramway.

The New Plymouth Borough Council launched the tramway on 10 March 1916, initially running from Fitzroy past the railway station to Weymouth Street. The full route to the Breakwater opened on 21 April, and the Morley Road extension on 20 May. The network was officially opened on 1 June 1916.

New Plymouth Use the Trams advertisement from 1939

When the network officially opened, two routes were in operation:

- Fitzroy – New Plymouth – Breakwater
- Eliot Street – New Plymouth – Morley Road

Calls for further expansion soon followed. The first extension was a 1.7 kilometres (1.1 mi) continuation of the Morley Road line to David Street in Westown, accompanied by the purchase of three additional tramcars. This extension opened on 29 November 1923, though it did not reach as far into Westown as many residents had hoped (or as the existing bus service did). Limited electricity generating capacity and the £19,000 cost constrained how far the Borough could extend the line. By comparison, the original 8 kilometres (5.0 mi) system, including six trams, depot, and electrical infrastructure, had cost £56,000 in total.

The short length of the Westown line became a point of contention. It had three fare sections, the same as the longer Fitzroy and Breakwater routes, despite covering only 2.5 kilometres (1.6 mi). By contrast, the Fitzroy line was 3.13 kilometres (1.94 mi) and the Breakwater line about 4 kilometres (2.5 mi). With fares set at 2d for the first section and 1d for each additional stage, Westown residents argued that they were paying disproportionately more for a shorter journey.

The next extension opened in 1924 when track was laid along Liardet Street and Gilbert Street to the Pukekura Park entrance there. A spur further up Liardet street was also laid for football game traffic. The line was widely seen as the beginning of the tram service to Vogeltown. The line also provided a triangle at Devon Street where trams could be turned. From this day, Westown trams were extended to run all the way through to Pukekura Park.

This was to be the last expansion of the tram service. Investigations on which road trams should take to reach Vogeltown, concerns on the narrowness of Carrington Street and the potential cost scuppered any extensions. A 1930 proposal sought to extend the Westown line to Upper Westown (now Hurdon), freeing up the bus for other services, but this did not proceed due to lack of funds.

The Liardet Street service by itself was never a paying proposition, and the line was the first to close in 1937, with the track reclaimed and used for other track modifications in the system. This change also coincided with rugby moving from Pukekura Park to the newly built Rugby Park grounds in Westown. The service was replaced with the through-routing of Avenue Road buses down Liardet Street. The rest of the system was retained as it was considered to have a useful life of around 15 years before the trams needed replacing, and while the cost of running a fully diesel bus system was estimated as slightly lower than trams, the upfront cost of replacing vehicles was considered unaffordable.

The Westown line was the next to close on 6 October 1950, replaced with a lower-cost trolley bus service running to Upper Westown. The core route between Fitzroy and The Port remained in service, and in 1950 enquiries were made for the purchase of three former Wanganui trams recently taken out of service when that city's network closed down. Wanganui wanted £450 per tram, which was not accepted, while New Plymouths offer of £100 per tram and £150 for spares was not accepted by Wanganui. This effectively locked in the end of the trams in New Plymouth. In November 1953, the Fitzroy–Port trams were still carrying around half of the public transport system's passengers, but patronage was falling, with 135,638 passengers (6,838 fewer than in November 1952), while bus and trolleybus patronage rose over the same period. The system closed for good on 23 July 1954.

==== Fleet Details ====
Boon car number 2 in loading in Devon Street in 1948.

===== Boon cars =====
In July 1914 the Borough Council accepted a tender from F. S. Greenshields and Co. of Wellington, at around £8,012, for six tramcars to be built by Boon & Co. of Christchurch. The cars were built in 1915 and delivered by ship to New Plymouth, where a steam tractor and trailer hauled them to the Fitzroy depot. The trailer's coupling reportedly broke on the hill approaching the Henui bridge, but it ran into the bank without damage, and the two bogie cars were said to have nearly been lost overboard when the ship carrying them met a heavy storm. Cars 1 to 6 were available when the tramway opened, although No. 6 had not yet been certified for use and stayed in the depot yard.

Cars 1 to 4 were four-wheel single-truck cars on United Electric Car Company trucks, with Dick Kerr electrical equipment and two 35 hp motors. Each had an enclosed central compartment, with sliding doors in the bulkheads and cane-covered seats, and a semi-open compartment with wooden batten seats at either end. They were fitted with hand brakes only. Cars 5 and 6 were larger double-bogie cars divided into two saloons by a bulkhead with a sliding door, running on two United Electrical bogies, each with a 45 hp Dick Kerr motor, and also with hand brakes only. Car 10, the last tram built for the system, was delivered in 1925. It was essentially identical to cars 5 and 6, except that its bogies were by the English Electric Company (which had absorbed Dick Kerr) and its motors were rated at 50 hp.

The Boon cars were substantially rebuilt during their lives as the council moved towards one-man operation. In 1923 cars 1 to 4 were rebuilt with enclosed platforms, folding end doors in place of chains, and motorman-operated double doors, although one-man running could not begin until air brakes and dead-man controls had been fitted. These were added around 1930, and the four cars re-entered service in one-man form between June 1930 and January 1931. Cars 5 and 6 were converted to motorman-only operation in 1932, gaining outward-opening doors worked from the controls, a manually operated folding rear door, air brakes and dead-man controls. Car 10 was not fitted with air brakes or dead-man controls until 1938. In 1936–37 the centre bulkheads of cars 1 to 4 were removed to make them single-saloon cars, with the same change made to cars 5, 6 and 10 later in the 1930s. The destination boxes were also moved from the roof to the top of the front left window, in the style of the Birneys. All of the Boon cars were in service when the system closed in 1954, apart from car 4, which was sidelined on the last day with a loose tyre.

===== Birney Safety Cars =====
In July 1920 the Governor-General-in-Council sanctioned the introduction of one-man tram operation in New Plymouth, and the Borough Council authorised its electrical engineers to purchase three cars suitable for either one-man or two-man control, at an estimated price of about £3,600 each. The council retained the right to cancel the order for two of the cars within three months, and the purchase was made conditional on a loan for tramway extensions being carried. The cars ordered were of the Birney Safety type, and in January 1921 the tramway manager, R. H. Bartley, received construction plans for them, with delivery expected around April. The Birney was a lightweight, steel-bodied design suitable for either one-man or conventional operation. Being lighter than the existing cars, it was expected to reduce wear on the track, and it was capable of quicker acceleration and higher schedule speeds. The newspaper reported that New Plymouth would be the first system to adopt this particular car, and that Invercargill had also chosen Birneys for its most recent order. It also noted that the type was in use on around 170 systems in the United States.

The three cars arrived later than first expected and were undergoing trials by October 1921. Their bodies were built of riveted steel plate, and they seated 28 passengers, with provision for standing passengers and smoking permitted in the three rear seats. Passengers could signal the driver using electric buzzers. The Birneys sat lower and were squarer in profile than the existing wooden-bodied cars. Although the mayor, F. E. Wilson, and councillors were given a demonstration run, the cars' appearance drew some early criticism. The cars were American-built, except for the roofs, which were damaged in transit and replaced by the tramways staff, who also fitted a kauri ceiling.

The cars introduced several safety features new to the New Plymouth system. A "dead-man" control cut the power if the operator released the controller handle, and the air brakes (adapted from a Westinghouse design) were fitted with sanding gear. The doors and folding step were interlocked with the controls, so the car could not start until the doors were closed and the step raised, and the doors could not be opened until the car had stopped. The cars also carried three forms of electric braking and a handbrake for emergencies.

Although the Birneys were designed for one-man operation, the council did not intend to introduce it immediately. Tramways staff planned to revise the ticketing system first and then phase in one-man running gradually, along with queue loading and pay-as-you-enter or pay-as-you-leave fare collection. The cars cost about £3,000 each, and Bartley was optimistic that their lower weight would reduce power consumption and track maintenance costs, with the council hoping this might eventually allow fares to be reduced.

Vehicle Type	Fleet numbers	Year Introduced	Details
4-wheel, single-truck single-saloon	1–4	1916	Built by Boon & Co, Christchurch
Double-bogie, double-saloon	5–6	1916	Built by Boon & Co, Christchurch
4-wheel, single-truck Birney Safety Cars	7–9	1921	Built by J. G. Brill & Co, USA
Double-bogie, double-saloon	10	1925	Built by Boon & Co, Christchurch

All trams remained in service until the closure of the system in 1954. By this point they had all been updated to match the Birney trams, including a single saloon inside, fully enclosed, lowered destination blinds and converted for single-man operation.

=== Battery buses (1919–1931) ===
Battery-electric bus #2 parked corner of Devon and Brougham Streets - 1925

Upon the launch of the tramway system, attention soon turned to how best to serve the parts of New Plymouth that did not yet have the population density to justify a tram service. The solution was found in the 1919 purchase by the Borough Council of a Walker battery-electric truck, fitted with a locally built bus body.

The bus could travel at 15–20 miles per hour on level ground and about 6 miles per hour on hills. Despite its solid rubber tyres, it was considered comfortable at moderate speeds on well-metalled roads. The vehicle was equipped with leather-upholstered seats, opening windows, and electric lighting, and operating costs were reported at only 4–5 shillings per day. It was somewhat encumbered by the weight of the on-board batteries though.

From 11 March 1919, the bus operated services to both Westown and Vogeltown (the latter service terminating at Doralto Road in Frankleigh Park), as well as to Frankley Road. The Westown route, which had been without buses since the private company running the service stopped in 1916, ran only as far as Omata Road (much to the annoyance of residents further on). Originally operated as a separate service, from 1922 this bus was administered as an extension of the tramway service.

The electric bus proved popular enough that in 1922 a second, larger battery bus was purchased to relieve overcrowding. The body was built in Christchurch at the cost of £360. Around the same time, investigations into tram routes to Westown and Vogeltown also resumed.

By 1922, Westown was judged large enough to support a tram line, and an extension of the Morley Street branch to David Street (along with the acquisition of three new tramcars) was authorised. The bus, meanwhile, continued to serve Vogeltown and Frankleigh Park, as well as new services in 1923-24 to South Road and Upper Westown, running via Vaele’s Estate (now Lynmouth).

The two vehicles were overhauled in 1925-26 (after the first petrol bus was introduced), but the original electric bus was withdrawn from service in 1929. In 1931, the Council authorised replacing the second bus with a Bedford petrol vehicle, as the electric bus was described as “obsolete and worn out.”

==== Fleet Details ====
Vehicle Type	Fleet numbers	Year Introduced	Details
Walker Model L battery-electric bus	1	1919	First electric bus purchased by the Borough Council; operated to Westown, Vogeltown, and Frankleigh Park. Withdrawn in 1929.
Walker Special Model 42 battery-electric bus	2	1922	Larger replacement vehicle; branded "New Plymouth Municipal Tramways" and numbered 2. Declared obsolete by 1931 and replaced.

New Plymouth Walker Battery Buses
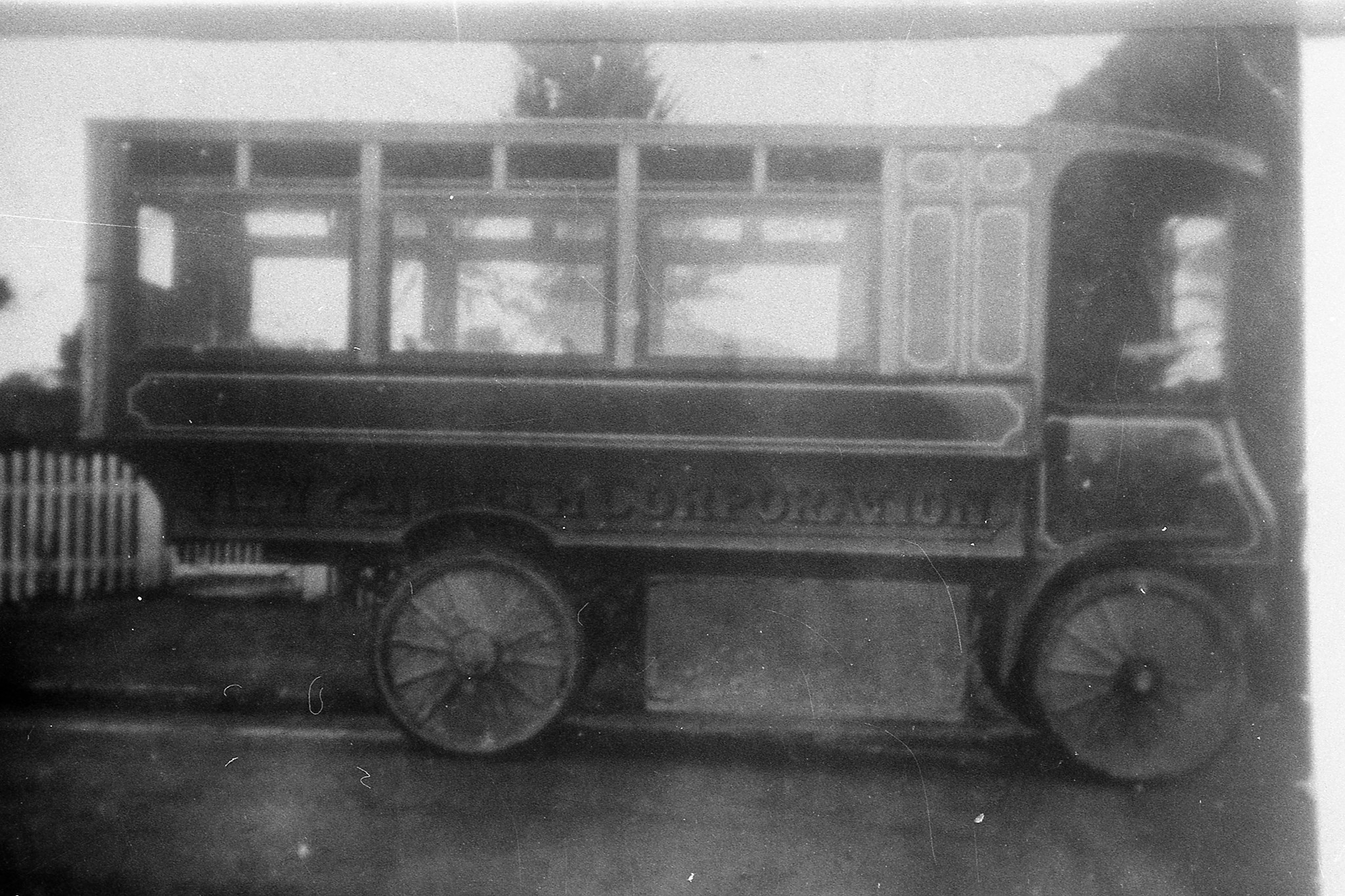
Battery-electric number #1

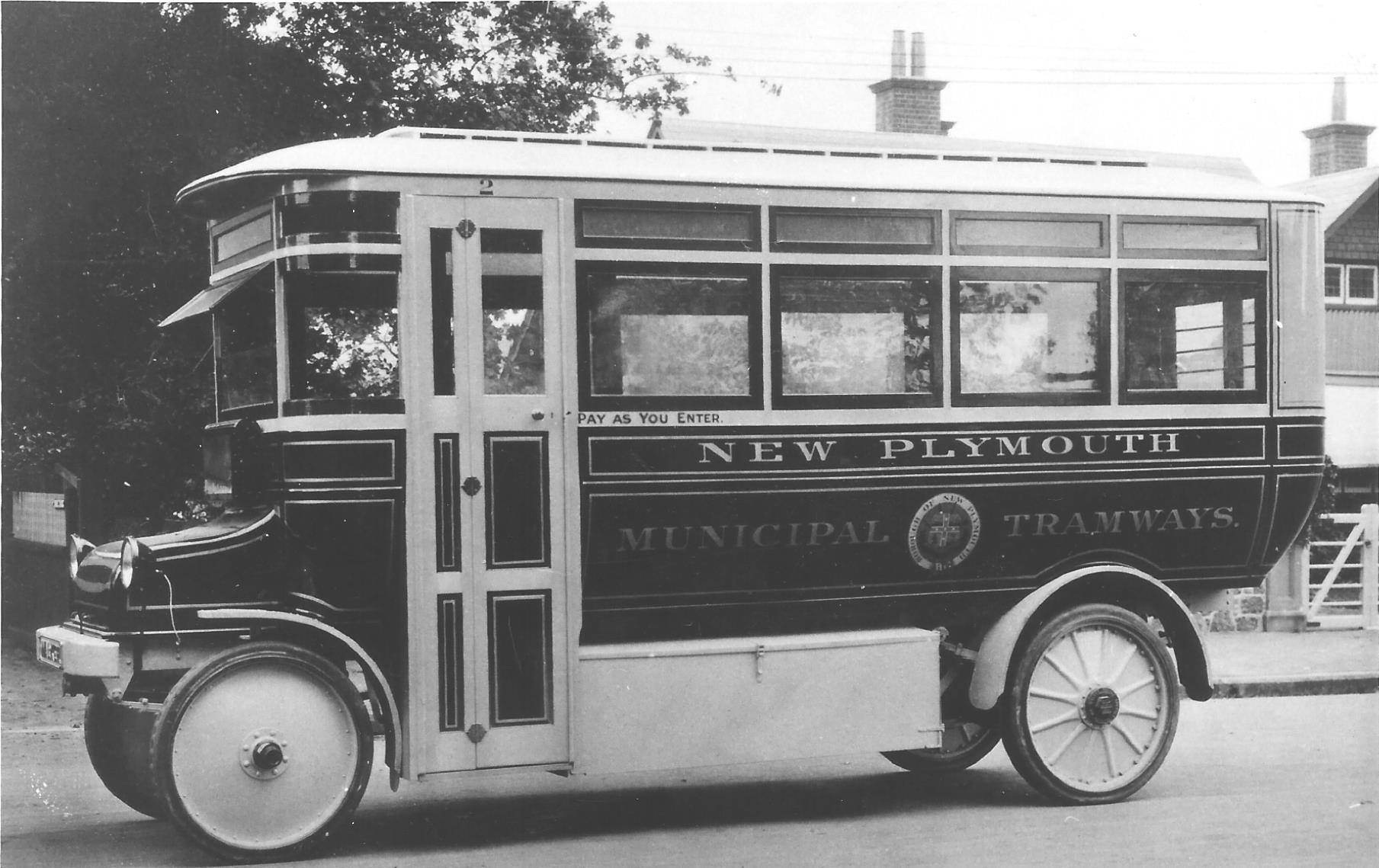
Battery-electric number #2

=== Trolleybuses (1950–1967) ===
The idea of trolleybuses (then called 'railless' or 'trackless' trams) was first mooted in New Plymouth in 1918, according to a 1950 retrospective, which describes the town clerk, F. T. Bellringer, advocating them as the next best system to extending the trams, whose construction costs had risen to nearly three times pre-war levels. In June 1920 the council discussed using railless trolleys instead of extending the tramway to Westown, after the general manager cited sharply higher post-war costs for rails and materials and the recent adoption of the system at Leeds and Bradford. He said he had made the same suggestion when the extension was first mooted some years earlier, but it had not found favour. The tramways engineer thought one system might serve two suburbs for the cost of a tramline to one, and the council deferred the matter pending further information. In October 1920 it was suggested that trackless trams could serve both Westown and Vogeltown, instead of building a tram line to Westown alone. A visiting English Electric Company representative said in 1920 that he had not seen a better proposition for the system. In November 1920 ratepayers rejected loan proposals for two alternative schemes involving railless trams, one combining a tram extension to David Street with a railless route to Vogeltown, and the other providing railless routes to both suburbs. In 1922 the council investigated trolleybuses for hilly routes beyond the existing tramway, but a plain tram extension to David Street, at a cost of £19,000, was approved at a poll in September 1922.

By early 1925 it had been suggested that a loop service from Vogeltown to Avenue Road could be run for the cost of a single tramline to Vogeltown. Proposals resurfaced in July 1935, with reports canvassing trolleybus conversion in lieu of costly relaying and identifying lines to Westown, Vogeltown and Frankleigh Park as likely candidates, but no action was taken. In December 1937 the council decided to retain the rest of the tram system.

Interest returned towards the end of the Second World War. In 1945, 14 Crossley TSD42/1 trolleybus chassis were ordered by the Passenger Transport Federation of New Zealand, of which the New Plymouth Borough Council was a member. Ten were for Wellington, while the other four were ordered to replace the Westown tram route, which required money to be spent on improvements. Despite early reports recommending trolley bus services to both Vogeltown and Westown, the council decided not to include Vogeltown in the scheme. The New Plymouth chassis were expected to leave England in mid-1946, with Wellington preparing the body blueprints for both cities, but the first was not landed, from the motorship Orari, until 1947. The bodies were built in New Plymouth, using locally sourced rimu and beech wood from the South Island, to plans supplied by Wellington, under the supervision of depot superintendent L. Vercoe.

Westown was still viewed by some as just the first route to be converted, and in 1948 the council adopted a policy of converting all tram and main bus routes to trolleybuses. Other suggested routes included up Avenue Road and returning via both Brooklands and Carrington Roads, or up Frankley Road and returning via Westown. In February 1949 a report by Welch, Wellington's tramways engineer, judged the purchase justified, citing the trend towards replacing trams with rubber-tyred vehicles and the expected growth of Westown. He recommended gradually replacing the tram system, with the four buses running on a combined Westown–Vogeltown route, and advised that the Port–Fitzroy trams should be the last to go because the servicing facilities were at Fitzroy. He also considered it uneconomic to keep a converter substation running for only four trolleybuses, but estimated that abandoning them would cost about £3,500.

Despite this, by May 1949 the council was trying to sell the buses, and both Dunedin and Wellington declined. A policy change that year saw New Plymouth get cold feet after seeing the full cost of improving roads to withstand trolleybuses, and the 1950 retrospective attributes the attempted sale to the council's financial problems. With no buyer found, the council decided to proceed with the conversion.

The four buses were ready for testing at the Fitzroy depot by June 1950. On 20 June one made a trial run from the depot to Eliot Street using the tram overhead, with a drag connection running in the tram rail groove to complete the return circuit, before officers from the Transport Department and Ministry of Works carried out their inspections. To allow the Westown overhead to be rebuilt for trolleybuses, tram services beyond Morley Street were replaced by buses from 14 September 1950, with trams continuing to run between Liardet Street and Morley Street to connect with them. The last tram ran on 6 October 1950, an informal trip that went only as far as Morley Street, where passengers transferred to a waiting bus. The trolleybus route ran from a terminus at Liardet Street, looping through the town centre via Robe and Powderham Streets, to Westown, with new wiring extending beyond the tram terminus at David Street to the junction of Wallath Road and Elliot Road at the end of Tukapo Street (now Tukapa Street).

The Westown service was opened on 27 October 1950 by the mayor, who drove the lead bus (no. 2) in a convoy of all four. Bus no. 4 was briefly immobilised when its poles came off the wires, and crowds of joyriders on the opening afternoon and evening upset the timetable, leaving Westown residents waiting at stops. The mayor spoke of Vogeltown residents being served in due course, but Westown remained the only route converted. Passengers complained of the heat inside the buses from the start. The original design drew air in through a fan at the rear of the chassis, but Wellington found that this sucked in dust, and the intake was moved to the side before the New Plymouth buses were completed. With the windows sealed, this still proved insufficient. In January 1951 four adjustable sliding windows were fitted to each of the four buses, using frames of a type used on New Zealand-built buses. In November 1953 the trolleybuses carried 57,179 passengers, 3,231 more than in November 1952.

With its single route to Westown and a short working to Cutfield Road, the system remained New Zealand's only provincial trolleybus system, and became an anomaly in New Plymouth (especially after the closure of the tram system in 1954) as the only electric vehicles in the fleet. Until 1964 the trolleybuses were housed at the Electricity Department's depot in Liardet Street, and from then at the Rangi Street bus yard. The service ended on 7 October 1967, with three of the four buses still in use, and three AEC Reliance buses arrived that year to replace them. The Tramway Historical Society (Ferrymead) and the Wellington Tramway Museum jointly tendered for the entire system, including the overhead, trolleybuses and ancillary equipment, planning to fund the purchase by selling half of the overhead, and the Wellington Tramway Museum dismantled the route.

==== Fleet Details ====
Vehicle Type	Fleet numbers	Year Introduced	Details
Crossley TSD42/1 trolleybus	1–4	1950	Four vehicles ordered in 1945 alongside Wellington's order, with bodies built locally in rimu and beech. Entered service on the Westown route in October 1950 (officially opened 27 October) in red and cream paint, with fairings around the trolley bases, and sliding windows were added in January 1951 to improve ventilation. Housed at Liardet Street until 1964, then Rangi Street. No. 4 was withdrawn before closure, and the other three ran until 7 October 1967.

=== Petrol & Diesel Buses (1925–1991) ===
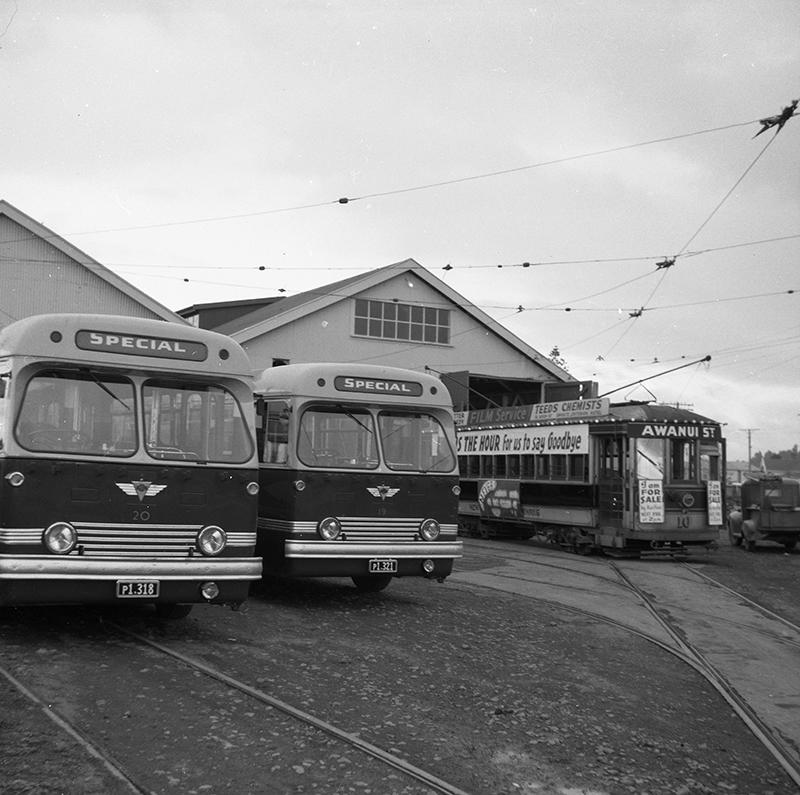
Two AEC Regal IV buses and a tram parked outside the Fitzroy Depot on the last day of the operation of trams in New Plymouth.

New Plymouth hired a petrol bus in 1920 to compare costs with its battery bus, but did not buy its first petrol-powered bus until 1925, a Vulcan purchased to relieve pressure on the two battery-electric vehicles already in service. The Vulcan maintained services alone over Christmas 1925. A second petrol vehicle was purchased in 1926, and a third larger petrol bus followed in 1927, seating 28 (plus nine standing) and fitted with “double balloon tyres” on the rear axle. Its purchase was controversial, as the council chose an American chassis instead of a British one, prompting protests from local residents. Additional purchases included a Bedford WHB in 1931 to replace the second battery bus. In 1934, the whole fleet was replaced with 3 new Morris Commercial vehicles (though two had recycled bodies from previous vehicles).

The first diesel bus, a 25-seat Leyland Cub, entered service in 1937, followed by two more in 1938. The first vehicle was reported to average approximately 16 miles per gallon, with operating costs of around 10 shillings per 100 miles, and its performance and economy attracted favourable comment from the Borough Council. This marked the start of a long association with British-built vehicles that lasted into the 1970s. Over the next decades, the council operated a succession of Leyland Lioness, Leyland Tiger, AEC Regal IV (including those that replaced the trams), and AEC Reliance models (including three that replaced the trolleybuses), as well as Bedford SB and VAM chassis.

Apart from the American-built White of 1927, the main break from British supply came in 1945, when shortages led to the purchase of two American vehicles: a Diamond T and a Ford V8 bus.

From the mid-1970s, the fleet moved towards European models, with Mercedes-Benz O305s, Volvo B58s and MAN SL202s alongside British Leyland Leopards. The MANs, delivered in 1986–87, were the final new vehicles acquired before privatisation in 1991.

==== Fleet Details ====
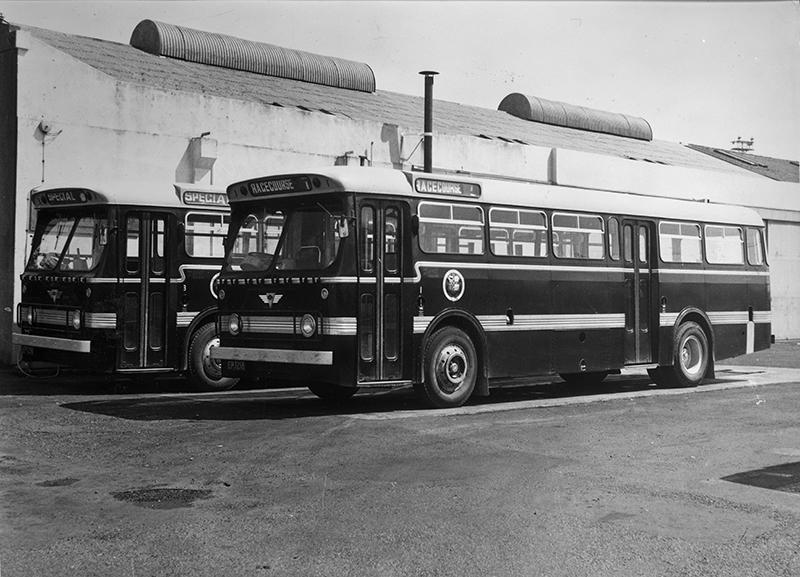
Two buses parked outside the Rangi Street Depot. These are two of three 1967 model AEC Reliance buses purchased to replace trolley buses on the Westown route. October 1967.

New Plymouth experimented with manufacturers in its early years, buying chassis from the English firms Vulcan, Thornycroft and Bedford and the American firm White. Early vehicles tended to have quite short lives before being replaced, showing the experimental nature of many of these vehicles, although a bus bought in 1934 was still in service in 1953, when the council applied to the depreciation fund commissioners for £7,600 to renew or replace it. The first attempt at standardisation occurred in 1934 with three Morris Commercial chassis, though two of these reused bodywork from earlier vehicles that were only a few years old.

The first truly 'standard' vehicle came in 1937–38 with three identical Leyland Cubs. In the war years these were followed by two second-hand Leyland Lionesses from Wellington City Council Tramways (WCCT). Wellington designs then became a pattern: a Bedford WTB and the Ford V8 had bodies built by WCCT, while the three half-cab Leyland Tigers (and the Crossley trolleybuses) were bodied in the council's own workshops to WCCT designs, beginning a tradition of New Plymouth buses resembling those in other parts of the country.

From the 1950s New Plymouth began its tradition of “piggybacking” its orders onto those of larger cities, and many of its buses were similar or identical to those running in Auckland, Christchurch, Dunedin and Wellington. Orders shared with Christchurch included the Regal IVs of 1952 and 1954 and the Reliances of 1958, and the 1967 Reliances had bodywork identical to Christchurch's 1963–64 batch.

The largest single vehicle type was the AEC Regal IV, of which ten were bought between 1952 and 1955, two with Crossley bodies and eight with Park Royal bodies. Other parallels included the Mercedes-Benz O305s (similar to Auckland’s), Hawke Hunter-bodied Leyland Leopards (comparable, though slightly longer, to Wellington’s), and MAN SL202s, also seen in Auckland, Wellington, and Christchurch.

===== Leyland Tigers =====
In late 1946 the tramways department began building bus bodies at its Fitzroy workshops, the first coachbuilding undertaken in New Plymouth, on new diesel chassis imported from Britain. The work followed plans and specifications obtained from Wellington, where three buses of the same type were already in use, and was carried out by regular tramways staff under depot superintendent L. Vercoe, although shortages of materials, fittings and skilled labour slowed progress. The first, No. 13, entered service on the Vogeltown–Avenue Road route on Friday 13 June 1947, after two days of test runs.

At 37 seats the bus was described as the biggest yet seen in New Plymouth, compared with 25 in the vehicles then used on town runs. It had a front entrance and rear exit, both worked by vacuum from the driver's seat, vacuum brakes, and an emergency door halfway along the right-hand side. The left front corner of the body was cut away to give access to the engine, the seat frames were steel tube made in Christchurch and covered in leather, and the woodwork was mainly Southland beech. No. 14 followed on 19 December 1947, with No. 15 nearing completion. The three buses brought the fleet to 14. They were intended to let the smaller borough vehicles be withdrawn from regular service and used only for occasional trips, most likely the Morris vehicles as in November 1948, the council advertised two Morris buses, seating 18 and 23 passengers respectively, for sale by tender. Both were still in service at the time. Later accounts identify them as three half-cab Leyland Tigers, bodied in the council's workshops to Wellington City Corporation Tramways' design.

===== AEC Regal IV =====
In June 1951 the City Council announced the purchase of two 42-seat AEC Regal Mark IV buses, which were to replace two older, smaller municipal buses. The Associated Equipment Company was to supply the chassis and engine, and the buses were to have light-alloy bodies, a fluid flywheel and pre-selector gearbox, and electrically operated doors interlocked with the controls. By June 1952 delivery was promised within about ten weeks. Each bus had a 120 hp diesel engine mounted horizontally under the floor and carried 42 seated and 21 standing passengers, compared with 37 and 18 in the existing buses. They were reported to cost about £6,800 each, and the same type had been ordered by Christchurch. The first bus off the assembly line, photographed during testing in England, was destined for Christchurch. The second New Plymouth bus arrived on 6 October 1952, driven from Wellington after being unloaded from the Sussex, and the pair were to be used on the Vogeltown and Avenue Road routes. The 1952 pair were bodied by Crossley, and the eight later buses by Park Royal.

By March 1953 buses had replaced trams on the main tram route on Saturday mornings and Sundays. In May 1953 the Local Government Loans Board approved a £30,000 overdraft to buy four buses, with other funds in hand for a fifth, and the council ordered five diesel buses similar to the two already in service in order to complete the changeover from trams. The order was part of a larger one placed by several New Zealand transport authorities. The buses were to be painted in the tramway colours in England. The council was later cabled ex-works delivery dates of 20 January, 7 February and 14 February 1954 for two, two and one buses respectively, which with shipping and testing meant arrival in New Plymouth around mid-April. The committee chairman, K. M. Ward, expressed disappointment that this meant the roughly six miles of tram track could not be lifted over the summer, because the roadway could only be resealed in warm weather.

===== Fleet List =====
Details of the earliest petrol and diesel buses are sparse, as newspaper coverage often omits makes and specifications.

Vehicle Type	Body Style	Fleet numbers	Seating	Year Introduced	Details
Vulcan	Bate & Bell	3	-	1925	First petrol-powered bus purchased; operated alongside Walker battery buses. Withdrawn by 1934
Thornycroft	Eden Motor Body	4	19	1926	Withdrawn 1934 and body reused.
White Bus	G.J & Williams	5	29	1927	Purchase caused local controversy for not supporting British industry. Withdrawn by 1934
Bedford WHB	Munt, Cottrell, Neilsen & Company	1	17	1931	First vehicle to re-use a fleet number. Withdrawn by 1934 and body reused.
Morris Commercial	Eden Motor Body	2	19	1934	Reused body from Thornycroft bus.
Morris Commercial	Munt, Cottrell, Neilsen & Company	3	23	1934	-
Morris Commercial	Munt, Cottrell, Neilsen & Company	4	17	1934	Reused body from Bedford WHB bus.
Leyland Cub KPZO2	Crawley Ridley & Co	5	25	1937	–
Leyland Cub KPZO2	Crawley Ridley & Co	6–7	25	1938	–
Leyland Lioness LTB1	WCCT	8–9	25	1940	Second-hand vehicles from Wellington City Transport. Withdrawn 1955–56.
Bedford WTB	WCCT	10	-	1945	-
Ford V8 3G	WCCT	11	34	1945	Withdrawn 1962.
Diamond T404	Crawley Ridley & Co	12	-	1945	Withdrawn 1955.
Leyland Tiger OPS1/1	NPCT	13–15	37	1947-1948	Half-cab buses. Bodies built in the council's workshops to plans supplied by WCCT. Withdrawn 1963–71.
AEC Regal IV 9821E	Crossley	16–17	42	1952	Part of an order with Christchurch; replaced two older buses (see above). Withdrawn from 1976
AEC Regal IV 9821E	Park Royal	18–22	42	1954	Ordered in 1953 to replace trams on the Fitzroy–Port route, again with Christchurch. Withdrawn from 1976
Bedford SB3	NZMB	23	35	1954	Withdrawn 1972.
AEC Regal IV 9821E	Park Royal	24–26	42	1955	2 preserved in various capacities. Withdrawn 1980–83.
AEC Reliance 470	Park Royal	8–9	42	1958	Part of an order with Christchurch. Withdrawn 1984–85.
AEC Reliance 470	NZMB	6–7	42	1962	Same design as Wellington's Mark II Reliances, but with longer, less austere bodywork. Withdrawn 1983.
Bedford SB5	–	10–11	37	1962	Withdrawn 1974.
AEC Reliance 590 2U2RA	NZMB	1–3	42	1967	Replaced trolleybuses; bodywork identical to Christchurch's 1963–64 Reliances. Bus 2 later converted to mobile library. Withdrawn 1986.
Bedford VAM70	NZMB	4	42	1967	Withdrawn 1983.
Bedford VAM70	NZMB	15	42	1970	Withdrawn 1982.
AEC Reliance 691 6U2RE	Hawke Commander	23	50	1972	Withdrawn 1987.
AEC Reliance 691 6U2RE	Hawke Commander	10–11	46	1974	Withdrawn 1987.
Mercedes-Benz O305	NZMB/VöV	16–19	46	1976	Added to Auckland order.
Leyland Leopard PSU3E/2R	Stratford Motor Bodies	21, 22	46	1978	Only example of Stratford bodywork.
Leyland Leopard PSU3E/2R	Hawke Hunter	5, 20	46	1978	Longer version of Wellington vehicles.
Leyland Leopard PSU3E/2R	NZMB/Hess	12, 14	45	1980	Bodywork identical to Dunedin's Leopards.
Volvo B58	NZMB/Hess	24	46	1980	Operated as the Hess bodywork demonstrator bus from 1978.
Volvo B58	NZMB/Hess	4, 15	45	1982	Bodywork built to the Dunedin profile.
Volvo B58	NZMB/Hess	26	45	1983	Bodywork built to the Dunedin profile.
Mercedes-Benz O305	Coachwork International/VöV	7–9	45	1985	#8 still operating as a motorhome
MAN SL202	Coachwork International/VöV Stadt 80	1–3, 6, 10–11	45	1986–1987	Last new vehicles purchased by the council. Ordered with Auckland, Wellington and Christchurch.

==== Livery evolution ====
Although individual vehicles varied, the fleet's liveries followed a broadly consistent progression:

Period	Livery	Identification and changes
1920s–1940s	Red lower bodywork, cream upper panels and roof	Borough coat of arms and NEW PLYMOUTH TRAMWAYS lettering on the sides.
Mid-1940s	Red and cream	White arrows, previously used on the tram fleet, introduced on buses.
Early 1950s	Red and cream	Lettering changed to NEW PLYMOUTH CITY TRANSPORT, as seen on the AEC Regal IV buses.
1960s	Red lower bodywork, with cream or red upper panels	Arrows removed first, followed by the lettering, leaving only the city coat of arms.
Early 1970s	Red, with varying upper panels	Coat of arms briefly replaced by a small NEW PLYMOUTH CITY TRANSPORT SERVICES inscription.
1976–1991	Green lower bodywork, white upper panels and roof	Introduced with the Mercedes-Benz O305 buses. City coat of arms reinstated, except on the final vehicle delivered, which carried the new district council logo.

The green-and-white livery remained in use until the fleet was sold in 1991.

==== Routes ====
Bus routes expanded steadily as the borough developed. By 1927, services were operating to Avenue Road, Vogeltown–Frankleigh Park, and Upper Westown via Vaele’s Estate. In 1934, a new service along Devon Street West to South Road (via Lorna and Doone Streets) was also introduced. Post-war routes included a service to Mangorei Road by 1947, Fitzroy and Port services in 1954 (later extended into Spotswood), Westown and Hurdon services in 1967 as well the later routes to Pembroke Street and Highlands Park.

In addition to regular town services, a daily observation bus for tourists ran from the 1930s through to the 1970s.

Bus services initially operated from the corner of Brougham and Devon Streets. Congestion led in 1945 to the building of a new bus depot opposite the Railway station in Rangi Street. Initially allowing for buses to lay over between services off-street, it eventually became the main bus depot for the city, allowing buses to be based in town instead of from the tram depot in Fitzroy. The first services started using the new depot in November 1945.

Route numbers were not initially displayed on vehicles, which instead showed only their destination on the blind. Although route numbers appeared in timetables by at least 1952, they do not appear to have been displayed on buses until the late 1950s or early 1960s.

The following table lists known destination signs alongside their associated route numbers. Not all destinations were in use at the same time, and routes were added or altered as the city grew. Route numbers also did not always represent self-contained services: timetables show that buses were frequently interworked between neighbouring routes, operating outward under one route number and returning via another. This occurred on routes 6, 7 and 14 serving Omata Road and Westown, and routes 1, 3 and 5 serving the linked Brooklands, Vogeltown and Rata Street services. Buses terminating in the central city generally displayed the destination CITY.

Route	Destination blind	Notes
1	BROOKLANDS	
1A	HIGHLANDS PK	
2	—	Destination unknown
3	VOGELTOWN	
4	FRANKLEY ROAD / FERNDALE	
5	RATA STREET	
6	OMATA RD	
7	OMATA RD	Excluding Lyn Street
8	FITZROY / PORT	Via Ngamotu Road and South Road
9	MANGOREI RD / MERRILANDS	Direct
10	FRANKLEIGH PARK	
11	MANGOREI RD / MERRILANDS	Via Waiwaka Terrace
12	FITZROY / PORT	Reverse of route 8
13	FITZROY / PORT	Direct service, not via Ngamotu Road or South Road
14	WESTOWN / WESTOWN & HOSPITAL / HURDON	
15	MERRILANDS	Via Awanui Street and Cumberland Street
16	PEMBROKE	
—	OBSERVATION	New Plymouth sightseeing service
—	PICTURE BUS	Late-night service after cinema sessions
—	RUGBY PARK	Sports service
—	RACECOURSE	
—	AVENUE ROAD	Now Coronation Avenue
—	SMART ROAD	Route number uncertain

==== 1990 reorganisation ====
By 1990 the service was operating as New Plymouth District Transport, the council having changed from city to district status in 1989. In 1990 routes were reviewed and service patterns adjusted, with weekend services removed from some routes and other routes rearranged.

Most routes operated separately from points in the central city, but the Fitzroy and Spotswood/Port services ran as a continuous loop through the city under separate route numbers. Variations on the main routes were marked with a letter suffix, such as 7A (Omata Road) and 16A (Merrilands), while minor variations, such as the Riversdale Drive loop on Merrilands services and the Princes Street loop on Fitzroy services, were noted in timetables without a letter. Some route pairs operated as loops operating in opposite directions: the Ferndale routes 4 and 5, and Spotswood routes 11 and 12 ran as anticlockwise and clockwise pairs.

On weekdays the main routes ran from between 6 and 7 am until 7.30 pm, with extra services until 10.30 pm on Fridays, and secondary routes from 7 am to 5.30 pm. Main routes ran about every 15 minutes at peak and every 30 minutes off-peak, and secondary routes about every 30 and 60 minutes. Saturday services ran from 8 am to 7.30 pm, at least hourly, and there were no Sunday or public holiday services. Because weekend patronage was lower and operating costs higher, Saturday services used linked routes: Fitzroy-Port-Spotswood services included a timetabled spur to the Merrilands terminus at Smith Road; Vogeltown, Frankleigh Park and Brooklands services were combined, generally running out via Vogeltown (occasionally extended to Rata Street) and returning via Frankleigh Park or Brooklands, or occasionally the reverse; and Hurdon and Omata Road (Marfell) services alternated between running out via Hurdon and back via Omata Road, and the reverse. About 900,000 passengers were carried in the year to 30 June 1991.

1990-1991 NPCT Bus Routes
Route	Destination blind	Notes
1	Brooklands	Via Coronation Avenue
2	Brooklands	Outbound only – returns via Brooklands Road, Victoria Road, and Shortland St to Carrington Road, travelling on to City.
3	Vogeltown	
3A	Rata St	Via Vogeltown (replaced dedicated Rata St route)
4	Ferndale	Outbound via Frankley Road. City via Pembroke St, Tavistock St, and Clawton St.
5	Ferndale	Outbound via Pembroke St, Tavistock St, and Clawton St. Citybound via Frankley Road
6	Omata Rd	Via Lynmouth
6A	Omata Rd	Via Lynmouth and Oranga St
7	Omata Rd	Direct - does not travel via Lynmouth
7A	Omata Rd	Direct - does not travel via Lynmouth. Travels via Oranga St.
8	Highlands Park	
9	Not used	
10	Frankleigh Park	
11	Spotswood	Outbound via Port
11A	Spotswood	Outbound via Port and then via Whalers Gate (Triverton Cres)
12	Spotswood	Inbound via Port
12A	Spotswood	Via Whalers Gate (Triverton Cres)
13	Fitzroy	Via Princes St on selected journeys
13A	Fitzroy	Services Glen Avon as part of the Fitzroy service (replaced dedicated Smart Road route) Via Princes St on selected journeys
14	Hurdon	Travels to/from Hospital on specified journeys
15	Merrilands	Outbound Via Mangorei Road Inbound Via Mangorei Road and (occasionally) Riversdale Dr
15A	Merrilands	Outbound following R15 then via Awanui St & Cumberland St to Smith Road
16	Merrilands	Outbound Via Ngaio St, Paynters Avenue, and Rimu St to Mangorei Road terminus at Smith Road Inbound via Rimu St, Paynters Avenue, and Waiwaka Tce to Northgate and on to City.
16A	Merrilands	Outbound to Smith Road following R16 via Awanui St

== Post-1991 operations ==
On 30 July 1991, New Plymouth City Council sold its bus fleet and operations to Gold Star Bus Lines. Gold Star was a Hamilton-based company that offered to run the New Plymouth services as well. The fleet was split between New Plymouth and Hamilton depots. However, the company was placed into liquidation a few months later. Buses were progressively sold off in late 1991 and early 1992 to pay down the company's debt.

In 1994, the council-owned bus depot at Rangi Street was sold and demolished to make way for the Richmond Centre shopping complex.

=== Subsequent Services ===
For the subsequent history of bus operations in New Plymouth after the closure of New Plymouth City Transport and Gold Star Bus Lines see Public transport in New Plymouth.

== Preservation ==
Although most of the New Plymouth City Transport fleet was sold off following withdrawal, a small number of vehicles have made their way into preservation. None of the trams remains complete, but one Birney body is held in storage, alongside two of the four trolleybuses and two Regal IV diesel buses (in various states of completeness). These vehicles are preserved by heritage groups across New Zealand, as listed below:

Type	Vehicle	Fleet Number	Fate	Location
Tram	Birney	8	Body in storage	Tramways Whanganui Trust, Whanganui
Trolley bus	Crossley	1	Preserved / Storage	Kapiti Coast Electric Tramway, Paekākāriki
Trolley Bus	Crossley	3	Preserved / Operable	Ferrymead Heritage Park, Christchurch
Diesel Bus	AEC Regal IV	24	Chassis only / Operable	Omnibus Society of New Zealand, Manunui
Diesel Bus	AEC Regal IV	26	Under restoration / Operable	Omnibus Society of New Zealand, Manunui

== See also ==
=== Related Topics ===
- Trams in New Zealand
- Trolleybuses in New Zealand

=== Maps showing bus routes over the years ===
- 1945 map showing tram and bus routes
- 1949 map showing tram and bus routes
- 1952 map showing tram, bus & trolley bus routes
- 1960 map showing bus, trolley bus and observation bus routes
- 1977 map showing bus routes
- 1987 map showing bus routes
