= Superior (bus manufacturer) =

- Industry: Bus manufacturing
- Founded: 1964
- Defunct: 1996
- Headquarters: Brendale, Australia

Superior Industries was an Australian bus body builder in Brendale, Brisbane.

== History ==
Superior Industries was founded as a builder of truck and ambulance bodies in Virginia. Having diversified into bus bodying, in May 1969 it moved to larger premises in Vauxhall Street, Virginia.

In the late 1960s a large number of Leyland Leopards and in the mid-1980s some Leyland Tigers were bodied, but most bodies were mostly constructed on lighter chassis from Bedford and Ford and later Hino and Mercedes-Benz.

In 1977, Brighton Motor Body Company was acquired. In 1980, Superior moved to a new factory in Brendale. Superior ceased trading in 1996 by which time it had bodied about 450 buses.
