= Dennis Lancet =

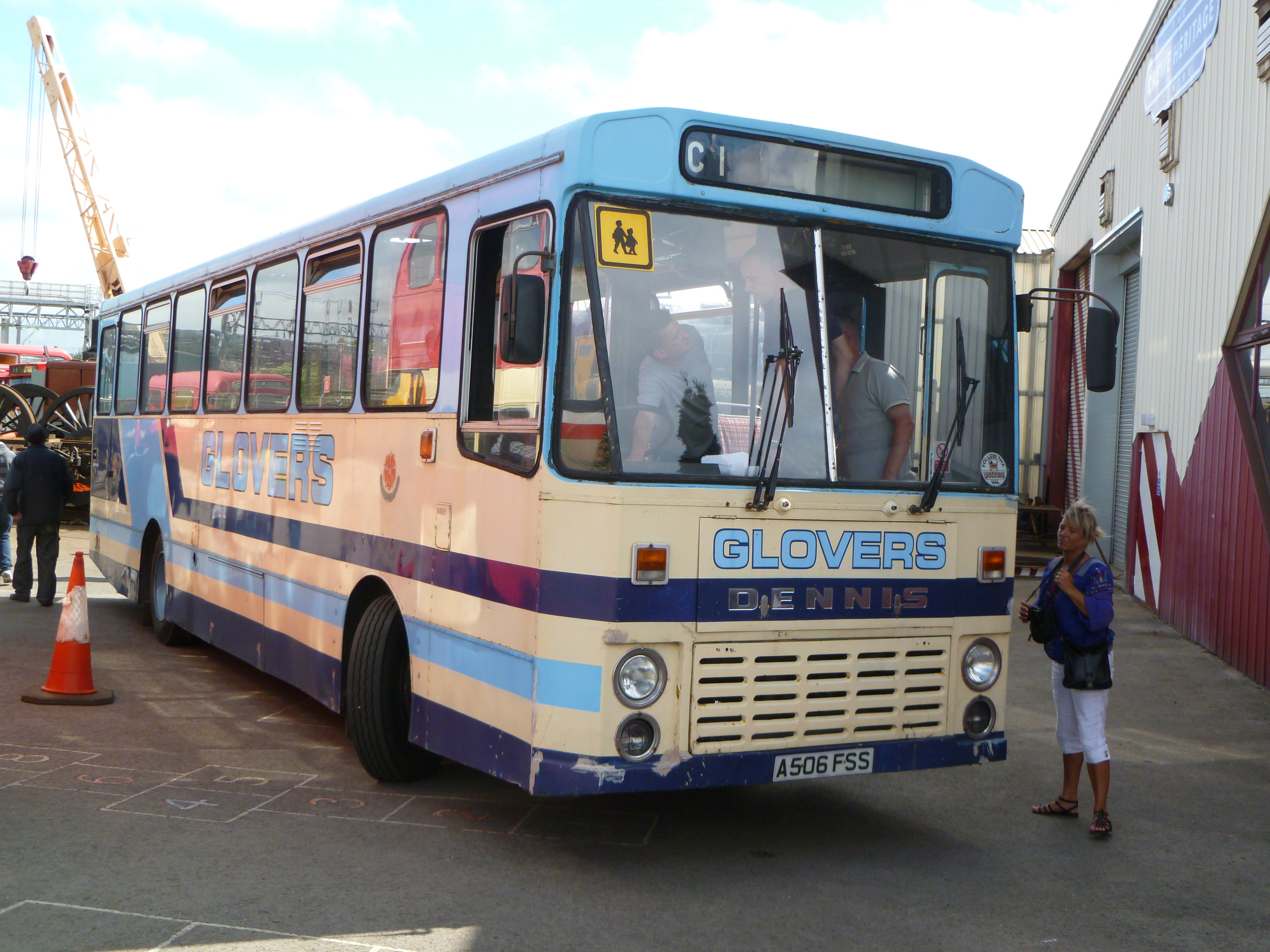
- Alexander bodied Dennis Lancet

Overview
- Manufacturer: Dennis
- Production: 1981-91

Body and chassis
- Floor type: Step entrance

Powertrain
- Engine: Perkins T6.354, V8 540 (Leyland 402, 411)
- Transmission: Allison AT545

Chronology
- Successor: Dennis Javelin

The Dennis Lancet was a lightweight underfloor-engined chassis manufactured by Dennis during the 1980s.

The Lancet nameplate was previously carried by a front-engined chassis, and later, in the 1950s and early 1960s, to the underfloor-engined Lancet UF.

== History ==
The Lancet was launched in 1981. It was mainly used as the basis of a bus or coach, although some were bodied for other uses, mainly as mobile libraries.

At a time before the advent of low floor buses, when wheelchair access required the fitment of a chairlift, a few bus operators and councils bought Dennis Lancets with this feature. Leicester Citybus and West Midlands Passenger Transport Executive had three and two respectively with Duple Dominant Bus bodywork.

Other UK customers for the Lancet included Tillingbourne Bus Company, Merseyside PTE (with ten, the largest British fleet), Northern Scottish, Blackpool Transport, Portsmouth, Merthyr Tydfil and Taff-Ely.

Around 87 chassis were built. Nearly a third of them were exported, to Bermuda and South Africa. The Lancet was replaced by the Dennis Javelin.
