= Dennis Dorchester =

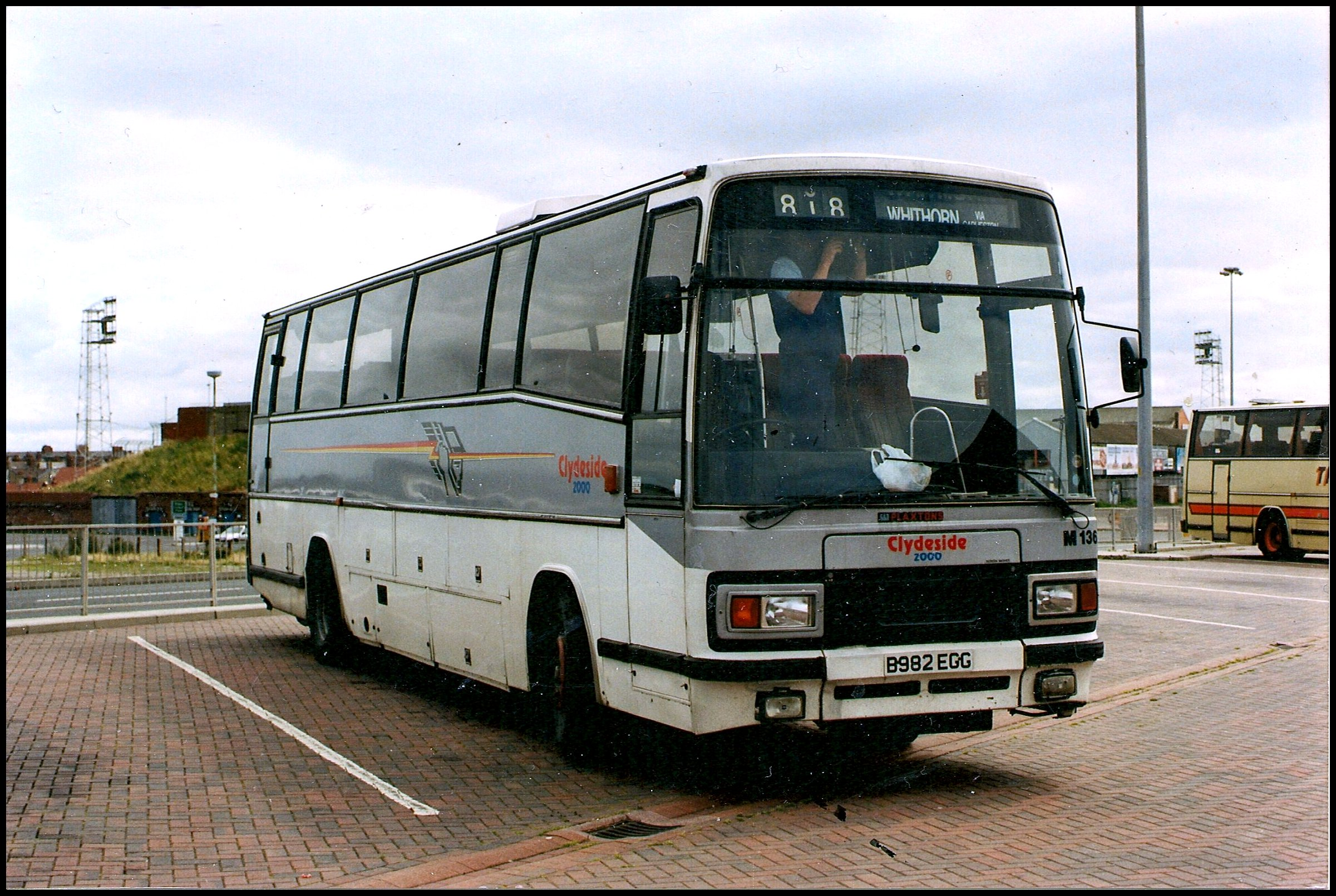
- Plaxton Paramount bodied Dennis Dorchester

Overview
- Manufacturer: Dennis
- Production: 1983–1988
- Assembly: Guildford

Body and chassis
- Floor type: Step entrance

Powertrain
- Engine: Gardner 6HLXCT

The Dennis Dorchester was a mid-engined heavy-duty single deck coach chassis manufactured by Dennis in small numbers between 1983 and 1988. Designed as a premium underfloor mid-engine coach chassis, it was unveiled at the 1982 Motor Show. It was aimed at operators who had purchased the Seddon Pennine 7.

Of the 67 built, 44 were bought by Scottish Bus Group subsidiaries Western Scottish, Central Scottish and Clydeside Scottish. These consisted of 23 with Plaxton Paramount coach bodywork, and 21 with Alexander bodywork, with each of the three T-type variants represented — five each of the TS service bus and TE express semi-coach, and eleven of the TC full coach. One was exported to South Africa.

Leicester City Transport bought three Dorchester coaches with Plaxton Paramount bodywork, but sold them fairly quickly to Kingston-upon-Hull City Transport, which also bought one new. South Yorkshire Transport also took on three similar vehicles.

Of the Dorchester customers in the independent sector, Geoff Amos of Northamptonshire included three high-capacity bus versions among their five examples, two with Wadham Stringer bodywork and one with Reeve Burgess bodywork, all with 71 seats. Tillingbourne Bus Company also purchased two 61-seat Wadham Stringer-bodied buses.

Other body manufacturers for the Dorchester were Duple (five, including the sole export Dorchester, for South Africa), Caetano (two coaches which made up the remainder of the Amos contingent), and Berkhof (one vehicle).
