= AEC Reliance =

British single-decker bus

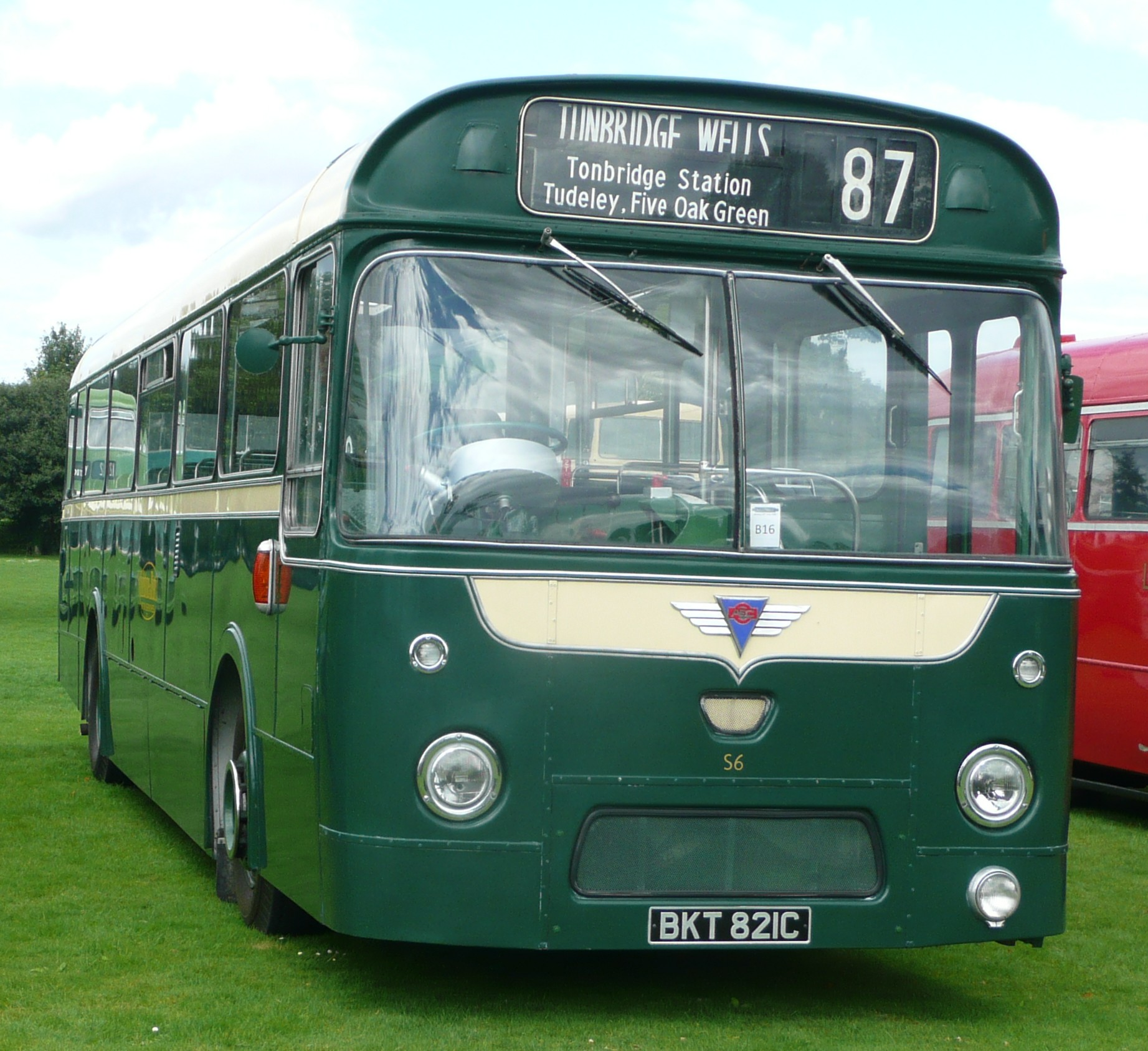
- Preserved Maidstone & District Marshall bodied AEC Reliance in July 2008

Overview
- Manufacturer: AEC
- Production: 1954–1979
- Assembly: Southall, England

Body and chassis
- Doors: 1 or 2
- Floor type: Step entrance

Powertrain
- Engine: AEC AH470; AEC AH505; AEC AH590; AEC AH691; AEC AH760
- Capacity: 7.7 litres 8.1 litres 9.7 litres 11.3 litres 12.4 litres
- Transmission: AEC manual AEC Monocontrol; ZF synchromesh

Dimensions
- Length: 9.1 or 11.0 or 11.9 m (30 or 36 or 39 ft)
- Width: 2.5 m (8 ft 2 in)
- Height: 3 m (9 ft 10 in)

Chronology
- Successor: Leyland Leopard

The AEC Reliance was a mid-underfloor mounted engined single-decker bus and coach chassis manufactured by AEC between 1953 and 1979. The name had previously been used between 1928 and 1931 for another single-decker bus chassis.

== History ==
Two prototypes were completed in 1953, one with Duple coach bodywork and one with Park Royal bus bodywork. Production vehicles entered service from 1954. The last Reliance entered service in 1981.

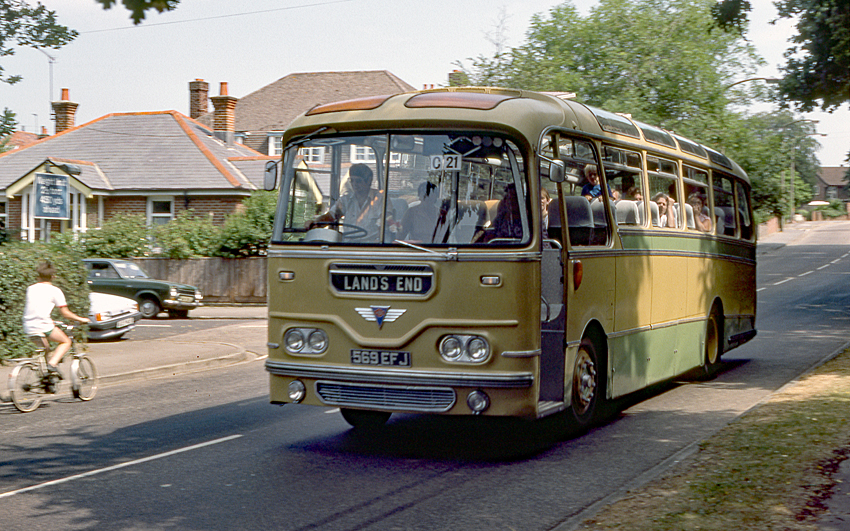
Greenslade AEC Reliance coach

Following successive changes to Construction & Use regulations, the maximum length of the Reliance was increased twice from the original 30 feet: firstly, to permit an overall length of 36 feet from 1962; and later, to permit a length of 39 feet.

Various AEC engines were fitted during the chassis's production, including the 7.7-litre AH470, 8.1-litre AH505, 9.6-litre AH590, 11.3-litre AH691 and 12.4-litre AH760. Transmissions fitted to the Reliance include an AEC synchromesh gearbox, AEC Monocontrol semi-automatic epicyclic transmission, and ZF 6 speed crash-gearbox.

The Reliance had the Leyland Tiger Cub and, from 1959, the Leyland Leopard as its major competitors throughout its life, even though they were built under the same ownership from 1962 onwards. After production of the Reliance ended, Leyland offered ZF synchromesh as an option for the Leopard, although the Volvo B58 and other imported buses later won a number of customers' orders.

== Exports ==
=== Australia ===
In Australia, Canberra Bus Service purchased ninety-two 470s and twenty-eight 505s while Brisbane City Council purchased three 470s and forty 590s. McVicar's Bus Service, Sydney operated a total of 44.

=== New Zealand ===
AEC Reliance buses were common across New Zealand, with many local authorities purchasing them. These include:

- Christchurch Transport Board - 70 Reliance 470s
- Dunedin City Transport - 12 Reliance 407s
- Gisborne City Council - 6 Reliance 470, 3 Reliance 505
- New Plymouth City Transport - 4 Reliance 470s, 3 Replance 590s, 4 Reliance 691s
- Wellington City Transport - 86 Reliance 470s
