= Duple =

Duple may refer to:

== Musical measure ==
- Metre (music) the rhythmic structure of music
- Duple and quadruple metre a musical metre characterized by a primary division of 2 beats to the bar

== Coachbuilding ==
- Duple Metsec former British coachbuilders acquired by Duple Coachbuilders
- Duple Coachbuilders a coachbuilder that acquired Duple Metsec, later to become Hestair Duple
- Duple Dominant an intercity coach bodywork design
- Duple Dartline a single-decker bus body
- Duple 425 a coach design built by Hestair Duple in the late 1980s
- Dennis Dart a bus designed by Hestair Group, the owner of Duple and Dennis
- Hestair Group who absorbed Duple Coachbuilders and Dennis
