= Dennis Falcon =

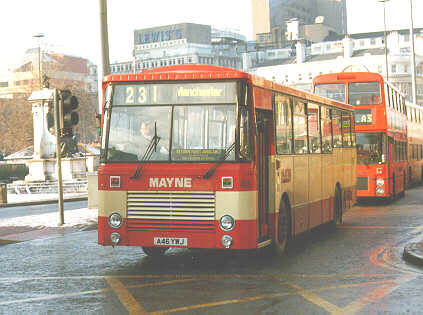
- Mayne Coaches Marshall bodied Dennis Falcon

Overview
- Manufacturer: Dennis
- Production: 1981–1993
- Assembly: Guildford, England

Body and chassis
- Doors: 1 or 2
- Floor type: Step entrance

Powertrain
- Engine: Gardner 6HLXB; Gardner 6HLXCT; Perkins; Daimler-Benz
- Transmission: Voith DIWA851

Dimensions
- Length: 9.0m to 12.0m
- Width: 2.5m
- Height: 3.0m or 4.4m

Chronology
- Successor: Dennis Lance

The Dennis Falcon was a rear-engined single-decker bus, double-decker bus and coach chassis manufactured by Dennis between 1981 and 1993. It was mostly built as a single-decker bus, although some express coaches and a small number of double-decker buses were also produced. The total number built was 139, plus one development chassis.

== Design ==
The Falcon was closely derived from the Dennis Dominator, the front half of the chassis being identical. The original horizontal-engined Falcon H had a layout recalling that of the Bristol RE with the longitudinally-mounted Gardner engine driving forward above the Dennis-built portal rear axle to a Voith gearbox and reversing unit which then took drive rearward into the driving-head of the axle. The later Falcon HC had a more orthodox continuous driveline, resembling that of the Seddon Pennine RU, the C (for continuous drive) denoted the Voith transmission close-coupled to the Gardner engine with a short propeller shaft taking drive into a straight Kirkstall spiral-bevel double-reduction rear axle. For these types the frame was raised aft of the rear axle to provide clearance for the underslung engine.

The Falcon V, with Daimler-Benz V6 engines in the double-decker buses and Perkins V8 engines in the coaches, was even closer in frame-concept to the Dominator.

== Single decker buses ==
Single-decker buses were based on the Falcon H and HC chassis. Six English municipal operators bought Dennis Falcon single-decker buses between 1981 and 1993:

Operator	Bodywork	Number of Vehicles	Years
Ipswich Buses	East Lancs (18), Northern Counties (7)	25	1983-1989
Leicester Citybus	Duple (7), East Lancs (9), Northern Counties (7)	23	1981-1993
Hartlepool	Wadham Stringer (6), Northern Counties (6)	12	1983-1985
Chesterfield Transport	East Lancs (4), Marshall (5)	9	1983-1984
Grimsby-Cleethorpes	Wadham Stringer	4	1983
Hyndburn	East Lancs	2	1984-1985

Leicester bought the first Falcon in 1981, with Duple Dominant Bus bodywork, and added six more between 1983 and 1984. Despite selling these to Thamesdown Transport in 1987, Leicester later purchased sixteen more Falcons between 1991 and 1993, including the last Falcon built.

Hartlepool Borough Transport bought twelve dual door examples. Six with Wadham Stringer bodies in 1983 and the other six with Northern Counties bodies in 1985. They remained operational into the days of Stagecoach Hartlepool buses.

National Bus Company subsidiary Alder Valley added one Dennis Falcon HC to its fleet in 1983, with Wadham Stringer bodywork of semi-coach specification.

In 1990 and 1993, three British Bus subsidiaries purchased Falcon single-decker buses:

Company	Bodywork	Number of Vehicles	Years
London & Country	East Lancs	10	1990
North Western	East Lancs	8	1990
Midland Red North	East Lancs	9	1992-1993

== Coaches ==
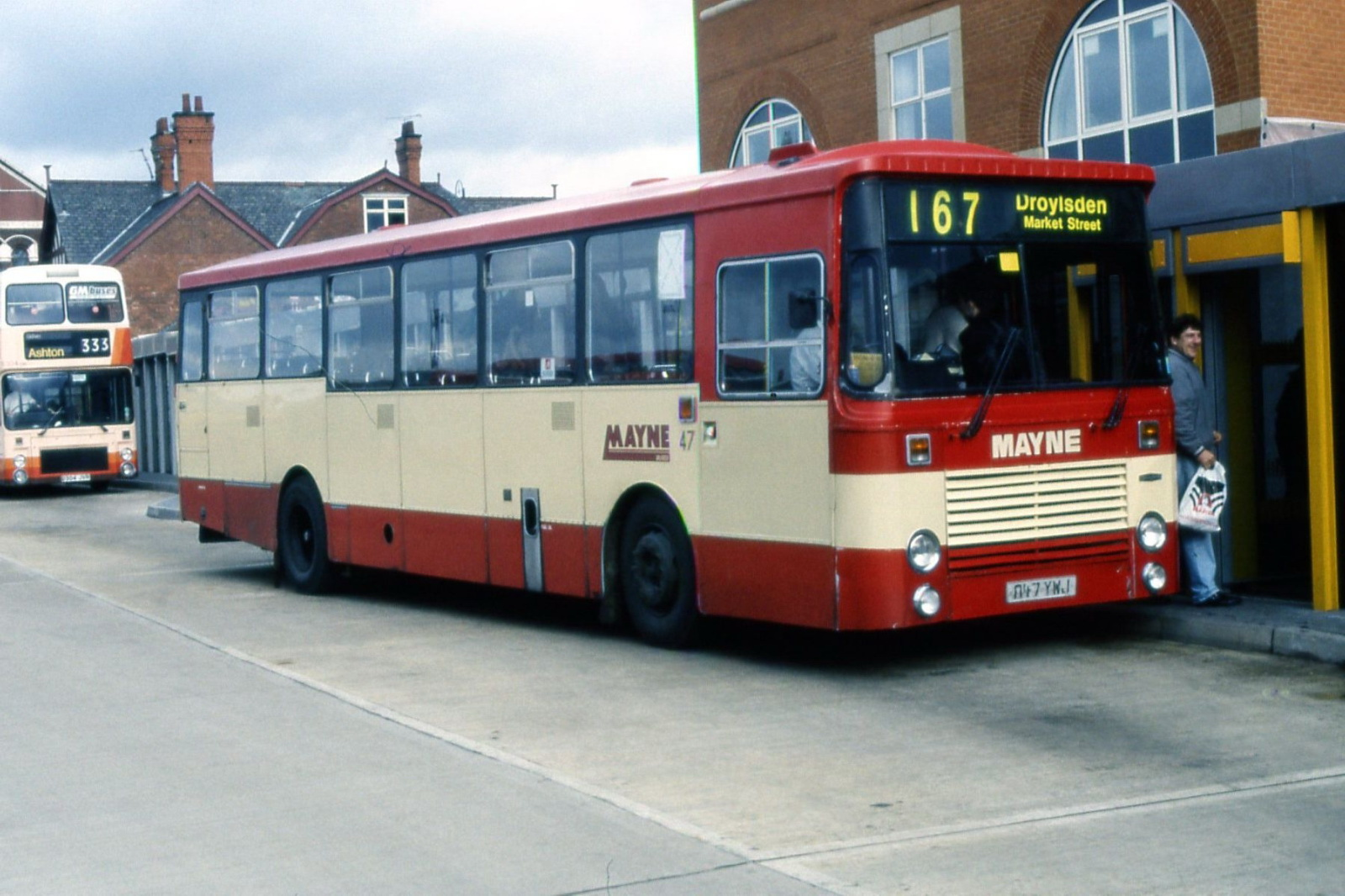
Mayne Coaches Marshall bodied Falcon at Ashton bus station

In 1982, the National Bus Company bought 10 express coaches with Duple Goldiner IV bodywork to National Express Rapide specification. These were based on the Falcon V chassis. They were split between Western National (5), Yorkshire Traction (2), National Travel (West) (2) and West Yorkshire RCC (1). But they proved unreliable and did not last very long in National Express service.

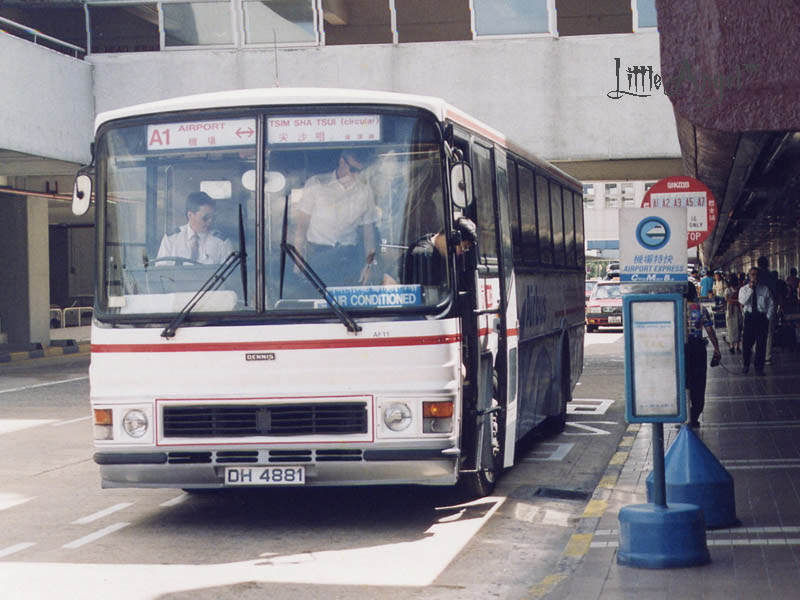
Kowloon Motor Bus Duple Laser bodied Falcon at Kai Tak Airport

Kowloon Motor Bus purchased 20 Duple Laser bodied coaches based on the Falcon HC chassis in 1985/86 for airport express services in Hong Kong. The last was withdrawn in 2001.

== Double-deckers ==
Only six Falcon V double-decker buses were built. The first was used as a demonstrator. Two examples with East Lancs bodywork went to Nottingham City Transport in 1982 as part of their evaluation of the various new generation double-decker buses then available. High noise levels were one criticism made against them. The final three, with Northern Counties bodywork, went to Greater Manchester Transport in 1984.

== Successor ==
The Falcon was replaced by the Dennis Lance.
