= Duple Calypso =

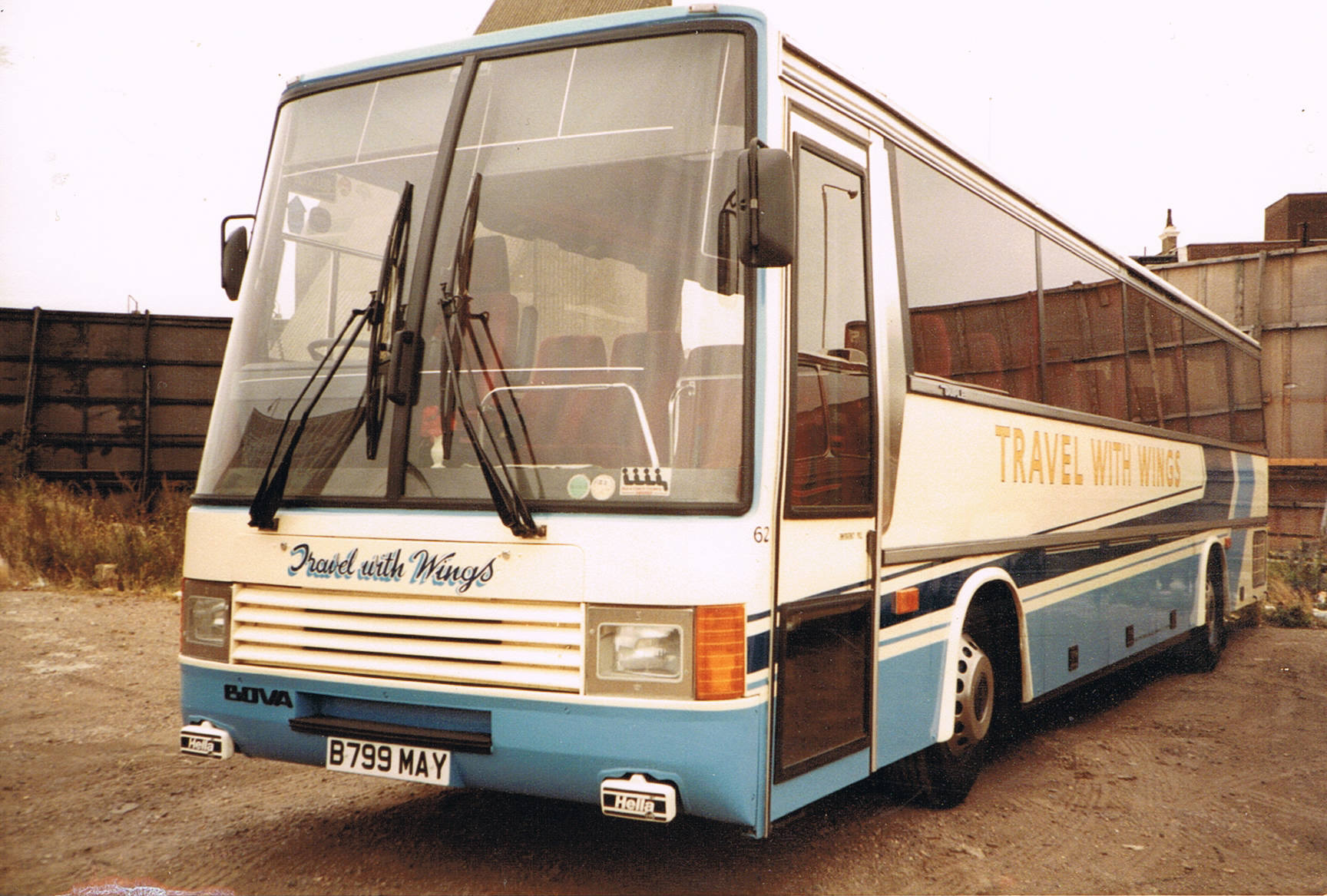
- 1984 Duple Calypso

Overview
- Manufacturer: Duple
- Production: 1983–1984

Body and chassis
- Doors: 1 door
- Floor type: Step entrance
- Chassis: Bova Europa
- Related: Duple Caribbean; Duple Laser

Dimensions
- Length: 12 metres

Chronology
- Predecessor: n/a
- Successor: Duple 425

The Duple Calypso was a design of semi-integral coach built by Duple between 1983 and 1984 using running gear from the Bova Europa.

== History ==
In the early 1980s the British coach market underwent considerable change, putting pressure on the established British coachbuilding firms which had previously dominated the market. In the 1970s the great majority of coaches sold in the UK had comprised a British-built chassis with separately assembled bodywork by one of the two dominant domestic coachbuilders, Duple and Plaxton. The highest sales volumes were achieved by lightweight chassis such as the Bedford Y series and Ford R series, and even imported chassis such as the Volvo B58 usually carried Duple or Plaxton coachwork. However, the 1980s saw a move away from lightweights towards heavier and more sophisticated designs, increasingly supplied by foreign chassis and bodywork manufacturers. Some of the foreign coaches now selling in Britain were of integral construction, and Duple wished to produce an integral design of its own to compete more effectively with these. The first attempts were a pair of prototypes built in 1983, one of which was a semi-integral variant of the Duple Caribbean body built on German Auwärter Neoplan N716 running gear, which remained a one-off. The other prototype employed Dutch BOVA running gear within a unique style of semi-integral body known as the Duple Calypso, and a further 50 production vehicles of this type were built for the 1984 season.

The styling of the Calypso was a hybrid of the contemporary Duple Laser and Caribbean coach bodies which were produced in larger numbers. It was of intermediate height, being closer in height to the Laser but featuring bonded glazing like the Caribbean. However, while the Calypso had twin headlamps and a wide grille, most contemporary Laser and Caribbean bodies had quad headlamps and a small chrome grille (although the Calypso headlights/grille could be specified as an option).

In June 1983 Duple had been sold to the Hestair Group, which had previously acquired the British chassis manufacturer Dennis Brothers of Guildford. Duple was renamed Hestair Duple, and rather than persisting with semi-integrals built on third party running gear it was decided to develop a fully integral coach with running units from sister company Hestair Dennis. As a result the contract with BOVA was not renewed after the 1984 season and instead the fully integral Duple 425 was developed as a replacement for the Calypso.

== See also ==
- Leyland Royal Tiger
- MCW Metroliner
- List of buses
