= Duple 300 Series =

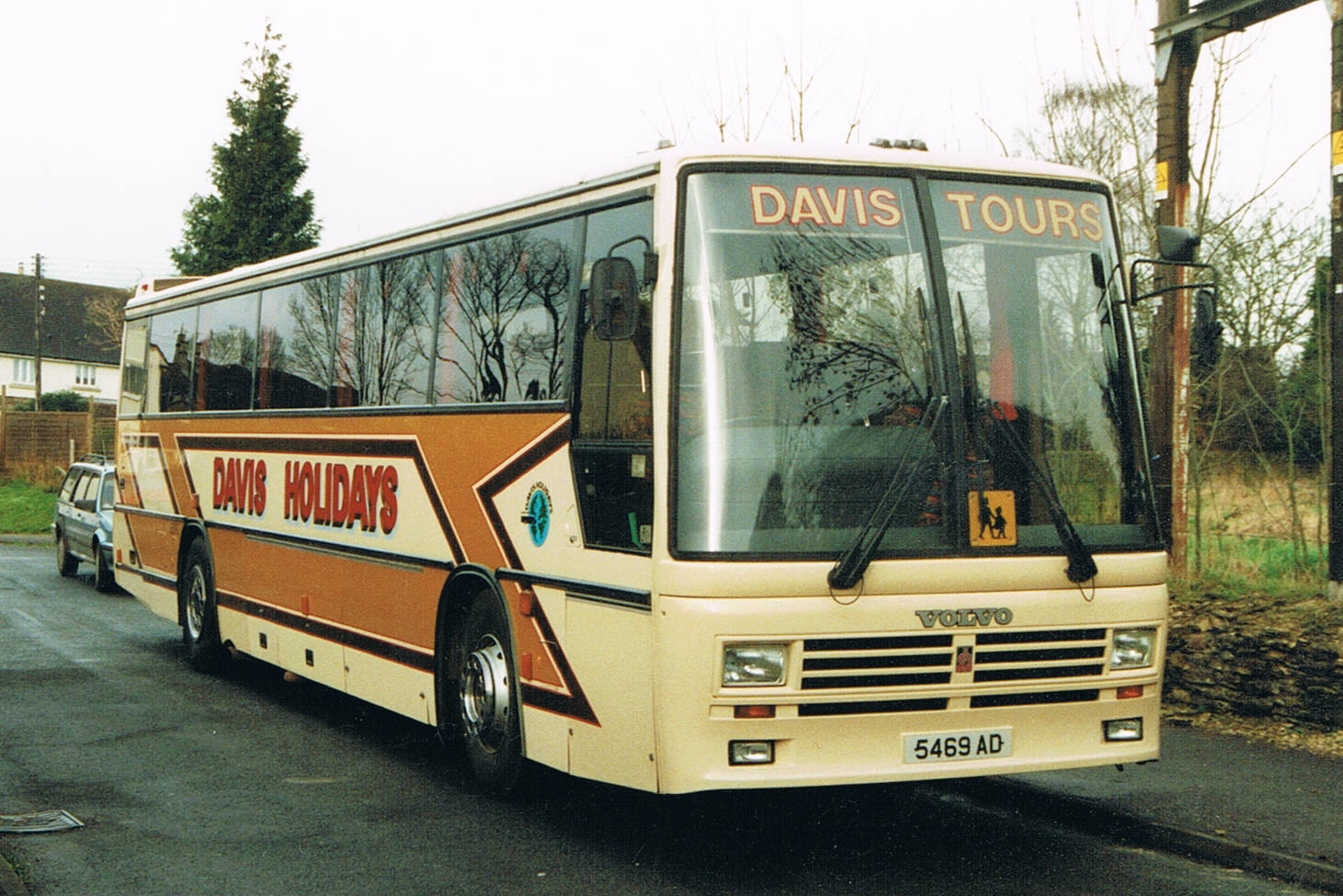
- Duple 320 body on Volvo B10M chassis

Overview
- Manufacturer: Duple
- Also called: Duple 300; Duple 320 / Plaxton 321; Duple 340
- Production: 1985–1989

Body and chassis
- Doors: 1
- Floor type: Step entrance
- Chassis: Bedford YNT & YNV; DAF MB200 & MB230; DAF SB2305; Dennis Javelin; Leyland Leopard (rebodied chassis); Leyland Tiger; Scania K93; Volvo B10M

Dimensions
- Length: 8,500 mm (27 ft 10 5/8 in); 11,000 mm (36 ft 1 1/8 in); 12,000 mm (39 ft 4 1/2 in)

Chronology
- Predecessor: Duple Dominant Bus; Duple Laser; Duple Caribbean
- Successor: none

The Duple 300 Series were a range of bus and coach bodywork built by Duple between 1985 and 1989. The range comprised the 3,000 mm (9 ft 10 1/8 in) high Duple 300 service bus, the 3,200 mm (10 ft 6 in) high Duple 320 coach, and the taller 3,400 mm (11 ft 1 7/8 in) high Duple 340 coach. The 320 and 340 coaches were announced at the Bus and Coach Show at Earls Court in September 1985 as replacements for the previous Laser and Caribbean. Deliveries of these models commenced in 1986, whilst the 300 bus was launched in 1987 as a replacement for the Dominant Bus. After Duple closed down the designs were sold to Plaxton and a small number of additional 320 bodies were built as the Plaxton 321.

== Variants ==
=== Duple 320 ===
When it was launched the 320 was available on 11-metre long Bedford YNT and Leyland Tiger chassis and 12m long Bedford YNV, Leyland Tiger, DAF MB200 / MB230 and Volvo B10M chassis. Subsequently, a few old 11 and 12 m Leyland Leopard chassis received replacement Duple 320 bodies, and a batch of 12m 320s was built on rear-engined Scania K93 chassis in 1988. However, the most popular chassis for the 320 would prove to be the Dennis Javelin. At the time of its launch in 1986 both Dennis and Duple were under common ownership by the Hestair Group so the Duple 320 body was the obvious choice for Javelin prototypes. After series production began in 1988 the Javelin/320 combination accounted for about one third of Duple's coach output. In addition to the standard 11- and 12-metre versions, the Dennis Javelin was also available as an 8.5 m midicoach.

=== Duple 340 ===
The taller Duple 340 was intended to be more upmarket than the 320 and was only available on 12-metre long heavyweight chassis. Initially these were the mid-engined DAF MB200 / MB230, Leyland Tiger and Volvo B10M and the rear-engined DAF SB2305, but the Scania K93 also became available in 1988. The 320 and 340 shared similar front ends and windscreens, but the 340 could be distinguished by its greater height, with the side windows being stepped up slightly behind the door/cab window and a curved front roof dome over the cab.

=== Duple 300 ===
Although primarily a coach manufacturer, Duple also manufactured bus bodies on a limited scale. The 300 was introduced two years after the coach versions of the series and was available on 11 m Dennis Javelin, Leyland Tiger and Volvo B10M chassis, selling in small quantities only. The largest customer was Hutchison's Coaches of Overtown, Lanarkshire, which purchased 15 Volvos. The 300 had little visual similarity to the coach models apart from the use of similar front grille/headlamps and rear window.

=== Plaxton 321 ===
Duple had struggled with a declining market share throughout the 1980s and the business was closed down at the end of the 1989 season. The rights to manufacture the 300 series bodies and the Duple 425 integral were purchased by Plaxton, which planned to restart production of the former Duple range at its own Scarborough factory and its French subsidiary Carrosserie Lorraine. In the event these plans were thwarted by declining economic conditions which limited the demand for new coaches. Indeed, the last Dennis Javelin/Duple 320 built for dealer stock was not registered until 1993 (K326ANC). Production of the 300 and 340 did not resume, but Plaxton did re-engineer the 320 to include standard Plaxton parts, in which form it could be sold at a lower price than the equivalent Plaxton Paramount 3200 III. A single batch of 25 12-metre Leyland Tigers was bodied at Scarborough in 1991 and sold through the Yeates coach dealership as the Plaxton 321, but no further examples were built.

== Gallery ==
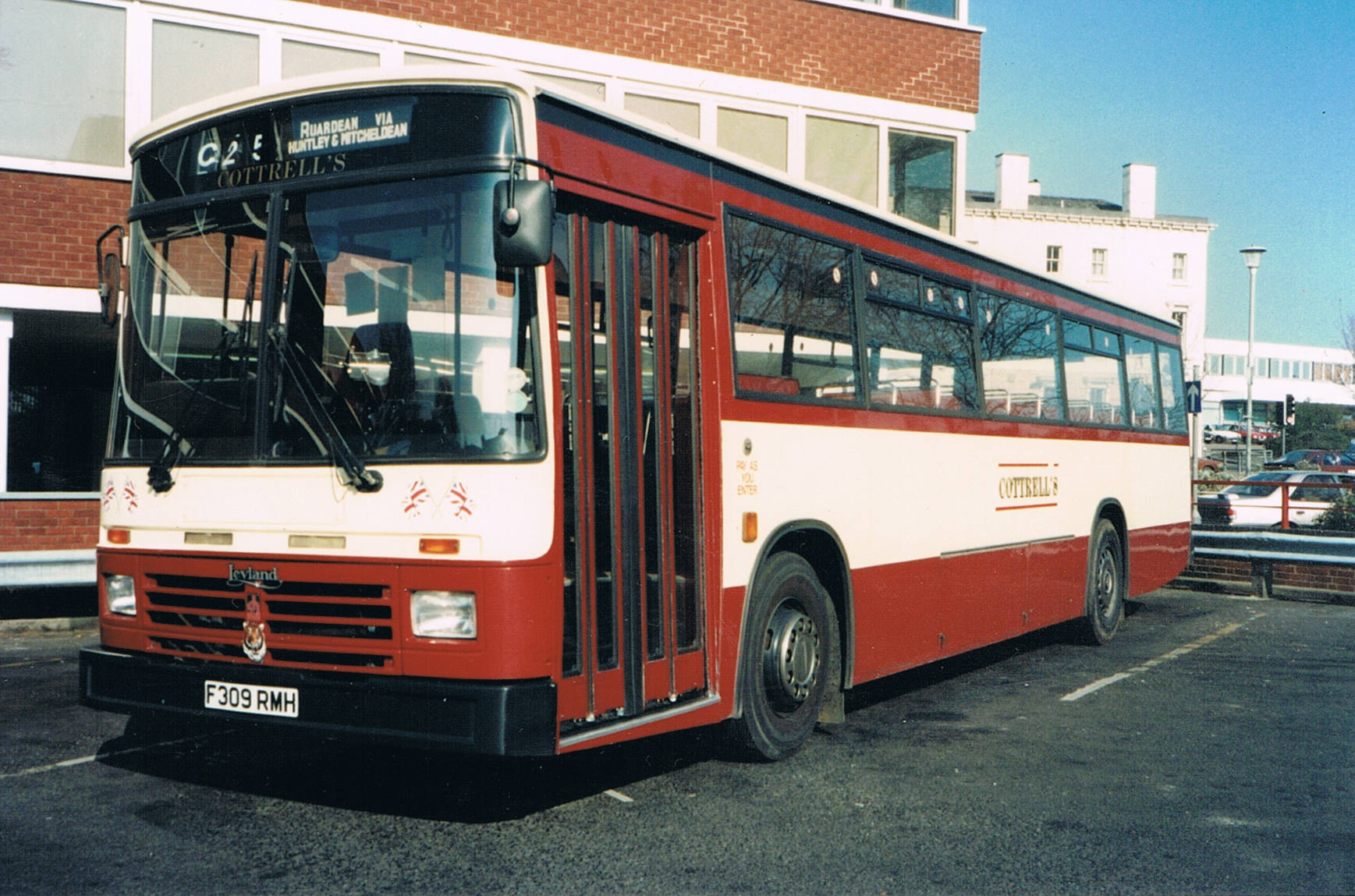
Duple 300 on Leyland Tiger chassis

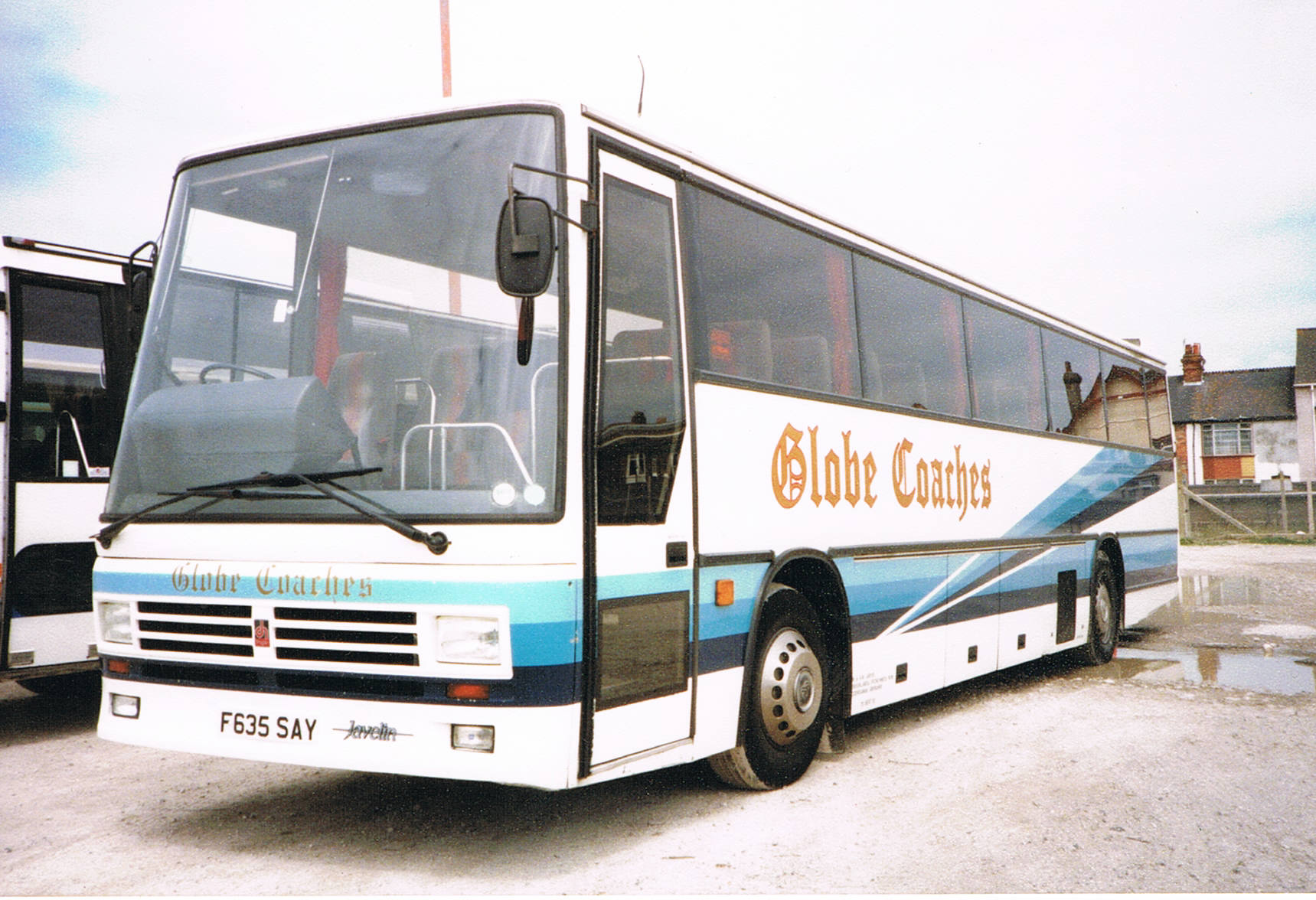
Duple 320 on 12-metre Dennis Javelin chassis

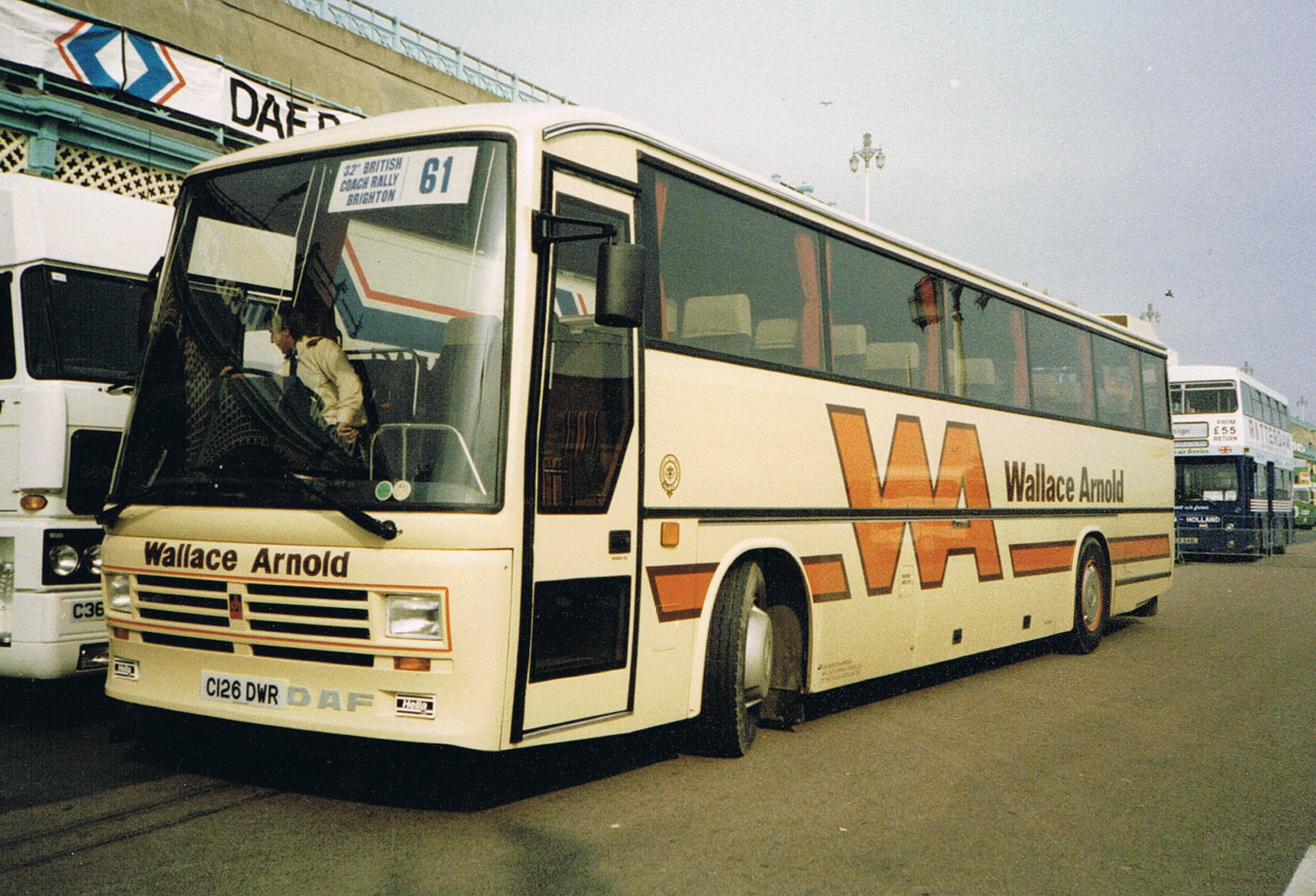
Duple 340 on DAF MB230 chassis

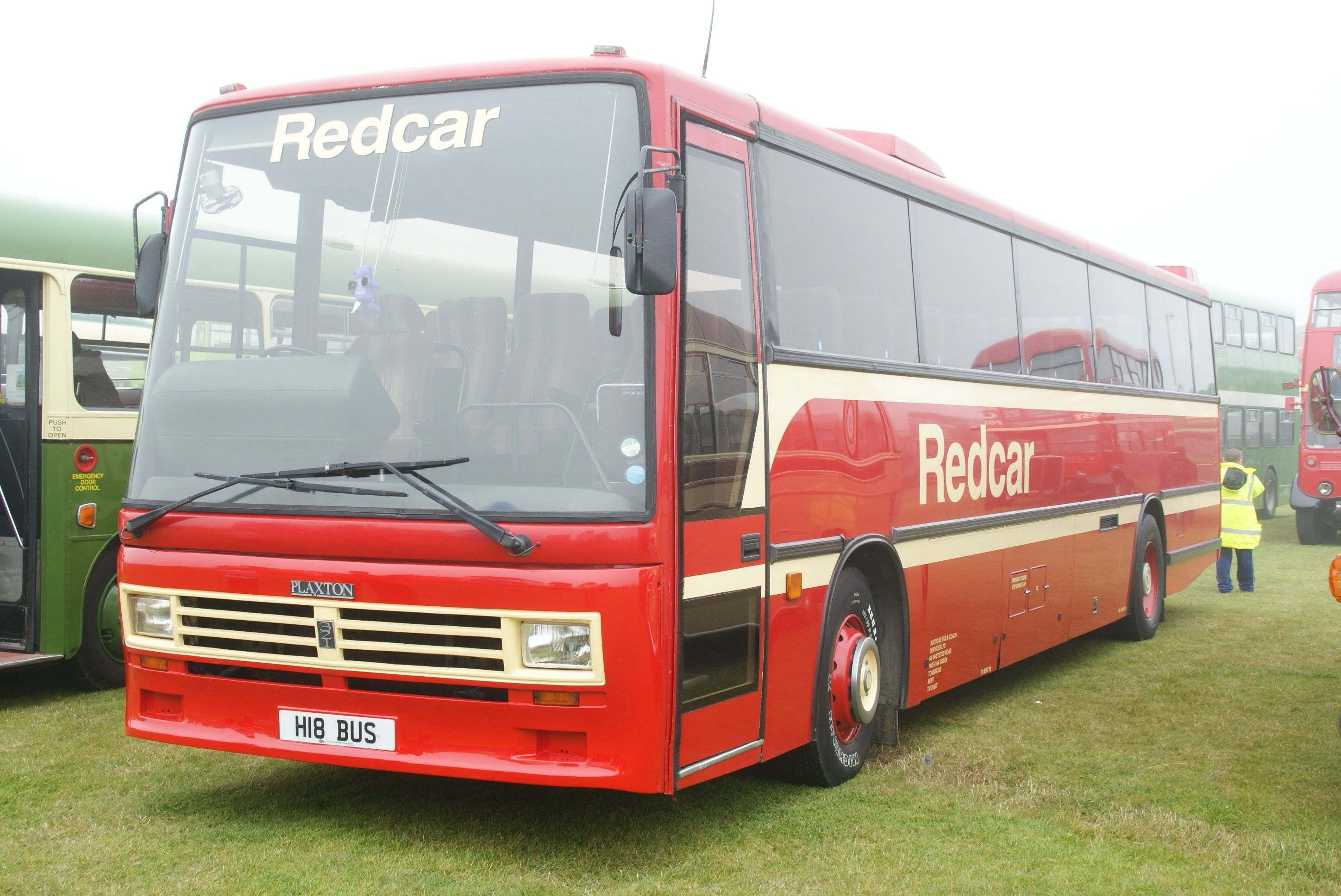
Plaxton 321 on Leyland Tiger chassis

== See also ==
- Plaxton Derwent 3000
- Plaxton Paramount
- List of buses
