= Duple 425 =

Coach design built by Hestair Duple in the late 1980s

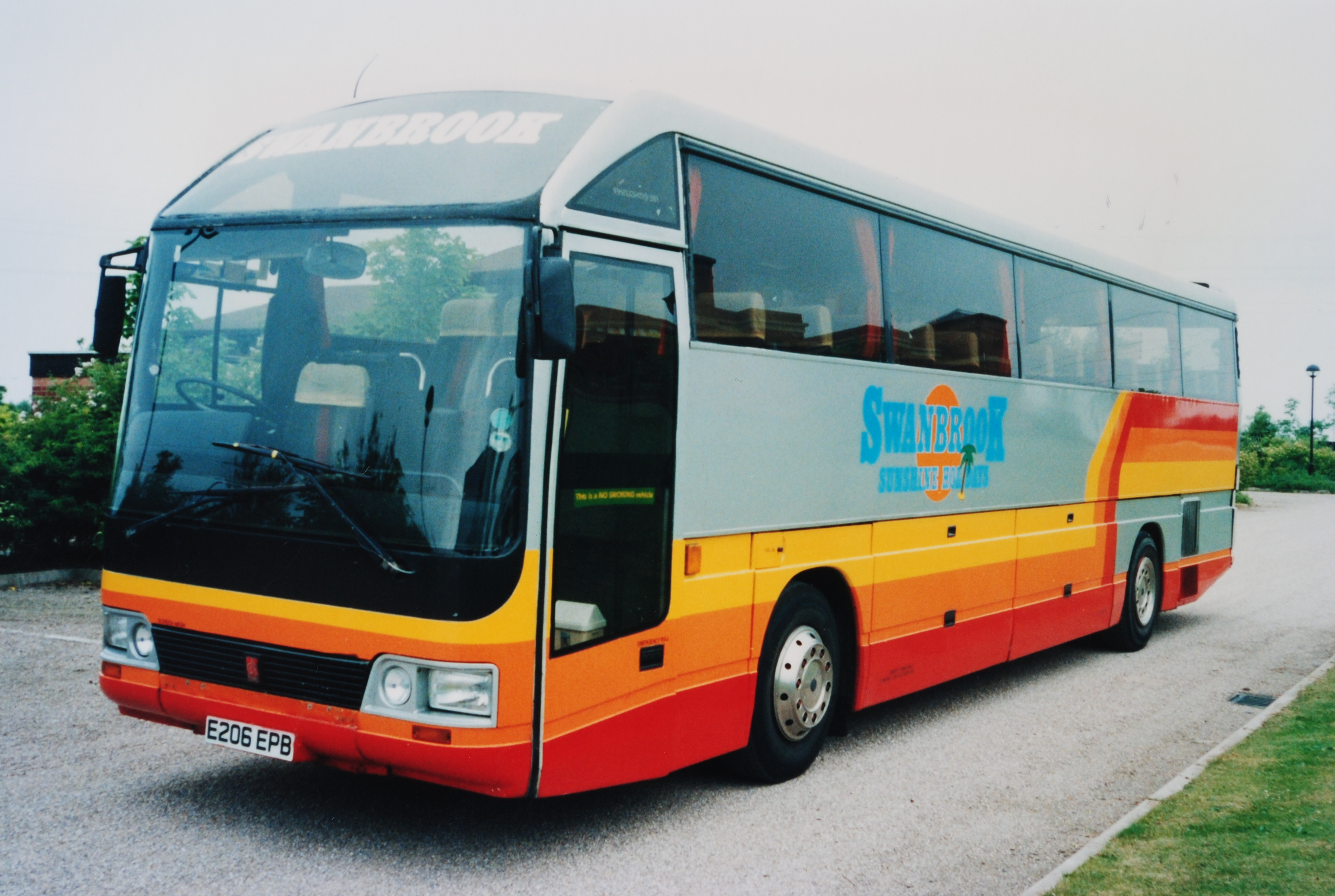
Duple 425

The Duple 425 was a coach design built by Hestair Duple in the late 1980s, and briefly by Plaxton in the early 1990s.

It was a fully integral coach, unlike most contemporary British designs which had a separate body and chassis, and was notable for its streamlined design with a sloping upper windscreen and a drag coefficient of Cd=0.425, hence the model designation.

== History ==
In the early 1980s the British coach market underwent considerable change, putting pressure on the established British coachbuilding firms which had previously dominated the market. In the 1970s the great majority of coaches sold in the UK had comprised a British-built chassis with separately assembled bodywork by one of the two dominant domestic coachbuilders, Duple and Plaxton. The highest sales volumes were achieved by lightweight chassis such as the Bedford Y series and Ford R series, and even imported chassis such as the Volvo B58 usually carried Duple or Plaxton coachwork. However, the 1980s saw a move away from lightweights towards heavier and more sophisticated designs, increasingly supplied by foreign chassis and bodywork manufacturers. Some of the foreign coaches now selling in Britain were of integral construction, and Duple wished to produce an integral design of its own to compete more effectively with these. The first attempts were a pair of prototypes built in 1983, one of which was a semi-integral variant of the Duple Caribbean body built on German Auwärter Neoplan N716 running gear, which remained a one-off. The other prototype employed Dutch BOVA Europa running gear within a unique style of semi-integral body known as the Duple Calypso, and a further 50 production vehicles of this type were built for the 1984 season.

However, in June 1983 Duple had been sold to the Hestair Group, which had previously acquired the British chassis manufacturer Dennis Brothers of Guildford. Duple was renamed Hestair Duple, and rather than persisting with semi-integrals built on third party running gear it was decided to develop a fully integral coach with running units from sister company Hestair Dennis. As a result the Duple 425 was developed, and production commenced in 1985. The 425 had a rear-mounted Cummins or DAF engine with automatic transmission, and a typical layout seated 57 passengers (or 53 with a toilet fitted), which was a relatively high capacity for a 12 metre coach at the time.

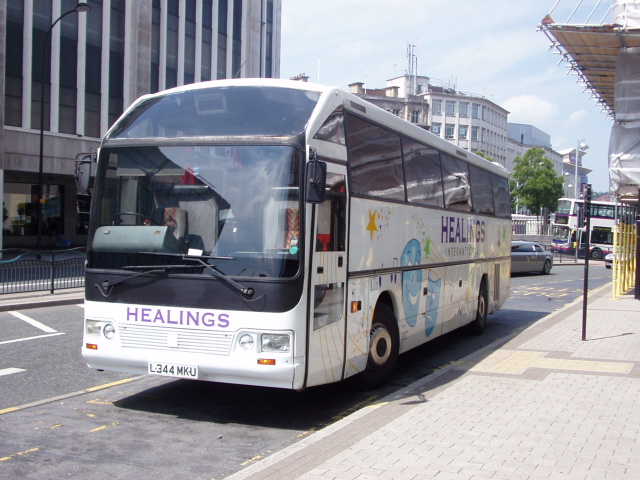
Plaxton 425

Sales of the 425 were limited with only about 130 vehicles being completed, although many of them enjoyed unusually long service lives. Most of Duple's output continued to be conventional bodies on third-party chassis, but overall sales volumes continued to decline leading to financial pressures. In November 1988, the coachbuilding business was sold and renamed Duple International. In July 1989 the Blackpool factory was closed down, and the manufacturing rights and jigs for Duple coach products sold to its main domestic competitor, Plaxton, for £4 million.

The 425 design was modified by Plaxton and re-entered production in 1991 as the Plaxton 425, which was assembled by Plaxton's French subsidiary Carrosserie Lorraine. However the Lorraine factory closed in 1992 after only 12 further 425 models had been built.
