= Duple Caribbean =

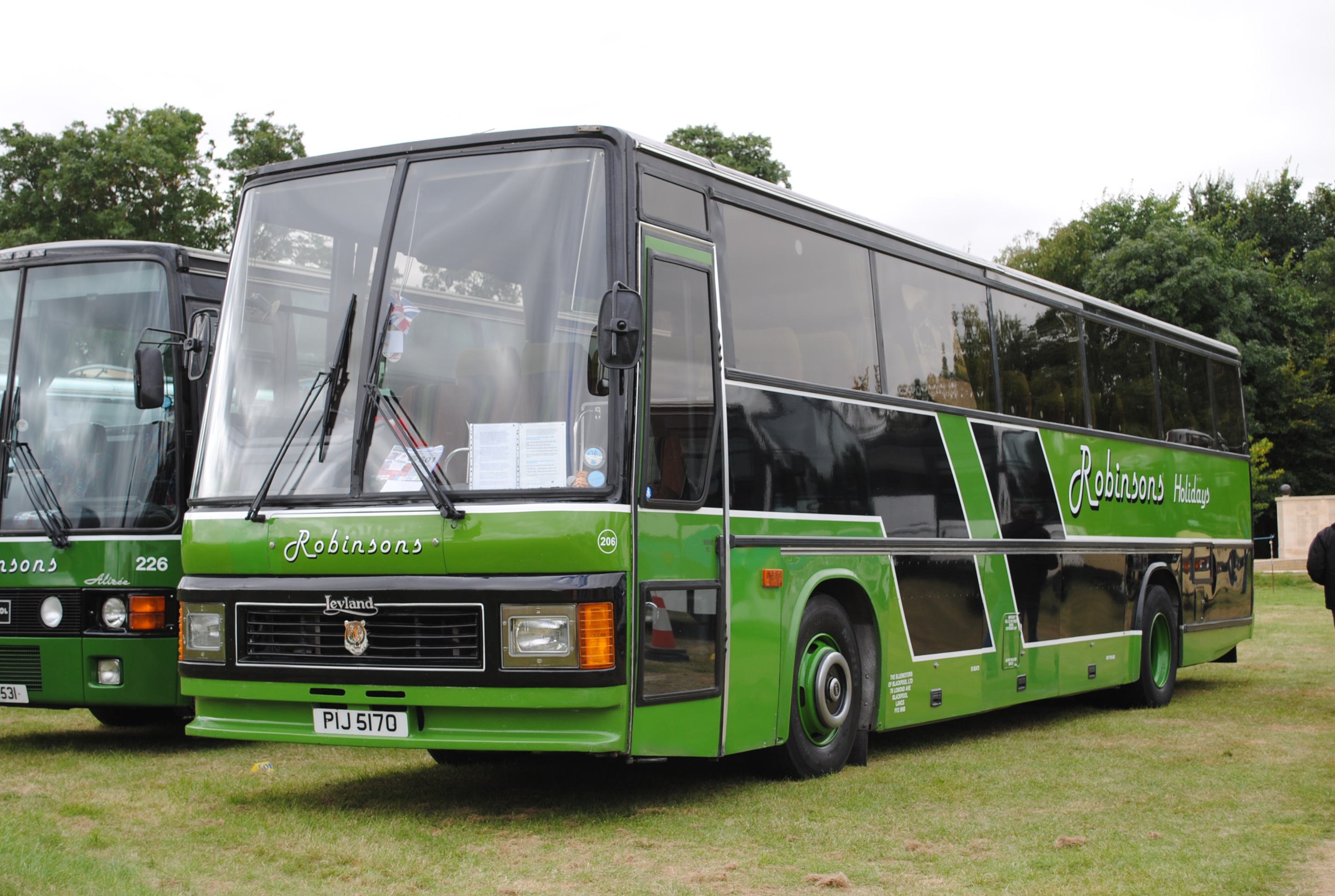
- Duple Caribbean II body on Leyland Tiger chassis

Overview
- Manufacturer: Duple
- Production: 1983–1986

Body and chassis
- Doors: 1
- Floor type: Step entrance
- Chassis: Auwärter Neoplan N716; DAF MB200; Dennis Dorchester; Leyland Tiger; Volvo B10M
- Related: Duple Calypso; Duple Laser

Dimensions
- Length: 12 metres (39 ft)

Chronology
- Predecessor: Duple Goldliner
- Successor: Duple 340

The Duple Caribbean was design of a coach bodywork built by Duple between 1983 and 1986. It replaced the high-floor Goldliner variant of the long-running Duple Dominant range as Duple's premium coach body of the mid 1980s.

== Variants ==
The original Caribbean was introduced in 1983 as Duple's upmarket / high-floor coach and was available on 12 metre long mid-engined DAF, Dennis, Leyland and Volvo chassis. At the time Duple was attempting to develop its own integral coach designs and a one-off rear-engined semi-integral Caribbean was built on Neoplan running gear as a prototype. The design bonded glazing which distinguished it from the contemporary low-floor Duple Laser (early examples of which had gasket glazing). Quad headlights and a narrow chrome grille were standard, although twin headlights and a wider grille (as used on the Duple Calypso) could be specified as an option. The bonded-glazed Calypso was similar in appearance to the Caribbean, but was closer in height to the Laser.

At the end of 1984 the Caribbean range was given a facelift and renamed the Caribbean II. The main difference was a revised front with twin headlamps and plastic grille, shared with the contemporary Laser 2 (which gained bonded glazing at this time, becoming closer in appearance to the Caribbean II).

== Replacement ==
At the end of 1985 the new Duple 320 and 340 were launched as replacements for the Laser and Caribbean ranges respectively. The remaining stock of Caribbean coaches entered service during 1986.

== Gallery ==
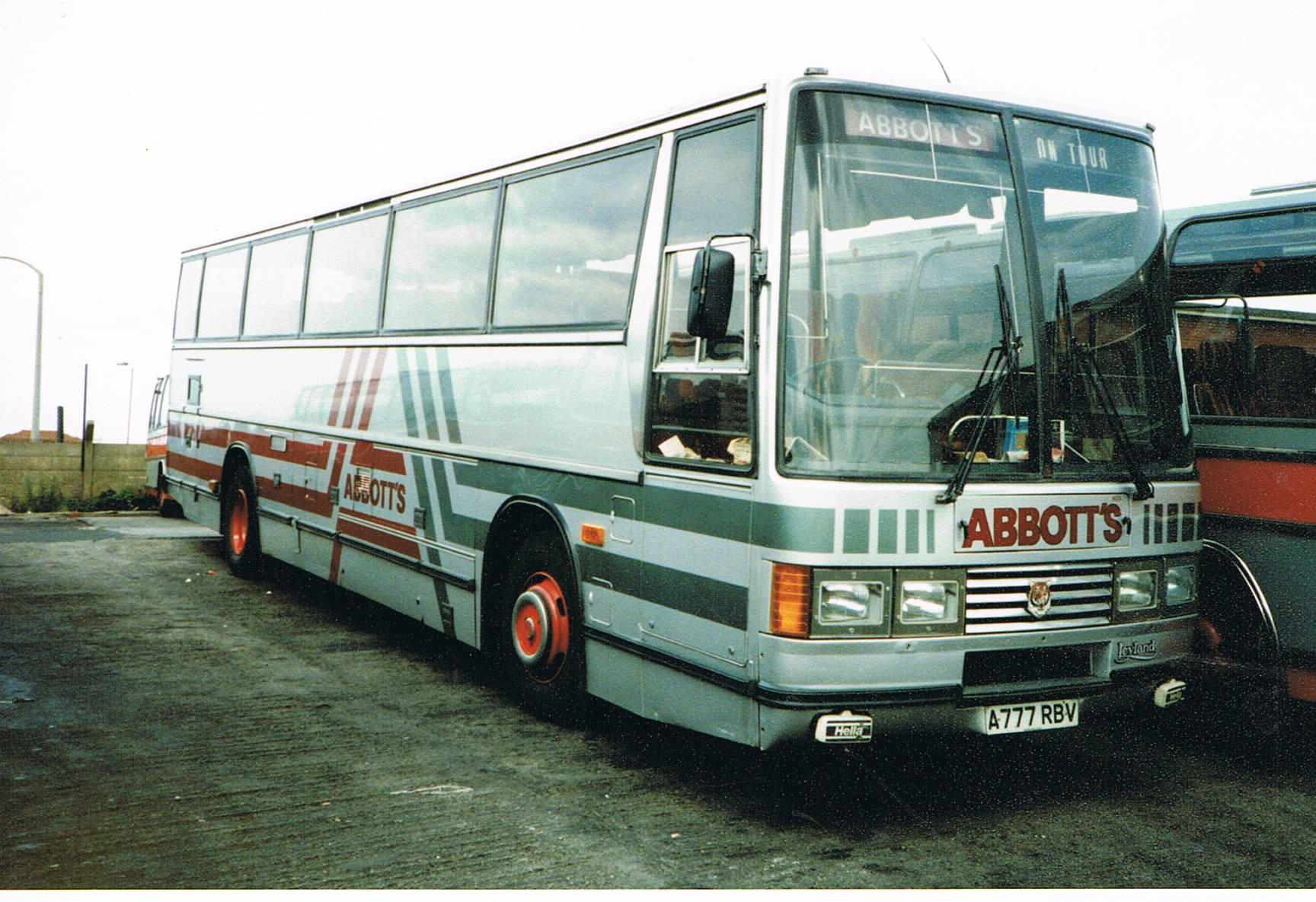
Duple Caribbean on Leyland Tiger chassis

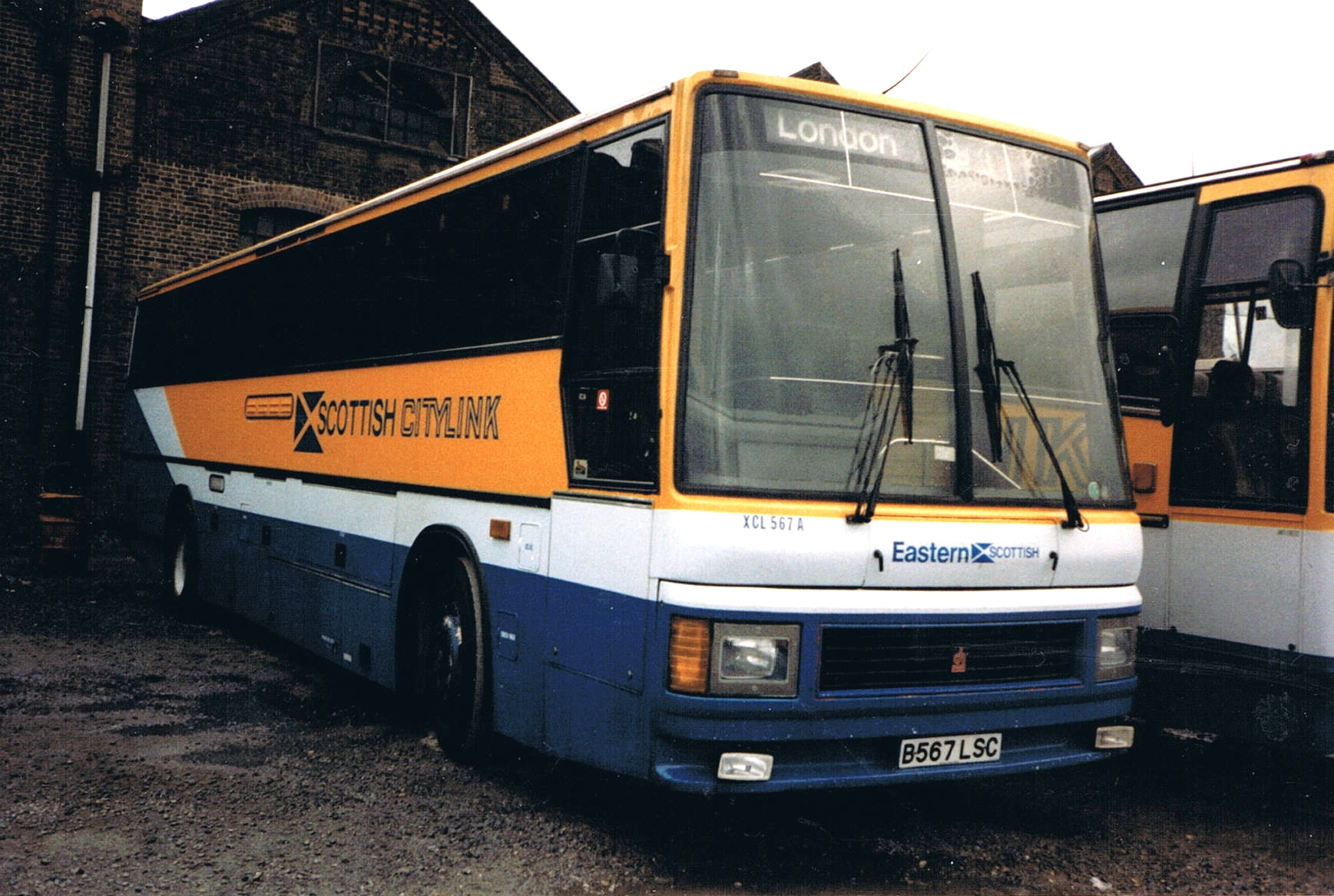
Duple Caribbean II on Leyland Tiger chassis

== See also ==
- Plaxton Paramount
- List of buses
