= Duple Dominant =

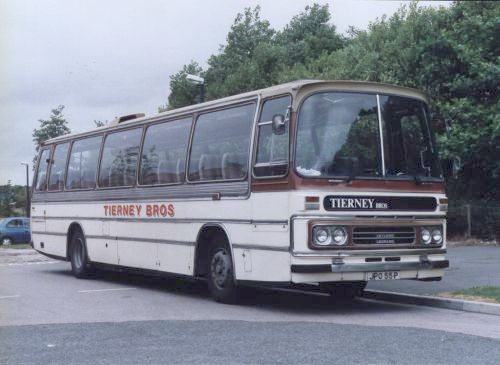
- Duple Dominant bodied Leyland Leopard

Overview
- Manufacturer: Duple
- Production: 1972–1982

Body and chassis
- Doors: 1 door
- Floor type: Step entrance
- Chassis: Albion Viking EVK55CL; AEC Reliance; Bedford YRQ, YRT, YMT; Bristol LH; DAF MB200; Ford R1014, R1114; Leyland Leopard; Leyland Tiger; Volvo B58; Volvo B10M

The Duple Dominant was a design of a coach (and less commonly bus) bodywork built by Duple between 1972 and 1987. It introduced an all-steel structure and replaced the wooden-framed Duple Vega, Viceroy and Vista models.

== Chassis ==
Duple Dominant bodywork was built on different chassis types including:

front engined

- Albion Viking EVK55CL (export only)
- Bedford SB
- Bedford VAS
- Ford R192, R226, R1014, R1114
- Leyland Cub (Dominant Bus only)
- Mercedes-Benz LPO608
- Seddon Pennine 6

mid engined

- AEC Reliance
- Bedford YMQ, YRQ, YRT, YMT, YNT
- Bristol LH
- DAF MB200
- Dennis Lancet (Dominant Bus only)
- Leyland Leopard
- Leyland Tiger
- Volvo B58
- Volvo B10M

rear engined

- Dennis Falcon H (Dominant Bus only)
- Dennis Falcon V (Goldliner only)

== Variants ==
The original Dominant had a windscreen (and matching rear windows) of the same height as the side windows. After 1976 it received a new design of grille and was known as the Dominant I. It remained in production throughout the Dominant's production life as a cheaper alternative to the Dominant II and because the deeper windscreens of the later Dominant marks were incompatible with some front-engined chassis. Some Dominant I bodies had Dominant II style rear windows, and/or headlights and front grilles. Special narrow bodies built for use on the Channel Islands retained the pre-1976 style grille until the end of production.

The Dominant II (introduced in 1976) had a deeper windscreen, rectangular headlights, a different grille and a smaller, flat, single piece rear window.

The Dominant III was designed to satisfy a Scottish Bus Group (SBG) requirement for express coaches, and featured shallow, parallelogram-shaped flat double-glazed side windows similar to those on SBG's previous Alexander M-type coaches. Most Dominant IIIs featured a small Dominant I style windscreen mounted in the lower Dominant II position so as to allow a destination display to be included without breaking the roof line, but others had full-height Dominant II type windscreens. The small high-level windows were designed for SBG's overnight Scotland to London services where quietness was more important than passenger views, but nevertheless some other operators did buy the Dominant III as a touring coach. After being retired from long-distance services many SBG Dominant IIIs were rebuilt with larger Dominant I/II or Dominant IV windows to make them more suitable for general coaching work, and many were given replacement bodies later in life.

The Dominant IV had slightly shallower side windows than those on the Dominant I and II, and these were available with flat glass as an option. Examples were built with all three varieties of windscreen size/position (Dominant I, Dominant II or hybrid Dominant III style). A few Dominant II/IV hybrids were built with stepped window lines, with larger Dominant I/II windows towards the front and shallower Dominant IV windows towards the rear.

Introduction of the Dominant III/IV also heralded the introduction of a new bespoke rear light cluster fitted at a lower level and integrated into the body shape. This was also used on many Goldliners. A lot of these were replaced with other units in later life, probably because they were prone to damage or because spares became difficult to obtain.

Many Dominant bodies were built to a dual-purpose specification featuring bus-type doors and other modifications to make them suitable for OMO (one-man operation) stage carriage services, and thus eligible for the British government's bus grant which subsidised the cost of new service buses. These were known as the Dominant Express with the appropriate mark number where applicable (e.g. Dominant II Express). Some such bodies were actually furnished as service buses with low-backed bus seats, in which form the model was known as the Dominant E (again with mark number where applicable).

The Dominant E was therefore a coach body fitted out as a bus and is not to be confused with the visually dissimilar Dominant Bus which was a purpose-designed bus body built in relatively small numbers from 1974 to 1987. This employed a similar structure to the coach bodies but with flat sides and small windows positioned lower on the body, amongst other differences.

The Goldliner name was first used in 1975/76 for two non-standard one-off bodies based on the Dominant. The first was a high floor body on an early Bedford YMT built as a demonstrator, while the second was an export body with flat, double-glazed windows on a Volvo B58 chassis for Sweden. The name appeared again in 1982 for the Goldliner II, III and IV, which were high-floor versions of the Dominant II, III or IV. All had Dominant II style windscreens, and some coaches not fitted with destination or operator name displays above the windscreen had a stepped roofline behind the cab. As with the Dominant III, many Goldliner IIIs were subsequently rebuilt with larger single-glazed windows or rebodied.

== Replacement ==
In 1983 the new Duple Laser and high-floor Caribbean were launched as replacements for the full-sized Dominant coach variants and the Goldliner respectively. The last handful of full-sized Dominant coaches were built for the 1984 season. Due to the small volume of sales it was not worth engineering the Laser for the smaller front-engined Bedford SB and VAS chassis, so Dominant coaches on these chassis continued to be built until 1985. The Dominant Bus remained in production until 1987 when it was replaced by the Duple 300.

== Gallery ==
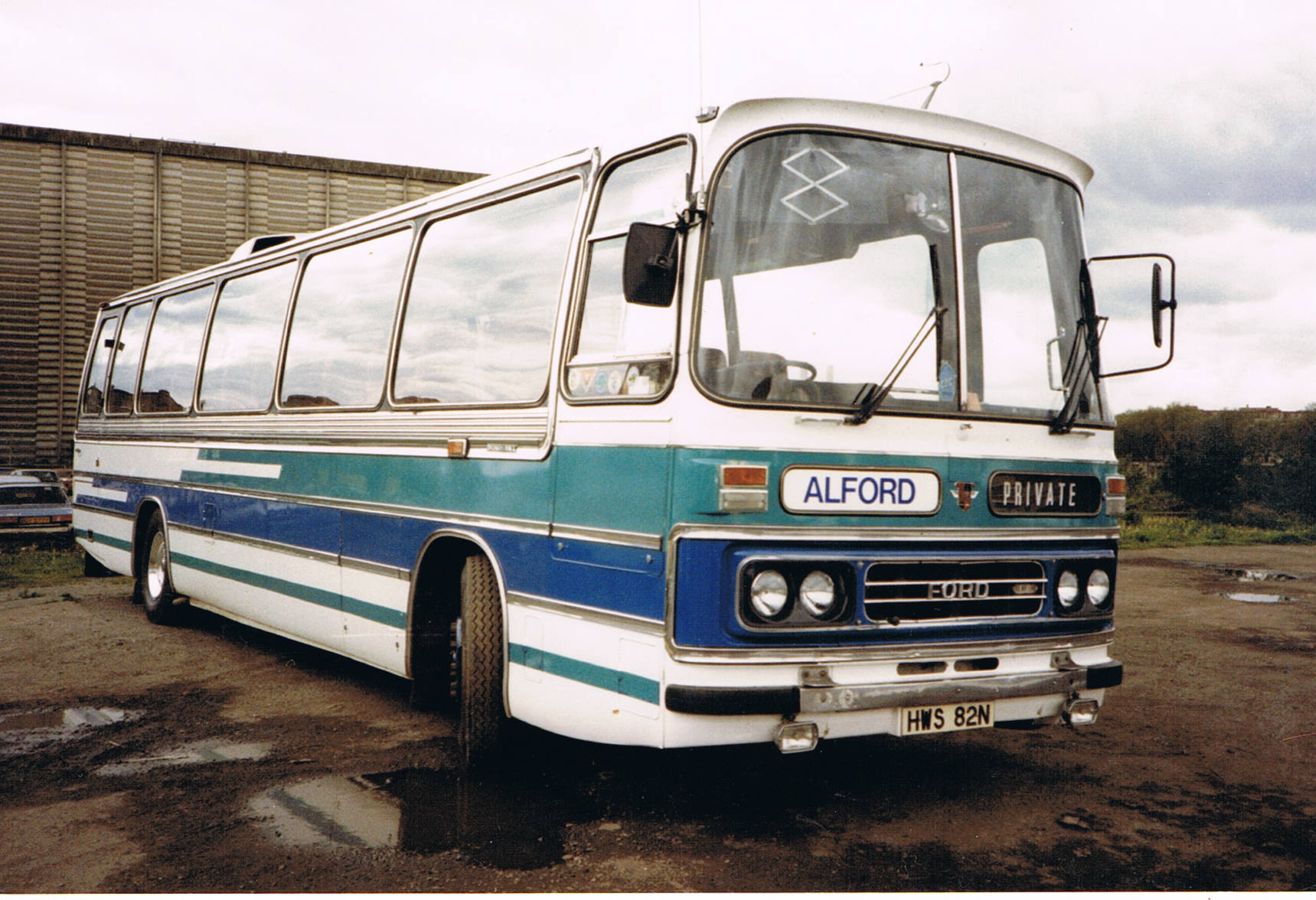
Duple Dominant bodied Ford R1114

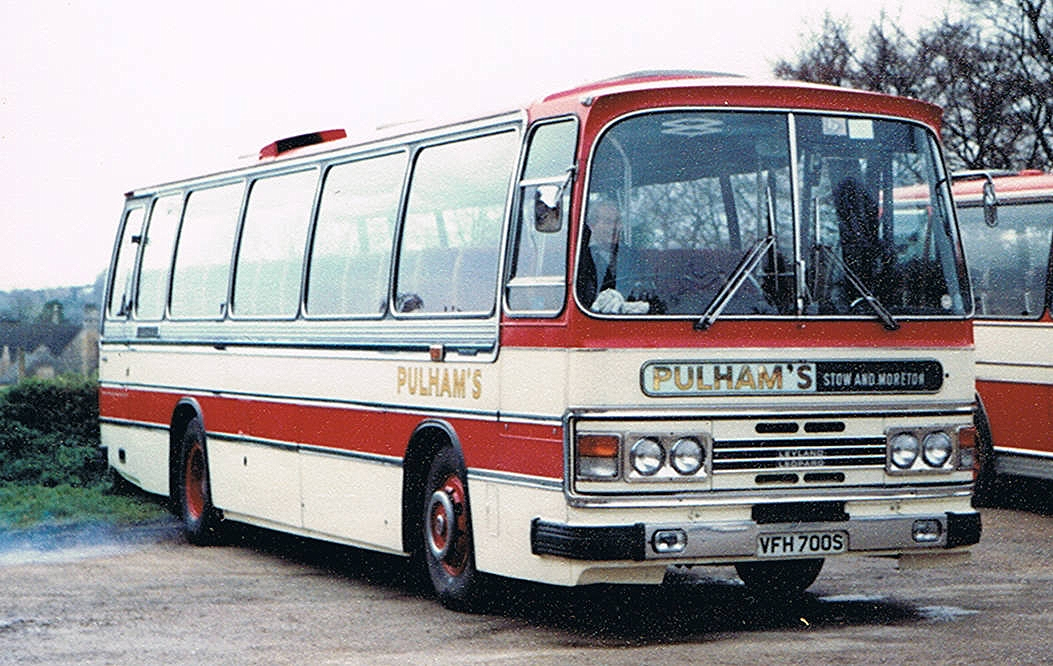
Duple Dominant I bodied Leyland Leopard. The Dominant I was a facelifted version of the original Dominant with revised front lights and front grille.

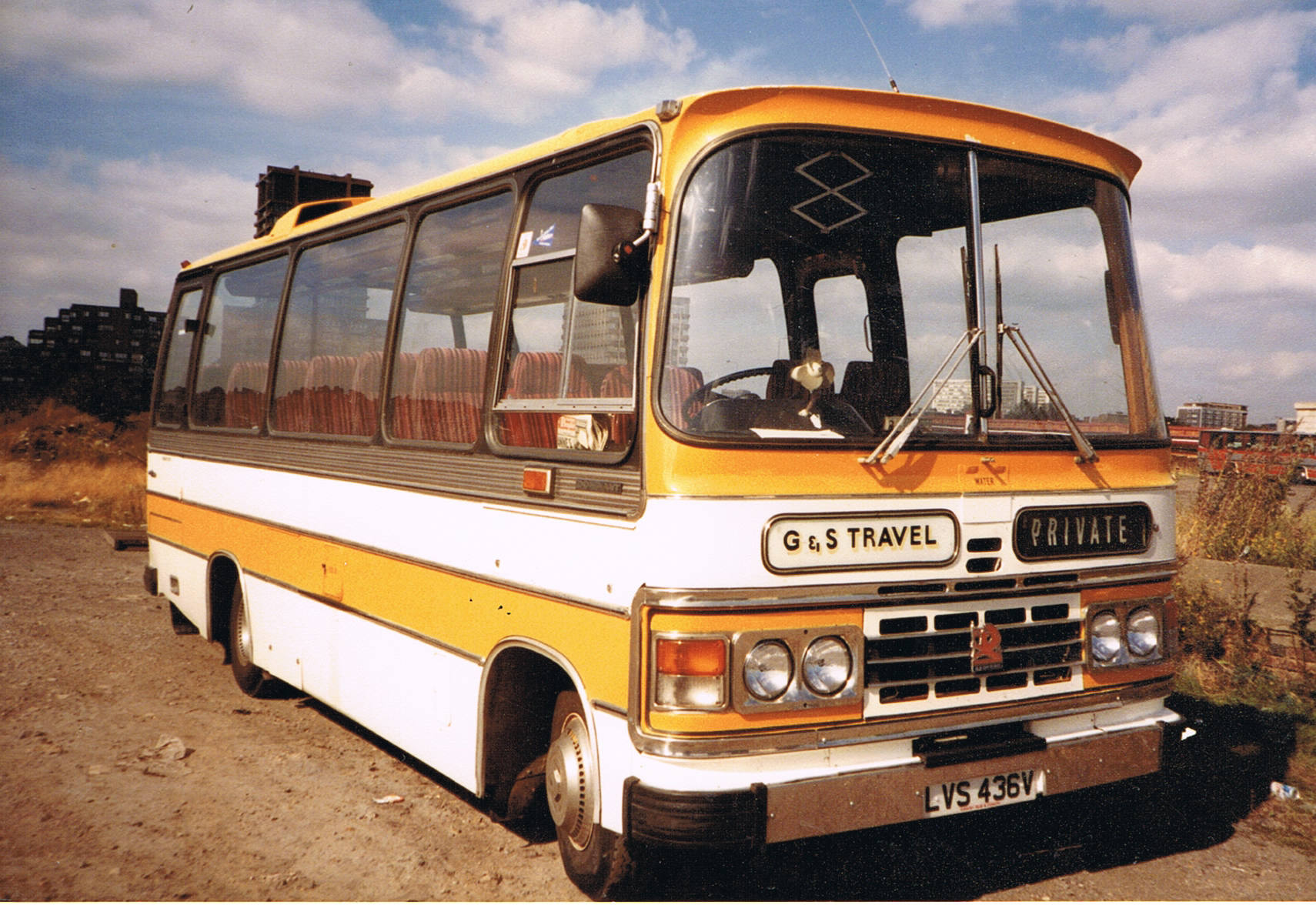
Duple Dominant I bodied Bedford VAS.

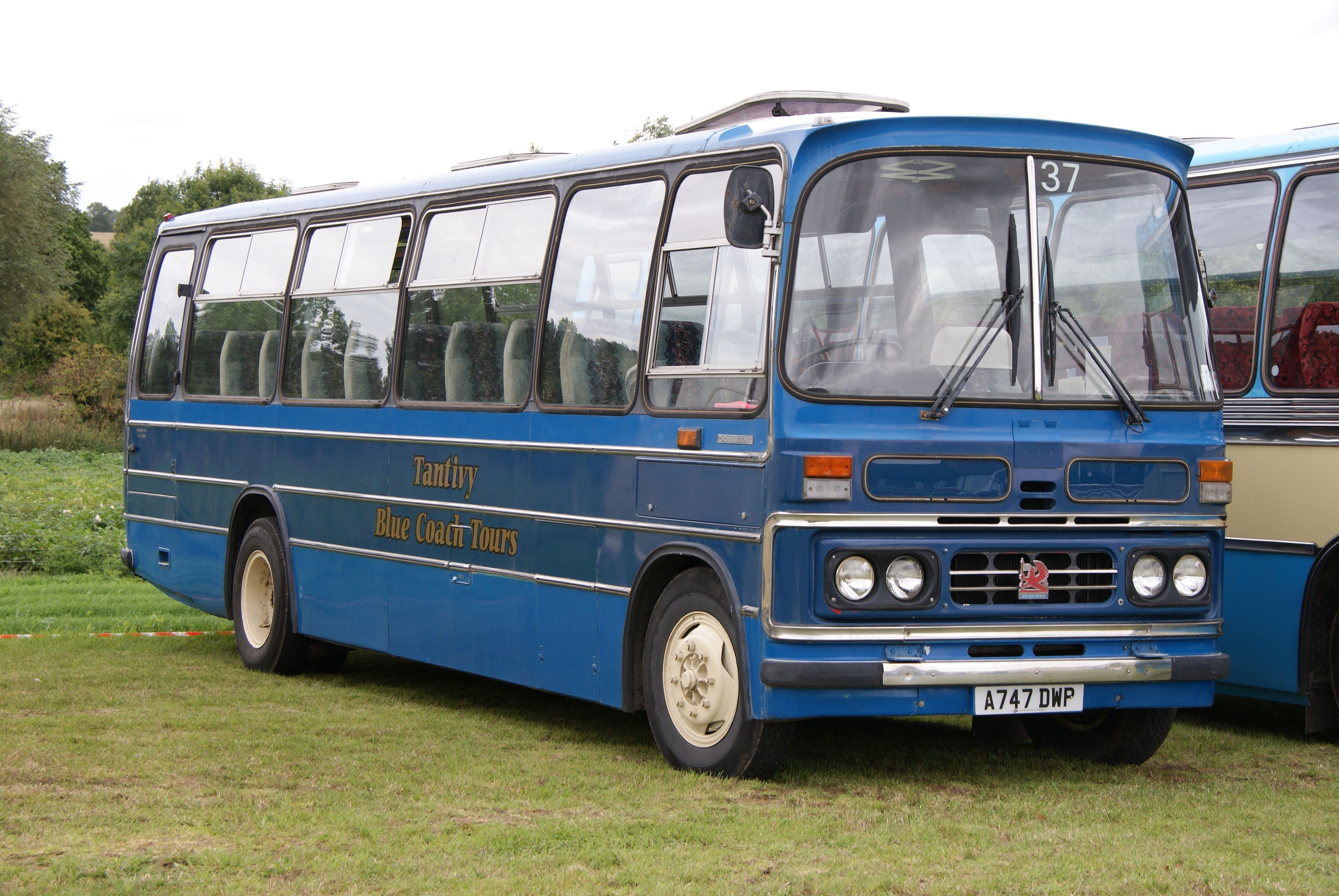
Duple Dominant I bodied Bedford SB. This is a narrow (7' 6" rather than the standard 8") body, which retained the original style of front panel.

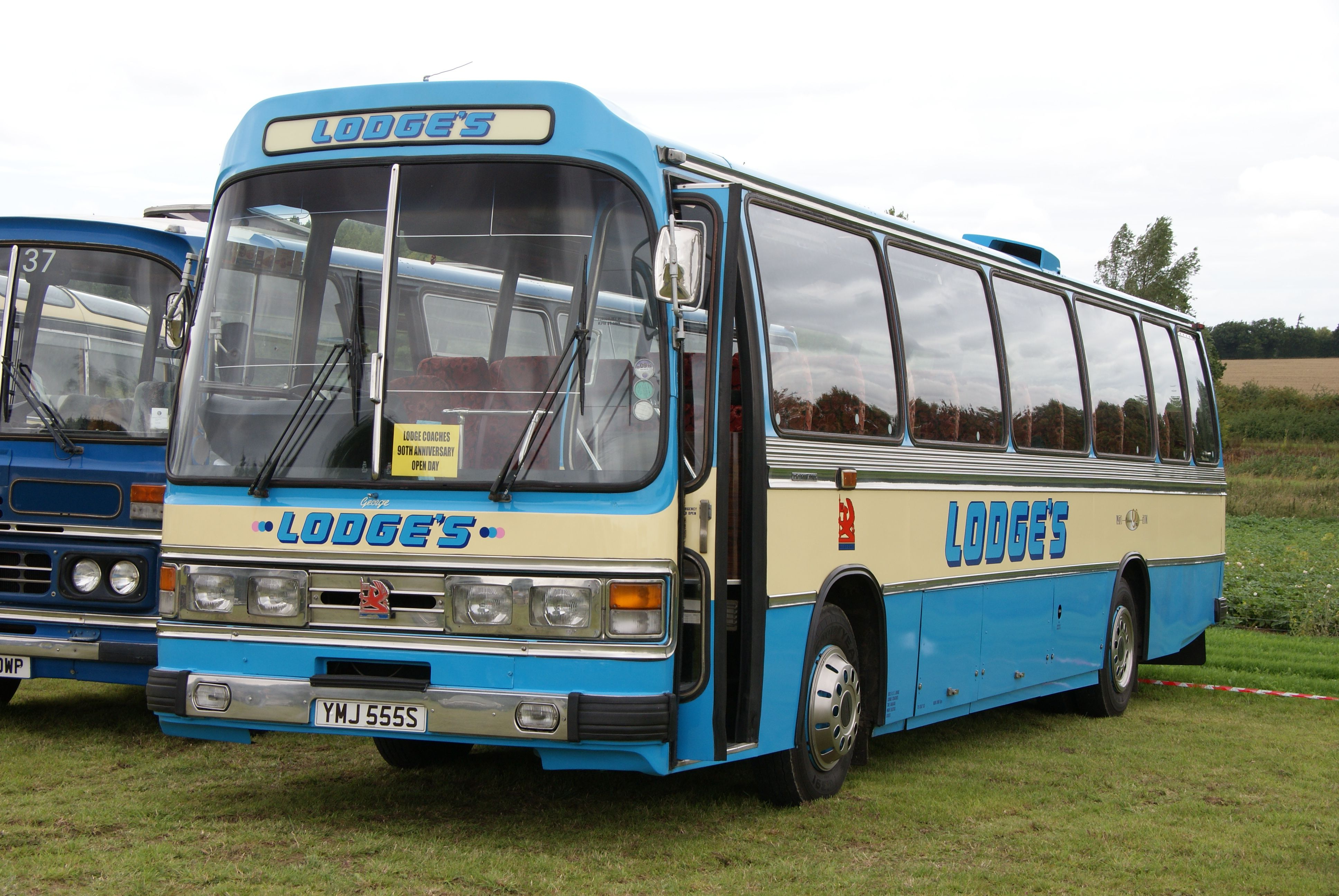
Duple Dominant II bodied Bedford YMT. This coach has the early style of Dominant II grille and a raised "Bristol dome" destination/operator name display above the windscreen.

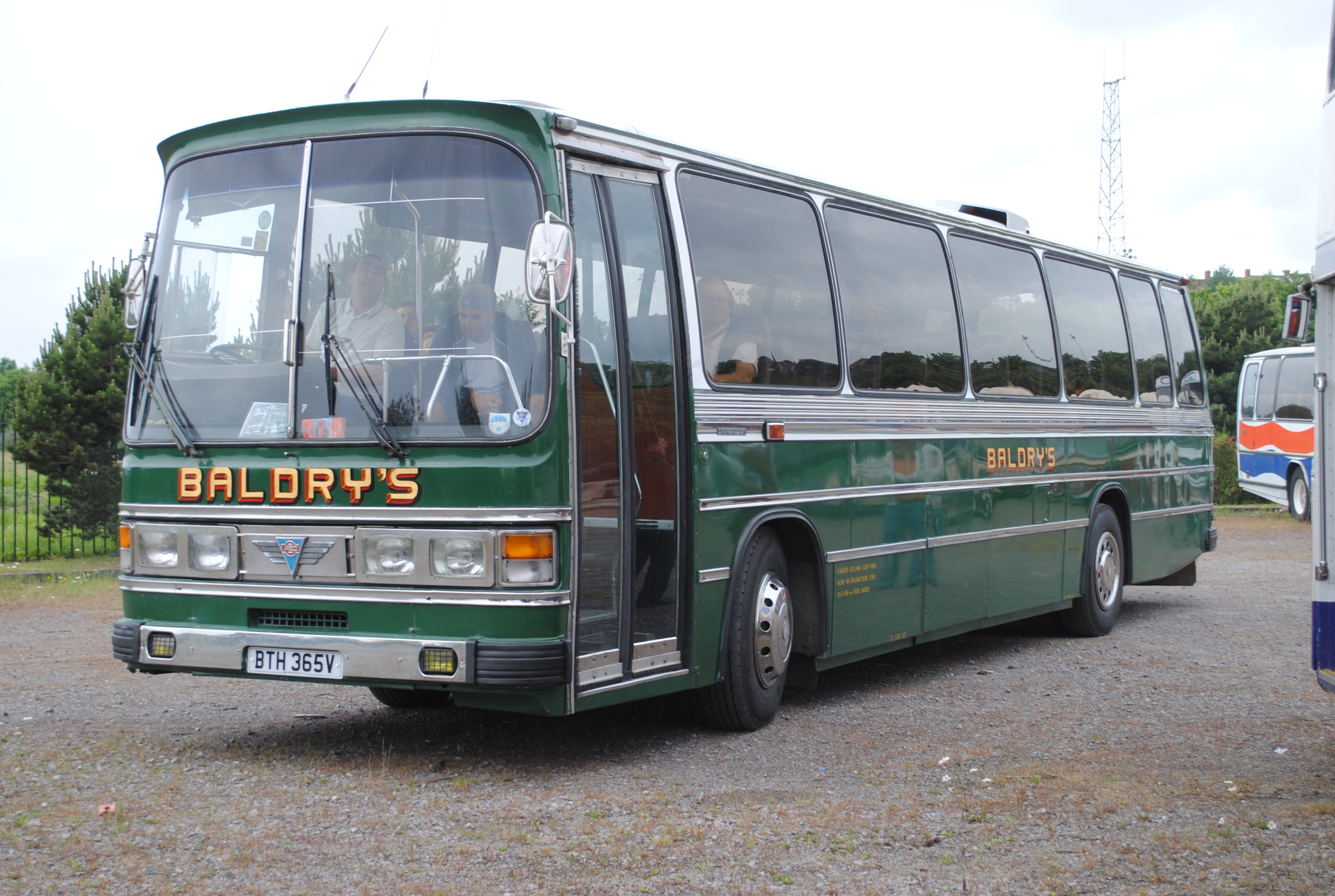
Duple Dominant II Express on AEC Reliance chassis, showing the wider doorway and bus style two-piece door fitted to Express versions.

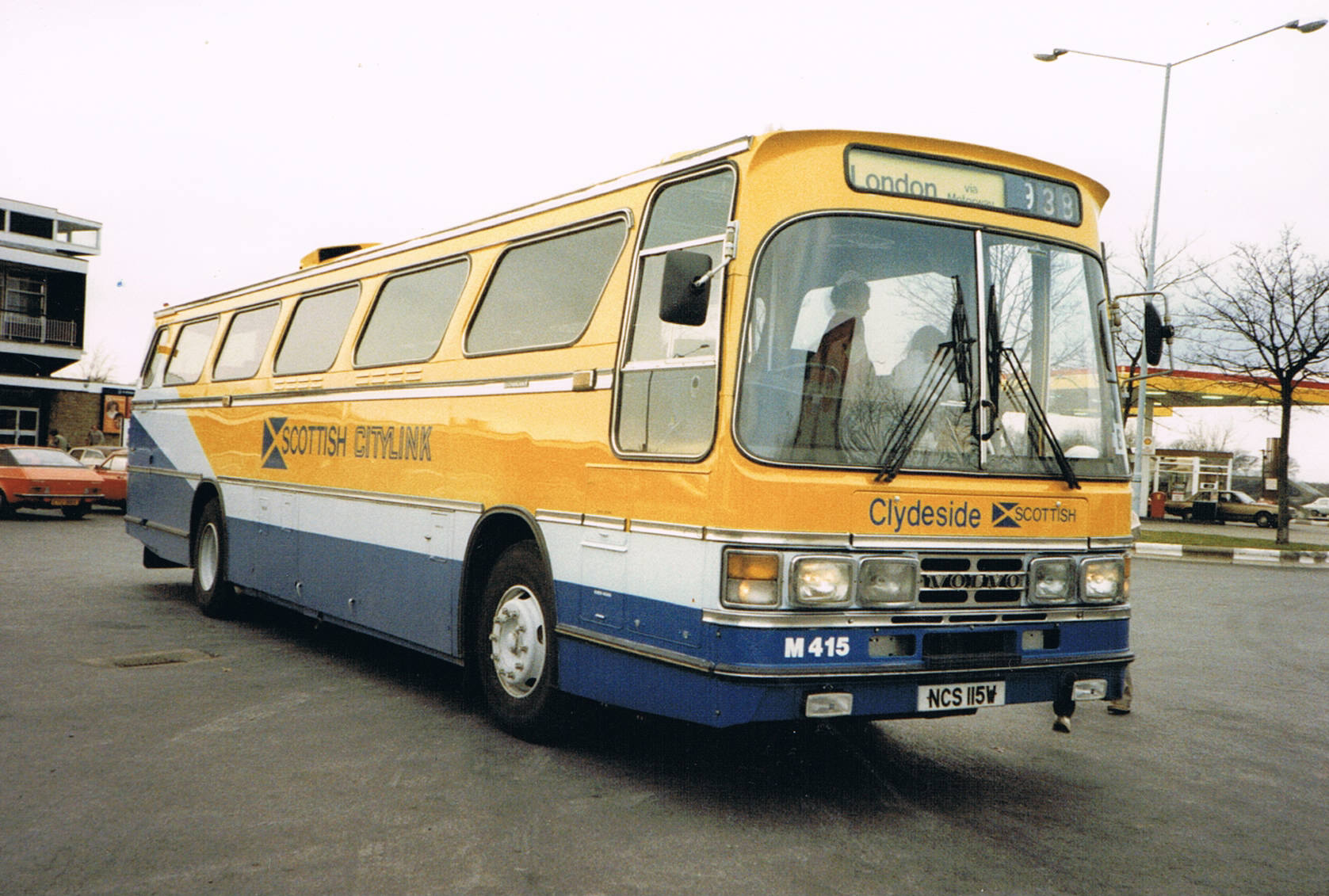
Duple Dominant III bodied Volvo B10M. This vehicle has a smaller Dominant I windscreen mounted at Dominant II level to allow a destination display to be fitted without breaking the roofline, and also has optional individually mounted headlights.

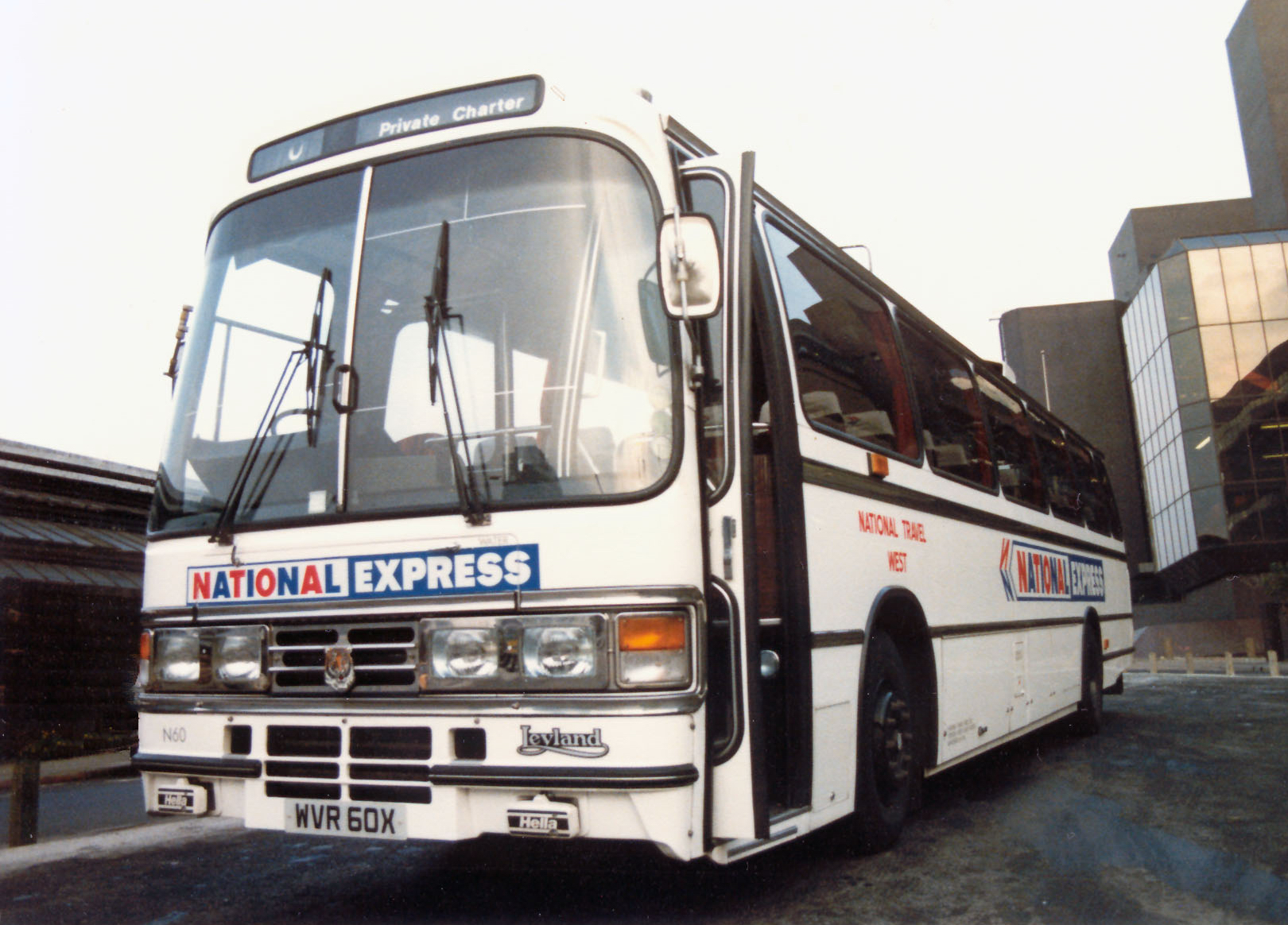
Duple Dominant IV bodied Leyland Tiger, showing the slightly revised style of grille used from 1981 onwards.

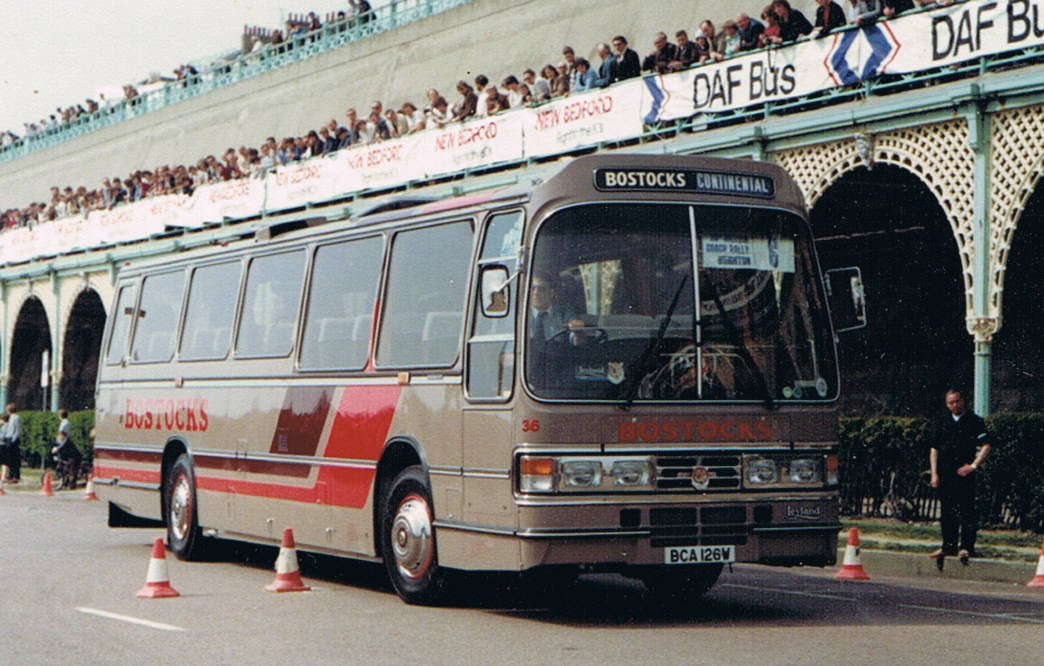
Duple Dominant II/IV hybrid on Leyland Tiger chassis. This vehicle has optional flat-glass passenger windows.

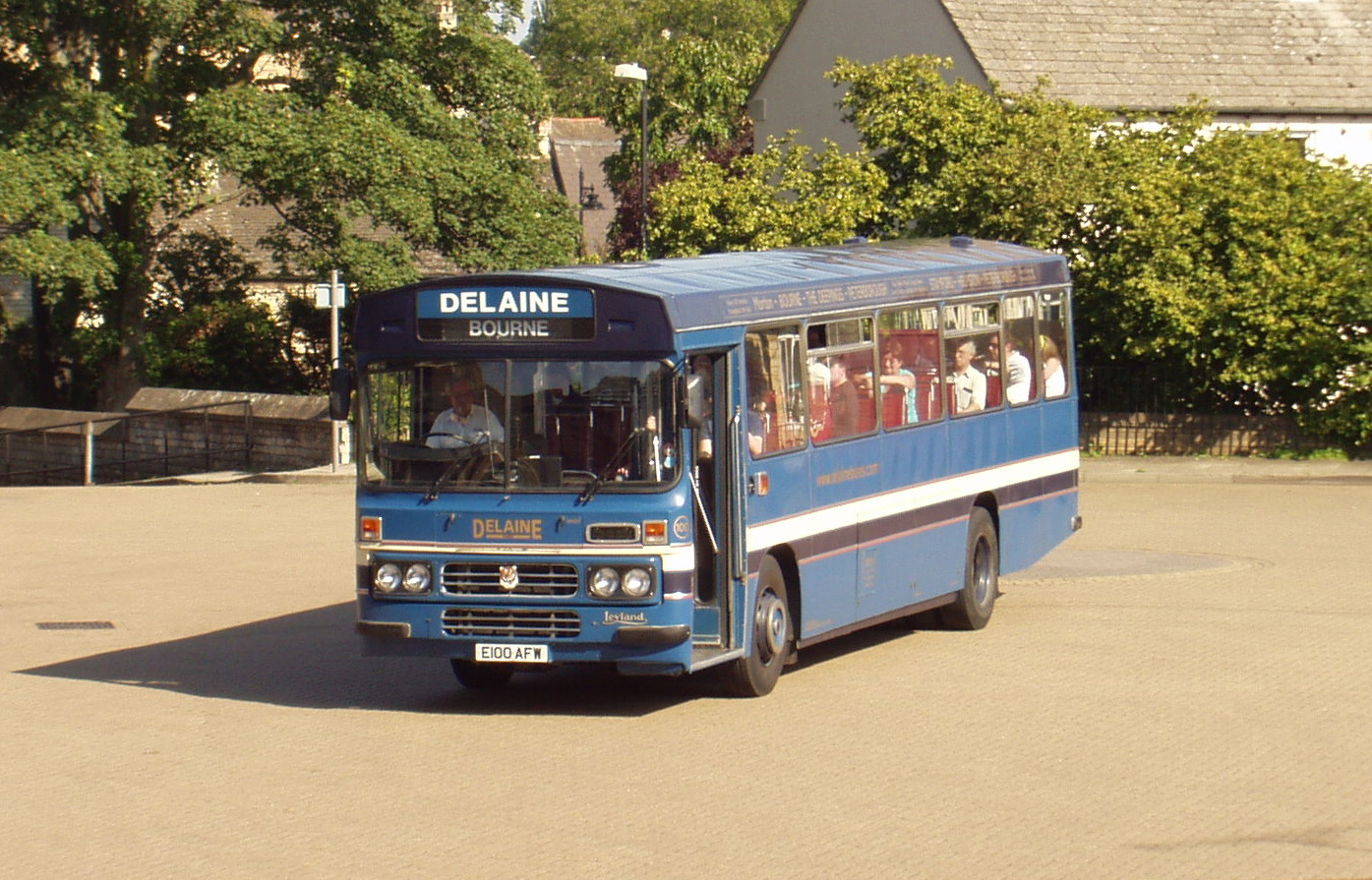
Duple Dominant Bus bodied Leyland Tiger

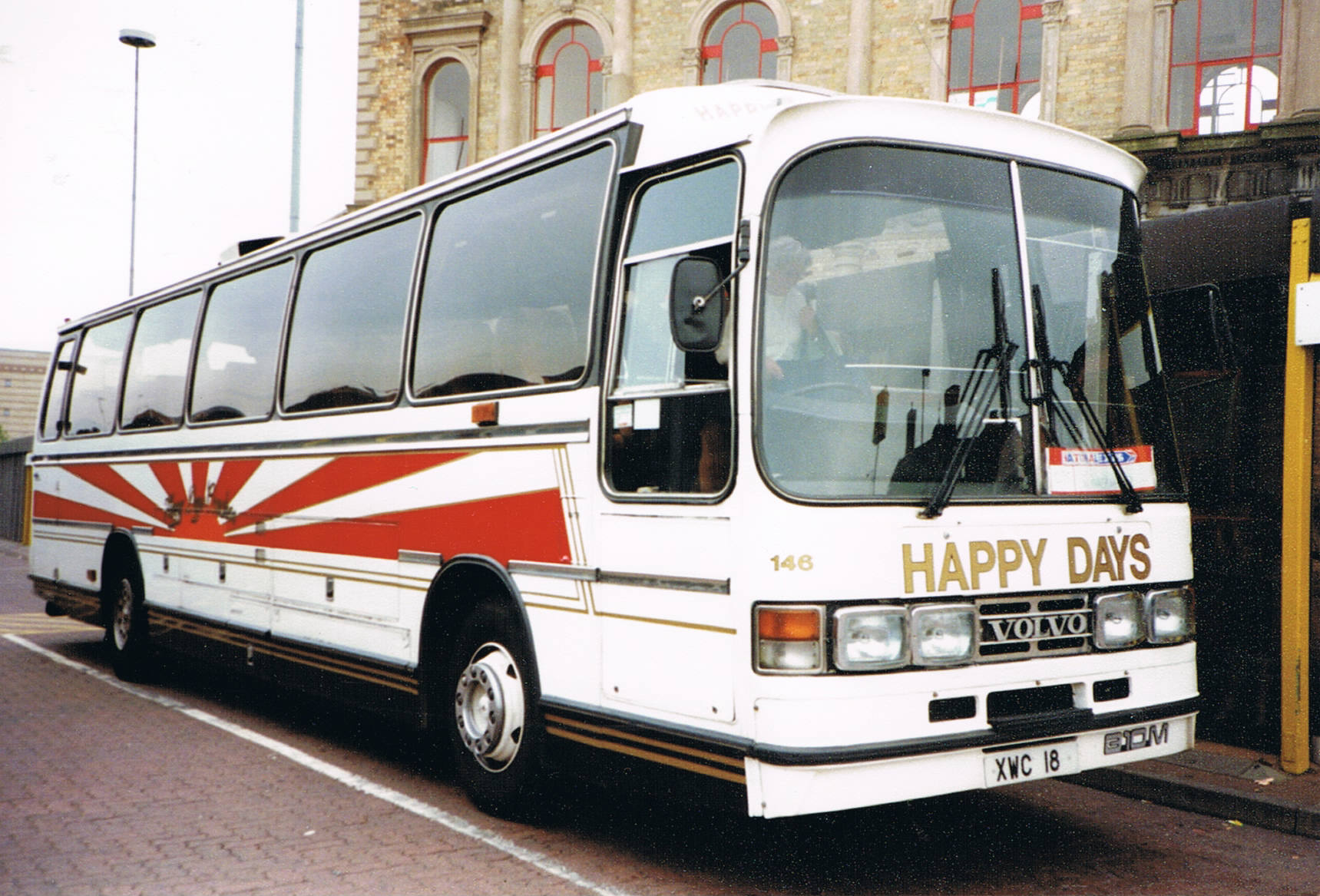
Duple Goldliner II on Volvo B10M chassis. This is a stepped-roofline version.

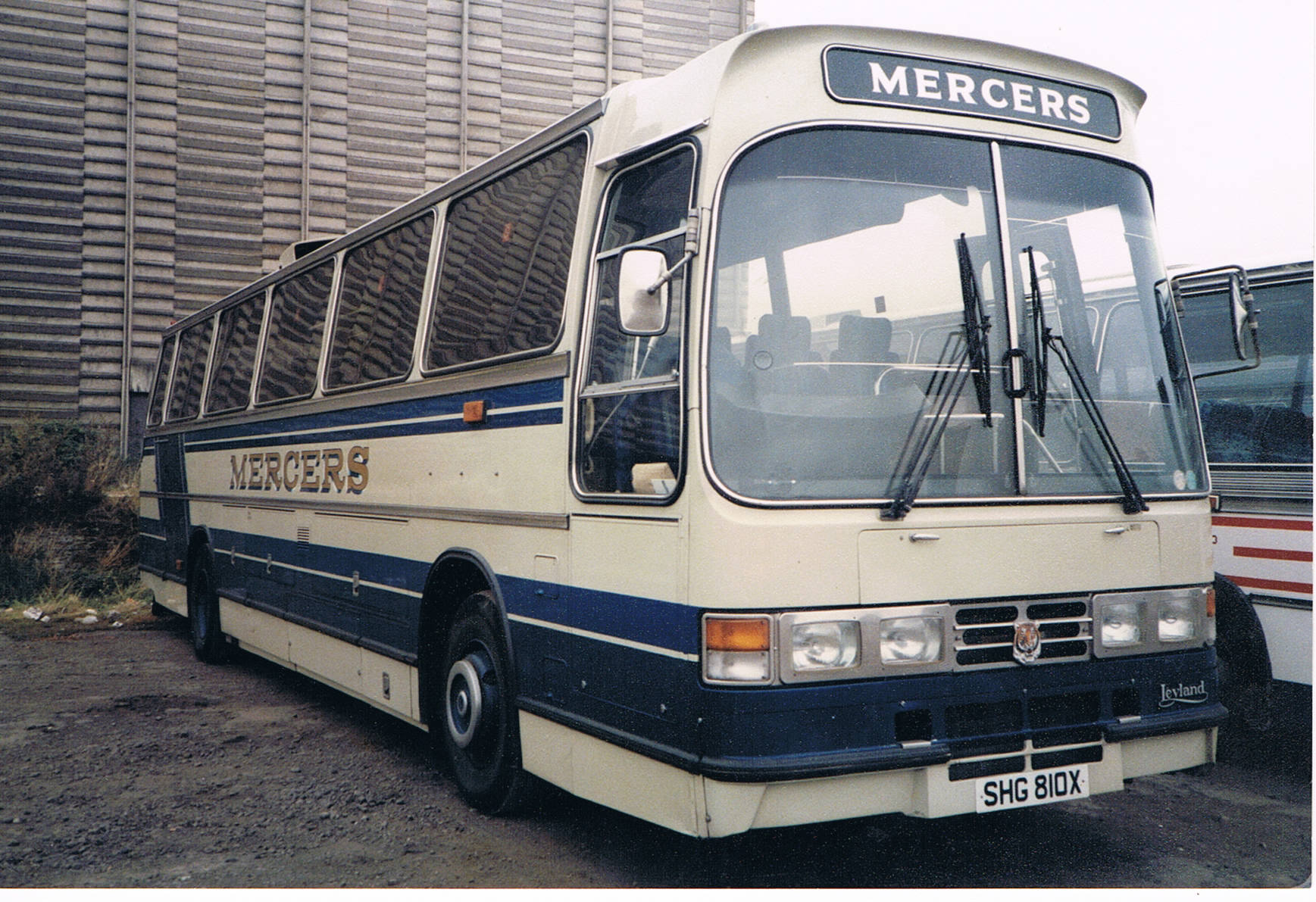
Duple Goldliner IV on Leyland Tiger chassis, with the alternative roof profile incorporating a destination/name display over the windscreen and optional flat glazing.

== See also ==
- Plaxton Panorama Elite
- Plaxton Supreme
- List of buses
