= Ford R series =

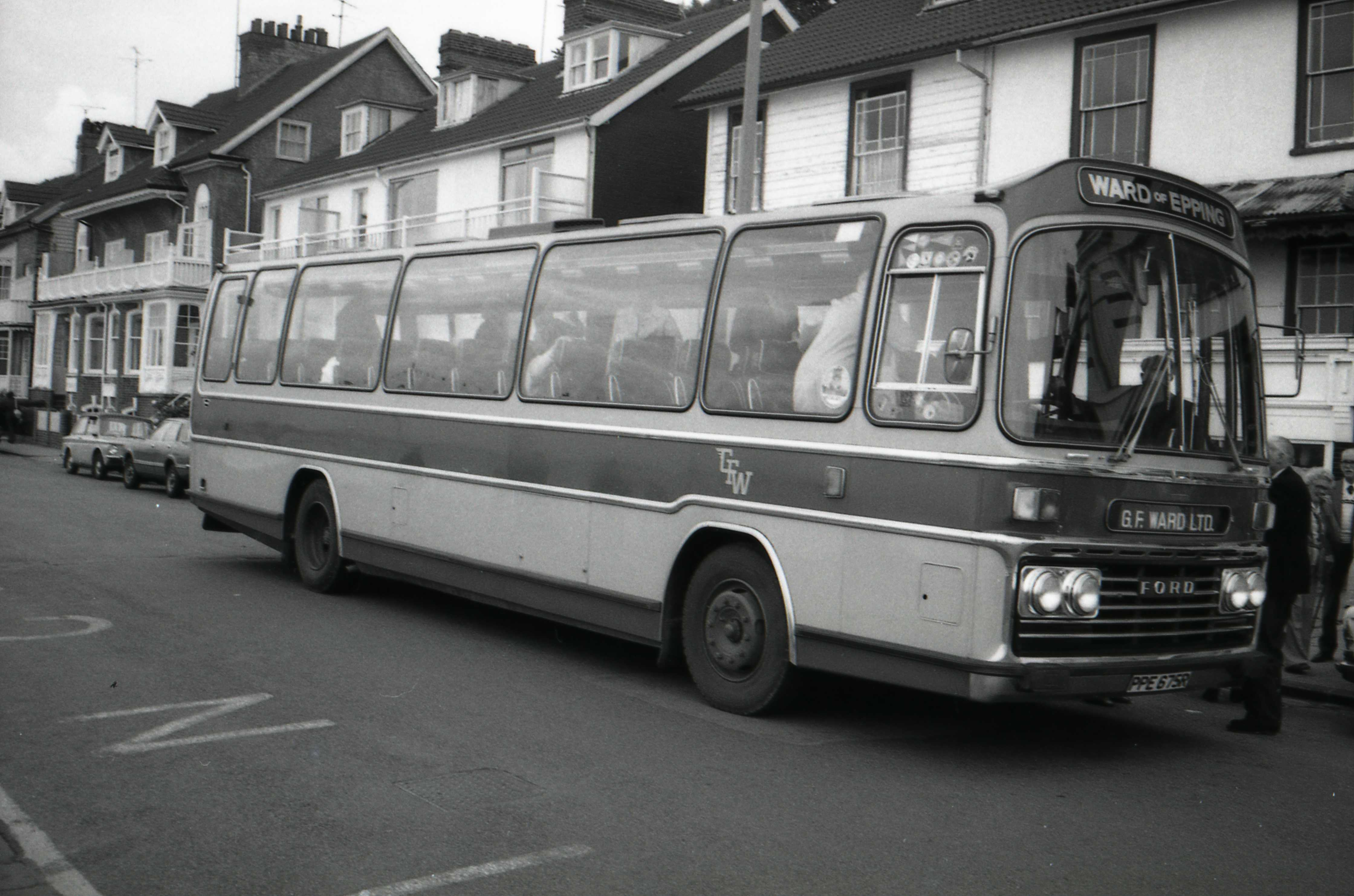
- Ford R1114 with Plaxton body

Overview
- Manufacturer: Ford
- Assembly: Dagenham

Body and chassis
- Doors: 1
- Floor type: Step-entrance

Powertrain
- Engine: Diesel
- Power output: 140 bhp
- Transmission: Manual or automatic

Dimensions
- Length: R192 and R1014, 10 metres R226 and R1114, 11 metres
- Width: 2.5 metres
- Height: 3.0 metres

The Ford R series was a range of single-decker bus and single-decker coach chassis, built by Ford that evolved from designs made by Thames Trader until the mid-1960s. A number of components were shared with the D-series lorry, including the engine which was mounted vertically at the front of the vehicle, ahead of the front axle so as to provide a passenger entrance opposite the driver. The original R192 and longer R226 models later became the R1014 and R1114 variants (nominally 10 and 11 metres long respectively with 140 bhp engines) which with constant revision and upgrading had become R1015 and R1115 by the mid-1980s. In an attempt to lower the floor height of the vehicle, the turbocharged diesel engine was tilted over to one side around 1978. Synchromesh transmission was fitted as standard but some later examples were equipped with Allison automatic gearboxes to ease the driver's workload in urban areas. It ceased production in 1985.

Hyundai licensed this bus to 'R Bus' in 1970s.

== Popularity ==
In the United Kingdom the design was popular during the 1970s, when considerable financial assistance was available to operators for fleet renewal, but following the election of the Conservative Government in 1979, the subsidy money began to dry up causing demand for full-size buses and coaches to decline and the last R series was built around 1986. Front-engined buses have generally fallen out of favour in Europe, as new accessibility requirements favour rear- or side-engined designs so a low front entrance can be provided. Few examples of the Ford R series remain in current passenger use, but many have gone on to second lives as mobile homes and stock car transporters.

== Major users ==
A significant user of the type was Jersey Motor Transport, who, during the 1970s and 1980s, purchased little else. Its fleet consisted 100% of this bus model for several years during this period, and was chosen because of the manufacturer's willingness to supply chassis of non-standard width and length to suit local size limits. Many of these vehicles received bodywork by Duple whose narrow-width Dominant also found buyers on other chassis in the UK, but earlier examples were constructed by Willowbrook and later versions by Wadham Stringer. JMT also had a number of longer and wider examples, which had started life in the late 1960s with Trimdon Motor Services in North East England: these Plaxton-bodied buses required special dispensation to operate on the island, being restricted to certain services where the roads could accommodate them. All were sold for further use after a few years. A similar model was used by the Inner London Education Authority as school buses.
