= Duple Laser =

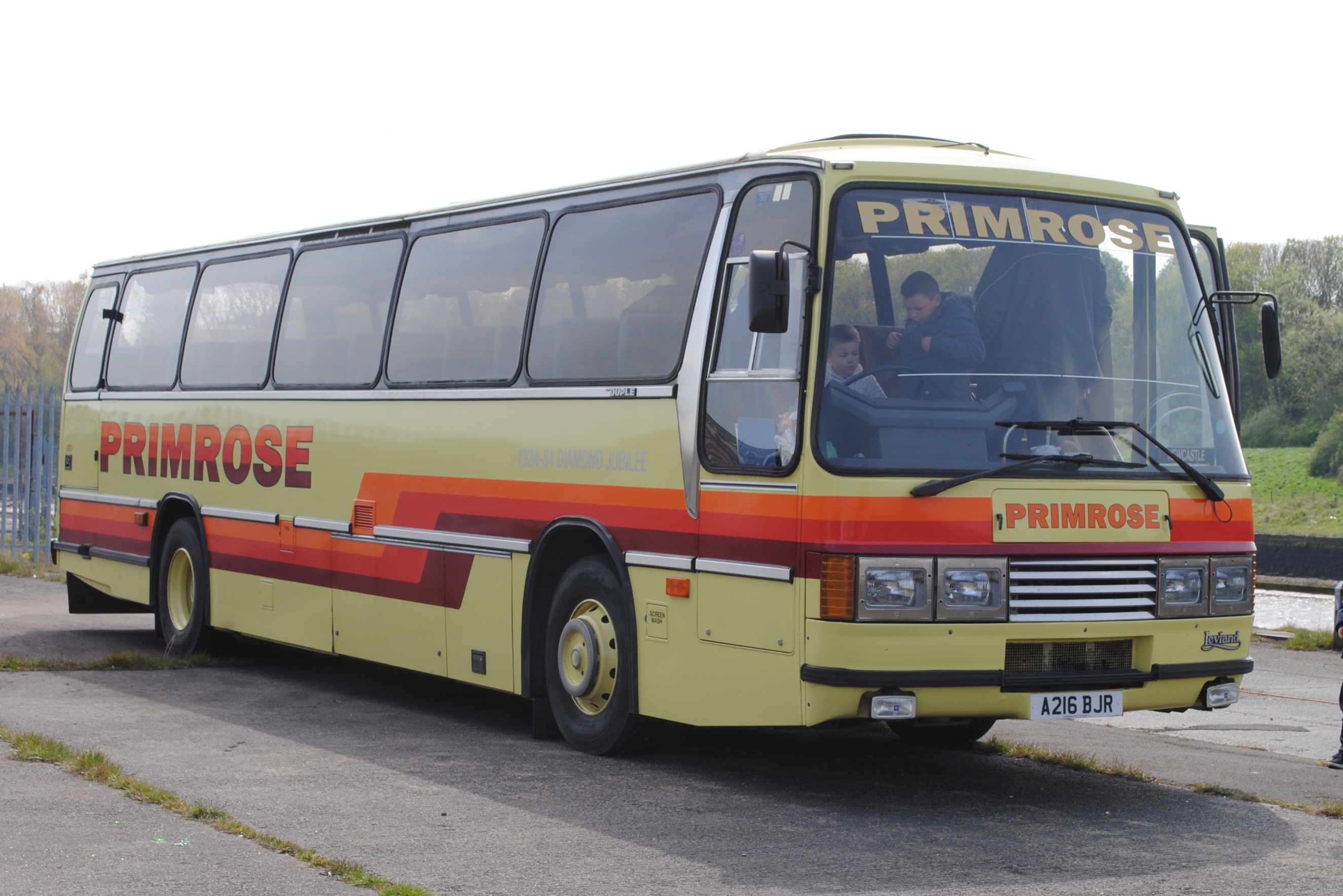
- Duple Laser body on Leyland Tiger chassis

Overview
- Manufacturer: Duple
- Production: 1983–1986

Body and chassis
- Doors: 1
- Floor type: Step entrance
- Chassis: Bedford YNT & YNV; DAF MB200; Leyland Tiger; Volvo B10M
- Related: Duple Calypso; Duple Caribbean

Dimensions
- Length: 11 or 12 metres (36 or 39 ft)

Chronology
- Predecessor: Duple Dominant
- Successor: Duple 320

The Duple Laser was a design of a coach bodywork built by Duple between 1983 and 1986. It replaced the long-running Duple Dominant body as Duple's standard medium-height coach of the mid 1980s.

== Variants ==
The original Laser was introduced in 1983 as Duple's entry-level / mass-market coach and was available on various 11 and 12 metre long mid-engined Bedford, Leyland and Volvo chassis. The design featured gasket glazing which distinguished it from the contemporary high-floor Duple Caribbean and semi-integral Duple Calypso (both of which had bonded glazing). Quad headlamps and a small chrome grille were shared with the Caribbean, although the Calypso's twin headlamps and wider grille could be specified as an option.

At the end of 1984 the Laser range was given a facelift and renamed the Laser 2. The main differences were a switch to bonded glazing and a revised front with twin headlamps and plastic grille, again shared with the contemporary Caribbean II. Additionally, the Laser 2 became available on mid-engined DAF chassis.

The Laser Express and Laser 2 Express were dual-purpose versions with bus-type entrance door and other modifications intended for use on express and interurban services. These were eligible for the British Government's New Bus Grant until this subsidy on new buses was terminated in 1984.

== Replacement ==
At the end of 1985 the new Duple 320 and 340 were launched as replacements for the Laser and Caribbean ranges respectively. The remaining stock of Laser coaches entered service during 1986.

== Gallery ==
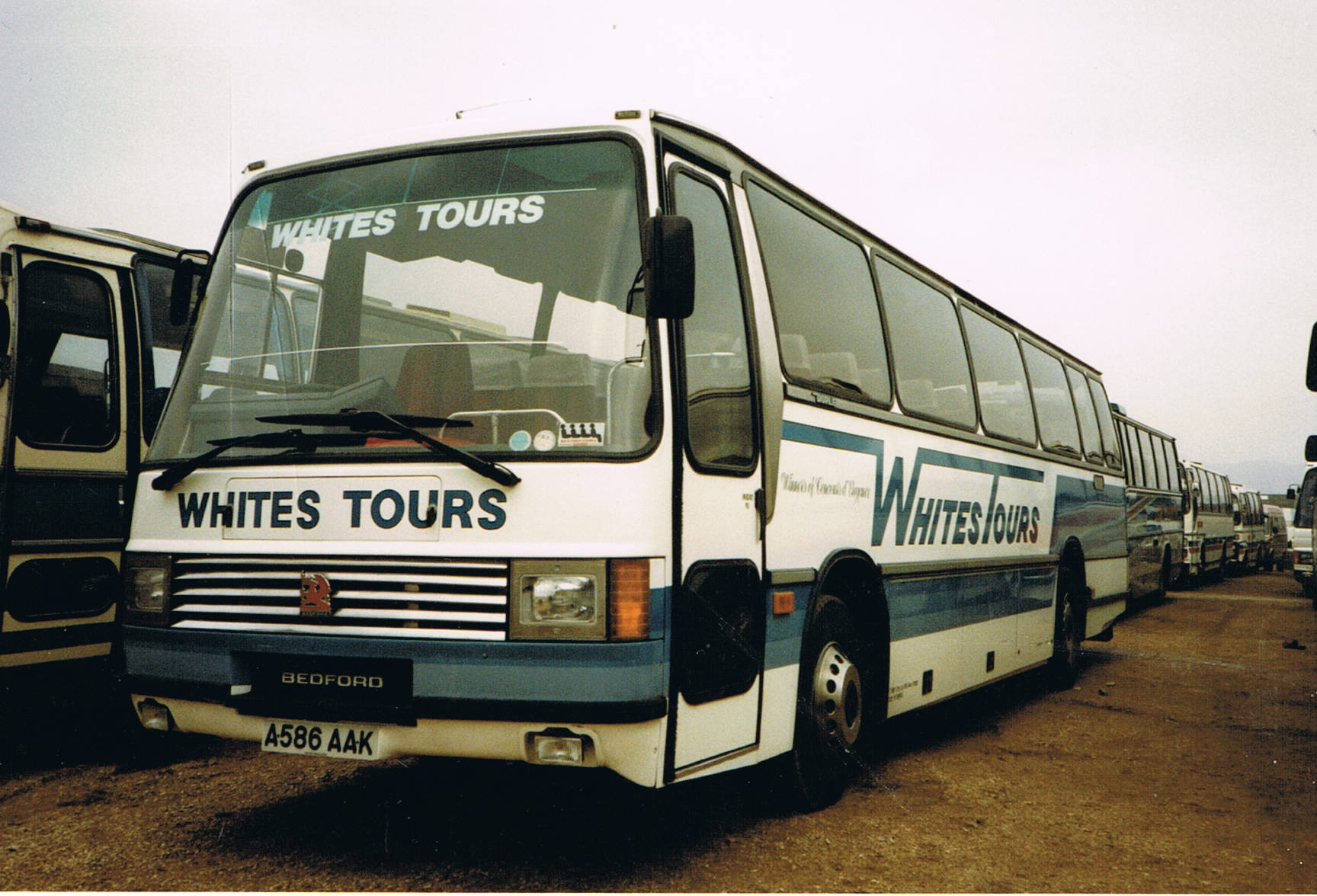
Duple Laser on 11m Bedford YNT chassis with optional Calypso-style grille

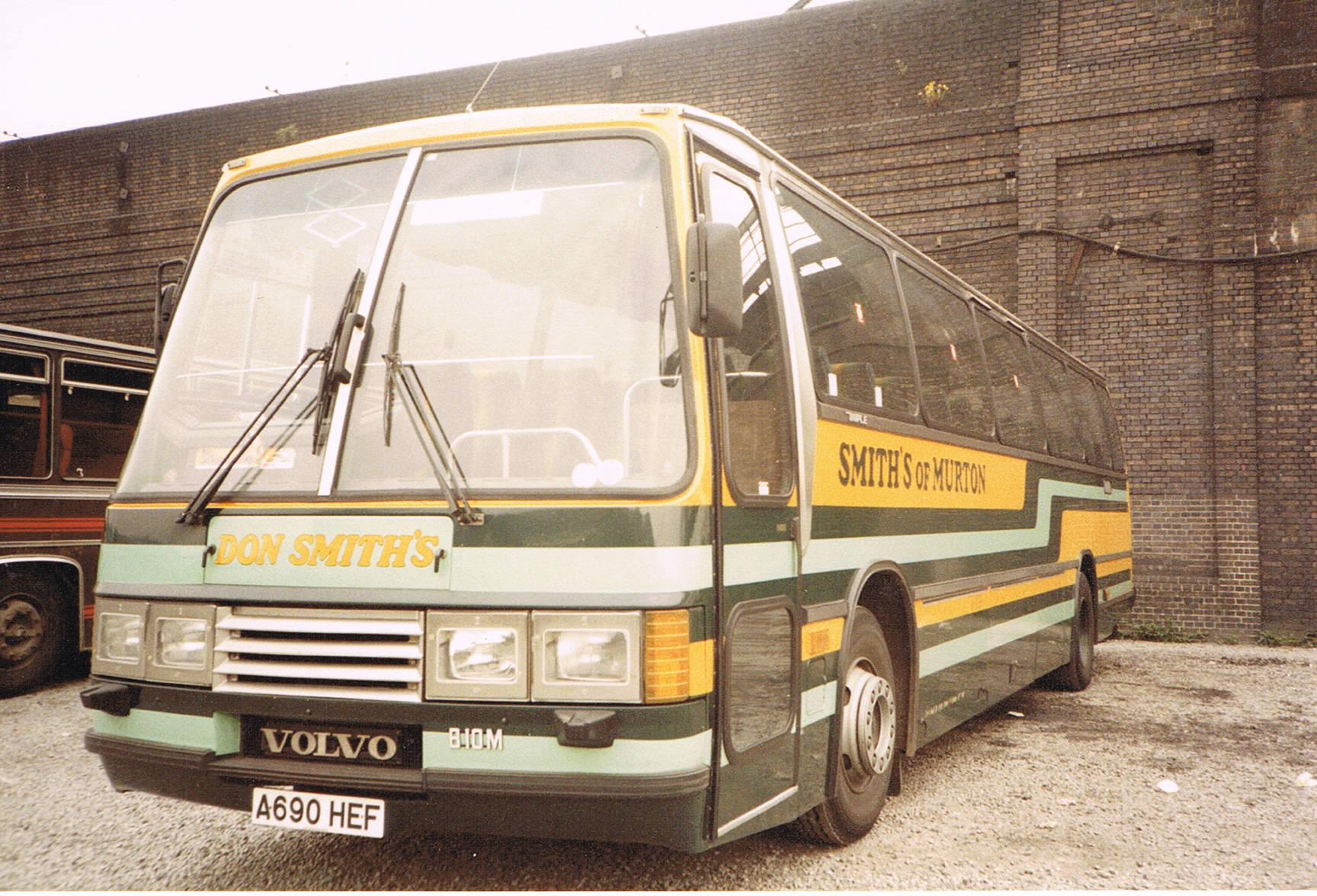
Duple Laser on 12m Volvo B10M chassis

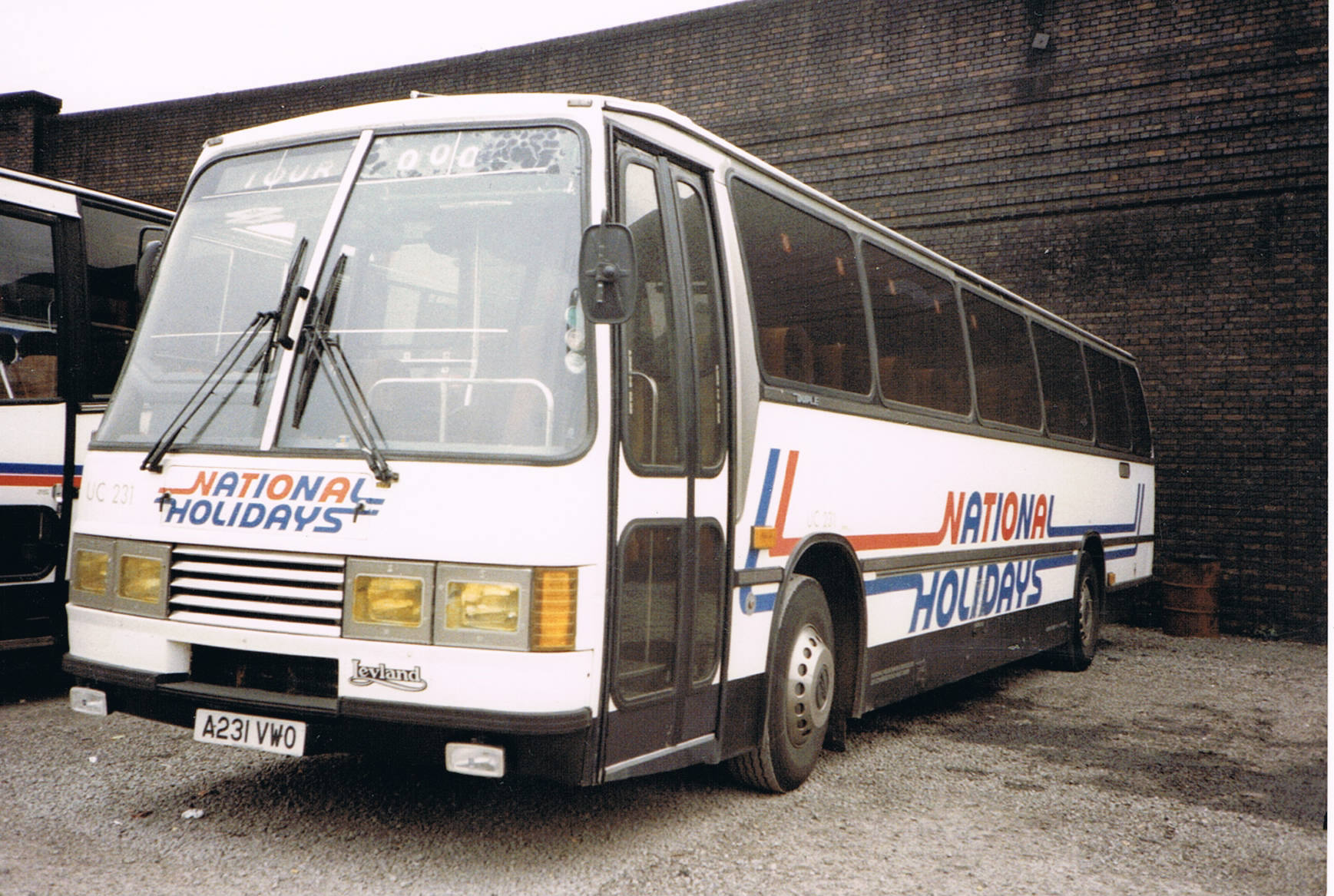
Duple Laser Express on 12m Leyland Tiger chassis

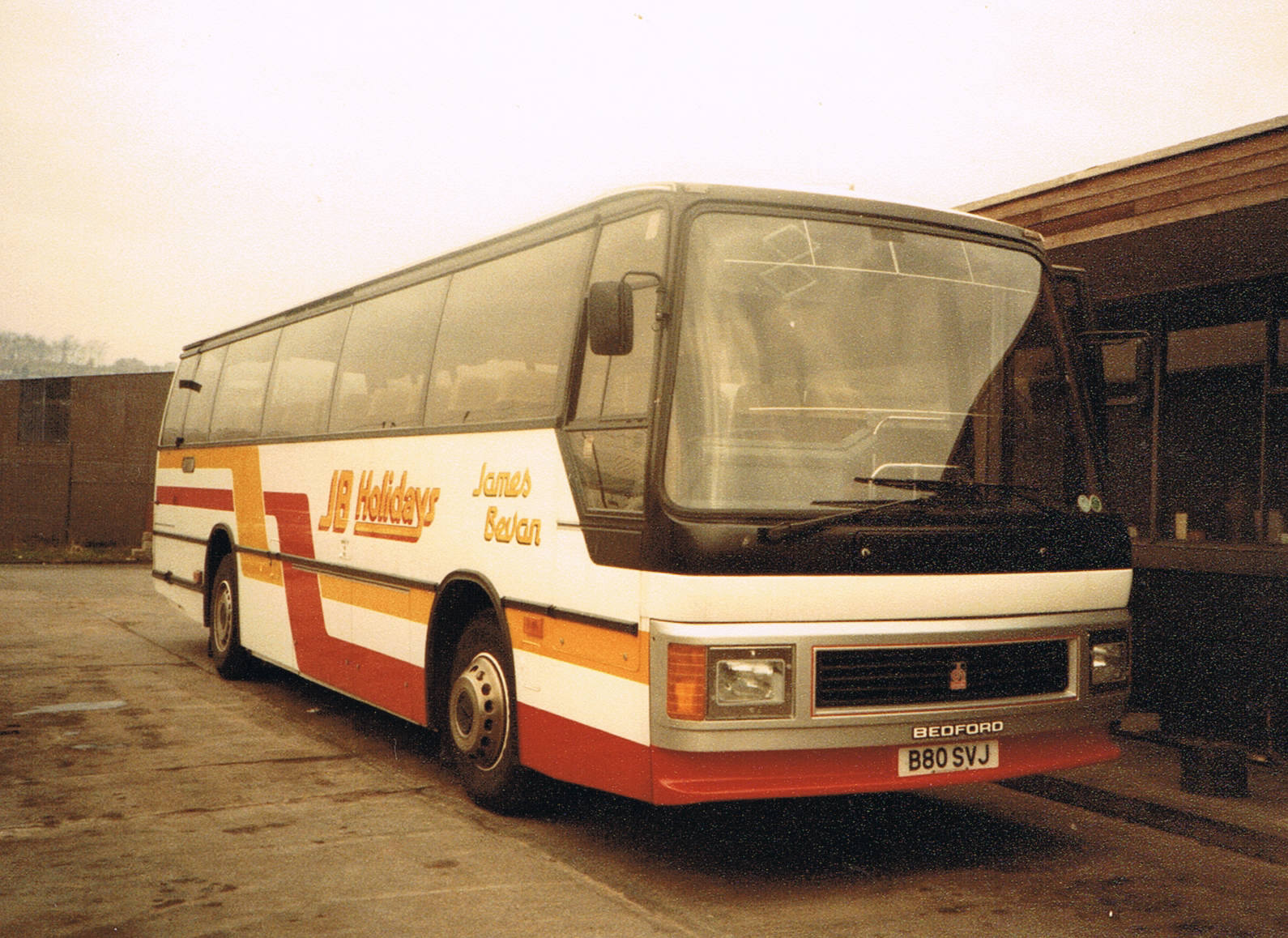
Duple Laser 2 on 11m Bedford YNT chassis

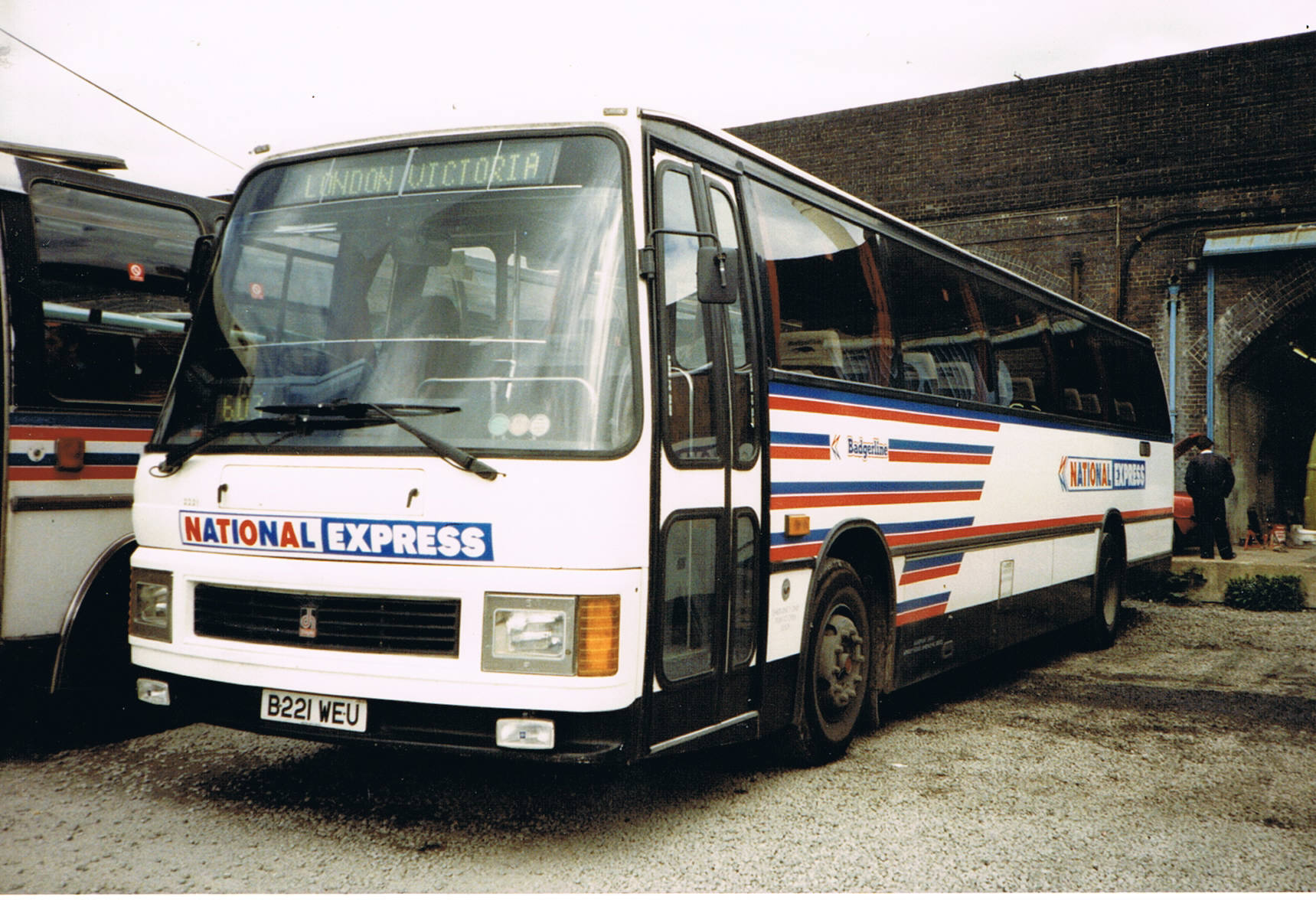
Duple Laser 2 Express on 12m Leyland Tiger chassis

== See also ==
- Plaxton Paramount
- List of buses
