= Wadham Stringer =

English ambulance and bus manufacturer

- Industry: Automotive
- Products: Buses

Wadham Stringer was an English vehicle distributor as well as a specialist manufacturer of ambulance, coach, bus and tanker bodies.

== History ==
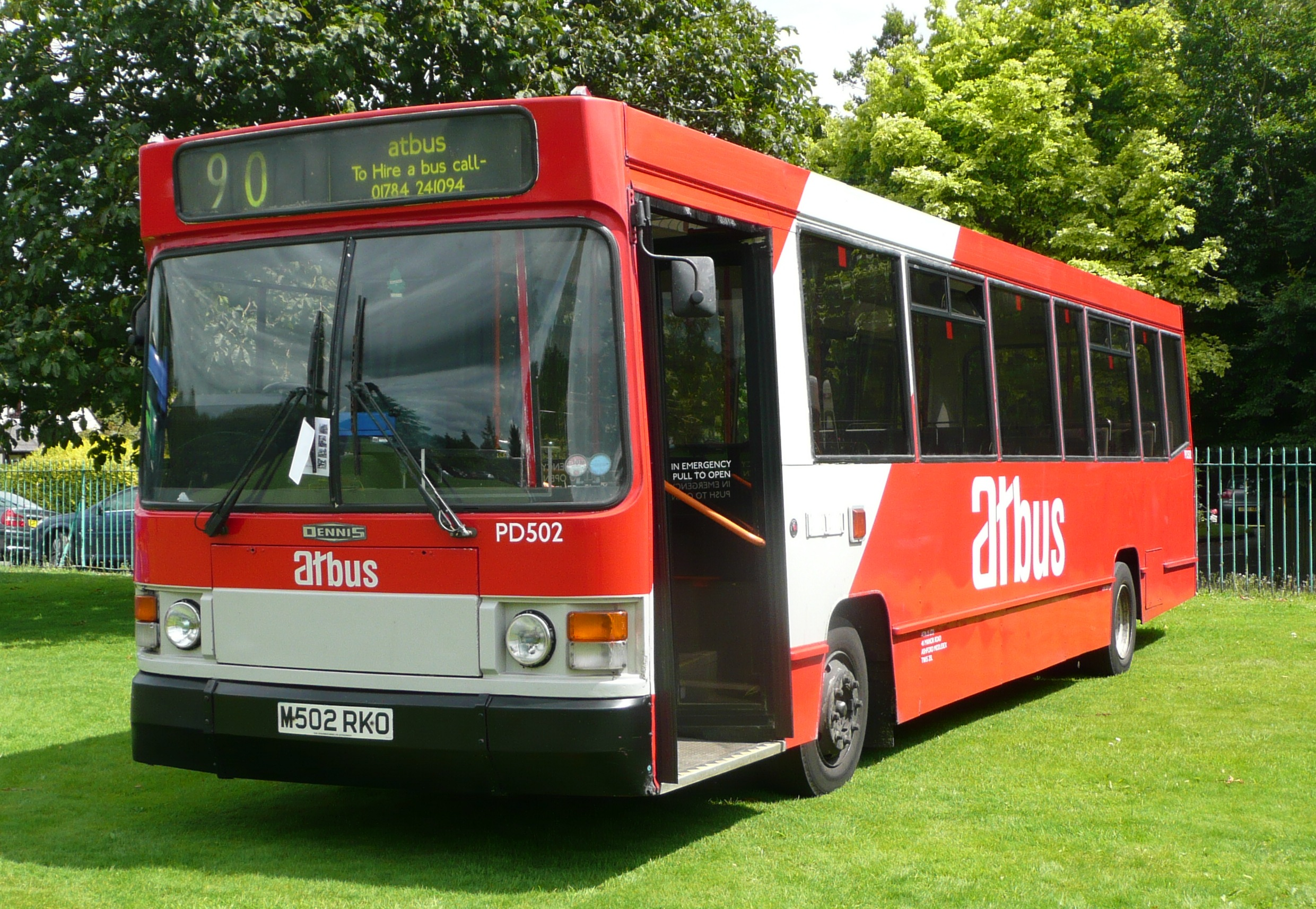
Wadham Stringer bodied Dennis Dart

Wadham Stringer was formed when Wadham merged with Stringer Motors in 1968. In 1972 it acquired Portsmouth based bodybuilder Sparshatt Group.. By 1978 it was a distributor for BL, Vauxhall and Ford cars as well as British Leyland commercial vehicles. Other activities included the GRP manufacture of boats and distribution of agricultural equipment through its subsidiary, H Beare & Sons.

In the 1960s, it had been an Austin, Jaguar, MG and Wolseley franchisee.

In 1979, the business was sold to Tozer Kemsley & Millbourn. In 1993, it was purchased by Universal Vehicle Group.

After being placed in administration, the factory was acquired by Salvador Caetano in 1998.
