= Blue Bus of Penwortham =

British bus operating company

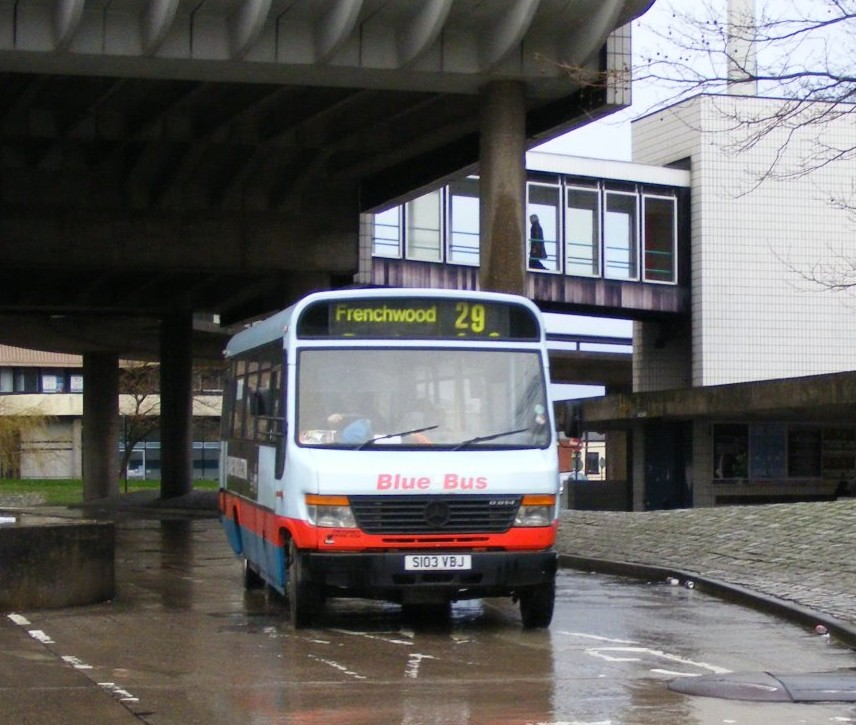
- Plaxton Beaver bodied Mercedes-Benz Vario at Preston bus station in December 2007
- Founded: 2006
- Ceased operation: 2019
- Headquarters: Penwortham
- Service area: Preston
- Service type: Bus services

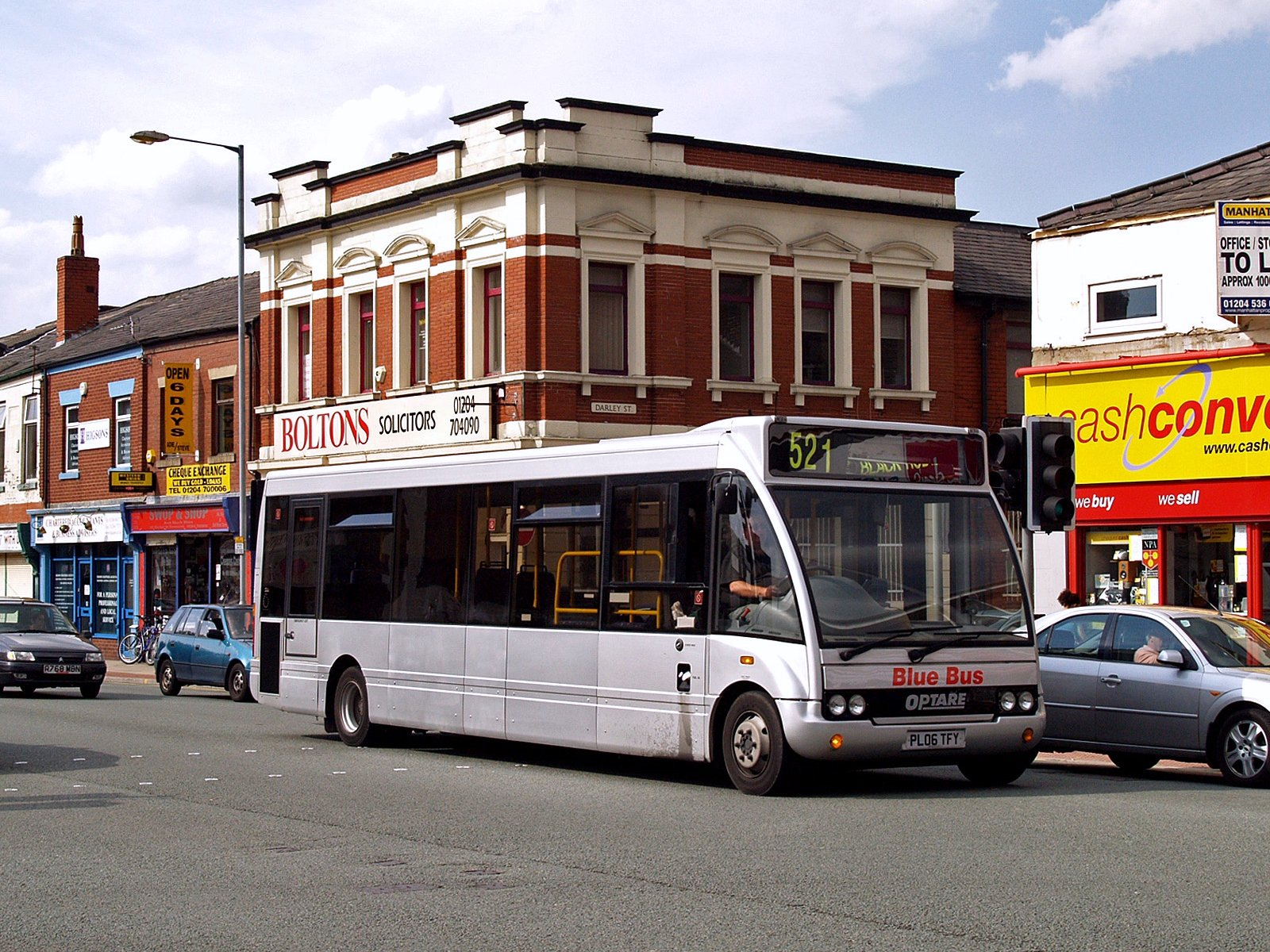
Optare Solo in Farnworth in July 2008

Blue Bus was a bus operator based in Penwortham, Lancashire. It operated many routes, including services to Preston City Centre.

== History ==
Blue Bus of Penwortham was formed by Roger Jarvis in early 2006, nine months after Jarvis sold Blue Bus of Bolton to Arriva North West and Wales in July 2005.

Roger Jarvis also purchased Whittaker's Coach Travel and revived the Blue Bus name from his former Blue Bus of Bolton operation.

In June 2009, with Stagecoach having purchased Preston Bus, bus usage of Stagecoach in Preston since the takeover in January had increased with better efficiency and a larger network. Blue Bus however incurred losses, forcing it to cease operating routes to Frenchwood and Broadgate.

== Services ==
Blue Bus of Penwortham operated numerous bus services. As well as standard local and inter-urban bus services, the company operated various school contracts and four Lancashire County Council financially supported services.

=== Former Routes ===
- 110 Leyland - Seven Stars - Moss Side - Croston - Bretherton - Tarleton - Mere Brow - Crossens - Churchtown - Southport
- 111 Preston - Leyland
- 112 Preston - Lostock Hall - Leyland - Croston - Bretherton

=== School Services ===
To cater for the hundreds of students travelling to school in the Preston area every day, Blue Bus operated seven contracted services to various schools. Routes 312, 709, 776 and 787 operated to schools in towns and villages including Lower Adlington, Bamber Bridge, Brindle, Charnock Richard, Chorley, Farington, Higher Walton, Hoghton, Hutton, Riley Green and Tardy Gate as well as in the base town of Penwortham.

== Fleet ==
The fleet consisted of smaller mini- or midibuses. Mercedes-Benz Varios with Plaxton Beaver bodywork were partially prevalent, with various examples of the type. Both the Plaxton Beaver 1 and Beaver 2 models were operated. Some buses had the older Mercedes-Benz 709D chassis. Vehicles were run in a cream livery with a blue and red skirt, with some others in a livery similar to the Blue Bus of Bolton livery, which were painted in pale blue.,

== See also ==
- List of bus operators of the United Kingdom
