= Blue Bus =

Blue Bus may refer to the following bus companies:

== In the United Kingdom ==
- Blue Bus and Coach Services, serving Greater Manchester, Lancashire and Merseyside
- Blue Bus of Penwortham, Lancashire
- Blue Bus of North Lanarkshire, also known as Blue Bus of Shotts
- Blue Bus Services, or Tailby & George, in Willington, Derbyshire
- Blue Bus Services, an operating division of Busways, Tyne and Wear

== In North America ==
- West Vancouver Blue Bus, or West Vancouver Municipal Transit, Canada
- Blue Bus lines, in Portland, Oregon, U.S.
- Big Blue Bus, in Santa Monica and western Los Angeles, California, U.S.
- University of Michigan Transit Services, nicknamed "Blue Bus", Ann Arbor, Michigan, U.S.
