= Plaxton Cheetah =

Midicoach body on Mercedes-Benz chassis

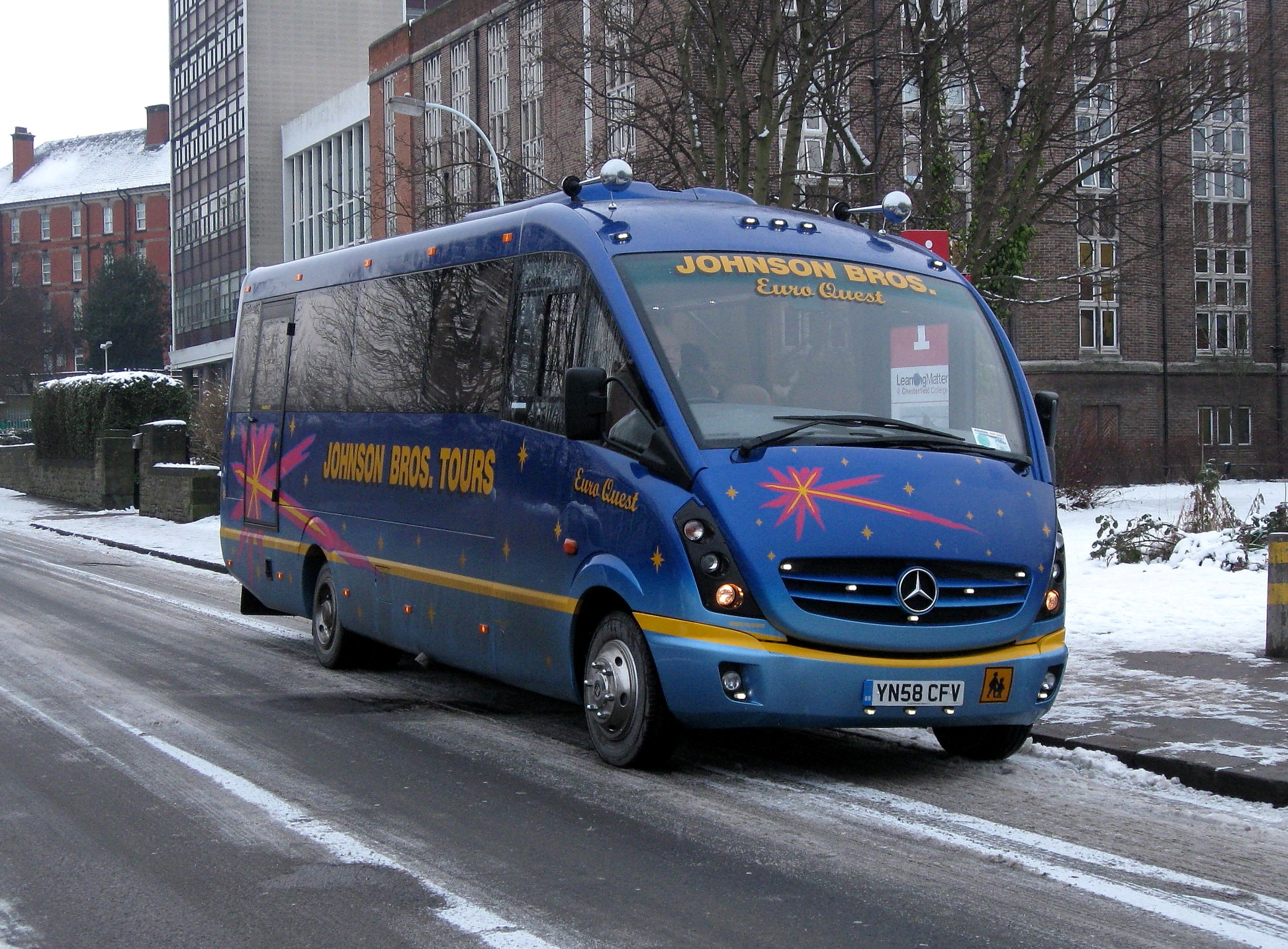
- Johnson Bros Plaxton Cheetah 2 bodied Mercedes-Benz Vario in Chesterfield in February 2009

Overview
- Manufacturer: Plaxton
- Production: 1997–2014 (Cheetah/Cheetah 2); 2015–2019 (Cheetah XL)
- Assembly: Scarborough, North Yorkshire, England; Anston, South Yorkshire, England

Body and chassis
- Body style: Minicoach (Cheetah/Cheetah 2); Midicoach (Cheetah XL)
- Doors: 1 (in-swing door)
- Floor type: Step entrance
- Chassis: Mercedes-Benz Vario; Mercedes-Benz Atego (Cheetah XL)

Powertrain
- Engine: Mercedes-Benz OM904 (Vario); Mercedes-Benz OM934 (Atego)
- Capacity: 29-33 seated (Cheetah/Cheetah 2); 33-36 seated (Cheetah XL)
- Power output: 150 brake horsepower (110 kW) (Vario 815D)
- Transmission: 5 or 6-speed manual 4-speed Allison automatic Mercedes PowerShift 3 (Atego)

Dimensions
- Length: 7.0–8.1 metres (23.0–26.6 ft) (Cheetah/Cheetah 2); 9.6 metres (31 ft) (Cheetah XL)
- Width: 2.4 metres (7 ft 10 in)
- Height: 3.0 metres (9.8 ft)

Chronology
- Predecessor: Plaxton Beaver

The Plaxton Cheetah is a minicoach body manufactured by Plaxton on Mercedes-Benz chassis between 1997 and 2019. Between 1997 and 2014, the Cheetah was built on Mercedes-Benz Vario chassis, with a redesigned midicoach variant called the Plaxton Cheetah XL built on Mercedes-Benz Atego chassis between 2015 and the body's discontinuation in 2019.

== Design ==
=== Cheetah ===
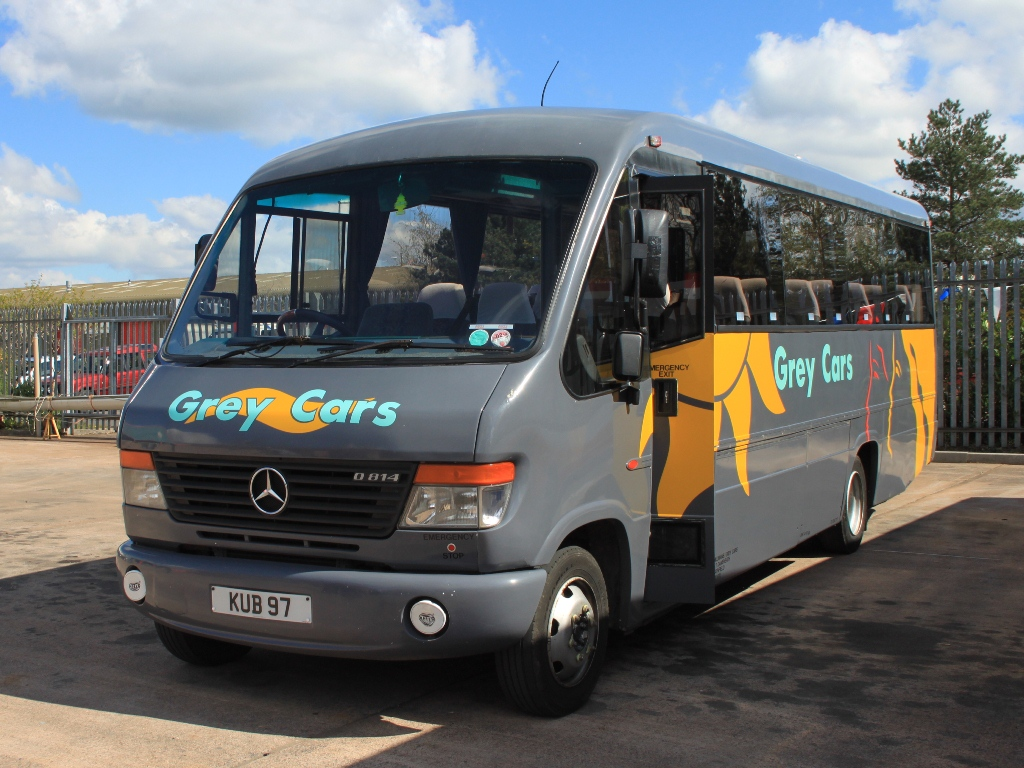
Grey Cars Plaxton Cheetah 1 bodied Mercedes-Benz Vario in Heathfield in April 2013

Launched at the Coach & Bus '97 expo in Birmingham on the 8.5 metres (28 ft) Mercedes-Benz Vario 814D chassis, the Cheetah served as a replacement for Plaxton's first-generation Beaver body, and was initially marketed towards luxury minicoach operators. Retaining the headlights and the grille of the original Vario chassis cowl, the Cheetah featured a sloping one-piece curved front windscreen and a body built with a combination of aluminium and fibreglass panels, and two side lockers and a rear boot with a carrying capacity of 2.875 cubic metres (101.5 cu ft) or 3.63 cubic metres (128 cu ft) depending on seating configuration. The Cheetah was launched with gasket window glazing, however from 1998 onwards, bonded double glazed windows were also able to be specified.

The step-entrance interior of the Cheetah, accessible via an in-swing door behind the front axle leading to three steps up to the passenger area, featured an entirely flat floor with no wheelarch intrusion, addressing operator and passenger complaints about legroom at seats on the rear axles of minicoaches. The coach had a seating capacity of between 29 and 33, depending on legroom and luggage bay requirements, and additional options included a Sutrak air conditioning unit, courier seats, television and video systems, a servery, tables, a chemical toilet and recliners. Updates for the Cheetah in 2000 included new overhead luggage racks and floor covering also fitted to the Paragon and Panther full-size coaches, as well as larger luggage bay door handles and easier access to the battery compartment.

Cheetahs could also be configured as public service minibuses, with a full-sized destination display capable of being fitted to the roof.

=== Cheetah 2 ===
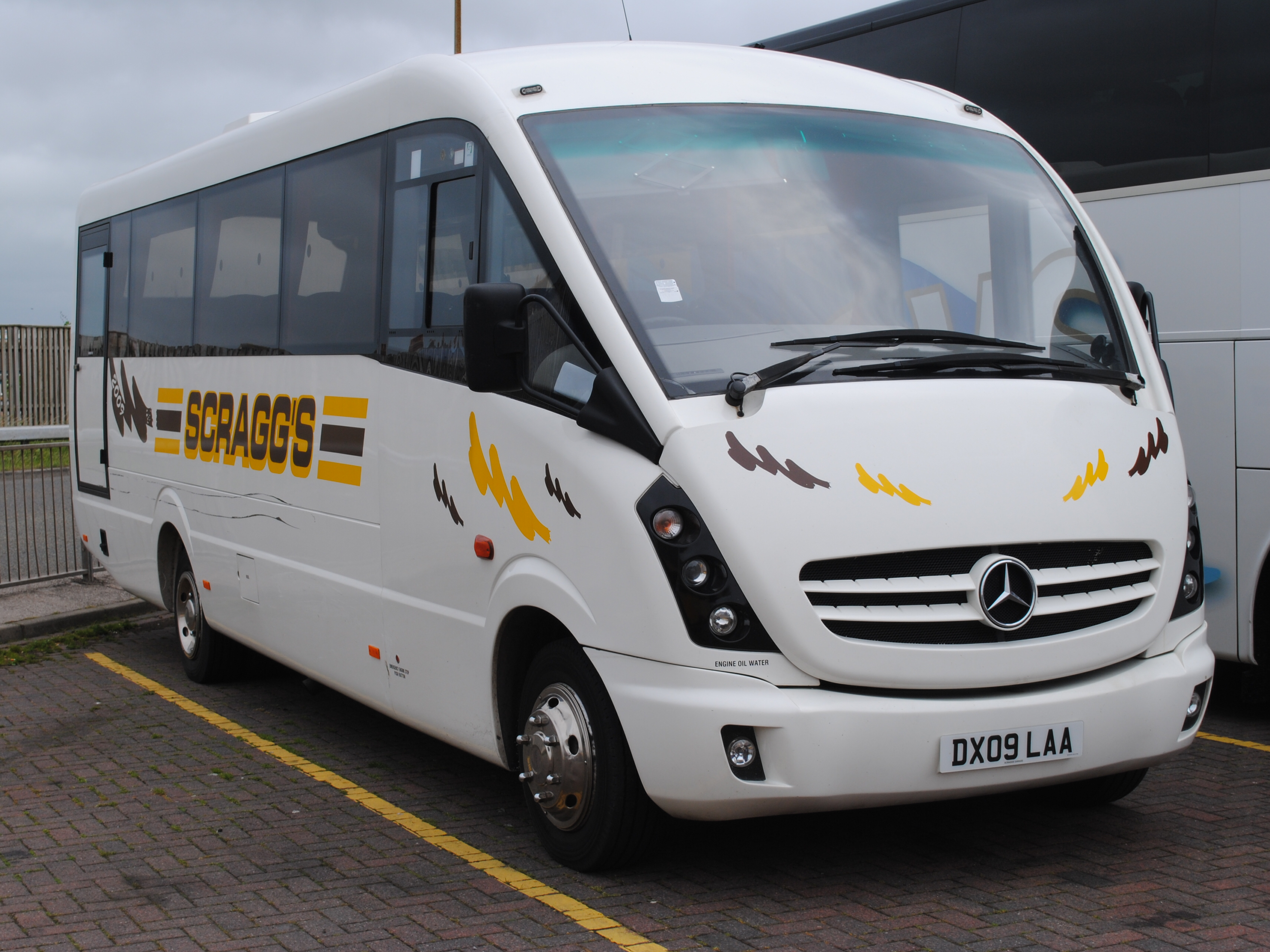
Scaggs Coaches Plaxton Cheetah 2 bodied Mercedes-Benz Vario in June 2013

The Cheetah 2 was launched in July 2007, shortly following Plaxton's purchase by Alexander Dennis, on the new 816 variant of the Vario chassis. Capable of a 156 bhp (116 kW) power output alongside being fitted with a new six-speed Mercedes-Benz manual transmission, with options also available for a more powerful 156 bhp (116 kW) engine and a Allison 5-speed automatic transmission, the Cheetah 2 was also equipped with a new front steel spring suspension and rear air suspension, all-around disc brakes and a Telma retarder as standard.

The Cheetah 2 received an external facelift removed the Vario fascia with a more streamlined Plaxton design, including a larger front bonnet and rear boot for improved practicality, a raked rear and an unbroken central curve from the front windscreen to the bottom of the grille. The original Vario headlights were replaced with circular halogen bulbs, with similar LED lights replacing smaller variants on the rear of the body. Internally, the Cheetah 2 retained the original Cheetah's seating capacity, however it received numerous updates including a new dashboard with upgraded demisters and revised controls for the audio system and satnav, redesigned luggage racks and interior trims, air conditioning as standard, the implementation of a mix of halogen and LED lighting, and the introduction of three trim levels: the entry level Club, the mid-range Elegance and the top-of-the-range Grand Tourer, the latter of which featured air conditioning and double-glazed tinted windows as standard. A variant of the Cheetah fitted with a wheelchair ramp to make the vehicle compliant with the Disability Discrimination Act 1995 was later launched during 2008.

With Mercedes-Benz discontinuing the Vario chassis in September 2013, the final Cheetah 2 was delivered to Perryman's Buses of Berwick-upon-Tweed in July 2014.

=== Cheetah XL ===
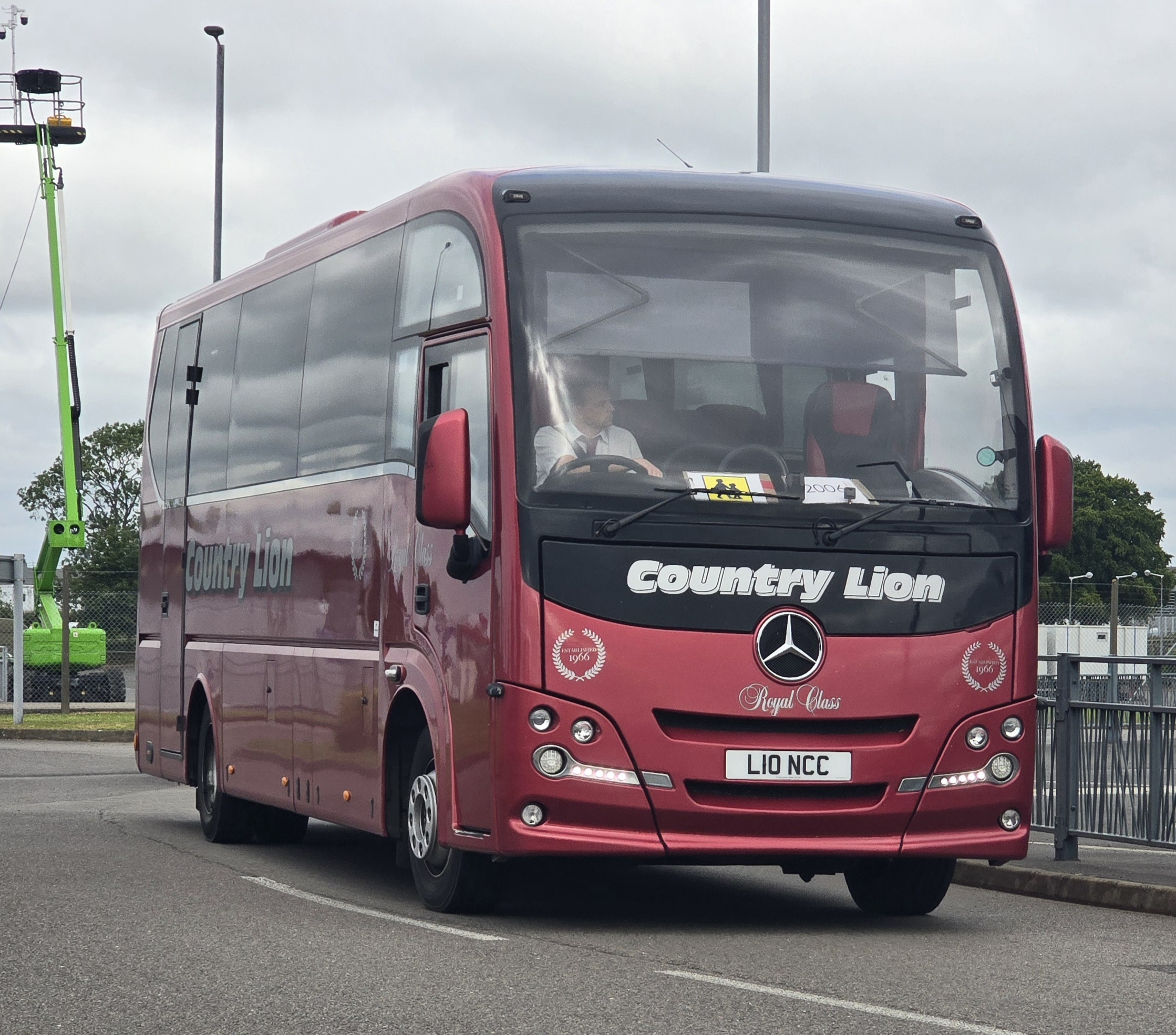
County Lion Plaxton Cheetah XL bodied Mercedes-Benz Atego at Silverstone Circuit in June 2024

Following the discontinuation of the Vario, the Cheetah was redesigned and relaunched as the Cheetah XL on the Euro VI-compliant 9 t Mercedes-Benz Atego rigid truck chassis in 2015. Constructed with a stainless steel frame and designed as a midicoach with a more powerful Mercedes-Benz OM934 engine, the 'XL' moniker denotes it as a larger vehicle compared to the original Cheetah, capable of carrying between 33 and 36 seated passengers depending on configuration. As a result of having an underfloor-mounted engine, the Cheetah XL has a flat front and rear resembling larger Plaxton coaches such as the Leopard, but retains design elements from the Atego such as a separate driver's door and part of the front cab including windscreen wiper housings. The centrally-mounted Mercedes-Benz three-point star badge also functioned as an air intake for the front windscreen demister.

Internally, the Cheetah XL retained the in-swing door behind the rear axle compared to other Atego coach designs, albeit requiring five steps up to reach the passenger area compared to the original Cheetah's three. Due to the body being mounted higher above the Atego chassis as opposed to directly on the chassis, the Cheetah XL had a doubled luggage capacity of 8 cubic metres (280 cu ft) accessible via a boot and two nearside luggage lockers. Standard interior features included reading lights and air conditioning, a drop-down TV screen, an AM/FM radio with CD player, a PA system and driver and courier microphones, with additional options for a chemical toilet and a servery.

Plaxton announced in October 2019 that they had decided to discontinue the Cheetah XL in favour of the full-size Leopard and Panther coaches as a result of poor sales, with the Cheetah XL unable to meet the same high sales figures as the original Cheetah and Cheetah 2.
