= Reeve Burgess =

Bus body manufacturer in Derbyshire, England

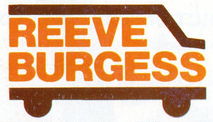
- Company type: Private (until 1980); Subsidiary (1980–1991)
- Industry: Bus manufacturing; Ambulance conversions
- Founded: 1888; 137 years ago
- Founder: Harry Reeve
- Defunct: April 1991; 34 years ago
- Fate: Bus manufacturing merged into Plaxton; Ambulance manufacturing sold to Mellor Coachcraft
- Headquarters: Pilsley, North East Derbyshire, England
- Products: Reeve Burgess Beaver; Reeve Burgess Pointer; Reeve Burgess Harrier
- Parent: Plaxton (1980–1991)

Reeve Burgess, also known as Reebur, was a British bus and ambulance body manufacturer based in Pilsley, North East Derbyshire. It was a subsidiary of Plaxton from July 1980 until the company's closure in April 1991.

== History ==
=== Foundation ===
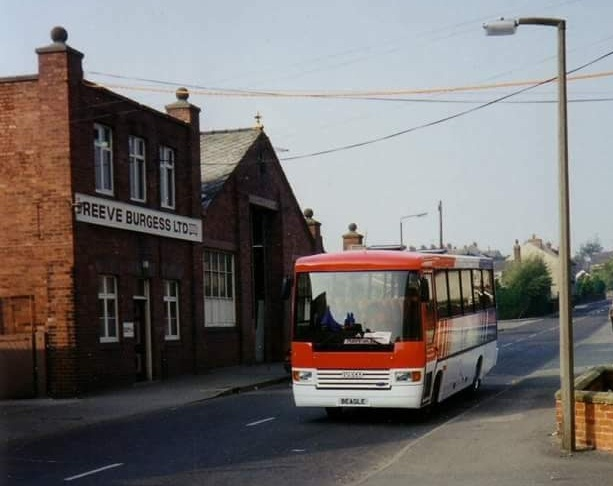
Demonstrator Reeve Burgess Beagle bodied Iveco minicoach passing the Reeve Burgess factory in Pilsley

The original company known as Harry Reeve was founded in Bridge Street, Pilsley, Derbyshire in 1888, initially carrying out work as the local wheelwright and blacksmith. Harry Reeve progressed to building a wide variety of horse-drawn vehicles, including pony traps for milk delivery vehicles, and horse-drawn ambulances for local collieries.

After World War I, the founder was joined by his son John (Jack) Reeve, who then became involved in the business for over 50 years. In 1925, after the death of Harry Reeve, the company was formed into a limited company partnership with George Kenning of Clay Cross and became Reeve and Kenning Ltd. A wide variety of vehicles were then produced, including brewery trucks and the company's first buses and coaches, with timber framing, iron and panelwork, bodying, painting and signwriting all completed on site in Pilsley, and the company became a major employer in the North East Derbyshire area, offering apprenticeships for various manufacturing trades.

In 1958 the company became Reeve (Coachbuilders) Limited after the Kenning family interest was bought by the Reeve family, thereby reverting to the original founding company. The managing director was Jack Reeve, who by this time had been joined by his son Harry Reeve.

During the 1960s and early 1970s, a number of developments took place, in particular the manufacture of demountable box van bodies, and Robinsons of Chesterfield was the first operator to place a large order for this particular type of product. Derbyshire County Council's first mobile library fleet was also produced during the mid 1960s.

Following the sale of the company in 1974 to T.H. Burgess Holdings of Worcester, the name was changed to Reeve Burgess Ltd. A rationalisation of the company's products took place and a far greater degree of specialisation was introduced.

In 1976 the first venture was made into the small coach market with the introduction of the Reebur 17, based mainly on the Bedford CF chassis and later on the Ford Transit chassis, and the company had considerable success with this vehicle over the next few years. Following this, Reeve Burgess built a number of smaller PSVs on MAN chassis. Around 1979, the company started to convert Mercedes vans into luxury minicoaches.

=== Acquisition by Plaxton and demise ===
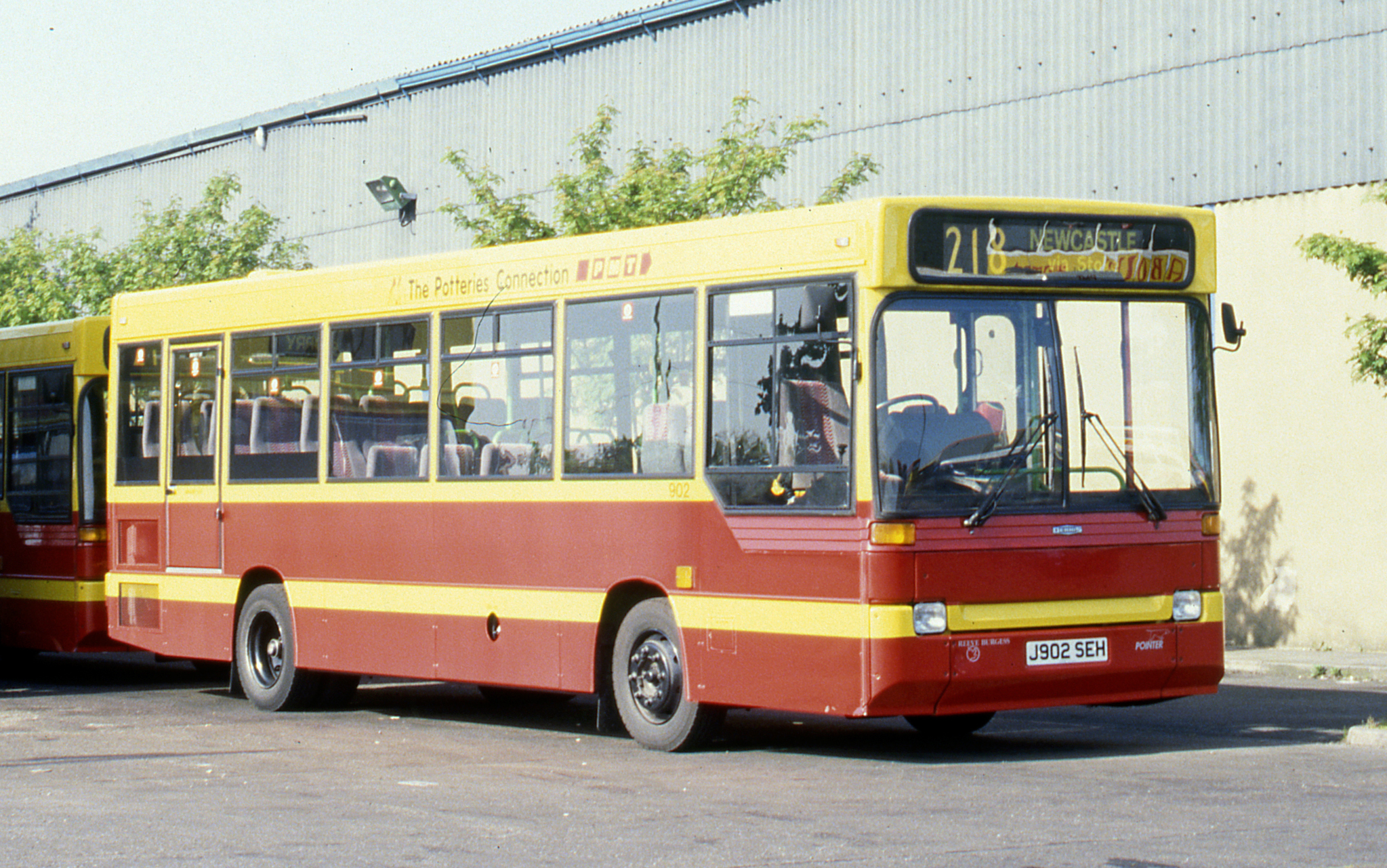
PMT Reeve Burgess Pointer bodied Dennis Dart in 1992; this design was renamed the Plaxton Pointer and remained in production until 2006

In July 1980, Reeve Burgess was acquired by Scarborough based coach manufacturer Plaxton for £600,000 (equivalent to £3,250,000 in 2023), becoming a subsidiary company of a larger group of companies acquired by Plaxton. Harry Reeve, great-grandson of the original founder, remained at Reeve Burgess after the 1980 takeover as Sales Director until its closure.

Prior to the deregulation of local bus services in 1986, the National Bus Company placed a large order for minibuses with Reeve Burgess, with additional premises acquired in Stonebroom to meet demand; at this point the number of staff Reeve Burgess employed was in the region of 260. A new paint shop was also needed in order to meet production requirements, and this was expanded again during 1986 in order for the company to carry out the maximum amount of painting on its own premises, and over 600 vehicle were built and sold.

Despite a healthy order book at Reeve Burgess, however, Plaxton began suffering financial losses in line with a downturn in the large coach industry amid the early 1990s recession. After prior job cuts at the factories did not stave off poor financial results for Plaxton, Reeve Burgess' Pilsley and Stonebroom factories were closed in 1991, with all bus manufacturing and orders moved to Plaxton's Scarborough factory, resulting in the loss of 170 jobs. Plaxton retained Reeve Burgess' Beaver and Pointer designs at their Scarborough factory, with some of the latter receiving both Plaxton and Reeve Burgess body numbers, and later rebadged and marketed Beavers and Pointers as Plaxton vehicles, resulting in the gradual phasing out of the Reeve Burgess name by the end of 1992.

== Products ==
=== Bus and coach bodies ===
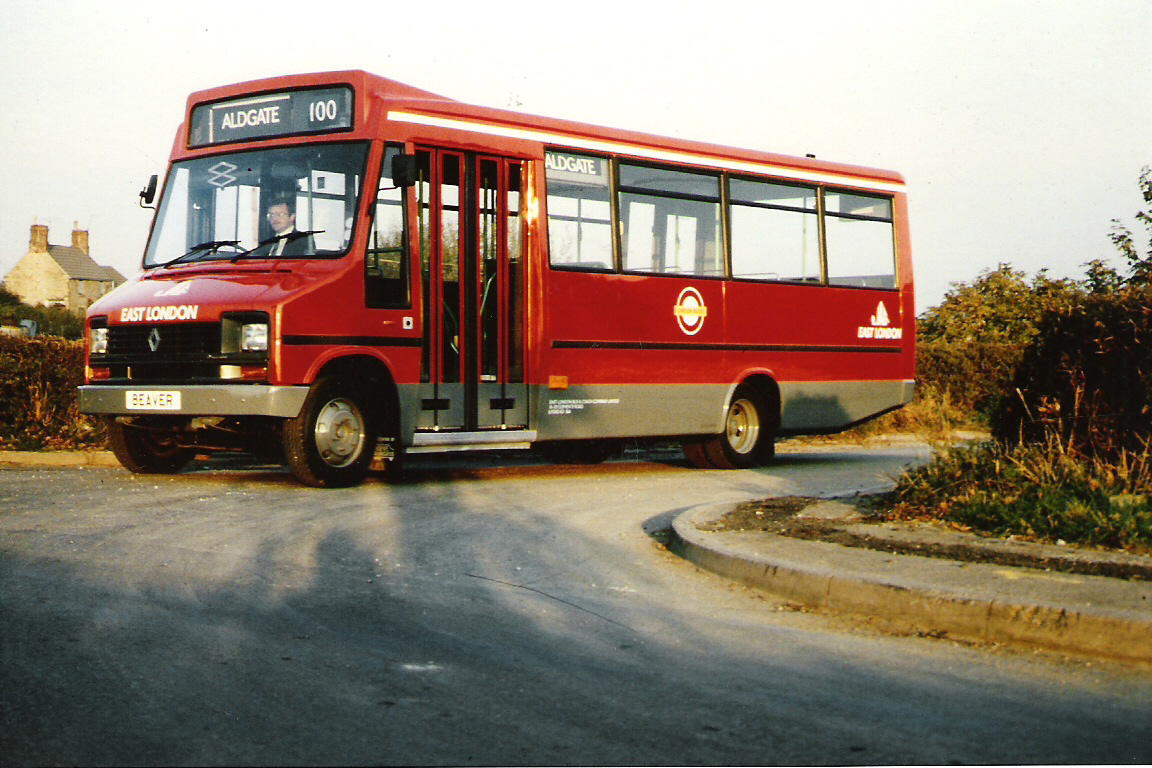
East London Reeve Burgess Beaver bodied Renault 50 minibus on display before delivery in 1991

Reeve Burgess mainly specialised on small minibus and minicoach bodies on van chassis. Products included:

- Beaver on Mercedes-Benz T2, Dodge 50 and Iveco Daily chassis; rebranded Plaxton Beaver by 1992,
- Beagle on Iveco Ford A70 chassis,
- Harrier on Leyland Swift chassis,
- Pointer on Dennis Dart chassis; rebranded Plaxton Pointer by 1992,
- Reebur 17 on Bedford CF and Ford Transit chassis,
- Riviera/RB26 on MAN VW 8.136, Leyland Tiger and Quest 80 chassis

Reeve Burgess also produced 12-25 seater van-derived minicoach bodies for the Iveco Daily, Mercedes-Benz TN, Mercedes-Benz O309 and Volkswagen LT chassis, and also produced bodies for Leyland Motors' Cub chassis.

=== Ambulances ===
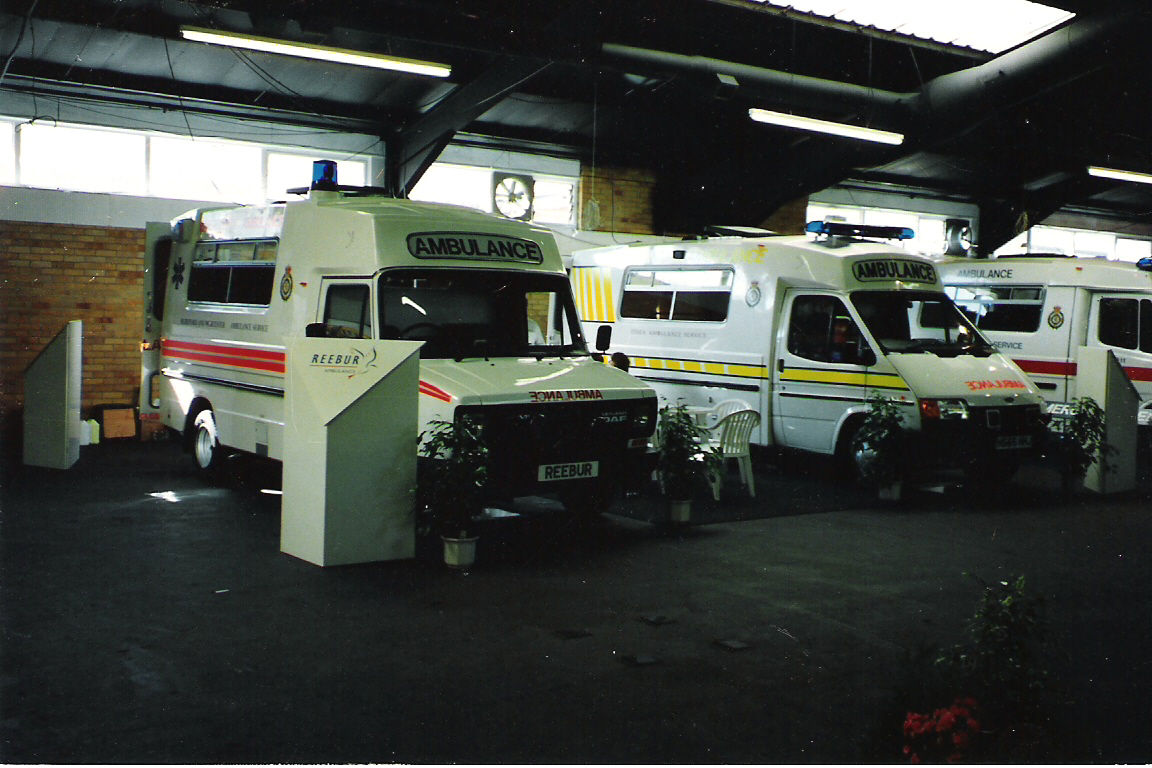
Reebur Ambulance-bodied Leyland DAF 200 and Ford Transit at a 1991 ambulance expo

Reeve Burgess started building fibreglass-bodied ambulance bodies at a factory in Tibshelf under the name 'Reebur Ambulance' in 1989, acquiring the toolings, assets and some staff from Hanlon Ambulance of Longford, Ireland, which closed in 1988 due to a series of industrial disputes. Reebur Ambulance manufactured ambulance bodies on Ford Transit, Freight Rover, Mercedes-Benz and Renault Master chassis cowls, with customers including the district health authorities of the counties of Clwyd and Humberside. Ambulance manufacturing was transferred to Rochdale minibus manufacturer Mellor Coachcraft in April 1991 amid the gradual closure of Reeve Burgess by Plaxton.

== See also ==
- Northern Counties, former bus body manufacturer also bought by Plaxton and merged into the company in 1999
