= Leyland Swift =

British single-deck midibus chassis

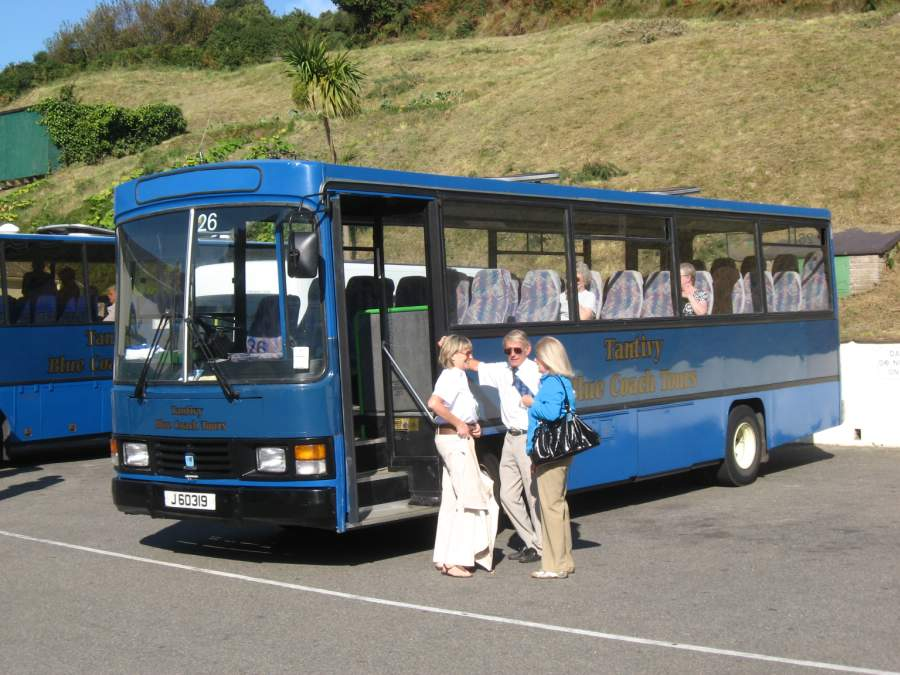
- Tantivy Blue Coach Tours Wadham Stringer bodied Swift on Jersey in September 2008

Overview
- Manufacturer: Leyland Bus
- Production: 1987-1990
- Assembly: Farington, Lancashire, England

Body and chassis
- Doors: 1
- Floor type: Step-entrance

Powertrain
- Engine: Cummins 6BT
- Capacity: Reeve Burgess Harrier; 37-41 seated, 15 standing
- Power output: 115–130 hp (86–97 kW)
- Transmission: Turner T5290 five-speed syncromesh Allison AT545 five-speed automatic

Dimensions
- Length: 3.6–4.4 m (12–14 ft)
- Width: 2.45 m (8 ft 0 in)
- Curb weight: Reeve Burgess Harrier; 5,160 kilograms (11,380 lb)

Chronology
- Predecessor: Leyland Cub
- Successor: Volvo B6

The Leyland Swift was a midibus chassis manufactured by Leyland between 1987 and 1990 as a successor to the Leyland Cub. It shared many components with the Roadrunner light truck but with the engine relocated to behind the front axle which was itself set back to permit a passenger entrance in the front overhang. Mechanically a 6-cylinder Cummins B turbo-diesel powerplant was standard with the choice of synchromesh or Allison automatic gearboxes. It was available in a choice of short wheelbase (3.6 metres (12 ft) or long wheelbase (4.4 metres (14 ft)). The first entered service in November 1987 with Harrogate Independent Travel.

A number of coachbuilders produced bodies on the Swift with Wadham Stringer enjoying healthy sales with a very tidy adaptation of its Vanguard II body. The Reeve Burgess Harrier was also popular, while Wright of Northern Ireland produced Consort and Handybus variants, and Elme 2001 of Portugal supplied a number to Orion coach specification and also to Welfare CareCoach specification with a centrally mounted underfloor wheelchair lift.

Welfare and Bus versions were also constructed by Potteries Motor Traction to the Knype outline, mainly for their own use, although a demonstrator was built. Several Swifts were built as mobile libraries. Sales declined markedly once production of the lower-floor Dennis Dart was in full swing.

The Elme Orion and Vanguard II proved particularly popular with operators on the Channel Island of Jersey and Elme on Guernsey owing to its close fit to the maximum vehicle size regulations, seating up to 43 and allowing the replacement of elderly Bedford SB coaches. Otherwise, the Swift was only a moderate success in an uncertain UK marketplace and was disadvantaged by the relatively high floor necessary to clear the mid-mounted powertrain.

After Leyland Bus was purchased by Volvo, the Swift was phased out and in some respects replaced by the rear-engined Volvo B6.
