= Leyland Cub =

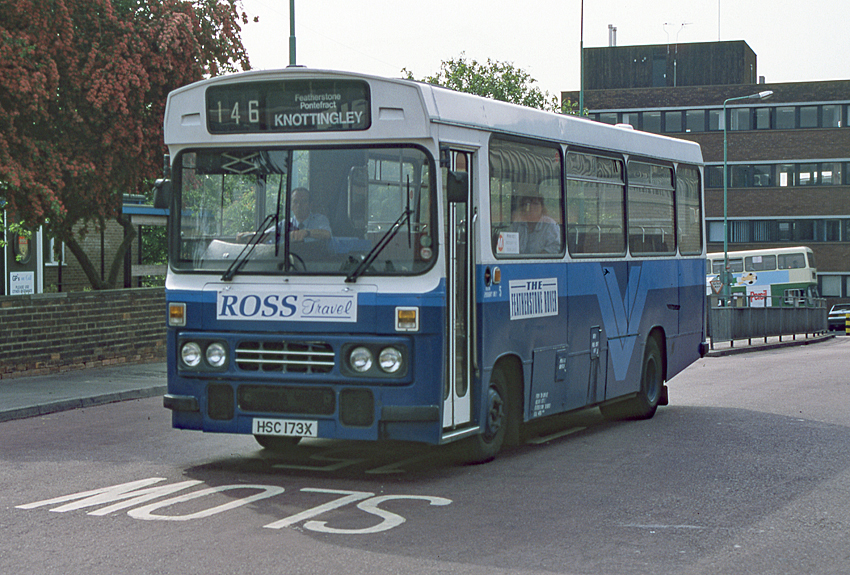
- Ross Travel, ex LRT, Leyland Cub at Pontefract, 1996

Overview
- Manufacturer: Leyland
- Production: 1979-1987

Body and chassis
- Doors: 1 door
- Floor type: Step entrance

Powertrain
- Engine: Leyland 6.98NV; Leyland 6.98DV
- Transmission: Allison 545

Dimensions
- Length: 6.7m (CU335); 7.2m (CU385); 7.7m (CU435)

Chronology
- Predecessor: Leyland Terrier
- Successor: Leyland Swift

The Leyland Cub CU series was a midibus manufactured by Leyland between 1979 and 1987. There was a previous Leyland Cub, the K series built at Leyland's Ham factory between 1931 and 1939.

The Cub was derived from the Terrier truck chassis, and was originally built at Leyland's Scottish plant in Bathgate. It was available in three variants - CU335, CU385 and CU435, the number in each indicating the wheelbase length in centimetres. It was usually fitted with Leyland's 5.7-litre 6.98NV engine, though the derated 6.98DV was also an option.

Most Cubs were built for local authorities and the welfare sector, and thus carried bodywork by Wadham Stringer of Hampshire or Reeve Burgess of Derbyshire. However, Lothian Region Transport took 18 CU435s with Duple Dominant bodies in 1981, while the West Yorkshire Passenger Transport Executive bought 15 with Optare bodies in 1986. There were also four Reeve Burgess-bodied Cubs for Southdown Motor Services in 1983/84, and two for the Greater Manchester Passenger Transport Executive in 1985, originally used for services in Wythenshawe, Manchester and were first based in Northenden (NN).

The Cub was superseded in 1987 by another truck-derived midibus, the Leyland Swift.

Surviving vehicles include one WYPTE example and one GMPTE example, as well as a number of non-PSV examples which are mostly used as campers. The preserved WYPTE vehicle appeared in an episode of Vera taking miners to a colliery in a 1980s flashback scene.
