= Plaxton Beaver =

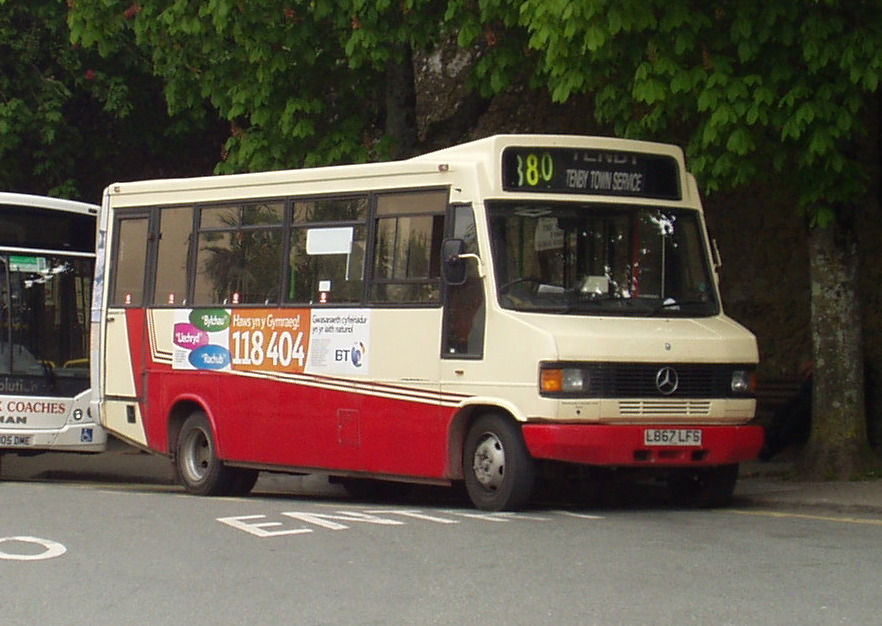
- Silcox Coaches Plaxton Beaver 1 bodied Mercedes-Benz 711D in Tenby in May 2005

Overview
- Manufacturer: Reeve Burgess; Plaxton
- Production: 1987–2011

Body and chassis
- Doors: 1 door
- Floor type: Step entrance
- Chassis: Mercedes-Benz T2; Mercedes-Benz Vario; Renault S56 and S75; Iveco 49.10

Powertrain
- Engine: Mercedes-Benz (Mercedes-Benz T2/Vario)

The Plaxton Beaver, originally known as the Reeve Burgess Beaver, is a minibus body built by Plaxton. It was built at the Pilsley, Derbyshire factory of Plaxton's Reeve Burgess subsidiary from 1987 to 1991, at Plaxton's main Scarborough factory from 1991, and from 1995 at Anston in South Yorkshire.

The Beaver has been built mainly on Mercedes-Benz van-derived minibus chassis such as the 709D and 811D, and was also built on the Renault S56 and S75 until 1992. Rare examples were also built on Iveco 49.10 chassis.

The Beaver 2, built on Mercedes-Benz Vario chassis, replaced the original Beaver in December 1996, and was still in production in 2007. In 2006, Plaxton launched the Beaver 3, which was the Beaver 2 body combined with the front end of a Plaxton Cheetah.

== Gallery ==
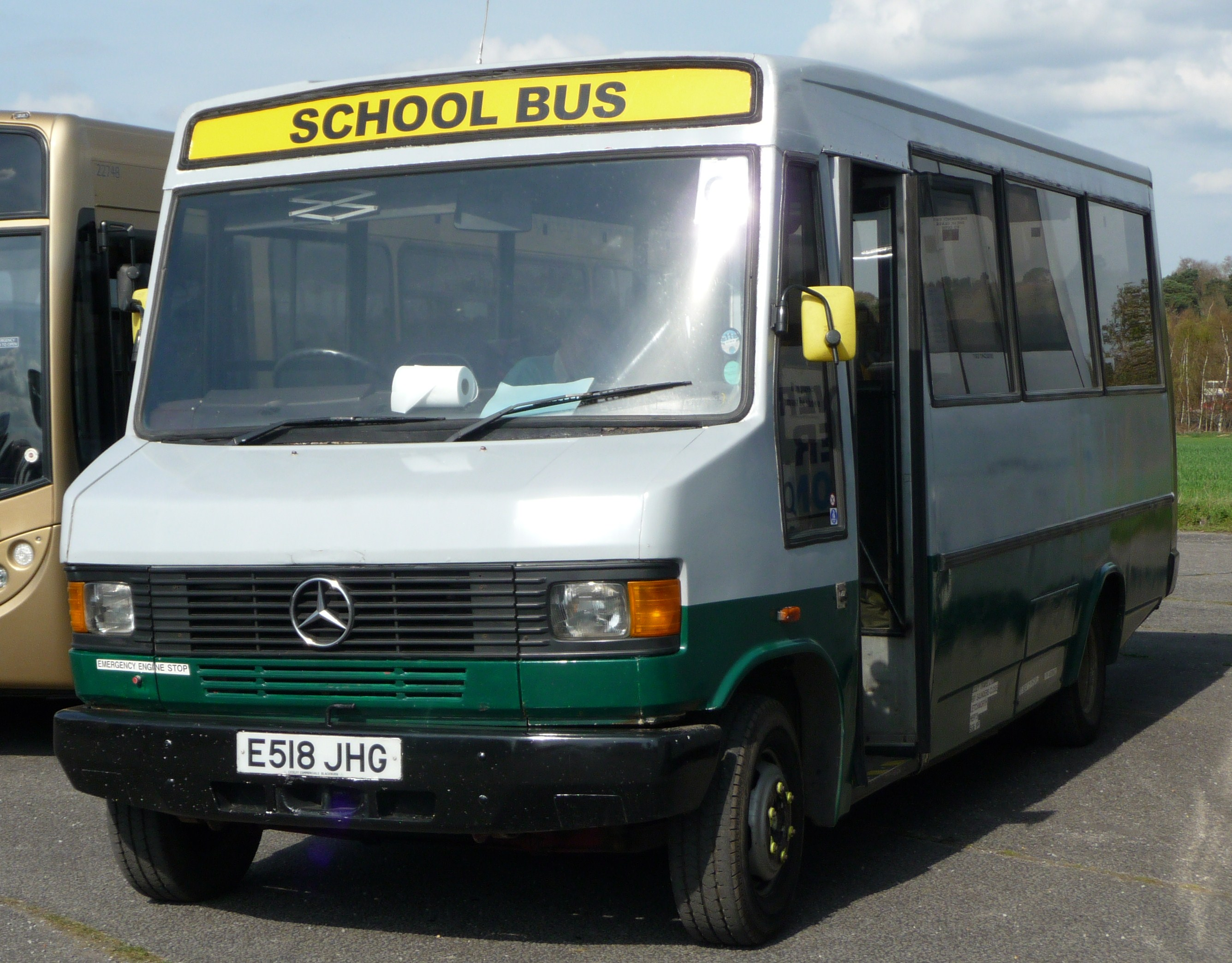
Reeve Burgess Beaver bodied Mercedes-Benz 709D in 2009

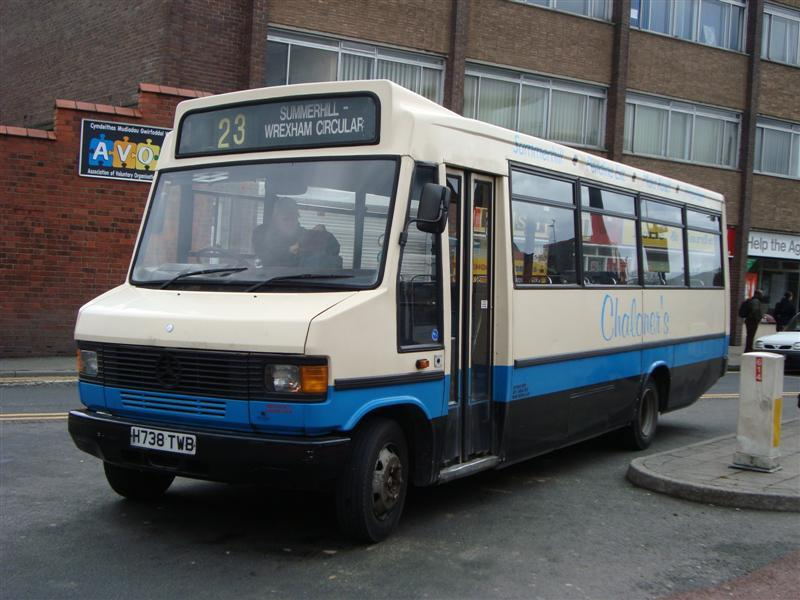
Chaloner's Plaxton Beaver 1 bodied Mercedes-Benz O811 in 2009

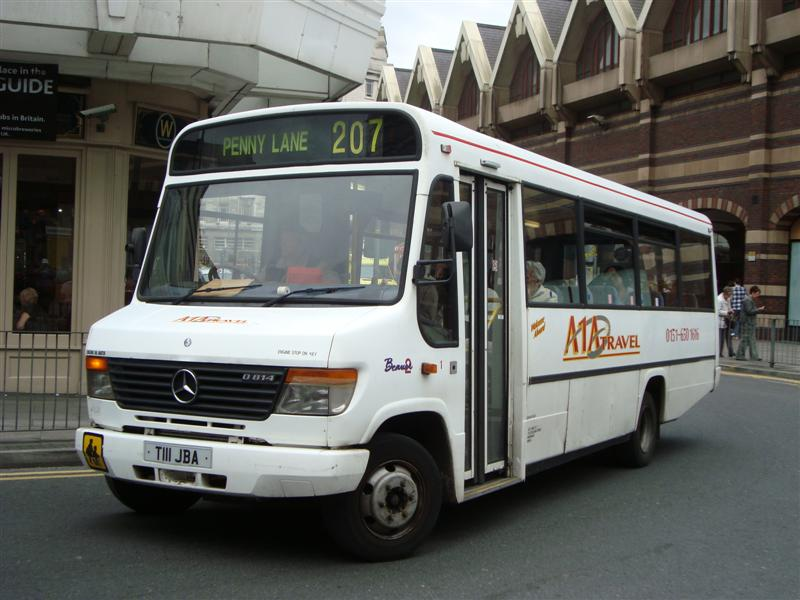
Plaxton Beaver 2 bodied Mercedes-Benz O814 Vario in 2008

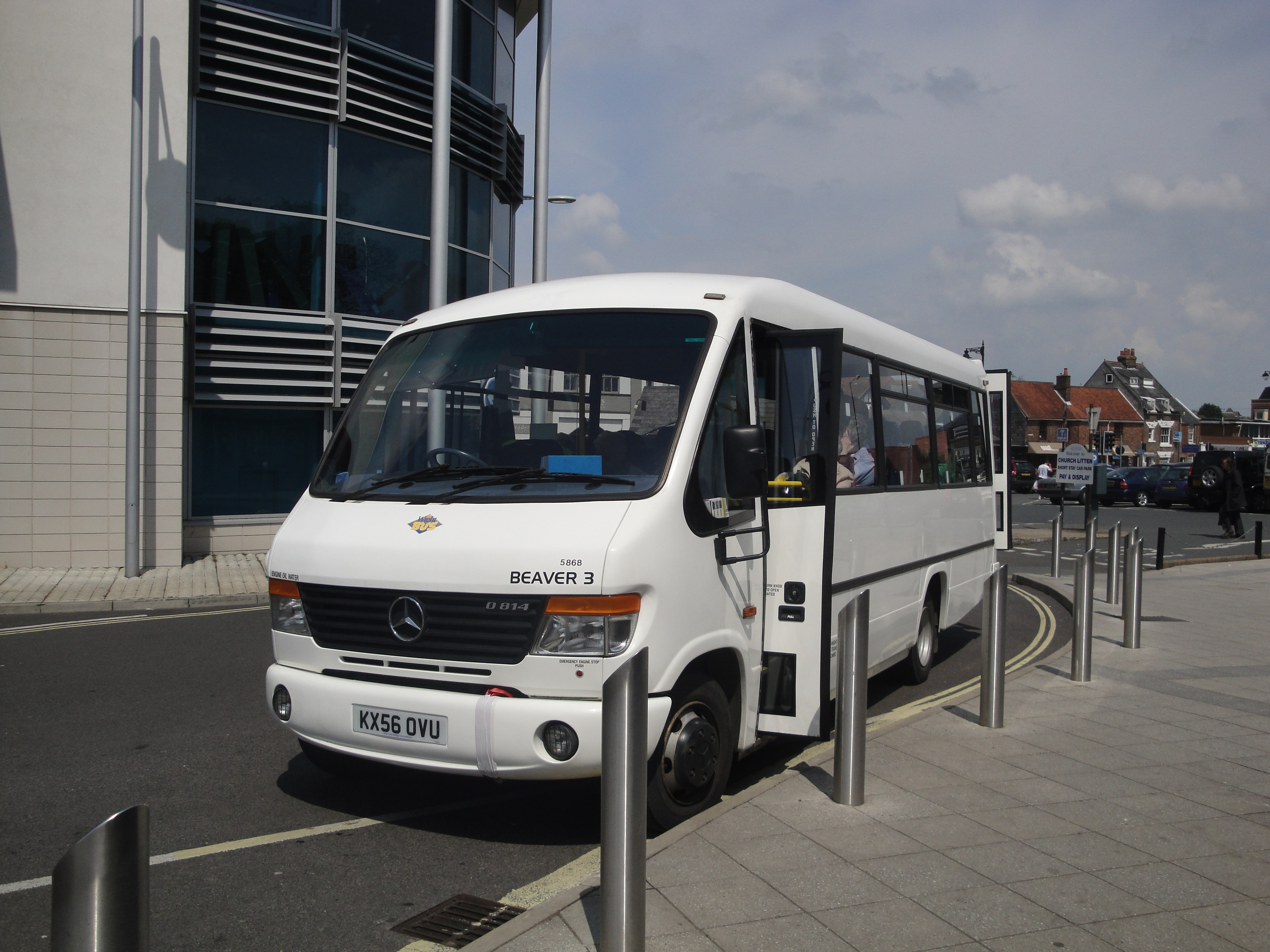
Wightbus Plaxton Beaver 3 bodied Mercedes-Benz O814D Vario in 2010

== See also ==
- List of buses
