= Arriva North West and Wales =

British bus operating company

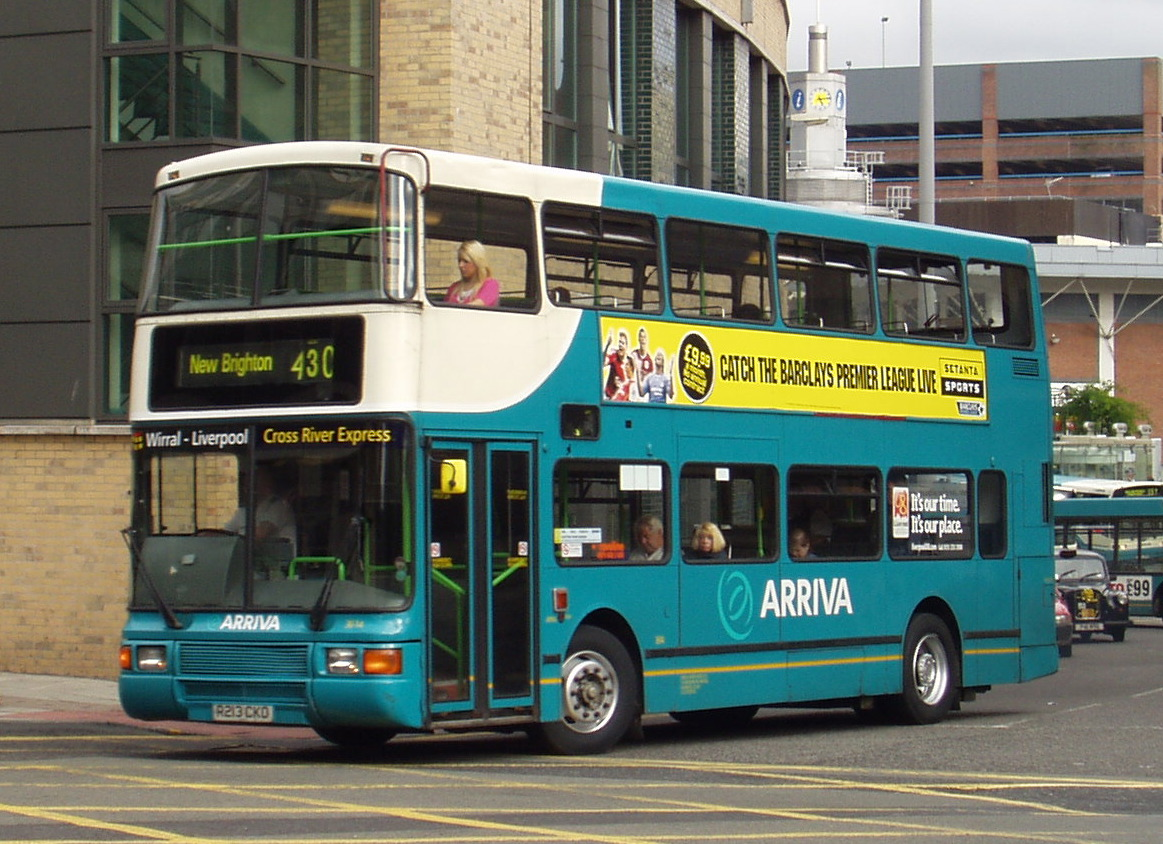
- Northern Counties Palatine II bodied DAF DB250
- Parent: Arriva
- Founded: 2002
- Defunct: 2009
- Headquarters: Aintree
- Locale: North West
- Service area: Merseyside, Cheshire, Greater Manchester, Lancashire, North Wales
- Service type: Bus
- Website: Arriva Bus website

Arriva North West and Wales was a division of Arriva that operated bus services around North West England and Wales. It was made up from several previous bus operators, including North Western (in Merseyside, Cheshire and Lancashire), most of MTL North (formerly Merseybus), the Bee Line Buzz Company (in Greater Manchester), and most of what was once Crosville Motor Services (in Cheshire and Wales).

In January 2009, the Welsh depots were separated into a new division named Arriva Buses Wales, with the remainder of the division reverting to its previous title of Arriva North West.

== History ==
From Autumn 1997, Cowie Group was renamed Arriva and like Stagecoach and FirstGroup a consistent corporate image was introduced for its many and different bus operations. Outside of London this was a corporate livery of aquamarine with a Cotswold stone (cream) swoop, Arriva branding and a strap-line of the region the bus was operating in. For the former North Western operation this strap-line was serving the North West. In Spring 1998, Arriva decided to give an Arriva identity to the many companies which comprised Arriva Passenger Services and as a consequence North Western Road Car Co. Ltd became Arriva North West Ltd with the associated Bee Line and Liverline operations becoming Arriva Manchester Ltd and Arriva Merseyside Ltd respectively.

Apart from the adoption of the Arriva corporate identity, not too much was different between Arriva North West and North Western as the 1990s drew to a close. In late Summer 1998, Arriva North West (rather than GMPTE) became responsible for the management of the bus station at the new Trafford Centre shopping mall. In 1999, Arriva North West made its first major acquisition of Winsford based Nova Scotia Travel which allowed it to strengthen its operations from its Winsford depot considerably in and around the former Vale Royal borough of Cheshire. However, the Nova Scotia acquisition would soon prove a minor event for Arriva North West's future development which significantly changed as a consequence of the impending bankruptcy and sale of Merseyside's largest bus operator MTL Trust Holdings.

== Acquisition of MTL Trust Holdings Ltd ==
On 18 February 2000, Arriva plc acquired Merseyside's largest bus operator MTL Trust Holdings Ltd. The former Merseybus operation and the many companies which were acquired or created by MTL were amalgamated by Arriva North West into a 'new' Arriva Merseyside Ltd with the former Arriva Merseyside Ltd (Liverline) becoming Arriva Liverpool Ltd. As a consequence of Arriva's acquisition of MTL, the management of the Arriva North West depot at Winsford was transferred to Arriva Midlands North.

Arriva's acquisition of MTL significantly increased its presence within Merseyside's bus market with the effect that Aintree based CMT Buses remained its only meaningful competitor. This concerned the Competition Commission who ordered Arriva North West to sell one of its depots in order to avoid a public inquiry over its purchase of MTL. Gillmoss depot in north Liverpool was the depot chosen to be sold, although its sale became a rather protracted affair. In early 2001 the Go-Ahead Group seemed ready to purchase Gillmoss, considering it to have similar characteristics to its Go North East operation. However, at the 11th hour, this deal broke down and instead Go Ahead acquired Arriva Croydon & North Surrey Ltd merging it into its established Metrobus operation. Arriva North West put a proposal to the Competition Commission for substantial investment in Gillmoss if the Commission withdrew its stipulation that Arriva had to sell the depot. However the Competition Commission did not accept this proposal and a buyer for Gillmoss had to be found.

Gillmoss was eventually purchased on 15 July 2001 by two former MTL managers - Dominic Brady and Ian Campbell who formed Glenvale Transport (GT). Furthermore, the Competition Commission stipulated Arriva North West couldn't compete with GT's core service network in North Liverpool and Kirkby for three years. GT began expanding its service network against Arriva North West and in June 2003 acquired CMT Buses, further strengthening its position in Liverpool, in particular. By 2004 the Competition Commission ban against Arriva North West competing with GT was over and gradually copycat services were introduced on most of GT's routes. GT, £7 million in debt and with an aging bus fleet, was taken over on 11 July 2005 by the Stagecoach Group who renamed it Stagecoach Merseyside.

Relations between Arriva and Stagecoach on Merseyside seem reasonably cordial and from 2005 both operators gradually withdrew most of the competing services against each other leaving Stagecoach to become the main operator in North Liverpool and Kirkby and Arriva North West & Wales the dominant operator in most of the rest of Merseyside.

== Further developments and acquisitions ==
Arriva North West became responsible for the management of Arriva Cymru Ltd from 25 February 2002, and to reflect this, the name for this division of Arriva became Arriva North West & Wales. Arriva North West and Wales expanded further when the Crewe, Macclesfield and Winsford depots of Arriva Midlands North Ltd were transferred to it on 1 February 2003 and this has enabled Arriva North West and Wales to assume control of much of what was Crosville Motor Services with the exception of the Rock Ferry - Birkenhead, Chester and Ellesmere Port (now closed) depots which are part of First Chester & The Wirral.

Arriva North West has also pursued acquisitions and on 2 August 2004 Liverpool based independent Merseyline Travel of Garston was acquired, perhaps to strengthen Arriva Merseyside's competitive moves against GT before it was acquired by Stagecoach. In Greater Manchester it acquired one of the major independent operators in that region Blue Bus of Bolton enabling a good strategic fit with the Arriva Manchester operation and expansion into Bolton, Salford and Wigan.

Some of the operations of KMP of Llanberis were acquired by Arriva in August 2008 and merged with Arriva Cymru. This removed competition along the route between Llandudno and Bangor. The rest of KMP was acquired by independent Padarn Bus in April 2009.

From 1 January 2009, the Wales operations were split from Arriva North West and became Arriva Buses Wales with a separate Managing Director.

From 23 July 2011, Skelmersdale Depot was closed down, losing 19 jobs. All services (apart from service 313 Skem-Wigan) transferred to the other depots.
