= Bolton bus station =

Bus station in the town of Bolton, in Greater Manchester. England

Bolton Interchange
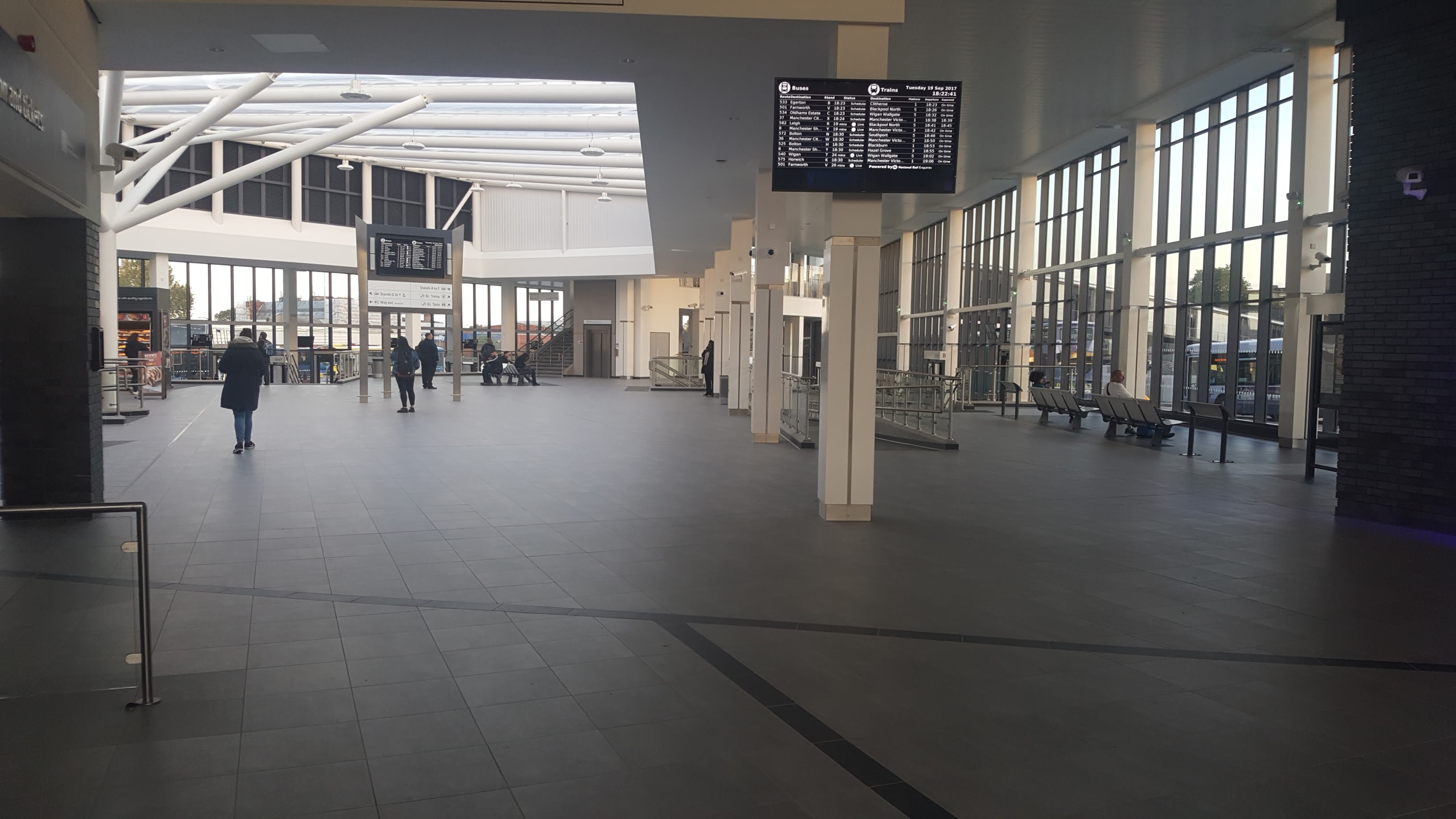
- The current station, situated on Newport Street.

General information
- Location: Newport Street; Bolton
- Coordinates: 53.575856°N 2.427611°W
- Operator: Bee Network
- Bus operators: Go North West; Blackburn Bus Company; Diamond Bus North West; Stagecoach in Lancashire

Construction
- Parking: No
- Cycle facilities: Yes
- Accessible: Yes

History
- Opened: 3 September 2017
Location

Bolton Interchange is a bus station in the town of Bolton, in Greater Manchester. It is run by Transport for Greater Manchester.

== Background ==
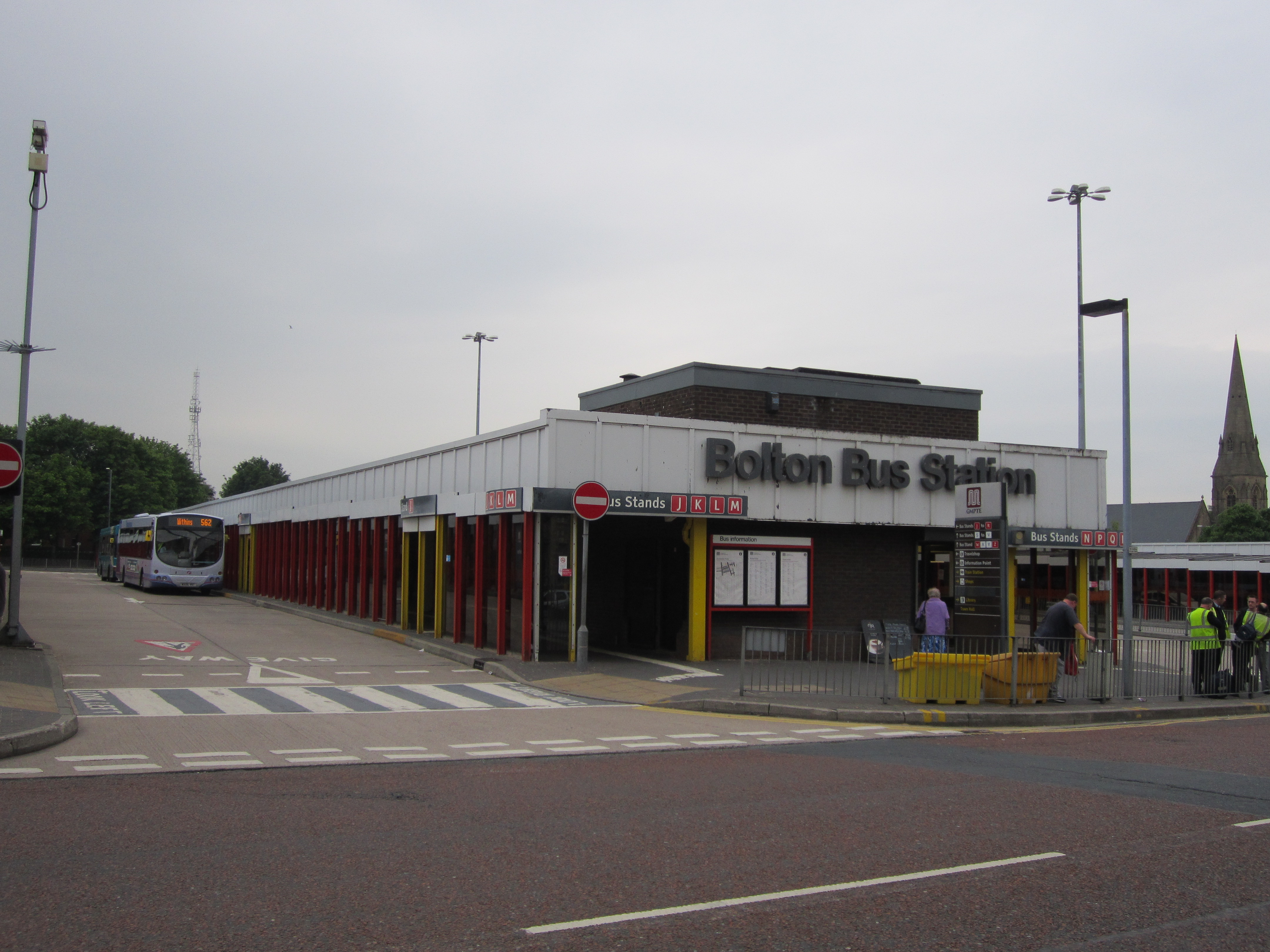
The old bus station, situated on Moor Lane

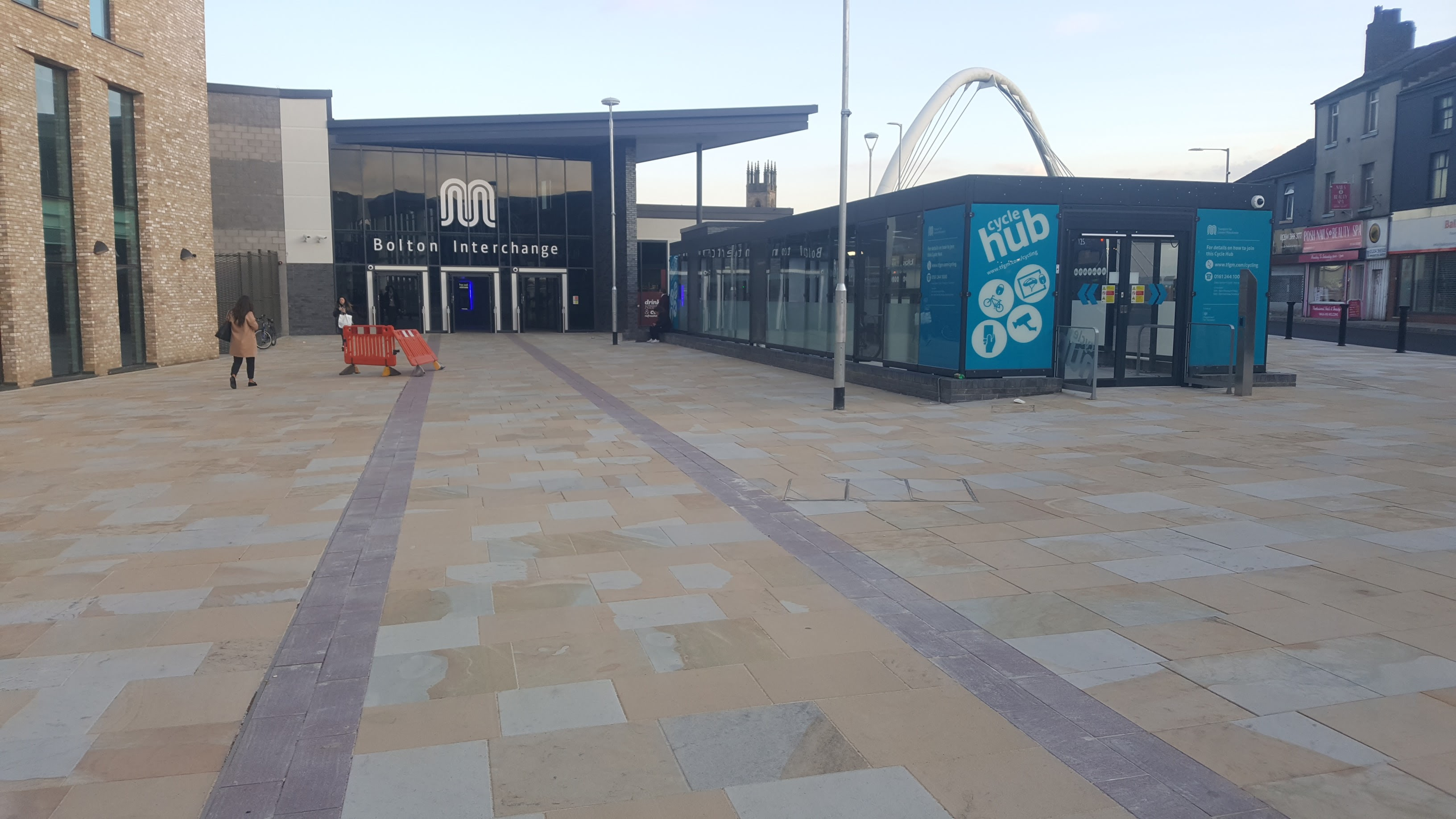
The entrance to the current station

In January 2010, Transport for Greater Manchester (then the GMPTE) started a public consultation about the development of a bus station on Newport Street, replacing the bus station on Moor Lane and the small bus interchange at the railway station.

Plans for the bus station, designed by architects Aedas were submitted to Bolton Metropolitan Borough Council in April 2010 and were approved in June 2010. The plans were amended and a second consultation took place between October and December 2010. Approval for construction was granted in March 2012. The new station opened on 3 September 2017.

== Services ==
The majority of services that serve Bolton bus station are run by the Bee Network. Operators include Go North West, Diamond North West, Blackburn Bus Company, Stagecoach in Lancashire.

There are frequent buses running to Bury, Chorley, Leigh, Manchester Piccadilly, Manchester Shudehill, Preston, Radcliffe, Rochdale and Wigan, plus several parts of the Bolton area, such as Breightmet, Deane, Harwood, Farnworth, Great Lever, Smithills and Horwich. Buses also run to Blackburn, Darwen, Rawtenstall and the Trafford Centre.
