= Blue Bus and Coach Services =

British bus operating company

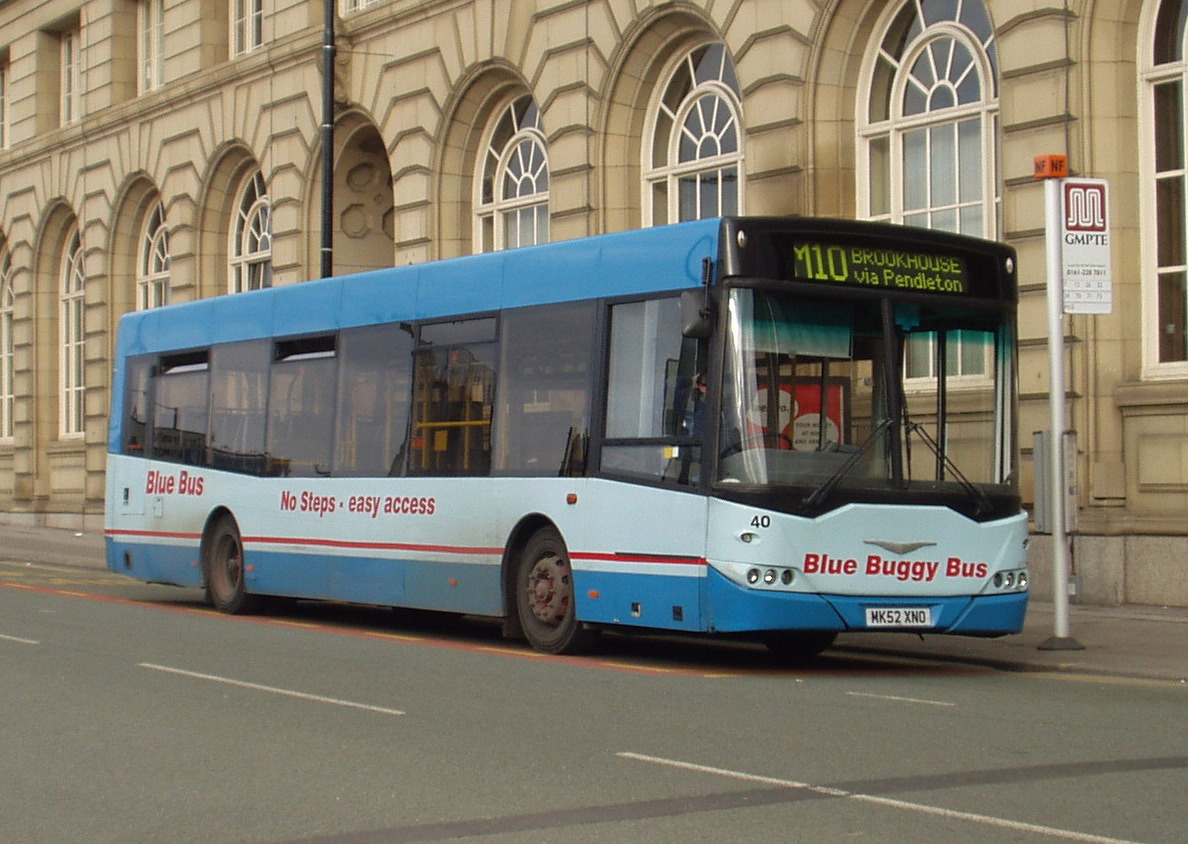
- Ikarus Polaris 489 bodied DAF SB220 in Manchester
- Parent: Roger Jarvis; Alan Turner
- Founded: May 1991
- Ceased operation: July 2005
- Headquarters: Bolton
- Service area: Greater Manchester; Lancashire; Merseyside; West Yorkshire

Blue Bus was a large independent bus company serving Greater Manchester, Lancashire and Merseyside.

== History ==
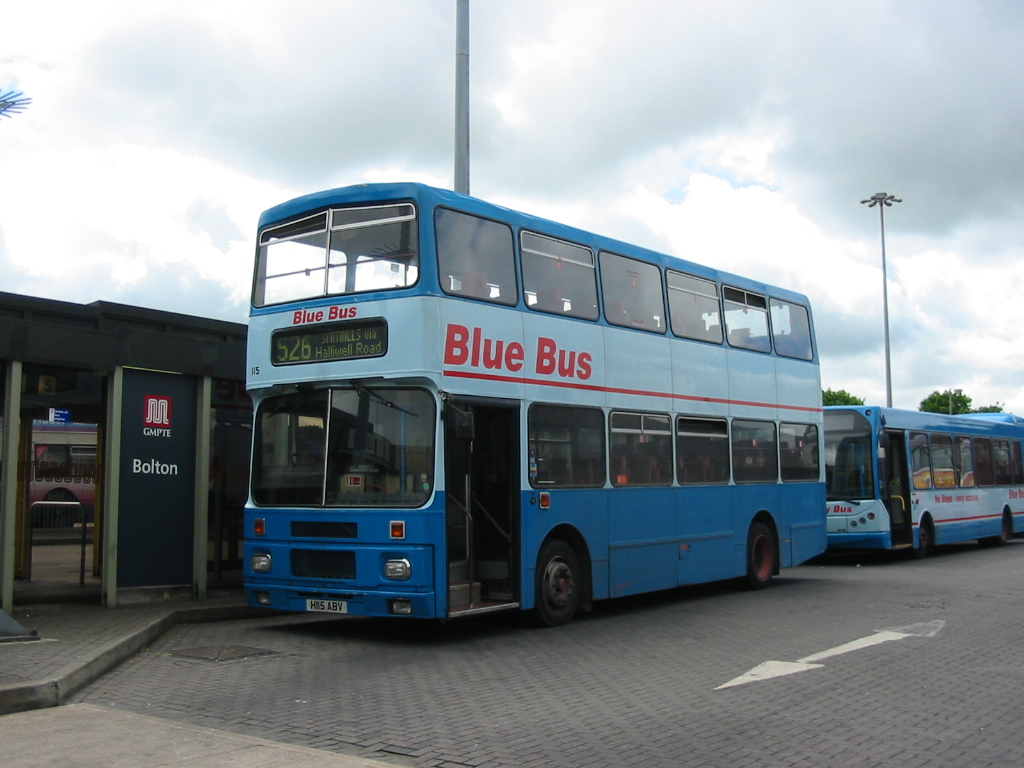
Alexander bodied Volvo Citybus at Bolton bus station in May 2004

Blue Bus was formed in 1991 by former Shearings managers Roger Jarvis and Alan Turner. It was based at a former railway works in Horwich, six miles to the west of Bolton. The first type of bus to be acquired in bulk was the Leyland Leopard, which were followed by a number of Leyland Atlanteans.

It commenced operating its first route in May 1991 between Bolton and Horwich via Chorley New Road in competition with GM Buses. Each of the five services introduced to give this combined frequency served a different estate in Horwich. A 20-minute service along Chorley Old Road from Bolton to the Johnson Fold estate was next to be introduced, followed by a series of routes in Wigan. The first of these ran to Shevington. It was decided to open an outpost at Appley Bridge to act as a local base for the Wigan routes.

New routes were added to the network following contract wins, and a number of commercial routes were also introduced, taking the company into new areas such as Manchester. In addition, the company gained work from a holiday company, Alfa Tours. Five coaches were acquired for this, with two were specially branded for Alfa.

Blue Bus purchased a depot in Huddersfield in August 1994, launching a service to Marsden in competition with Yorkshire Rider. This venture was later expanded into Bradford. Rider was taken over by FirstBus in 1996, and Blue Bus' West Yorkshire operation ceased. Just weeks later, FirstBus took over Blue Bus's main Bolton rival, GM Buses North.

During 2001, after Stagecoach sold the East Lancashire end of Ribble Motor Services company to Blazefield, Blue Bus started intensive competition against newly formed Lancashire United in the Bolton area. Blue Bus took over operation of the Bolton end of Lancashire United in August 2002, acquiring the former Ribble depot, staff, services and several vehicles. The head office was moved to the former Lancashire United office at Bolton bus station, and the Horwich base was later closed down, with most buses moving to Bolton. This acquisition saw rivalry develop between Blue Bus and FirstBus, with Blue Bus moving onto the 400 TransLancs Express service and introducing an X9 express service into Manchester. Both companies eventually withdrew and the services were withdrawn.

In early 2005, Blue Bus sold its Appley Bridge depot to South Lancs Travel along with six buses and all of the depot's routes. This allowed the company to focus on its depots in Bolton and Eccles, with a proposal to expand further having gained tenders in Salford and Manchester on eight routes.

On 31 July 2005, Blue Bus was acquired by Arriva North West & Wales.
