= Mercedes-Benz Vario =

Full-size commercial heavy van and bus

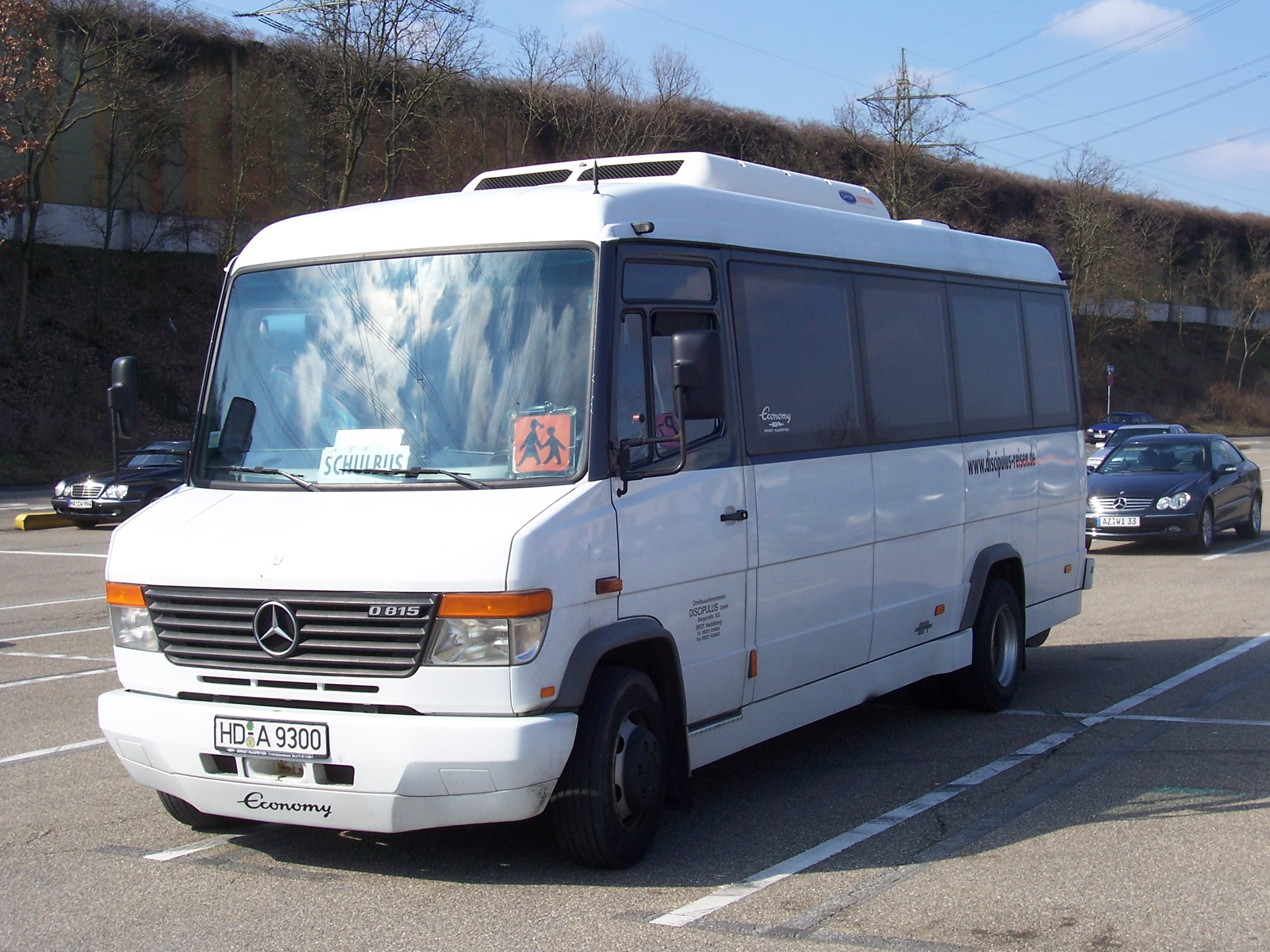
- 815D Vario minibus in Viernheim, Germany in March 2006

Overview
- Manufacturer: Daimler-Benz (1996–1998); DaimlerChrysler (1998–2007); Daimler AG (2007–2013)
- Production: 1996–2013
- Assembly: Germany: Ludwigsfelde; Spain: Alcobendas (CKD)

Body and chassis
- Class: Commercial vehicle
- Body style: 2-door truck 4-door truck 3-door van 4-door van 4-door minibus
- Layout: Front engine, rear-wheel drive Front engine, four-wheel drive

Powertrain
- Engine: Mercedes-Benz OM602; Mercedes-Benz OM904
- Transmission: 5-speed manual 6-speed manual 4-speed automatic 5-speed automatic

Dimensions
- Wheelbase: 3150-4800 mm
- Width: 2200 mm

Chronology
- Predecessor: Mercedes-Benz T2
- Successor: Mercedes-Benz Sprinter; Mercedes-Benz Atego

The Mercedes-Benz Vario (model designation BM667/668/670) is a full-size commercial heavy van and medium duty truck manufactured by Mercedes-Benz between 1996 and 2013.

== History ==
The Vario was launched in 1996 as a facelifted version of the Mercedes-Benz T2.

The bodyshell remained relatively unchanged throughout its 17-year production life. The Vario proved a popular base chassis for trucks, minibuses and mini-coaches. When new regulations required disabled access, a model with a wheelchair lift was made available.

The Vario was fitted with several types of Mercedes-Benz engines. Pre-2000 vehicles used a 5-cylinder OM602LA (2874 cm^{3}) and 4-cylinder OM904LA (4250 cm^{3}), turbocharged and intercooled diesel engine. From September 2000, Vario 618D/818D models were equipped with a 4.2-liter turbo diesel engine with intercooler and direct injection with an output of 136 or 150 hp and torque of 520 or 580 Nm, respectively. The most powerful was a 177 hp, 675Nm engine.

With the introduction of the Euro 4 emission standards, the Vario began to be equipped with OM904LA series BlueTec4 turbocharged and intercooled engine with working volume of 4250 cm^{3} and a power of 129, 156 or 177 hp. Set of new manual gearboxes, new automatic gearbox and some optional equipment was added to portfolio.

Two types of gearboxes were available, a 5-speed manual (later 6-speed) and on buses, an Allison AT 545 4-speed automatic (later an Allison LCT 1000 5-speed). Maximum payload was 4.4 tons with a load volume of 17.4 cubic meters. A 4x4 model was also available. All models had a suspension on parabolic leaf springs, all ventilated disc brakes and power steering.

On 27 September 2013, the last Vario rolled off the production line in Ludwigsfelde. Between 1996 and 2013, 90,743 units were manufactured. The Vario was succeeded in Daimler Trucks' model range by heavier versions of the Mercedes-Benz Sprinter and lighter versions of the Mercedes-Benz Atego.

== Engines ==
Model	Displacement cc	Bore × stroke mm	Engine code Mercedes-Benz	Rated output kW (hp) at rpm emission standards	Torque Nm at rpm	Prod. years	Fuel mixture
5-cylinder In-line diesel engine (turbocharged and intercooled)
512D, 612D, 812D	2874	ø89 × 92.4	OM 602 DE LA	90 (122); 3800; Euro-2	280; 2000-2300	1996–2001	Distributor injection pump with EDC - line - nozzle holder
4-cylinder In-line diesel engine (turbocharged and intercooled)
810DT	4249	ø102 × 130	OM 904 LA	75 (102); 2200; Euro-2		1996–2001	Unit pump - line - nozzle (UPS/PLD)
BlueTec4/5; 613D, 813D; 813DA (4×4)	4249	ø102 × 130	OM 904 LA	95 (129); 2200; Euro-4/Euro-5	500; 1200–1600	2006-2013	Unit pump - line - nozzle (UPS/PLD)
614D, 814D; 814DA (4×4)	4249	ø102 × 130	OM 904 LA	100 (136); 2200; Euro-2/Euro-3	520; 1200–1600	1996–2006	Unit pump - line - nozzle (UPS/PLD)
615D, 815D; 815DA (4x4)	4249	ø102 × 130	OM 904 LA	112 (152); 2200; Euro-2	580; 1200–1600	1998–2001	Unit pump - line - nozzle (UPS/PLD)
615D, 815D; 815DA (4x4)	4249	ø102 × 130	OM 904 LA	110 (150); 2200; Euro-3	575; 1200–1600	2001–2006	Unit pump - line - nozzle (UPS/PLD)
BlueTec4/5; 616D, 816D; 816DA (4x4)	4249	ø102 × 130	OM 904 LA	115 (156); 2200; Euro-4/Euro-5	610; 1200–1600	2009-2013	Unit pump - line - nozzle (UPS/PLD)
618D, 818D; BlueTec4/5 (2006-2013); 618D, 818D; 818DA (4x4)	4249	ø102 × 130	OM 904 LA	130 (177); 2200; Euro-3; Euro-4/Euro-5	675; 1200–1600	2003–2013	Unit pump - line - nozzle (UPS/PLD)

== Gallery ==
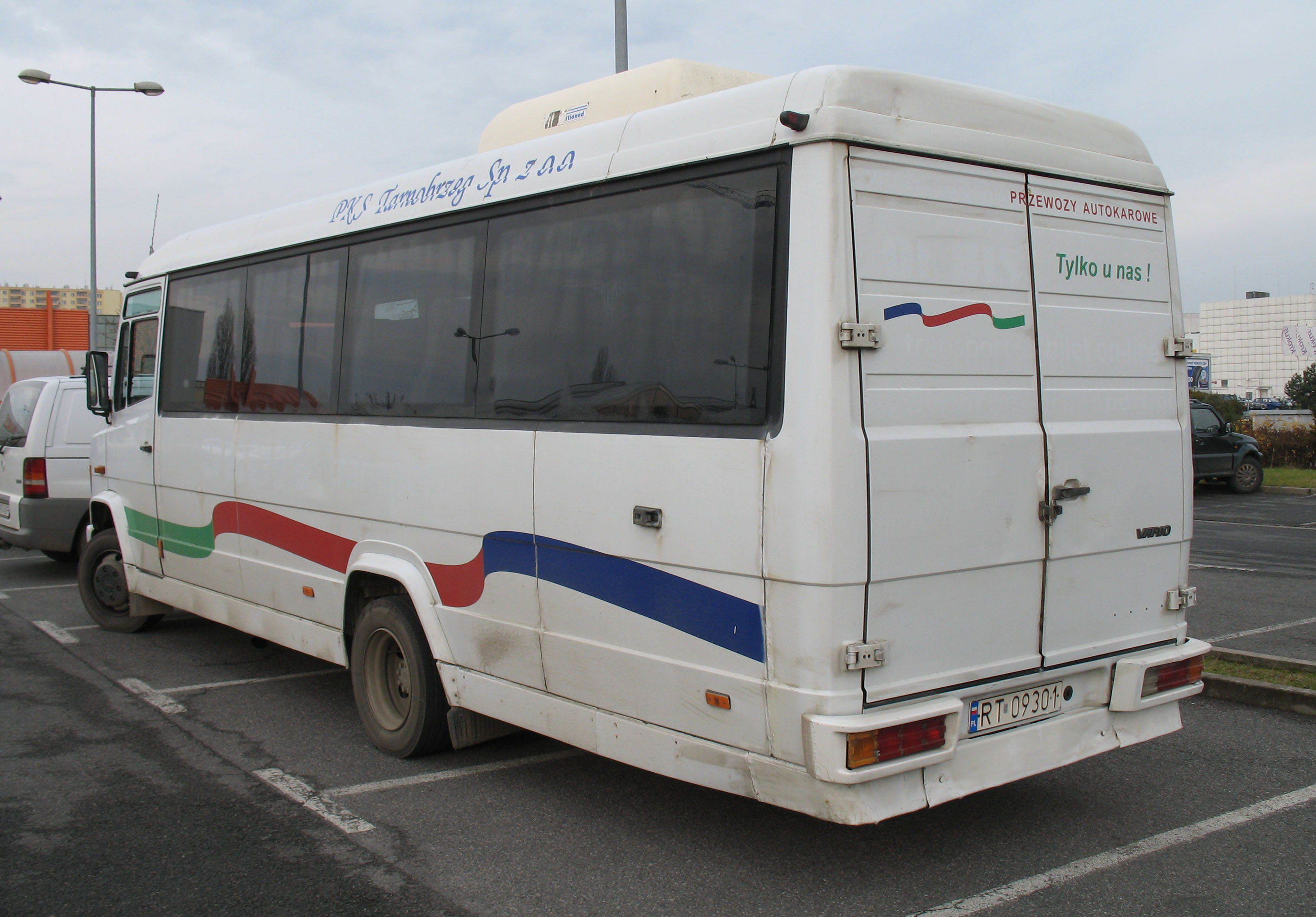
O814D Vario minibus rear in Kraków, Poland in November 2010

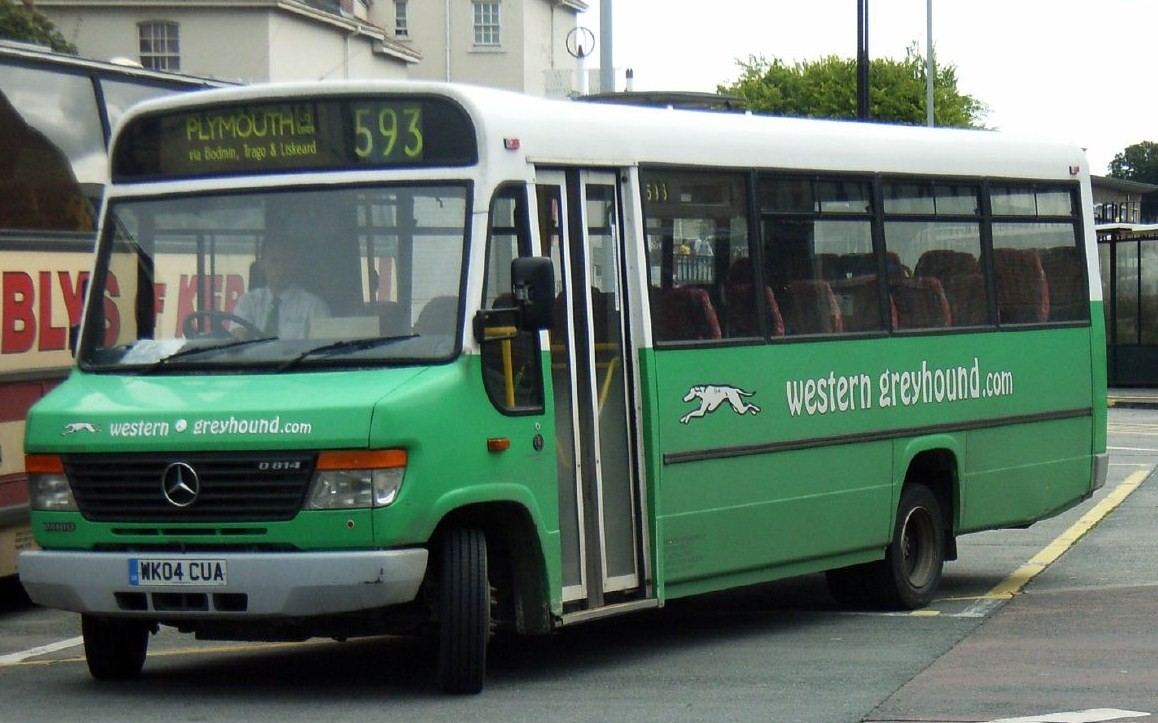
Western Greyhound Plaxton Beaver 2 bodied O814 in Plymouth in September 2006

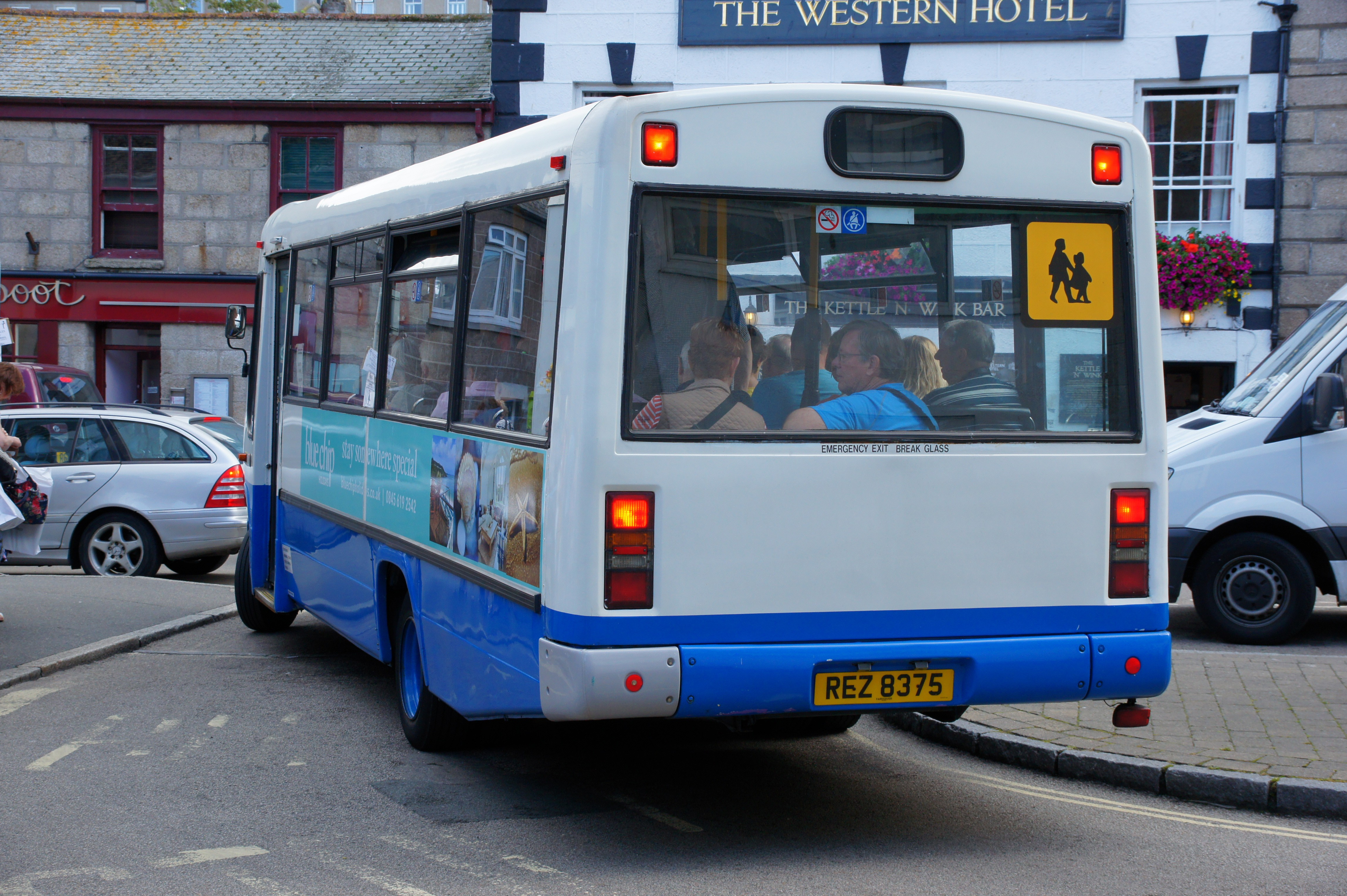
St Ives Bus Company Plaxton Beaver 2 bodied O814 in Cornwall in July 2013

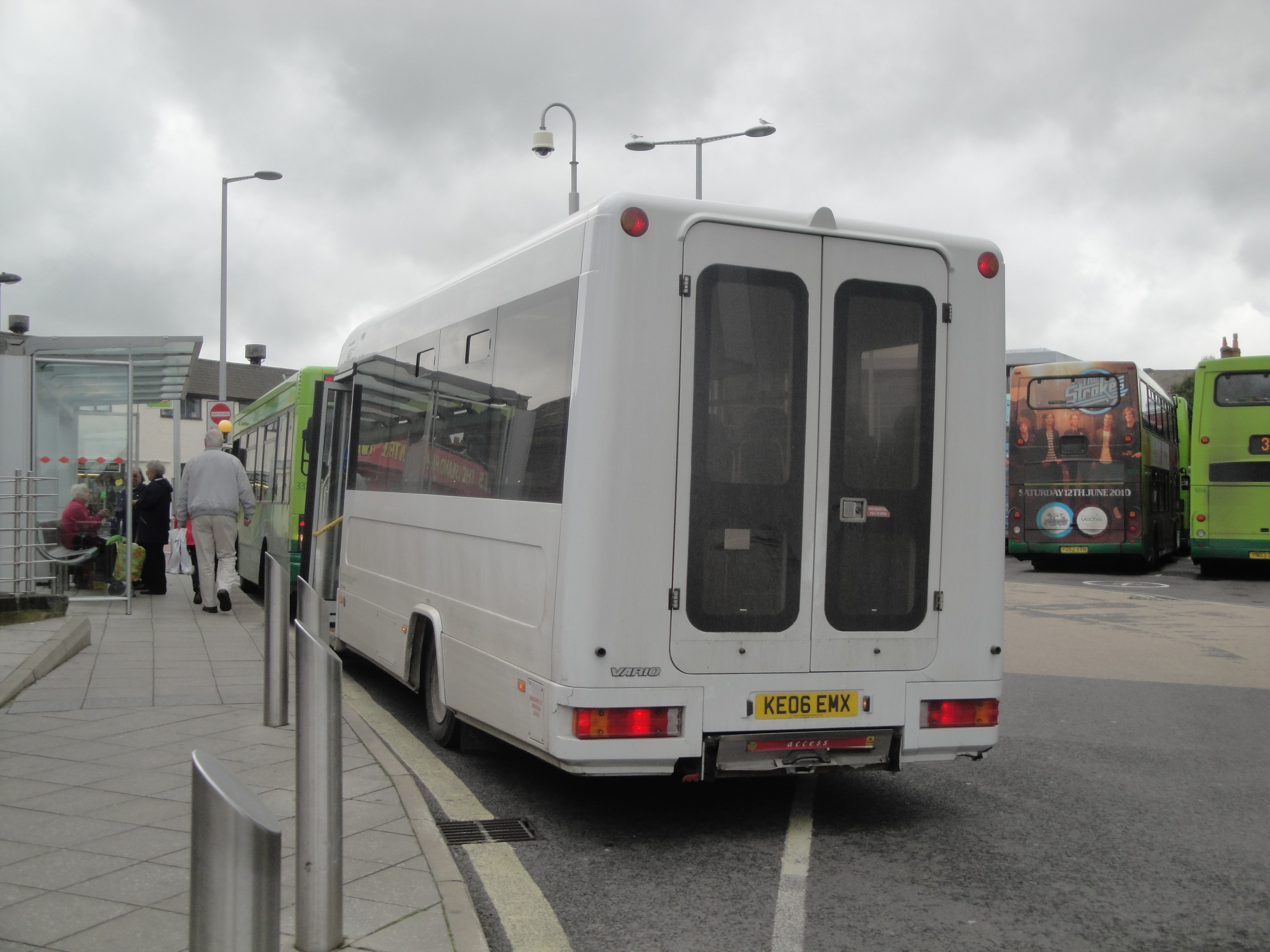
Southern Vectis O814D Vario minibus with rear wheelchair access in the UK in November 2011

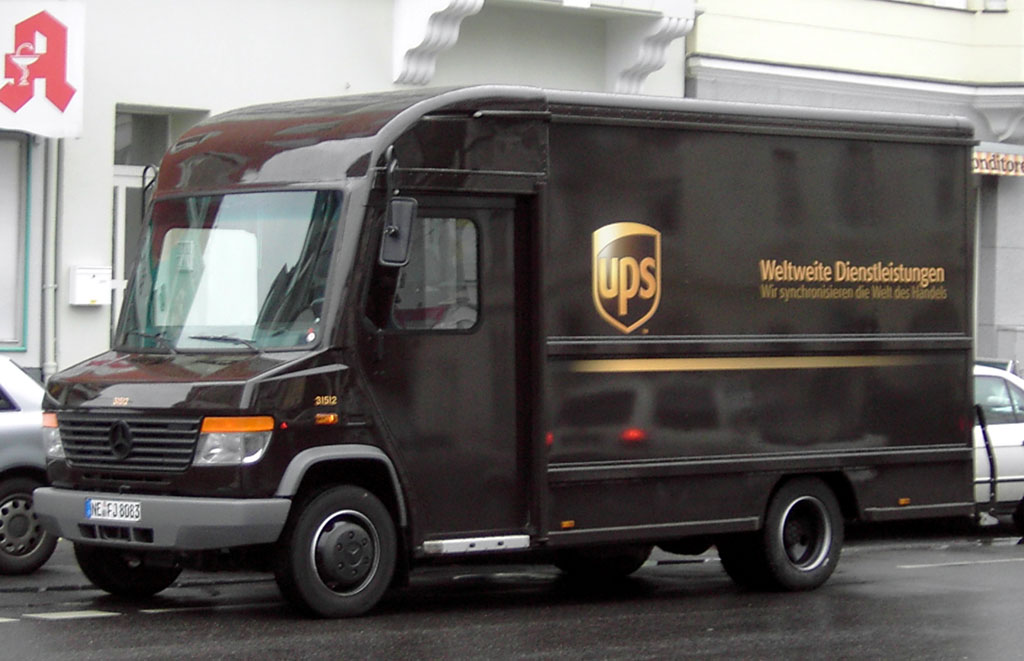
UPS Vario van in Germany in May 2005

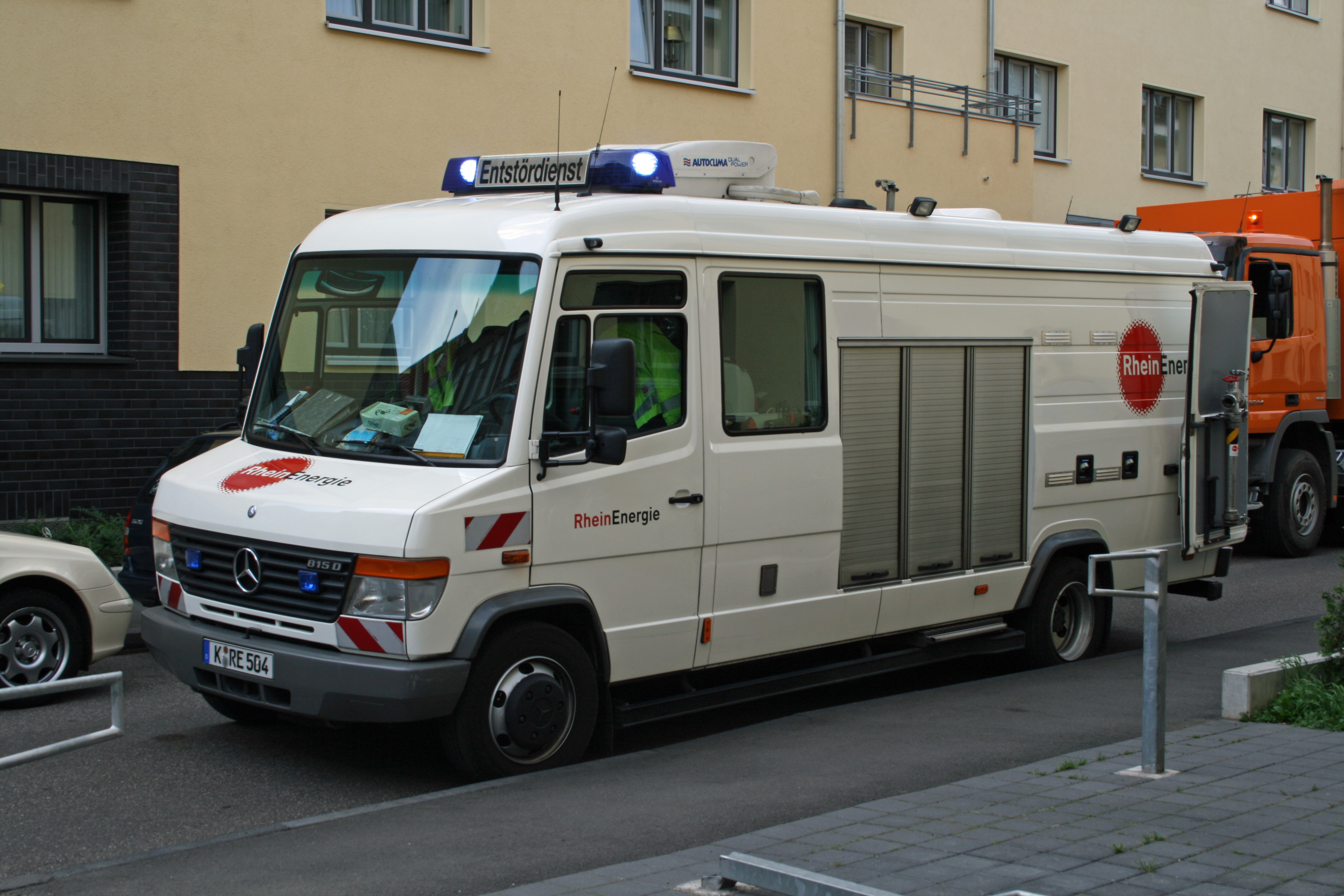
RheinEnergie 815D Vario Emergency Service Van in Cologne in July 2007

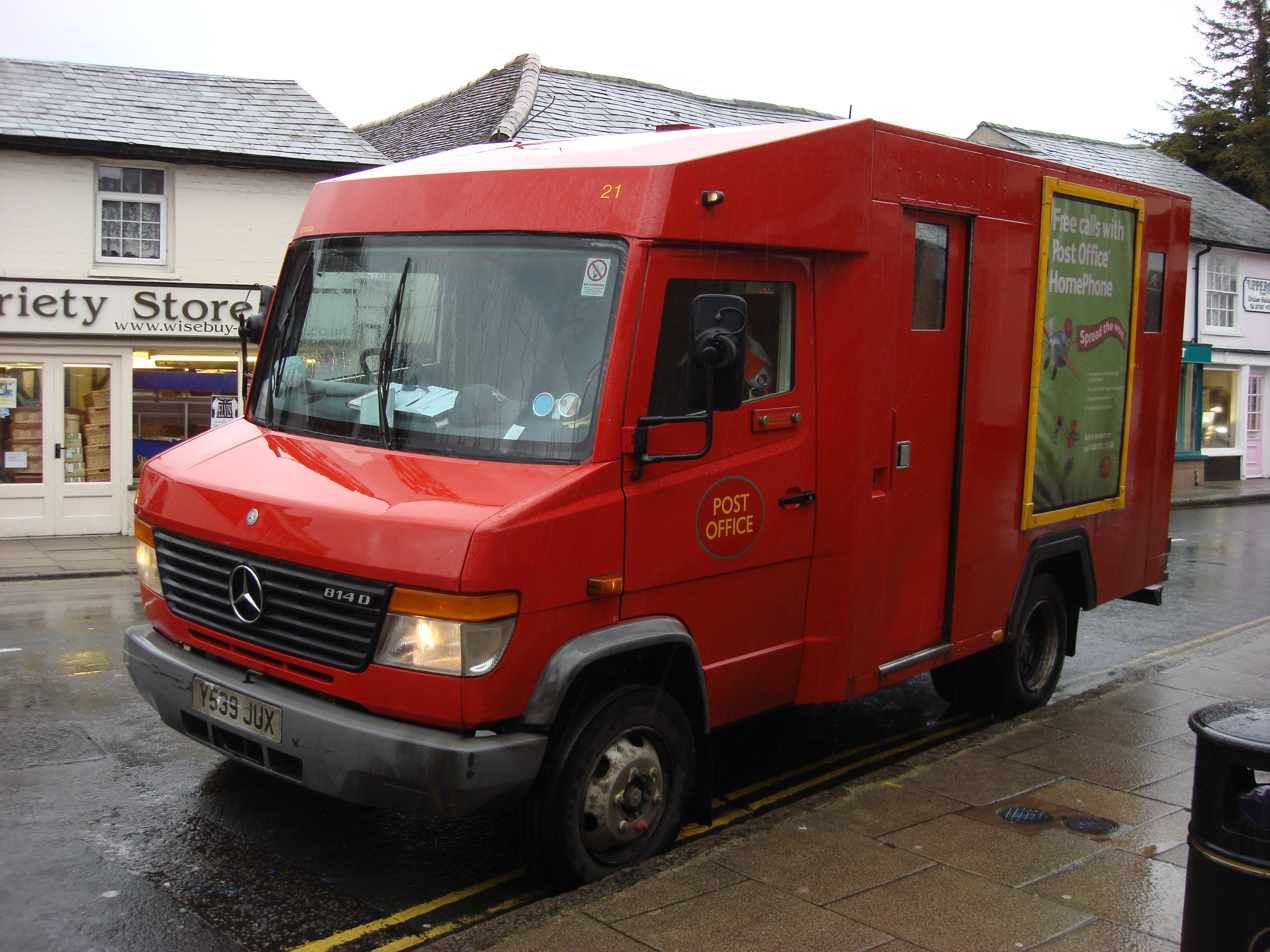
814D Vario Post Office Van in Halstead in January 2008

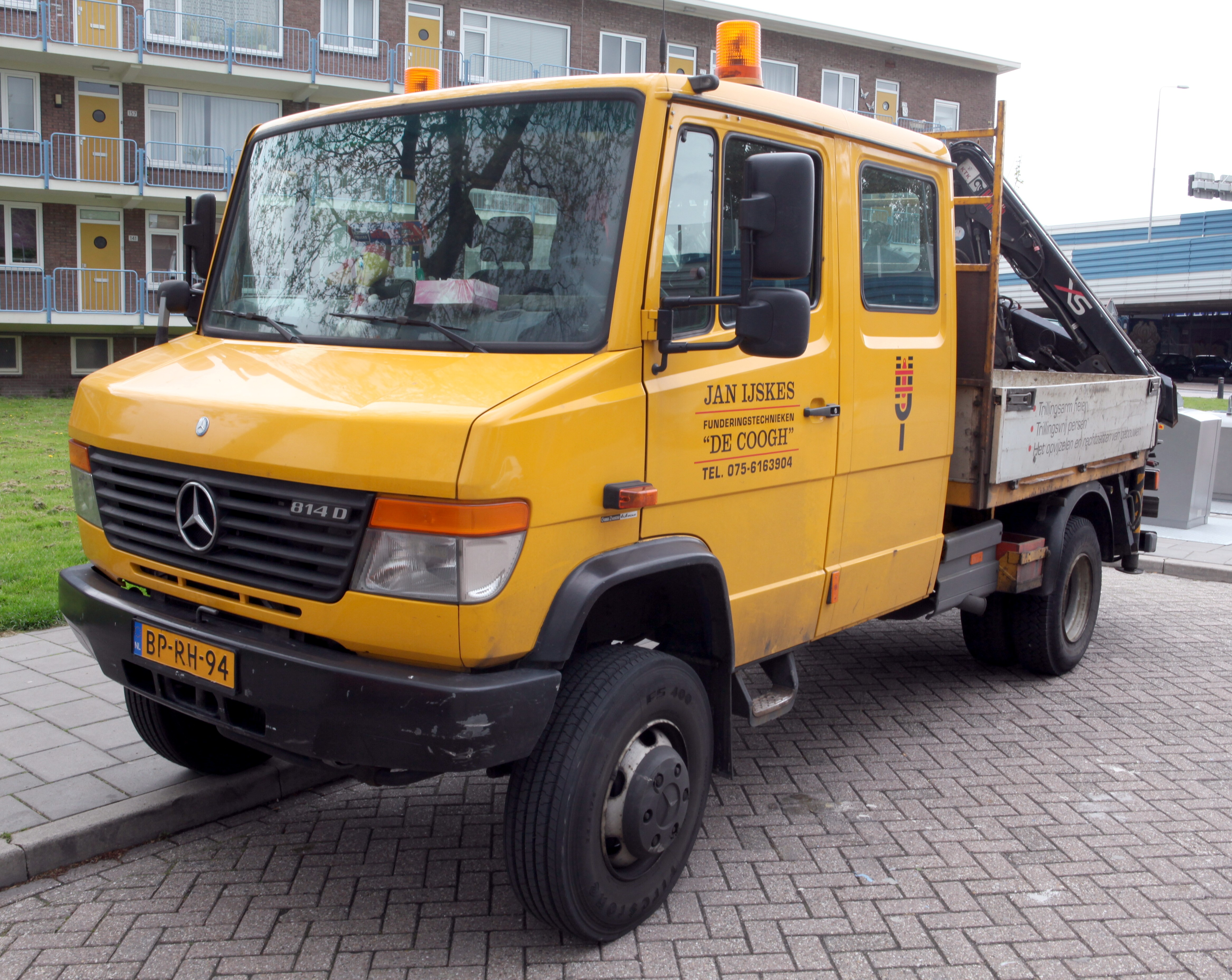
814D Vario Van with a Truck bed in the Netherlands in June 2012

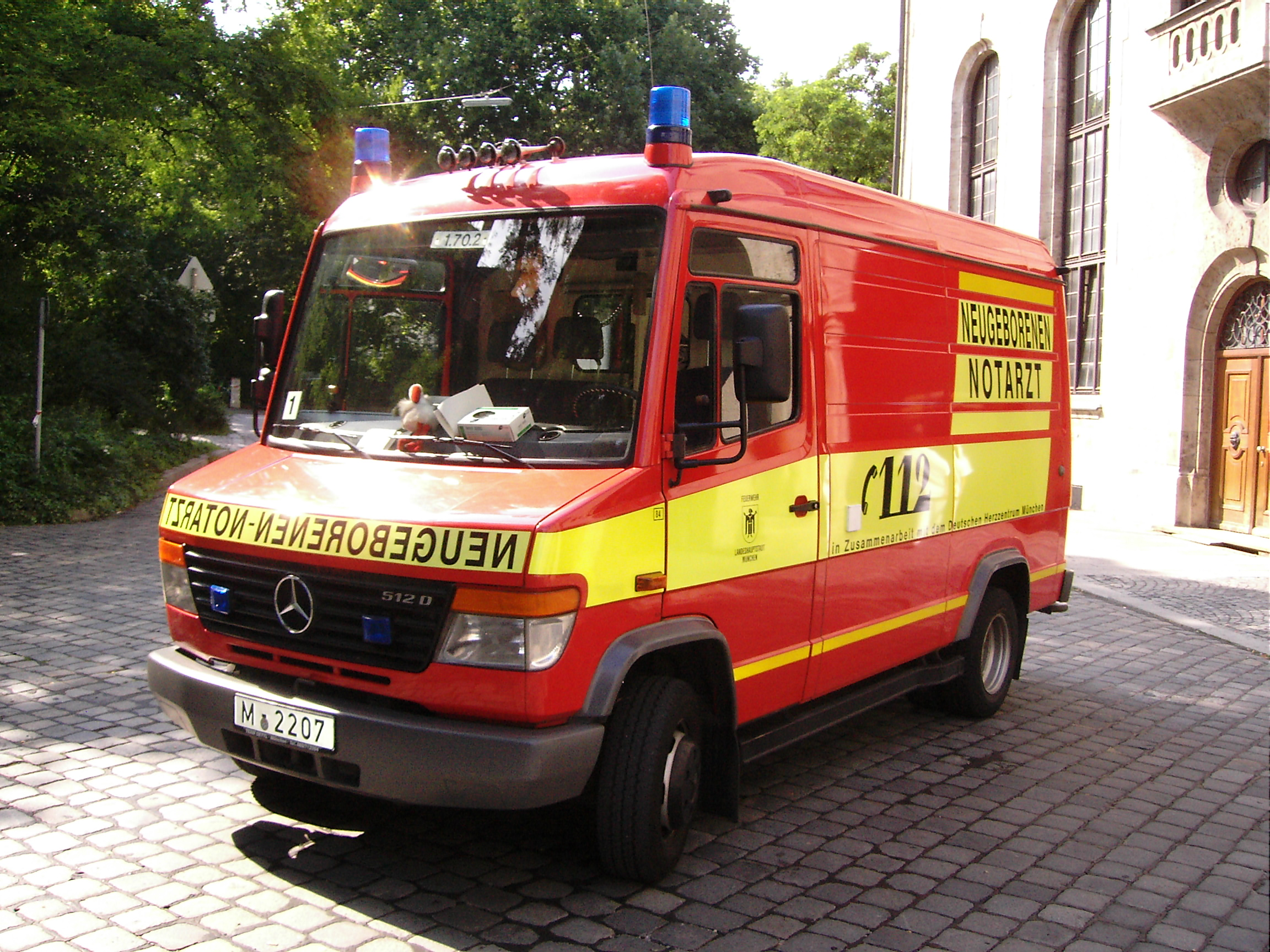
512D Vario Emergency doctor van in Germany in July 2007

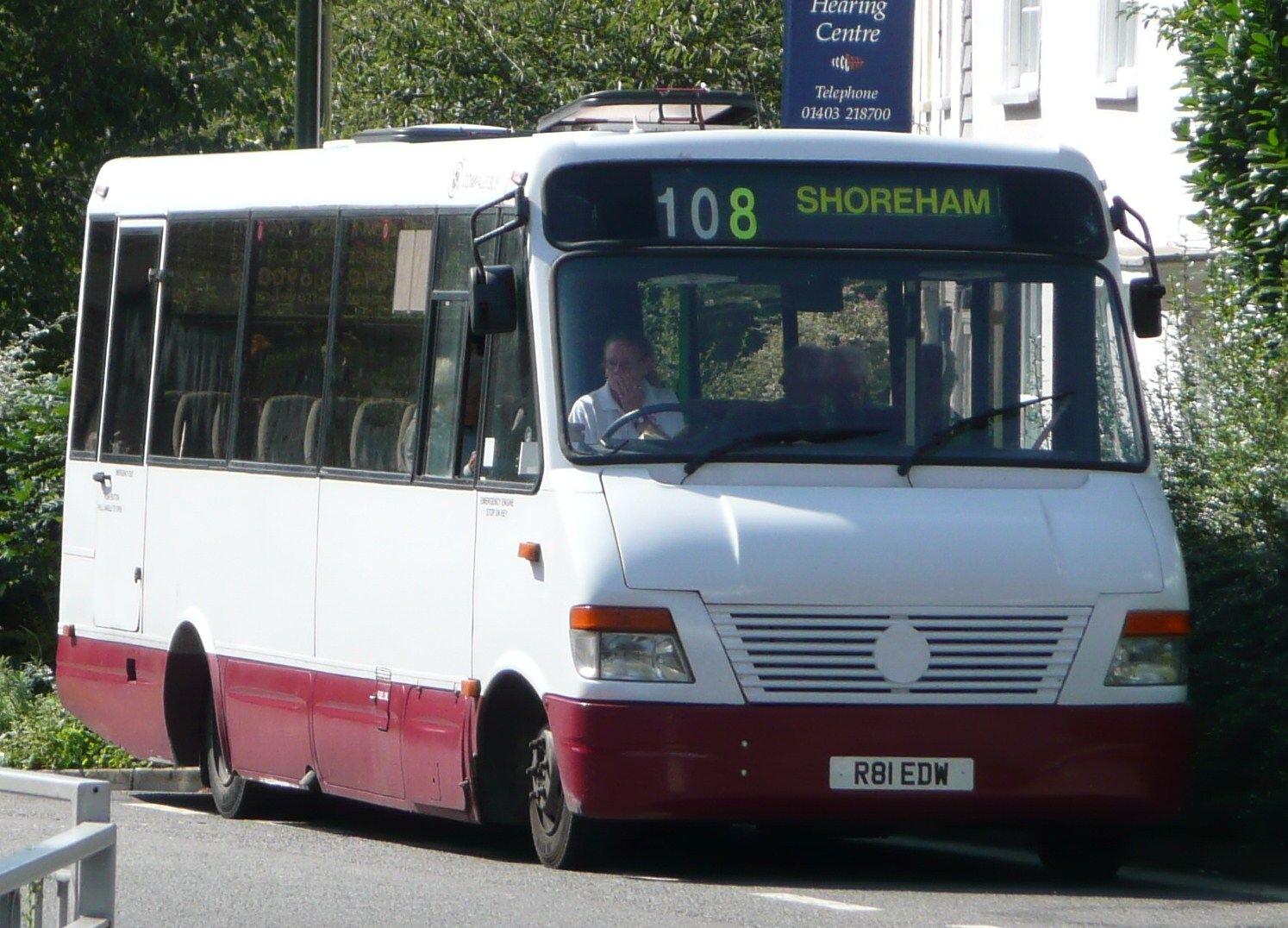
Compass Travel Autobus Classique bodied Vario in Horsham in April 2009
