= Bifort =

The Bifort was a British automobile manufactured by the Bifort Motor Company in Fareham, Hampshire from 1914 until 1920. The 10 hp light car was assembled from bought-in components mainly imported. The 1327 cc engine was from Belgium and the chassis was French. Bifort built the bodies, but few cars were made due to the outbreak of World War I.

After the war ended, the owner of Bifort, Herbert White, started the Duple Motor Body company at Hornsey in North London, which went on to become a major builder of bus bodies.
