= Bedford SB =

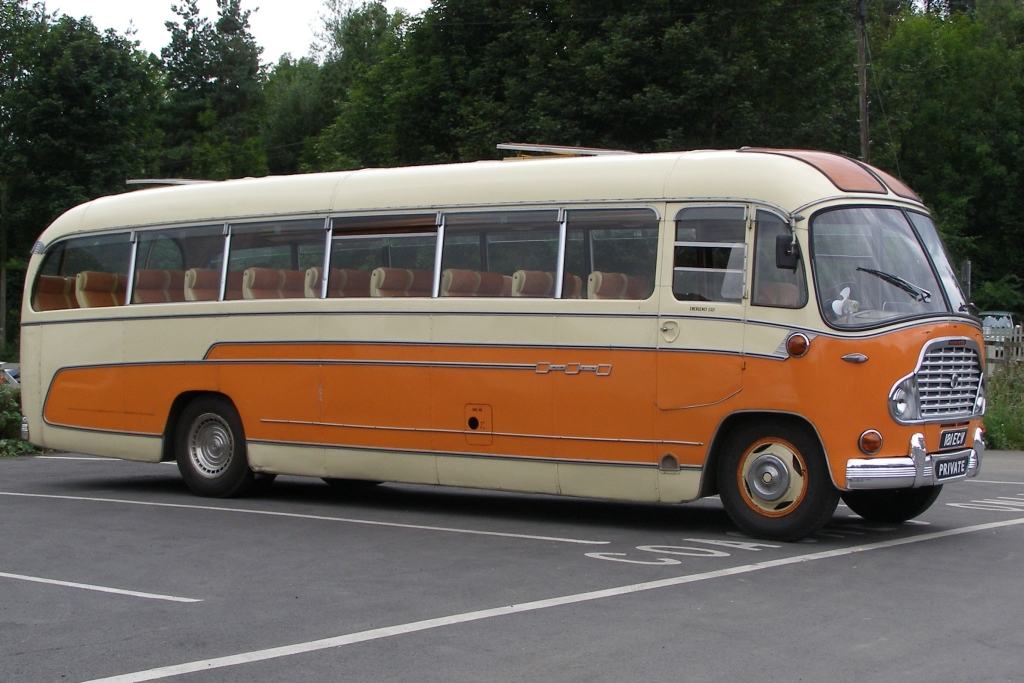
- A preserved Bedford SB in the United Kingdom

Overview
- Manufacturer: Bedford
- Production: 1950 - 1986
- Assembly: Luton

Body and chassis
- Doors: 1 or 2
- Floor type: Step entrance
- Chassis: Straight ladder frame

Powertrain
- Engine: Bedford; Perkins; Leyland; Cummins
- Transmission: 4-speed synchromesh 5-speed

Dimensions
- Length: 8.39m, later 9.14m
- Width: 2.28m, optionally 2.44m and later 2.50m

Chronology
- Predecessor: Bedford OB

The Bedford SB was a front-engined bus chassis manufactured by Bedford in England. It was launched at the 1950 Commercial Motor Show as the replacement for the Bedford OB.

It was the first Bedford vehicle to have a "forward control" design, with the driver's seat located at the right of the engine and the front axle underneath. It used a four-speed synchromesh gearbox, with five-speed gearboxes offered later. Initially only available with a Bedford petrol engine, from 1953 a Perkins R6 was an option, with a Bedford diesel and the Leyland O.350 options from 1957, and the Leyland O.370 from 1963.

Wheelbase length was originally 17 ft 2in (5.23 m), but from 1955 an 18 ft (5.49 m) option was also offered. Bodywork was provided by a wide range of builders, including Duple, Marshall, Plaxton, Harrington and Willowbrook. It was primarily fitted with one door, although examples were fitted with two.

From 1968, the SB series used computer classification codes from Bedford's parent company General Motors, with the petrol-engined SB3 variant becoming NFM, and the diesel-engined SB5 variant becoming NJM. However, they were rarely referred to under these codes.

The SB was built for the UK market and export. By 1980, over 54,000 had been produced, 38,000 being for overseas operators. Production ceased after 36 years in December 1986.

The Army, RAF and Royal Navy, plus several other government departments took large numbers of them. The Armed Forces version was more austere than civilian versions and capable of being converted to ambulances in times of emergency.

The New Zealand Railways Road Services were the largest operator, purchasing over 1.200 primarily with New Zealand Motor Bodies bodywork with some fitted with Caterpillar C7 engines and Allison Transmissions.

There were numerous variants of the SB, each determined by the engine fitted:

| Variant | Engine | Capacity (Cubic inches) | Capacity (Litres) |
|---|---|---|---|
| SB | Bedford petrol | 300 | 4.927 |
| SBG | Bedford petrol | 300 | 4.927 |
| SB3 | Bedford petrol | 300 | 4.927 |
| SBO | Perkins R6 diesel | 340 | 5.58 |
| SB1 | Bedford diesel | 300 | 4.917 |
| SB5 | Bedford diesel | 330 | 5.420 |
| SB8 | Leyland O.350 diesel | 350 | 5.74 |
| SB13 | Leyland O.370 diesel | 370 | 6.06 |
