= Duple Viceroy =

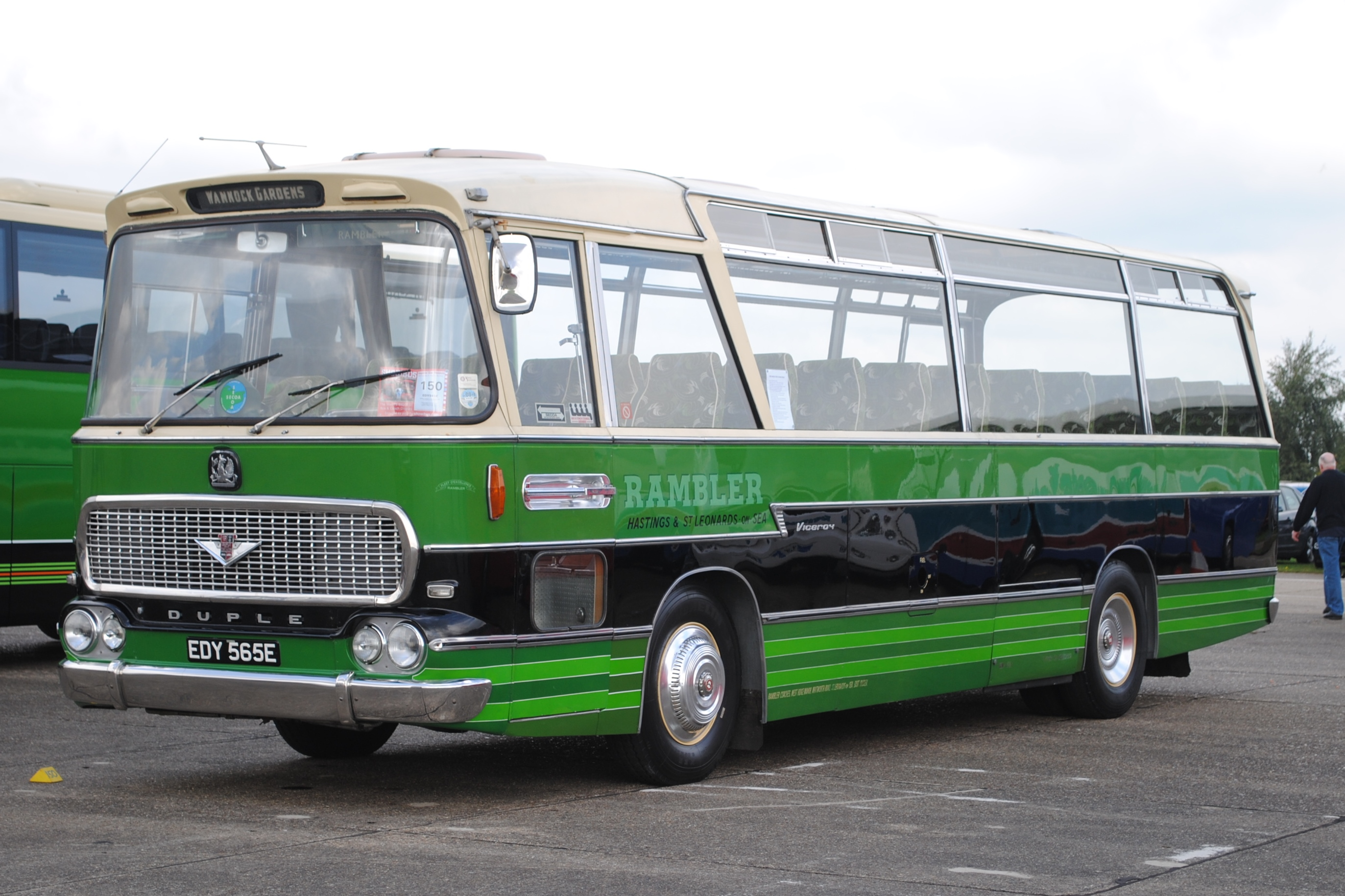
- preserved 1967 Bedford VAM14 / Duple Viceroy

Overview
- Manufacturer: Duple
- Production: 1966–1972

Body and chassis
- Doors: 1 door
- Floor type: Step entrance
- Chassis: AEC Reliance; Bedford VAL; Bedford VAM; Bedford YRQ & YRT; Ford R192 & R226; Leyland Leopard; Seddon Pennine 6

Dimensions
- Length: 10, 11 or 12 metres

Chronology
- Predecessor: Duple Bella Venture, Commander IV, Empress, Mariner, Vega Major and Viscount
- Successor: Duple Dominant

The Duple Viceroy was a type of coach bodywork built by Duple between 1966 and 1972. It was initially launched on lightweight front-engined chassis, but it was latterly built on mid-engined and heavyweight chassis as well. A variant of the Viceroy was the Duple Viceroy Express, which had a bus-type entrance door making it suitable for stage carriage work.

== History ==
In 1966 Duple's standard 'Bella' family of coach bodies for full-sized front-engined chassis was sold under a variety of model names specific to the chassis: Bella Venture (Bedford VAM), Empress (Ford R192), Mariner (Ford R226) and Vega Major (Bedford VAL), all of which were built at Duple's original Hendon factory in North London. For heavyweight and other mid-engined chassis the larger-windowed Commander body was built at the Duple (Northern) factory in Blackpool, and the similar Viscount was also built in Blackpool as an alternative, premium body for the VAM and R192.

Duple's coach designs were usually updated every two or three years, and for the 1967 season the range was due a major re-design. Duple had been losing sales to its main rival Plaxton, whose large-windowed Panorama model was making Duple's Bella range look dated. The new Viceroy model announced in August 1966 sought to address this and to outdo Plaxton by not only making the windows longer, but also providing large quarterlight windows above the cantrail level. Although quarterlights had long been available as an option on many coach bodies these were usually small curved glass or perspex windows which tended to look like an afterthought on large-windowed coaches like the Commander and Panorama, whereas those on the Viceroy were much longer and were made of flat glass angled slightly inwards towards the roof. The effect was to make the upper half of the coach aft of the angled window pillar appear to be entirely glazed when viewed from the side. The preceding Bella family had as its distinctive styling feature one window pillar over the rear axle raked sharply back, and the Viceroy achieved similar distinctiveness by having the pillar behind the front axle raked forward. The original Viceroy was deliberately angular in its styling, with its chrome trim laid out to accentuate the raked window pillar and the stepped window line at the cantrail.

Production of the new Viceroy range began at Hendon in late 1966 for the 1967 sales season, on Bedford VAL/VAM and Ford R192/R226 chassis. Bodies on the 32-foot VAM and R192 could seat up to 45 passengers, whereas the longer 36-foot Viceroy 36 on the VAL and R226 seated up to 52. Initially the Viscount body remained in production at Blackpool, but it was soon eclipsed by the Viceroy and was dropped after the 1967 season, by which time production of the Viceroy 36 on the three-axle Bedford VAL chassis had already been transferred to Blackpool. For the 1968 and 1969 seasons Blackpool also built Viceroy 36/37 bodies on the R226, leaving the Hendon factory with the shorter VAM and R192 Viceroys and the smaller Duple models until its closure in early 1970, whereupon all manufacture was transferred to Blackpool. One of the last chassis to be bodied at Hendon was a pre-production Bedford YRQ, the first mid-engined chassis to receive a Viceroy body.

A facelift for the Viceroy range was announced at the 1968 Commercial Motor Show for the 1969 season. The angular styling of the original Viceroy was toned down and the facelift sought instead to emphasise the horizontal lines of the body with a new chromework layout, a wider front grille and revised headlamp and front bumper designs. By this time the maximum length for UK buses and coaches had been increased to 12 metres (39 ft 4 in) and the facelift also included a slight increase in length for the VAL and R226 bodies, henceforth known as the Viceroy 37 and seating up to 53.

Despite the facelifts for the Viceroy and Commander, rivals Plaxton had again stolen the march on Duple with the launch of their own new model at the same show. With its even larger curved-glass windows, the Plaxton Panorama Elite made the Viceroy and (especially) the Commander look dated and Duple fell behind Plaxton in sales for the first time during the 1969 season. Faced with the need to design a completely new model to challenge the Panorama Elite while at the same time transferring production from Hendon to Blackpool, Duple had no immediate answer to this problem, and the Viceroy range did not receive any major styling changes for the remainder of its production life.

In its final years the Viceroy became available on a wider range of chassis. The Commander body had been dropped in 1970, so for the 1971 and 1972 seasons the Viceroy and Viceroy 37 were made available on heavyweight mid-engined AEC Reliance and Leyland Leopard chassis, although production of these totalled only 66 because the increasingly dated Viceroy was no match for the Panorama Elite at the premium end of the coach market. Much more significant in sales terms was the Bedford YRQ which replaced the VAM in late 1970. For the final 1972 season the Viceroy was also built on the front-engined Seddon Pennine 6 in 10-, 11- and 12-metre lengths, the latter being the first 12m coaches built by Duple and seating 57. During 1972 the three-axle Bedford VAL model was replaced by the more conventional mid-engined Bedford YRT, and although Duple had not initially intended to offer the outgoing Viceroy range on the new chassis one batch of five Viceroy 37s was built to a special order for Edinburgh Corporation Transport, which needed the vehicles before the new Dominant body would be available.

The British Government's "Bus Grant" provided a 50% subsidy towards the cost of new service buses, but did not apply to coaches. However, many operators used their coaches on local bus services as well as coaching, particularly in the winter months when coach business was quieter. For the 1972 season the Viceroy Express body was built on YRQ and R192 chassis, this having bus-type doors and other modifications to make them suitable for OMO (one-man operation) stage carriage services. Provided such vehicles spent a specified proportion of their annual mileage working bus services they qualified for the subsidy.

Despite being increasingly outmoded the Viceroy, along with the smaller Vista and Vega, continued to sell well on lightweight chassis until the end of production. For the 1972 season Duple's total output was 1,034 bodies, its highest for several years and only 251 below that of market leader Plaxton.

== Replacement ==
At the end of 1972 the all new Duple Dominant was launched to replace the Viceroy. The Dominant was heavily influenced by the styling of the Plaxton Panorama Elite, with the same large curved windows and the added advantage of being of all-metal construction. Viceroy bodies remained a common sight on Britain's roads well into the 1980s, but their timber-framed construction and the fact that they were almost all built on less durable lightweight chassis meant that by the end of the decade very few were still in use as coaches.

== Accidents and incidents ==
A Duple Viceroy was involved in the Dibbles Bridge coach crash in 1975, Britain's worst ever road accident. After the brakes on a 1967 Bedford VAM5 failed it ran out of control down a steep gradient and rolled over on the curve at the bottom, falling over the side of a bridge and landing on and crushing its roof. The coach had carried a full load of 45 passengers plus the driver, of whom only 13 passengers survived. The accident led to tougher structural standards for coach bodywork, although by that time Duple and other manufacturers had already switched from wooden frames to stronger all-metal bodies.

== Gallery ==
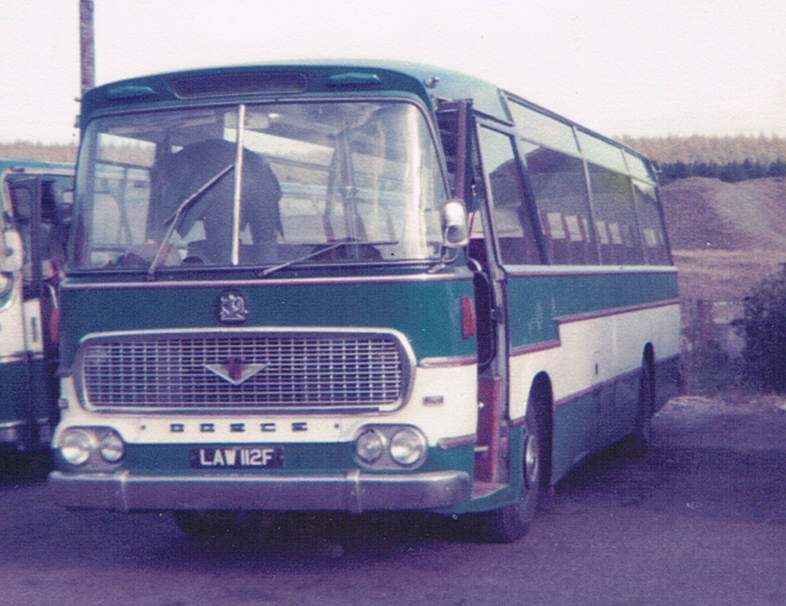
1968 Bedford VAM70 / Duple Viceroy (pre-facelift)

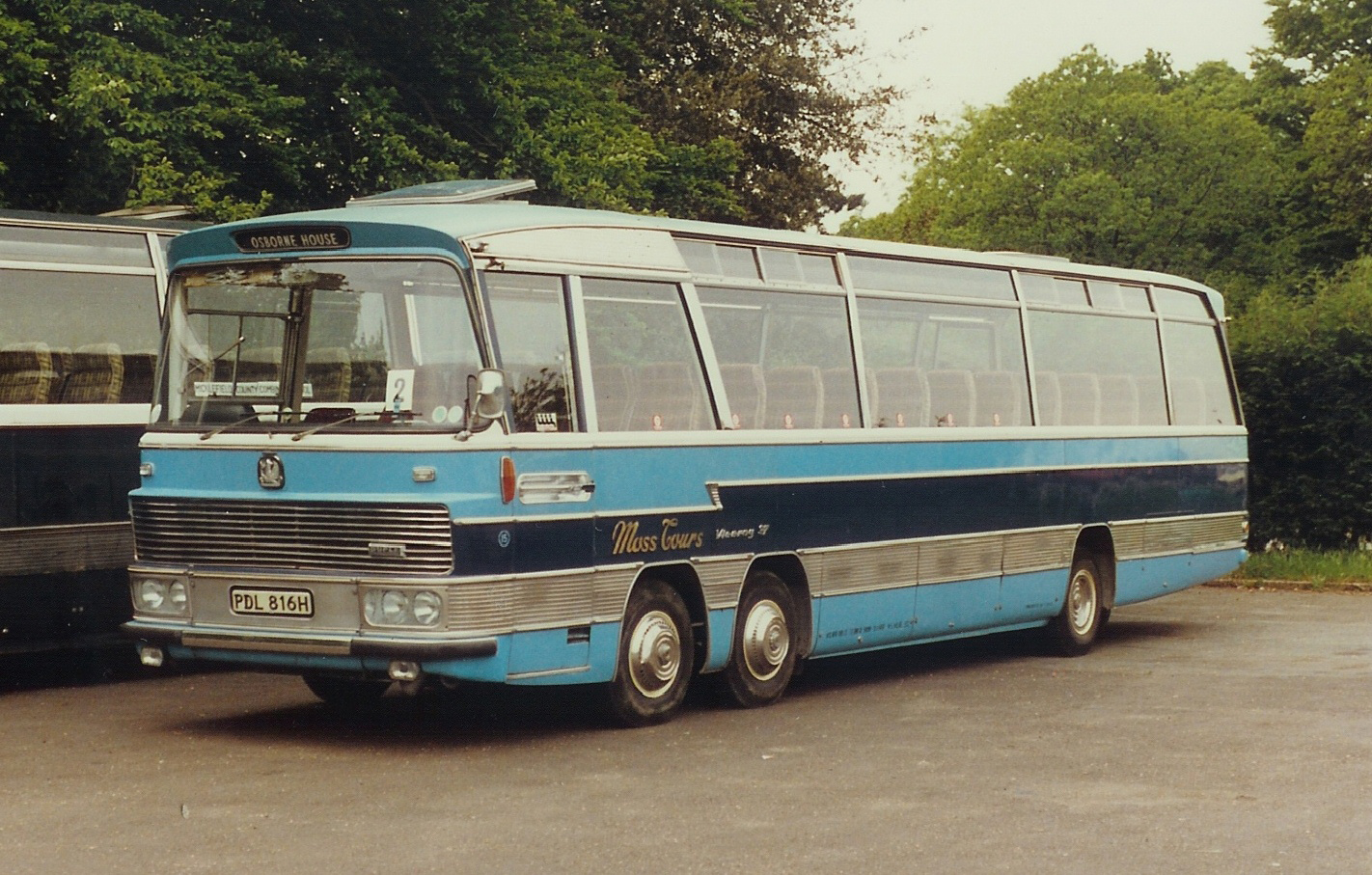
1970 Bedford VAL70 / Duple Viceroy 37 (post facelift, but with a non-standard chrome coachline of the pre-facelift type)

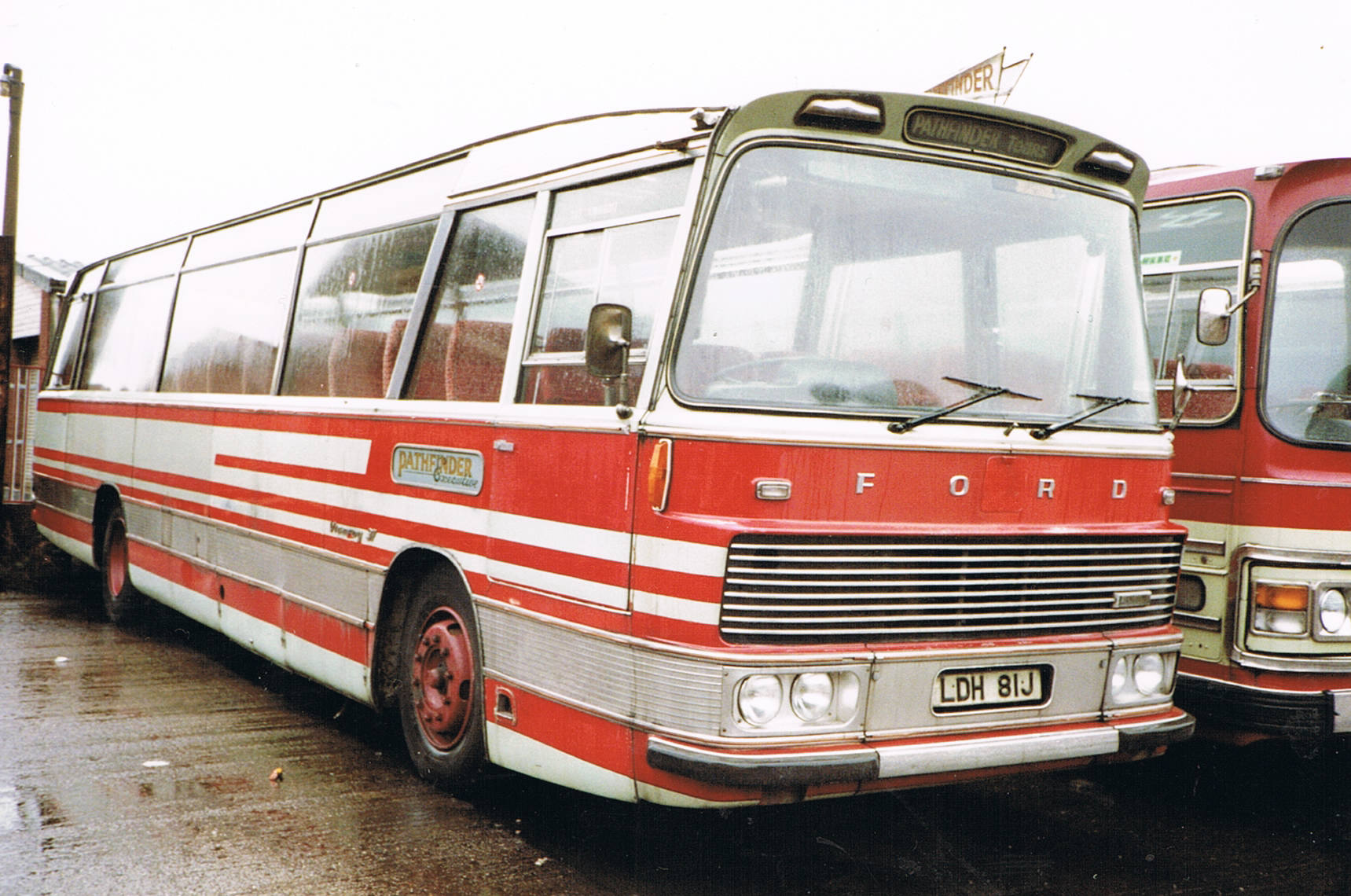
1971 Ford R226 / Duple Viceroy 37 (post facelift)

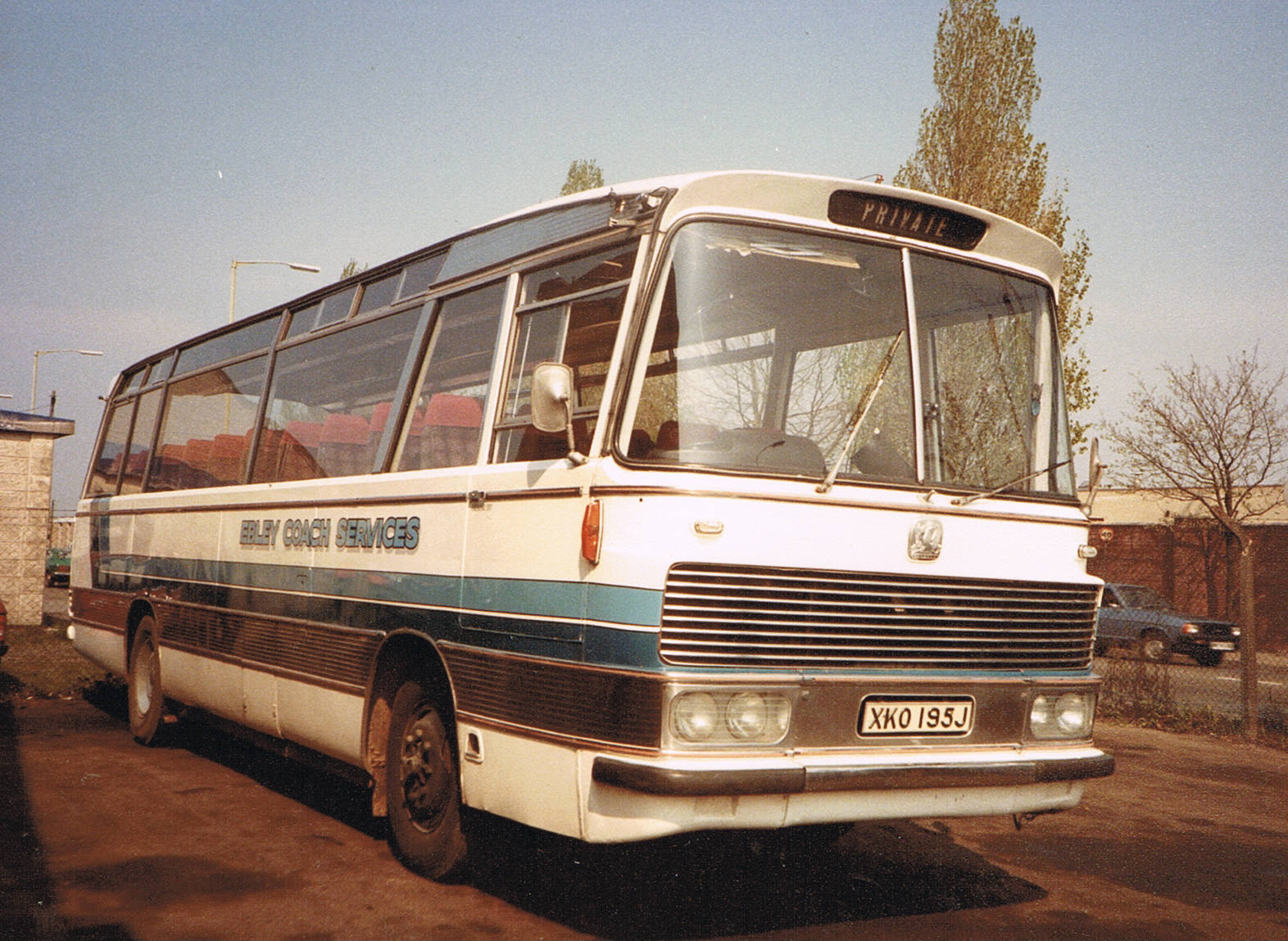
1971 Bedford YRQ / Duple Viceroy. Bodies on Bedford Y-series chassis were taller and had a higher floor level than those on other chassis.

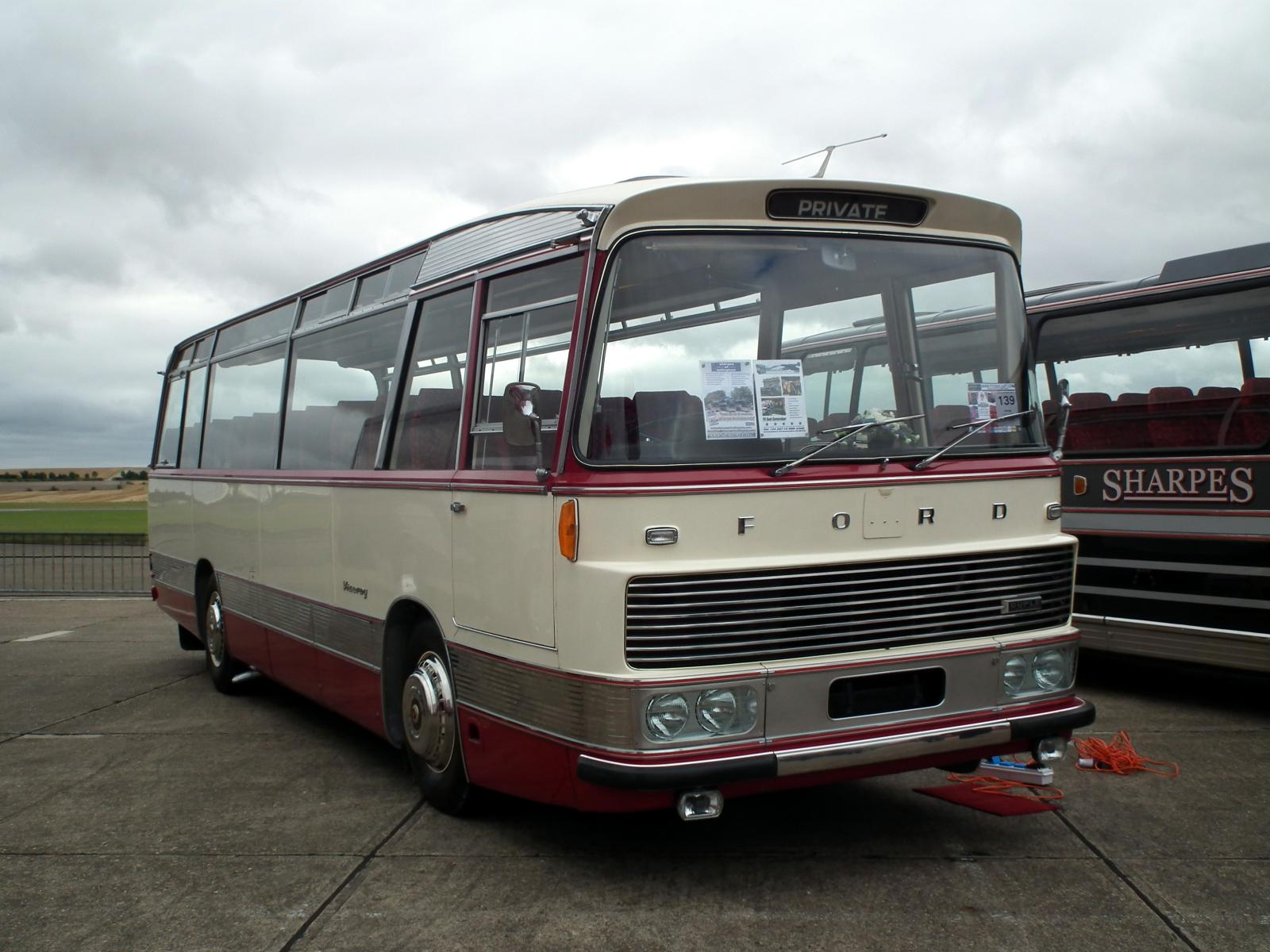
1971 Ford R192 / Duple Viceroy. This particular coach was never registered and is preserved in brand new condition.

== See also ==
- List of buses

== Sources ==
- Brown, Stewart J. (2007). Plaxton 100 Years: A Century of Innovation 1907-2007. Ian Allan Publishing.
- Townsin, Alan (1998). Duple: 70 Years of Coachbuilding. Venture Publications Ltd. ISBN 1-898432-46-5.
