= Bedford OB =

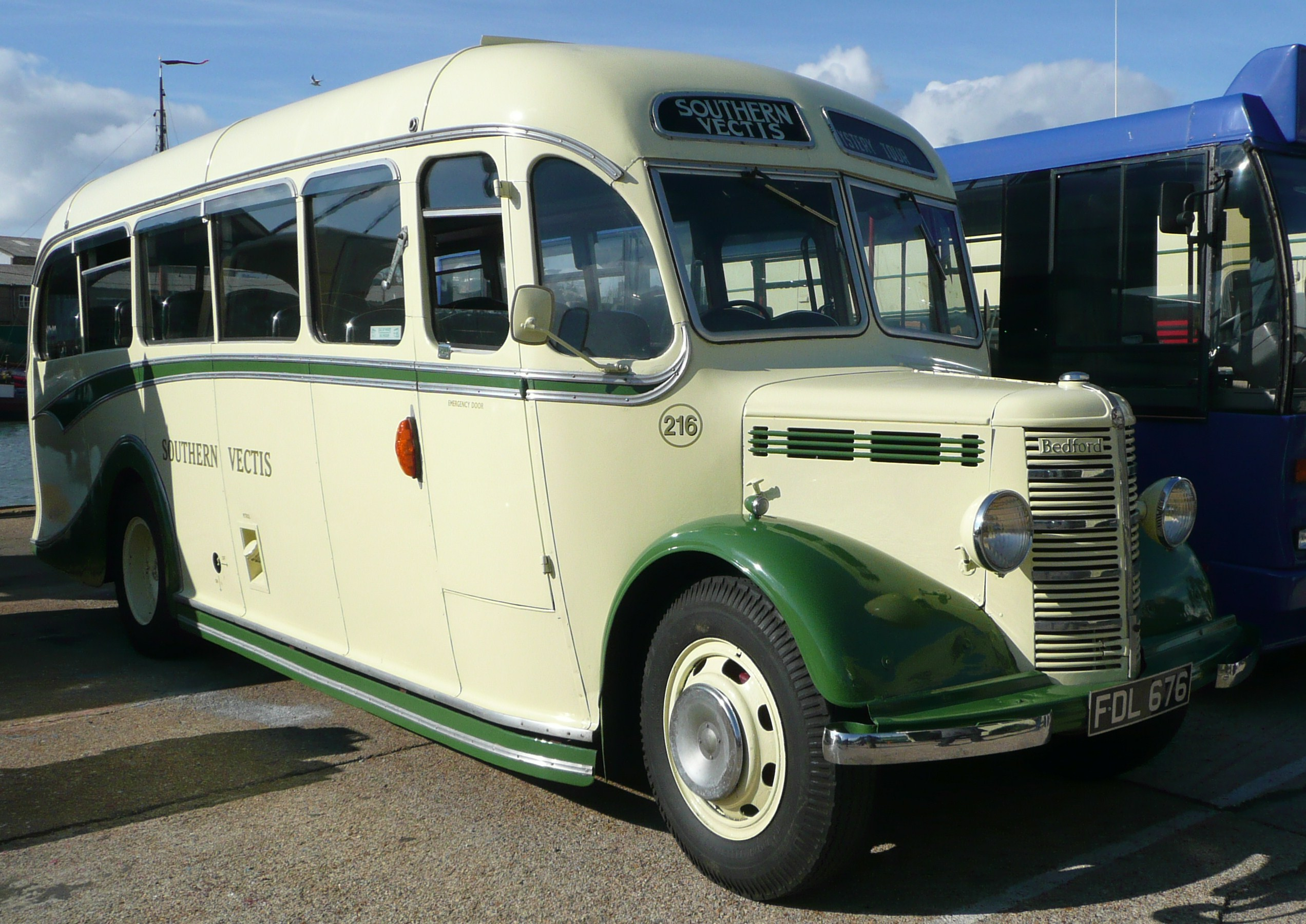
- A preserved Bedford OB previously operated by Southern Vectis

Overview
- Manufacturer: Bedford
- Production: 1939-1951

Body and chassis
- Doors: 1
- Floor type: Step entrance

Chronology
- Predecessor: Bedford WTB
- Successor: Bedford SB

The Bedford OB was a bus chassis manufactured by Bedford from 1939.

== History ==
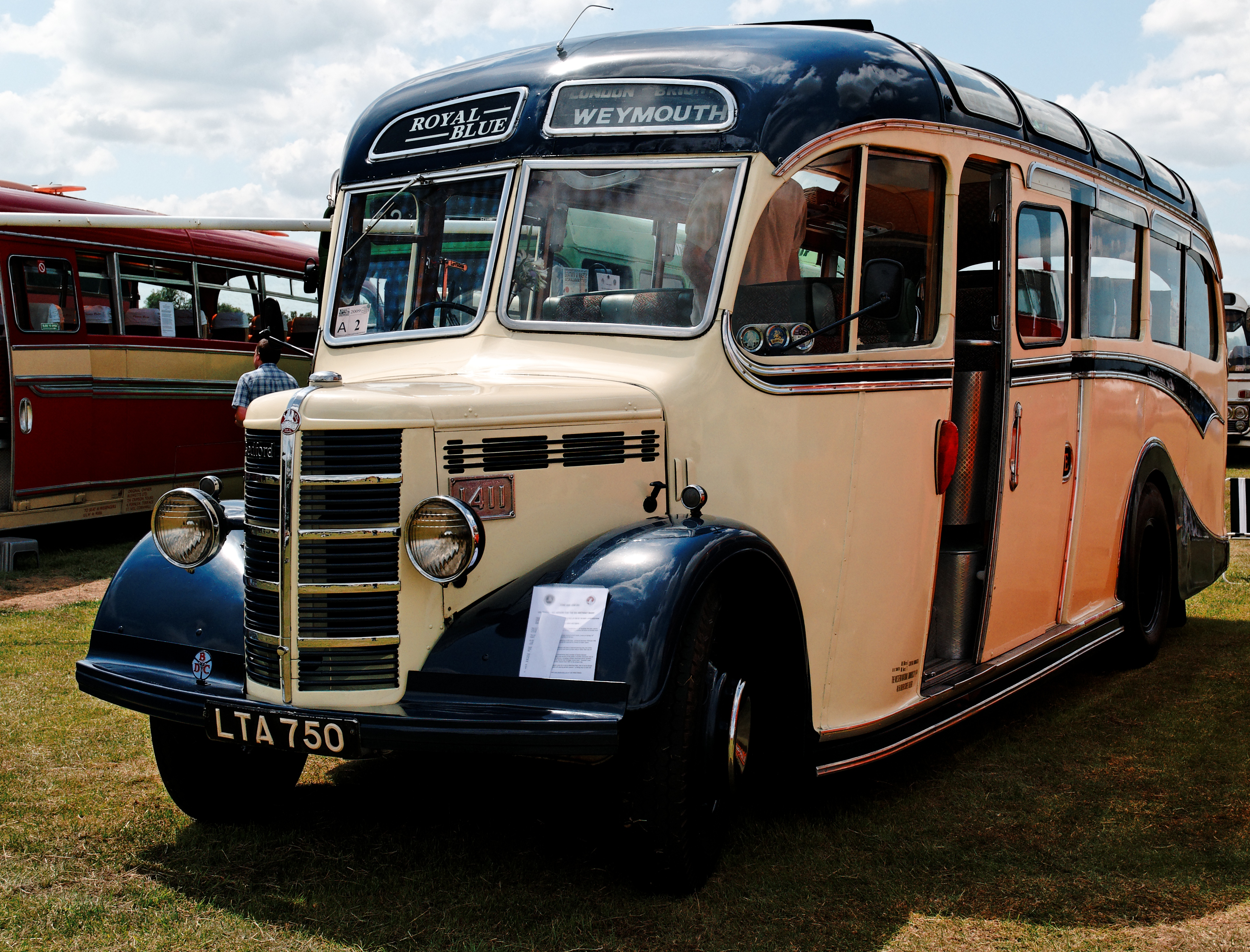
Preserved 1949 Royal Blue Coach Services Duple Vista bodied OB

The Bedford OB was designed as a successor to the Bedford WTB. It had a wheelbase of 14 feet 6 inches (4.42 m), and was a semi-forward control model, designed to carry 26 to 29-passenger bodywork. It was fitted with a 28 RAC tax horsepower petrol engine, a four-speed manual gearbox and a fully floating rear axle. The brakes were of the vacuum servo-assisted hydraulic type.

Although only 73 were built prior to the cessation of production due to World War II, it reappeared in a largely unchanged form at the end of the war, continuing in production until 1951. A total of 12,766 were produced, making it one of the most popular buses of its type ever.

Bedford co-developed with Duple the "Vista" coachwork for the OB, fronted by a classic bullnose. The ash framework was reinforced with steel, and the floor made from hardwood with softwood tongued and grooved boarding, with the exception of the cab area which was finished with alloy chequerplate. Seating capacity was normally 29 with overhead luggage racks provided for passengers, whilst the rear luggage boot was also used to store the spare wheel. The price of a complete coach, including finishing in a two-colour livery, was £1,314.10s for a 27-seater, and £1,325.10s for a twenty nine seater.

Geared to reach speeds of at least 40 miles per hour (64 km/h), which was fast for its day, the OB is remembered by many for its characteristic gearbox whine.

== Pre-war OB ==
The Bedford "O" type lorry chassis was introduced in August 1939, with a coach-chassis version named the "OB". Duple Coachbuilders modified their 'Hendonian' body to fit the chassis, which at 14 ft 6 in (4.42 m) was longer than the previous WTB model. The six cylinder overhead valve power unit with a capacity of 3519 cc, introduced in 1938, developed 72 bhp (54 kW; 73 PS) at 3000 rpm.

Only 73 OB buses were built in the two months before production ceased at the outbreak of World War II. All of Vauxhall and Bedford's production was turned over to the war effort, producing the Churchill tank.

== Wartime OWB ==
The Bedford OWB chassis was produced during the war to the same basic design as the OB, but replacing valuable metals, like aluminium, with cast iron, and fitted with austere bodywork and interior featuring 32 seats with no upholstery, just wooden slats like a park bench. Bodies were designed and built by Duple Coachbuilders and bodies to Duple drawings were also built by Charles H. Roe in Leeds, Mulliners in Birmingham and Scottish Motor Traction in Edinburgh. Total OWB production was 3,398, finishing in late 1945, the majority of the utility bodies were by Duple, a trend that continued post-war.

== Post-war OB ==
Bedford restarted the production of the OB again in October 1945, this time at the Bedford Dunstable plant. There were only minor changes to the pre-war design. From the end of the war, until 1951, a total of 12,693 OB's were built. The Vista remained Duple's standard OB body, until production ceased in 1951. It was succeeded by the Bedford SB.

Some wartime OWBs were rebuilt to post-war OB standard.

== Exports ==
The OB was sold in other Commonwealth countries, with Commonwealth Aircraft Corporation bodying many in Australia.

== Preservation ==
The OB is one of the most popular coaches in preservation. There are known to be 180 still in existence, nearly 70 in roadworthy condition, and 30 are licensed for private hire work. They have regularly appeared in period television programmes including Foyle's War, Miss Marple and Endeavour.

To celebrate its 70th anniversary, on 30 August 2009, a gathering was held at the Vauxhall Heritage Centre in Luton with OBs on display, before making a road run to Bletchley Park. To celebrate the 75th anniversary, a gathering was held at Luton on 16/17 August 2014, with a run to the Millbrook Proving Ground.

Several OBs in Australia and New Zealand have also been preserved.
