= Duple Coachbuilders =

English coach and bus body manufacturer (1919-1989)

Duple
- Industry: Bus manufacturing
- Founded: 1919
- Founder: Herbert White
- Defunct: 1989
- Headquarters: Hornsey, London; Blackpool, Lancashire

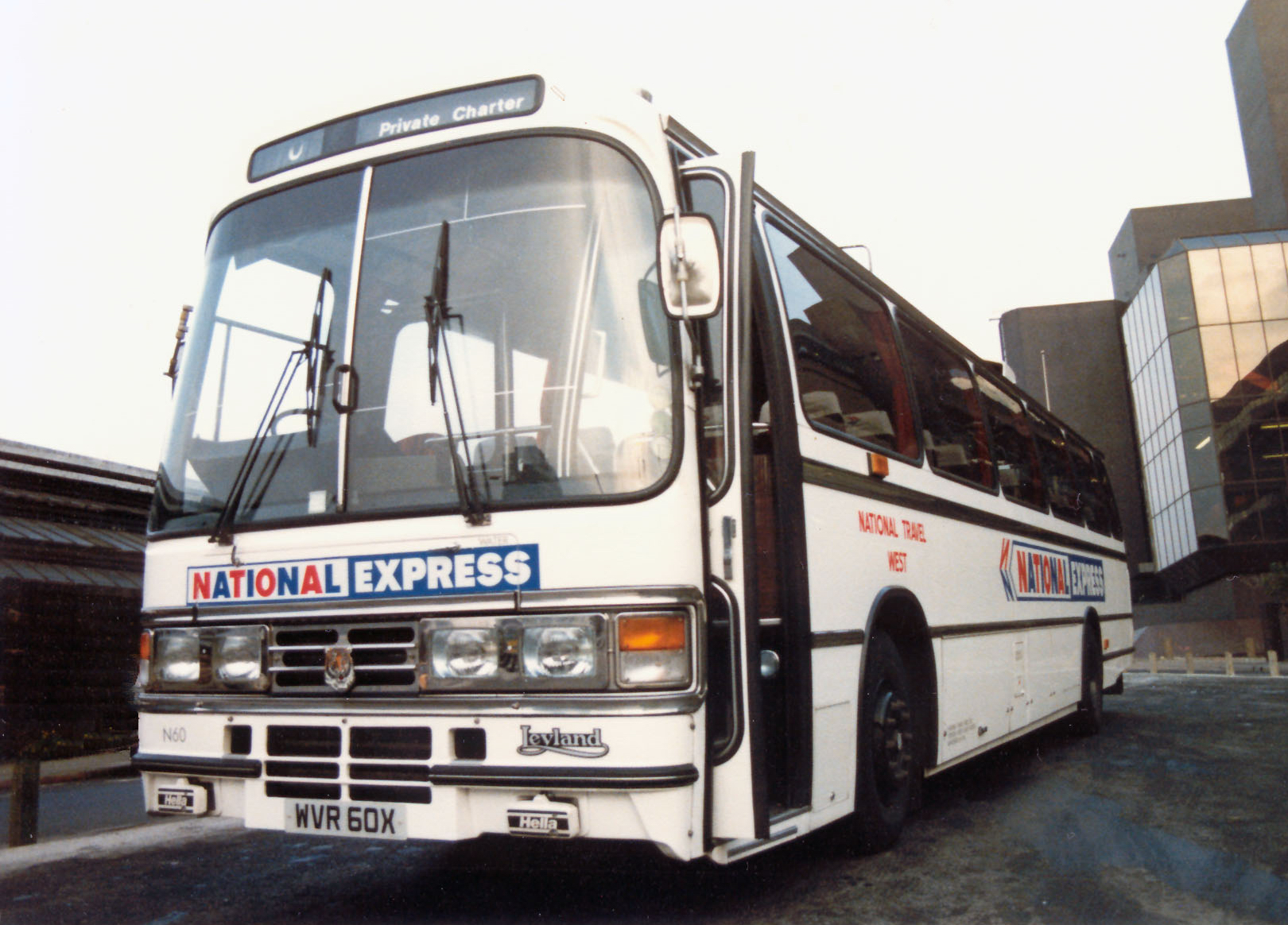
A National Express Dominant IV-bodied Leyland Tiger in Liverpool in 1982.

Duple Coachbuilders was a coach and bus bodybuilder in England from 1919 until 1989.

== History ==
Duple Bodies & Motors was formed in 1919 by Herbert White in Hornsey, London. Before World War I, he had briefly built cars under the Bifort name in Fareham, Hampshire.

=== Early days ===
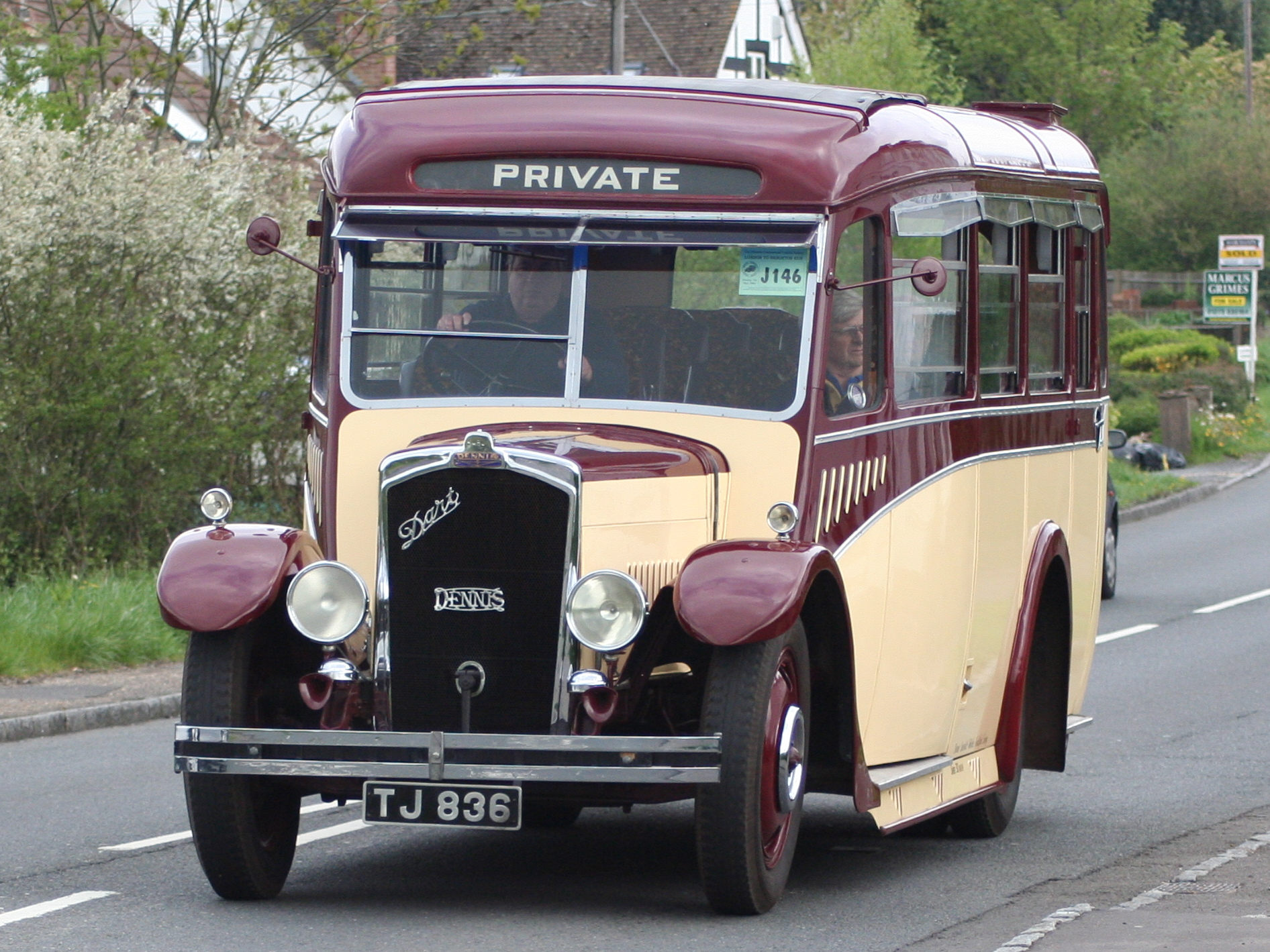
1933 Dennis Dart / Duple

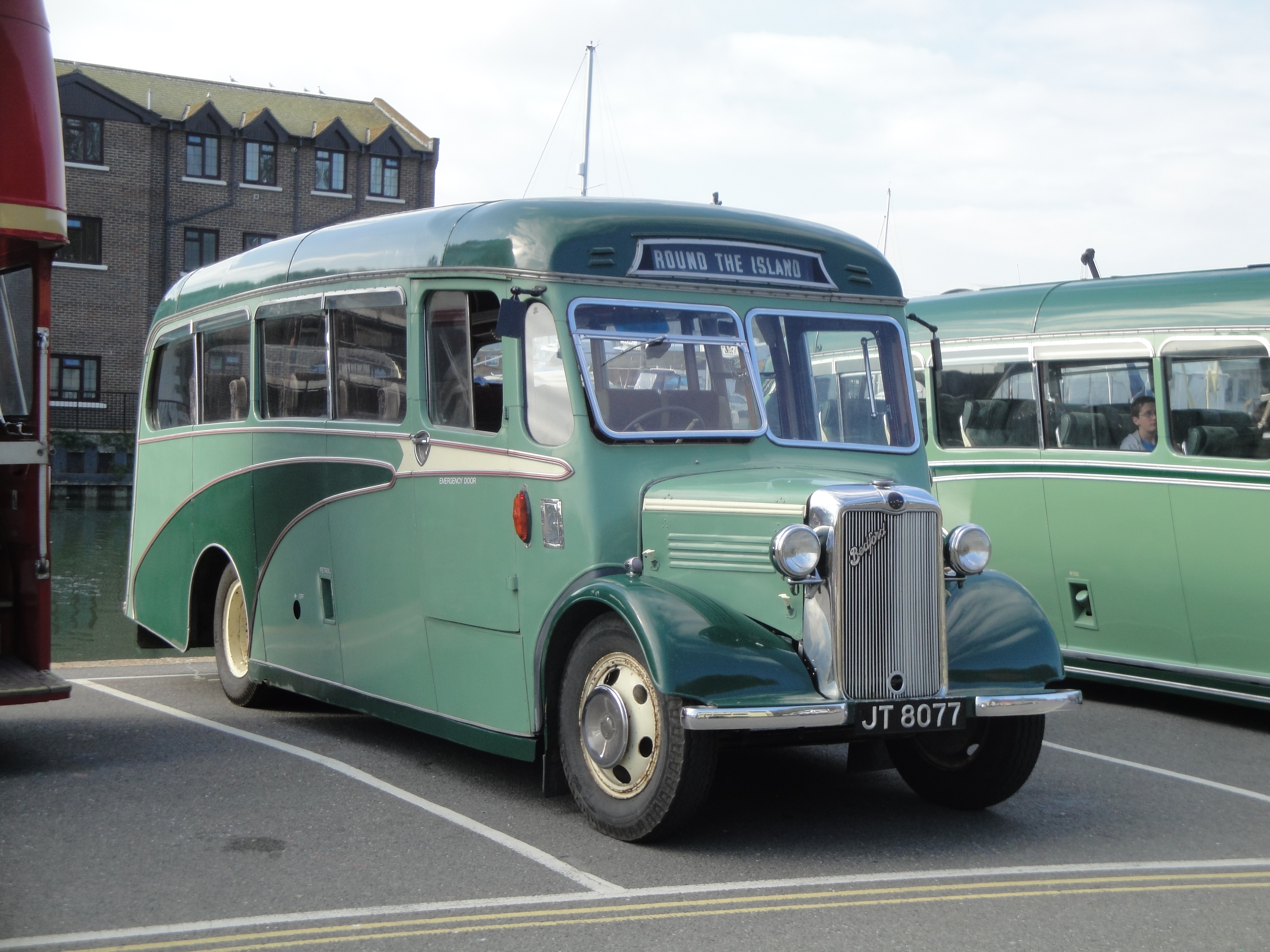
1937 Bedford WTB / Duple

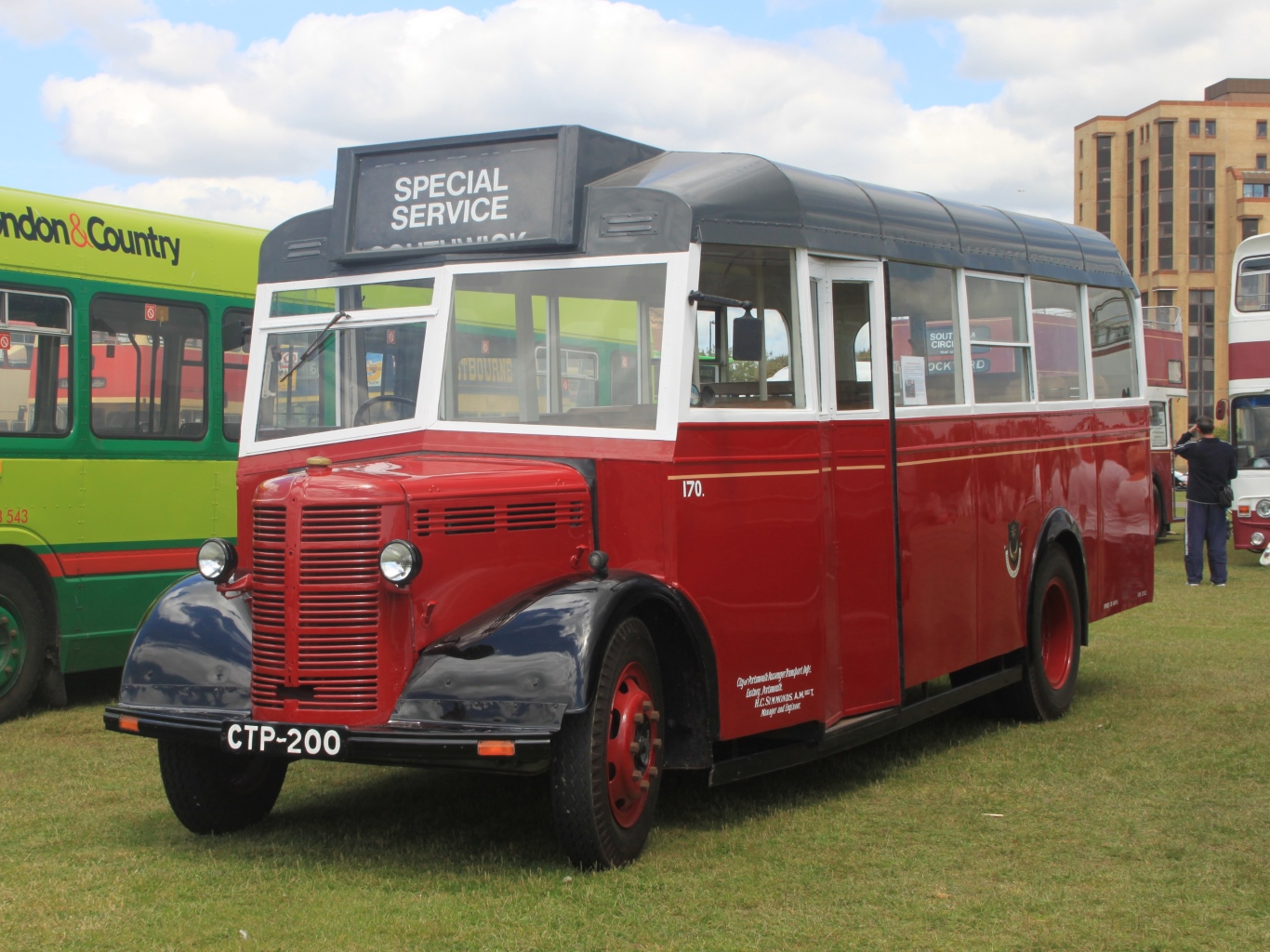
Preserved 1944 Bedford OWB with replica Duple utility body. Wartime bodies used untreated timber and often had short lives

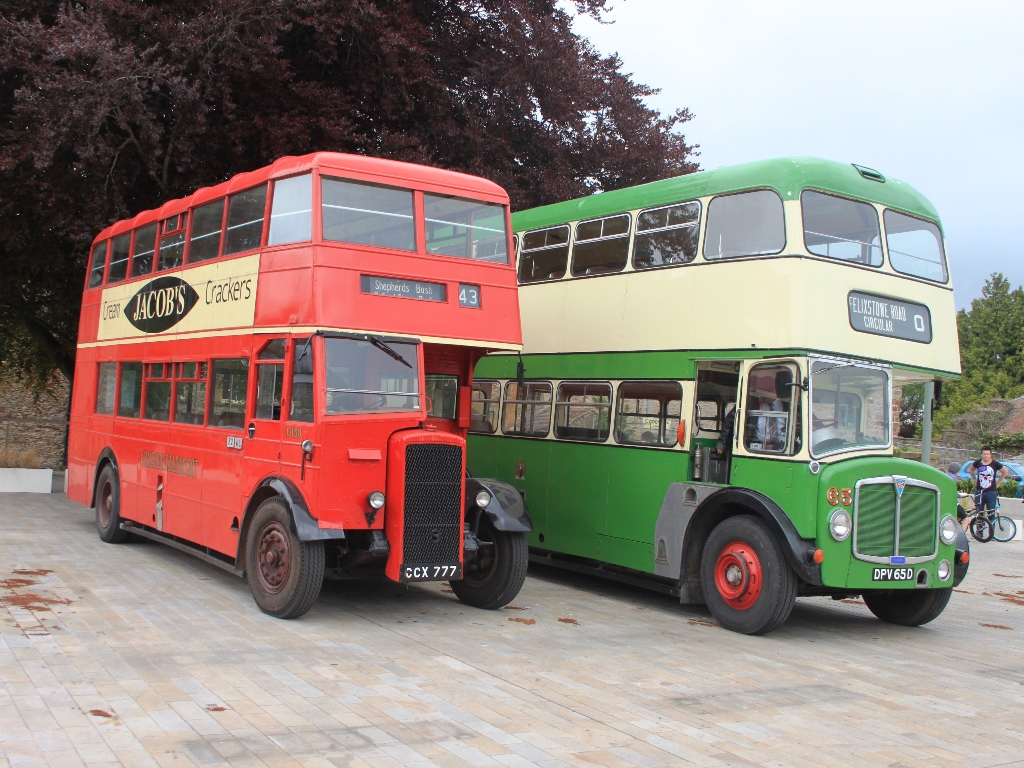
1945 Daimler CW / Duple utility (left)

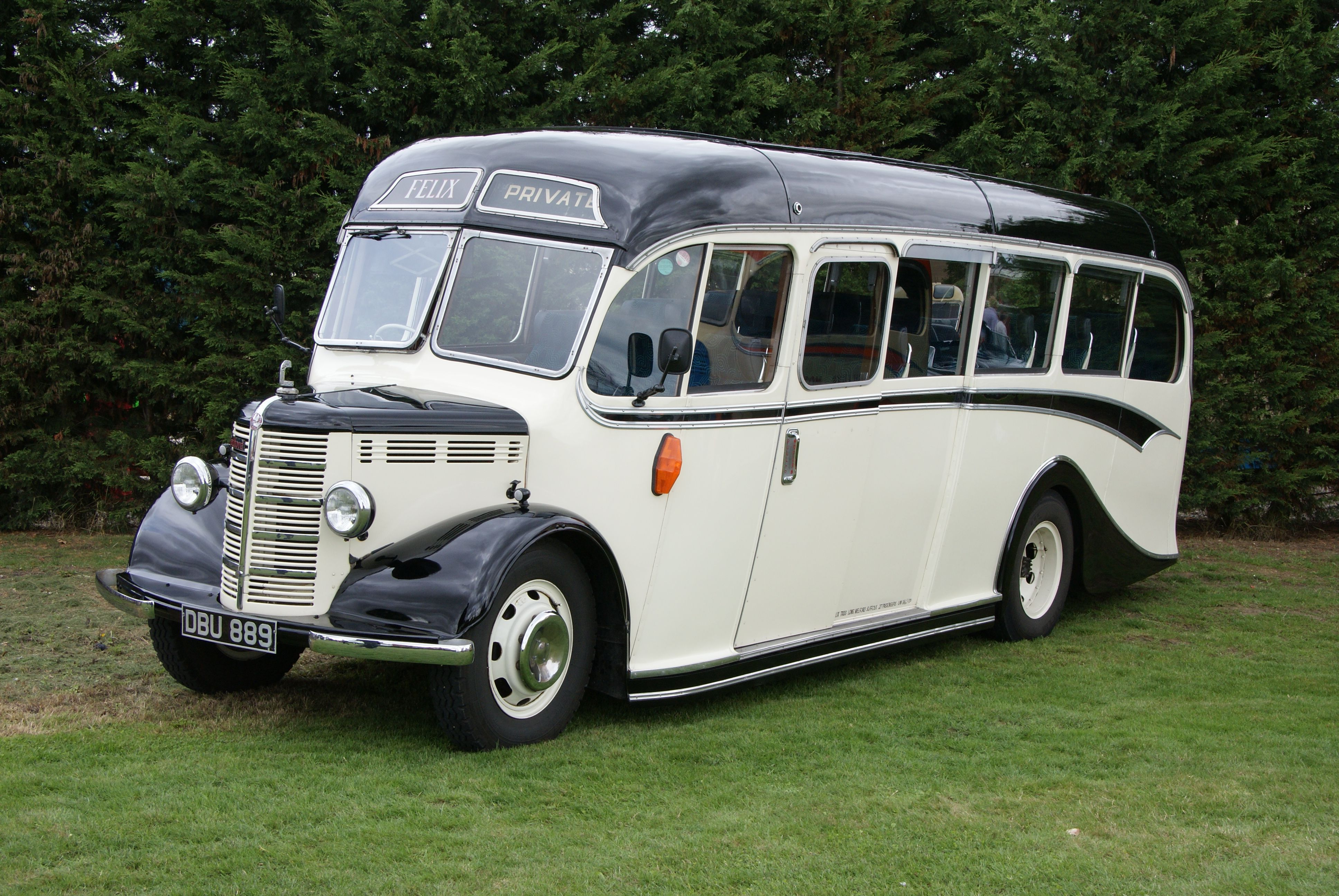
1947 Duple Vista bodied Bedford OB

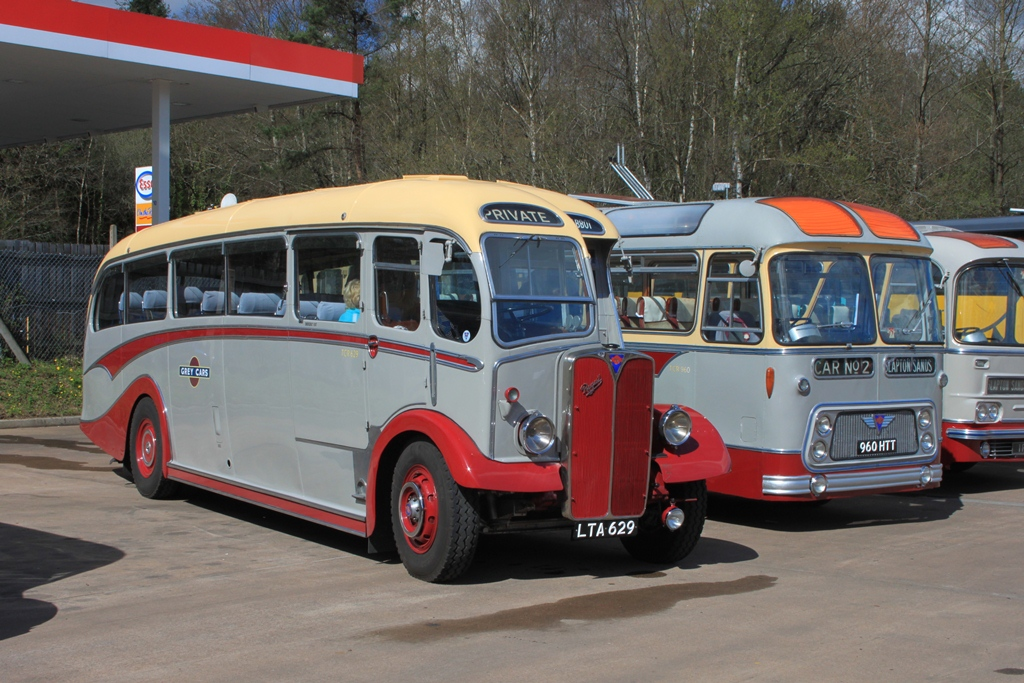
1950 Duple A-type bodied AEC Regal

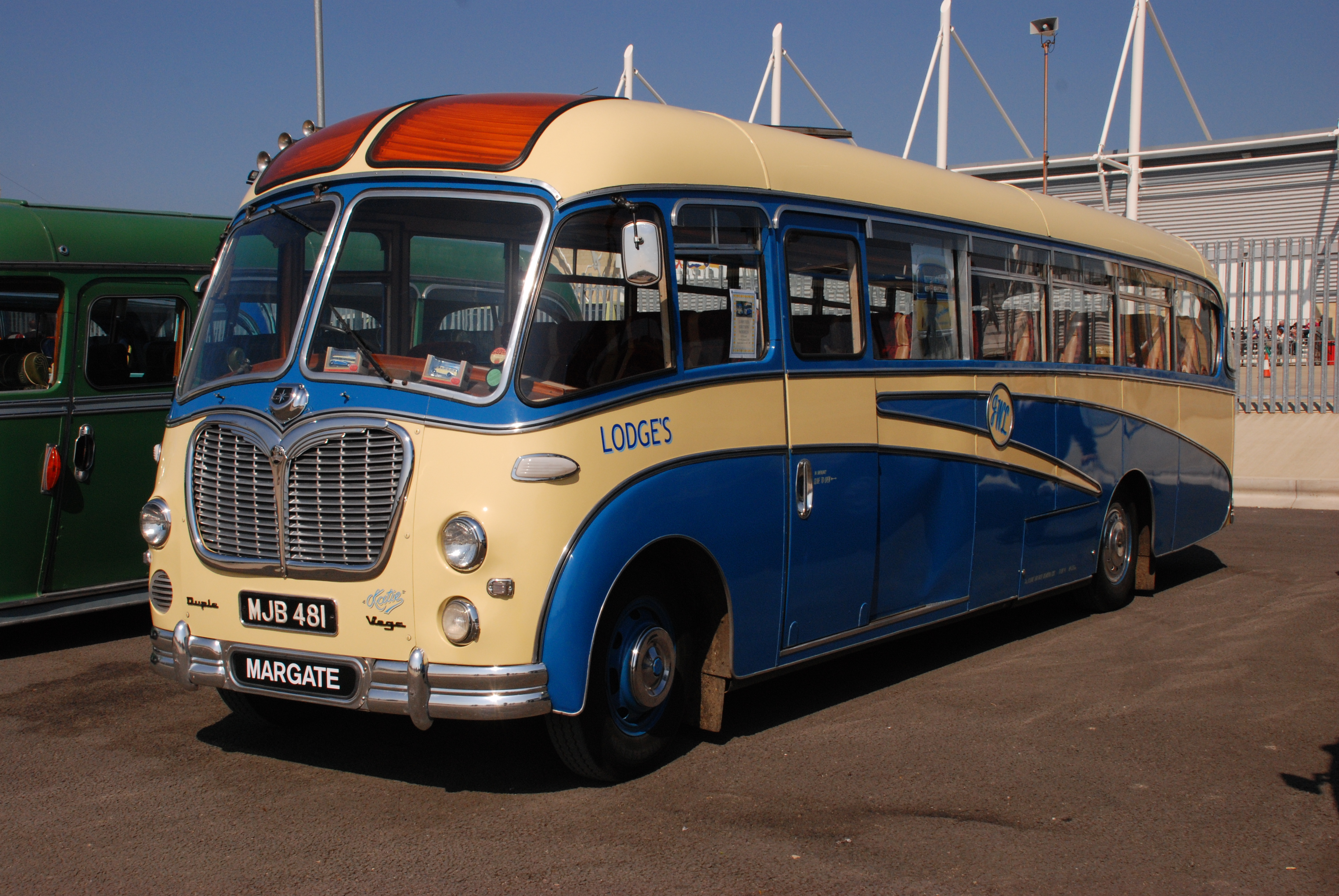
1956 / Duple Vega bodied Bedford SB

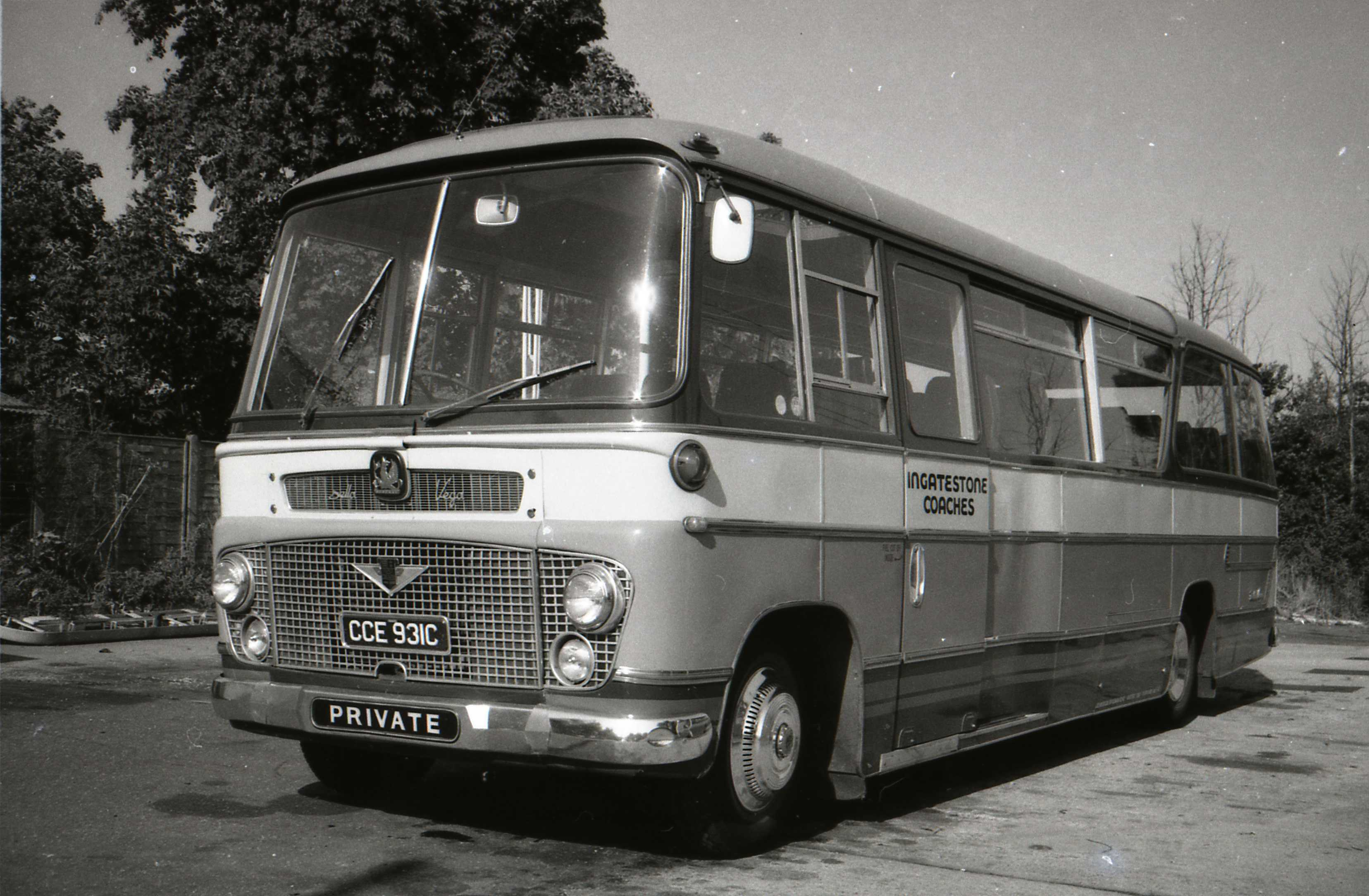
1965 Duple Bella Vega bodied Bedford SB

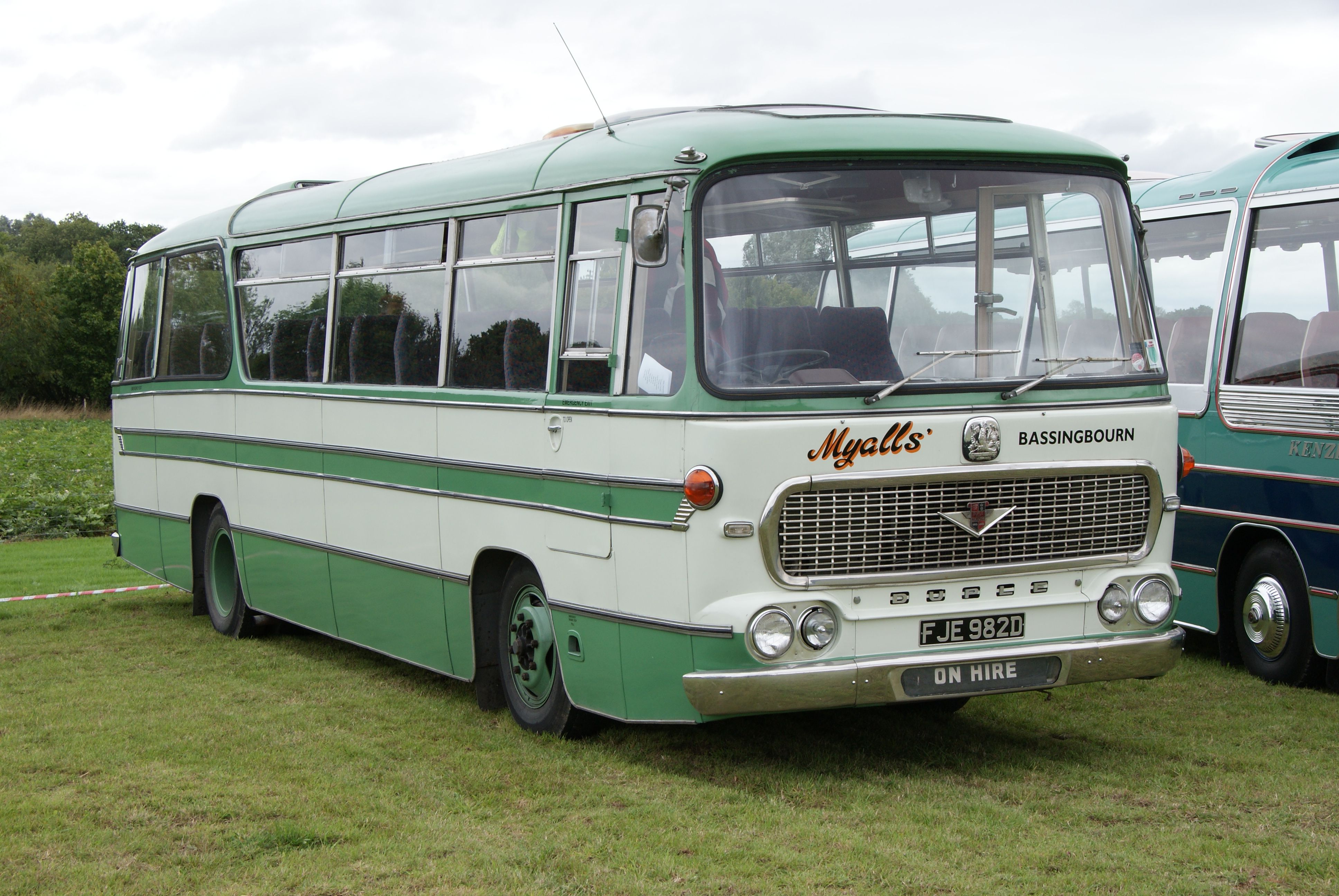
1966 Duple Bella Venture bodied Bedford VAM5

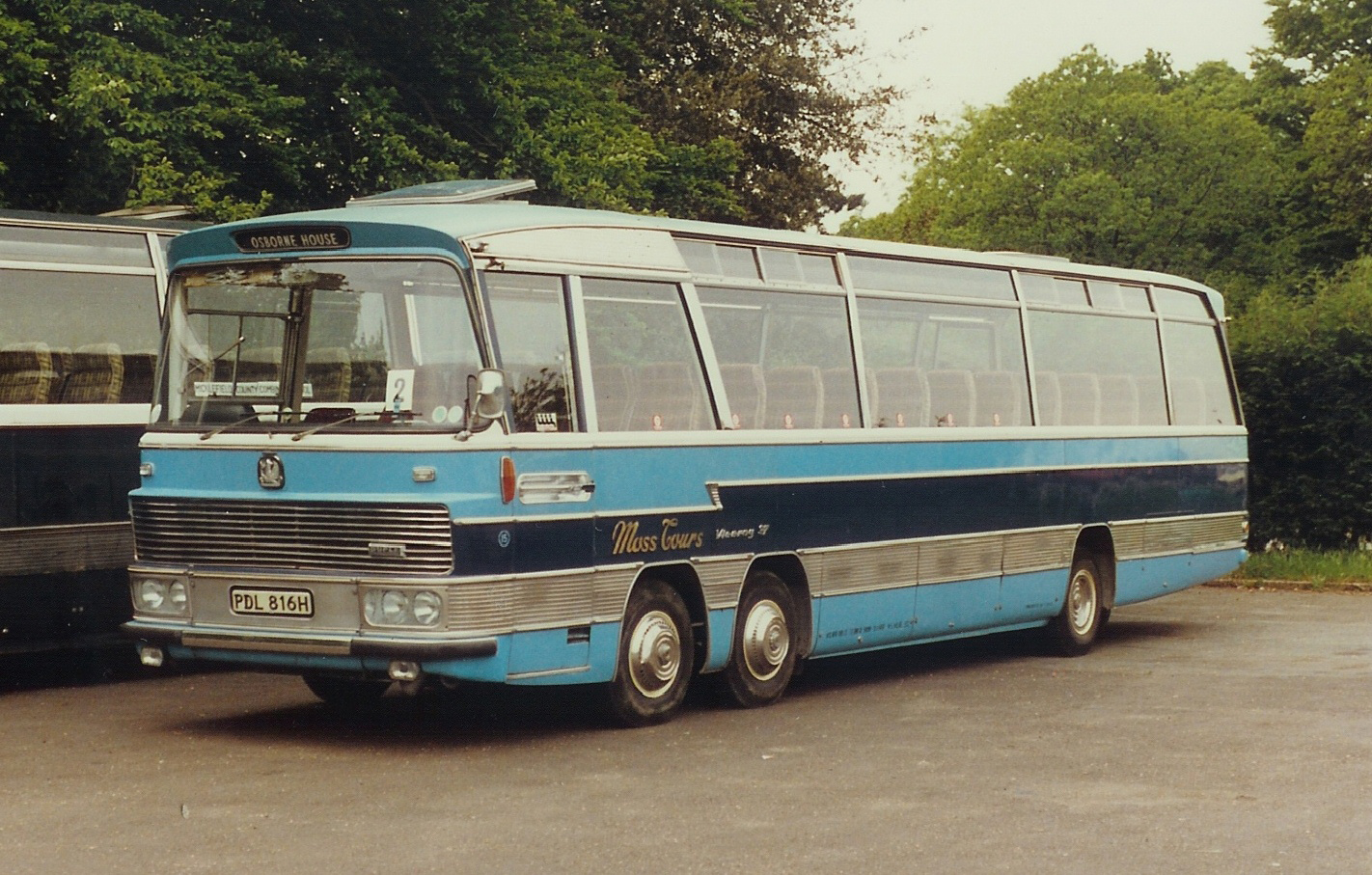
1970 Duple Viceroy 37 bodied Bedford VAL70

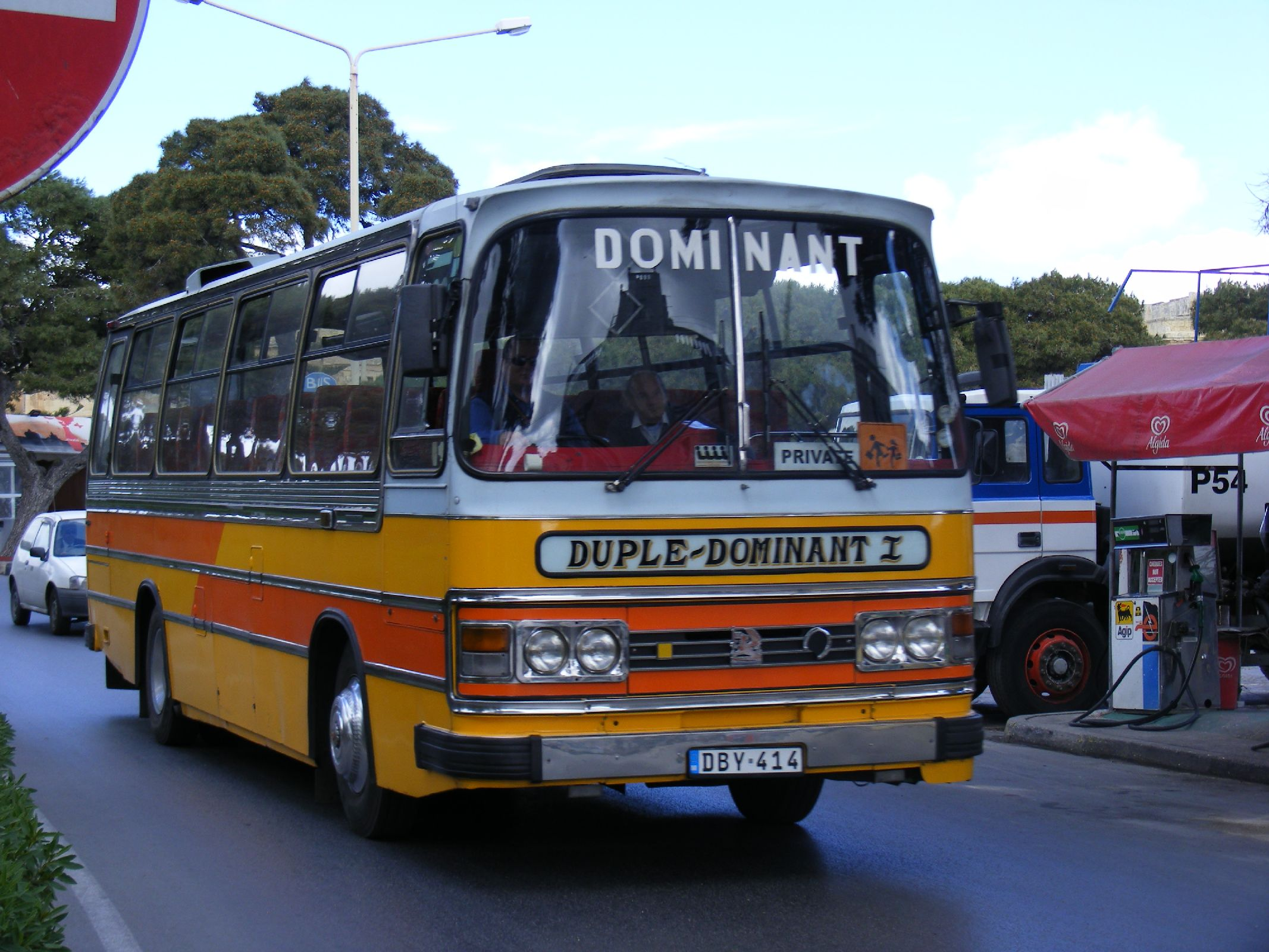
1977 Duple Dominant I bodied Bedford YLQ in Malta

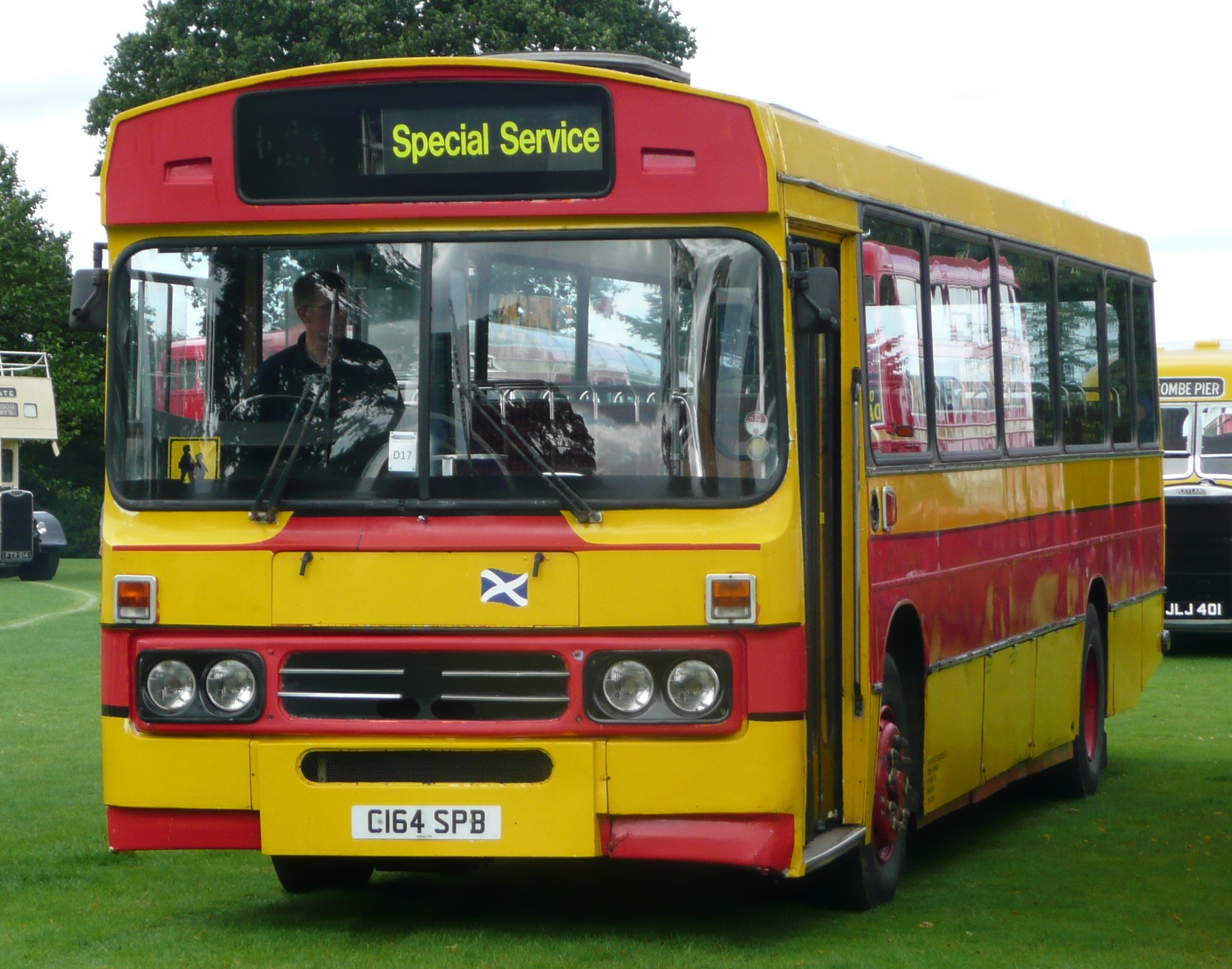
1985 Duple Dominant bodied Leyland Tiger

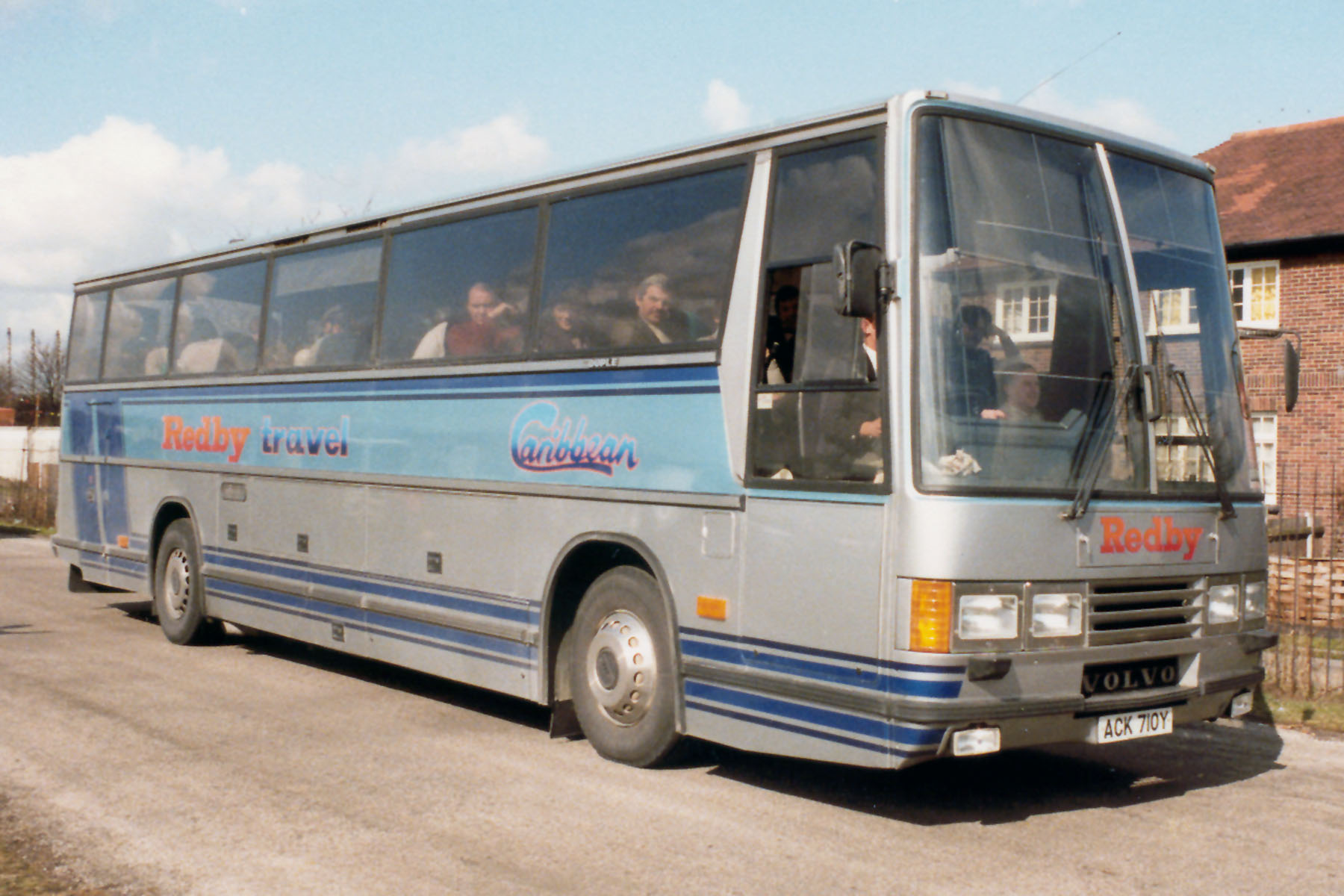
1983 Duple Caribbean bodied Volvo B10M

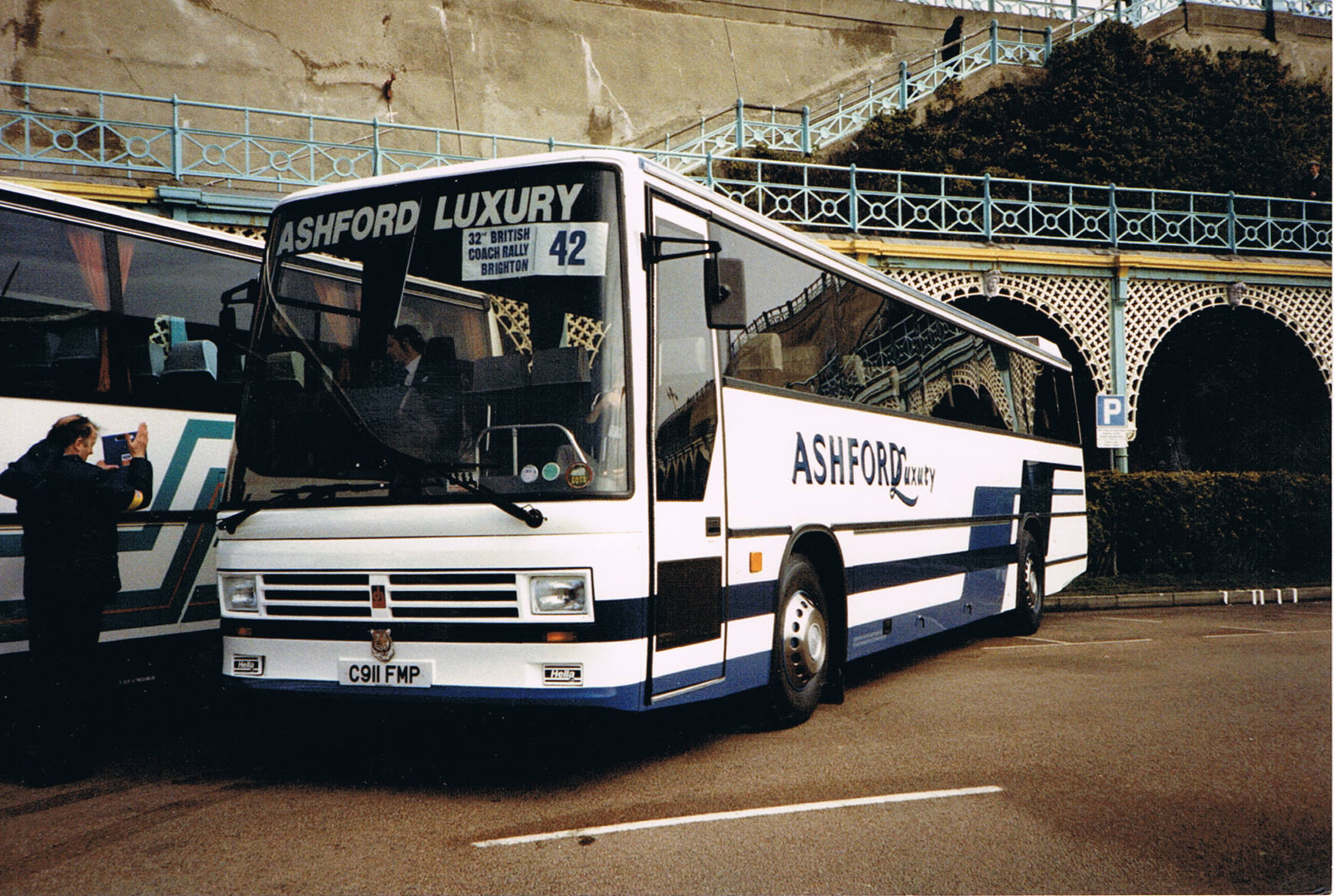
1986 Duple 320 bodied Leyland Tiger

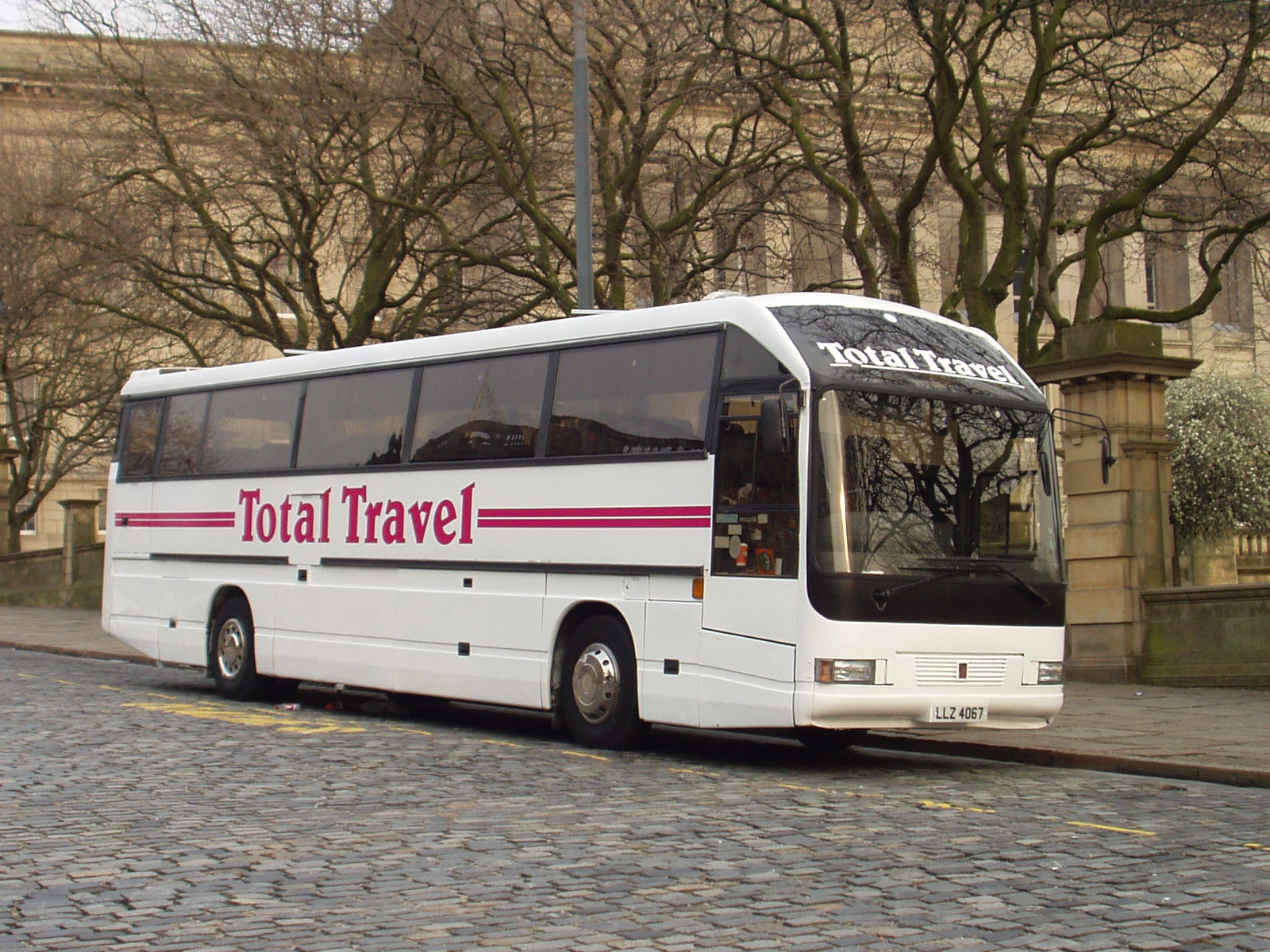
1988 Duple 425

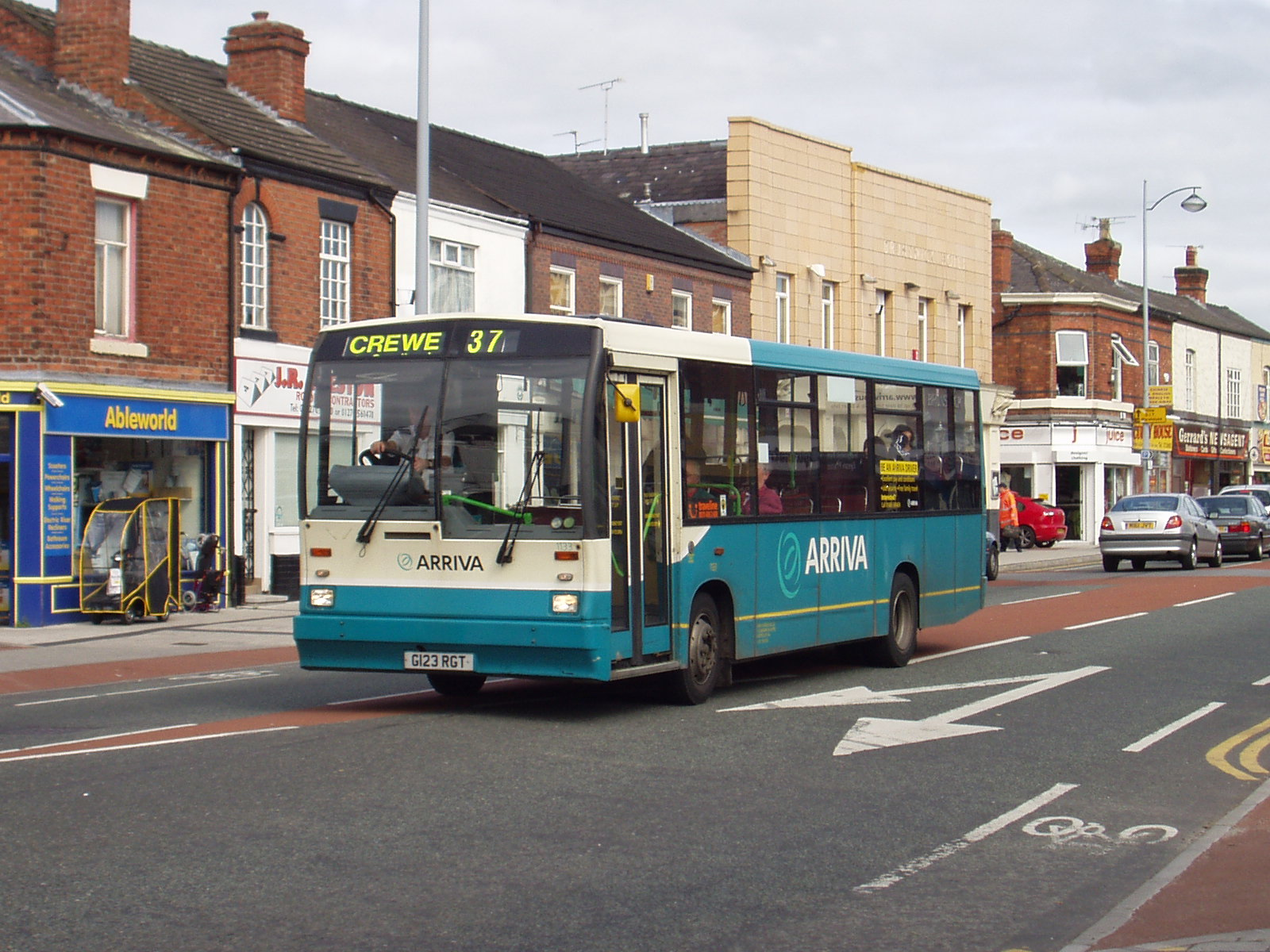
1990 Duple Dartline bodied Dennis Dart

The name Duple is intended to convey the principle of a single vehicle being suitable for a dual role, an idea Herbert White developed. The first vehicle of this type was called the Bifort. Subsequently, former military Ford Model Ts were fitted with the newly designed dual-purpose bodywork. The bodies looked like a small touring car, but could be transformed into a van by removing the decking at the rear of the car and fitting a van top. This type of vehicle had enormous appeal to the owners of small businesses, who were able to obtain a working vehicle and private car for little extra, and soon bodywork of this type was being produced in substantial numbers. The 'convertible' body, as it was known internally, was built on Morris Cowley and Oxford chassis as well as the Ford T; as well as the standard van top there was a pick-up and even a version with raising sides and slide-out display shelves for use in markets, production ceasing around the end of the 1920s although Duple continued to repair and service examples for many years afterward.

In 1926 a new factory was opened in Hendon to meet growing demand.

Coachwork had been built on occasions since the inception of the company, including a six-wheeled Lancia-Barton Charabanc. but in 1928 it was decided to make an effort to increase output of this body type substantially. As a result, the order book began to grow and within ten years the number of people employed had risen to around 800.

In 1928, Walter Ernest Brown, a former partner in the Strachan & Brown bodybuilding business, joined the firm, and he had a major influence on the company's future expansion.

Major clients of this period included the Great Western Railway, who ordered a number of bodies for its expanding bus fleet, and Elliott Brothers' Royal Blue fleet.

=== 1930s ===
By 1930, the total number of coach and bus bodies produced was 250, establishing Duple as an emerging bodybuilder of some stature, whose distinctive design features were able to influence national trends.

The depression of the 1930s coupled with the introduction of the 1930 Road Traffic Act brought about changes in the bodybuilding sector, which led to a stabilising of the transport industry, established operators feeling secure now that the threat of unregulated competition had been removed by the licensing system. Accordingly, there was a trend towards vehicles with higher standards of finish and more comfortable interiors.

In 1930, Duple received the largest single order to date, for 50 bodies to be fitted to the AEC Regal chassis for Green Line Coaches, the newly established express service arm of the London General Omnibus Company.

In August 1931, two Bedford passenger chassis (the 14-seat WHB and 20-seat WLB) were announced. Duple had built early bodies on the WLB chassis for the Vauxhall Motors (the parent company of Bedford), and was listed in publicity material as one of the four bodybuilders recommended for the WLB chassis. As demand for the type rose, Duple's ability to produce in quantity set them apart from their competitors, and soon Duple-bodied Bedford WLBs were in service around the country. The association with Bedford was to last over 50 years.

In 1932, Duple acquired the business of London Lorries who, despite the name, were heavily involved in the manufacture of coach bodies.

By the middle of the 1930s, Duple was widely regarded as a coachbuilder, although bus bodies were still produced in quite large numbers. An order was received from Vauxhall Motors for special sports tourer bodies on Vauxhall 14 hp light six chassis and a stand was taken at the 1933 London Motor Show to display them. They were advertised by Vauxhall up to 1935 and may have been Duple's last car bodies made in quantity, although they also bodied Canadian-assembled Buick 8-50 cars for General Motors in the UK. Also built in the 1930s was a special coupé on an Alvis speed 20 model for Lloyd Thompson of the Holdsworth Moquette company, a major supplier to Duple and many other coachbuilders.

Export business had been developed early, based mainly on the travels of the Duple directors, including W. E. Brown, who had already been to the United States and Canada and now embarked on a Mediterranean tour, taking in Greece, Syria and Egypt. Export orders were also received in quantity from East Africa and Argentina, and closer to home in Europe. This in part helped to compensate for the reduced demand for UK bodywork, which tended to be seasonal.

By 1934, the original site had become inadequate and 3½ acres of adjoining land were purchased for expansion. Although car body production was coming to an end, major contracts for the GPO were obtained during the 1930s, for telephone repair vans in the main, on either Morris Minor or larger Morris Commercial Chassis, although two specials were BLB444 of 1934 the blue streamlined van designed to publicise the air mail service, which was modelled as a Dinky Toy. and GPO1 which was a Morris Commercial Leader tractive unit coupled to a Brockhouse semi-trailer upon which Duple built a travelling post office for use at agricultural shows, race meetings and other major public events.

The late 1930s saw the era of the classic coach design, with operators becoming increasingly conscious of the appearance of their coaches. Many coach bodies were of individual design, but readily identifiable as Duple. The introduction of sloping pillars, curving roof- and waist-lines along with shaped mouldings on the side panels all contributed to a new 'aerodynamic' style that was increasing in popularity. Although coachwork continued to be Duple's main product, single-deck bus bodies formed a good part of the production from the mid-1930s, with one customer, Barton Transport, placing a bulk order for such bodies to be delivered over an extended period.

In 1936, Duple introduced the Vista design of bodywork, primarily for the Bedford WTB chassis. It had curved roof- and waist-lines, and featured a sliding roof as standard. In 1937 a revised design of the Vista, the Vista II, was introduced together with a new design - the Hendonian. Both of these remained in production until the end of the decade.

In 1939, Bedford introduced a new range of goods models, which included the 'O', with characteristic 'bullnose' grille. The passenger version was named the 'OB' and Duple modified the Hendonian body to fit the chassis, which at 14 ft 6 in, was longer than the WTB. With the advent of World War II, Bedford production was turned over to the war effort, with only 73 OB chassis produced, and it was not until after cessation of hostilities that the Bedford OB with Duple Vista bodywork was to become a familiar sight on British roads.

=== Wartime ===
During World War II, as a member of the London Aircraft Production Group, Duple built fuselages for the Halifax bomber, along with a variety of military products. Duple also built double-deck highbridge and lowbridge buses to utility specifications, and the only new single-deck vehicle to be produced from 1942 to 1945, the Bedford OWB.

=== Postwar expansion ===
In 1946 the name of the business was changed to Duple Motor Bodies Limited.

The first postwar production model to appear was the Duple Vista body on the Bedford OB chassis. The standard seating capacity soon became 29, although models with different capacities were still available. The Vista coachwork remained Duple's standard OB body until production of the OB chassis ceased in the early 1950s.

Deliveries of Duple bodywork on full-sized chassis (such as the AEC Regal) began in May 1946, and were known as the A-type, although its curved lines had their origin in the prewar period, so it was not strictly a new design. Before long the order book was filled for several years ahead. Postwar rebodying became common practice as new chassis were initially hard to obtain and Duple built many A-type bodies on different chassis that helped to make it, with its distinctive side 'flash', a familiar sight in postwar Britain. Alternative styles were available, all with alphabetic codes, such as the B-type and C-types, which differed in detail only and were regarded as 'dual-purpose' bodies, whilst the D-type was Duple's own design of bus body.

After the war, there was a move towards metal-framed bodies, partly because of their greater durability and partly because of a shortage of timber for traditional bodywork. Duple designed a metal-framed body (the Almet) for export models on the OB chassis, as well as producing a body design for the new SB chassis, then under development. By 1948, Duple had developed a metal-framed double-deck body, examples of which were delivered to the Red & White group and Scottish Motor Traction.

=== 1950s ===
In 1950, a range of full-fronted coach bodies named the 'Ambassador' was produced, but with the maximum permitted length for coaches increased to 30 ft and the maximum width to 8 ft, a series of new designs was prepared. Many were given names, such as the Roadmaster and Vega, all intended for use on specific chassis. The Roadmaster particularly was unlike anything Duple had previously produced, with its high, straight waistline and small windows. It earned the nickname 'Iron Duke' and was intended for underfloor engined chassis, hence the higher waistline. The Vega was intended for the new production model of the Bedford SB, and the bodywork featured a gently curving waistline typical of Duple.

The 1950s brought a difficult time for the bodybuilding industry: the end of the increased postwar demand led to a rapid decline in orders, and competition for the remaining ones became intense. Many of Duple's former customers were by then in the Tilling Group, which standardised on Bristol chassis and Eastern Coach Works bodywork. Disputes among union labour resulted in a 36-week strike that was catastrophic for Duple. It began to lose significant amounts of business to other companies and a move out of London was considered.

In 1952, Duple acquired Nudd Brothers & Lockyer Limited, based in Kegworth. The newly acquired firm was used to produce metal-framed bodies in the Duple standard range.

Further premises were acquired in Loughborough in 1955, and in 1956 the Kegworth and Loughborough factories were renamed Duple Motor Bodies (Midland) Limited. In 1958, the business of Willowbrook of Loughborough was acquired, although the business continued to operate under its own name for some time.

Throughout that period, Duple continued to produce new body designs: the Elizabethan, for underfloor-engined chassis, was introduced in 1953; the Britannia, based on the Elizabethan but with vertical pillars, was introduced in 1955, and the Loughborough-built Donington, for dual-purpose use, was added to the range in 1956. The designs for Bedford chassis had continued to be produced, now known as Super Vista (modified C series goods chassis) and Super Vega (SB).

=== Sixties Moves ===
The business of H. V. Burlingham, of Blackpool, best known for the 'Seagull' body of the 1950s, was taken over in August 1960, adding a northern arm to Duple's production. The Burlingham name was retained until 1962, when it was changed to Duple Motor Bodies (Northern) Limited.

Towards the end of 1961 Bedford introduced the VAS chassis and Duple produced a completely new design - the Bella Vista - for it. That year the maximum permitted length for coaches was increased to 36 ft and the maximum width to 8 ft 2½ ins, and Duple (Northern) designed and produced the Continental, with seats for up to 51 passengers. At the same time the Super Vega was replaced by the Bella Vega, using similar styling to the Bella Vista, and when Bedford announced the six-wheeled VAL in 1962, Duple introduced the Vega Major. For 1964, Duple introduced the Commander, initially built at Hendon but switched to Blackpool later, and in 1966 the Viceroy range replaced the Bella series on most Bedford or Ford chassis.

From 1968 Duple coach production was concentrated at Blackpool, and the company was renamed Duple Coachbuilders Limited. The Hendon factory finally closed in 1970. The Willowbrook subsidiary continued in business under its own name until it was sold in 1971.

=== Dominant 1970s ===
At the 1972 Commercial Motor Show, Duple introduced a new range of bodies called the Dominant, which were similar in appearance to the Plaxton Panorama Elite, already in production since 1968. The Plaxton Supreme range was introduced in 1974, and in response Duple introduced the Dominant II in 1976 with a restyled front and rear end by Michelotti of Turin. The style was cleaner than earlier models with rectangular headlamps in an integrated grille panel and a much deeper windscreen and driver's window. The Dominant and Supreme body styles were the ubiquitous British coach of the period, with very little competition other than small numbers from Willowbrook. The thought of importing coach bodies from abroad was only just being considered towards the end of the decade.

=== 1980s ===
The Transport Act 1980 saw the introduction of deregulation of coach services over 30 miles in length. A growing trend towards heavier-duty chassis that had been found more reliable for the high mileage and fast speeds of the motorway, caused the market for light coach chassis from Bedford and Ford to collapse in 1981. Duple's output fell from 1,000 bodies in 1976, to 800 in 1980 and to just over 500 in 1981, which resulted in a reduction in the workforce.

In 1980, the Dominant range was extended with the Dominant III and IV, with similar front ends to the Dominant II, but with reduced brightwork and bumpers. The Dominant III had high-set forward-angled trapezoid windows with thick pillars. Features of all four versions could be mixed and matched. In 1981, the Goldliner was introduced. This was similar to the Dominant, but with a higher floor to allow increased luggage accommodation and improved passenger sightseeing. The initial Goldliner styling featured a stepped roof behind the entrance door and was available in Goldliner II, III and IV designations, similar to those of the Dominant. In 1982, the Super Goldliner was introduced for a fleet of twelve rear-engined Dennis Falcon V coaches developed in conjunction with Dennis and the National Bus Company for high-speed Rapide service. The project was conceived and developed in a very short time, allowing inadequate development, and the resultant vehicles developed a reputation for poor reliability. The Super Goldliner styling, including a continuous flat roof in place of the stepped roof, was mixed and matched on subsequent Goldliner vehicles.

Imports of foreign makes, such as Neoplan, Bova, Van Hool and Jonckheere, began to make inroads into the UK market. To compete with them, two new body designs, the Laser and the Caribbean, were introduced in 1982. The Laser was a normal-floor body that resembled the Dominant, but with a rounder front and body-coloured front grille. The Caribbean was a high-floor design with a very square appearance. The Calypso was added in 1983 and was a low-floor version of the Caribbean on a Bova underframe. These new designs did little to halt the slide in production and in 1983, Duple output was just 340 bodies.

In June 1983, Duple was sold to the Hestair Group, which had already acquired the long established business of Dennis Brothers of Guildford. Duple was renamed Hestair Duple and the Laser and Caribbean were given a facelift to try to improve their popularity. In 1985, a new coach model, known as the 300-series, was introduced. A bus version of the 300 was introduced in 1987, replacing the successful Dominant bus that had continued in production after the coach version had been replaced. A new integral coach of exciting design, with Dennis running units, was added soon after. Known as the Duple 425 (its coefficient of drag), it was greeted with enthusiasm, but the close tie-in with Dennis as chassis maker made dealers of other chassis manufacturers reluctant to use Duple coachwork. The business continued to struggle, but the deregulation of bus services, in 1986, caused uncertainty amongst bus operators and, as a result, little investment in new vehicles was made. By 1988, Duple's output was just 250 bodies. However, at the October 1988 Motor Show, Dennis introduced the Dennis Dart, a midibus chassis that would go on to be one of Britain's most successful buses. Duple displayed a bus body for the chassis, the Dartline, that was based on the 300-series but with a distinctive front design, featuring a stepped windscreen and curved lower panel.

In November 1988, Hestair announced that they were selling the Dennis and Duple businesses to a management buyout team, operating under the name Trinity Holdings. The company was renamed Duple International. With declining coach sales, attempts were made to increase the sale of the bus bodywork, including plans for a design for the Scania N113. However, in July 1989, the decision was made to close down the Duple operation. The jigs for the Duple 300-series and the Duple 425 integral were sold to domestic rival Plaxton. Plaxton also bought Duple Services Ltd., the spares and repair business. The Duple body designs for the Dartline were sold to Carlyle Works of Birmingham. Thus ended 70 years of Duple Motor Bodies Limited.

== Company names in different times ==
- Duple Bodies & Motors Ltd 1919-1946
- Duple Motor Bodies Limited 1946-1968
  - Duple Motor Bodies (Midland) Limited
  - Duple Motor Bodies (Northern) Limited
- Duple Coachbuilders Limited 1968-1983
- Hestair Duple 1983-1989
- Trinity Holdings 1989

== Products ==
Early Duple bodies were not given individual model names. The practice of using model names began with the Vista in 1936 but names were not applied consistently across the coach range until the 1950s, and even in the late 1950s some low-volume coach models were not named. Bus bodywork was usually unnamed, until the Dominant Bus of 1974. Bodies given specific model names were as follows (all coach bodies unless specified):

=== bodies on lightweight chassis to 1972 ===
- Vista I/II/III (1936–39) on Bedford WTB
- Vista (1940 & 1946–51) on Bedford OB and rebodied OWB
- Hendonian (1937-39 & 1946–51) on Bedford WTB/OB and rebodied OWB, variant of Vista with straight waistline
- Luton (1939) bus body on Bedford WTB. Similar bodies built post-war were not named.
- Sportsman (1951–52) on Bedford OLAZ
- Vega / Super Vega / Alpine (1950–62) on Bedford SB. Super Vega was longer version introduced 1952. Alpine (1958) had a clear perspex roof.
- Corinthian (1954–62) / Yeoman (1959–62) on Commer Avenger and Ford Thames 570E respectively, essentially Vegas by another name for non-Bedford chassis. Similar bodies without any model name were built on Albion Victor and Leyland Comet, and as rebodies on older heavyweight AEC Regal, Crossley SD42, Daimler CVD6, Leyland Tiger and Maudslay Marathon chassis
- Super Vista (1957–61) on Bedford C5
- Firefly (1963–65) on Albion Victor, Bedford SB and Ford Thames 570E, Duple (Northern) design, successor to Burlingham Gannet
- Bella Vista (1962–66) on Bedford VAS
- Bella Vega (1963–69) / Trooper (1963–65) on Bedford SB and Ford Thames 570E respectively
- Vega Major (1963–66) on 36' three axle Bedford VAL
- Marauder (1964) / Mariner (1965–66) on Ford Thames 676E (1964–65) and R226 (1966), two-axle equivalent of Vega Major
- Bella Venture / Empress (1966) on Bedford VAM and Ford R192 respectively, shorter equivalent of Marauder/Mariner
- Viscount (1966–67) on Bedford VAM and Ford R192, equivalent of Commander for front-engined chassis
- Viceroy (1967–72) on Bedford VAL, VAM, YRQ and YRT, Ford R192 and R226 and Seddon Pennine 6, also available on heavyweight chassis in 1971–72
- Vista 25 (1967–73) on Bedford VAS
- Vega 31 (1970–73) on Bedford SB

=== bodies on heavyweight chassis to 1972 ===
- Airline (1936–37) full-front bodies on AEC Regal and Leyland Tiger
- Kenton (1939) on Dennis Lancet II
- post-war heavyweight range (1946–51) on various front-engined chassis, including A, B, C, and D types as follows:
- A-type (coach body, half cab with small canopy, curved waist and roof lines, sloping window pillars)
- B-type (dual-purpose body, half cab with full canopy, curved waist and roof lines, vertical window pillars)
- C-type (coach body, half cab with full canopy, straight waist but curved roof line, vertical window pillars)
- D-Type (bus body, half cab with full canopy, straight waist and roof lines, vertical window pillars)
- C1 (1950) non-standard bodies on BMMO C1 for Midland Red
- Ambassador (1951–53) on AEC Regal IV, Daimler Freeline and Leyland Royal Tiger
- Roadmaster (1951–53) on Guy Arab UF and Leyland Royal Tiger
- Coronation Ambassador (1953–54) on AEC Regal IV, Daimler Freeline, Dennis Lancet UF and Leyland Royal Tiger
- Elizabethan (1953–56) on AEC Reliance, Atkinson PL745H, Daimler Freeline, Guy Arab LUF, Leyland Tiger Cub, Seddon Mk.11 and Sentinel SLC/6/30
- Britannia (1956–62) on AEC Reliance, Leyland Leopard and Tiger Cub
- Donington (1956–60) on AEC Reliance and Leyland Tiger Cub, Duple (Midland) dual-purpose design, subsequently built by Willowbrook subsidiary
- Continental (1962–65) on AEC Reliance and Leyland Leopard, Duple (Northern) design, successor to Burlingham Seagull 70
- Alpine Continental (1963) on AEC Reliance and Leyland Leopard, large-windowed version of Duple (Northern) Continental
- Dragonfly (1963) on AEC Reliance and Leyland Leopard, full-sized equivalent of Duple (Northern) Firefly, last Duple body purpose-designed to have a centre entrance, only six built
- Commodore (1963–64) on AEC Reliance and Leyland Leopard
- Astrocoach (1964) one-off body on AEC Reliance, essentially a Commodore with much larger windows and quarterlights
- Commander (1964–70) on AEC Reliance, Bristol LH and RE, Daimler Roadliner and Leyland Leopard
- Viceroy (1971–72) on AEC Reliance and Leyland Leopard, following discontinuation of Commander

=== later models, 1972-89 ===
- Dominant (1972–85) coach bodies on AEC Reliance, Albion Viking, Bedford SB, VAS and Y-series, Bristol LH, DAF MB200, Ford R-series, Leyland Leopard and Tiger, Mercedes-Benz T2, Volvo B10M and B58
- Dominant Bus (1974–87) bus bodies on AEC Reliance, Bedford Y-series, Dennis Falcon and Lancet, Ford R-series, Leyland Cub, Leopard and Tiger, Volvo B10M and B58
- Goldliner (1975/76) two one-off bodies based on Dominant - a Volvo B58 to Swedish export specification in 1975 and a high-floor Bedford YMT in 1976
- Goldliner / Super Goldliner (1982–83) on Dennis Falcon, Leyland Tiger and Volvo B10M, high-floor version of Dominant
- Laser (1983–86) on Bedford Y-series, DAF MB200, Leyland Tiger and Volvo B10M
- Caribbean (1983–86) on Auwärter Neoplan N716, DAF MB200, Dennis Dorchester, Leyland Tiger and Volvo B10M. High floor contemporary of Laser
- Calypso (1983–84) semi-integral coach using Bova Europa running gear
- 425 (1984–89) integral coach using Dennis running gear, subsequently built by Plaxton
- 320 (1985–89) on Bedford Y-series, DAF MB200 and MB230, Dennis Javelin, Leyland Leopard and Tiger, Scania K93 and Volvo B10M. Subsequently, built by Plaxton as 321.
- 340 (1985–89) on DAF MB200, MB230 and SB2305, Leyland Tiger, Scania K93 and Volvo B10M. High floor equivalent of 320.
- 300 (1987–89) bus body on Dennis Javelin, Leyland Tiger and Volvo B10M
- Dartline (1989) bus body on Dennis Dart, subsequently built by Carlyle

== See also ==
- Duple Metsec
