= Marshall Master =

Minibus

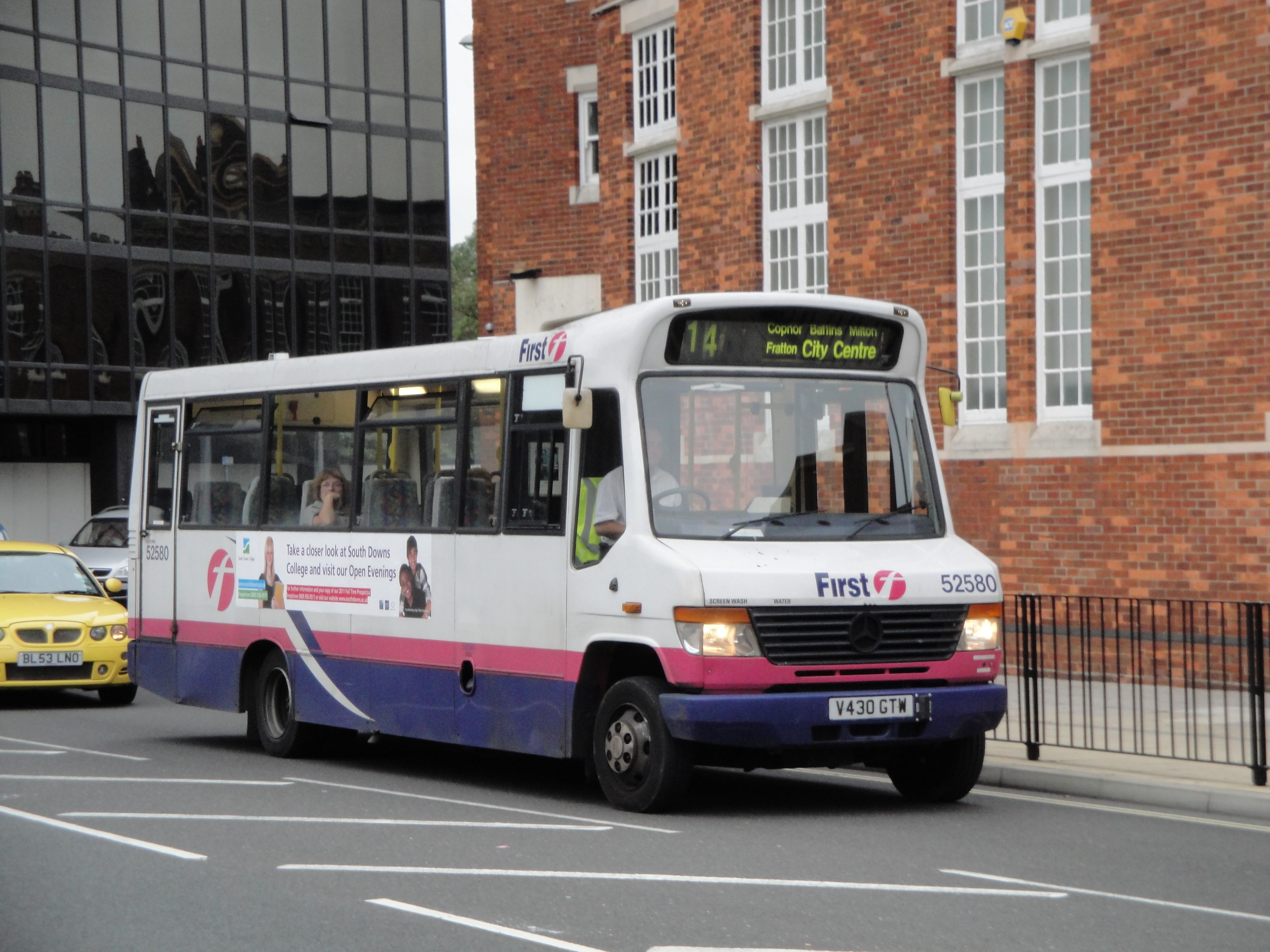

Overview
- Manufacturer: Marshall Bus

Body and chassis
- Doors: 1
- Floor type: Step entrance
- Chassis: Mercedes-Benz Vario

Powertrain
- Engine: Mercedes-Benz

The Marshall Master is a minibus body built on Mercedes-Benz Vario chassis by Marshall Bus of Cambridge, England between 1997 and 1999.

The Master was the successor to the C16 and C19 bodies on the Mercedes-Benz T2 chassis, and was essentially a minibus version of the Capital single-deck body, having a largely similar rear end, front destination display, and side window arrangement.

A total of 53 were built, the biggest customer being First Essex with 15. Coakley Bus of Motherwell took nine, while Dart Buses of Paisley bought five. The remainder were mostly sold to small operators.

== Gallery ==
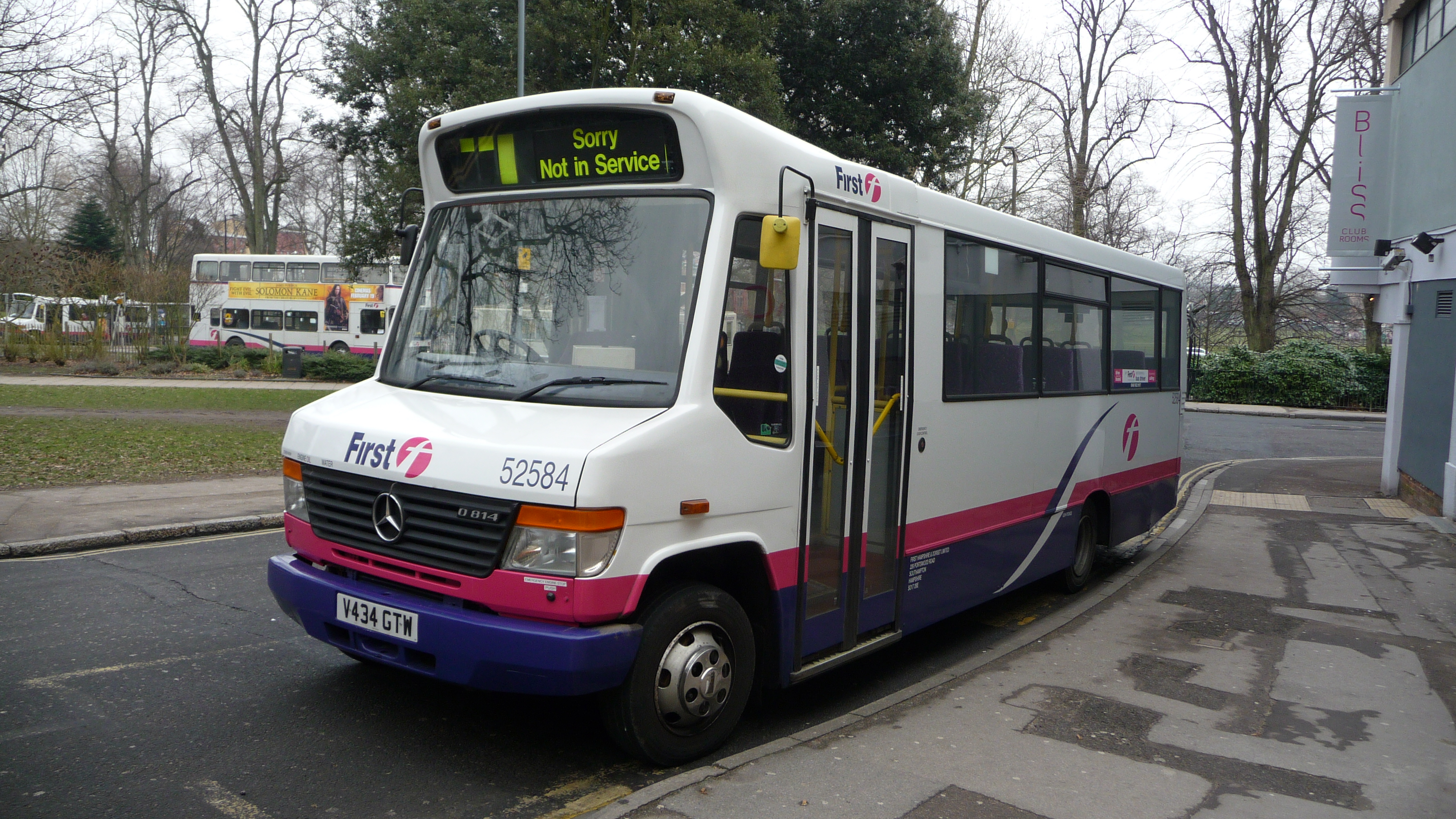
An ex-First Essex Marshall Master in service with First Hampshire & Dorset in 2010.

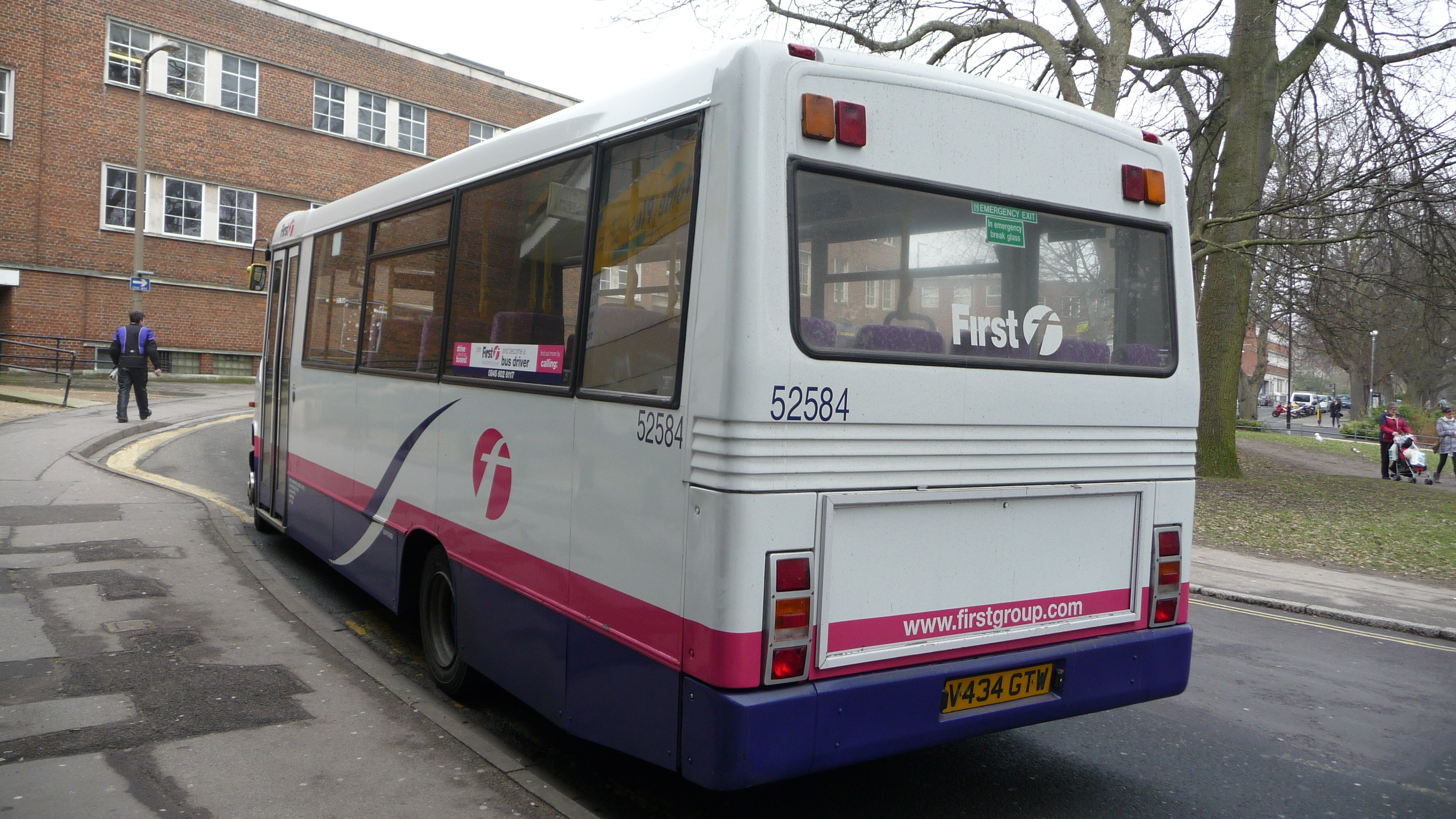
Rear view of the same bus, demonstrating the similarity of the Master's rear end to that of the Capital.

== See also ==
- List of buses
