= Duple Dartline =

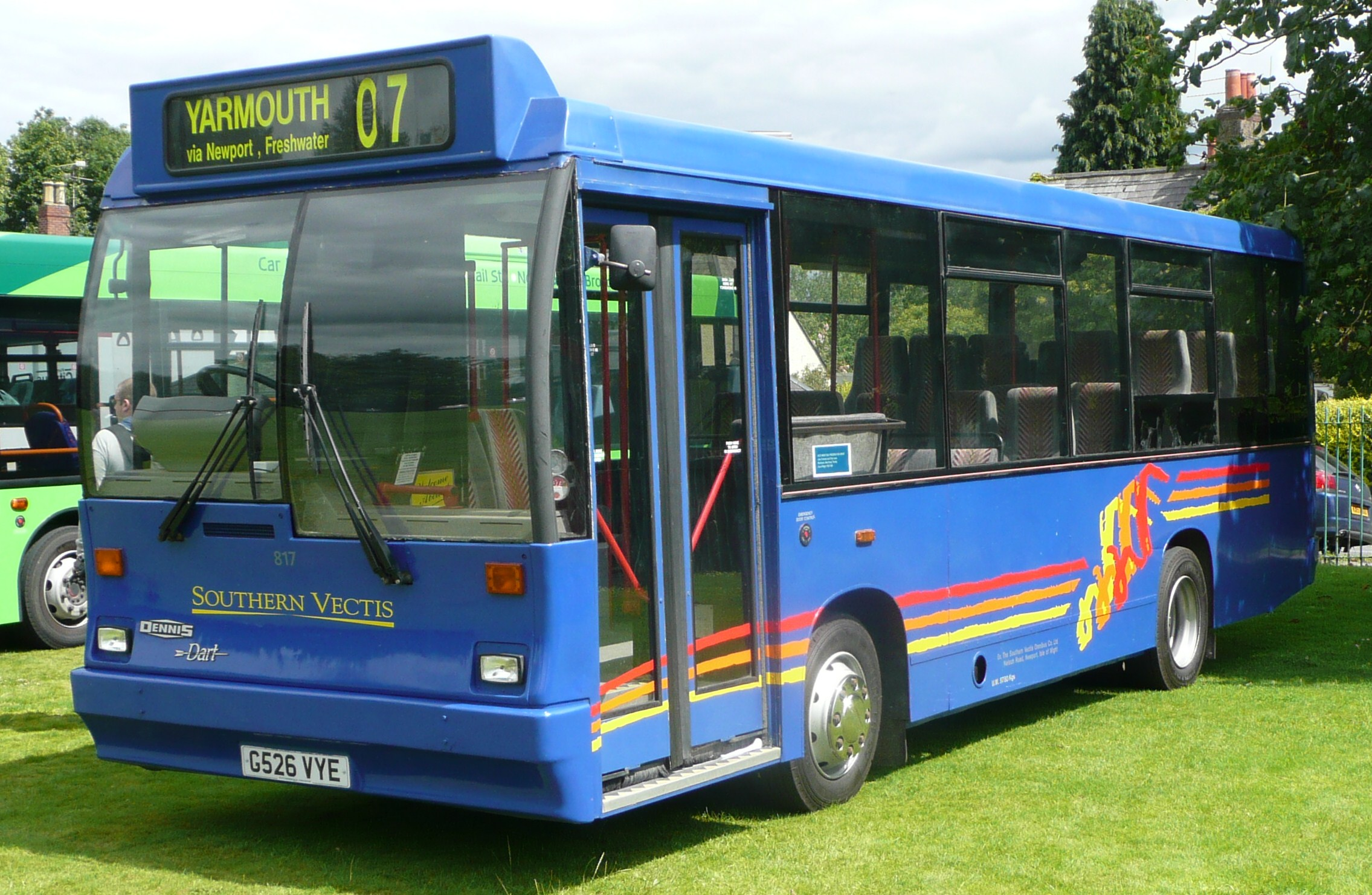
- Preserved Southern Vectis Duple Dartline bodied Dennis Dart in July 2008

Overview
- Manufacturer: Duple; Carlyle Works; Marshall Bus
- Production: 1989–1993
- Assembly: Blackpool (Duple); Edgbaston (Carlyle); Cambridge (Marshall)

Body and chassis
- Doors: 1
- Floor type: Step entrance
- Chassis: Dennis Dart

Powertrain
- Engine: Cummins B series
- Transmission: Allison AT545

Dimensions
- Length: 8.5m, 9.0m or 9.8m
- Width: 2.3m
- Height: 3.2m

Chronology
- Predecessor: Bedford JJL (Marshall models)
- Successor: Marshall C37

The Duple Dartline was a single-decker bus body built on the Dennis Dart chassis by three manufacturers - Duple Coachbuilders of Blackpool, Carlyle Works of Birmingham and Marshall Bus of Cambridge - between 1989 and 1993.

== Duple ==
The Dartline was unveiled by Duple at the 1988 British International Motor Show in Birmingham, along with the Dennis Dart chassis. Initially offered in just one length, 9 metres, its most distinctive feature was its curved, asymmetric windscreen covering the destination sign with an arched top.

Four pre-production vehicles were built at Duple's Blackpool factory in 1989, and were used as demonstrators. Of these, three were 9 metres long, while the fourth was for London Buses Limited and measured 8.5 metres.

Production commenced at the end of 1989, with 27 8.5-metre versions for the London United subsidiary of London Buses Limited, and 34 9-metre versions. Of the latter, 14 were for another London bus operator, R&I Tours, while five were for Southampton Citybus, three were for Great Yarmouth Transport, another three were for Rossendale Transport, and two were demonstrators for Hong Kong (and were eventually purchased by Kowloon Motor Bus).

With the closure of Duple, the Dartline design rights were sold to Carlyle Works, and many of these 61 buses were completed by the Birmingham manufacturer and badged accordingly, although they retained their Duple body numbers.

== Carlyle ==
A further 199 Dartlines were built in Birmingham between the middle of 1990 and the beginning of 1992, of which 140 were 8.5 metres (coded C25 by Carlyle), 16 were 9 metres (coded C26), and 43 were to a longer length, 9.8 metres (coded C27 and C28).

All the 8.5-metre versions were for London Buses Limited, going to its London United, Metroline, Selkent and South London subsidiaries. Of the 9-metre versions, 13 went to Warrington Borough Transport and one each to Southampton Citybus, Isle of Man Transport, and Yeomans Canyon Travel of Hereford.

Of the 22 C27-coded 9.8-metre versions, eight were ordered by London Country North West and delivered after that company's takeover by Luton & District, while the remaining 14 went to numerous small operators. Finally, all but one of the 21 C28-coded 9.8-metre versions went to China Motor Bus in Hong Kong.

== Marshall ==
Carlyle closed in early 1992, and the rights to all of its designs, including the Dartline, passed to Marshall Bus. Marshall was trying to enter the midibus market since 1985, when they bought the design tools and rights for the Bedford JJL, but to no success, due to low market demand. The Cambridge manufacturer built a final five Dartlines, all to the 9.8-metre length and coded C27, in late 1992 and early 1993, of which two went to Mayne Coaches of Manchester and one to Epsom Coaches. Total Dartline production was thus 269, including the four pre-production vehicles of 1989. In late 1993, Marshall redesigned the Dartline as the C37, with a symmetrical windscreen and a more substantial front bumper.
