= Marshall Capital =

Single decker bus bodywork

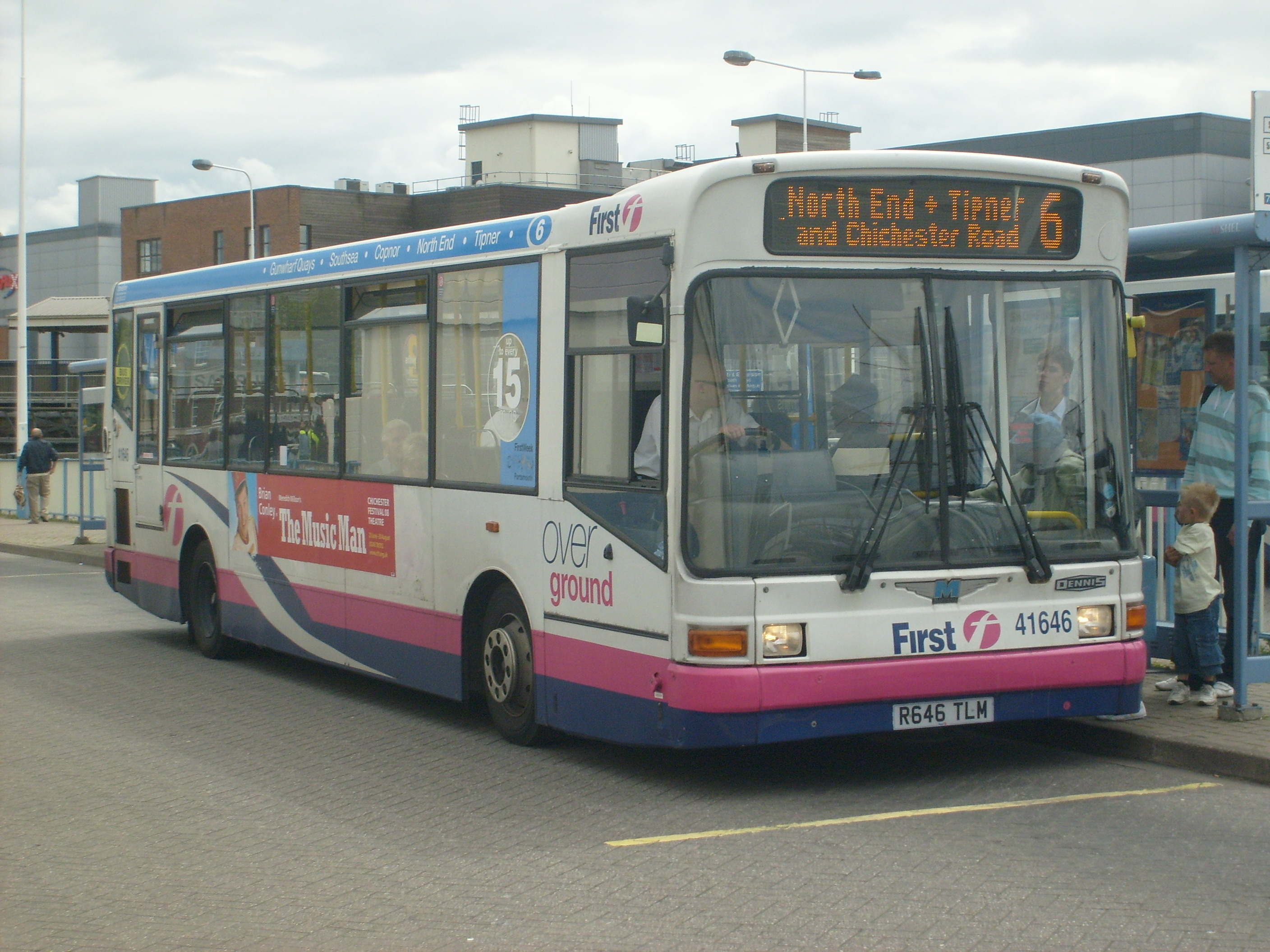
- First Hampshire & Dorset Marshall Capital bodied Dennis Dart SLF in Portsmouth in July 2008

Overview
- Manufacturer: Marshall Bus
- Production: 1996–2003
- Assembly: Cambridge

Body and chassis
- Doors: 1 or 2
- Floor type: Low-floor/Step-entrance
- Chassis: Dennis Dart SLF (C39); Integral (Minibus); Iveco Eurorider (C43; Euro); MAN 11.220 (C43)

Powertrain
- Engine: Cummins B Series/ISBe; MAN
- Capacity: 22–51 seated

Chronology
- Predecessor: Marshall C37
- Successor: MCV Stirling

The Marshall Capital (later sold as the MCV Capital) was a single-decker bus body built originally by Marshall Bus between 1996 and 2002, and later by MCV Bus & Coach between 2002 and 2003. Initially launched on the step-entrance MAN 11.220 and then Iveco Eurorider chassis, the Capital found greater success after being launched on the low-floor Dennis Dart SLF chassis from 1997. Marshall also produced a related, integral midibus, known as the Marshall Minibus, between 1996 and 1998.

The vast majority of Capitals – more than 800 examples – were bodied on the Dennis Dart SLF chassis. Key design features of the Capital include the double-curvature windscreen, arched top with a separately mounted destination display, and peaked roof dome.

Production of the Capital passed to MCV in 2002 after Marshall entered administration. In 2003, when the newly formed TransBus International decided not to supply Dart SLF chassis to MCV, the Capital was replaced by the MCV Stirling body on MAN chassis.

== Variants ==
=== Marshall C43 ===
Developed from the Marshall C37, the step-entrance Marshall C43 was the first variant of the Capital to be launched in 1996, based on high-floor MAN 11.220 chassis as with its predecessor. R&I Tours of London (later taken over by MTL London) took delivery of the first C43 in April 1996, and between them R&I and MTL were the largest customers for the variant, taking delivery of 24 examples up until January 1997. Dart Buses of Paisley were the second-largest customer, ordering six C43s, including the final example to be produced in January 1999. Two C43s were purchased by Shalder of Scalloway, and one by Thamesdown Transport.

In 1998, an experimental version of the step-entrance C43 Capital body, known as the Marshall Euro, was launched on Iveco Eurorider 391E chassis, which at the time had previously only been available in the United Kingdom market as a coach chassis. The Euro was much longer than other variants of the Capital, offering a seating capacity of up to 51. However, the unusual Iveco/Marshall full-size high-floor bus combination proved unsuccessful, and only three Euros were produced; one bus for Whitelaw of Stonehouse, and two as custom-built mobile treatment centres for St John Ambulance.

=== Marshall C39 ===
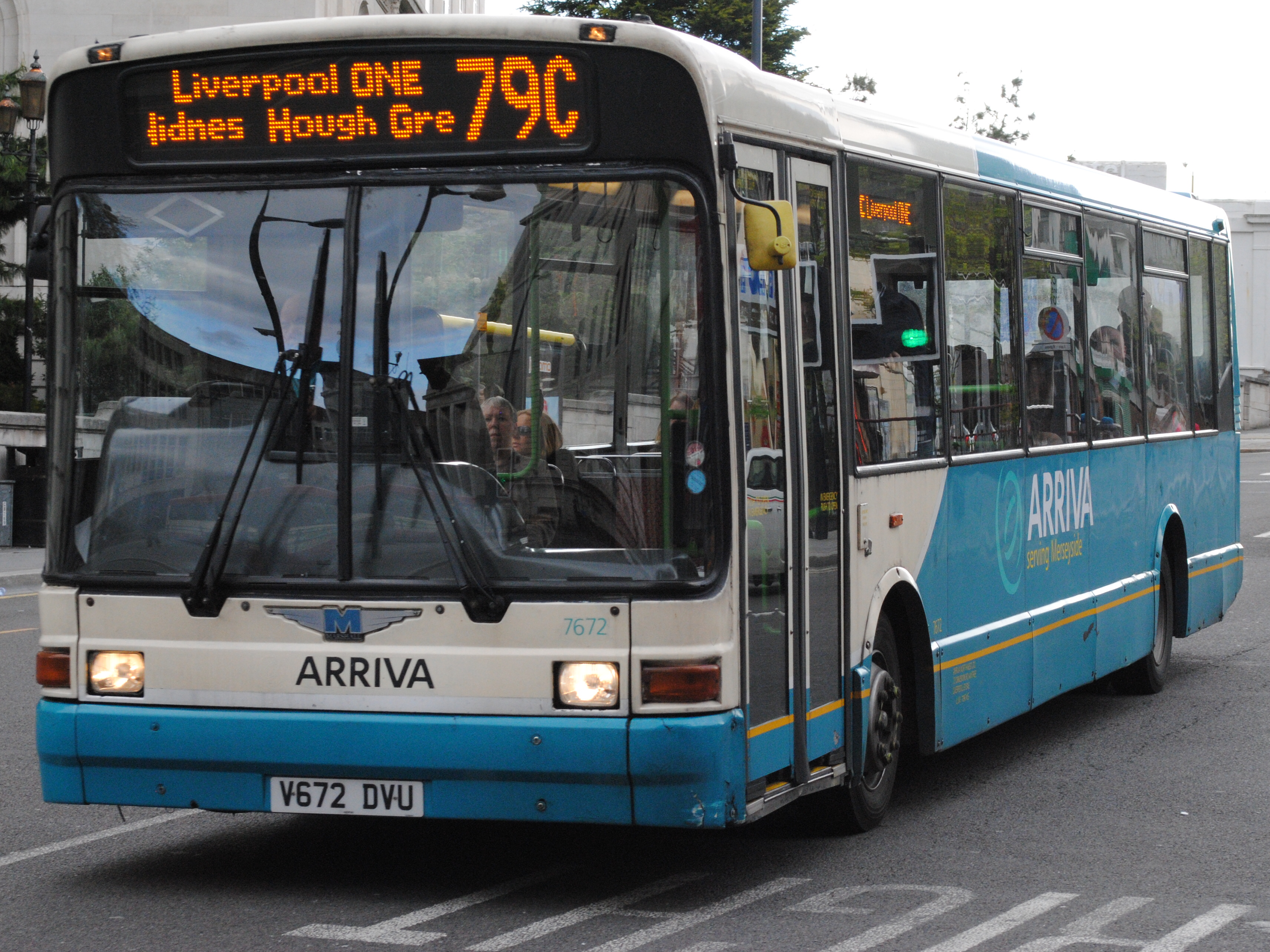
Arriva North West Marshall Capital C39 bodied Dennis Dart in Liverpool in May 2013

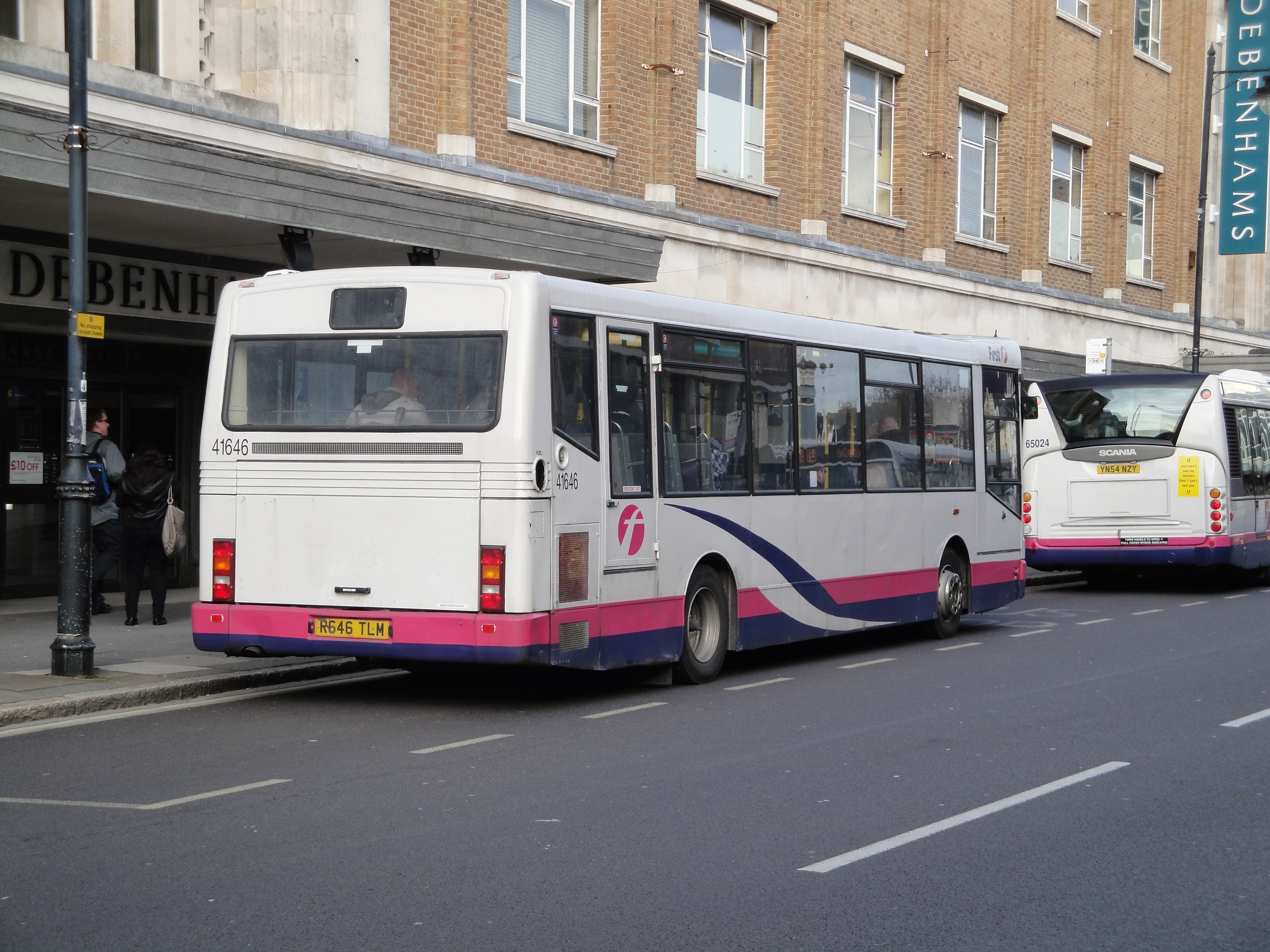
First Hampshire & Dorset Marshall Capital bodied Dennis Dart SLF in Portsmouth in March 2010

The low-floor Marshall C39, marketed as the Marshall Capital, was first launched in October 1995 initially as the body of an integral midibus product named the Marshall Minibus. The Minibus was a pioneering design as one of the UK's first low-floor midibuses, offered at a length of 8.5 metres (28 ft) and seating a maximum of 30 passengers alongside 12 standing passengers, with options for a wheelchair bay also offered. The Minibus had an entrance step height of 320 millimetres (13 in), capable of lowering to 250 millimetres (9.8 in) with a kneeling suspension, and the interior floor remained flat until the rear axle, where two steps led to the rear seats of the bus. The Minibus was powered by a Cummins B Series engine, and came fitted with an Allison AT542 four-speed automatic transmission as standard.

The Marshall Minibus, ultimately, was considered to be a failure due to low sales and poor reliability, with only 36 Minibuses sold throughout its production run, the first two of which entered service with Chester City Transport in September 1996. London General placed the first sizeable order for the Minibus, with 15 examples delivered between September 1996 and January 1997. This was followed by a slightly larger order from CentreWest for 16 examples, delivered between November 1997 and July 1998. By 1999, these London operators had begun returning their Minibuses to Marshall or selling them to other operators. The final two Minibuses were not produced until May 2001, entering service with Avon Buses.

The C39 body would later be launched on the Dennis Dart SLF chassis in 1997. Between 1997 and 2002, 846 C39 Capitals were produced, making it by far the most successful variant of the Capital and one of the most successful buses in the United Kingdom market at the turn of the millennium. The most significant customer for the C39 on the Dart SLF chassis was First London, who purchased more than 400 for its CentreWest, Capital, Ealing Buses, and London Buslines fleets. Other London operators of C39-bodied Dennis Dart SLFs included London Central and London General, the latter purchasing five as replacements for their Minibuses, as well as MTL, who purchased 76 C39s for its MTL London operations.

Outside of London, MTL purchased 75 C39s for its core MTL North fleet on Merseyside, while other notable customers included Halton Transport, Warrington Borough Transport, and Isle of Man Transport. The final Marshall-bodied C39 entered service with First Capital in September 2002.

=== MCV Capital ===
When Marshall Bus entered administration in late 2002, MCV Bus & Coach bought the design for the C39 Capital body and production continued as the MCV Capital. However, only five MCV Capitals were produced for Warrington Borough Transport in early 2003 before TransBus International decided to cease supplying Dart SLF chassis to MCV. The Capital was succeeded by the MCV Stirling on MAN chassis in late 2003.
