= Marshall C37 =

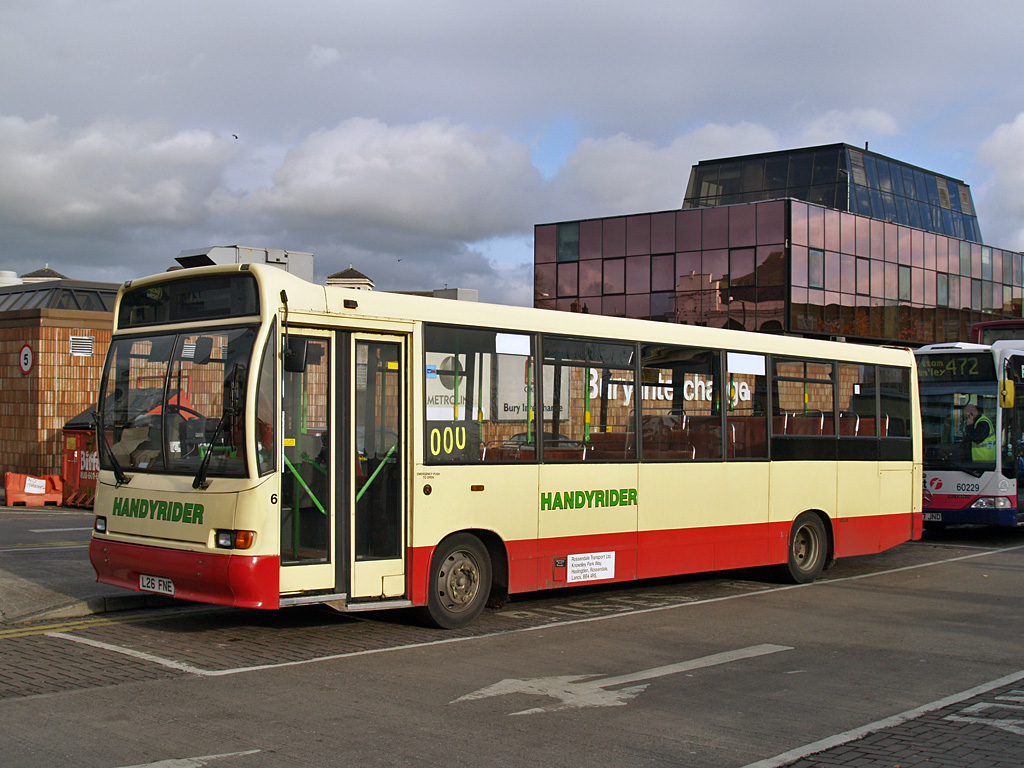
- Rossendale Transport Marshall C37 bodied Dennis Dart at Bury Interchange in November 2008

Overview
- Manufacturer: Marshall Bus
- Production: 1993–1997

Body and chassis
- Doors: 1 or 2
- Floor type: Step-entrance
- Chassis: Dennis Dart; MAN 11.220

Powertrain
- Engine: Cummins B Series (Dennis Dart)
- Capacity: 36 to 41 seated

Dimensions
- Length: 8.8 to 9.9 m (28 ft 10 in to 32 ft 6 in)
- Width: 2.5 m (8 ft 2 in)
- Height: 3.0 m (9 ft 10 in)

Chronology
- Predecessor: Duple Dartline
- Successor: Marshall Capital

The Marshall C37 was a step-entrance midibus body introduced in 1993 on the Dennis Dart chassis, the body was also able to be fitted to the MAN 11.220 chassis. About 140 were produced. Brighton & Hove and Oxford Bus Company purchased 20 each while China Motor Bus purchased eight for use on express services on Hong Kong Island, with air conditioning and various other options as standard.

A common feature is that it was fitted with the wrap-around windscreen with arched top with a separately mounted destination indicator for most of the buses. Production stopped in 1997 when it was replaced by the low floor Marshall Capital.
