= Carlyle Works =

Coachbuilder in Birmingham, UK

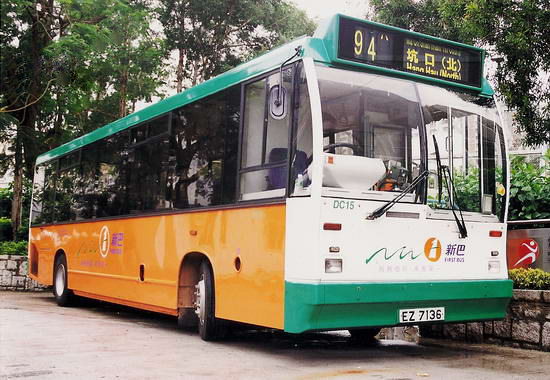
- New World First Bus Carlyle Works bodied Dennis Dart
- Founded: 1920
- Founder: Midland Red
- Defunct: 1992
- Headquarters: Carlyle Road, Edgbaston
- Products: Bus and coach bodywork

Carlyle Works was an English builder of bus and coach bodywork based in Edgbaston.

== History ==
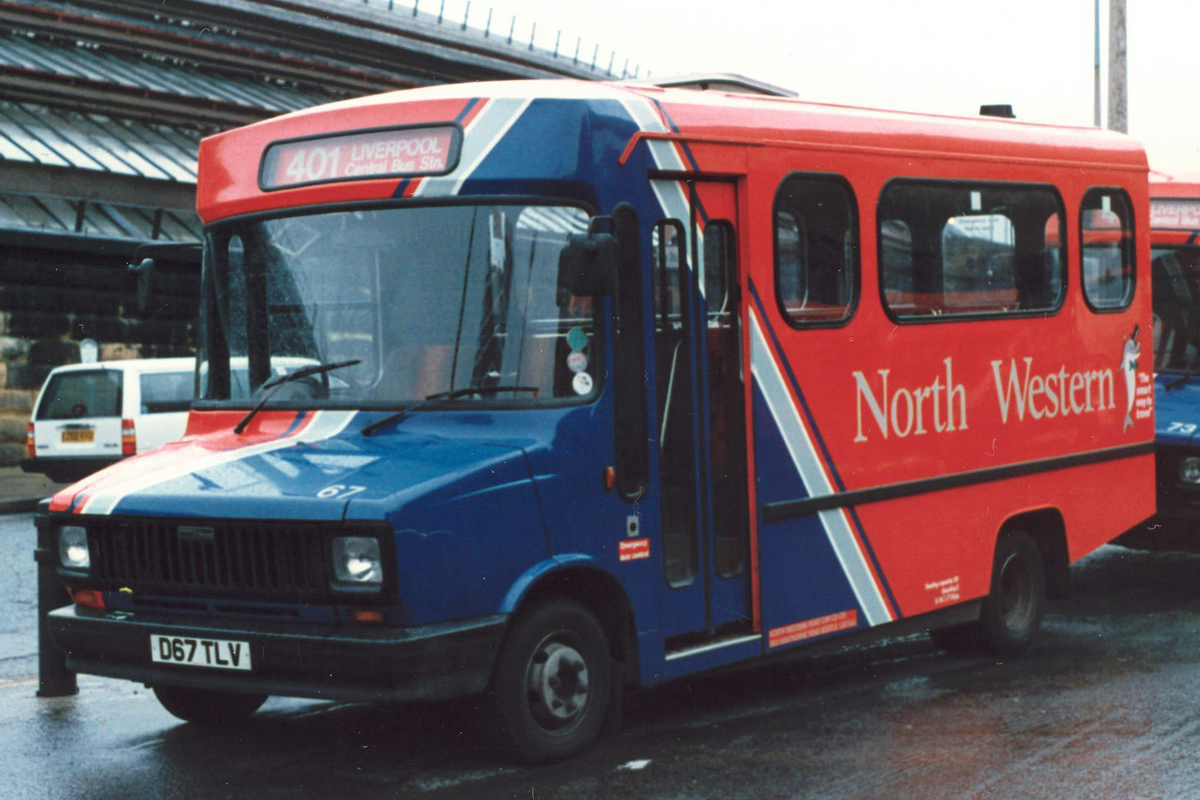
North Western Carlyle Works bodied Freight Rover

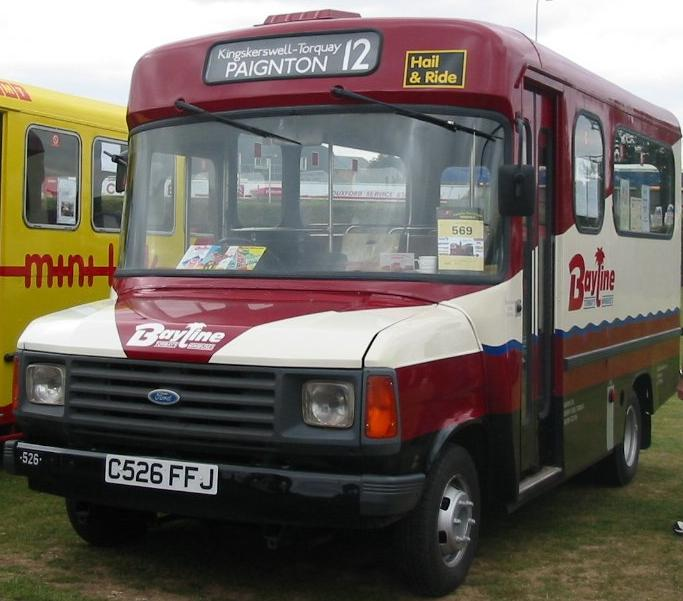
Preserved Bayline Carlyle Works bodied Ford Transit

In 1920, the Birmingham & Midland Motor Omnibus Company established a bus repair facility on land adjoining Rotton Park Reservoir. It initially performed repair work before chassis construction commenced in 1925. The eight-acre site was redeveloped over a five-year period from 1949. It derived its name from its address, Carlyle Road.

The company was famous for building its own buses and coaches, under the BMMO name. These buses were typically very innovative and were the first to introduce many advanced features. When the development and production of its own vehicles became prohibitive in the late 1960s the central works continued to provide heavy engineering services for the company. On 1 January 1969, Midland Red became part of the National Bus Company, and Carlyle Works provided engineering services for other National Bus Company operators. These services included major vehicle modifications and adaptations.

In the mid-1980s, minibuses became very popular for operators, allowing them to provide higher frequency service on routes that could serve areas larger vehicles could not access. Carlyle developed a range of bodywork for minibuses, notably Ford Transit conversions.

On 5 September 1981, Midland Red was divided into five operating companies with the Carlyle Works retained to provide engineering support. On 5 March 1987, Carlyle Works became the 22nd National Bus Company subsidiary to be privatised. It was purchased by Frontsource Limited, a company set up by Robert Beattie to purchase eight former National Bus Company engineering companies.

Carlyle set about building upon its minibus expertise, and developed bodywork for the Freight Rover chassis. These sold well, especially to former NBC operators. Designs for Iveco and Mercedes Benz 700 and 800 series vehicles followed.

In 1989, the body designs for the Duple Dartline were acquired from Trinity Holdings. This body was adapted for the Dennis Dart and was available in 8.5m, 9.0m and 9.8m lengths. Carlyle built 140 of an order for the 8.5m vehicles from London Transport. Warrington Borough Transport bought most (13) of the 9.0m versions. The 9.8m version was bought by China Motor Bus (later sold to New World First Bus) and Luton & District. Small numbers of each were bought by other independent operators.

New orders became increasingly hard to find, as the minibus vogue had ended and competing bodywork for the Dennis Dart was proving more popular. In October 1991, Carlyle Works was placed in receivership and closed. The rights to the Dartline were sold to bodybuilder Marshall Bus.
