= Marshall Bus =

English bus body manufacturer

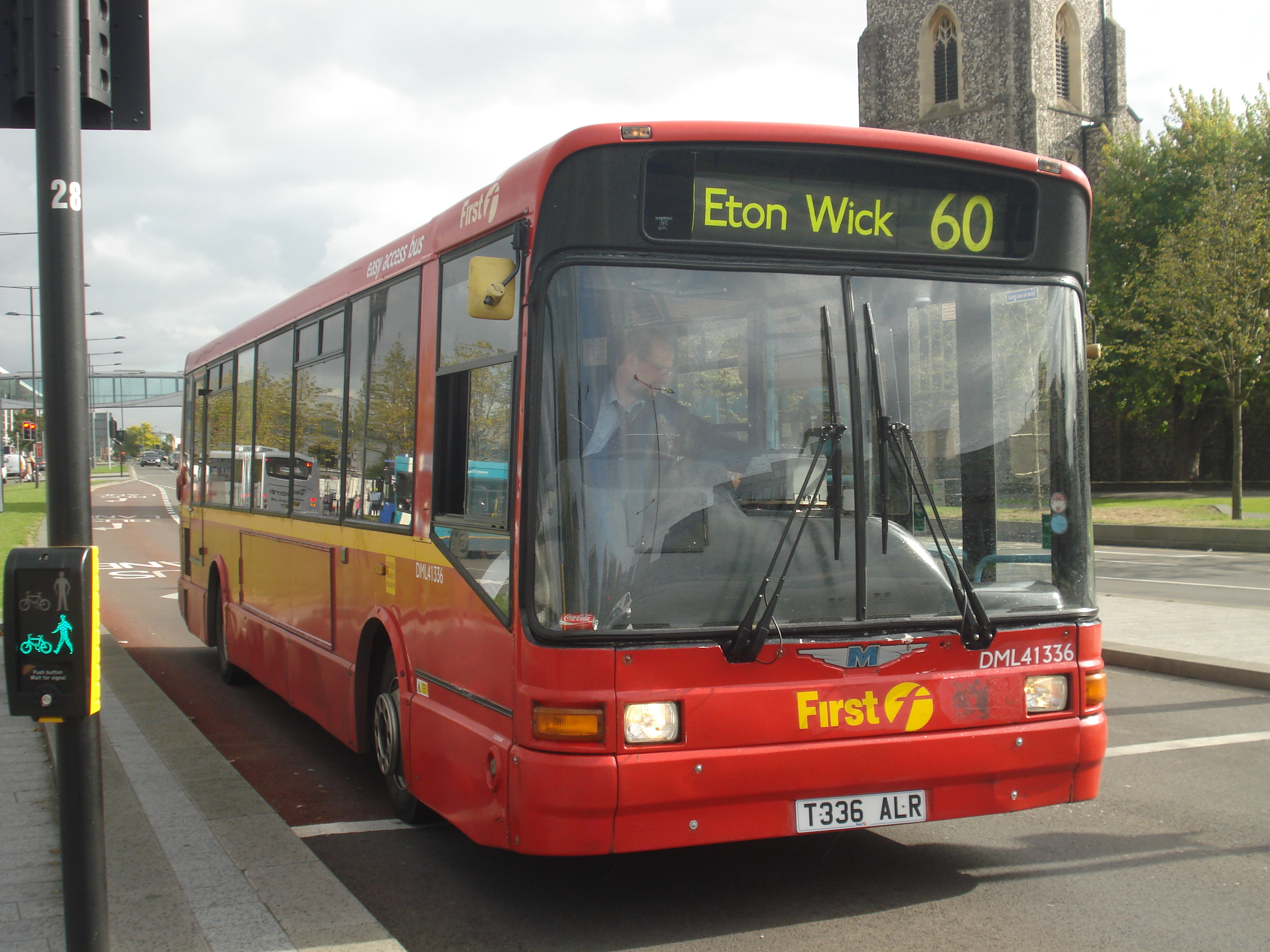
- First Beeline Marshall Capital bodied Dennis Dart in Slough in 2013
- Founded: 1940s
- Defunct: 2002
- Fate: Administration
- Successor: MCV Bus and Coach
- Headquarters: Cambridge
- Products: Bus and coach bodies

Marshall Bus was an English builder of bus and coach bodies based in Cambridge. It was owned by the Marshall Group until sold in a management buyout in 2001.

== History ==
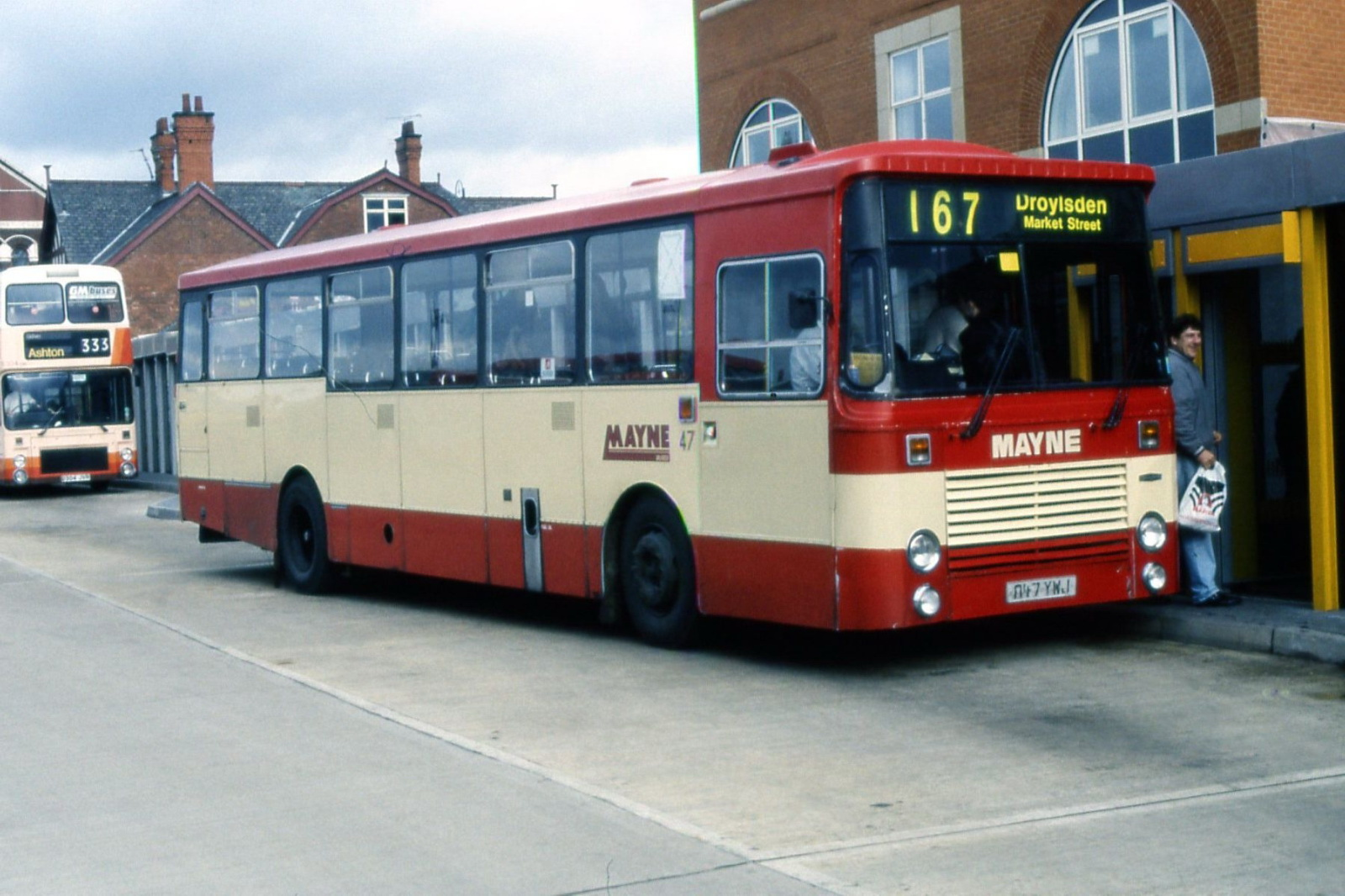
Mayne Coaches Camair 80 bodied Dennis Falcon

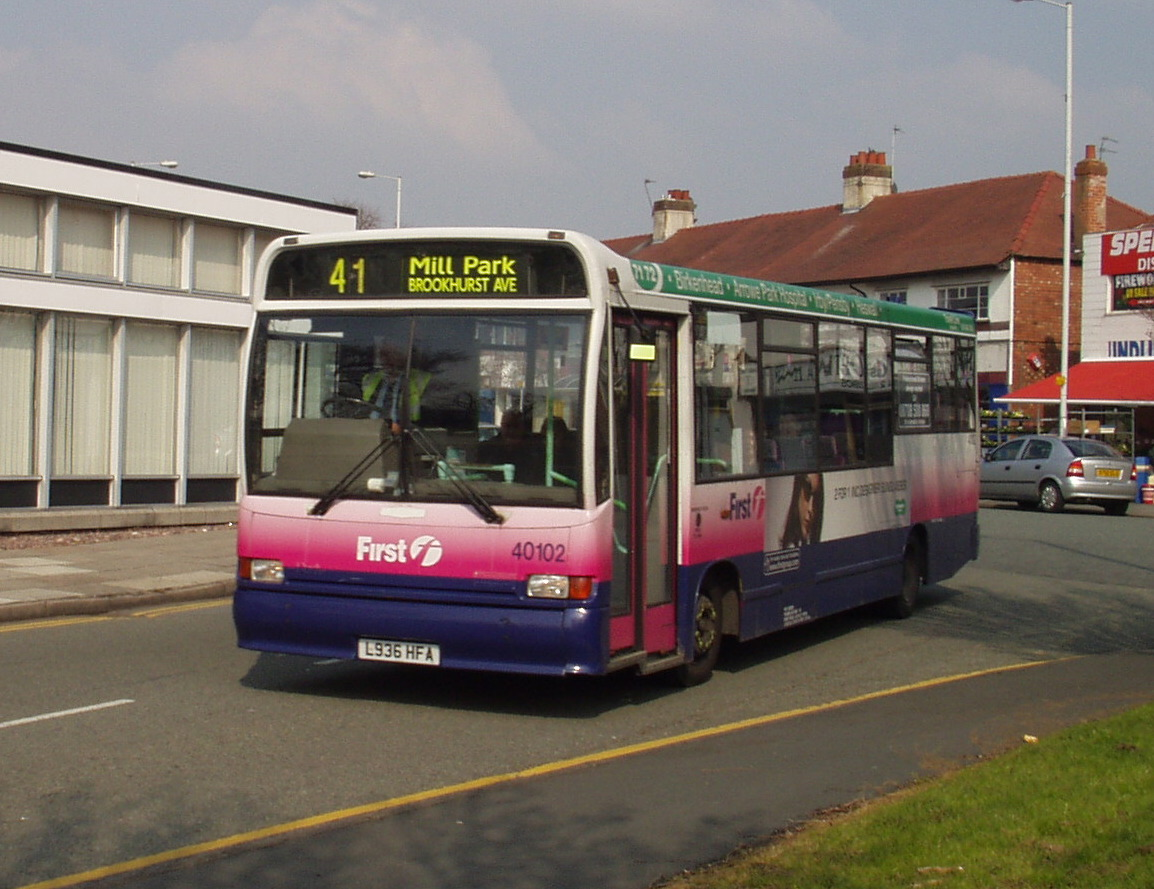
First Chester & The Wirral C37 bodied Dennis Dart in Bromborough in March 2007

Marshall Bus was established in the 1940s by David Marshall. In 1958 it bought the bus bodying business of Mulliners. During the 1960s it bodied many buses for British Electric Traction. It ceased manufacturing in the early 1980s.

In January 1992, Marshall Bus re-entered the bus bodying industry after purchasing the rights to the Duple Dartline from Carlyle Works. It also completed bodies on Iveco Ford 49.10s and Volvo B6s.

The company's most popular product was the Marshall Capital, which was a single-decker bus body built between 1997 and 2003. It was built on Dennis Dart SLF and MAN chassis.

In the 1990s, Marshalls performed overhauls on West Midlands Travel MCW Metrobuses. In 2001–02 Marshall rebuilt a number of AEC Routemasters for Transport for London.

In 2001 the business was sold by Marshall Special Vehicles in a management buyout. In 2002, Marshall was placed in administration and ceased trading shortly afterwards. MCV Bus and Coach bought the design rights for the Capital body and continued production for a short while before its successor, the MCV Stirling, was introduced.

== Products ==
- C16/C19 (from Carlyle)
- C27 Dartline (from Duple/Carlyle)
- C29 (from Carlyle)
- C31
- C32/C33
- C35/C36/C37
- C39 Capital
- C43 Capital
- Camair 80
- Euro
- Minibus
