= Dart Buses =

Former Scottish bus operator

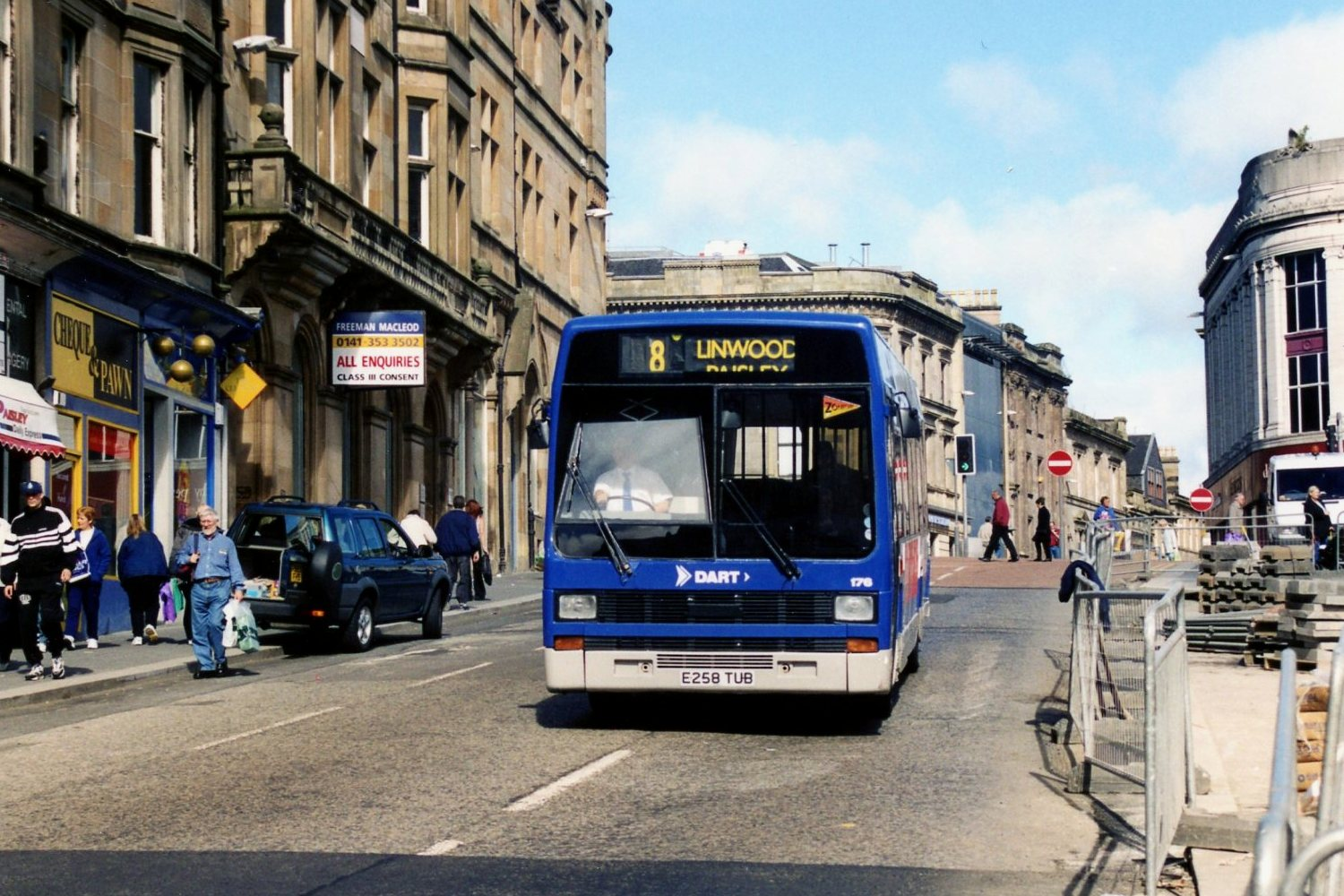
A Leyland Lynx of Dart Buses in Paisley a month before the company's closure

Dart Buses was an independent bus operator in the Paisley and Renfrewshire area in the 1990s. It was purchased by Cowie Group, who rebranded the operation Arriva Scotland West. Dart concentrated on fleet improvements and providing links that were not operated by Arriva. The company collapsed overnight in October 2001.

== History ==
The company began by operating second-hand minibuses on local routes around Paisley. The company started to expand, particularly in the Gryffe area around Johnstone, Bridge of Weir, and Kilmacolm, in competition with Clydeside Scottish.

In the late 1990s Clydeside was purchased by the Cowie Group, who rebranded the operation Arriva Scotland West. Arriva then bought a 25% stake in Dart, with the result that the two companies scaled back competition with each other; Dart focused on the Gryffe area services and motorway express buses, whilst Arriva concentrated on local Paisley business.

Dart expanded its express buses to other towns such as Kilbarchan as well as competing for Strathclyde PTE (SPT) tenders to operate local buses in Glasgow and East Kilbride. A number of SPT contracts were won, mostly from First Glasgow, and several new buses were bought for these routes. A small number of school contracts were also taken on.

Stagecoach West Scotland bought Arriva's stake in the business in 2001 and Dart began operating some of Stagecoach's routes in Glasgow and Pollok, operating their buses on these services in Stagecoach livery.

Dart suddenly collapsed overnight in October 2001. There were no warnings to the imminent collapse, other than the vehicles had been filling up using pumps outside of its depot. In the aftermath, most services were non-operational that day although some local operators did step in to help. First Glasgow took on Dart's drivers and registered their express buses, and SPT tendered the other routes on an emergency basis that operators were unwilling to operate but were vital services. Most of the tenders were won by local companies, most notably Riverside Transport, who also took on several of the Gryffe local services.

== See also ==
- List of bus operators of the United Kingdom
