= Cummins B Series engine =

Cummins B-Series Engine
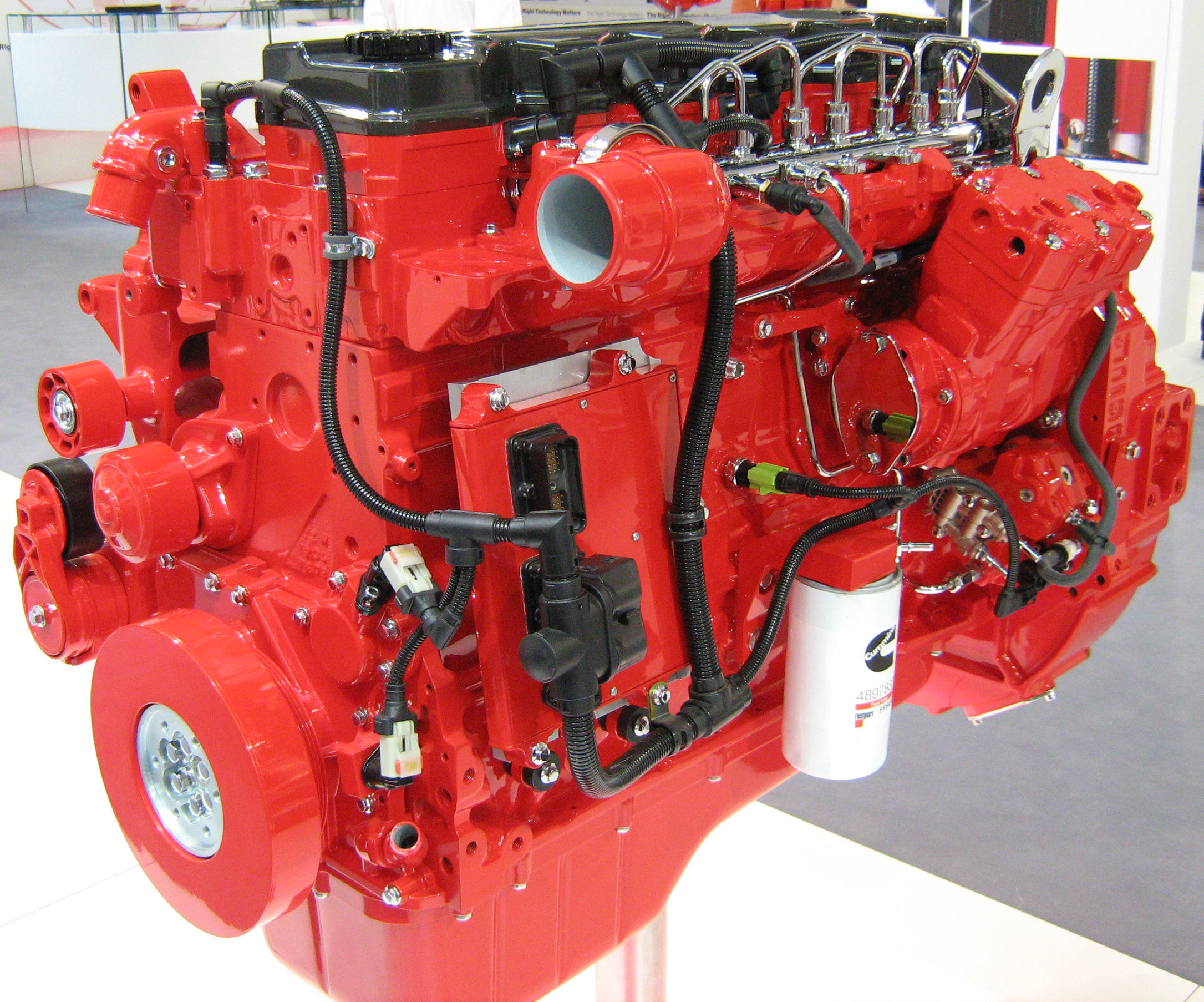
- 6.7 Euro 4 / 4+

Overview
- Manufacturer: Cummins
- Also called: 4B/4BT/4BTA; 6B/6BT/6BTA; ISB; QSB; B
- Production: 1984–present

Layout
- Configuration: I4, I6
- Displacement: 3.9 L (3,922 cc; 239.3 cu in); 4.5 L (4,460 cc; 272.2 cu in); 5.9 L (5,883 cc; 359.0 cu in); 6.7 L (6,690 cc; 408.2 cu in); 7.2 L (7,200 cc; 439.4 cu in)
- Cylinder bore: 102 mm (4.02 in); 107 mm (4.21 in)
- Piston stroke: 120 mm (4.72 in); 124 mm (4.88 in); 133 mm (5.24 in)
- Cylinder block material: Cast iron
- Cylinder head material: Cast iron
- Valvetrain: Cam-in-block; 2 (B-Series) or 4 (ISB, QSB, 2018+B-series) valves/cylinder
- Compression ratio: 17.2:1, 17.3:1, 17.5:1, 19:1

Combustion
- Turbocharger: Holset Engineering (variable, optional)
- Fuel system: Common rail high pressure direct injection, symmetrical combustion chamber with 7-hole injectors
- Management: Bosch mechanical with electronic advance
- Fuel type: Diesel, Gasoline, Natural Gas, Propane
- Oil system: Wet sump
- Cooling system: Water cooled

Output
- Power output: 53–420 hp (40–313 kW)
- Torque output: 265–1,075 lb⋅ft (359–1,458 N⋅m)

Dimensions
- Dry weight: 1,359 lb (616 kg)

Emissions
- Emissions control systems: Electronic fuel control, DPF and EGR

The Cummins B Series is a family of diesel engines produced by American manufacturer Cummins. In production since 1984, the B series engine family is intended for multiple applications on and off-highway, light-duty, and medium-duty. In the automotive industry, it is best known for its use in school buses, public service buses (most commonly the Dennis Dart and the Alexander Dennis Enviro400) in the United Kingdom, and Dodge/Ram pickup trucks.

Since its introduction, three generations of the B series engine have been produced, offered in both inline-four and inline-six configurations in multiple displacements.

== General engine features ==
The B-series features engine bores machined directly into the block (rather than the wet liners used on earlier Cummins engines). It is also set apart by the use of a shallow one-piece head, requiring closer tolerances than in other Cummins products. Unlike earlier diesel engines, the B-series Cummins used direct injection and did not need glow plugs for cold starting. The engine was first manufactured in Rocky Mount, North Carolina, and other plants were later added in Mexico, Brazil, Turkey, and Darlington, UK.

It uses a gear-drive camshaft for extra reliability. Also specified is a deep-skirt engine block and extra-strong connecting rods. A Holset turbocharger is used. The original B Series was updated with 24 valves and an electronic engine management system to become the ISB in 1998.

== B engine ==
=== 3.9 L ===
The 3.9-liter 4B/4BT/4BTA Cummins is categorized under the B Engine family alongside the 5.9-liter 6B/6BT/6BTA Cummins diesel engines. The 3.9 is an inline four-cylinder, either naturally aspirated (4B) or turbodiesel (4BT/4BTA), which was popular for many step van applications including bread vans and other commercial vehicles. Additionally it has seen broad usage in agricultural equipment. It has also gained popularity as an engine swap into smaller trucks and SUVs.

==== 4B ====
The lowest powered, naturally aspirated 3.9-liter Cummins, the 4B, produces 53 hp (40 kW). This variant is most commonly found in equipment such as generators and wood chippers.

==== 4BT ====
The 4BT is one of two turbocharged variants of the 3.9L B-Series engine. It has two valves per cylinder for a total of eight. The most common output of this variant is 105 horsepower.

==== 4BTA ====
The 4BTA is turbocharged, and aftercooled with four valves per cylinder for a total of sixteen. The most common output of this variant is 170 hp (127 kW).

=== 5.9 L ===
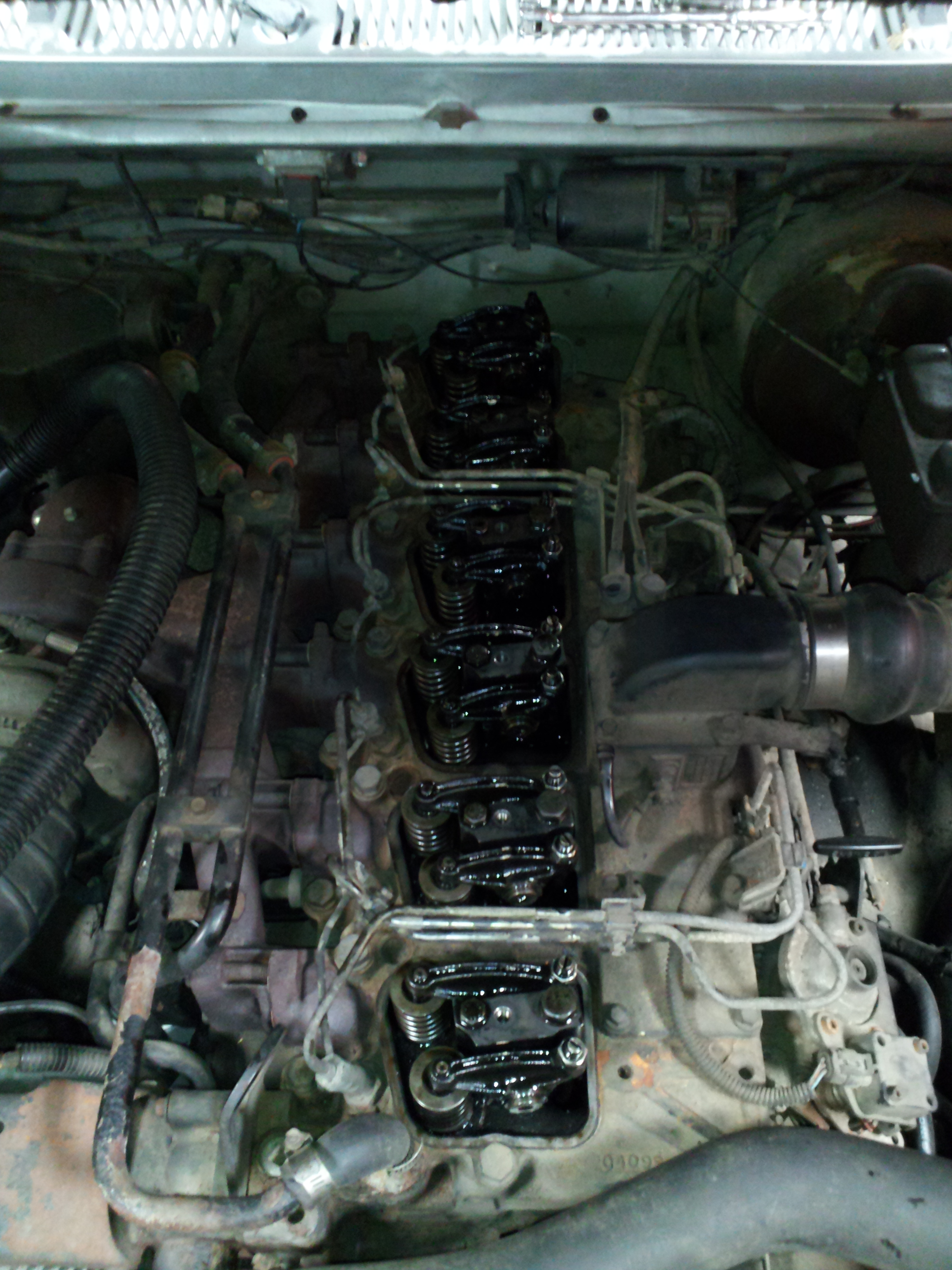
5.9L 6BT Cummins in 1991 Dodge RAM with the valve covers removed exposing the valvetrain

5.9 L B-Series Cummins
Production: 1984–1998
Camshaft drive: Gear driven
Crankshaft: Forged steel, 7 main bearings
System capacity with filter: 3.5 US gal (13 L; 2.9 imp gal)
Cooling system: 6 US gal (23 L; 5.0 imp gal) coolant
System capacity incl heater: 6.5 US gal (25 L; 5.4 imp gal) coolant
Power output: 160–230 hp (119–172 kW) at 2500 rpm
Torque: 400 - 400–440 lb⋅ft (542–597 N⋅m) at 1600 rpm
Compression ratio: 17.5:1

The 5.9 L Cummins, also known as the "12-Valve" Cummins, was the first member of the Cummins B-Series to be used in a light truck vehicle. The 6BT used Bosch fuel systems, injector, and VE rotary pump and P7100 inline injection pumps. Some early 6BTs were supplied with CAV rotary pumps instead, before the Bosch system became the sole standard. This engine started life in 1984 designed as an agricultural engine, for use in Case agricultural equipment. After 1989, the 6BT engine was used in light duty, medium duty and select heavy duty trucks and buses. The 6BT engine has recently become very popular for use in repowering various vehicles.

==== 6B ====
The 6B is the naturally aspirated version of the 6BT with a power output of 115 hp (86 kW) at 2,500 rpm, a peak torque output of 270 lb⋅ft (366 N⋅m) at 1,200 rpm, and a compression ratio of 19:1. There were no OEM automotive applications for 6B engines.

==== 6BT ====
Appearing in the 1989–1998 Dodge Ram pickup truck, it became a popular alternative to the large gasoline V8 engines normally used in full-size pickup trucks, since it produced torque at low engine RPM, and achieved significantly better fuel mileage. Due to the direct fuel injection, the 6BT has no glowplugs.

==== 6BTA ====
The 6BTA is Turbocharged, and aftercooled, with an air to water after cooler mounted on the intake. Has a compression ratio of 16.5:1.

=== 6.7 L ===
==== B6.7 ====
B6.7L Cummins
Production: 2007 (2017 as B6.7) – present (diesel variant production ended 2026)
Displacement: 6.7 L; 408.2 cu in (6,690 cc)
Bore x stroke: 107 mm × 124 mm (4.21 in × 4.88 in)
Max power: 183–360 hp (136–268 kW; 186–365 PS) at 2600 rpm
Torque: 516–811 lb⋅ft (700–1,100 N⋅m) at ~1600 rpm
Compression ratio: 17.3:1
Emissions control: EGR and DPF
Turbocharger: Holset Engineering (variable)
Fuel system: Common rail High pressure direct injection with 7-hole injectors
Camshaft drive: Gear driven
Crankshaft: Forged steel, 7 main bearings
Oil System capacity with filter: 3 US gal (11 L; 2.5 imp gal)

The B6.7L is just a re-named version of the ISB 6.7L. Cummins renamed it to B6.7 instead of ISB6.7 most likely sometime around 2018 or 2019. The only real difference from the initial ISB engine is the change of emissions equipment over the years and the valve cover does not have that hump, do note some slight differences in power ratings. The B6.7 ended production in 2026, being replaced by the Cummins B7.2L. The B6.7N and B6.7 octane variants will still be produced.

==== B6.7N ====
The B6.7N is a CNG variant of the B6.7L/ISB6.7L.

==== B6.7 "Octane" ====
The B6.7L "Octane" is a version of the B6.7L diesel that can use Propane, or 87 Octane Gasoline as fuel. It is marketed to "have the power of diesel and the simplicity of gas". Engine production starts with model year 2027. The B6.7 Octane is Cummins’ first gasoline-powered engine built on the B-series platform, delivering up to 300 horsepower and 660 lb-ft of torque while maintaining the durability typically associated with diesel engines. It uses 87-octane gasoline, the B6.7 Octane provides diesel-like torque.

=== 7.2 L ===
==== B7.2 ====
B7.2L Cummins
Production: 2026–present
Displacement: 7.2 L; 439.4 cu in (7,200 cc)
Bore x stroke: 107 mm × 133 mm (4.21 in × 5.24 in)
Max power: 240–340 hp (179–254 kW; 243–345 PS) at 2400 rpm
Torque: 650–1,000 lb⋅ft (881–1,356 N⋅m) at ~1600 rpm

Cylinder Configuration : Straight-six
Compression ratio: N/A
Emissions control: EGR and DPF
Turbocharger: Holset Engineering (variable)
Fuel system: Common rail High pressure direct injection with 7-hole injectors
Camshaft drive: Gear driven
Crankshaft: Forged steel, 7 main bearings
Oil System capacity with filter: 4 US gal (15 L; 3.3 imp gal)

The Cummins B7.2L was announced in March 2025 for production in 2026 or 2027. It is the evolution of the B6.7L, thus becoming the latest B-series engine. Cummins claims that the higher displacement will allow for more torque options and better emissions. The B7.2 ranges from 240-340 horsepower, its applications are medium duty trucks, school buses, transit buses and recreational vehicles. It will be manufactured at the Rocky Mount Engine Plant in Rocky Mount, North Carolina

== ISB engine ==
=== 4.5 L ISB ===
The 4.5 L ISB is essentially a four-cylinder, two-thirds version of the 6.7 L ISB rated at 185 hp (138 kW), used in the New Routemaster, a series hybrid diesel-electric doubledecker bus in London.

=== 5.9 L ISB ===
5.9 L ISB Cummins
Production: 1998.5–2007
Camshaft drive: Gear driven
Crankshaft: Forged steel, 7 main bearings
System capacity with filter: 3 US gal (11 L; 2.5 imp gal)
Fuel system: Common rail High pressure direct injection, symmetrical combustion chamber
Management: Bosch Mechanical with electronic advance
Power output: 325 hp (242 kW) at 2900 rpm
Torque: 610 lb⋅ft (827 N⋅m) at 1600 rpm
Compression ratio: 17.2:1
Emissions control: Electric fuel control

The 5.9 L; 359.0 cu in (5,883 cc) ISB (Interact System B) is one of the largest straight-six engines used for light truck vehicles and school buses, and the improved high output 600 version was on the Ward's 10 Best Engines list for 2004.

One unusual feature of the ISB is that it is a multi-valve pushrod engine design, with four valves per cylinder (popularly referred to as the "24-Valve" Cummins). The engine displaces 5.9 L; 359.0 cu in (5,883 cc), with a 102 mm × 120 mm (4.02 in × 4.72 in) cylinder bore and piston stroke. A turbocharger is used to increase the output in the high-compression (17.2:1 in recent versions) diesel. It is an all-iron engine with forged steel connecting rods, an assembled camshaft, and a cast aluminum intake manifold. The engine is produced in Columbus, Indiana.

The ISB uses electronically controlled Bosch fuel systems, unlike the 6BT systems which were mechanical. Early ISB engines utilize Bosch injectors and a Bosch VP44 high pressure pump. Later ISB designs have common rail fuel injection, Bosch injectors, and a Bosch CP3 high pressure pump.

==== Dodge Ram ISB ====
Midway through model year 1998, the Dodge Ram switched from the 6BT to the ISB to meet updated emissions requirements. Like other ISB's, these engines started out using the Bosch VP44 rotary injection pump. The VP44 setup meant that timing and fuel could be precisely controlled, which led to cleaner emissions. However, VP44 failure rates were higher than the older P7100 injection pump. The compression ratio in these engines was 17.2:1. The 1998–2000 ISB was rated at 215 hp (160 kW; 218 PS) and 420 lb⋅ft (569 N⋅m) when equipped with the 47RE automatic transmission. The 1998–2000 ISB was rated at 235 hp (175 kW; 238 PS) and 460 lb⋅ft (624 N⋅m) when equipped with a manual transmission. For the 2001–2002 years, a standard output and a high output ISB Cummins engine were offered. The standard output, which was the same as the previous engines was rated to 235 hp (175 kW; 238 PS) and 460 lb⋅ft (624 N⋅m) when equipped with either a manual transmission or automatic. The high output ISB was rated at 245 hp (183 kW; 248 PS) and 505 lb⋅ft (685 N⋅m), with only a NV5600 six-speed manual transmission available. The high output engine was different in a few ways from the standard output engine; it had higher compression (17.3:1), powdered metal valve seat inserts, a larger flywheel, the Bosch fuel system was reworked to allow higher fuel flows, and fuel-injection timing was altered.

==== Dodge Ram ISB CR ====
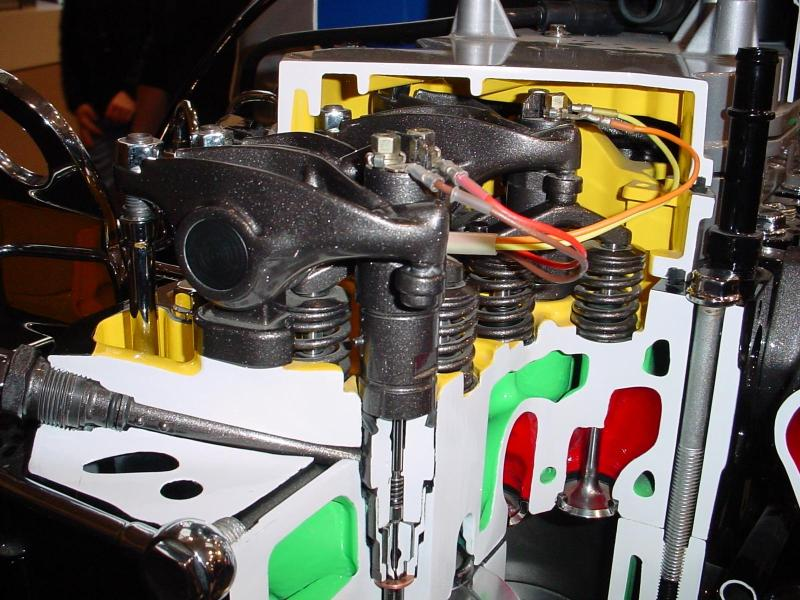
5.9 Cummins Common rail fuel injection system

For the 2003 model year, the Cummins was introduced with Bosch high pressure common rail fuel injection, again increasing power output. On automatic equipped vehicles, the 47RE was upgraded internally to increase durability and torque capacity, now known as the 48RE. The 2003 rating for the Dodge truck was released at 305 hp (227 kW; 309 PS) and 555 lb⋅ft (752 N⋅m). Midway through the 2004 model year, the Cummins 600 was introduced, producing 325 hp (242 kW; 330 PS) at 2,900 rpm and 600 lb⋅ft (813 N⋅m) at 1,600 rpm. This engine was noticeably quieter than the previous engines. The 5.9l ISB CR was the last diesel engine put in Dodge Ram Trucks that did not require emissions technology.

=== 6.7 ISB ===
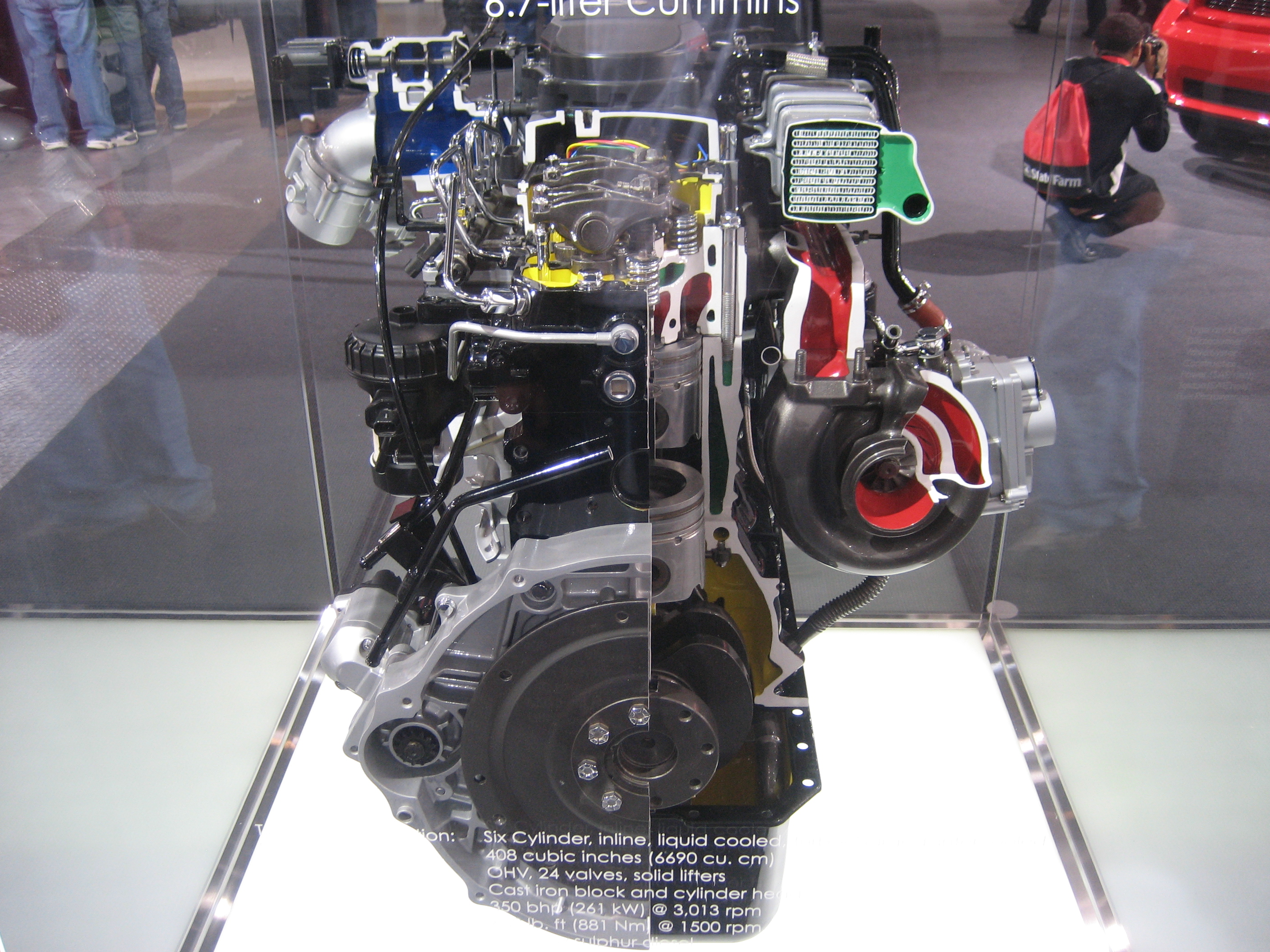
6.7 Demo

6.7 L ISB Cummins
Production: 2007 – 2017 (to 2026 as B6.7)
Displacement: 6.7 L; 408.2 cu in (6,690 cc)
Bore x stroke: 107 mm × 124 mm (4.21 in × 4.88 in)
Max power: 150–420 hp (112–313 kW; 152–426 PS) at 2800 rpm
Torque: 610–1,075 lb⋅ft (827–1,458 N⋅m) at ~1600 rpm
Compression ratio: 17.3:1
Emissions control: EGR and DPF
Turbocharger: Holset Engineering (variable)
Fuel system: Common rail High pressure direct injection with 7-hole injectors
Camshaft drive: Gear driven
Crankshaft: Forged steel, 7 main bearings
Oil System capacity with filter: 3 US gal (11.4 L)

The 6.7 L ISB was the latest version of the B Series from 2007 to 2018. It was the largest straight-six engine produced for a light duty truck or school bus. It produces 350 hp (261 kW; 355 PS) and 650 lb⋅ft (881 N⋅m) in the 2007.5 and newer Dodge 2500/3500 pickup trucks with the Chrysler-built six-speed 68RFE automatic transmission built at the Kokomo Transmission plant in Kokomo, Indiana. Engine torque is slightly reduced with the Mercedes G56 6-speed manual transmission at 350 hp (261 kW; 355 PS) and 610 lb⋅ft (827 N⋅m). The 2007 and newer 3500 Cab & Chassis trucks only get the 305 hp (227 kW; 309 PS) and 610 lb⋅ft (827 N⋅m) version of the B6.7, whether it has the Aisin AS68RC or the Mercedes G56 6-speed manual transmission. As for the 2008 4500/5500 medium duty Chassis Cabs or the Sterling Bullet Trucks, they receive the 350 hp (261 kW; 355 PS) and 610 lb⋅ft (827 N⋅m) version of the B6.7, whether it has the Aisin AS68RC or the Mercedes G56 6-speed manual transmission. Late model 2011 Ram trucks produce 350 hp (261 kW; 355 PS) and 800 lb⋅ft (1,085 N⋅m), with the exhaust brake rating boosted from 150 hp (112 kW; 152 PS) to 222 hp (166 kW; 225 PS).

For 2019 this engine was updated to produce 400 hp (298 kW; 406 PS) and 1,000 lb⋅ft (1,356 N⋅m) torque.

It was also used in almost every new school bus in the US, being a default engine option with most manufacturers from 2010/2015-2026, and BMC Procity city buses

==== Changes over the 5.9 L ISB ====
There are many changes over the previous 5.9 L ISB for the Dodge truck, the most obvious being the larger displacement. The 6.7 ISB had an increase of cylinder bore and piston stroke to 107 mm × 124 mm (4.21 in × 4.88 in), respectively, thereby giving a displacement of 6.7 L; 408.2 cu in (6,690 cc).

With the 6.7 L ISB came the introduction of the Variable Geometry Turbocharger (VGT). The VG Turbocharger was introduced to reduce turbo lag by adjusting the vanes by sliding a steel ring in the exhaust housing dependent on engine RPM creating more or less pressure inside the exhaust housing and controlling the speed of the turbocharger. It also works as an integrated exhaust brake system and is all controlled by an electronic actuator on the turbocharger. This VGT system has been an extremely common issue with the 6.7 L ISB and is typically diagnosed by the loss of the vehicle's exhaust brake.

== QSB engine ==
=== 5.9 QSB ===
The 5.9 L QSB (Quantum System B) is an off-road, heavy duty version of the ISB. Typically used in marine, agricultural, and construction applications, these engines share many of the same parts as the ISB and utilize the same Bosch fuel system.

== Cummins "HELM" ==
=== Next gen engines ===
The newest of the cummins B-series engines are part of cummins' "HELM" line up, including the B7.2L, and the B6.7 OCTANE. The HELM line up is not exclusive to the B-series, it also includes part of the X-series (X15, X15N, X10). The "HELM" line up "allows customers to choose the fuel type that best suits their needs".

== Fuel system ==
=== Mechanical injection with mechanical timing ===
In the earlier models of the Cummins B-Series Engine, it was almost entirely mechanical including its fuel system. The fuel pump used in these engines was the Bosch P7100 injection pump, this pump is driven off the camshaft gear and drives its own internal camshaft to inject fuel to the individual injectors. This pump itself was one of the most popular options for fueling for the B-Series Engines because of this simplistic design and how reliable it was. The P7100 injection pump also allows for large amounts of fuel to be delivered into the system with simple tweaking to the system to allow for larger injection events.

=== Mechanical injection with electronic timing ===
In the later models of B-Series Engine, the fuel system was switched from mechanical injection and timing to mechanical injection with electronic timing. This was all thanks to Bosch's new VP44 radial distributor injection pump. The VP44 injection pump is driven at half the camshaft speed and produces an injection pressure of up to 140 MPa (20,300 lbf/in^{2}).

=== Mechanical injection with electronic timing and common rail pressurization ===
The most recent method of fuel injection used in Cummins B Series engines is electronically controlled common-rail injection. It has been used in Cummins B Series engines and the B-Series based NEF engine since 2003.
