= Christchurch Transport Board =

New Zealand municipal authority

- Abbreviation: CTB
- Successor: Christchurch Transport Limited
- Formation: 26 September 1902 (constituted)
- Dissolved: 31 October 1989
- Type: Municipal authority
- Legal status: Disestablished
- Purpose: Public transport
- Headquarters: Carruca House, Christchurch
- Location: Christchurch
- Region served: Christchurch city, neighbouring boroughs and road districts
- Chairman: William Reece (first); Patrick Neary (last)
- Main organ: Board of elected members
- Formerly called: Christchurch Tramway Board

The Christchurch Transport Board was an autonomous special-purpose municipal authority responsible for the construction, acquisition, and ownership of local transport assets and the operation of public transport services in the Christchurch region of New Zealand's South Island. Constituted as the Christchurch Tramway Board in 1902, it operated trams and buses to Christchurch's outer suburbs and satellite towns for 84 years until being disestablished in the 1989 local government reforms.

The Board assumed control of the existing network of privately run tramways and converted these to electric operation whilst also extending the network. Economy measures resulted in several tram routes being converted to trolley bus and later diesel bus operation from the 1930s. The remaining tram routes were progressively closed in the decade following the end of World War II as the infrastructure required renewal or replacement. The last of the Board's trams were withdrawn in 1954, followed by its trolley buses in 1956. Its operations were fully converted to diesel buses in 1964 when the last of its older vehicles were replaced, including its petrol buses.

Subsequent to its demise, the Board's bus operation was transferred to a Local Authority Trading Enterprise (LATE) and was just one of several service providers in Christchurch following deregulation in mid-1991. The remnants of the Board survived until it was sold in 2020 as the Christchurch City Council-owned Red Bus, the name by which it had been known since 1991.

== History ==
=== Background ===
From 1880 a series of tramway routes had been constructed and operated by private companies using both horse and steam as motive power. While these services heralded a major improvement to local transport at the time, at around the turn of the century there was a mood for change. Other towns and cities around the country had either already established electric tram networks or were considering their introduction including Auckland (1902), Dunedin (1903), and Wellington (1904).

The concessions under which the Christchurch Tramway Company was operating were due to expire at various times between September 1899 and 1919. With this in mind it sought to negotiate with the various local bodies concerned for an extension of these concessions, both to enable it to continue its business and to provide some certainty for future investment. With public sentiment in favour of electrification, and the parlous financial state of the private tramway companies making it unlikely that they would be able to provide such a service, the councils were opposed to renewing the concessions.

By the turn of the century the Christchurch City Council was strongly in favour of bringing the tramways under municipal control but only on its own terms. This ignited suspicion amongst Christchurch City's neighbouring boroughs – through whose territory such a system would have to be built even if only to replace the existing private network – that they would have no control over the running of such a system. A series of tramway conferences were held from the mid-1890s for the local bodies involved to advance the cause of municipalisation but it was not until March 1902 that the City Council acquiesced to the demands of its neighbours for a tramway board with elected members. The Tramway Conference had received an offer to construct and operate an electric tramway system from British Electric Traction (the same company that had the contract for the Auckland system) in February but, despite public support for the proposal, declined as they were already in favour of municipal control.

Despite generally favourable public opinion on bringing electric trams to Christchurch there were some objectors. These included the Royal Society who believed an electric tramway system would cause magnetic disturbances that would interfere with readings made at its Christchurch observatory; the municipal utilities who feared leakage from the return current of an electric tramway would corrode underground pipes through electrolysis; and the telephone authority who believed that the flow of electricity through such a system would interfere with earth currents in telephone circuits and thus render them useless. Solutions were found for all of the utilities concerns.

=== Formation: 1902–1903 ===
The tramway conferences culminated in June 1902 with a decision to create a separate Tramway Board with elected representation from each affected district. To this end the Christchurch Tramway District Act was passed, effective from 26 September 1902, and the Christchurch Tramway Board was born.

The Board's district included the City of Christchurch; the Boroughs of Sydenham, St. Albans, Linwood, Woolston, New Brighton, and Sumner; and all or part of the Road Districts of Spreydon, Avon, Heathcote, Riccarton, and Halswell, with provision made for the future addition of other areas. It was authorised to levy rates in its district for tramway purposes and to raise loans (initially up to £250,000 and later an additional £100,000 if required) subject to approval by plebiscite.

An election was held the following year on 22 January 1903 to elect the first Tramway Board. Fifteen candidates vied for eight positions in a contest that resulted in the election of well-known local politicians and businessmen. The following were elected:

Christchurch – Sydenham – St Albans sub-district

- William Reece
- Henry Wigram
- George Stead
- Arthur Ward Beaven

Linwood sub-district

- Herbert Pearce

Woolston – Sumner – Heathcote sub-district

- George Scott

New Brighton – Avon sub-district

- Arthur Buckland Morgan

Riccarton – Spreydon – Halswell sub-district

- Frederick Waymouth

The Board's first meeting was held on 29 January at which various other officers were appointed. A second meeting was held on 13 February and shortly thereafter the Board was able to hire Hulbert Chamberlain, an American consultant with expertise in electric tramways.

Voters were also asked on the day of the Board election to decide on the issue of amalgamating the boroughs of Sydenham, Linwood, and St. Albans with the City of Christchurch. This proposal was easily carried and formally took effect from 1 April 1903. This was to prove fortuitous for the Tramway Board by making it easier to gain concessions for the construction of tramway lines.

The proposal for the first loan was put before voters on 16 June 1903 and was carried with 89.4% in favour and 10.6% against. Later that year the tramway district was expanded to include the Riccarton – Sockburn sub-district, resulting in a ninth board position being created, which was filled by John Joseph Dougall. A new loan of £55,000 was also approved.

=== Acquisition of tramway companies: 1905–1906 ===
As the private tramway companies were operating under concessions that were due to expire after the Board intended to begin operation, it realised it would have to compensate these companies to become the sole operator in Christchurch. Despite the significant capital investment required for infrastructure renewal in the private tramway lines, and the limited utility of other assets for the Board's operation, none of the parties could reach agreement on a suitable price. In all three cases the amount of compensation was decided through arbitration.

The Christchurch Tramway Company remained in operation until 16 May 1905, the day the Board commenced operation. It had been running at its own risk by special arrangement with the Board since September 1904 when many of its concessions had expired. The Board paid £23,910 for the company's plant.

The Board entered into an agreement with the New Brighton Tramway Company whereby the company would remain in service until the Board was ready to assume control of the line. The company ceased operations on 1 August 1905 at which point it handed its assets over to the Board and was compensated with £7,267. However, construction was behind schedule so the Board contracted William Hayward and Company to supply drivers and horses so it could start its own service. This arrangement lasted until the following year.

The City and Suburban Tramway Company initially indicated to the Board that it would rather continue to provide its horse tram service to which the Board was not agreeable. It ceased operations in November 1906 when it was taken over by the Board and compensated with £7,982.

The City Council received compensation of £1,200 from the Board for its Corporation Line.

=== Heyday: 1905–1914 ===
The Tramway Board officially commenced operations on 5 June 1905 when an official party departed the Falsgrave Street car depot aboard a convoy of seven trams with double-decker trailers at front and rear bound for Papanui. After an accident en route necessitated the withdrawal of the fifth and sixth cars in the procession, the remaining cars proceeded to their destination where an opening day function was held at the Royal Café.

Timetabled services began the following day with Board engineer Hulbert Chamberlain serving as motorman on the first tram. Their novelty quickly made the trams popular with the public causing patronage to rise to "unprecedented and unexpected" levels. As with the earlier private tramway operators, the Board derived much of its income from the carriage of passengers attending major social events or on excursions to popular locations like the beach or racetrack.

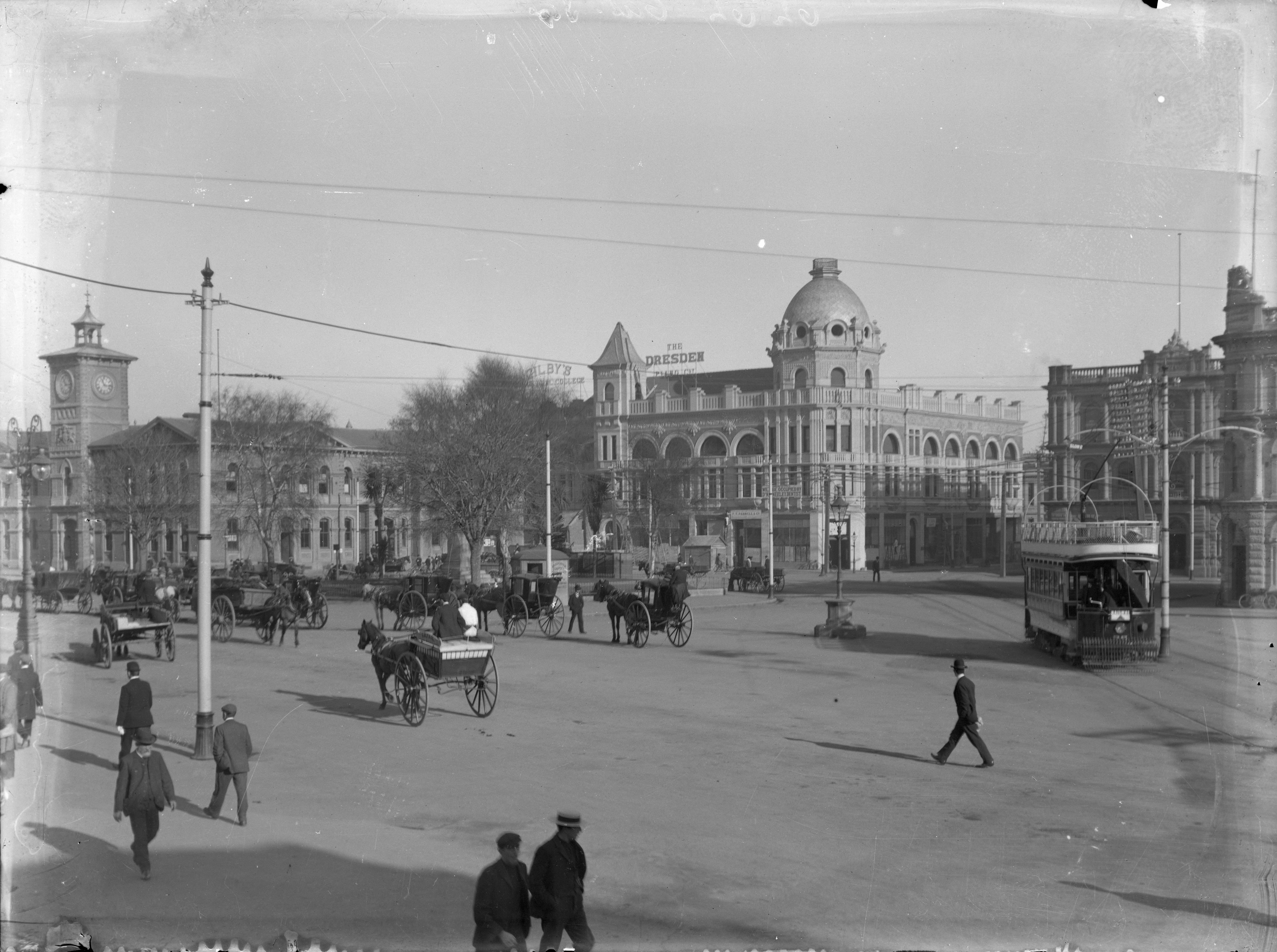
Cathedral Square c.1910

From the beginning it was the Board's intention to eventually operate all lines with electric trams and to retire the use of the horse and steam trams from public service as soon as practicable. Horses continued to be used for a short while on the lines formerly operated by the New Brighton and City and Suburban tramway companies: in the former case because completion of the electrification on that line had been delayed and in the latter case because of pressures on the Board with the construction of lines elsewhere. Other lines were initially operated with the steam motors once the track had been laid but before the installation of the electrical infrastructure had been completed. Steam motors were also used for shunting, to haul special purpose cars used for maintenance, and to haul special services on particularly busy peak days.

The Board's early performance, while not outstanding, was still impressive. The first year of operation generated revenue of £43,109 with the sale of 5,000,000 fares. For the 1907–1908 fiscal year this had risen to £91,083 with 10,500,000 fares sold and for the 1909–1910 period revenue was £105,024 with 12,500,000 fares sold.

The organised labour movement had its first dealings with the Board following the formation of the Christchurch Tramway Worker's Union in 1906. The Board welcomed this move as a way of constructively resolving disputes and other small employment matters. Unlike the unions in Auckland and Wellington, the Christchurch union maintained a cordial relationship with the Board and it was many years later before they called for major industrial action.

The conservative influence on the Board faced its first challenge at the 1912 elections. The preceding year, voting rights in municipal elections had been opened up to all eligible adults, an opportunity various socialist groups sought to take advantage of by fielding their own candidates for election to the Board. Some of the incumbent members warned voters about the possibility of a left-leaning Board putting the concerns of workers ahead of those of the travelling public, and succeeded in having only a single candidate from the opposing camp elected.

=== World War I: 1914–1918 ===
All major tramline construction was completed by 1914 with the opening of the St. Martins line, after which no new lines were built. This was partly as a result of World War I, which restricted the supply of materials and thus meant extensions to the network were not possible. Patronage, which had held up well through the war years, was constrained after war's end by economic conditions restricting the growth of the tramway below that which had been desired by the Board.

The Board adopted a patriotic stance during the war years as seen in measures it adopted at the time including supplementing the military pay of its staff on active duty and expressing a preference in hiring for returned servicemen and those who had attempted to enlist but were deemed unsuitable for military service.

In 1917 the Board purchased its first bus and commenced a feeder service from the end of the Sockburn tram route to Templeton. The bus was a battery-powered vehicle with solid rubber tyres but proved to be so unreliable that it was rebuilt and converted to use a petrol engine. It was later joined by another petrol-powered bus.

A grand plan for the modernisation and improvement of the tramway system was presented to the Board in 1919. It proposed borrowing £340,000 for a series of improvements including the acquisition of new rolling stock, upgraded workshops, double-tracking and new passing loops, and new routes and route extensions. The loan was raised and many of these works were carried out but by the time the Board could seriously consider the issue of the new routes it discovered that post-war inflation had dramatically increased the cost of laying tramlines. As a consequence only two of the proposed seven routes were actually constructed, those being a line along Lichfield Street to connect Oxford Terrace to Colombo Street and an extension of the Spreydon Line.

=== Influenza pandemic: 1918 ===
The Christchurch Transport Board, like most other organisations around the country, was hit hard by the influenza epidemic of 1918. Their employees were affected to the extent that services were cancelled on Sundays from 17 November and evening services after 20:15 were withdrawn from 19 November. These changes remained in effect until 8 December. The lost business during this time is estimated to have cost the Board £3,000.

Additional measures were taken by the Board to assist with the response to the health crisis. Twenty-three of its electric tramcars were converted to "inhalation chambers" and placed around the city; public health workers were given free passes; and all services were operated as open conveyances.

=== Inter-war years: 1918–1939 ===
A recession in 1921 slowed economic activity and caused patronage of the Board's trams, which had in recent years generated healthy returns, to plateau at around 25,000,000 per annum, whereabouts it remained for much of the 1920s.

It was during this period that advances were made in the development of buses that improved their reliability and introduced innovations such as the pneumatic tyre. The Board, which by this time had come to the realisation that it would not be able to afford to significantly extend the tramway network, purchased some additional buses to provide services in areas not served by the trams. These developments also led to the rise of the private bus operators, which were able to provide services in areas not covered by the Board, and later to directly challenge the Board itself. After introducing a number of measures to directly combat the private operators, legislative means were employed to deal with them.

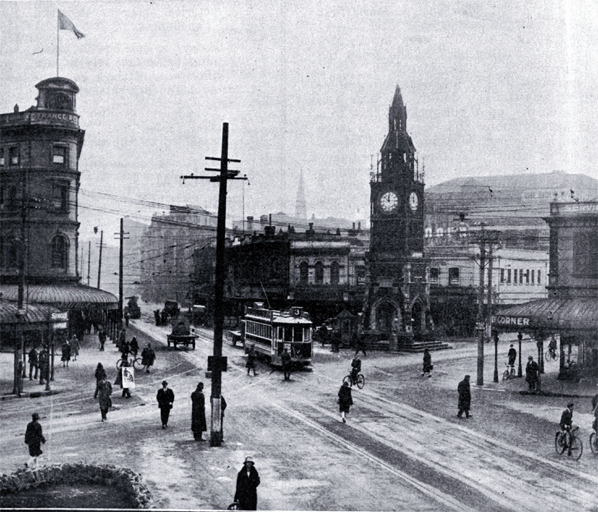
A tram heading southeast down High Street

After the Board purchased the assets and business of most of its private competitors following legislative changes in the mid-1920s, it acquired a motley collection of buses with which it was able to start services on new routes. Despite the high maintenance and inventory costs associated with these vehicles, they were used to establish permanent routes to Bryndwr (originally planned to be a tramline), Springfield Road, Pleasant Point (feeder service), Shirley and Avonside.

Inter City Motors, the one competitor that survived the Board's attempts to eliminate competition, found success in challenging the Board on the New Brighton route. This was a serious problem for the Board's North Beach tramline, one of the least profitable in the system, and whose tortuous path was longer than Inter City Motors' more direct route. The poor state of the track meant that increasing the speed of trams running on the line to combat the Inter City Motors service was not an option so the Board closed the line in 1927, but public pressure resulted in its reopening a short time later. The line continued to deteriorate to the point where replacement or closure was unavoidable. As the former could not be justified, the line was closed permanently beyond Marshland Road and, as the Board had not been impressed with petrol buses, services were replaced with trolley buses in 1931. The trolley buses followed a different route to Marshland Road, enabling the trams to continue running as far as Marshland Road.

Having formed a favourable opinion of trolley buses, the Board decided to use them on a new line to Richmond. However, it realised that its troubles with Inter City Motors on the North Beach route would soon be resolved and given the vehicles that would become available, an extension of the trolley bus system would not be needed. An attempt to cancel the order failed, so the second trolley bus line was opened in 1934 to Marshland Road via Richmond. This enabled trams to be withdrawn from the remaining portion of the North Beach tramline, which followed the same route as the new Richmond trolley bus line.

The diesel engine had become the power plant of choice for commercial transport operators by the mid-1930s, supplanting and effectively making obsolete the petrol engine for such purposes. The advantages of diesel buses prompted a policy change by the Board whereby it would use diesel buses on more lightly patronised routes while remaining committed to trams on major routes. To this end a loan of £20,000 was raised, enabling the Board to purchase 10 AEC diesel-powered chassis and acquire the business of Inter City Motors. The motor bodies were constructed on the chassis by the Board in two configurations, six with half-cabs and four with full-front windscreens. Once completed, they replaced trams on the Dallington route, and petrol buses on the Bryndwr and Springfield Road routes.

With the diesel buses having proved to be a success, it was intended next to replace tram services on the Opawa–Fendalton and St. Martins routes, being the next two least viable tramlines. Though bus services did run to St. Martins for a while, the intervention of World War 2 meant that it was several more years before these tramlines were closed permanently.

Patronage of the trams, which had risen steadily up to the 1920s before levelling out, started to fall in 1928–1930. The Great Depression, brought about by the share market crash in October 1929, only exacerbated the Board's problems. A loss of £1,092 was recorded for 1931 and a projected loss of around £10,000 was expected in 1932 unless there were further measures to reign in costs.

=== Tramway strike: 1932 ===
To address its financial woes, the Board implemented a policy of staff reduction through attrition but as economic conditions worsened, fewer people wanted to leave their jobs with the Board, reducing the effectiveness of the policy. Wages remained the biggest expense, so the Board announced that there would be an 11% wage cut and reduction in working conditions. When the union refused to agree to these terms, the Board exploited a loophole in the industrial award, dismissing its entire traffic staff and then inviting them to apply for new positions with the new conditions. The matter went to arbitration at which the magistrate sided with the union and set aside the changes for a period of 12 months.

Seeking other ways to save money, the Board obtained permission in November 1931 to have only a single conductor on duty per tram regardless of the number of trailers. By mutual agreement with the union in February 1932, it was decided on a temporary system of a reduction in hours for all traffic staff rather than terminating the employment of 11 men that had become redundant. When the men refused to agree to a renewal of this arrangement the Board dismissed 12 of its staff. A rally in support of the tramway men was held on May Day at which it was decided to strike from the following Wednesday if the notices of dismissal were not rescinded. The Board warned its staff that if they refused to go to work on Wednesday that they would be dismissed, and also advertised for "volunteers" to apply for permanent positions with the Board. Despite offers of negotiation from the union, the Board remained implacable in its position.

The strike started peacefully but soon turned violent. Over the next several days there were numerous skirmishes in which trams and tram staff were attacked. Tramcars and the depot were fortified, police accompanied trams on their rounds, and special constables were sworn in to assist the regular police. The strike ended on 10 May after public opinion turned against the striking workers. A special tribunal was established to deal with the matter. It eventually ruled largely in favour of the Board, upholding the dismissal of 40 of the striking union workers with the remainder of the available positions to be filled by the "volunteers" taken on to work during the strike. The result of the incident left much bitterness for many years to come.

=== World War II: 1939–1945 ===
Following New Zealand's declaration of war in 1939, many changes to everyday life were brought about that affected the Board's business. Petrol rationing was immediately introduced, and this combined with shortages of materials such as rubber significantly affected the use of one of the trams greatest competitors: the private motorcar. This prompted an unprecedented boost to patronage of the tramways, often leading to severe overcrowding, and significantly increased the Board's revenue.

Another factor in the Board's favour during this time was the large number of military personnel stationed in and around Christchurch, from the Army at Burnham, the Airforce at Wigram, and a contingent of American soldiers based in the city. Special tickets for soldiers were introduced and remained popular for many years.

The Board also faced several challenges during the war years. Operating costs increased, including staff wages, repair and maintenance, electricity, and standing charges. Supplies of materials and spare parts were restricted, owing to the difficulty of importing them. Staff availability and retention became an issue with many away on active military service, resulting in the hiring of more women.

Wartime regulations required the Board to reduce its bus services to conserve resources, and thus services were cut by a quarter. One of the more obvious effects of this decision was the St. Martins route, which had been converted to bus operation in January 1941, was reactivated as a tram route in July 1942, despite the poor condition of the track.

=== Halcyon years: 1945–1988 ===
The end of the war heralded one of the most turbulent periods in the Board's history. Years of deferred maintenance, heavy usage during the war years, and a lack of skilled staff, materials, and spare parts had left the tramway in poor condition. A significant investment was required to renew the system but uncertainty was growing over the future of the trams. The Board also had to contend with a more aggressive union movement, and a council that was seeking legislative authority to enable it to assume control of the tramway. This was to be one of many occasions on which it was suggested, or an attempt was made, to have the Board assimilated by the City Council or controlled by a Council-affiliated Metropolitan Board of Works.

A committee was formed to investigate the future of the tramway system and reported back in July 1946 that as each line reached the end of its useful life it should be closed and replaced with buses. Providing services to new areas had become a priority, especially as the city was growing beyond the extent of the tramway network.

As an earlier attempt to acquire diesel buses had been thwarted by the war, the Board had to settle for purchasing petrol buses after the war owing to the shortage of diesel vehicles. This enabled the commencement of new services in 1946 to areas not covered by the tramway network including Mount Pleasant, Somerfield, Creyke Road, Huntsbury, Wharenui, and Sanatorium on the Cashmere Hills. Also, buses replaced trams for the second – and final – time on the St. Martins route.

The resignation of general manager Hedley Jarman in October 1946 was followed by the appointment of John Fardell as his replacement. Fardell, having previously been employed at Reading Corporation Transport where he was involved in the replacement of trams with trolleybuses, wasted little time in making his views known on the direction of public transport in Christchurch. He was in favour of the replacement of trams and trolley buses as they reached the end of their useful lives with diesel buses, with the exception of the Papanui–Cashmere route for which he favoured trolley buses.

Accepting that significant capital investment was required to replace the worn-out tramway with buses, the Citizen's Board was granted permission in February 1948 to raise a loan of £1,350,000, subject to approval by plebiscite. As elections for the Board were due later that year, it was decided to run the poll for the loan at the same time. While there was debate as to what mix of diesel and trolley buses would be appropriate in any new system, the Labour Party questioned whether the loan was even affordable: a strategy which saw the loan rejected and a slim Labour majority returned to the Board.

While Fardell was still strongly in favour of a majority diesel-powered bus fleet, this was at odds with the views of the Labour members, which had campaigned on a majority trolley bus fleet. The new board proceeded to order 40 new trolley buses to replace trams on major routes, but the Loans Board rejected the application for a loan to cover the cost of the buses and stabling facilities. Replacement of the tramway had become a matter of some urgency when, in April 1950, the Board decided it had to act and ordered the first 39 of an intended fleet of 105 trolley buses. Permission for a loan of £950,000 was granted, subject to approval by plebiscite. This time, an aggressive advertising campaign preceding the poll succeeded in winning approval for the loan. Despite the move to introduce buses on many tram routes, trams were still favoured for the Papanui–Cashmere route so it was decided to relay track on this line to keep the service going.

During the campaign for the 1951 Board elections, much was made of the fact that the Labour-controlled Board had failed to purchase any new buses. The Labour candidates were seen as lacking credibility having achieved little during the past term with the result that the party was trounced at the poll: no Labour Party members were elected. The new Board, at Fardell's direction, wasted little time in cancelling the trolley bus order that had been placed by the previous board and instead ordered 57 diesel buses to replace trams on several routes.

With the end of the Christchurch tramway system in sight it was decided to re-brand the Christchurch Tramway Board to reflect its move away from a purely tram-based operation. The name of the Board was changed by the Local Legislation Act 1951 which amended the Board's constitutional legislation, the Christchurch Tramway District Act, to officially rename the organisation to Christchurch Transport Board effective from 5 December 1951.

What followed over the next three years was the wholesale closure of what was left of the tramway. As more buses became available they were quickly put to work on routes formerly served by trams. The remaining lines were closed in quick succession starting with Fendalton–Opawa in 1950 and ending with Papanui–Cashmere in 1954. Over the life of the tram network, 1,605,932,516 fares had been sold.

As well as replacing the trams, the new buses were also deployed on new routes in areas of significant residential development including Riccarton, Ilam, Harewood Road, Shirley, Aranui, and Fendalton. Additional buses were ordered in 1956 and 1958. The first batch was to enable the retirement of the last of the trolley buses on the Richmond and Marshland Road route (May 1956) and North Beach (November 1956).

Modernisation of the Board's bus fleet was complete in 1964 when, after an earlier purchase of 24 AEC Reliance chassis in 1961, the Board was able to retire the last of its older buses. This meant that the fleet was now composed entirely of AEC vehicles.

The Board's base of operations was relocated to the north side of Moorhouse Avenue in 1969 (site of the present-day Red Bus depot). The first block of land for this site had been purchased in 1920, with later purchases including a neighbouring brewery in 1940. New workshops had already been established on the site in 1961, with other features including parking for 200 buses and administration and servicing facilities. New headquarters were established in Carruca House when the Board opened the building in July 1973.

John Fardell, who had been at the helm of the Board for nearly three decades, retired in 1973. Max Taylor, who had previously held senior management positions with the Board including Chief Engineer from 1965 and Assistant general manager from 1971, succeeded him.

Patronage of the Board's services, which had been trending downwards since the early 1960s, was boosted in the 1970s by several major events. First, the 1974 Commonwealth Games proved to be a boon for public transport, with an additional 1,525 services provided of which 1,195 were to or from Queen Elizabeth II Park, the main games facility. Second, the oil crises of 1973 and 1979 restricted the use of private motor vehicles leading to an increase in patronage of the buses. This effect was not, however, to last beyond the end of the "car-less days" programme in 1980.

Innovative attempts at new services were made from time to time, occasionally with some success. A central city loop route was started in 1964 for which a small fare was charged, but failed to catch on. The "City Clipper" was introduced in the 1970s on a new central city circuit using buses with a special livery and charging no fare. It was initially backed by local business until 1976, after which it was subsidised until poor patronage led to its demise in the early 1980s. Several services linking shopping malls were tried, largely without success. In 1984 a short-lived service called the "Seaside Special" was started to bring people from southern and northern suburbs to New Brighton on Saturdays for shopping. One of the more successful acquisitions for the Board was the Airport route from Midland Coachlines in 1976.

A Government grant of $50,000,000 to municipal transport authorities in 1977 enabled the Board to purchase 96 Bristol buses that entered service between 1978 and 1981. Nearly a decade later the last major fleet upgrade was made when the Board, in conjunction with several other transport authorities around the country, ordered 90 MAN buses as part of a bulk order in 1986. Though an additional 9 were ordered later, they did not arrive until after the Board was disestablished.

The passing of the Urban Transport Act 1980, based on the recommendations of the Carter Report from 1970, stripped municipal authorities such as the Christchurch Transport Board of their authority to levy rates within their districts. Responsibility for funding public transport was bestowed upon regional authorities – in the Board's case, the Canterbury United (later Regional) Council — in keeping with the view that transport needed to be planned and managed in a co-ordinated way on a regional basis, though this change did not actually take effect until 1 April 1988.

Following the sale and break-up of Midland Motors, the Board obtained its licences to operate public transport services and assumed control of its rural bus routes in November 1982. These routes were integrated into the Board's existing operations and, because Midland had not been allowed to carry short-haul passengers within the Board's rating district, services to Christchurch's satellite settlements were improved under the Board's control, as it did not have these restrictions.

A series of marketing campaigns in the early 1980s was successful in increasing patronage of the Board's buses, culminating in an improvement of 10.3% being reported in the 1984 Annual Report. This was also a time of increasing economic troubles for the country, typified by a dramatic rise in inflation. Following the end of a price and wage freeze, inflation again began to rise sharply, prompting the Tramways Union to campaign for an increase in allowances to cover cost-of-living increases for its members. This resulted in a series of 24- and 48-hour strikes from 8 November 1985 when the Board was not agreeable to their demands, to which the Board responded with a lock-out on 3 December. Fifteen days of industrial action followed, at the conclusion of which the striking staff returned to work having failed to secure any concessions from the Board. Some conditions were curtailed, and the liberal approach to various employment matters that workers had enjoyed was replaced by a hard-liner stance. To make up for revenue forgone during the strikes, fares were raised by 33%. This did not bode well with passengers, and when combined with the loss of goodwill from the recent industrial action, they deserted the buses to the extent that the Board lost around half of the improvement in its patronage of recent years. With the general economic malaise that followed, patronage of the Board's services never recovered to previous levels.

=== Demise: 1988–1989 ===
The Fourth Labour Government implemented a programme of economic reform to stabilise the economy and improve productivity that included the corporatisation and deregulation of state-sector agencies. One area to receive special attention was transport, which under state and municipal control had little or no effective competition. It was felt that this was inefficient and delivered "a poor transport system" as these providers had no incentive to offer a better service or improve their operation.

The Board, which had been aware for some time of the government's intention for organisations such as itself to operate in a more commercial manner, had been making changes with this in mind. The Christchurch City Council had investigated the idea of transforming the Board into a limited liability company in the late 1980s, fully held by the council, but found that the legislation on which the Board was founded had no provision to allow this. An Establishment Unit was created in March 1988, under the auspices of the Local Government Act 1974, to manage the transition of the Board to a commercial entity. The Unit was replaced in October with a Transitional Committee that had wider representation from local authorities to decide the nature of the company that the Board would become.

The rating district, which had been used to subsidise the Board's operations, disappeared with the transfer of responsibility for funding public transport to the Canterbury United Council in April 1988. In its place, they recovered the funds from the local authorities in whose districts the Board operated. A uniform fare structure was introduced, charging passengers by the distance travelled, except those cases where the full subsidy was not forthcoming from the relevant local council in which case higher fares were charged in those areas to compensate.

The local government reforms of 1989 significantly reduced the number of local bodies through amalgamation and disestablished most of the special-purpose bodies then in existence. Regional councils were assigned responsibility for planning and funding of public transport but were not permitted to be involved as a supplier of services. The law required transport assets under municipal control to be either divested or corporatised as Local Authority Trading Enterprises. The Local Government Amendment Act that implemented these reforms became law on 1 November 1989 and marked the end of the Christchurch Transport Board. The Board held its last meeting on 11 October 1989, followed by a large social function at the Ferrymead Heritage Park on 29 October attended by current and former staff.

=== Successor ===
The Board's operations briefly became the responsibility of the Christchurch City Council before being transferred to a new company, Christchurch Transport Limited. The regional council introduced a competitive tendering system in early 1991 for which Christchurch Transport was one of several bidders. The last vestiges of the Board's monopoly position disappeared when the deregulated transport market took effect from 1 July 1991.

=== Centenary reunion: 2003 ===
To commemorate what would have been the centenary of the Board's founding, several former Transport Board staff members resolved in March 2002 to organise a reunion of those who had worked for the Board. It was decided to hold the event on Labour Weekend 2003 in recognition of the first meeting of the Board having been held in January 1903. A charitable society was formed, the CTB 100th Anniversary Society Incorporated, and it was agreed to organise five events to celebrate the occasion as well as the publication of the book CTB: A Brief Social History of the Christchurch Transport Board 1903–1989 and the production of memorabilia.

== Competition ==
=== Private bus companies ===
The Board's first competitor actually began operation before the first tram ran. The Christchurch Motor Omnibus Company commenced its first service from Cathedral Square to the railway station in April 1904. After the trams started running in June 1905 the bus was switched to a Riccarton route. Several other private bus companies were also operating at this time but were of little concern to the Board as the nature of bus technology at the time and the state of the roads meant that trams still offered a superior ride quality.

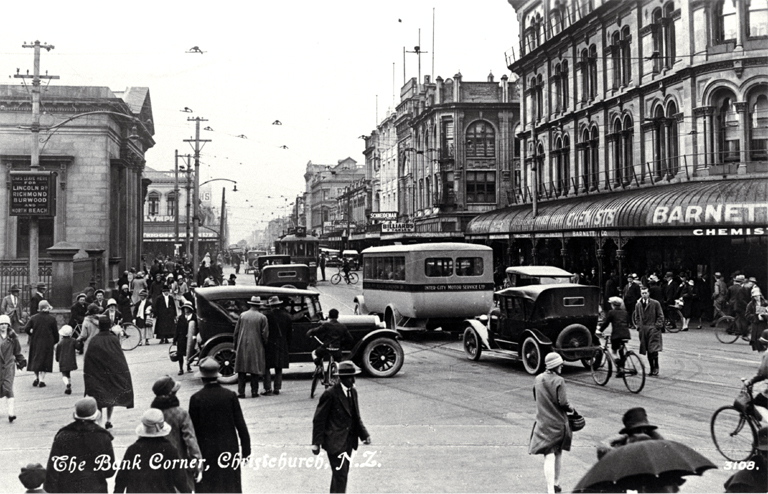
A south-bound Inter City Motor Service bus is about to pass a north-bound tram on Colombo Street

Several private bus operators began offering services to areas not well served by trams from the early 1920s following advancements in the design and reliability of buses. The Board, perceiving this development to be a threat to its business and the significant investment ratepayers had made in it, reluctantly investigated the idea of running its own bus services where it was not economical to run trams. There were six of these companies hoping to pick up business primarily in newer areas of the city that were not covered by or near the tram network.

The problem escalated to be a matter of serious concern for the Board by 1925 when the operators decided to challenge the Board on its key tram routes. Not having the same obligations as the Board enabled the bus companies to run their services ahead of the trams at peak times to capture some of the Board's most lucrative business. Several measures were implemented by the Board to combat this menace including hiring buses to run competing services against the "pirate" operators, adding more express trams, tuning the trams and power supply to improve acceleration characteristics, purchasing additional buses, and stationing roving trams at key points to immediately commence service on the appearance of a rival company's bus. This period, known colloquially as the "bus wars", resulted in many minor traffic accidents, altercations between staff of rival companies and the Board, and buses and trams appearing to race each other on many occasions to be the first to collect passengers. For a select few it also resulted in a much-improved service both in terms of timeliness and frequency as the companies competed with the Board for their custom. The public generally viewed the private operators favourably because they provided either a better service or a service that the Board did not and one for which they had grown tired of waiting for the Board to organise.

Realising that the "bus wars" would not end well the Board colluded with its Auckland counterpart in early 1925 to support the introduction of legislation to control the problem. The Motor Omnibus Traffic Act became law on 1 November 1926 and empowered municipal transport authorities such as the Board to compulsorily acquire their competitors. The only option available to a private company wanting to continue its own service was to charge 2d more per section than the equivalent tram fare. Most of the private operators were unable to compete on these terms and quickly sold out to the Board with the exception of Inter City Motor Service Limited, which was able to continue operations with the higher fares until 1935.

=== Railways Department ===
From the outset the Board did have one consistent competitor in the form of the government-controlled Railways Department. Initially the department and the Board competed with each other for patrons between Papanui and Christchurch railway stations and from the city to the Riccarton Racecourse. The Board held the advantage on the former route, as its line between these two points was more direct (shorter) and ran via the city centre, making it popular with patrons including those who entered the city by train. On the latter route the Board enjoyed superiority patronage-wise, despite the protestations of the Railways Department that its service could get patrons to and from the racecourse more quickly. It was believed that there was a "psychological advantage" in the Board's favour in that its line connected directly with Cathedral Square whereas passengers of the Railways Department heading the same way faced a walk up Colombo Street from Moorhouse Avenue. In both cases the routes terminated at sidings and passenger landings inside the racecourse grounds. The department's service to the racecourse was terminated in 1954 by which time the Board had already converted its competing tram route to diesel bus operation. Diesel buses replaced the tram routes to Christchurch and Papanui railway stations in 1936 and 1954 respectively, though the department did not finally cease suburban passenger operations to these stations until 1976.

While the Lyttelton road tunnel was still under construction, the Board sought and was granted a licence to operate a passenger service to Lyttelton via Ferry Road, which commenced as soon as the tunnel opened in 1964. This route competed for passengers with the Railways Department's Christchurch–Lyttelton suburban passenger trains. Though the department had held out hope that both the Board's and the department's services could coexist following the opening of the road tunnel, and even opened a new railway station at Lyttelton in 1963, the losses mounted due to competition from buses and private motorcars forcing the department to terminate the passenger rail service in 1972. The Board then had its licence for the Lyttelton route altered so it could run its buses roughly paralleling the railway line to collect passengers who had been using the rail service.

=== Other ===
In the decades preceding World War 2, the bicycle amounted to one of the Board's biggest competitors thanks largely to Christchurch's flat terrain, numbering as many as 50,000. They were popular for commuting and for many were the only form of transport a household had. The Board maintained a hostile attitude to them, and they were not popular with the tramway men for the major fluctuations in patronage they could cause depending on the weather.

Private motorcars were starting to become more common in the 1920s, but were initially more of a danger to tram passengers than to the business of the Board. As many tramlines ran down the middle of a road, it was common to hail a tram by walking out into the road, which became more dangerous with the faster moving motorcars. Also, traffic behind a tram that had stopped to allow for the embarkation or disembarkation of passengers was only able to pass between the tram and curb, right into the path of passengers moving between the tram and footpath.

A significant portion of the Board's business was derived from the evening fares of people going out to social functions or events at places such as cinemas, dance halls, clubs, and the like. The introduction of television in the early 1960s gave people a new and more convenient way to spend their leisure time, significantly affecting the popularity of these types of activities. A fall of 19% in the Board's revenue between 1962 and 1968 was largely down to the sale of fewer off-peak fares.

== Routes ==
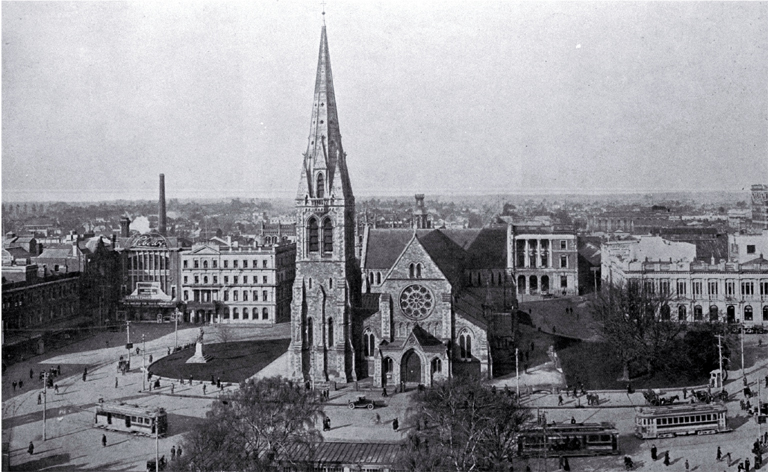
Cathedral Square, 1926

The Christchurch Transport Board utilised a variety of transport modes to provide public transport services. Starting with trams when it began operations in 1905, it later experimented with petrol buses in the 1920s, trolley buses from the early 1930s, and introduced its first diesel buses in the mid-1930s.

All of the Board's tram routes and the majority of its bus routes were designed around a radial model where services either terminated at, or ran through, a central interchange. There were some special bus services operating on point-to-point or orbital routes but these tended to be either ephemeral in nature or designed for a specific clientele (e.g. shoppers).

Some routes included short workings, which were typically extra services run to intermediary termini to cope with high loadings at peak times. A wide-ranging review of the bus route network instigated in the late 1970s resulted in the termination of most of these short workings, the amalgamation of shorter routes into longer ones, and the re-timing of many services to make arrival times more realistic.

=== Tram network ===
Assets acquired by the Board from the old private tramway companies included lines serving the localities of Papanui, North Beach, New Brighton, Sumner, Cashmere, and Hillmorton. These lines, along with a new line to Riccarton, were included in the first tranche of construction to be undertaken on the network. Electric trams commenced services as electrification works were completed to Papanui and Christchurch Railway Station (6 June 1905); Sumner (25 April 1907); Cashmere (16 August 1905); Riccarton (12 March 1906); Lincoln Road (8 February 1906); and New Brighton (6 August 1906). Some of these lines had opened earlier using steam traction while electrification was still underway. Trams were stabled at the depot on Falsgrave Street and, using lines along Manchester and Colombo Streets, started their runs from a central hub at Cathedral Square.

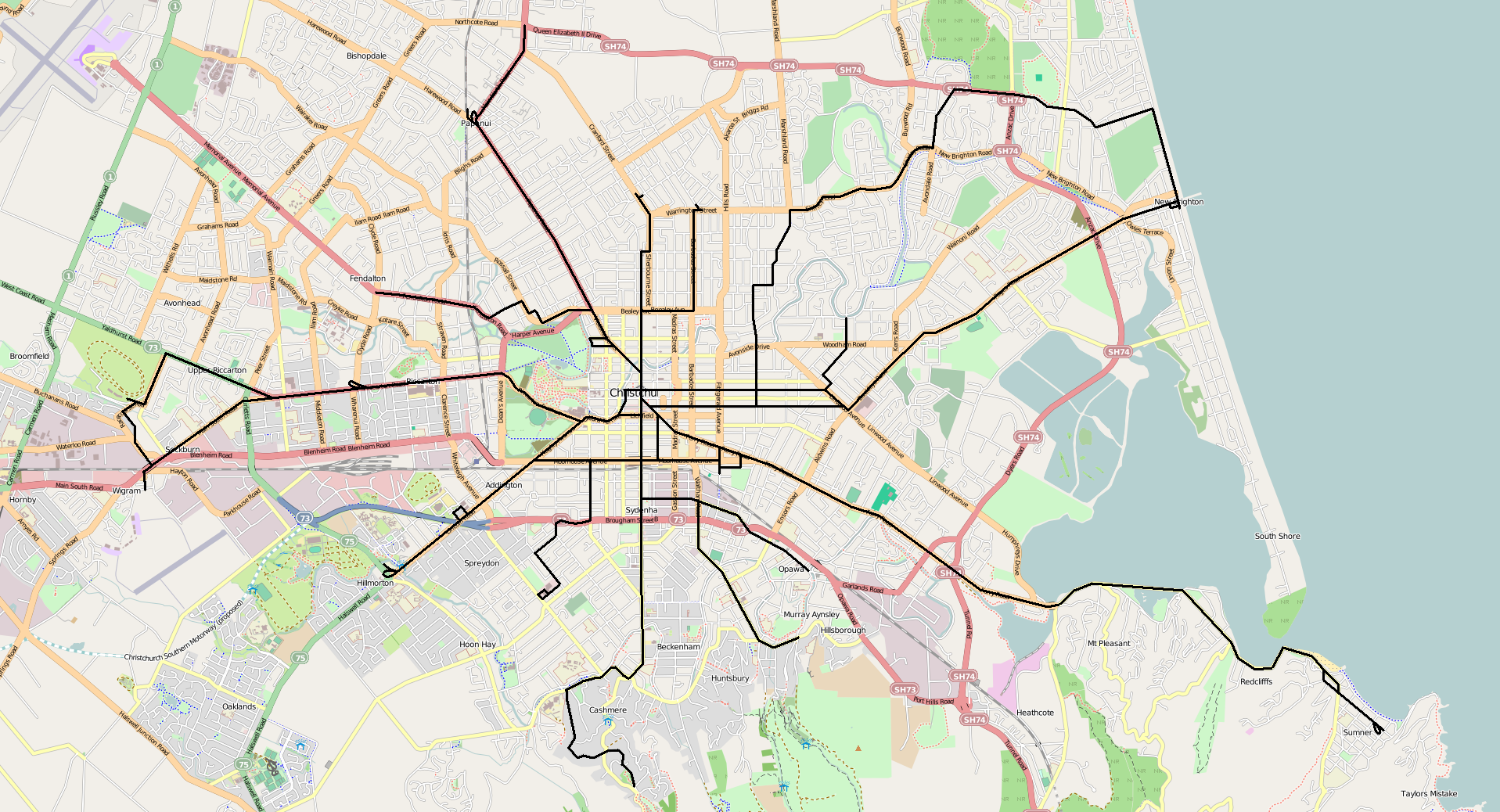
Tram route map

Over the first decade of operation, new lines or extensions were added to Edgeware Road (24 December 1906); Opawa (21 September 1909); Fendalton (20 November 1909); Cranford Street (1 July 1910); North Beach (1 October 1914); Spreydon (3 August 1911); Cashmere Hills (1 May 1912); Dallington (1 November 1912); from Papanui to Northcote (28 February 1913); St. Martins (7 April 1914); from Edgeware Road to St. Albans Park (19 July 1915); and from Riccarton to Plumpton Park (January 1916). A temporary loop line to North Hagley Park also operated for five months to serve the Christchurch International Exhibition from November 1906 – March 1907.

The early 1920s saw the last of the major construction to be undertaken on the tramlines with extensions to Barrington Street for the Spreydon line (August 1922) and the Lichfield Street connection (July 1922). It was also at around this time that the Board had proposed several other new lines to the Northeast Central City, South Brighton, and Bryndwr as well as a link between the St. Albans Line and North Beach Line, and a deviation in the Burwood area. These ideas never proceeded because the prevailing economic conditions made it impossible to justify the cost of them, with buses eventually being used as a cheaper alternative.

The first tram services to be withdrawn and replaced by buses were those to Northcote (30 September 1930), Marshland Road–North Beach (5 July 1931), and Richmond (17 December 1934) when the cost of keeping these lines open could not be justified. Other lines to be closed later that same decade due to economic constraints included Worcester Street, Dallington, and Wainoni in 1936. When the Board considered the future of the tram network after World War 2, a policy shift led to the progressive closure of the network and its replacement with buses as they became available. The first to go was the line to St. Martins (20 May 1946), followed by Fendalton and Opawa (6 February 1950), New Brighton (18 October 1952), Sumner (6 December 1952), Riccarton (14 June 1953), St. Albans Park and Spreydon (21 June 1953), Cranford Street and Lincoln Road (26 July 1953), and Papanui and Cashmere (11 September 1954).

=== Trolley bus network ===
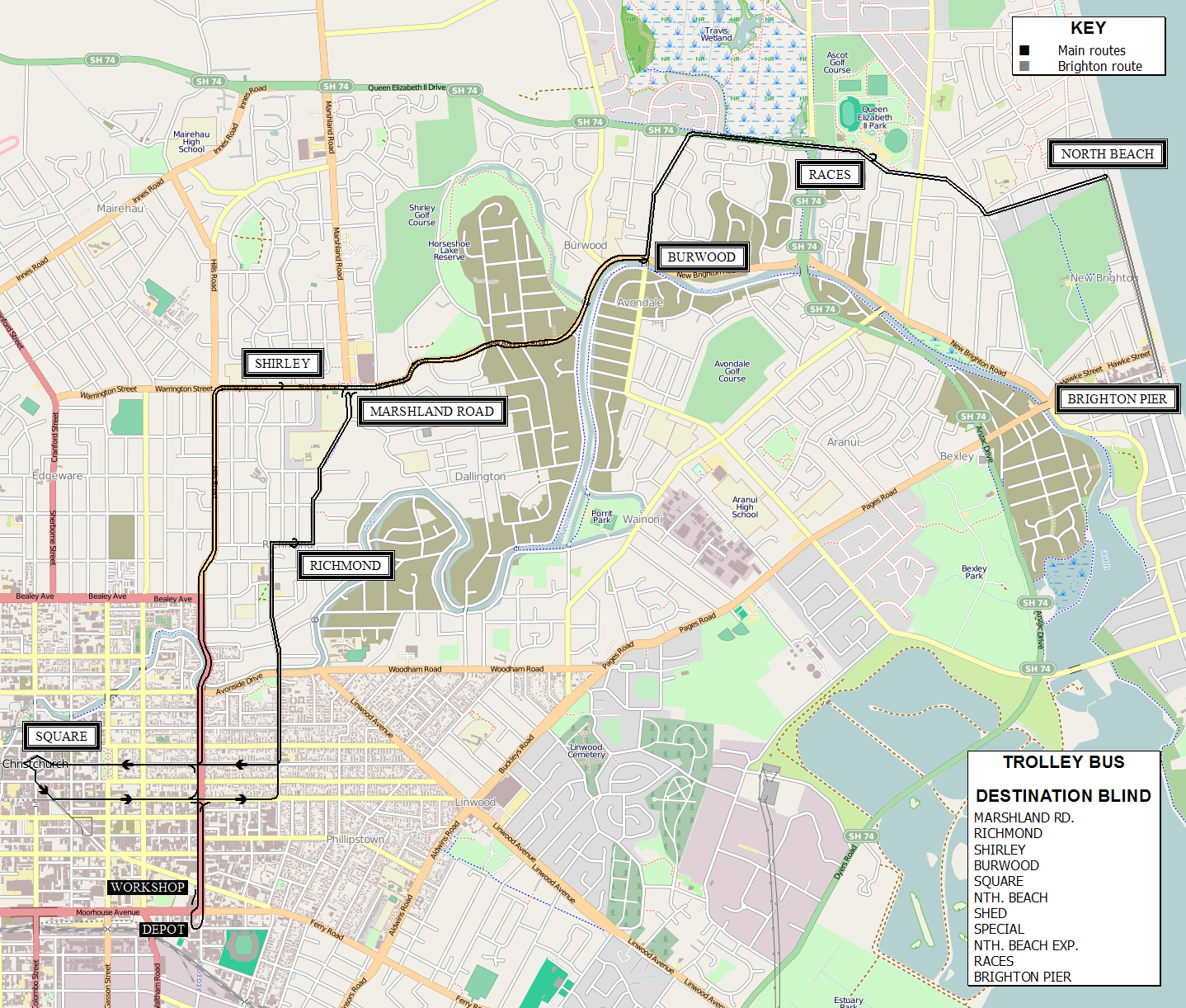
Trolley bus route map

The first service, to Shirley, commenced on 1 April 1931 and was later opened as far as the Brighton Pier via North Beach on 5 July 1931. This first route, though it was intended to replace the North Beach trams, actually followed a different path between Fitzgerald Avenue and Marshland Road. Patronage of the Marine Parade section was poor, leading to the truncation of services at North Beach from 31 May 1933.

When it came time to close the remainder of the North Beach tramline, the Board decided to replace the trams with trolley buses. The second line, to Marshland Road via Richmond, opened on 17 December 1934.

All inbound services entered the Cathedral Square terminus from Worcester Street and outbound services ran along High and Cashel Streets. The lines on Fitzgerald Avenue extended as far south as Moorhouse Avenue, running past and providing access to the Board's workshop (between Ferry Road and Moorhouse Avenue) for servicing and to the depot on Falsgrave Street for stabling. None of the trolley buses ever displayed route numbers, though route numbers were later assigned to some trolley bus routes and short workings for when diesel buses were used to assist.

The inflexibility of the trolley bus system and a desire to standardise on diesel buses led to the decision to withdraw the trolley buses in the 1950s. The short working to Shirley was discontinued on 16 July 1951 with the remaining services to Marshland Road via Richmond closing on 31 May 1956 and to North Beach on 8 November 1956.

=== 1 Papanui ===
Opened: 6 June 1905 (electric tram); Opened, exhibition loop: November 1906 (electric tram); Closed, exhibition loop: 16 April 1907 (electric tram); Opened, Northcote extension: 28 February 1913 (electric tram); Closed, Northcote extension: 30 September 1930 (electric tram); Opened, Northcote extension: 1 October 1930 (petrol bus); Abandoned, Northcote extension: 10 May 1932 (petrol bus); Closed: 11 September 1954 (electric tram); Opened: 11 September 1954 (diesel bus)

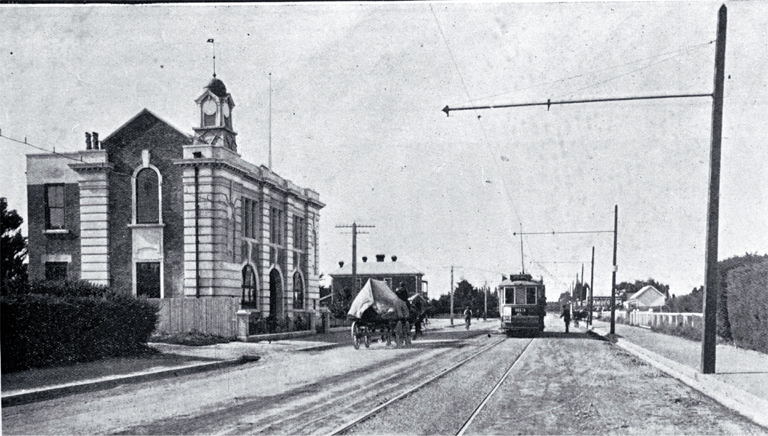
A tram on the Northcote extension

The Papanui Township was the first area in Christchurch to receive an electric tram service when the system was inaugurated in 1905. The line quickly proved its worth, becoming one of the most profitable lines in the tram network.

Buses first appeared on this route in the mid-1920s during the so-called "bus wars" when private bus operators decided to take on one of the Board's most lucrative services. Once the Board had seen off the competition on this route, it was not until 1930 that buses again made an appearance. The local council wanted to re-lay Main North Road, along which the tram line ran down one side, and gave the Board several options: to re-lay the tramline down the middle of the road, to double-track the line, or to remove the line. The Board could not countenance the re-laying of the line because of the cost and opted to abandon the tram service to Northcote. When permission to terminate the tram service without a plan for a replacement bus service was denied, the Board sought expressions of interest from private bus operators to run a feeder service to the terminus of its tramline in Papanui after rejecting other suggestions including that it should establish a trolley bus service on the route. None of the responses received were to the Board's liking, so it decided to run the service itself. On this basis, permission was granted to terminate the Northcote tram service and the Board's replacement bus service commenced the following day. It was never popular, with the necessity of having to transfer between buses and trams at Papanui being a common complaint, and after several service reductions were made in line with falling demand (including a short-lived Sunday service), the Board abandoned the route altogether in 1932 after coming to an arrangement with a private operator to take over the service.

Midland Motorways acquired the operator of the Northcote run in 1936 and maintained its own service there until the Board bought it out in 1982. When the Board withdrew trams from Papanui in 1954, it also tried to claim the right to operate the Northcote bus services. Midland was successful in retaining the right to operate its own service there, forcing the Board to run its Northcote service via a different route wholly within its own rating district. Once the Board acquired Midland Motorways it was able to run its own Northcote service via the original route along Northcote Road.

The first diesel buses on the Papanui route were introduced on 10 September 1951 as a temporary measure when work commenced on re-laying the top end of the Papanui tramline, with the intention of keeping the Papanui–Cashmere tram service running. Though the intention had been to re-lay the tramline as far as Leinster Road, work was stopped at Blighs Road once the Board realised the futility of investing more money in the tramway. After the decision had been made in January 1953 to use diesel buses on this route they were used in weekends, and on the day of the "last tram" buses had already taken over the route before the final tram returned to the depot. The route was extended several times after the trams were withdrawn, finally terminating at Trafford Street.

=== 2 Cashmere ===
Opened, to south end of Colombo Street: August 1905 (electric tram); Opened, to start of Hackthorne Road: December 1911 (electric tram); Opened, to Dyers Pass Road: February 1912 (electric tram); Opened, to Hills terminus: 1 May 1912 (electric tram); Opened, Barrington Street–Hills terminus: 10 April 1953 (diesel bus); Closed, Barrington Street–Hills terminus: 13 April 1953 (electric tram); Closed: 11 September 1954 (electric tram); Opened: 11 September 1954 (diesel bus)

Services to the Cashmere Hills were progressively converted to electric tram operation after the Board assumed control of the route from the Christchurch Tramway Company. Though trams were used to provide services on this route until the 1950s, there were several occasions on which buses were used.

Soon after the Board took delivery of a Ransomes trolley bus in 1931, they conducted trials with it on the Hills portion of the Cashmere route. The objective was to determine how trolley buses would perform on such terrain, though not intending to actually convert the route to trolley bus operation. The following year, buses temporarily replaced trams on this route during the tramway strike because of concerns about the replacement motormen the Board had taken on to operate the trams were not sufficiently skilled to safely operate a tram on the Hills section, and those supporting the strike had taken to sabotage to disrupt tram operation on the Hills section. Tram services were again temporarily replaced with buses during a power supply crisis from June to August 1947.

Following the conversion of the Spreydon route to bus operation on 22 June 1953, the Cashmere route temporarily became a through route with the Spreydon service in which some of the buses from Spreydon continued on along Barrington Street before proceeding to the Hills terminus. Once trams were also removed from the Cashmere route in 1954, these bus services reverted to the old tram routes though a new service was established that terminated at Macmillan Avenue via Dyers Pass Road.

With the opening of Princess Margaret Hospital on 31 August 1959 the route was altered to make the hospital a stop during visiting hours. The service's increasing popularity with visitors to the hospital ensured that by August 1965 all buses ran past the hospital.

=== 3 Sumner ===
Opened, to Heathcote Bridge: November 1905 (electric tram); Opened, to Head Street terminus: 29 April 1907 (electric tram); Closed: 6 December 1952 (electric tram); Opened: 6 December 1952 (diesel bus)

Upon assuming control of the Sumner line in 1905, the Board continued to operate the steam tram service it inherited from the Christchurch Tramway Company while the initial contract for electrification was still underway. From November of that year it ran electric tram services until conversion to bus operation in 1952.

Buses did make an appearance on this route while the trams were still running during the so-called "bus wars" when from 1925 both Inter City Motors and Suburban Motors ran their own private bus services along the route in an attempt to capture some of the Board's patronage. The Board responded by using its own buses to head off the competition and eventually acquired the operation of Suburban Motors in 1926.

The Sumner route was one of a few occasions on which a public ceremony was held to mark the conversion of one of the Board's tramway lines to bus operation. The first bus travelled from Cathedral Square to Sumner on the afternoon of 6 December 1952 where a crowd had gathered to witness several local dignitaries officiate the commencement of the new bus service. At the conclusion of the official function, the last tram made its way back to town.

Many improvements were made following the introduction of buses to the Sumner route. New destinations were served, catering for the travel requirements of local residents, students for several schools near the route, and visitors to the Jubilee Home in Woolston.

The day after trams ceased running on the Riccarton line, 15 June 1953, the Sumner bus service was extended to include the Riccarton route. This included the introduction of short workings to Smith Street (3S), Woolston (3W), and Redcliffs (3R), and peak-time express services stopping after Smith Street or Bamford Street.

Woolston bus services were rerouted in 1982 to terminate at Rutherford Street, replacing the 13R portion of the Opawa service that had also terminated there, over the earnest but unheeded objections of users of the 13R service. The separate Woolston service was discontinued in the late 1980s when the Mt. Pleasant service was rerouted along the end portion of that route.

=== 4 Cranford Street ===
Opened: 1 July 1910 (electric tram); Closed: 26 July 1953 (electric tram); Opened: 27 July 1953 (diesel bus)

The Cranford Street route was one of the new tramlines constructed and opened by the Board after it had electrified the lines it inherited from the private tramway companies. It remained a tram-only service until conversion to bus operation in 1953.

Initially, buses ran the route of the old tramline, terminating at Westminster Street. Some services ran an extended route through to Weston Road, replacing the previous Weston Road via Springfield Road service. A further extension of the route was implemented on 26 May 1958, with a new terminus at McFaddens Road. The unsuitable nature of the land beyond McFaddens Road for residential development meant that the terminus remained unchanged for the next two decades.

The acquisition of the remaining bus services of Midland Motorways by the Board in November 1982 gave it access to several towns and settlements north of Christchurch, which it apportioned to both the Papanui Road and Cranford Street routes. Cranford Street became such a busy thoroughfare for these services that it ceased to be a destination in its own right after 1982.

=== 5 Brighton ===
Opened, via Worcester Street: 4 August 1906 (electric tram); Opened, via Cashel Street: 1 November 1910 (electric tram); Closed: 18 October 1952 (electric tram); Opened: 18 October 1952 (diesel bus)

The Board acquired the privately operated tramline from the city to New Brighton in 1906 at which time it proceeded to electrify the line and commence its own service.

The first regular bus service to Brighton was provided by Inter City Motors during the "bus wars" of the mid-1920s. This was the first real competition to trams on the Brighton route and soon became a problem that demanded a response. In addition to improvements to the tram service, the Board decided to run its own bus service to counter that of Inter City Motors.

Services between Brighton and North Beach proved to be problematic for the Board and following the withdrawal of trams from this section in 1931 a replacement trolley bus service was introduced. It failed to attract a sufficient number of passengers and was withdrawn two years later. The Board had already tried running a trial bus service along this route, in September 1927, by extending the Pleasant Point service but the trial was unsuccessful. The next attempt in 1938, which had been designed to cater for shoppers and evening cinema patrons, also failed and like the 1927 trial was cancelled after less than one month in operation. However, the evening service continued on to 1946 at which time it was replaced by a private bus service provided by the cinema. The cinema service, including routes and times, was advertised with upcoming movies and lasted to 1964.

When a speedway opened on Rowan Avenue, Aranui in January 1949 its Saturday evening race meetings over the summer months were a popular fixture for many years. The number of trams required to convey patrons to the racecourse caused operational difficulties to such an extent that it proved to be impossible to maintain the regular timetable and consequently buses were typically used to replace trams on the Brighton line when race meetings were held. Race meetings also meant a busy time for the tram crews and because they didn't have time for their usual meal break, a special bus was provided by the Board to bring these crews into the city for a meal before returning them to the racecourse to bring the patrons home.

The end for trams on the Brighton line came on 18 October 1952 when the first bus of the replacement service departed Cathedral Square at 15:00. At the Brighton Post Office a ribbon had been strung across Seaview Road where the first bus and the last tram waited on either side. Once the formalities were concluded and the ribbon cut, the tram returned to the city and the bus completed its run to the pier, to be followed by another 13 of the fleet. The tram timetable remained in effect until the following Monday at which time a new timetable was introduced. The new service included short workings to Aldwins Road (5A) and Breezes Road (5B), and incorporated the old Pleasant Point service that later became known as South Brighton (5S).

One problem that had been the bane of the old tram service was the need to run through (semi-) rural areas where there were few, if any, fare-paying passengers. The residential development of Aranui and industrial development near Brighton resulted in increased patronage for the buses. To cater to demand, the Breezes Road bus route was altered to terminate in Rowan Avenue.

Brighton services were connected with other routes to provide cross-town links. From 25 May 1953 Brighton buses ran a combined route with the Mays Road service, which, while not as successful as the Board had hoped, remained in effect for nearly two decades. Next, Brighton services were connected to the Fendalton route from 1972, which proved to be more successful, and they remained this way until deregulation.

=== 6/6D/6W Worcester Street/Dallington/Wainoni ===
Trams on the Worcester Street and Dallington lines were some of the first to be withdrawn by the Board, being the first tram routes to be replaced by diesel buses on 2 November 1936. It was also at this time that the Wainoni route operated by Inter City, a company the Board had acquired the previous year, was incorporated into the Board's own Worcester Street and Dallington routes.

It was with the introduction of these routes that the Board also changed its policy on route numbering. Previously, an unadorned route number had indicated that a conveyance would run the full length of the route, with the addition of letters to indicate short workings. Now, the reverse applied, with the number six used for the shortest part of the service and 6D and 6W used for extended routes, conflicting with the previous use of number 6 for the Dallington tram and 6W for the Worcester Street tram. This, combined with the ambiguity of "6D" as a route number (to many, 6D was thought to be the fare), caused much confusion amongst passengers.

Unlike most other services run by the Board, the number 6 routes ran through Cathedral Square to either the railway station or Lichfield Street. This arrangement lasted until October 1942 when wartime restrictions resulted in most trips to the railway station terminating at Lichfield Street instead.

=== 6 Worcester Street ===
Opened: March 1906 (electric tram); Closed: 1 November 1936 (electric tram); Opened: 2 November 1936 (diesel bus)

Much of the Worcester Street route was shared with other services but despite this, it was sufficiently well patronised to justify a half-hourly weekday service and less frequent Saturday services. Originally terminated at the corner of Linwood Avenue and Buckleys Road, it was extended to serve post-war development in Bromley by establishing a new terminus along Linwood Avenue at Hargood Street on 14 June 1948. Buses running to this new terminus were designated Bromley (6B).

The Bromley service's Railway Station link became obsolete with the decline in passenger rail traffic and the fact that many other bus routes ran past the Railway Station. With a dedicated Railway Station service no longer required, the Bromley and Beckenham routes were linked in the 1980s.

=== 6D Dallington ===
Opened: 1 November 1912 (electric tram); Closed: 1 November 1936 (electric tram); Opened: 2 November 1936 (diesel bus)

Trams first served Dallington when the Board opened an extension of the Worcester Street line to the suburb in 1912. It was one of the last tramlines to be built in Christchurch and also one of the first to be closed by the Board.

At first, patronage was light enough that express services were not required. When peak loadings on the Wainoni route were particularly heavy, Dallington buses were used to transfer passengers from their own route to Wainoni services at Woodham Road, an arrangement that lasted until August 1946.

The bus route initially followed the old tramline up Gloucester Street to terminate at Avonside Drive. While the tramline was in operation it was always worked with traditional double cab tramcars, as there was no room at the terminus to install a turning facility for one-man tram operation. The same issue caused problems for bus drivers for many years. The original wooden Dallington Bridge at the end of Gloucester Street had a severe weight limit and drivers were advised that they were not permitted to encroach onto the bridge. This made it difficult to turn buses for the return journey and it was not until improvements were made in Avonside Drive near the bridge that the manoeuvre could be carried out without reversing.

Route extensions were not possible until 1954 when the old bridge was replaced at which time the route was extended to McBratneys Road. Further extensions included Ferner Street (5 August 1957), Locksley Avenue (29 September 1958), and select peak-time services to the intersection of Avonside Drive and Torlesse Street (December 1968). The Dallington route was also linked to cross-town services including Bryndwr from October 1955 and to Avonside from 1980/81 with an extension to Liggins Street and later to Bampton Street from 1984.

=== 6W Wainoni ===
Opened: 2 November 1936 (diesel bus)

Wainoni first received a bus service in January 1926 during the "bus wars" when Inter City established a through service to North Beach. This service was later taken over by the Board when it acquired the company in October 1935, and became a dedicated Wainoni service when the portion of the old North Beach run between the Bower Hotel and North Beach was abandoned on 10 February 1936. On 2 November 1936 the route was altered to use Worcester Street (abandoning the Inter City route via Hereford Street) and a new timetable was adopted, combining its services with those of the Worcester Street and Dallington routes.

Weight restrictions on the old Bower Bridge limited the number of passengers that buses could carry over the bridge. Work on a new bridge started in August 1941 with construction of pre-cast concrete piles and from 8 December 1941 to 17 August 1942 the bridge was closed to all but pedestrian traffic to allow for the old bridge to be dismantled as the new bridge was erected. The opening of the new bridge allowed for all previous loading restrictions to be rescinded.

At first, loadings in the Wainoni area were light enough that an hourly service frequency sufficed, even at peak times. The route's link with the Railway Station, however, ensured that buses were typically at capacity by Cathedral Square, whereupon Dallington buses would be used to transfer passengers to Woodham Road to catch a Wainoni service. There were still no evening services, but not for lack of trying, as an unpopular Friday night service introduced in 1937 was withdrawn after about 3 months, and a service designed for cinema patrons in 1941 had to be withdrawn the following year for wartime fuel rationing. From mid-1949 until 1952 the evening services on Fridays and Saturdays continued on to South Brighton. It was not until September 1951 that Sunday services were introduced.

Route extensions included moving the terminus to the intersection of New Brighton Road and Palmers Road on 1 January 1962 and later into the suburb of Parklands, and on 4 September 1967 to Niven Street via Breezes Road and Avondale Road. This route was again extended once the old Avondale Road Bridge was replaced, terminating at Burwood Hospital.

Cross-town links included the Wharenui route from October 1955 to 4 September 1967 at which point the service terminated at Cathedral Square, and with the Mays Road route from 1972.

=== 7 Lincoln Road ===
Opened: 8 February 1906 (electric tram); Closed: 26 July 1953 (electric tram); Opened: 27 July 1953 (diesel bus)

The Lincoln Road route was inherited from the Christchurch Tramway Company and services initially provided by the Board using steam trams until electric trams were introduced on the line in 1906. This remained a tram service until conversion to bus operation in 1953.

With the introduction of bus services, the old tram route was retained for most services but some ran an extended route to a new terminus at the intersection of Hoon Hay Road and Lewis Street to serve a rapidly growing residential area. The route was split on 30 May 1960 when it was extended to a new terminus at Sparks Road/Victors Road and a terminus added at Halswell Road/Rowley Avenue. As with the preceding tram service, this route was always combined with the Cranford Street route.

=== 8 Riccarton ===
Opened, to Clyde Road: November 1905 (electric tram); Opened, to Riccarton Racecourse: 12 March 1906 (electric tram); Closed: 14 June 1953 (electric tram); Opened: 15 June 1953 (diesel bus)

Riccarton was one of the first new tramlines to open, initially using steam traction from 2 November 1905, and later electric trams as electrification proceeded to the terminus. The Board's Riccarton bus service did not come until nearly five decades later when they replaced the trams on 15 June 1953. This new service formed part of a cross-town service with the Sumner route. Space constraints in Cathedral Square meant that the central city terminus of the route was located on Worcester Street outside the Avon cinema.

The bus route only followed the route of the tramline as far as the western end of Riccarton Road where it split into two legs. Some buses carried on to the Racecourse via Yaldhurst and Racecourse Roads whilst the others ran on to Buchanans Road. Residential development to the west of the city soon ensued and to meet the demand for public transport services the Yaldhurst leg was extended to terminate at Cutts Road. Further extensions included to Fovant Street on 4 June 1962 and Bentley Street on 4 June 1966. A new leg was created along Avonhead Road to Maidstone Road on 4 December 1959 but later cancelled in favour of extending the Creyke Road route. The Buchanans Road leg was also extended to match residential development, to Wycola Avenue from 30 September 1957, and later down Gilberthorpes Road to connect with Templeton buses in Islington.

There were two short workings on the Riccarton route, to Clyde Road (8C) and Church Corner (8B). These were linked to the short workings on the Sumner route and were popular throughout the day, and complemented the express services at peak times.

8H Ran to Hornby, terminating at Denton Park where there was an off-road turning loop.

=== 9 Fendalton ===
Opened, to Holmwood Road: November 1909 (electric tram); Opened, to Clyde Road: 18 December 1912 (electric tram); Closed: 5 February 1950 (electric tram); Opened: 6 February 1950 (diesel bus)

Trams provided public transport services to Fendalton for four decades from 1909 until being withdrawn in 1950. Following the successful introduction of diesel buses on the Worcester Street, Dallington, and Railway Station routes in 1936, the Board made plans in 1938 to introduce them to other lightly patronised tramlines, specifically St. Martins and Fendalton/Opawa. Though buses did replace trams for a short time on the St. Martins route, the intervention of World War 2 scuttled the Board's plans to withdraw the Fendalton and Opawa tram service due to restrictions on supplies and the unavailability of new vehicles.

When the Board was next able to consider the issue of bus replacement of tram services following World War 2, the Fendalton/Opawa tram service was one of the first to go. Though the trams were not withdrawn until 5 February 1950, buses had been used on the Fendalton route for a number of years. Sunday services had already been switched to bus operation from 10 April 1949, and in December a route to Clyde Road via Ilam Road had started to serve State housing developments. This latter service became part of the Fendalton route when the new bus timetable was introduced on 6 February 1950.

Extensions to the Fendalton service included to Truman Road (mid-1950s), to Grahams Road (30 June 1958), to Kendal Avenue (2 December 1963), and finally Burnside Crescent (7 December 1964). This portion of the route mostly served State housing and consequently, buses had to cater for the large number of young children living in the area.

Midland Motorways held a licence to operate bus services on Memorial Avenue out to the Airport, a situation that prevented the Board from extending the Fendalton service along this route. When it obtained its own licence for Memorial Avenue, services were extended to Ilam Road from 6 January 1958. Further extensions included Grahams Road (30 June 1958), Avonhead Road (2 December 1963), and Withells Road (1977). The Fendalton route's cross-town link was changed to Brighton in 1972, ending its association with Opawa.

=== 10 Marshland Road and Richmond ===
Opened: 27 December 1906 (steam tram); Opened: 15 August 1910 (electric tram); Closed: 16 August 1934 (electric tram); Opened: 17 December 1934 (trolley bus); Closed: 30 May 1956 (trolley bus); Opened: 31 May 1956 (diesel bus)

Christchurch's second trolley bus line opened on 17 December 1934. It followed the North Beach tramline through Richmond as far as Marshland Road where it met but was not physically joined to the existing trolley bus line to North Beach. There was a short working to the intersection of North Avon Road and Tweed Street.

As with trolley buses on the North Beach service, those used on the Richmond run were not equipped to display route numbers. This caused confusion when, in the late 1930s, diesel buses were used on this route to augment capacity and did show route numbers. In this case, buses used the route number 10, with 10T used for the short working to Tweed Street.

For a short time following the commencement of a new Shirley service on 15 January 1951, North Beach trolley buses ran via the Richmond route, replacing the Marshland Road via Richmond service. The two separate trolley bus routes were reinstated on 16 July 1951.

As the Board's post-war programme of fleet upgrades and modernisation neared its zenith in the 1950s, it was decided to withdraw the trolley bus system and focus on diesel buses. Consequently, the last trolley bus service to Marshland Road ran on 30 May 1956.

The replacement diesel bus service was extended several times, first to Joy Street from 25 August 1958, then to Briggs Road, and throughout the 1980s it followed the development of the north-eastern suburbs through Burwood, Parklands, Waimairi Beach, and North Beach to end up at New Brighton. A cross-town link with the Opawa route was established in December 1972 that lasted to 1980/81 when it was switched to a combined Marshland Road–Avonhead route.

=== 11 Avonside ===
Opened: 13 January 1926 (petrol bus)

A motor omnibus service run by C. R. Brown to Avonside commenced operation in the early 1920s. Its route followed Armagh Street, Brittan Street, and Patten Street to terminate on Retreat Road. When Brown tried to renew his licence in June 1926, the Board used its authority under the Motor Omnibus Traffic Act 1926 to compulsorily acquire his business. After performing due diligence on the operation, the Board decided not to continue the service, in part because they were hoping to also acquire the business of Inter City Motors and thereby establish a new route serving North Beach, Wainoni, and Avonside.

When their attempt to purchase Inter City Motors was rebuffed, they acquiesced to local pressure and decided to run their own Avonside service, which started on 19 December 1927. It never distinguished itself financially and in 1929 it was decided to put the service out for tender. The tender was awarded to W. C. Sanders who took over the running of the service on 11 July 1929 using a White bus he had agreed to purchase from the Board. This also coincided with an extension of the route along Kellar Street (previously Leighton Street) and Morris Street west to terminate at Avonside Drive. A special route via England Street (previously Rolleston Street) and Woodham Road was used when events were held at Wilding Park.

Sanders' contract expired on 11 July 1933 and the Board, being wary of his financial position, decided not to renew it and instead offered it to two of his drivers, Ted Pycroft and Jim Henderson. They assumed responsibility for the service and continued operations using a Republic bus provided by the Board. Over the next two decades there were a succession of private operators and vehicles including the introduction of a Thornycroft in 1937 and a Ford V8 in 1942.

With the post-war easing of restrictions on the supply of fuel, additional services were provided on the Avonside route. The route was also extended along Robson Avenue, Galbraith Avenue, and Morris Street from 18 October 1948 to serve new residential development. New patronage required additional capacity and so to cater for the demand an AEC Q bus was used on Saturdays. As the Qs were only equipped to display route numbers and not destinations, the route number 11 was assigned to Avonside.

The Board resumed control of the Avonside service on 18 June 1951 at which time the drivers that had been operating the service became employees of the Board. When the Dallington route assimilated the Avonside service in 1980/81, Avonside ceased to be a destination in its own right though the route number 11 remained in use for buses travelling through the area.

=== 12 St. Martins ===
Opened: 7 April 1914 (electric tram); Closed: 5 January 1941 (electric tram); Opened: 6 January 1941 (diesel bus); Re-opened: 6 July 1942 (electric tram); Closed: 19 May 1946 (electric tram); Re-opened: 20 May 1946 (diesel and petrol bus)

Despite being the last tramline constructed and opened by the Board, St. Martins was never particularly busy and by the 1930s had deteriorated to the point where it was being considered for closure. Following the successful introduction of diesel buses in 1936, the Board made plans in 1938 to use them to replace tram services on other routes, including St. Martins. When a sufficient number of vehicles were available, the tram service was withdrawn on 5 January 1941 and the bus service commenced the next day, following the tram route and using the same stops as the trams. New services were soon added to the timetable including express services at peak times.

The imposition of restrictions on the Board's operations due to World War 2 and the difficulty in obtaining parts and supplies for its buses led to the withdrawal of the St. Martins bus service and the reintroduction of trams on 6 July 1942, despite the poor condition of the tram track. This situation lasted until the trams were withdrawn for the second time on 19 May 1946 and the reintroduction of the bus service the next day using both petrol and diesel vehicles.

Heading out to St. Martins, the new bus route used Manchester Street instead of Colombo Street as previously, and at Moorhouse Avenue buses either turned left to go down Waltham Road past the Railway Station, or right to head down Colombo Street and Brougham Street through the Sydenham shopping precinct. Bus drivers were tasked with counting passengers using the Sydenham route and, following analysis of the data obtained, it was decided to discontinue the Sydenham deviation, with all buses using Waltham Road from 12 December 1949.

From 19 May 1947 to 20 February 1949 the St. Martins route was linked with the Somerfield route on weekdays only. A new route was created in December 1984 combining the St. Martins and Huntsbury routes.

=== 13 Opawa ===
Opened: 21 September 1909 (electric tram); Closed: 5 February 1950 (electric tram); Opened: 6 February 1950 (diesel bus)

Services to Opawa commenced on 14 March 1907 using steam-hauled trams. Electric trams followed in 1909 and, despite an attempt to replace them with buses in the 1930s, remained in service for four decades. Bus services began with Sunday services from 10 April 1949 and concluded with complete bus replacement on 6 February 1950. Two extensions of the Opawa route were established only months after the new bus service started: to Hillsborough, terminating at Grange Street from Opawa Road (13H); and to the Radley area (Woolston), terminating on Rutherford Street from Garlands Road (13R). Both of these changes, effective 28 August 1950, were intended to serve areas of new residential development as well as the industrial complex between Rutherford Street and Bamford Street. A further extension of the Hillsborough service was implemented on 30 June 1969, terminating at Brabourne Road on Opawa Road.

Coinciding with the new cross-town link established between Fendalton and Brighton in December 1972, the Woolston portion of the Opawa service was joined to the Marshland Road route. Also, as the Lyttelton suburban rail services had recently ceased operation, the Lyttelton bus service was rerouted to follow the railway line and collect passengers from around the railway stations, and in so doing largely followed the Hillsborough section of the Opawa service.

The Marshland Road and Opawa routes were de-linked in 1980–81, and the Woolston section of the Opawa service was terminated when the area became served by a change to the Woolston service. The similarity of the Opawa and Lyttelton routes had resulted in their amalgamation by December 1984 and the route number 13 was no longer used.

=== 14 Spreydon ===
Opened, to Strickland Street: 3 August 1911 (electric tram); Opened, to Coronation Street: September 1915 (electric tram); Opened, to Barrington Street: August 1922 (electric tram); Closed: 21 June 1953 (electric tram); Opened: 22 June 1953 (diesel bus)

Spreydon was one of the later tram routes to open, and later had the distinction of being the last tram route on which a section of new tramline was constructed (the Barrington Street extension in 1922). Trams were withdrawn from the Spreydon route on 21 June 1953 and replaced with buses the following day. The bus route ran to a new terminus beyond the end of the tramline, at the intersection of Barrington and Somerfield Streets. The Somerfield bus route, which had terminated here, was redirected.

A new leg to the Spreydon route was created, down Selwyn Street to the intersection with Somerfield Street. This was joined on 15 September 1958 with the first route by using Somerfield Street to create a loop, with buses travelling in both directions. Simeon Street and Coronation Street were removed from the route on 17 December 1984 and a new terminus established at the intersection of Barrington and Athelstan Streets.

=== 15 Railway Station ===
Opened, via Manchester Street: 6 June 1905 (electric tram); Opened, via Colombo Street: 4 July 1905 (electric tram); Closed, via Manchester Street: 6 April 1932 (electric tram); Closed, via Colombo Street: 1 November 1936 (electric tram); Opened: 2 November 1936 (diesel bus)

Trams operated a dedicated service between the central city and Railway Station until they were withdrawn from this route, along with the number 6 trams, on 1 November 1936. The replacement was the city's first diesel bus service, which was introduced as an economy measure to reduce expenditure on lightly trafficked routes. The tram route via Manchester Street had closed 2½ years earlier and since then trams to the Railway Station had used Colombo Street.

The Board's bus service, introduced on 2 November 1936, continued to be complemented by trams, which provided an irregular service to the Railway Station as they travelled past on their way to or from the Falsgrave Street depot.

Being a dedicated link to the Railway Station, the number 6 buses had been timed to meet arriving trains from various locations around Christchurch. As more routes were converted to bus operation, some were routed past the Railway Station and were able to alleviate some of this load. The Worcester Street route remained linked to the Railway Station after the Dallington and Wainoni routes were assigned to new cross-town services with the Bryndwr and Wharenui routes respectively in October 1955.

The number of people needing to access the Railway Station declined along with the use of passenger rail around Christchurch. The last suburban rail service ran on 30 April 1976 and the final local service followed a few months later on 14 September. By the early 1980s the dedicated Railway Station bus service had become obsolete and was withdrawn, leaving only those buses that frequented the railway station in passing.

=== 16 St. Albans Park ===
Opened, to Edgeware Road: 24 December 1906 (electric tram); Opened, to terminus: 19 July 1915 (electric tram); Closed: 21 June 1953 (electric tram); Opened: 22 June 1953 (diesel bus)

The Board's bus service to St. Albans Park started on 22 June 1953, a day after the last St. Albans tram. It ran to a new route that followed the tramline, but continued on to a new terminus at Ranger Street via Flockton Street, Kensington Avenue, and Philpotts Road. An existing service that had commenced in 1949 along Springfield Road and Weston Road was truncated at Cranford Street. In the central city, buses initially followed the one-way streets but from the mid-1960s they were rerouted to Manchester Street and Peterborough Street.

The withdrawal of the trams afforded the City Council an opportunity to reconfigure Bealey Avenue. Traffic had previously travelled in both directions either side of the median strip with trams running on double track in the northern carriageway. When buses were introduced on the route the Avenue was changed to have eastbound traffic on the northern side and westbound traffic on the southern side.

A new service commenced on 5 August 1957 that continued down Westminster Street to terminate at Hills Road.

The Ranger Street terminus of the original route was changed in January 1959 by turning it into a loop around some local streets to avoid problems that drivers had had with turning their vehicles for the return journey.

=== 17 Bryndwr ===
Opened: 12 January 1925 (petrol bus), 2 November 1936 (diesel bus)

Bryndwr was one of the areas the Board had hoped to construct a new tramline for in the 1920s, but was prevented from doing so by economic conditions. When the Board failed to provide its own service to the suburb, the private operator W. C. Sanders filled the gap with a point-to-point service linking Bryndwr and Harewood from 1924. The Board was desirous of running its own Bryndwr service for which it had ordered Tilling-Stevens buses. In the meantime, it commenced operations using a recently acquired White bus on 12 January 1925. When this bus had to be deployed elsewhere during the "bus wars," the service had to be continued with vehicles from the disparate collection still in the Board's possession until they were able to take delivery of the Tilling-Stevens buses in late 1925.

The original route started from Cathedral Square and ran along Colombo Street, Armagh Street, Park Terrace, through the Carlton Mill area, and up Rossall Street to the intersection of Glandovey Road and Strowan Road. From here, buses alternated between travelling in a clockwise or anti-clockwise direction around the circuit formed by Glandovey Road, Idris Road, Wairakei Road (previously Wairarapa Road), and Strowan Road. Inbound services entered Cathedral Square from Worcester Street rather than Colombo Street. Timetabled services ran Monday to Saturday, no Sunday service.

Pre-war extensions to the Bryndwr route included a trial of services to Windermere Road from Idris Road in November 1927 and in July 1931 having select services continuing on down Wairarapa Road to either Ilam Road or Blighs Road.

Bryndwr was one of several routes to switch to diesel bus operation on 2 November 1936 when AEC Q buses commenced operation. As the "Q"s required a route number to indicate their destination, the number 17 was used for buses going as far as Idris Road and Wairarapa Road, and those travelling on used the route number 17E. Route number 17 had previously been assigned to the proposed Bryndwr tram route when new destination roll blinds were produced in 1921. Later fleet upgrades included the introduction of AEC Regal IV to the Bryndwr route to replace the "Q"s, and the replacement of the Mark IVs with the Long Reliance in 1958. It was not until the early 1980s that Long Reliances were retired after which a variety of Bristols and MANs were used.

A cross-town service between Bryndwr and Dallington was established in October 1955.

Extensions to the Wairakei Road leg continued apace with the terminus moving to Greers Road on 1 May 1950 and further expanded in March 1951, Grahams Road (September 1958), Kendall Avenue (February 1960), Charlcott Street (May 1962), Breens Road (February 1967), and finally to Sheffield Crescent where industrial development had taken place in the late 1970s/early 1980s. Services to Aorangi Road were not able to proceed on to Greers Road until February 1960 following the completion of Condell Avenue. Further extensions to this leg followed on 14 September 1964 to Leacroft Street by way of Kilburn Street and Isleworth Road and in 1982 to the intersection of Sawyers Arms Road and Crofton Road by way of Breens Road and Gardiners Road.

=== 18 Springfield Road ===
Opened: 28 January 1925 (petrol bus), 2 November 1936 (diesel bus)

In January 1925 Inter City Motor Service started a bus service to Springfield Road, having recently discontinued its service to Papanui. The Board viewed this move as a threat to its business and responded by starting its own bus service to the area on 28 January 1925 using hired vehicles. The single bus on offer from Inter City Motors was unable to compete against the two deployed by the Board and so the Inter City Motors service was quickly withdrawn. It was not until later in the year that the Board was able to take delivery of additional buses for its own fleet and relieve itself of the considerable expense of hiring buses from private operators. Two of these contractors later established their own service to Springfield Road in competition with the Board along the route that had been used by Inter City Motors. The Board acquired their business the following year.

Services actually ran as far as Mays Road, and Springfield Road was one of the main thoroughfares. At first, buses started from Cathedral Square and traversed Victoria Street, Durham Street, Springfield Road, Somme Street, Hawkesbury Avenue, Browns Road and Bretts Road on their way to Mays Road. The Mays Road destination was removed in May 1926, with services looping around the block of Bretts Road, Knowles Street, and Rutland Street. Mays Road was reinstated in March 1927 as an extended circuit whilst retaining Knowles Street for some services, but from September the Mays Road circuit was used by all services, alternating between Bretts Road and Rutland Street for outbound journeys.

A variety of petrol buses from the Board's fleet were used on this route. They were supplanted on 2 November 1936 by AEC Regal half-cab diesel buses. It was also at this time that route numbers were allocated to the Springfield Road services, with those using Rutland Street known as 18R and via Bretts Road as 18B.

Apart from a short-lived service to Weston Road, this route remained unaltered after the 1920s. It was part of two cross-town links, from 25 May 1953 with the Brighton route and from late 1972 with the Wainoni route. By the 1950s the route had become known as the Mays Road service.

=== 18W Weston Road ===
Opened: 14 February 1949 (diesel bus); Closed: 27 July 1953

One of many areas to experience residential development in post-World War 2 Christchurch was a strip of land running southwest – northeast between Innes Road and McFaddens Road. This area was not well served by public transport, with the nearest tramlines being those to Cranford Street and St. Albans Park. There was no prospect of these lines being extended, as an earlier proposal from the 1920s to link the St. Albans Park line to the North Beach line had been scrapped. For either of these routes to connect to this area the trams would first have to be withdrawn.

As a temporary solution, it was decided to extend the Springfield Road service into this area. Starting from 14 February 1949, every other Springfield Road bus turned off Rutland Street into Weston Road, ending its run at Cranford Street. The terminus of this route followed the growth of residential development eastwards, moving to Jameson Avenue by 20 June 1949 and to Philpotts Road via Nancy Avenue and Ranger Street on 8 December 1952. Patronage was regularly assessed to ensure the service's continued viability.

Despite the indirect nature of the route to the central city, it maintained its popularity with local residents. When the St. Albans Park tramline closed, the replacement bus service followed an extended route to the intersection of Philpotts Road and Ranger Street from 22 June 1953. As this was also the terminus of the 18W service, its route was truncated at Cranford Street. Just one month later following the replacement of the Cranford Street tramline with an extended bus route terminating at Weston Road on 27 July 1953, the 18W service was cancelled. The number 18 buses resumed their original routes to Mays Road.

=== 19 North Beach ===
Opened, to Burwood: 15 August 1910 (electric tram); Opened, Burwood–North Beach and Pier: 1 October 1914 (electric tram); Opened, to Shirley: 15 January 1925 (petrol bus); Closed, Marshland Road–terminus: 22 August 1927 (electric tram); Re-opened, Marshland Road–terminus: 1 October 1928 (electric tram); Opened, to Shirley: 1 April 1931 (trolley bus); Closed, Marshland Road–terminus: 4 July 1931 (electric tram); Opened, Shirley–North Beach and Brighton Pier: 5 July 1931 (trolley bus); Closed, North Beach–Brighton Pier: 13 May 1933 (trolley bus); Closed: 8 November 1956 (trolley bus); Opened: 8 November 1956 (diesel bus)

Public demand for improved transport services to the suburb of Shirley prompted the Board to consider its options in the 1920s. It had proposed a new tramline connecting the St. Albans Park line to the North Beach line along Warrington Street and Shirley Road but, like other proposed tramlines at the time, the idea had to be dropped due to economic conditions. It therefore decided to start its own bus service and, using a vehicle hired from private operator W. C. Sanders, commenced services on 15 January 1925. The route initially started from a terminus near the intersection of Colombo Street and Gloucester Street, from where it followed Manchester Street, Oxford Terrace, Kilmore Street, Fitzgerald Avenue, Hills Road, and Warden Street, where it terminated in a circuit around Chancellor Street, Shirley Road, and Slater Street. Inbound services returned along Armagh Street. Within the first two months the City terminus had been relocated to The Square. In using Manchester Street, Oxford Terrace, and Kilmore Street, the service followed the route of the proposed Northeast City tramline. Services ran on Mondays to Saturdays, no Sunday service.

Christchurch's first trolley bus service commenced operation to Shirley on 1 April 1931, later extended to North Beach and the Brighton Pier on 5 July 1931. The route, starting from Cathedral Square, ran along High Street, Cashel Street, Fitzgerald Avenue, Hills Road, and Shirley Road where the trolley bus line met the old North Beach tramline at Marshland Road and followed it to the terminus. Inbound services entered The Square from Worcester Street. Short workings to the intersection of Shirley Road and Stapletons Road, Burwood, and eventually at the New Brighton Racecourse were provided for with loops in the overhead lines. When the second trolley bus service to Richmond opened in 1934, both routes shared the line down Cashel Street to Fitzgerald Avenue.

At its greatest extent, the trolley bus line ran down Marine Parade, like the North Beach tramline before it, to connect with the Brighton tramline at the Pier. This part of the route was never successful so the line was truncated at North Beach on 13 May 1933. The tramline at the North Beach end of the route along Marine Parade and as far back as Bassett Street was, however, left in place to be used for special events at the Racecourse. On such occasions the trolley buses were not expected to cope with the crowds along the regular North Beach route so capacity was augmented by running extra trams up the Brighton tramline then back along the eastern end of the North Beach tramline to a point where they were met by trolley buses running shuttles to the Racecourse.

As on Bealey Avenue, traffic ran in both directions on either side of the median strip on Fitzgerald Avenue. Trolley buses used the western carriageway between the Moorhouse Avenue depot and Kilmore Street, and the eastern carriageway between Heywood Terrace and Bealey Avenue. It was not until the withdrawal of the trolley buses that Fitzgerald Avenue could be converted to one direction per carriageway.

A short-lived extension was started on 25 May 1936 using a petrol bus that was run out to North Beach from the city and back on scheduled services every day. During the day, it connected with trolley buses at the Ozone Corner and ran up Marine Parade to Effingham Street (previously Berry Street). The trial failed to attract sufficient interest and the service was cancelled a couple of months later on 31 July.

Trolley buses were identified only by their destinations, as they were not equipped to display route numbers. Only when diesel buses were called upon to augment capacity did route numbers become necessary and so the number 19 was assigned to the North Beach service. Short workings to Shirley and Burwood were assigned 19S and 19B respectively.

A new residential development north of Shirley Road attracted the attention of the Board in 1951. It was decided to establish a new bus service to the area and, as the Board was not interested in extending the trolley bus network, it was started on 15 January 1951 using petrol and diesel buses. The route ran to Acheson Avenue via Emmett Street, travelling under trolley bus lines much of the way. As the point at which this new service turned off Shirley Road into Emmett Street was close to where the Marshland Road via Richmond trolley bus route met the North Beach line, North Beach trolley buses were diverted at the same time to run via Richmond and the Richmond trolley bus service was suspended. A few months later on 16 July the trolley buses reverted to their previous routes but the short working to Shirley was cancelled.

Further development in the Emmett Block area and neighbouring suburbs led to extensions of the Shirley bus service, including to Voss Street via Orcades Street and Quinns Road (28 April 1958), up Olivine Street (December 1959), and to the intersection of Marshland Road and Briggs Road (3 December 1962).

The North Beach service remained largely unaltered until the trolley buses were replaced with their diesel counterparts on 8 November 1956 and it was only then that modifications to the route could be considered. The first was to relocate the Burwood terminus to the intersection of Bassett Street and Parnwell Street (24 August 1957) followed by a deviation around Lake Terrace Road, Burwood Road, and Travis Road before reaching the terminus (5 October 1964), and the inclusion of Burwood Hospital from Burwood Road and Mairehau Road on 13 October 1966.

A cross-town service between Burwood and Springs Road (previously Wharenui) was established on 4 September 1967.

There were also alterations at the North Beach end of the route, including: around Bower Avenue and Marriotts Road from December 1958; along Marine Parade to Pacific Street from December 1959; and an extended circuit for select services only around Bower Avenue, Beach Road, and Marine Parade to serve the suburb of Waimairi Beach from 3 July 1961. The growing importance of New Brighton as a weekend shopping destination led to the extension of these services from North Beach to New Brighton on Saturdays from 1 June 1963.

=== 20 Somerfield ===
Opened: 9 September 1946 (petrol bus)

The Somerfield route connected an area of housing development near Lyttelton Street to the central city and commenced service on 9 September 1946. At first buses ended their run in Rose Street but the terminus was moved on 25 November to the intersection of Barrington and Somerfield Streets. The central city terminus was located on Gloucester Street near Chancery Lane, a stop that was shared with several other routes started at around this time due to space constraints in Cathedral Square. It was not until 19 April 1952 that a stop in the Square could be allocated to the Somerfield route.

Outbound services ran non-stop to Christchurch West High School to encourage those not travelling out of the central city to use other services on account of the limited capacity of the Ford V8 buses used on this route. This measure remained in effect until the service frequency had sufficiently increased.

A cross-town service was created on 19 May 1947 involving the Somerfield and St. Martins routes. Initially only in effect on weekdays because of the limited weekend services provided to Somerfield, it was increased to a full-time arrangement from 20 February 1949.

The route was extended several times: first, to Hoon Hay Road from 22 June 1953 to avoid a clash with changes to the Spreydon route; next, to the intersection of Cashmere Road and Worsleys Road on 31 August 1962; and lastly, to Princess Margaret Hospital on 17 December 1984.

=== 21 Creyke Road ===
Opened: 9 September 1946 (diesel bus)

The Creyke Road bus service served residential areas between the Fendalton and Riccarton tram routes. Starting from Gloucester Street, buses followed much of the Riccarton tramline, turning off Riccarton Road at Straven Road and eventually terminating at the intersection of Creyke Road and Ilam Road. The first stop for outbound services and the last stop for inbound services were at Christchurch Boys' High School meaning there was no connection with the tram service.

At first the timetable provided only for a daytime weekday service that did not cater for commuters. This changed when the route was linked with the Beckenham service on 12 July 1948, adding both commuter services and a late night Friday service. The starting point of the service moved from Gloucester Street to Cathedral Square in December 1958.

Disappointing returns from the Creyke Road service prompted an instruction to drivers to pick up passengers along the Riccarton tram route, and later, the route was changed to use Deans Avenue and Kilmarnock Street where it was hoped to appeal to more potential passengers.

Maidstone Road was constructed in 1963–64 and enabled the extension of the bus route past the University of Canterbury and the Teachers College. Having exceeded Creyke Road as a destination, the route was renamed Avonhead to more accurately describe the area served. Further extensions were made as the community grew, eventually terminating on Woodbury Street at Mirfield Place and returning in a loop around Ansonby Street.

The Avonhead and Marshland Road routes were combined during 1980–81.

=== 22 Templeton ===
Opened: 18 June 1918 (battery-electric bus), Q3/Q4 1920 (petrol bus), 15 June 1953 (diesel bus)

The Board's first, and only, experiment with a battery-electric bus constituted their first service to Templeton, which commenced service on 18 June 1918. It was a feeder service that connected with the No. 8 Riccarton trams at the tram terminus in Sockburn via Islington and ran seven days a week. The vehicle, a Walker electric, was unreliable and often failed in service, leading to its replacement on the Templeton run in 1920 by a Garford petrol bus. The ride quality and amenities of the Garford were little better than the Walker it replaced, so in 1923 the body of the Walker was rebuilt on a Leyland chassis, increasing its capacity and providing a much improved ride for the passengers.

The Templeton route became a lucrative business for several private operators during the "bus wars" of the mid-1920s. They were able to provide a more appealing service for many passengers over those provided by the Board and the Railways Department with a direct connection between the central city and Templeton. With the passage of the Motor Omnibus Traffic Act in 1926, these operators were either driven out of business or purchased by the Board, upsetting many travellers who did not appreciate the mode change at Sockburn or the fact that through fares were not available.

In October 1926 the service was put out to tender. The successful bidder took over the service on 15 November 1926, but soon discovered that a significant portion of their patronage was derived from workers at the Islington freezing works which, when out of season, considerably affected the revenue they earned. The Board therefore agreed to increase the subsidy.

Weekdays through services from Templeton to Cathedral Square were trialled for a three-month period from August 1926, after which the timetable reverted to the previous feeder service. The Board reinstated them from 1 August 1930 on a select few services through to the Bridge of Remembrance as it had remained in control of the timetable.

When the contract came up for renewal in October 1928, it was re-let to the same operator. W. C. Sanders took over the service in October 1930 when the contract next came up for renewal. This was not the only business Sanders had with the Board and he quickly discovered that he was unable to meet all of his obligations. The Board cancelled all of the contracts it had with him, save for his operation of the Avonside service. Under the Board's control once again, the through services were discontinued and the feeder operation was reinstated from May 1931 using two drivers previously in the employ of Sanders. After a dispute with the union, the drivers became contracted operators of the service in April 1932, being compensated on a mileage basis. The contact was renewed in June 1933.

A variety of vehicles made an appearance on the Templeton service after the Walker and Garford buses. When the service was let to private operators, they used a Graham-Dodge and later a Republic, both hired from the Board. A Minerva was assigned to the route when through services were introduced to provide additional capacity. A Thornycroft, formerly in service to Inter City Motors, replaced the Minerva in 1937. When the Thornycroft had to be withdrawn in 1939 due to deficiencies identified by the Transport Department, a later model Minerva was assigned to the Templeton run. A Ford V8, the first in the Board's fleet, replaced it in 1942. As the Ford was equipped to display route numbers, it was the first to use the number 22, which had been assigned to Templeton.

Direct connections to Templeton were re-established on 6 October 1947 when most weekday services terminated in the central city. Most weekend services, including all those on Sundays, remained feeders to the Riccarton trams. The through-runs operated as quasi-express services between Sockburn and the city. This remained the case until the replacement of trams on the Riccarton route with diesel buses on 15 June 1953, at which point all services terminated in the central city.

Expansion of the city in the suburbs of Hornby, Islington, and Templeton in the 1950s required several modifications to the route to ensure its greatest utility to the area. For several years from April 1957 some buses ran via Blenheim Road until the Wharenui buses were extended through this area. Selected Islington services used a modified route along Waterloo and Carmen Roads from September 1957 including stops at several industrial installations for the benefit of workers in the suburbs of Sockburn and Hornby. Special services were also provided for patrons of events at the Ruapuna Speedway, and during the 1974 Commonwealth Games to Denton Park.

=== 23 Mount Pleasant ===
Opened: 27 November 1944 (petrol bus)

The genesis of the public bus service to Mount Pleasant was a bus service that the Board was already providing for workers at the Marathon Rubber Footwear factory in Woolston. From 27 November 1944 this service was extended from the factory to the Mount Pleasant school on Major Hornbrook Road. Morning and evening return services were provided, catering for factory workers travelling from the central city and mainly shoppers during the day. Inbound services followed a route along Major Hornbrook Road, St. Andrews Hill Road, Ferry Road, Dyers Road, Linwood Avenue, and Worcester Street.

Services were provided using a "square" Ford V8 that displayed the route number 3P the whole time it was assigned to the Mount Pleasant route, despite the route number 23 having been "reserved" for Mount Pleasant as far back as 1948. The AEC Mark IV Regals were the first to use route number 23.

Changes to the route included an extension to Mount Pleasant Road via Belleview Terrace from 2 June 1958. It became an extension of the Sumner service in 1982, eventually adopting the route number 3G. Following the cancellation of the Woolston service in the late 1980s, Mount Pleasant buses were rerouted to serve the area with a diversion along Rutherford Street, Garlands Road, and Radley Street.

=== 24/5S Pleasant Point/South Brighton ===
Opened: 19 January 1925 (petrol bus), 18 October 1952 (diesel bus)

Public agitation around 1919 for improved transport links to South Brighton prompted the Board to investigate its options for the area. A tramline, as an extension of the Brighton service, was considered but rejected, as was the idea of using the Walker battery-electric bus that had recently been removed from the Templeton run.

The Board did undertake a one-month trial in 1923 using a Garford bus and local driver, but it made a loss and was not renewed. It was another two years before they tried again, and on 19 January 1925 a contracted feeder service connecting with the Brighton trams commenced operation using a local driver, Ern Smith. He used his own vehicle, a converted International truck, for which he was compensated on a mileage basis.

The service remained a contracted operation for the next 2½ decades. Arch Lawson took over in December 1932 and, with a Willys-Knight vehicle, ran the service for the next four years. Jim McGregor successfully tendered for the service in February 1936 and used his own Packard except when demand necessitated the use of a larger vehicle on loan from the Board. By 1939 overcrowding had become a problem so the Board increased the number of services and constructed a new bus on a Ford V8 chassis with a capacity for 16 seats. It was delivered to McGregor on 11 August 1939 and he paid for it over time by not receiving a subsidy for operation of the service.

Wartime restrictions on petrol resulted in the removal of all Sunday services from the timetable from March 1942. They were not reinstated until November 1943.

Overloading had again become a problem by 1943 resulting in the increased use of a larger vehicle to handle the demand. McGregor had his contract extended in October 1944, giving him the certainty he needed to obtain a larger vehicle. His Ford V8 was stretched, enabling it to carry 25 passengers, and was ready in September 1945. The Board occasionally borrowed this vehicle to trial new services, and in these cases McGregor had use of one of the Board's "Square" Ford V8 buses, as he had done while his own Ford was being modified.

Following concerns raised about the dearth of Sunday and evening services by the South Brighton Progress League in August 1946, the Board increased the subsidy it paid for operation of the service. Despite this, Sunday services continued to run to a summer timetable, and evening services were withdrawn after failing to attract sufficient interest. Evening services did make an appearance again in July 1949, though not as a Pleasant Point service, but instead as an extension of one of the late Wainoni services on Fridays and Saturdays.

McGregor retired in January 1950, leaving the operation to his business partner, Wilf Read. On 18 June 1951 the Board assumed control of the service, having terminated the contract with Read. As the vehicle that had been used on this service belonged to the private operator, the Board decided to use a 29-seat Ford V8 from its own fleet on the route.

Through services were introduced on 26 November 1951 at the behest of the Progress League, comprising morning and evening commuter services and a select few daytime services for shoppers. The Fords soon had to be replaced by Leyland Tiger buses to cope with the demand, though the Fords continued to provide the feeder services.

The withdrawal of trams from the Brighton tramline and the introduction of diesel buses to the route saw Pleasant Point services combined with those to Brighton in a new timetable, effective from 18 October 1952. As connections with trams were no longer required, the new timetable also eliminated the feeder services.

Several route modifications followed to extend services to areas of new development including to the intersection of Caspian Street and Rockinghorse Road from 3 October 1960, and eventually, to the end of Rockinghorse Road. When the terminus moved beyond the Pleasant Point Domain, the route number 5S and destination South Brighton were assigned to the route. The previous route number, 24, appears to have been allocated after 1945, the route prior to this time being identified only by its destination, Pleasant Point. The route was re-designated Southshore in 1984.

=== 24 Airport ===
Opened: 5 January 1976 (diesel bus)

Canterbury's centennial celebrations in 1950 were the first occasion on which the Board was called upon to provide services to the Airport. Demand for travel to the official function on 18 December 1950 at which the former Harewood Airport became Christchurch International Airport exceeded the capacity of the regular airport service provided by Midland Motorways so the Board was asked to assist for the occasion.

The Board's own regular service to the airport began on 5 January 1976 following the Board's acquisition of the licence for the route after Midland Motorways discontinued its own airport service. It quickly became one of the more profitable routes for the Board, justifying an increase in service frequency to 30-minute intervals after only two years.

Besides local residents along the route and airport workers, air passengers were one of the biggest sources of patronage for the service. The large amount of luggage they normally had with them necessitated the use of specially adapted buses with space for luggage racks and bays. When "New" Reliance buses proved inadequate to the task, they were replaced on this route with three AEC Swifts and a Leyland with more generous accommodation for luggage. The University of Canterbury also became an important source of passengers as the route included Riccarton and Ilam Roads.

=== 25 Wharenui ===
Opened: 31 December 1946 (diesel bus)

New housing estates in Riccarton between Blenheim and Riccarton Roads prompted the creation of the Wharenui route, which commenced service on 30 December 1946. Buses also provided access to the industrial area off Blenheim Road and to the Addington Railway Workshops. A small change was made in 1947 to provide better access to an area of new State housing off Wharenui Road.

Initially, Wharenui was a standalone route that started from Gloucester Street until such time as it could be accommodated in Cathedral Square. From October 1955 it was linked with the Wainoni route and then from 4 September 1967 with the Burwood route.

Though Riccarton Road was part of the route, the first stop for outbound services and the last stop for inbound services were in Picton Avenue meaning there was no connection with the Riccarton tramline. This issue became moot on 1 August 1960 when a route alteration diverted Wharenui buses down Deans Avenue and Blenheim Road before rejoining the old route. There were many changes to the route over the next three decades including extensions that took it well beyond Wharenui. New destinations included Curletts Road and Springs Road and after the route ended up connecting with Hornby Mall in the 1980s it was combined with existing Templeton, Lincoln, and Southbridge routes.

=== 26 Huntsbury ===
Opened: 13 May 1946 (diesel bus)

Services to Huntsbury commenced on 13 May 1946 departing from Cathedral Square and terminating in Huntsbury Avenue. The hill section of the route included two sharp turns that the Ford V8 buses used on the route had difficulty in negotiating.

Light loadings on this route only justified the provision of three commuter and a few casual traveller return services per weekday. An evening service was not added to the timetable until April 1949, and another five years before a Friday night service for shoppers was included.

Numerous route changes were made as alterations to the nearby St. Martins and Beckenham routes necessitated modifications to ensure the best coverage for residents in the area. In the year from August 1957 eight trips were added to the timetable but all were eliminated in September 1958.

Similarity between the Huntsbury and St. Martins routes led to the Huntsbury route becoming part of the St. Martins service on 17 December 1984. Two new route numbers were created: route 12E terminating on Centaurus Road at Vernon Terrace, and route 12F which was an extension of the 12E route by running back down Centaurus Road to Ramahana Road to join the old Huntsbury route.

=== 27 Beckenham ===
Opened: 12 July 1948 (diesel bus)

The Beckenham service from Cathedral Square to its terminus at the south end of Birdwood Avenue commenced on 12 July 1948 as a weekday-only service to cater for those not served by either the Cashmere or St. Martins routes. It was linked with the Creyke Road route.

Route alterations included a switch from Carlyle Street to Byron Street after the Waltham Road railway over bridge was built; a change in the route used by off-peak services on 16 September 1957 to follow part of the St. Martins route before rejoining the Beckenham route at Norwood Street; and a change on 26 September 1958 to the start of the route to make it run through Sydenham.

Residential development in the Bowenvale Valley from the mid-1970s resulted in an extension to the Beckenham route over the bridge at the bottom of Bowenvale Avenue and including Landsdowne Terrace and Wedgewood Avenue. Weight restrictions on the bridge meant that only the Board's "Short" Reliance buses could be used and three were retained for this purpose after others in the class had been disposed of. Following the withdrawal of the remaining "Short" Reliance buses in 1981, permission was obtained to use "New" Reliance vehicles with seated passengers only. Strengthening work carried out on the bridge in 1986 enabled the restrictions to be rescinded.

When the link with the Creyke Road service was removed, the Beckenham route was linked for a short time with an Avonside service before being combined with the Bromley service in the 1980s.

=== 28 Lyttelton ===
Opened: 28 February 1964 (diesel bus)

Prior to its regular Lyttelton services, the Board ran tourist services over the Port Hills via Sumner. In 1950, it also provided special services to transport people to Lyttelton for the Canterbury Centennial celebrations that included a re-enactment of the arrival of the first settlers. Buses were required to augment the capacity of the trains that were also used to bring revellers to the festivities.

The Lyttelton road tunnel was opened on 27 February 1964 and the Board's buses were used to convey visitors to the official ceremony. Timetabled services began the following day.

The more direct route of the bus service from Cathedral Square along High Street and Ferry Road proved too popular for the Railways Department's Lyttelton passenger service to compete, leading to the cancellation of these trains in 1972. This enabled the Board to have its licence for the Lyttelton route changed to follow a path more closely aligned to the rail line and to serve areas near the railway stations. The similarity of the new Lyttelton route to the existing Opawa route was such that the two routes were eventually combined.

In Lyttelton, buses were always run around the block of Dublin, London, and Oxford Streets to Norwich Quay to avoid the need to reverse buses on Lyttelton's steep streets. Some buses connected with the Diamond Harbour ferry at the jetty.

Tolls were payable by all vehicles using the road tunnel, including the Board's buses, and this cost was passed on to passengers. Drivers handed over pre-paid tickets at the tollbooth to use the tunnel and passengers were issued with a separate ticket on purchase of a fare for a Lyttelton bus to cover the toll. This extra charge had been incorporated into the regular fares by June 1965 and the toll tickets were thereafter only used with special tickets.

After the commencement of the Board's Airport service in 1976, the Lyttelton and Airport routes were linked to form a combined service. The Board acquired the Governors Bay service from Railways Road Services in November 1982. In keeping with the existing Lyttelton service, it became a commuter service with a once-a-week extra service for casual travellers.

=== 29 Parklands ===
The Parklands service was created to cater for travellers to Christchurch's northeastern suburbs following a redesign of the bus route network in 1984. It replaced services that previously terminated in, or passed through, Wainoni.

=== 30 & 31 Seaside Specials ===
Opened: 22 December 1984 (diesel bus)

New Brighton used to attract people from across the city on Saturdays to take advantage of the fact that it was the only place in Christchurch where shops traded in the weekend. To cater for the demand, two services were run on Saturdays in addition to the regular Brighton service: route 30, bringing in people from the suburbs of Bishopdale, Papanui, St. Albans, Mairehau, Shirley, Burwood, and North Beach, and route 31, for people from Spreydon, Sydenham, St. Martins, Linwood, Wainoni, and Bexley.

As weekend trading was extended, and later included Sunday trading, Brighton lost its appeal as a shopping destination and the services were discontinued.

== Vehicles ==
=== Trams ===
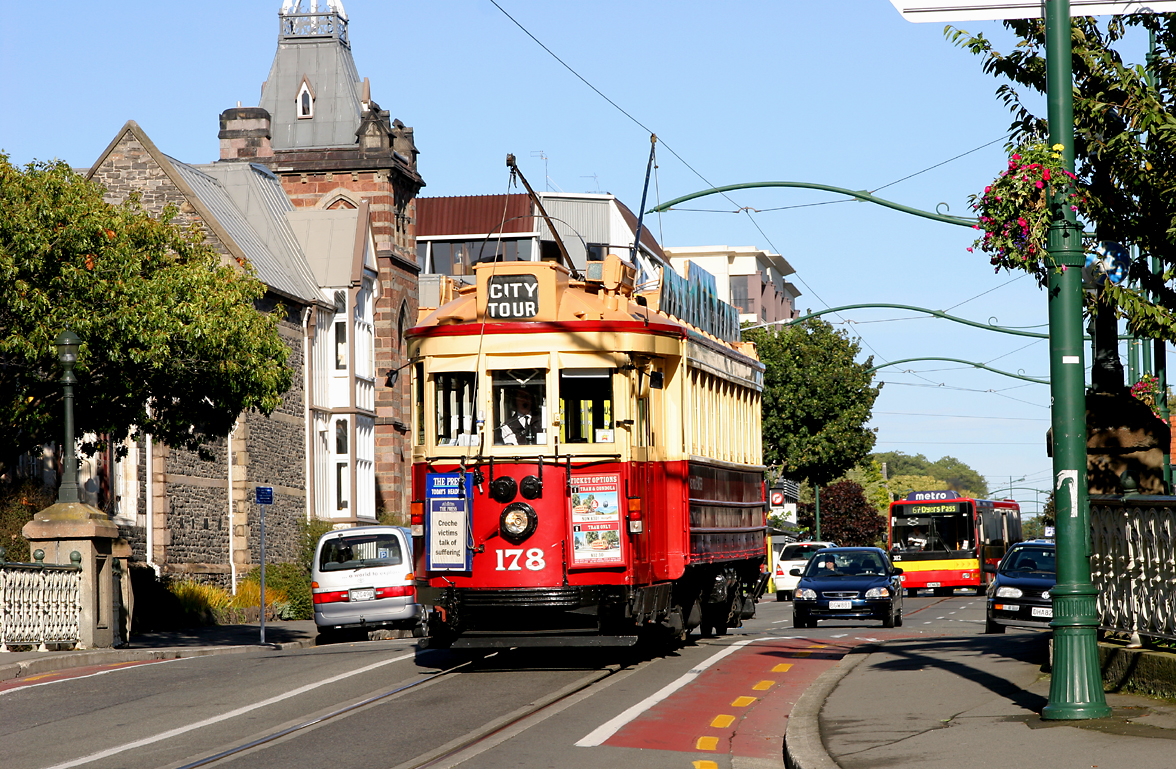
Brill tram no. 178 on the inner-city tram circuit

The rolling stock available to the Board at the commencement of its services in June 1905 consisted of both electric trams it had commissioned and vehicles acquired from the private tramway companies that had previously served Christchurch. In keeping with its desire to modernise the tramway, the Board had taken delivery of 27 electric tramcars constructed by John Stephenson and Company, New York (22) and Boon and Company, Christchurch (5). Also added to the fleet were 7 Kitson steam trams and 42 trailers from the Christchurch Tramway Company, and 22 trailers from both the New Brighton Tramway Company and the City and Suburban Tramway Company when the sale of the assets of these companies to the Board was finalised.

Horse trams, a legacy of the old private tramway companies, were phased out as soon as they could be replaced by steam or electric traction. The steam trams continued in service for many decades, initially to continue services while installation of electrical infrastructure was still underway, but eventually relegated to non-revenue operations and providing additional capacity at times of heavy loadings.

The trams supplied by John Stephenson and Company were the first and last trams to be imported by the Board. Thereafter all trams and trailers were manufactured in Christchurch, two of which were made by the Board itself and the remainder supplied by Boon and Company. Over the life of the tramway, Boon constructed 69 electric trams and 44 trailers for use in Christchurch including custom models such as the "Hills" cars for use on the Cashmere line.

=== Buses ===
The manner in which buses were added to the Board's fleet in its early years typically involved the purchase of a chassis and running gear from a supplier, agent, or manufacturer followed by assembly and construction of a body either in its own workshops or at a local firm. Several were also acquired in operational condition from private operators following the "bus wars" of the mid-1920s.

By the 1930s, the Board had become dissatisfied with petrol buses and, after investigating a new "trackless tram" technology from Britain, decided to use trolley buses to replace trams on the North Beach tramline. English Electric won the contract to supply the buses for the first route, but after evaluating a Ransomes trolley bus, the Board decided to go with Ransomes when purchasing trolley buses for the second route. They proved to be popular with the public and resulted in operational cost savings over the trams, giving the Board little desire to ever rely on petrol buses again.

Diesel technology had matured to a point where, in the mid-1930s, the Board was able to purchase diesel buses to replace trams on several of its least lucrative tramlines. Though plans were made to introduce them on other routes, the arrival of World War 2 made them difficult to obtain. Still needing to increase capacity and retire older vehicles in the fleet, the Board had to turn back to petrol buses and reluctantly ended up with one of the largest fleets of Ford V8 buses in the country.

After the war, the Board wasted little time in modernising its fleet with diesel buses as they became available. They were used to replace all remaining tram services by years end 1954, and replace the trolley buses in 1956, as well as enabling the creation of new routes. The fleet became all-diesel in the 1960s and thereafter underwent occasional fleet upgrades, culminating in the Board's last purchase of M.A.N. buses in the mid-1980s.

Manufacturer	Model	Quantity	Propulsion type	Fleet number(s)	Capacity	Price	Entered service	Withdrawn	Notes
Walker		1	Battery-electric		21	£2,255	3 June 1918	1 January 1922	See below.
Garford		1	Petrol		28	£1,586/14/1	June 1920	1923	See below.
Leyland		1	Petrol		29	£1,682/9/2	1923		Created using the extended body of the "Beetle" bus on a Leyland truck chassis. Dismantled in 1927: body sold; chassis formed part of new tip-truck for the Permanent Way Department.
Leyland		2	Petrol		26	£1,275 (each)			See below.
Leyland	Tigress	1	Petrol	220	29	£1,833/7/9	1928 (commissioned)		See below.
White		1	Petrol		23	£2,300	January 1925 (purchased)		Modified by Boon and Company before entering service.
Clydesdale		1	Petrol		22	£1,750	January 1925 (purchased)		Modified by Boon and Company before entering service, also new engine fitted by supplier. Sold in 1932 to the Waimakariri River Trust.
Tilling-Stevens		2	Petrol-electric		25	£3,985/15/8 (both)	1925	May 1926	See below.
Republic	81	4	Petrol		23				See below.
Republic		1	Petrol		15	£180			Purchased from private operator L. J. Howard under the "Motor Omnibus Traffic Act". Converted into a truck for stores use. Body sold in 1928 and replaced (as a truck) in 1939.
Graham-Dodge		2	Petrol		20	£622 (each)			Acquired from private operator G. B. Lowis under the "Motor Omnibus Traffic Act". Dismantled in 1934: body sold; chassis repurposed.
AEC		2	Petrol		23, 30	£800 (23 seat), £1,043 (30 seat)			See below.
Minerva		2	Petrol	218–219	29 (218), 30 (219)		1928 (218), 24 December 1931 (219)		See below.
Reo	1927	2	Petrol	221–222	25		September 1935 (purchased)		Acquired from Inter City Motors when the Board bought out the company. They were being used on the North Beach route and continued to do so in service to the Board. Used for driver training from 2 November 1936. Both withdrawn in 1937 due to damage: one was sold, while the other was taken out of service because of its poor condition.
Thornycroft	1930	1	Petrol	223	27		September 1935 (purchased)		Acquired from Inter City Motors when the Board bought out the company. Initially used for relief duties, it was later assigned to the Templeton feeder run from 1937 to 1939. Sold in 1942 to Victory Motors, Blenheim.
Thornycroft	Lightning	1	Petrol	224	30		October 1935		Commissioned by Inter City Motors but delivered to the Board after it bought out the company. Leased to the Avonside contractor from 1937 to 1942. Sold in May 1943 to Nelson Suburban Bus Lines.
English Electric		6	Trolley	207–212	40			8 November 1956	See below.
Ransomes		5	Trolley	213–217				8 November 1956	See below.
AEC	Q	6	Diesel	225–228, 235–236	39	£2,997 (225–228), £3,237 (235–236)	2 November 1936 (225–228), 1 May 1938 (235–236)		See below.
AEC	Regal	12	Diesel	229–234, 237–242	33	£2,549 (229–234), £2,793 (237–242)	2 November 1936 (229–234), 1940 (237–242)		See below.
Ford	"Square"	7	Petrol	243–244, 245–246, 247–249	29	£2,447 (243–244), £2,551 (245–246), £2,434 (247–249)	1942–1943 (243–246), 1943–1945 (247–249)		See below.
Ford	"Cream"	20	Petrol	250–269	31	£1,545	1946		See below.
Ford		1	Petrol	270	25	£2,449	1945–1946	c. March 1955	See below.
Ford	"Red"	13	Petrol	271–283			1947–1950		See below.
Leyland	Tiger	6	Diesel	284–289	37		1950 (purchased)	c. 31 March 1964	See below.
AEC	Regal IV	95	Diesel	290–384		~£7,000	1952, 1954	c. 31 March 1981	See below.
AEC	short Reliance	37	Diesel	385–421	37		1956–1957	1975–1981	See below.
AEC	long Reliance	10	Diesel	422–431	42		1958	1982	See below.
AEC	new Reliance	24	Diesel	432–455	42		1963–1964	1990	See below.
AEC	Swift	3	Diesel	456–458	43		1973, 1977	1989	See below.
Bristol	RELL6L	54	Diesel	457–481 (later 459–483), 484–512			1974–1975 (457–481), 1977–1978 (484–512)	1990	See below.
Bristol	Hess	96	Diesel	513–608			1978–1981		See below.
Leyland	Lion B21	1	Diesel	609	35 (seated), 34 (standing)		c. 1978		See below.
Leyland	Cub	2	Diesel	610–611	25 (seated), 12 (standing)	$90,000 (each)	1984		See below.
MAN	SL202 "City Bus"	69	Diesel	612–680	45 (612–649), 43 (650–669), 49 (670), 34 (671), 53 (672–680)		1986–1990		See below.

==== AEC ====
AEC buses first joined the Board's fleet as a result of the "bus wars" of the mid-1920s when they purchased two AEC petrol-powered buses from private operators Dixon and Munnerley. The first of these buses was sold in 1931 to the Waimakariri River Trust. The second bus, after being dismantled, was sold in 1935 with both the body and chassis going to separate new owners.

When it came time to consider further tramline closures in the mid-1930s, the Board decided to go with AEC diesel buses as they felt the technology had matured to the point where they were a reliable option. Though the trolley buses introduced only a few years earlier had performed well and found favour with passengers, their dependence on fixed infrastructure did not suit the Board's preference for operational flexibility. The first order for ten chassis was placed with AEC in 1935–1936.

Once the Regal Mark IVs had been used to retire the last of the trams, the Board sought to acquire additional diesel buses to replace its first generation diesel buses from the 1930s, the trolley bus fleet, and the Ford V8s. They settled on the AEC Reliance, of which three different models were purchased: the "short", "long", and "new" Reliances.

===== AEC Q =====
The Board's fleet of AEC Qs was delivered in two stages. The first batch were assembled in the Board's workshops from four chassis of the initial order with AEC and finished with wooden framing and aluminium panelling. They commenced their duties as nos. 225–228 on 2 November 1936, followed two years later by the second batch of two Qs, numbered 235–236, on 1 May 1938.

These diesel buses were the first to feature a new livery consisting of cream with a red band around the bottom half and Tramway Board decals on the side. This was a departure from the Board's traditional use of white and green on its trams.

Nos. 225 and 226 were sold in 1960 to Transport Units and Trailers. The other four Qs were still on the Board's fleet register in March 1963. The Tramway Historical Society acquired the remains of Qs nos. 225, 227, and 228 and plans to restore no. 228 to working order.

===== Regal =====
The other six chassis from the initial order placed with AEC were for Regal-class buses, which, as with the Qs, were also assembled in the Board's workshops with wooden framing and aluminium panelling. The design of the Regals was in the half-cab style, in which the driver was isolated from the passengers in a small compartment to the right of the centrally mounted engine at the front of the vehicle. This first batch of Regals commenced their duties on 2 November 1936 as numbers 229–234.

A second batch of six Regals was ordered in 1940 and entered service as numbers 237–242. Satisfied with the performance of the diesels now in its fleet, the Board attempted to order an additional 13 Regal chassis with which it intended to construct buses for the replacement of tram services to Fendalton and Opawa. The order was never completed, as the vehicles could not be supplied after the commencement of World War II.

As with the Qs, the Regals started out life in the new cream and red livery, though some were later repainted in the revised livery of red with the new logo on the sides.

Collins Brothers of Kurow purchased nos. 238, 240, and 242 between 1958 and 1960 for use as staff transport on public works projects. Numbers 229 and 232 also became staff transport, for contractors Wilkins and Davies, and Otago Motors purchased no. 233. Five of the Regals were still in the Board's possession as at March 1963. The Tramway Historical Society later acquired both 233 and 240, and intends to restore no. 240 to working order.

===== AEC Regal IV =====
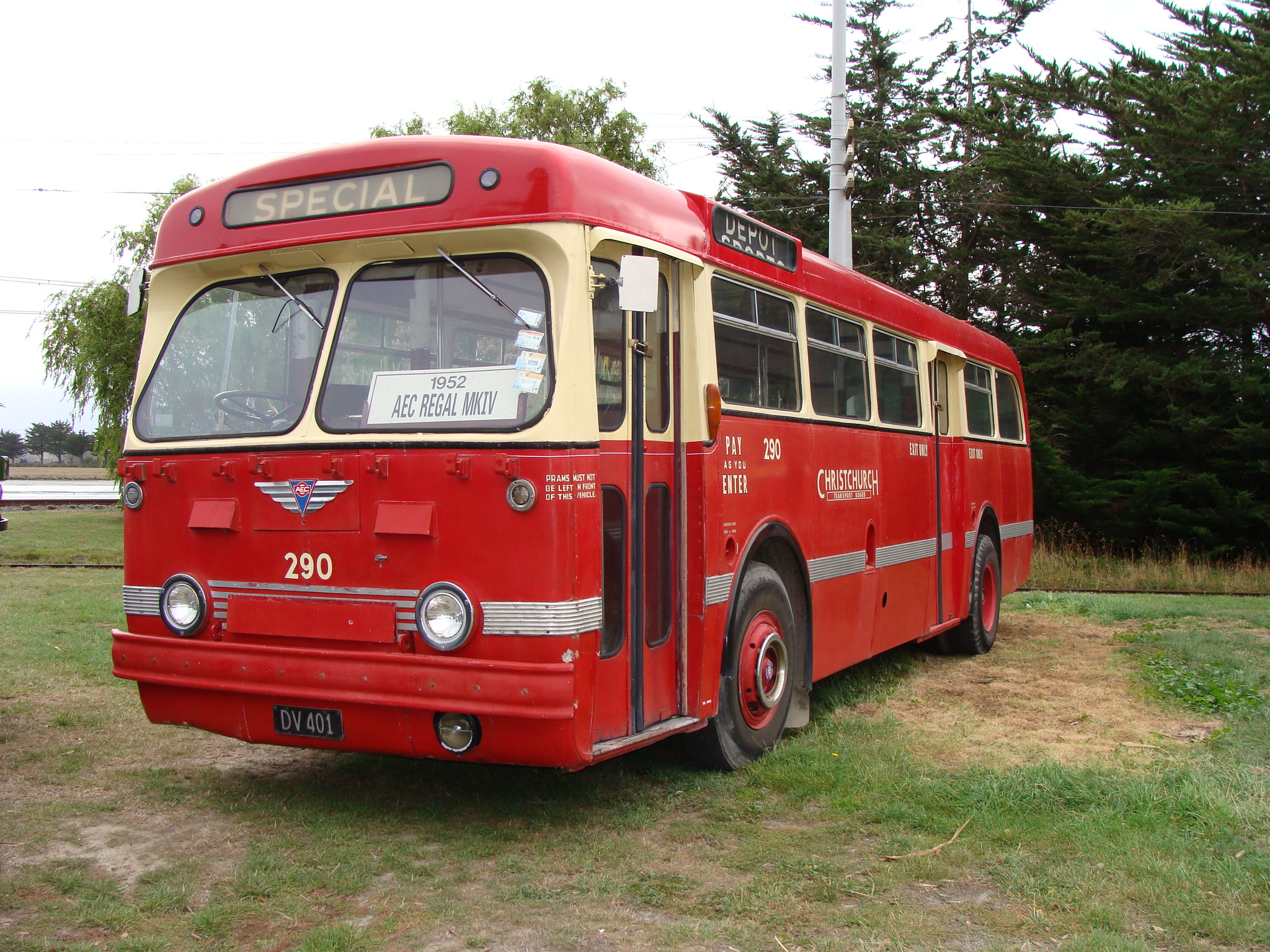
AEC Regal IV no. 290

In what was to become the biggest addition to the Board's fleet thus far, they decided in the early 1950s to order AEC Regal IV buses. The first batch of 72 vehicles arrived in 1952, having been manufactured by Crossley (numbers 290–328) and Park Royal (numbers 329–361). Another 23 buses arrived in 1954, also from Park Royal, and entered service as numbers 362–384. Concerns were raised about the buses being assembled in England rather than supporting local manufacturers, but the Board considered its decision justified in light of its need for vehicles to replace trams that were being withdrawn from service at about the same time.

All Regal IVs were delivered in a new livery, consisting of red with cream around the windows. As the Board's name had changed in 1951 to the Christchurch Transport Board, the old Tramway Board crest was dropped and in its place the buses featured a new Transport Board logo on their sides.

After serving the Board for a quarter of a century, the buses were withdrawn from the 1970s, starting with no. 343 that was scrapped after being involved in an accident on 2 September 1974, and later, nos. 305 and 367, which were sold in March 1975. From October 1978 the remaining Regal IVs were disposed of, with the final 12 in the Board's possession last being listed in the fleet register on 31 March 1981. A special last service for the Regal IVs was run on 29 July 1981 using class leader no. 290.

As second hand vehicles, the Regal IVs found little favour with other operators, only ten of which ended up with new transport service providers. New private owners repurposed a few, but most were scrapped. No. 290 was loaned to the Tramway Historical Society from 1978, an arrangement that was made permanent when it was given to the society in 1989.

===== short Reliance =====
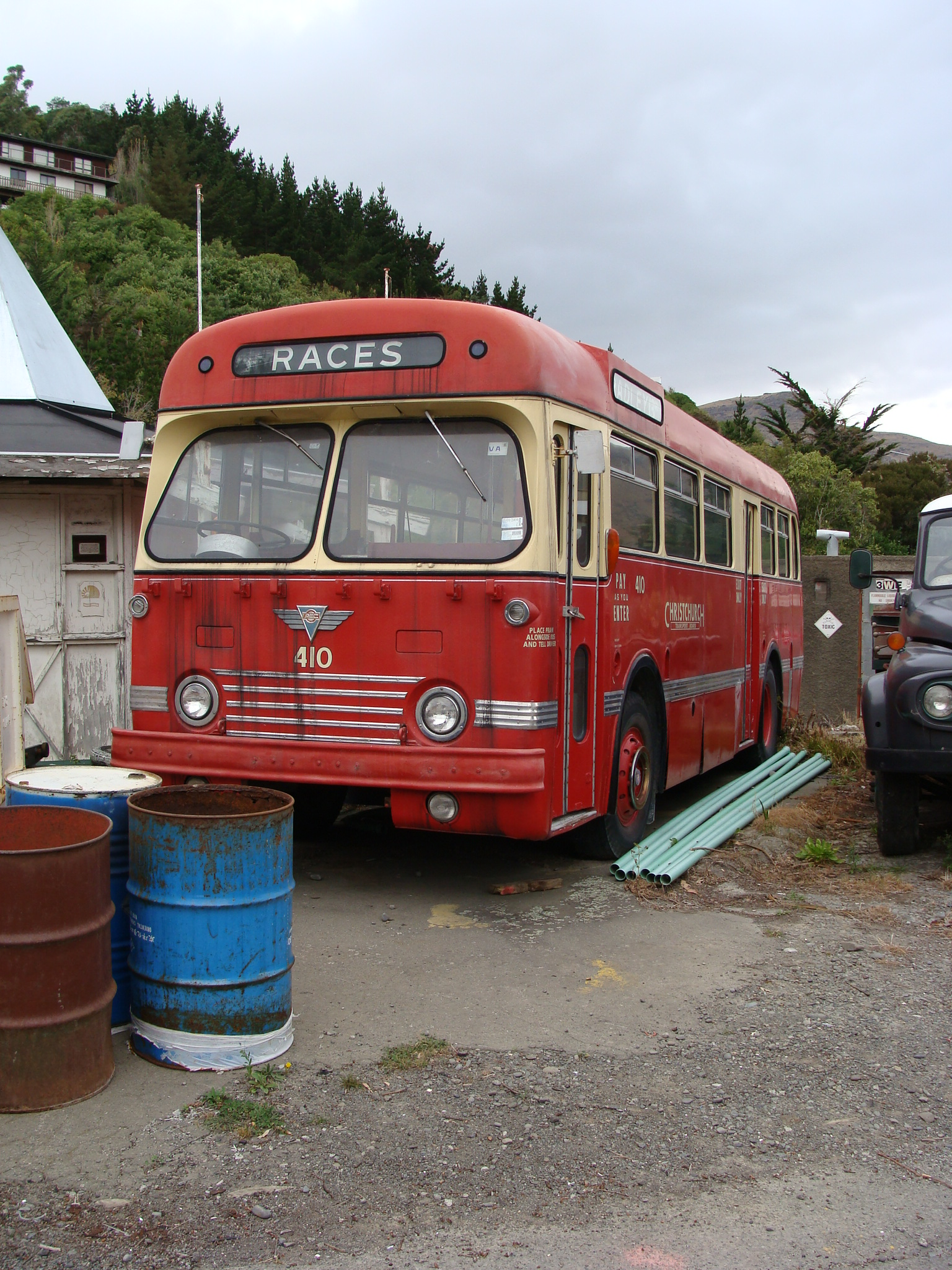
AEC "short" Reliance no. 410

The first batch of 17 "short" Reliances were assembled by Park Royal, England and introduced as nos. 385–401 in 1956–1957 to replace trolley buses on both of the electrified routes. A second batch of 20 "short" Reliances was delivered in 1958 as part of an order for 30 vehicles from Park Royal. They entered service as nos. 402–421.

Most of the "short" Reliances were sold on to other operators around the country when retired by the Board between 1975 and 1981. Nos. 385–386, 388–389, 393, 397, and 399 went to Nelson Suburban Bus Lines; nos. 403–405, 407–409, and 412 went to Ritchies Transport; and nos. 390, 392, 395, 398, and 401 went to Waitaki Transport. There were several other sales in small lots to other smaller operators.

The last "short" Reliances in service to the Board were nos. 415, 417, and 418, which were used on the City Clipper service from 1975 to June 1981, when the service was withdrawn. These buses were then sold to Newmans Coach Lines for use as staff transport at Marsden Point.

Number 410 ended up with Wyldes Motors, Runanga who, in 1991, gave it to the Tramway Historical Society in working order.

===== long Reliance =====
Ten "long" Reliance buses were delivered in 1958 as part of a 30-vehicle order that also included 20 "short" Reliances. They entered service as nos. 422–431.

They primarily served on the Dallington and Bryndwr routes as it was found that their lighter steering was advantageous on the narrow roads and corners typical of these routes. The arrival of these buses gave the Board the capacity it needed to be able to dispose of the last of the petrol buses in its fleet, making the whole fleet diesel only.

When retired, no. 426 was sold to Timaru City Council and no. 430 to Southey, Northland. The last of these buses was gone by 1982.

===== new Reliance =====
In 1963 the Board decided to acquire more Reliance buses, for which it purchased 24 of the same ten-metre chassis used in the earlier "long" Reliance fleet. New Zealand Motor Bodies was commissioned to assemble the vehicles, which commenced their duties as nos. 432–455 from September 1963. They became known as the "new" Reliances, the last of which was delivered in 1964.

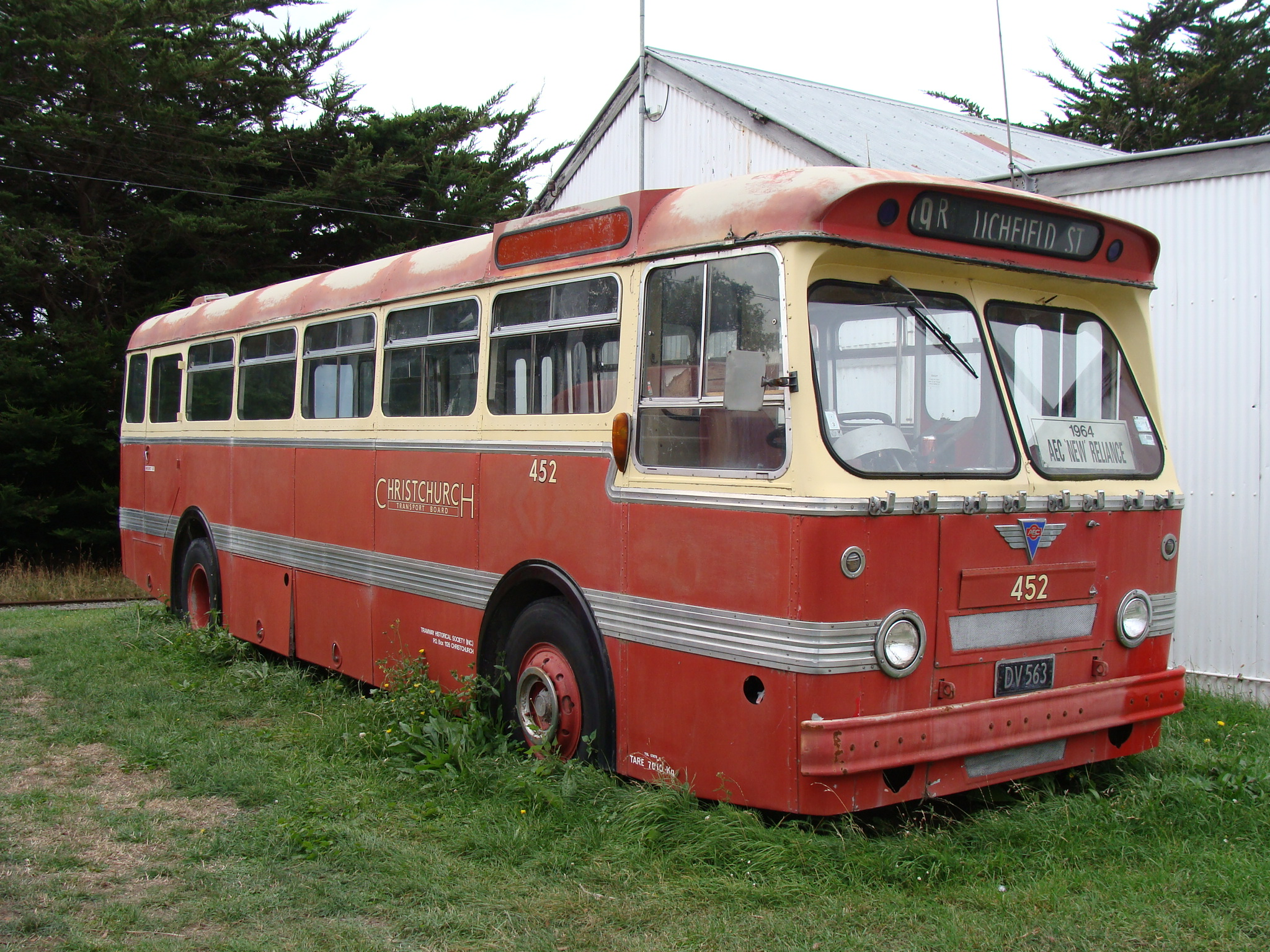
AEC Reliance no. 452

Initially, they were assigned to the Fendalton/Opawa route. In 1966, they were moved on to the Papanui/Cashmere route, as originally intended, as their lighter construction made them more appropriate for the hill section than the Mark IVs they replaced.

Twenty-two of the "new" Reliance fleet received new motors as they were overhauled after the Board took delivery of 25 new engines in 1979. The original motors had proved to be unreliable, experiencing a high rate of failure in the head gasket.

Unlike the other Reliances, the "new" Reliances ended their days with the Board in the new red-and-white livery, which first made an appearance on the Bristol "Hess" buses, rather than the original in-service all-red livery.

Ten of the "new" Reliances were sold to Charlie Dobson for use on a school contract. Eleven of the fleet were still in service at the time of deregulation in 1989, and were sold the following year to a private operator. Also in 1989, the Board gave no. 452 in working order to the Tramway Historical Society.

===== Swift =====
New Zealand Motor Bodies assembled the first AEC Swift, no. 456, for the agents to use as a demonstration. It was purchased by the Board and entered service in 1973. Board general manager Fardell had hoped to purchase additional Swifts but was unable to obtain approval to do so. The local agent, in anticipation of further business with the Board, had imported a further two chassis, but these ended up in storage when not purchased. When the Board finally purchased them in 1977, they were assembled by Hawke Brothers and commenced their duties as nos. 457 and 458, with the same internal configuration as no. 456.

In service, they were beset by a litany of problems that made them unpopular with both the Board and its drivers. The engine and transmission in no. 456 had to be replaced, and there was an ongoing problem with the fuel supply that made them unsuitable for use on the hills. Also, the rear-engine nature of this vehicle caused problems with weight distribution, which was resolved by changing the seating configuration to 35 seated, 34 standing.

After the latter two buses were added to the fleet they were mostly used on the Airport route. Though they offered good ride quality, the limited seating provision made them unpopular with passengers at peak times.

The increasing unreliability of the engines led to the withdrawal of the Swifts, the last of which, no. 458, was retired from the Bromley, North Beach, and Bowenvale routes in 1989. No. 456 eventually ended up in Edgecumbe with a private owner, while no. 458 was converted for use as a pie cart in Latimer Square before being transferred to the West Coast.

==== Bristol ====
===== RELL6L =====
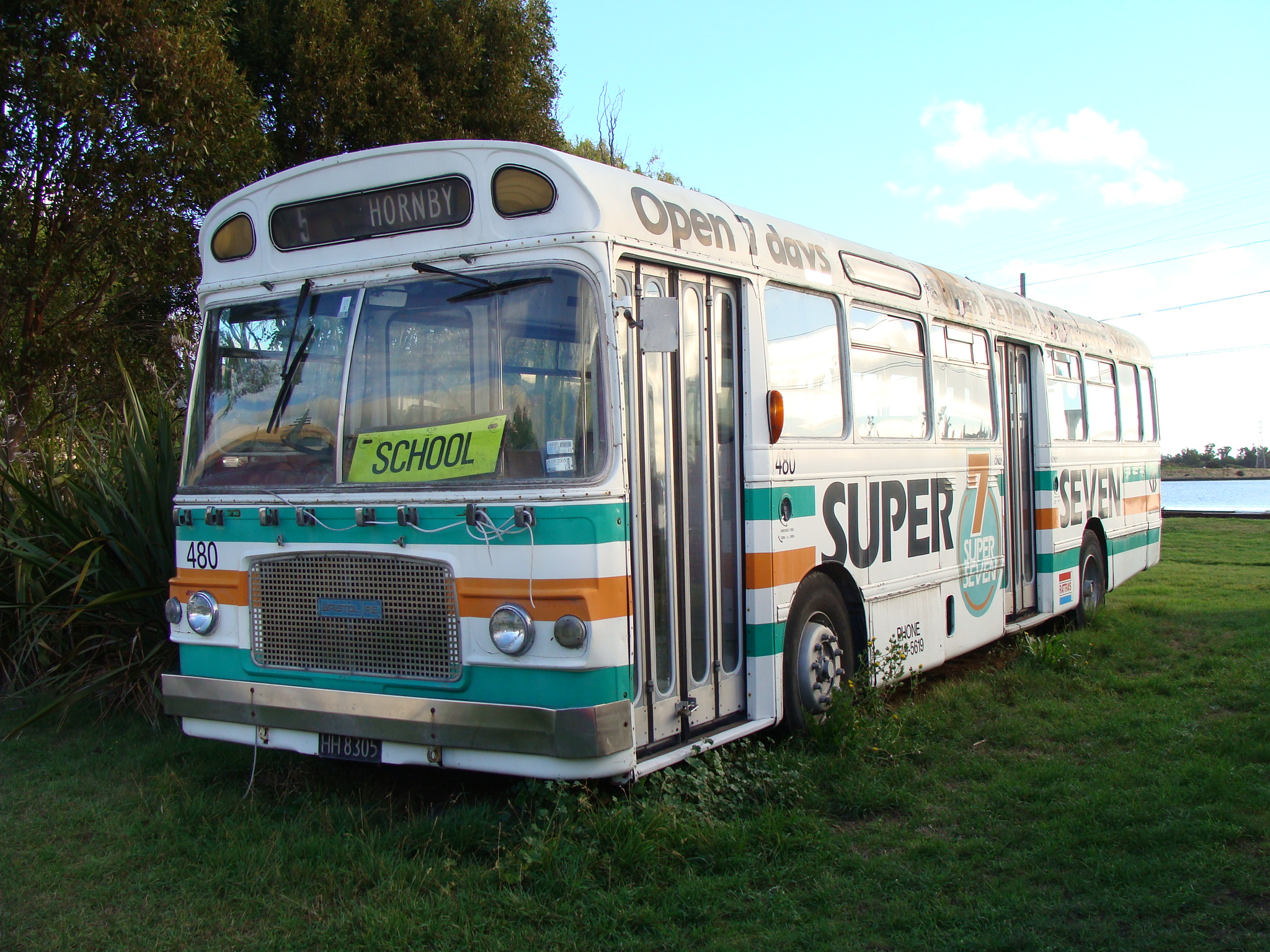
Bristol RE no. 480

Bristols were the first new buses to be added to the Board's fleet as part of its fleet upgrade programme commenced in the mid-1970s. They had hoped to purchase the RELL6G with the Gardner engine, but when informed that they were not available, opted to go with the RELL6L (Rear Engine, Long, Low, 6 cylinder, Leyland 510 engine) instead.

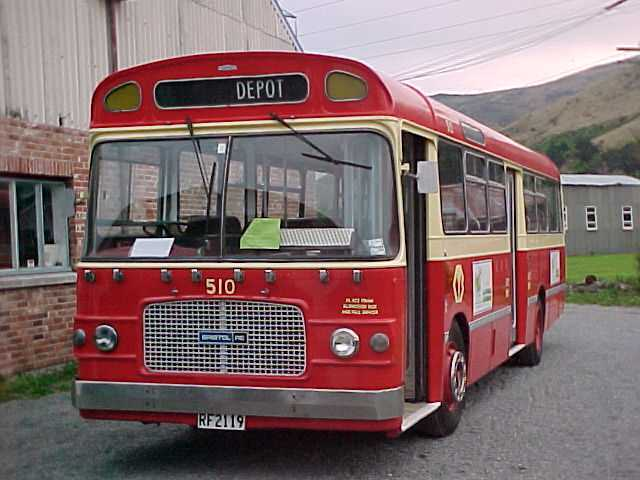
Bristol RE no. 510

The first batch of 25 vehicles came with kitset bodies designed by Eastern Coachworks, England, and were assembled by Hawke Brothers, Auckland. Originally numbered 457–481, nos. 457–458 later became 475–476 when the former numbers were allocated to two of the Swifts, leaving the Bristols numbered 459–483. They commenced their duties between 1974 and 1975.

After experiencing problems with the English motor bodies, the Board decided to purchase only the chassis when ordering the next batch of 29 vehicles. Once landed in New Zealand, the bodies were constructed and fitted to the chassis by Hawke Brothers, giving them the same outward appearance as the earlier ECW-designed buses. Numbered 484–512, these vehicles commenced their duties between 1977 and 1978.

The new CTB logo first made an appearance on the Bristol buses, which were also the last of the fleet to feature the all-red livery first seen on the Mark IVs. A select few buses from the second batch had fold-down seats to provide additional space for luggage on the Airport service.

These buses remained in service to the Board until deregulation, after which they were "retired" by the Christchurch City Council in an attempt to hinder the operations of companies competing with its Christchurch Transport Limited, the successor to the Board. When this failed, the council was eventually able to dispose of the buses to other operators around the country. Two of these vehicles were given to the Tramway Historical Society in working order: no. 480 (Mark I), and no. 510 (Mark II) in 1990. A second RELL Mk II, No. 505, was donated to the Society by Good Times Tours in 2013 as a source of spare parts.

===== Hess =====
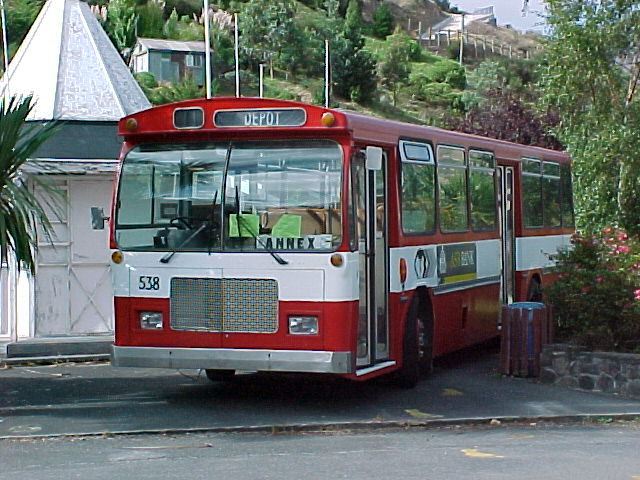
Bristol RE "Hess" no. 538

The next round of bus acquisitions for the fleet modernisation programme consisted of Bristol RELL6L chassis and motor bodies licensed from Carrosserie Hess of Switzerland. Once arrived in New Zealand, all of the chassis were assembled in Nelson. Next, they were fitted with small fibreglass cabs and driven by Transport Board staff to New Zealand Motor Bodies factories in Christchurch, and later Palmerston North, where the bodies were constructed. Nos. 513–578 were assembled in Christchurch up to 1980 when that factory closed, after which nos. 580–599 were assembled in Palmerston North. No. 579 was framed in Christchurch and finished in Palmerston North. The remainder of the "Hess" buses, nos. 600–608, were also assembled in Christchurch before the factory closed, but received a different fitout from the other buses for their duties on charter work.

The Board's last livery change, red with a white, central horizontal stripe, first made an appearance on the "Hess" buses. This livery was also applied to some other buses when they received major overhauls. These buses also featured triple-digit route number displays beside the destination sign at the front, as well as a destination sign at the side next to the front door.

As with the earlier batches of Bristols, the Board had been keen to avoid the Leyland engine, so after a favourable evaluation from a 1987–1988 trial, all of the buses assembled in Palmerston North were refitted with MAN engines.

After deregulation drastically cut the number of routes Christchurch Transport was responsible for, the "Hess" buses were relegated to providing additional capacity at peak times, as the MAN buses were sufficient for regular duties. When these buses were no longer required, the council was eventually able to sell them to other operators around the country. They gave no. 538 in working order to the Tramway Historical Society in 1990.

==== Ford V8 ====
After successfully introducing diesel buses to its operation in the mid-1930s, the Board had hoped to phase out its older petrol-powered vehicles and focus on diesels, both for new routes and as required to replace trams. With the onset of World War II, the supply of diesel-powered vehicles dried up and the only option for augmenting the fleet was the Fords, which eventually numbered 41 in service to the Board.

===== "Square" =====
The Board's first order for Ford V8 chassis from Canada was for 20 units, of which it took delivery of 10 and then sold 3 to Dunedin City Tramway. The seven remaining chassis were completed with wooden framed, aluminium-panelled motor bodies as follows: nos. 243–244 at Modern Motor Bodies, Christchurch; nos. 245–246 at Crawley Ridley, Wellington; nos. 247–249 were started by the Board but finished by Modern Motor Bodies. Because of their chiselled appearance, they became known as the "Square" Fords.

After entering service between 1942 and 1945, these vehicles made an appearance on a variety of routes: Templeton (no. 243); Avonside (no. 244); Mount Pleasant (no. 245); and the Farmers Free Bus (no. 247). Number 248 was occasionally used for relief duties on the Pleasant Point service.

Numbers 244 and 246 ended their days with the Board, once withdrawn from revenue service in September 1954, as shuttles for staff bicycles between the central city terminus and the Moorhouse Avenue depot, until sold in 1958.

===== "Cream" =====
As production of the Board's preferred vehicles after the war was focussed on war recovery efforts, they decided to order an additional 20 Ford V8s after being offered 10 by New Zealand Motor Bodies in June 1945. These vehicles were manufactured in Petone to a New Zealand Motor Bodies design using steel framing and panelling, and commenced duties in 1946 as numbers 250–269. Though they were painted in the same cream and red colours used on earlier Transport Board vehicles, the livery of all-over cream with a red band on the sides along the bottom earned them the nickname "Cream" Fords.

When nos. 244 and 246 were retired from their duties as bicycle shuttles, the job was taken over by nos. 251 and 254 until 1969 when the Ferry Road depot was opened, eliminating the need to transport bicycles.

===== Number 270 =====
After determining the suitability of the Ford V8s for its Sanatorium service, the Board purchased a Ford V8 chassis and commissioned Johnson and Smith to construct a body for it. Their unique (to the Board's fleet) design, using wooden framing and aluminium panels, featured a short front hood and a seating capacity of 25.

In addition to the Sanitoria service, it was also assigned to the Huntsbury route, and was later used for driver training before being retired from service in 1955.

===== "Red" =====
The last batch of 13 Ford V8s to be added to the Board's fleet were assembled in the Board's own workshops and commenced their duties from 1947 to 1950, numbered 271–283. With wooden framing and aluminium bodywork, their outline was similar to that of the previous batch of Fords. Painted in a style more reminiscent of the livery used on earlier Board vehicles, they became known as the "Red" Fords.

===== Service =====
The Fords proved useful for the post-war expansion of the Board's route network, and in replacing trams as they were retired.

Besides their suburban duties, they were also popular for charter work, including staff social functions. Midland Motorways and Days Motors occasionally hired them to cover their regular services if their own buses were out on other work, and the Railways Department used them for relief services to replace trains when they were non-operational.

===== Disposition =====
The United States Air Force hired nos. 243, 248, and 274 for use as staff transport for Operation Deep Freeze in 1958. They hired a range of buses from the Board each summer for many years until eventually purchasing their own vehicles.

The North Canterbury Catchment Board hired no. 243 in July 1959, after which it was sold in November, along with nos. 248 and 274 in June.

Throughout the mid-to-late 1950s, Nelson Suburban Bus Lines purchased the largest number of the Board's Fords, including nos. 245, 247, and 270 (1955); nos. 253, 255–259, 261, 264, and 266–268 (1957–1958); and nos. 273 and 275–278 (1955–1958). The remaining Fords were sold over the same time frame to a variety of private operators. No. 263 ended up with the Timaru Harbour Board, and was later acquired by the Tramway Historical Society around 1990.

==== Garford ====
A Garford bus was purchased from New Zealand Farmers Co-op in June 1920 with the intention that it would replace the Walker electric bus on the Templeton service. Fitted with weather blinds and solid rubber tyres, its ride quality was no more improved than that of the vehicle it replaced.

When a Leyland bus was assigned to the Templeton route in 1923, the Garford was put on stand-by for relief duties. Later that year, it was used on a short-lived trial service to Pleasant Point.

A report in August 1925 on the performance of the Board's bus fleet mentioned that the Garford had a fuel efficiency of 5.72 miles per gallon. In 1927, the vehicle was scrapped: the body was sold and the chassis was repurposed.

==== Leyland ====
When private operator W. C. Sanders sold his business to the Board following the enactment of the "Motor Omnibus Traffic Act" in 1926, his two Leyland buses were added to the fleet. One of these vehicles was already suitably configured for use as an omnibus and was put to work in place of the Board's older 1923 Leyland. It only remained in revenue service a short time before being converted into a tower truck for maintenance of the trolley bus overhead electrical infrastructure. Sanders' second Leyland, which he was using for his sightseeing tours, was converted into a tip-truck for maintenance of the permanent way along with the Board's older Leyland.

===== Tigress =====
In 1928 the Board sought to add more buses to its fleet to handle an increasing workload. They requested tenders for the supply of chassis and after rejecting several bids decided on two options, including a Leyland Tigress. The Tigress consisted of a six-cylinder engine on a Leyland Lioness chassis, and was the only vehicle of its type in the country. Local company Johnson and Smith constructed a 29-seat capacity body on the chassis. After some initial problems, it served the Board well.

In 1942 the bus was sold to Hobbs Motors of Dunedin.

===== Tiger =====
As diesel buses became available again after the restrictions on their supply following World War II eased, the Board decided to go with the Leyland Tiger and purchased six chassis in 1950. McWhinnie completed the first bus, numbered 284, and the remaining vehicles had their bodies constructed by New Zealand Motor Bodies. In all cases, the buses had the half-cab style front end with a 37-seat capacity. Though capable of displaying destination signs, they were not fitted to show route numbers.

They were unpopular with the drivers for a variety of reasons, including: the synchromesh gearboxes required a lot more work to operate compared to the pre-selector gearboxes in the older buses; the separation of the driver's cab from the passenger compartment made visibility and fare collection difficult; and it was often necessary to exit the vehicle many times per shift using a small side door into the path of oncoming traffic to perform routine tasks. However, compared to the Ford V8s, they were more powerful, had better brakes, and were more reliable.

When replaced by the Regal Mark IV buses later that decade on suburban routes, they were assigned to sightseeing and charter duties and later used on tours.

No. 284 was eventually sold to M. L. Paynter Limited, a building contractor, for use as staff transport. Nos. 285–289 were sold in 1964 to Nelson Suburban Bus Lines. The Tramway Historical Society acquired no. 284 in 1978 from Paynter and it is currently in storage awaiting restoration.

===== Lion =====
The Leyland Lion was out-shopped from Hawke Brothers, who had built the body, in 1978. It was designed to accommodate both seated and standing passengers and was fitted out for the Airport service, to which it was initially assigned.

Three years later it was assigned to the Board's "Be Mobile" service for which it was modified, including the installation of a wheelchair hoist in place of the rear exit. In 1983 it was relieved of these duties and resumed its former role in suburban revenue service.

===== Cub =====
Two Leyland Cubs were purchased in 1984 for the price of one standard-sized bus to provide much needed additional capacity. They, like the Lion before them, were designed to accommodate both seated and standing passengers and were assembled by Modern Motor Bodies Limited. They were evaluated to find the most suitable duties for them, and were found to be most useful on routes where the operation of a full-sized bus was difficult or only light loadings were expected.

The design of the rear suspension made for poor ride quality and, as the Board discovered, made the vehicles liable to experience rear wheel spin. This resulted in an accident in May 1986 when the driver of Cub no. 611 lost control and the vehicle crashed into a tree, with four of the occupants ending up in hospital.

Though number 611 was repaired, both of the Cubs lost favour with the public and they were gradually phased out. When retired from service with the Board, no. 610 was sold to Hamilton City Buses and no. 611 went to Queenstown.

==== MAN ====
The last buses to enter service with the Board, the MAN SL202, were ordered in 1984. Coachwork International was commissioned to assemble the buses to MAN designs, which were built at their Takanini, Auckland (nos. 612–649) and Palmerston North (nos. 650–669) sites. The Board took delivery of the first vehicle, no. 612, on 5 June 1986. After minor fitout changes and staff training, it commenced its duties with three others of the class on 1 August 1986.

Designline of Ashburton also supplied MAN buses to the Board, including no. 670, built to the original German specification, and no. 671, a so-called "midi" bus with a 34-seat capacity. These were intended for suburban routes, while nos. 672–680, based on a three-axle chassis, were intended for use on rural and charter duties. All entered service in 1990 with the Board's successor, Christchurch Transport.

No. 670, while introducing a number of innovations that would later become standard, was not authorised to carry standing passengers, and thus lacked the necessary capacity for use on busy suburban routes. It was to have been deployed on a Rangiora service for which its generous luggage accommodation would be useful, but deregulation resulted in the licence for the Rangiora service being awarded to another operator before no. 670 was delivered. Consequently, it was never used in revenue service, and was sold after being used for a series of demonstration trips.

Red Bus gave the class leader, no. 612, to the Tramway Historical Society in working order on 10 November 2010.

==== Minerva ====
The first Minerva was built in 1928 on an imported chassis with a 29-seat capacity by local firm Johnson and Smith. A second Minerva was added to the fleet in 1931 after the Board was offered a chassis and engine for £750 following the failure of the local Minerva dealer. Johnson and Smith also won the contract for the second vehicle, and constructed a 30-seat capacity body on the chassis with several improvements over the first Minerva.

The first bus was sold in 1942 to Peninsula Motors, Dunedin and in May 1943 Nelson Suburban Bus Lines purchased the second bus.

==== Republic ====
The first Republics to see service with the Board were three model 81s, built on chassis ordered in December 1925 from local supplier, Inglis Brothers. Two of these chassis were delivered later that month. Bodies for these vehicles were constructed in the Board's own workshops with capacity for 23 seats. Initial problems with regulations governing the use of omnibuses saw the maximum loading decreased to 21 seats, but after some modifications the 23-seat capacity was restored.

A fourth model 81 Republic was added to the fleet from private operator C. R. Brown after the Board acquired his business following the enactment of the "Motor Omnibus Traffic Act" in 1926.

After being involved in an accident in 1935, the first Republic was scrapped. The second was sold in 1931 to the Waimakariri River Trust and the remaining two were retired in 1937.

==== Tilling-Stevens ====
The Board purchased two Tilling-Stevens chassis in early 1925, on which it built bodies with a 25-seat capacity. They entered service shortly thereafter but by November of that year serious maintenance issues were evident. In May 1926 they were retired from regular service with the Board and then used occasionally until October to fend off a private operator plying the Sumner route. The following month they were converted into tower trucks for the maintenance of overhead electrical infrastructure. The bodies were sold in 1931 and 1932.

Designed in their native England to operate in cities with a trolley bus network, the Tilling-Stevens buses employed an electric motor to provide motive power. The vehicles were fitted with trolley poles and where available, trolley overhead lines would be used to provide power to the electric motors. The vehicle could also operate away from a trolley network by using its petrol engine to run a generator that powered the electric motors.

==== Trolley buses ====
===== English Electric =====
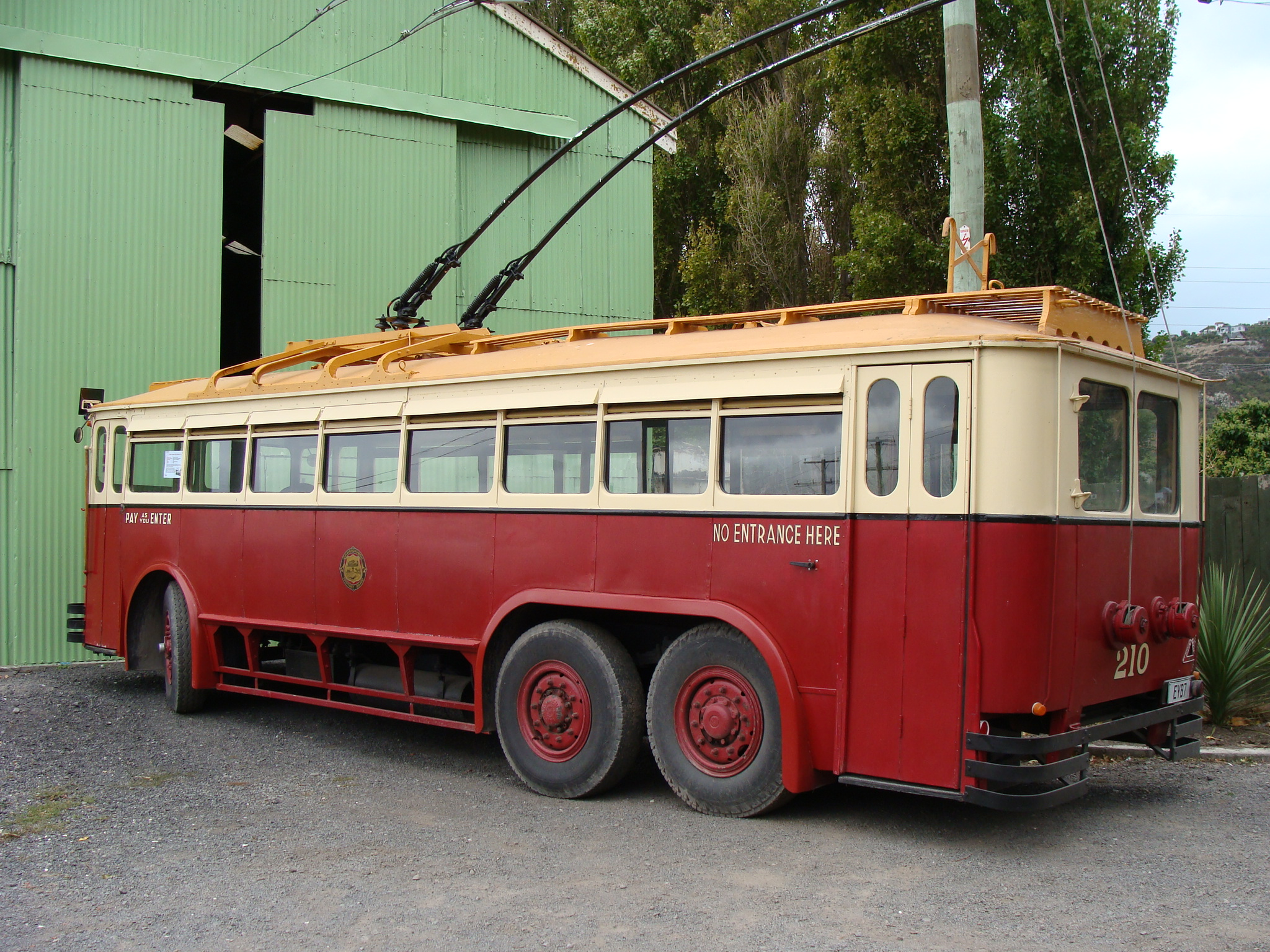
English Electric no. 210

Having decided to use trolley buses on the North Beach route, six chassis were ordered from English Electric through local agent Cory-Wright and Salmon in February 1930. Boon and Company won the contract to build the bodies for the six vehicles at £719 each. As with the body they had constructed for the Walker electric bus, their design for the trolley buses was influenced by their experience as tram builders, giving the vehicles a rather utilitarian appearance. They were the first vehicles in the Board's fleet to have three axles.

One of the biggest frustrations both drivers and passengers alike had with the design of these buses was the narrow front door which allowed for only one stream of people to use it at a time. Drivers had to wait for disembarking passengers to exit before waiting passengers could board and pay their fares. The buses were fitted with rear doors but they remained non-operational, a situation that was not remedied for most of the buses until after they were refurbished between 1948 and 1950.

Most of the vehicles were dismantled and sold to private individuals following the withdrawal of the trolley buses in 1956. Some parts such as the axles typically ended up in other vehicles, e.g. trailers, while the bodies were often used as small buildings, such as sheds. After a period of being used as holiday accommodation, no. 209 was donated to the Tramway Historical Society without its running gear and is currently in storage awaiting restoration. No. 210, obtained by the Tramway Historical Society from Transport North Canterbury in 1965, was restored around 1970. It was overhauled in 2013 and is now currently used at Ferrymead Heritage Park giving heritage trolley-bus rides on special occasions.

===== Ransomes =====
Though the English firm of Ransomes, Sims & Jefferies had not been successful in its bid for the supply of vehicles for the first trolley bus service in Christchurch, they had built a vehicle of the type they had intended to supply to Christchurch and offered it to the Board to evaluate, free of charge, for a year. It arrived at Lyttelton, ready for use, on 21 April 1931 and was numbered 213.

It quickly proved to be a useful addition to the fleet. The first, and only, English Electric trolley bus in service at the time for the Shirley route, opened on 1 April 1931, had to be temporarily withdrawn after a month for upgrades to its bodywork, during which time no. 213 was able to provide relief cover. It was also used for experiments on the Cashmere Hills tram route to test performance on steep terrain. On the morning of 24 May 1931 and the afternoon of 1 June 1931 no. 213 was run along the Cashmere tramline to Dyers Pass Road with one pole on the overhead tram wire and towing a contact line attached to a skate on the tram rail. Though the Board was satisfied with the results, it ultimately decided against conversion of the Cashmere tram route to trolley bus operation.

At the conclusion of the trial of no. 213, the Board decided to purchase the vehicle. When trams were withdrawn from the remainder of the North Beach tramline in 1934, it was decided that that route also would be converted to trolley bus operation, for which it was decided to go with an additional four Ransomes trolley buses. Ransomes supplied the chassis and running gear and the bodies were constructed in the Board's own workshops to a slightly different design than that of no. 213.

The newer Ransomes buses, nos. 214–217, were typically used on the Marshland Road via Richmond route while no. 213 continued to be used on the North Beach route with the English Electrics. To this end, they had separate lanes at the central city depot so the appropriate vehicles were always available.

Most of the vehicles were dismantled and sold to private individuals following the withdrawal of the trolley buses in 1956. After a period of being used as holiday accommodation, no. 216 was donated to the Tramway Historical Society without its running gear and is currently in storage awaiting restoration. The body of demonstrator no. 213 was also preserved by the THS but was destroyed by arsonists in the 1970s.

==== Walker ====
The Board purchased its first bus, a battery-electric Walker vehicle, in 1918. Importer A. R. Harris supplied the chassis, and local firm Boon and Company constructed the body. They chose a design reminiscent of a tramcar, which gave the vehicle an appearance that saw it nicknamed "Beetle".

The "Beetle" bus commenced service on 3 June 1918 but was never popular with the travelling public. The entrance to the vehicle was by way of narrow, steep steps, making ingress and egress difficult; the bus was initially fitted with weather blinds rather than windows, which offered little protection from the elements; solid rubber tyres on rough roads made for poor ride quality; and despite frequent recharging, it occasionally failed to complete a shift without running out of power.

It was initially put to work on the Templeton route, running a shuttle from the end of the Riccarton tramline to the terminus via Hornby and Islington, until being taken out of service in June 1920. Its next assignment was to run an afternoon shuttle service, starting on 2 October 1920, between the Brighton tramline at Linwood Avenue and the Bromley Cemetery during weekends. This proved to be its last public service, ending on 1 January 1922, after which it was dismantled. The body was later lengthened and mounted on another chassis while the Walker chassis was cut up for parts. The Tramway Historical Society have two similar Walker chassis built in 1918 as part of their collection, and intend to restore one of these with a replica "Beetle" body.

== Cultural references ==
AEC Regal IV no. 290, formerly in service with the Transport Board, was used in the filming of scenes for the movie Heavenly Creatures in 1993.

A Transport Board bus appears in a scene from episode 2 of the children's television serial The Games Affair, based around the 1974 Commonwealth Games.

== See also ==
- Public transport in Christchurch
