= Trolleybuses in Auckland =

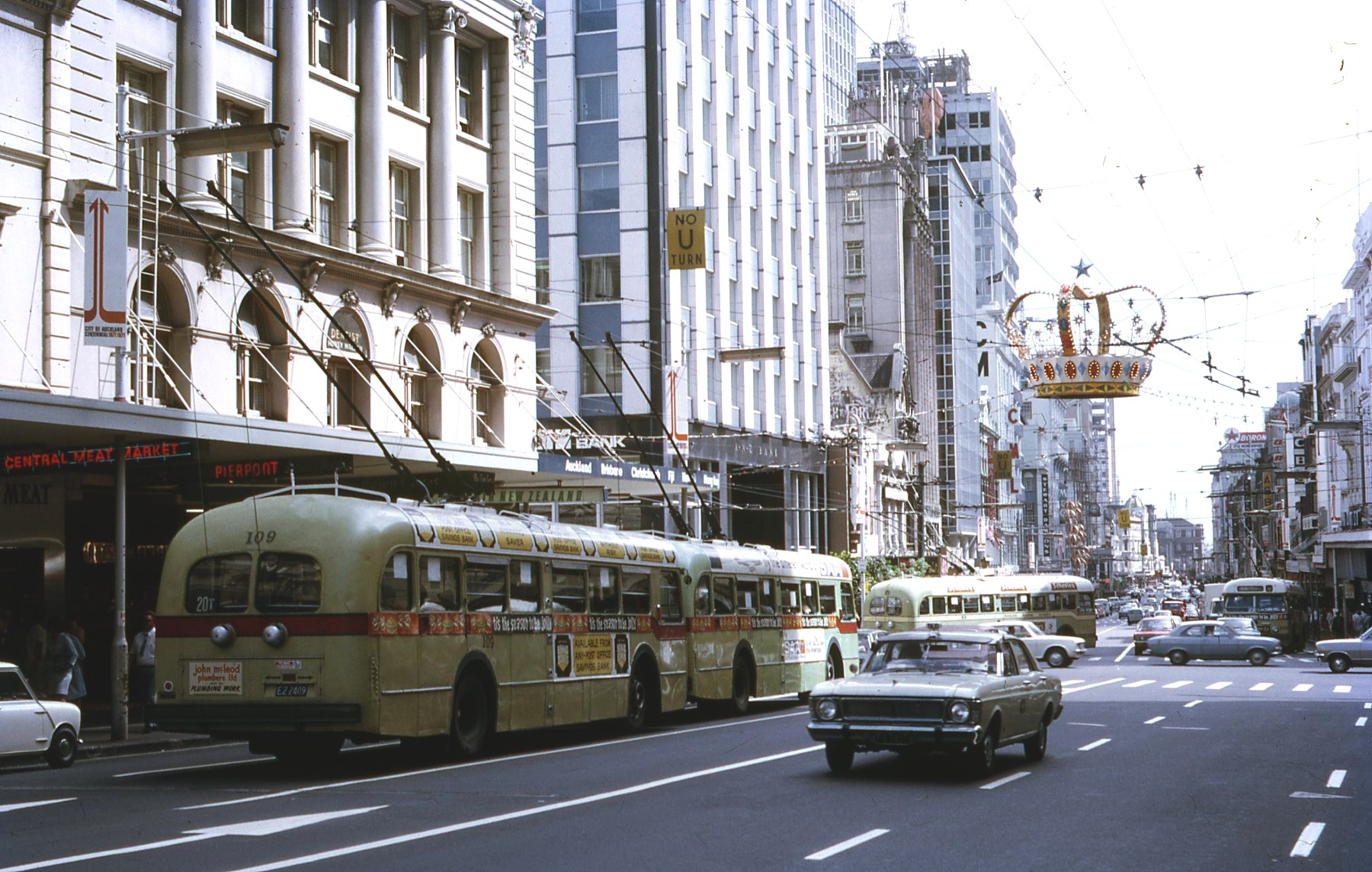
- Trolleybuses on Queen Street in December 1971

Operation
- Locale: Auckland, New Zealand
- Open: 19 December 1938
- Close: 26 September 1980
- Routes: 14 (1960s–70s)
- Operators: Auckland Transport Board; Auckland Regional Authority

Infrastructure
- Depots: City Depot, Gaunt Street

Trolleybuses in Auckland were part of the Auckland public transport system from 1938 until 1980. The first service was a short free route for the Farmers Trading Company department store. From 1949 trolleybuses replaced the city's trams, the last of which went in 1956, and the system closed on 26 September 1980. A replacement system ordered by the Auckland Regional Authority was cancelled in 1981 and its vehicles were sold to Wellington.

== History ==
=== Origins ===
Before trolleybuses, customers were carried between Queen Street and the Farmers Trading Company store in Hobson Street by petrol buses. In April 1937 the Auckland City Council approved an application by the Auckland Transport Board to run trolleybuses around a circuit of Hobson, Victoria, Queen and Wyndham Streets, with one councillor recording his dissent. In July 1937 the board and the company signed a 21-year agreement under which the company would meet the cost of four vehicles and their equipment (up to £14,000) and pay an annual sum of up to £2,500, while the vehicles remained the property of the board and the drivers its employees.

In November 1937 the board accepted a tender from Leyland Motors for four chassis, rejecting the lowest of five tenders as not meeting its specifications, and awarded the bodywork contract to D.S.C. & Cousins. The overhead wiring was erected during 1938, with hooks fixed to buildings used in place of poles wherever possible. Progress was slowed in May 1938 when the bodies, already well advanced, were destroyed in a fire at the builders' premises, and delivery of the electrical equipment was delayed by munitions orders in England. The replacement bodies were built at the board's Royal Oak workshops.

The first chassis was tested under power in Freemans Bay in September 1938, and the first completed vehicle was used to train drivers on the tram network, drawing current from the tramway overhead. Trials over the route followed in early December 1938, including a demonstration run in ordinary traffic on 7 December during which passengers noted the vehicle's power on the steep grade of Wyndham Street and its braking on hills.

=== Farmers' Trading Company service ===
The service opened on 19 December 1938, a route of about one kilometre serving the Farmers Trading Company department store (now the Heritage Hotel) in Hobson Street, travelling via Queen, Wyndham, Hobson and Victoria Streets. It was operated by the Auckland Transport Board with four Leyland TB trolleybuses. The service was free to passengers. It ran from 9 a.m. to 5 p.m. on weekdays, with Friday hours extended to 9 p.m. and a Saturday service until noon, and a circuit took about four minutes; twelve drivers had been trained for it. The four vehicles seated 37 passengers and were finished in green and cream with a silver roof. They were originally fitted with a destination display above the windscreen reading "Farmers Free Bus". The display is blanked on the preserved vehicles.

The service was promoted as the first trolleybus operation in New Zealand to run on hilly streets. In March 1939 a coloured-concrete pedestrian crossing with light signals was built in Hobson Street at the company's expense to serve the stop on the eastern side of the street. In January 1940 one of the four vehicles was seen travelling through Epsom, Parnell and Customs Street after repairs, drawing power from the tram wires with weights trailing behind for the earth return. By 1943 the service was carrying about 2,500,000 passengers a year. The four original vehicles were withdrawn at 9 p.m. on 3 November 1967, after which the service was worked by standard fleet vehicles.

=== Replacement of the trams ===
In October 1943 the board adopted a recommendation that trolleybuses replace the tramway and be extended to new suburban routes after the war. Inquiries were to be made overseas about importing complete or partly built vehicles, with a tentative order for 50 under consideration, and the proposed new routes included Buckland Road, Waterview, Glen Innes and Mount Roskill. The board's chairman said the choice did not rule out diesel buses where they could be shown to be more economic. The Wyndham Street service was cited in 1944 as having proved the system.

In October 1945 the Farmers Trading Company asked the board to replace its free tram service in Hobson Street with trolleybuses, offering to pay the landed cost of the vehicles if the board operated them for 21 years. The company's tram service had special sidings laid for it. In December 1945 the board called tenders for 50 single-deck trolleybuses, 44 of them to be supplied in kit form and assembled locally, with delivery expected to take 18 months or more depending on the supply of parts from overseas. Two board officers who toured transport systems in America, Canada and Britain reported in 1946 that heavy wartime loading and shortages of labour and materials had left the board with a choice between rehabilitating the tramway and replacing it, and they recommended trolleybuses supplemented by motor buses in the more sparsely populated areas.

Ministry of Works plan of the Auckland Transport Board area, 10 June 1949, showing the proposed staged conversion to trolleybuses

A plan of the board's area produced by the Auckland District Office of the Ministry of Works on 10 June 1949 set out the proposed conversion in three stages. The first stage included the Herne Bay, Ponsonby and Richmond Road routes and most of the central city. The second showed routes along Dominion Road, Mount Eden Road, Point Chevalier and Westmere, with possible extensions towards Mount Roskill, a link to the May Road bus depot and a new inner-city route via Symonds Street to Beach Road. Routes to Avondale, Mount Albert, Onehunga, Greenlane and Meadowbank remained tram routes until a third stage.

By August 1948, 55 trolleybuses were on order. They were British United Traction chassis with Metropolitan-Cammell bodies, delivered in kit form and assembled by board staff at the Royal Oak workshop. The first tram route to be replaced, to Herne Bay, was converted on 24 September 1949.

Between 1951 and 1961, further routes were added, with the last trams replaced in 1956. The last trams ran in December 1956. In February 1952 the board ordered 40 more trolleybuses from Britain, at a cost of about £350,000, for the second stage of its modernisation plan, with Saunders-Roe bodies and British Thomson-Houston electrical equipment. The final batch, with Park Royal bodies, was numbered 100 to 133, and No. 133 was the last to enter service, in June 1959.

=== Decline and closure ===
In 1969, a decision to replace the trolleybuses with diesel buses drew criticism from the New Zealand Clean Air Society. From 1973 diesel buses supplied by Mercedes-Benz progressively replaced the trolleybuses on each route. However, the authority's acquisition of private bus operators in the mid-1970s gave some of the trolleybuses a reprieve, and wholesale scrapping began from about 1975. A major problem in the later years was the deteriorating state of the underground feeder cables, much of which dated from the tramway. In 1974, the authority was considering importing overhead fittings from the Soviet Union, a former supplier having stopped making them. The trolleybuses were fitted with warning bells ahead of a trial pedestrian mall in Queen Street in May 1979.

The Meadowbank route closed first in 1968, with contractions continuing throughout the 1970s. Services to Onehunga ended 16 March 1973, on Mount Eden Road in August 1976, on Sandringham Road in January 1977 and on Dominion Road in August 1977.

The system's last regular day of service was Friday 26 September 1980, after 42 years, when the three remaining services ended: the Farmers' free service in Wyndham Street, the Herne Bay route and the Queen Street shuttle. The last vehicle to carry fare-paying passengers was Queen Street shuttle bus 108, which ran into City Depot in Gaunt Street around midnight. On 28 September 1980 the authority ran a free farewell service between the Railway Station and Karangahape Road, using shuttle buses 105 and 115, and 115 was the last trolleybus to return to the depot.

=== Abandoned replacement system ===
Equipment for a new system from Herne Bay to Newmarket had been ordered by 1979. The authority decided in March 1980 to buy 20 new trolleybuses for the Ponsonby and Herne Bay routes. Removal of the old overhead wiring began at the end of September 1980, with new wiring planned for the following year and a fleet of 20 vehicles to serve Newmarket, Herne Bay, Parnell, the city centre and Ponsonby Road from 1982.

In September 1981 the authority's passenger transport committee voted to proceed after costs rose from an estimated $319,000 to more than $1 million a year to ratepayers. In early October 1981 the full authority decided, after almost six hours of debate, not to proceed with the contract with Ansaldo for the 20 vehicles. The vehicles, which had Volvo B10M chassis and Ansaldo electrical equipment, were sold to Wellington, where the city council agreed in February 1982 to buy them for about $3 million. The final cost of abandoning the Auckland system was later put at $3.7 million, against an initial estimate of $0.5–1.6 million.

== Routes ==
Below is a list of routes and their original route numbers (where applicable). Several routes had variations that were identified with a letter, such as 7W, which was a variation of the Owairaka route that ran to Wesley.

Route numbers before the 1974 renumbering
Route	Destination
1	Herne Bay
2	Ponsonby
3	Richmond Road
4	Westmere (via the Zoo); 4Z to the Zoo
5	Point Chevalier
6	Avondale
7	Owairaka; 7W to Wesley; 7N to New Windsor via Wesley
8	Mount Roskill–Richardson Road; 8D to May Road depot; 8S to White Swan Road; 8L to Lynfield
9	Three Kings
10	Onehunga; 10P via Parnell; 10R via Symonds Street and Epsom
12	Meadowbank
20	Queen Street shuttle; 20T and 20G ran alternate directions between the GPO and Karangahape Road; 20R extended to the Railway Station
-	Farmers Free Bus (no route numbers)

In 1974, the newly-formed Auckland Regional Authority progressively rolled out a new three-digit route numbering scheme, including remaining trolleybus routes. For example, Herne Bay changed from route 1 to route 005. Queen Street Shuttles dropped their route number and displayed simply G, T, or R in the route number aperture.

== Fleet ==
Fleet numbers	Quantity	Chassis	Body	Seats	Entered service	Notes
1–4	4	Leyland TB	DSC & Cousins	37	1938	Farmers' free service; withdrawn 1967
5–59	55	BUT 9711T	Metro Cammell Weymann	42	1949–54	Assembled from kits by the board
60–99	40	BUT RETB/1	Saunders-Roe	45	1954–56	Lightweight design; assembled from kits by the board
100–112	13	BUT RETB/1	Park Royal	38	1957–59	Queen Street shuttle layout
113–133	21	BUT RETB/1	Park Royal	44	1957–59	Conventional suburban layout

=== Park Royal vehicles ===
The 34 Park Royal-bodied vehicles had two interior layouts. Numbers 100 to 112 were intended for the Queen Street–Karangahape Road shuttle, which was extended to the Railway Station in Beach Road, and had single seating along one side of the saloon. Numbers 113 to 133 had a more conventional seating layout for suburban operation. The distinction later blurred: No. 115, built as a 44-seat suburban vehicle, was converted to a 38-seat shuttle bus after shuttle bus No. 103 was written off following an accident in 1975.

=== Livery and advertising ===
The original four vehicles were green and cream. The later fleet wore lettuce green with a cream stripe and a silver roof. The Queen Street shuttle buses were distinguished by a red band, carried in the green scheme and in the brighter yellow and cream "custard and mustard" livery introduced with the arrival of the Mercedes-Benz buses in 1973, in which No. 130 was the first trolleybus to be repainted. The rest of the fleet carried a plain cream band in that scheme.

Some of the fleet carried all-over advertising from the mid-1960s through the 1970s.

Examples of all-over advertising liveries
Fleet number	Advertiser	Date
115	Choysa tea	1968
130	Taubmans paints	Photographed July 1971
122	Dominion TV Rentals	Photographed July 1971
66	Alcan aluminium	Photographed December 1971
129	Expandite sealants	Photographed May 1974
78	1ZB radio	Photographed August 1974

In 1968 No. 115 was painted in all-over advertising for Choysa tea, in sky blue with gold and red lettering, and it returned to standard colours when the contract expired.

== Preservation ==
Several vehicles survive in preservation. All four of the original vehicles were handed over by the Auckland Regional Authority to three museums at a ceremony at the Museum of Transport and Technology (MOTAT) on 25 November 1967.

Leylands

- Numbers 1 and 3 remained in Auckland at MOTAT. Number 1 is unrestored and number 3 has been restored.
- Number 2 went to the Wellington Tramway Museum and was towed from Auckland by another bus in December 1967. It was donated to the Omnibus Society in 1999 and is reported to have since been transferred to Ferrymead.
- Number 4 went to the Tramway Historical Society in Christchurch and was shipped to Lyttelton aboard the barge Mohala Pohonui in September 1968 for display at Ferrymead Heritage Park, as part of a collection illustrating the development of New Zealand trolleybus design. The New Zealand arm of Leyland, which had supplied the original chassis, sponsored the wharfage and handling costs. It was in storage at Ferrymead awaiting restoration in 2022.

Metropolitan-Cammell

- Number 50 was donated by the Auckland Regional Authority to MOTAT in 1977 and is on display.

Saunders-Roe

- Number 85 was withdrawn in August 1977 and is held by MOTAT.

Park Royal

- Number 105 was withdrawn in 1980 and is stored at Ferrymead Heritage Park. It was one of the two vehicles used on the farewell service on 28 September 1980.
- Number 108 was withdrawn in 1980 and is held by MOTAT in the yellow and red shuttle livery. It was the last trolleybus in fare-paying service in Auckland.
- Number 115 was withdrawn in 1980 and is also held by MOTAT in the yellow and red shuttle livery. Built as a suburban vehicle, it was converted to shuttle duties in 1975. It was the last trolleybus to return to the depot on 28 September 1980.
- Number 120 is held by MOTAT in the suburban layout.
