= Dunedin cable tramway system =

Cable tramway lines in New Zealand

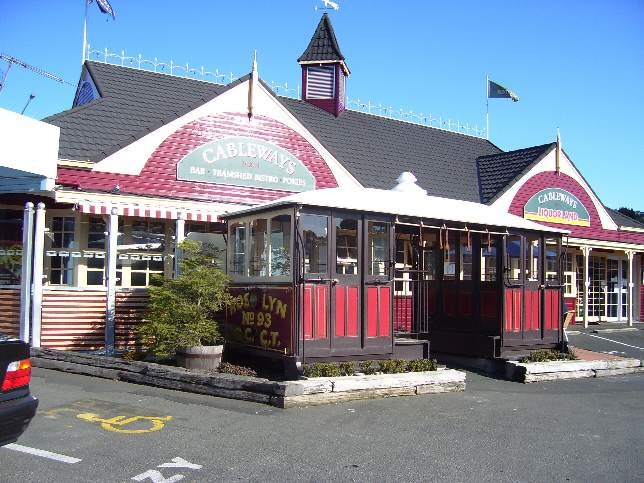
A Roslyn cable car in Kaikorai Valley, Dunedin at Cableways Tavern, near the old Stuart Street Cable Car Terminus.

The Dunedin cable tramway system was a group of cable tramway lines in the New Zealand city of Dunedin. It is significant as Dunedin was the second city in the world to adopt the cable car (the first being San Francisco).

== History ==
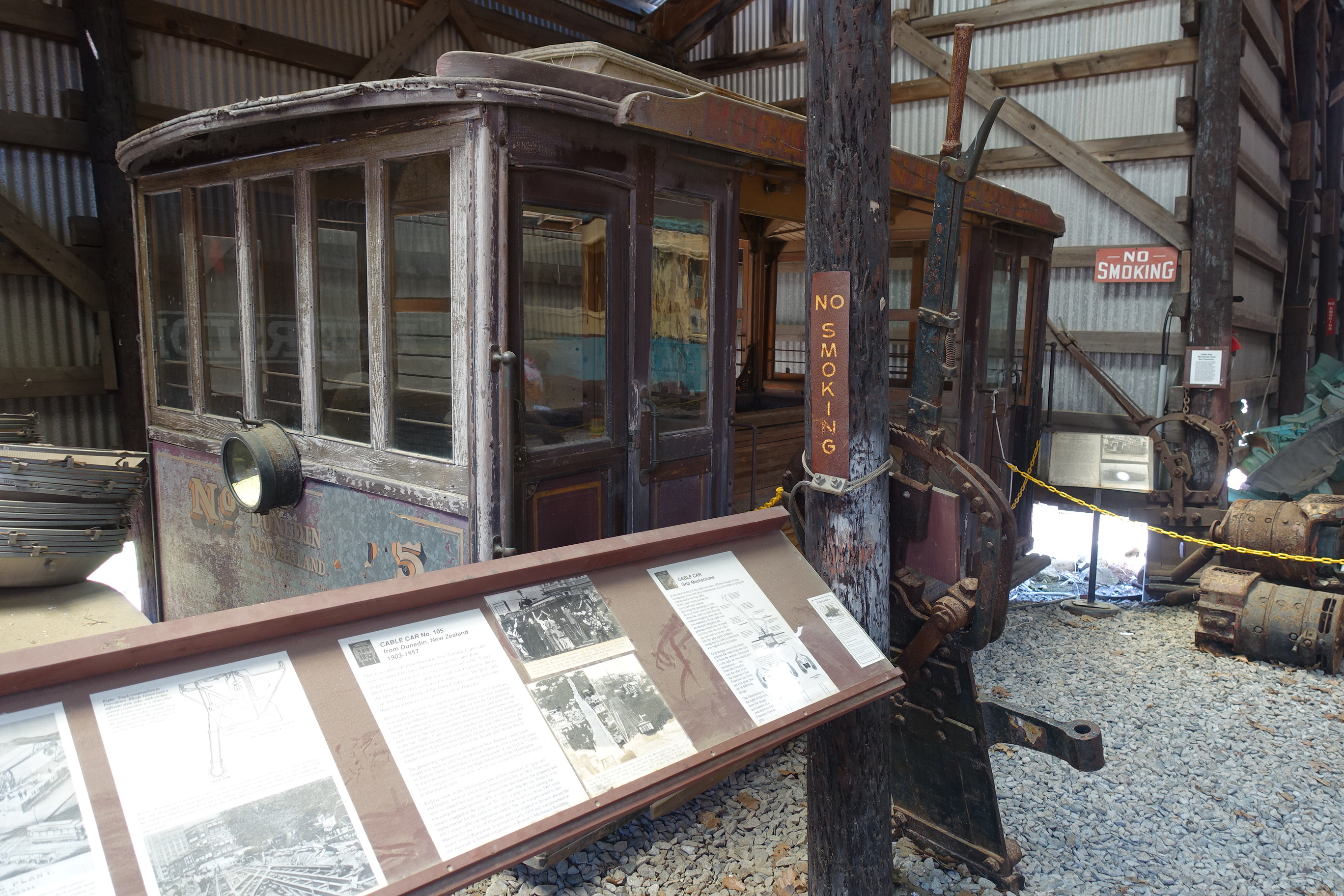
Car #105 preserved at the Seashore Trolley Museum

The first Dunedin cable car line opened on 6 February 1881, the engineer responsible being George Smith Duncan. For this system he introduced the pull curve and the slot brake; the former was a way to pull cars through a curve, since Dunedin's curves were too steep to allow coasting, while the latter forced a wedge down into the cable slot to stop the tram, which was deemed necessary after the line had a runaway tram some two months after it opened.

The last line closed on 2 March 1957.

== Lines ==
=== Roslyn and Kaikorai ===
Dunedin's first cable car served Roslyn (although initially only going as far as the Town Belt), covering a distance of 1.4 miles (2.3 km), opening on 6 February 1881. The line went up Rattray Street, with the world's first pull curve in front of St Joseph's Cathedral. It then cut through the Town Belt in Belleknowes (where the cutting is still generally visible) past the Beverly-Begg Observatory to climb the full length of Ross Street and part of Belgrave Crescent, then descend through a cutting to the valley near Frasers Road.

The last cable car ran on this line on 25 October 1951.

The western section beyond the cutting was too steep for a road link, so, when the cable cars ceased, the portion near Belgrave Crescent was redeveloped as a short street serving several houses while retaining the pedestrian walkway through to Delta Street. Trolleybuses replaced the service as far as Belgrave Crescent, using City Road instead of the straight steep cutting through the Town Belt.

=== Stuart Street ===
Travelling a distance of 1.2 miles (1.9 km), the Stuart Street line opened on 6 October 1900, running largely parallel to the Roslyn line. The track went up Stuart Street from The Octagon, turned half-right at York Place into what was then called Albert Street, continued on past the end of that street through a short section of Town Belt, past Otago Boys' High School, across the bottom of Littlebourne Crescent and up to Highgate at School Street, then dropped down to Kaikorai just before Nairn Street, where a turntable in the road turned cars through 90° and sent them south-west into their shed. The route was eventually turned into a four-lane highway, cutting Littlebourne Crescent off from Littlebourne Road, going under a new bridge and undergoing considerable widening on the Kaikorai side, restricting access to Ann Street and Oates Street. It closed on 31 July 1947.

=== Mornington ===
Opening on 23 March 1883, the Mornington line travelled one mile (1.6 km) up High Street to Mornington. This line was the steepest recorded tramline in the world, with a gradient at the highest point of the track measured at 1 in 3.75.

The High St route had the unusual distinction of running on the right side, contrary to New Zealand road rules; the tramways department decided to correct this in 1926.

The Mornington line was the last to close, on 2 March 1957, leaving San Francisco as the only operational cable car system in the world. Wellington Cable Car, also in New Zealand but in the North Island, is a funicular rather than a true cable car.

Cable Car House (now used by the Mornington Health Centre after the Plumbers moved out) is still clearly marked in the shopping area, having had little external changes since the line closed.

In 2013, a local group announced plans to reinstate this line. The project, estimated to cost $22m, would include a terminus near Mornington Park containing a cafe, museum and storage area for the cable car.

=== Maryhill Extension ===
The Maryhill Extension exited from the back of the Mornington cable car house at the end of Henderson St, following Glenpark Avenue for 0.5 miles (0.8 km). The line was perfectly straight, and was sometimes referred to as The Big Dipper, similar to a roller coaster, going steeply down one side of the valley and then up the other side. It opened on 18 March 1885 and closed on 29 October 1955.

The line was originally operated using two grip trams which were later destroyed by a fire. Later, the line was operated by the former Elgin Road grip tram, DCCT No 106. When this car was being overhauled, it would be replaced by 'convertible' grip tram No 105, which was used as a spare car on the Mornington and Maryhill lines as its grip could be set at two different heights to allow it to run on either line.

Grip tram 106 was withdrawn in 1955 and donated to the Otago Early Settlers Museum where it remains on static display. 'Convertible' grip tram 105 remained in service on the Mornington line until the closure of the Mornington line in 1957 when it was donated in working order to the Seashore Trolley Museum in Kennebunkport, Maine, where it is stored in a complete state along with its grip.

=== Elgin Road Extension ===
The Elgin Road Extension also left the Mornington cable car house, going up Mailer Street and then following Elgin Road for a total of 0.9 miles (1.4 km). It opened on 6 October 1906, and closed only four years later, on 22 January 1910. In contrast to Dunedin's other cable car lines, there was very little gradient on this line. However, the line featured a number of very sharp curves which caused the rope to wear out much faster than those on the other lines.

The Elgin Road grip tram was transferred to the Maryhill line and eventually became DCCT No 106. It is preserved in Toitū Otago Settlers Museum as it would have looked in 1955 when it was withdrawn.

== See also ==
- San Francisco cable car system
- Trams in Dunedin
- Trolleybuses in Dunedin
- Public transport in the Otago Region
- Citibus (New Zealand) (successor to Dunedin's cable car service)

== Sources ==
- The most extensive information including pictures and detailed history
- Kaikorai Cable Cars
- Dunedin's Trams Dunedin City Council
- 1881 Dunedin Cable Car on 1985 35c stamp
