= Tramway Historical Society =

Historical preservation society in Christchurch, New Zealand

- Established: 1960
- Location: 269 Bridle Path Road, Christchurch 8023
- Coordinates: 43.563718°S 172.707889°E
- Type: Railway museum
- Website: www.ferrymeadtramway.org.nz

The Tramway Historical Society Inc. is located at the Ferrymead Heritage Park in the Christchurch, New Zealand, suburb of Ferrymead and operates the standard gauge Ferrymead Tramway. Trams have operated at Ferrymead since 1968, with progressive extensions built between 1970 and 1984 allowing trams to operate within the boundaries of the Heritage Park. The Society also operates and own a collection of historic trolley buses and diesel buses.

== History ==
In 1960, following the desire to preserve trams formerly used by the Christchurch Transport Board, it was decided to found the Christchurch branch of the Tramway Preservation Association. Led by John Shanks, the group campaigned to ensure the preservation of the CTB's last two remaining tramway assets, 1887-built horse tram 50 and 1881 Kitson steam-tram engine No. 7. These had been offered to the Canterbury Museum, but had been refused and so ended up in the care of W. A. Clapham.

As the vehicles were stored outside and were beginning to deteriorate, the Association arranged with CTB general manager John Fardell, who had come from Reading in England to oversee the transition from trams to diesel buses, to provide the Association with covered space in the former Falsgrave Street workshops for five months to carry out restoration work. Fardell and the CTB Board supported this, and so the two trams were stored in the former tramway workshops until 1965. During this time further exhibits arrived such as the Association's first vehicle, double-decker tram trailer 91, which arrived in 1965 and restored three years later.

During 1964, the Association decided to celebrate the tenth anniversary of the closure of the Number 1 tram route to Papanui, which had been one of the final two lines to close in 1954. At the time, contractors had not yet sealed over the tracks between Blighs Road and the former terminus, and so horse-tram 50 was restored to its Christchurch Tramway Company appearance as tram 43, and transported to Papanui where it ran for a week in August 1964. This was hugely popular, and resulted in an increase of membership with the Association, which had become the Tramway Historical Society early that year.

In 1967, the Tramway Historical Society moved to Ferrymead, where it concentrated its efforts on its current site at No. 269 Bridle Path Road. A traverser formerly used at the Falsgrave Street workshops was installed, a new tram barn built, and a short tram line was laid. The resultant tramway was opened on 6 January 1968 by Fardell, with the first tram being Kitson No. 7 with "Duckhouse" trailer No. 115 and double-decker tram trailer No. 91, restored to its original appearance as New Brighton Tramway Company Limited No. 10.

Further work in 1970 allowed electric trams to run under their own power at Ferrymead, with the inaugural electric tram operation taking place on 8 April 1970 using restored Christchurch 'Brill' tram 178. Beyond this, work continued to extend the tramway to the new Ferrymead Heritage Park development, with the current track layout being completed in 1984. A new substation was built in 1988 to power both the THS' trams, trolley-buses, and also the Canterbury Railway Society's preserved ex-NZR locomotives and electric multiple units.

The Tramway Historical Society (Inc.) is registered as a not-for-profit charitable organisation under the 2005 Charities Act. The Society also has a commercial branch, the Heritage Tramways Trust, which was created in 1993 to restore five trams for the Christchurch Tramway. These trams are owned by the THS, but leased by the HTT to the Christchurch Tramway operation.

== Collection ==
The Tramway Historical Society owns a number of trams formerly operated in Christchurch, Dunedin, and Invercargill. It also owns a number of buses and trolley buses from Auckland, New Plymouth, Wellington, Christchurch and Dunedin along with an AEC Regent III double-decker bus, from London Transport, which was brought to New Zealand in 1974 to support the British Commonwealth Games team, and was purchased following the end of the games with the help of a generous donation from Farmers Trading Company. The society also leases Brisbane tram No. 236 from the Wellington Tramway Museum, and has done so ever since 1975.

The society has on occasion carried out work for other groups and museums. Examples of this include the restoration of Roslyn electric tramcar No. 1 for the Otago Early Settlers' Museum, and restoration of several ex Dunedin cable cars and trailers for the new Dunedin Cable Car Trust. Trams used on the Christchurch Tramway are also overhauled and restored here.

== Projects ==
The Tramway Historical Society has several long-term projects along with the restoration and maintenance of historical tramcars, buses, and trolley buses:

- Construction of a fourth tram barnyard on the empty land at Church Corner in Ferrymead Park. This will be based on the CTB Falsgrave St tram barn as it looked circa 1905, and will comprise a two-track shed with an outside shunt road, display offices, Permanent Way yard and overhead department.
- Construction of a 1 MW coal-fired replica Edwardian power house to provide 600 V DC for the THS' trams and trolley-buses, and 1500 V DC for the Canterbury Railway Society's electrified line from Moorhouse to Ferrymead. As of April 2015, the THS had decided not to proceed with the original plan for the power house and was considering redrawing its plans in line with the Society's capabilities.
- Construction of a 26 × 22 m bus barn and workshop behind tram barn No. 1 to hold the seven nominally operational buses owned by the Society. This will also include an archive and administration area. As of April 2015 the necessary land had been purchased for this project and preparations were being made to raise the necessary funding for its construction.
- Building a new bus barn alongside the existing trolley-bus barn at the southern end of the site to hold further trolley, petrol and diesel buses. Owing to the impossibility of extending the original trolley-bus barn, the new barn will be a Totalspan structure similar to tram barn No. 3.
- Completion of the Ferrymead tramway bridge as a static lifting bridge. The bridge is currently part of the Society's running line, but without some of the original componentry, held by the THS in store for eventual refitting.

== See also ==
- Christchurch tramway routes
