= Trams in Dunedin =

Former tram network in Dunedin, New Zealand

Dunedin tramways
- City Corporation tram at Ferrymead Heritage Park

Overview
- Locale: Dunedin, New Zealand
- Transit type: Tram

Operation
- Began operation: July 1879 (steam and horse); 24 December 1903 (electric)
- Ended operation: 29 March 1956
- Operators: David Proudfoot (1879–1883); Dunedin City and Suburban Tramways Company (1883–1901); Dunedin City Corporation (1901–1956)
- Rolling stock: Steam, horse, electric (overhead line)

Technical
- Track gauge: 3 ft 6 in (1,067 mm) (steam and horse); 4 ft 8 in (1,422 mm) (electric)

Trams in Dunedin served Dunedin, New Zealand, from 1879 to 1956. The first system, built by David Proudfoot, opened in July 1879 with steam and horse trams on a 3 ft 6 in (1,067 mm) gauge, and steam was withdrawn in 1884. It was run from 1883 by the Dunedin City and Suburban Tramways Company until the City Council took it over on 21 March 1901.

The Council converted the system to electric traction, which was officially opened on 16 December 1903 and began carrying the public on 24 December. The electric lines were built to a gauge of 4 ft 8 in (1,422 mm), wider than the earlier system.

A separate line to Maori Hill ran horse trams from 1882 and electric trams from 23 October 1900.

Dunedin's electric tramways were replaced by trolleybuses and motor buses, and the last trams ran on 29 March 1956.

== History ==
=== Background (1873–1877) ===
Proposals for street tramways in Dunedin were made from 1873, including a horse tramway in 1874 and a steam tramway in 1876. In October 1876 the City Council invited offers for a concession, and in January 1877 it accepted the tender of David Proudfoot.

In July 1877 the contract was reported to give Proudfoot a 14-year term and an annual rental of £360. He gave notice in the New Zealand Gazette of his application for the city tramways, to be laid to a gauge of 3 ft 6 in (1,067 mm). Work was due to start within six months and finish within sixteen months of 13 November 1877.

=== Proudfoot's tramways (1879–1883) ===
A trial of the steam tramway was held on 23 June 1879, and it was reported to be in partial operation on 7 July, with free trams run on the first day and traffic confined to the Castle Street route because the engines could not haul cars up the rise to the Octagon. Horse trams were announced for Princes and George Streets from late July, and from 1 August the fare on either route was threepence.

In July 1880 Proudfoot gave notice of his applications for tramways in St Kilda, South Dunedin, Caversham and North-east Valley, again to a gauge of 3 ft 6 in (1,067 mm), and the lines were extended to Caversham, St Kilda and Forbury Park from 1880. By 1882 the line to North-east Valley ran as far as Normanby. Proudfoot's St Kilda line competed with the Dunedin, Peninsula and Ocean Beach Railway Company, which extended its line up Crawford Street to the city centre and bought two second-hand steam trams from Wellington.

On 5 December 1880 a fire destroyed the depot near Rattray Street and most of the fleet. Replacement cars ordered from American builders began to arrive in mid-1881.

==== Steam motors ====
Proudfoot was prosecuted on several occasions over smoke and noise from the steam motors, and the courts found in his favour. In September 1882 the City Council resolved that the motors were a nuisance, while the North-east Valley Borough Council resolved the opposite. In March 1883 the Council's Tramways Committee resolved that it would not approve the transfer of Proudfoot's concessions until steam motors were removed or replaced by noiseless engines approved by the city engineer. The engines were removed from the streets in March 1884.

=== Dunedin City and Suburban Tramways Company (1883–1901) ===
A prospectus of November 1882 offered shares in a company to buy the system for £65,000, and in 1883 Proudfoot sold his interests to the Dunedin City and Suburban Tramways Company. By October 1884 the system included an extension to St Clair. In 1887 the company invited tenders for the horsing and driving of its cars, and its report of January 1888 recorded 1,720,759 passengers for the year, a fall of over 50,000.

In 1889 the company faced competition from Cobb and Co.'s "palace cars", whose plant was shipped to Dunedin from Wellington. A correspondent reported that the cars used the company's rails and that the company had reduced its fares to 1d. On 13 September 1898 the company withdrew its service beyond the Botanical Gardens to Normanby after North-east Valley ratepayers refused concessions the company had sought.

==== Proposals to electrify (1892–1899) ====
In 1892 a proposed transfer of the concession to an overseas company was debated, and the Council passed a resolution authorising the overhead trolley system. The system stayed horse-drawn. In May 1899 the company agreed to sell to the New Zealand Electric Light and Traction Company, on condition that the Council consented to electric traction, and the Council instead referred the matter to its General Committee and asked it to consider buying the system. The Council refused the concession, and in September offered £48,420 for the company's property and concessions. The company asked instead for the right to use gas or electric traction, and in October the Council adhered to its offer.

=== Municipal tramways (1901–1956) ===
The opening of the Dunedin Corporation electric tramways, 16 December 1903

==== Purchase and horse operation (1901–1903) ====
A local Act, the Dunedin City and Suburban Tramways Act 1900, authorised the purchase, and a poll of burgesses on the Council's proposals was set for 21 January 1901. The Council raised a loan, but in March 1901 the company's directors delayed completion. The Council took over the tramways on 21 March 1901, and free rides were given to the public that afternoon and evening. The price was later reported as £42,000.

D. R. Eunson, the company's manager, was appointed general manager at £600 a year, a decision carried on the mayor's casting vote. In April 1901 the tramway employees' union presented a statement of conditions that the mayor estimated would cost £10,056 a year more.

==== Electrification (1901–1906) ====
Plans and specifications for converting the system to electricity were being prepared by March 1901, and in January 1902 the Council voted by seven to five to give Noyes Bros of Sydney the contract for the conversion, at ten per cent on the cost of the works. The first sod of the electric works was turned on 26 February 1903. The first public service, to North-east Valley, began on the afternoon of 24 December 1903, under the manager William Goodman.

Each local authority district crossed by a route needed its own Order-in-Council. In January 1905 the Under-Secretary for Public Works reported that orders had been issued for the city and the Peninsula Road district, that Caversham's had just been posted, and that South Dunedin's and St Kilda's were still awaiting plans or amendments. Electric trams started to Caversham on 12 January 1905 but were stopped within hours on the department's instruction, and the Council received authority to run to Caversham via the Main road early in February.

The proposal to take the trams through the Botanical Gardens was reported abandoned in June 1901 after opposition from the Amenities Society and others, though electors were asked about it again on the mayoral poll day on 27 April 1904. The lines were laid around the Gardens, via Howe Street and George Street. In May 1901 residents of Andersons Bay asked for the electric service to be extended to their district, and the Andersons Bay line opened in 1905–06.

==== Expansion (1906–1936) ====
Further routes opened to Opoho in 1924 and to Logan Park and Forbury Park in 1925. Trailers numbered 75–80 were built by the Corporation from 1923 and were used for traffic to the New Zealand and South Seas Exhibition in 1925–26, and in the six months to September 1925 the tramways made a net profit of £7,152 while meeting heavy capital costs for extensions and motor buses. In November 1928 four former Takapuna carriages were reported to have been bought for the electric tramway, and they were later converted to electric cars.

A Dunedin tram in snow, Dunedin, 1939

==== Decline and closure (1936–1956) ====
By the mid-1930s the tramways' profits were falling: in October 1936 the town clerk reported that the city trams had made a profit of £1,353 for the half-year, against £2,739 a year earlier, and that the 40-hour week would add about £8,600 to the branch's costs. The estimates for 1939 showed a deficiency of £8,508 on the city lines and a surplus of £736 on the buses, and in June 1939 the Council adopted a report providing for five branch lines to be closed and replaced by six diesel buses costing about £18,000, in preference to renewing the track and buying twenty trams at a total estimated cost of £199,560; the first change was to be on the Logan Park line. The same month thirteen old trams, including the last six open observation cars, were reported to be condemned for dismantling. The war delayed further change, and in February 1947 ratepayers were polled on a loan of £858,000 to introduce trolleybuses to replace the trams, lift the rails and reconstruct streets. In 1947 the department's engineer-manager, L. C. Greig, reported that 18 trams were being overhauled for the 1948 centennial.

In October 1950 there were 58 trams in service. The remaining routes closed in stages between 1950 and 1956, and the last trams ran on 29 March 1956. Retired trams were sold, many for use as cribs; in July 1953 trams stripped of their mechanical and electrical equipment were sold at auction for between £15 and £70, twenty were being refitted as cottages for a motor camp near Cromwell in October 1953, and seven more were sold in February 1956, the top price of £50 10s being paid for No. 1, "Big Lizzie".

=== Maori Hill line ===
A horse tramway opened in December 1882 from the Roslyn cable terminus in Ross Street to Bishopscourt, via City Road and Highgate. It was replaced by an electric line built by the Roslyn Tramway Company Limited (later the Dunedin and Roslyn Tramway Company Limited), which opened on 23 October 1900 on a gauge of 3 ft 6 in (1,067 mm). It has been described as the first electric tramway in New Zealand. Two boxcars were transferred to the line from the city system in 1923–24 and renumbered 86 and 87. The Dunedin City Corporation took the line over in 1921, and it closed on 1 July 1936. Two of the original cars were sold at auction in August 1938 for £20 and £24.

=== Cable tramways ===
A report to the Roslyn Borough Council in January 1879 on a tramway to Roslyn recommended an endless wire rope system, as used in San Francisco, to deal with gradients of up to 1 in 6. The Roslyn cable line opened in February 1881 and the Mornington line in March 1883.

== Routes ==
| Route | Destination number | Opened | Closed |
|---|---|---|---|
| City to Normanby | 2 | December 1903 | 25 August 1951 |
| City to Gardens (via High, Castle and Howe Streets) | 6 | December 1903 | 24 December 1950 |
| City to Gardens (via Princes and George Streets) | 4 | February 1904 | 7 May 1955 |
| City to Caversham | 9a, 9b | 1905 | 9b (Cargill Road and David Street): July 1938; 9a (Main South Road): 28 August 1954 |
| City to Andersons Bay | 5 | March 1905 (extended 1906) | 8 November 1952 |
| City to St Kilda | 7 | 1905 | 3 March 1956 |
| City to St Clair | 3 | April 1905 | 29 March 1956 |
| City to Tahuna | 8 | 1906 | 6 October 1952 |
| City to Carisbrook | 10 | July 1908 | Between 1943 and 1956 |
| City to Opoho | 12 | September 1924 | 30 September 1950 |
| City to Logan Park | 13 | November 1925 | 24 May 1943 |
| City to Forbury Park | 12 | December 1925 | 24 February 1956 |
| Maori Hill - Roslyn | | 23 October 1900 | 1 July 1936 |

== Infrastructure ==
Dunedin City Corporation tram No. 10 on the Tahuna line

=== Track and gauge ===
The steam and horse tramways were built to a gauge of 3 ft 6 in (1,067 mm), as specified in the notices of application for the city line in 1877 and for the suburban lines in 1880, and the electric lines of the municipal system to 4 ft 8 in (1,422 mm).

The first lines were laid level with the street surface, which left awkward gradients where surface channels crossed the track, and wooden culverts were planned to fix this. In 1881 the City Council objected to the use of plain instead of grooved rails, but the Mayor acknowledged that the Council had no power over the choice of rails.

A prospectus of 1882 gave the length of line then laid as 12 miles 32 chains, with sidings, loops and turnouts.

=== Closures ===
Some sections closed before the rest of their routes, such as the David Street link in July 1938 and the Culling Street–Victoria Road link in 1942.

=== Termini ===
The double-ended trams generally changed direction at termini. Some termini had loops, including the balloon loop at Logan Park and the loop around Plunket Street, Victoria Road and Moreau Street at Forbury Park.

=== Power supply ===
The electric trams were powered from the start by electricity generated at a steam plant operated by the Council from 1903, until hydro-electric power from the Waipori scheme became available in 1907. A temporary steam plant was reported to be on its way from England in April 1903, and when a flood damaged the Waipori supply in March 1913 the Council's steam plant in Cumberland Street was started to supply the trams. The Council held licences for water-races, dams and power-station sites on the Lee Stream and Taieri River from 1903.

=== Depots and workshops ===
The first depot and workshops stood at the foot of Rattray Street, below the old railway station, in a wooden building that had been a church moved from Dowling Street, and a branch from the Exchange served it from the opening in July 1879. A fire destroyed the building in December 1880. A prospectus of 1882 listed freehold stables and tram sheds at North-east Valley, Caversham and the Ocean Beach, and stables on Corporation leasehold land in Cumberland Street. The electric tramway's depot at the Market Reserve in Princes Street, built in 1902, housed the entire fleet until the service closed in 1956.

=== Connections with the railway ===
The 1877 contract was reported to include a clause allowing the Government to connect the main railway line to the branch tramway on the Rattray Street wharf and to run engines and trucks on it free of charge for goods to or from places other than Dunedin. A prospectus of 1882 also referred to a right to lay a double line along Rattray Street to the Steamers' Basin and the wharves.

The Tahuna line included three-rail track, so that New Zealand Railways trains of 3 ft 6 in (1,067 mm) gauge could share it with trams for the cartage of stock to the Otago Agricultural Show each November until 1938.

== Rolling stock ==
Dunedin boxcar trams 10 and 11 coupled together at the tram sheds in Market Reserve

In June 1879 it was reported that the rolling stock would comprise seven engines and 32 imported cars, with six more cars being built locally. Steam motors were supplied by Henry Hughes and Co. (three), Baldwin (two) and Kitson (one), and were withdrawn in 1884; seven names are recorded: City of Dunedin, Empress, New Zealander, Atlantic, Gordon, Washington and Grand Pacific. The original trailers and horse trams, 32 in all, were imported from England, the USA and Norway.

The electric cars were built by J. G. Brill of Philadelphia and assembled in Dunedin, with wheels and axles from Krupp and motors from British Westinghouse. The Corporation's first order was for 14 boxcars, 14 California combination cars and 15 toastracks, which entered service between December 1903 and October 1904. In 1917 car No. 1 was rebuilt as a double-truck car, known as "Big Lizzie", to test whether larger cars suited the Dunedin network. The fleet from 1903:

| Series | Builder | Date | Type |
|---|---|---|---|
| 1–14 | J. G. Brill | 1903 | Single-truck "boxcar" saloon |
| 15–28 | J. G. Brill | 1903 | Single-truck combination |
| 29–43 | J. G. Brill | 1903–05 | Open "toastrack" |
| 44–49 | Dunedin City Corporation | 1913–14 | "Bobtails" |
| 51–62 | Meadowbank, Sydney | 1921–22 | "Sydney Bogies" |
| 63–66 | Cousins, Auckland | 1930 | ex-Takapuna trailers |
| 75–80 | Dunedin City Corporation | 1923–25 | Single-truck trailers (Exhibition traffic) |

== Preservation ==
Several trams from Dunedin's former horse and electric tramway systems survive, with most preserved by the Tramway Historical Society (THS) at Ferrymead Heritage Park in Christchurch. These include restored operational vehicles, tramcar bodies awaiting restoration, and examples retained for museum display.

| Tram | Type | Preservation history |
|---|---|---|
| Roslyn No. 1 (later No. 88) | Electric saloon car (1900) | The body was acquired by the Otago Early Settlers Museum following the closure of the Maori Hill line in 1936. Restored by the Heritage Tramways Trust in 2011–12, it is displayed at Toitū Otago Settlers Museum. |
| Roslyn No. 3 (later No. 81) | Electric saloon car (1900) | Regauged for the city system and converted into a rail grinder and breakdown car, remaining in use until 1948. Its body was recovered from the Hazelwood Travel Hotel in Dunedin and is stored at Ferrymead awaiting restoration. |
| No. 11 | Brill boxcar (1903) | Sold at auction in the 1950s to Mr and Mrs W. Hastie of Pine Hill, where it became a garden shed. Found by THS members in 1965, it was acquired by the THS in 1966 and moved to Ferrymead in 1967; restoration began in 1981, using a truck from Brussels, and it was running again by 1986. It has been leased to the Christchurch city tramway since 1995. |
| No. 18 | Horse tram trailer (built before 1883) | Said to have been built by Guthrie and Larnach of Dunedin. Found on a Dunedin farm, it was preserved by the Otago branch of the New Zealand Railway and Locomotive Society before being given to the THS. Restored in February 1995, it operates on the Christchurch city tramway, normally coupled behind Dunedin No. 11. |
| No. 22 | Brill California combination car (1903) | Carried the Governor, Lord Plunket, in 1904 as New Zealand's only vice-regal tram. Its body was sold to a Heriot farmer in 1953 and acquired by the THS in 1969, and it was restored to operating condition at Ferrymead in 1974. |
| No. 37 | Brill toastrack car (1905) | Withdrawn in January 1951. Its body was recovered from Clutha Cabins in the Cromwell Gorge in 1969 and is in storage at Ferrymead awaiting restoration. |
| No. 52 (Sydney Bogie) | Double-bogie electric tram (Meadowbank, Sydney, 1922) | The body was recorded deteriorating at Green Island. In 2023 the board of Toitū Otago Settlers Museum decided to transfer a Sydney Bogie in poor condition to the THS to be used for patterns and materials, and it was transferred in 2025. |
| No. 66 | Former Takapuna trailer (1923) | Built as Takapuna Tramways and Ferry Company trailer No. 14, it was bought for Dunedin in 1928 and converted to an electric tram. After about 38 years as a crib at Harwood its body returned to the city in December 1994, and the Toitū board decided in 2023 to transfer it to the THS, which received it at Ferrymead on 27 March 2025 for restoration. |
| No. 76 | Former trailer converted to an electric tram (1923) | After retirement, it went to the Clutha Cabins Motor Camp, and in 2020 it was found at Lake Ohau; in 2021 it was reported to be in private ownership with restoration planned. |

== See also ==
- Trams in New Zealand
- Trolleybuses in Dunedin
- Public transport in the Otago Region
