= Trolleybuses in Dunedin =

Former trolleybus system in Dunedin, New Zealand

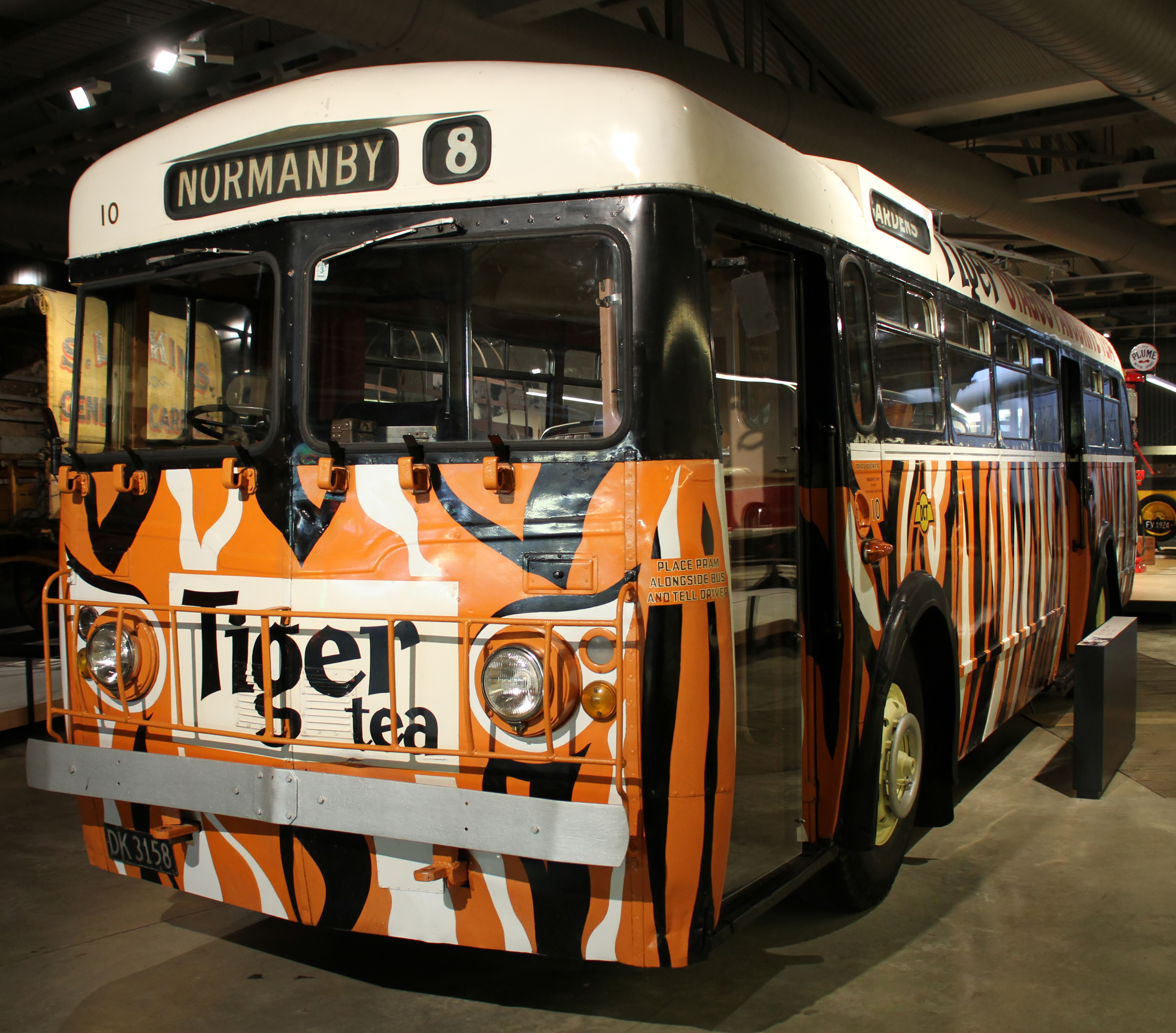
- Preserved New Zealand Motor Bodies BUT RETB/1 trolleybus in November 2016

Operation
- Locale: Dunedin, New Zealand
- Open: 23 December 1950
- Close: 31 March 1982
- Operator: Dunedin City Corporation Transport Department

Trolleybuses in Dunedin were part of the public transport system of Dunedin, New Zealand, from 1950 until 1982. The network was built by the Dunedin City Corporation's Transport Department to replace the city's electric tramway and cable car services, and opened on 23 December 1950 with a service between Bond Street and Opoho. It later extended across the city's northern, western and southern suburbs, and a total of 79 British United Traction vehicles were bought.

After reaching its greatest extent in the mid-1960s, the network was progressively reduced from 1969, and by April 1971 only 52 of the 79 vehicles were still in service. The last four routes, worked as two through services, were withdrawn by July 1979 but restored in August and September, and closed for good in March 1982, when diesel buses took over.

== Background and planning ==
=== Replacing the trams ===
Dunedin's electric tramway, built more than forty years earlier under the supervision of the engineer Sir William Goodman, was by 1944 regarded as approaching the end of its useful life. The city council had been weighing alternatives to renewing worn track for some time. In 1935, for example, it compared the cost of rebuilding the Maori Hill tramway (£6,750) with replacing it by two diesel buses (£4,000) or by three trolleybuses and overhead wiring (£11,222). The council resolved in 1939 to substitute motor buses for the electric tramway, a decision later endorsed by Goodman.

In June 1944 Goodman, general manager of Adelaide's Municipal Tramways Trust, delivered an interim report to the council recommending trolleybuses instead. He estimated that rehabilitating the tramway would cost £334,400, against a capital cost of £346,000 for a trolleybus system, which he expected to earn £68,162 a year over operating costs. Among the advantages he listed were quiet and smooth running, quick acceleration, popularity with passengers and drivers, and the fact that trolleybuses ran on the corporation's own electricity supply rather than imported fuel. He envisaged single-deck vehicles seating 36 with room for 20 standing passengers, with bodies built locally. The Otago Daily Times strongly supported the recommendation, and noted that the interim report made no recommendation about the cable car routes, which were left for the full report.

=== Council decision and loan poll ===
In April 1946 the chairman of the council's Transport Committee, Cr J. McCrae, said the council intended to order enough vehicles for present and future needs, with two doors per vehicle and conductors only at peak times; the council's new transport manager, L. Greig of Edinburgh, was returning from a study tour of British systems. The proposal was not universally popular: correspondents to the Otago Daily Times argued over whether to modernise the trams or replace them. In July 1946 the council authorised tenders for the first 31 of an eventual 79 vehicles, and Cr McCrae hoped to have part of the service running before the city's centennial celebrations in March 1948. The design put out to tender seated 40 passengers, with 2 ft 11 in doors and the rear door placed ahead of the rear axle.

The scheme needed ratepayers' consent to a loan of £858,000 for transport and street reconstruction. A newspaper advertising campaign sponsored by the Dunedin Development Council promoted kerbside loading, upholstered seats and quiet running as reasons to "put Dunedin on the rubber wheels of progress". At the poll on 26 February 1947 ratepayers voted 5,661 to 2,571 in favour, at every one of 36 booths. The loan covered £700,000 to replace the electric and cable tram systems with trolleybuses (with additional diesel bus feeder services), £72,000 for resurfacing streets where rails were lifted, and £86,000 for a new highway to the hill suburbs.

=== Orders and delays ===
The council accepted a tender for 31 trolleybuses, and tenders for the remaining 48, completing the 79 estimated by Goodman, closed in July 1949. The chassis were supplied by Leyland Motors (as British United Traction RETB/1s) with electrical equipment by Metropolitan-Vickers, whose design engineer was due to visit Dunedin in late 1950 to advise the Transport Department.

Preparations were slow. In October 1948 work on the first route had stopped for lack of hardwood poles, and only the Anderson's Bay–Opoho route had been provisionally approved. By July 1949 the council had ordered about £250,000 of material, of which £30,000 had arrived. Chassis deliveries were held up by British production programmes, a dollar shortage delayed overhead equipment, and labour problems in Australia slowed the supply of poles; wire and cable came from Britain, overhead fittings from the United States and poles from Australia. In late 1949 the council's acting engineer, E. E. Read, travelled to Adelaide and Sydney to study trolleybus operation.

== Infrastructure ==
The trolleybus overhead was carried on new hardwood poles beside the existing tram poles, and in places the tramway wiring was temporarily suspended from them. By October 1949 residents were complaining of an unsightly "picket fence" of duplicated poles; the department replied that many would be removed and that steel poles were too weak or too hard to obtain. Power was supplied as direct current by eight rectifier stations, built on the same principle as the existing tramway converter station in Cumberland Street. A new rectifier at Anderson's Bay was to serve the Opoho route. The vehicles' motors were rated at 550 volts DC. The department also set up a tyre servicing and retreading plant at the tramsheds for the new fleet.

The first vehicles were housed at the department's bus and tram sheds beside the Market Reserve, with the intention of eventually keeping the fleet at the Anderson's Bay Road yard. In August 1950 a councillor doubted that the yard could hold the planned fleet, and the Transport Committee chairman replied that more than 105 vehicles might ultimately need housing.

== History ==
Trolleybus on Howe Street, Dunedin, circa 1952

=== Opening (1950) ===
The first (prototype) vehicle was assembled in Wellington, and in August 1950 councillors and Transport Department officers travelled there to attend tests on Wellington's trolleybus overhead. It was due in Dunedin on 15 September 1950 as deck cargo on the Union Company's Wairimu. Drivers were trained on a loop of overhead wire from the tramsheds along Crawford Street. Later vehicles were completed in Christchurch and delivered by road on a special towing truck built by Leyland, with an air-brake connection and a talk-back link to the bus's driver; the second arrived on 7 December 1950 after a two-day, 236-mile tow with an overnight stop at Oamaru, and the third on 17 December. As the service neared its start, parking was prohibited at the new bus stops from 15 December after parked cars had delayed driver training by up to 25 minutes.

The Opoho route was officially opened at 10 a.m. on Saturday 23 December 1950 at a ceremony in Bond Street, attended by the Mayor, L. M. Wright, and the Transport Committee chairman, Cr E. J. Anderson. Three trolleybuses ran the first service, offering free rides until noon, and in the afternoon took over from the trams on the Castle Street route. A 20-minute service was provided, with the driver collecting fares and a second employee checking passengers in through the rear doors at the Bond Street terminus. Anderson said the first route had been chosen as the best training ground for operating the new buses, and that each vehicle would cost £6,000 or more, with the complete replacement of the trams by 79 trolleybuses costing at least £1,000,000.

=== Expansion ===
The council's plans in May 1950 envisaged converting the system in stages, after Opoho: Rattray Street to Roslyn, the Gardens to Normanby, and Crawford Street to Anderson's Bay and Tainui, with a fifth stage between Lookout Point and the Gardens by way of Caversham, Princes Street and George Street. The conversion was still being financed in 1953. By June 1953 a £600,000 city loan at 4 per cent, raised for development works including trolleybuses, had been fully subscribed, mostly by Dunedin residents. A separate "Transport Loan 1953" of £475,000 was authorised for "completing the change-over" of the city's transport to trolleybus operation, with the first £100,000 consented to by Order in Council on 28 October 1953 and a further £100,000 on 24 March 1954. Dunedin's last electric tram service closed on 29 March 1956, and the cable car lines closed progressively, from Roslyn on 26 October 1951 and Maryhill on 29 October 1955 to Mornington, the last, on 2 March 1957.

=== Decline and closure ===
A map dated November 1965 shows the network at its peak. By October 1968 the department was inviting tenders for 17 surplus trolleybus chassis, spare parts, trolley wire, overhead fittings and hardwood poles, and in February 1971 for ten trolleybuses and further surplus equipment. By April 1971, 52 of the 79 vehicles bought were still in service, and No. 3, one of the original vehicles, had been withdrawn in January. The first route closures had been to Bradford in 1969 and to Belgrave Crescent and Māori Hill in 1970. Despite strong public opposition to the withdrawals, especially on the hill routes, the system was scheduled to close in 1974, but the first world oil crisis gave it a further five years. The network was progressively reduced until only four routes remained, worked as two through services (Opoho–Shiel Hill and Normanby–St Clair). The Opoho–Shiel Hill services closed in December 1978, and it was reported that the route had also been closed in 1973.

The last remaining services, to Normanby and St Clair, were withdrawn on Friday 6 July 1979, coinciding with celebrations of the centenary of Dunedin's public transport. The council had already said it would review its policy on keeping the vehicles and their overhead wires, and in June its acting transport committee chairman, Cr I. W. McMeeking, argued that the fleet should be mothballed, citing the prospect of carless days and possible diesel shortages for essential industries.

=== Reopening and closure ===
Trolleybus services were reinstated amid concerns about fuel supplies during the 1979 oil crisis, the overhead having been left in place after the withdrawal. Normanby–St Clair resumed on Monday 13 August 1979 and Opoho–Shiel Hill on Monday 10 September 1979. The network stayed open for another two and a half years. By February 1982 it was reported that closure during March was certain. On 27 March 1982 the council invited tenders for surplus trolleybuses and equipment, suggesting that the vehicles could be converted into mobile caravans, workshops or holiday homes. The last trolleybuses ran on 31 March 1982, and diesel buses took over. In July 1982 a former Dunedin trolleybus, described as the last in service in the city, was towed from Christchurch to Ferrymead for preservation.

== Routes ==
The first route ran from Bond Street through Castle Street to Opoho. As planned in August 1950 it was to run from the tramsheds via Anderson's Bay Road, Crawford Street, Water Street, Bond Street, Lower High Street, Castle Street, Howe Street and King Street (with a turning point at the Gardens) to Opoho, via Opoho Road and Signal Hill Road to a terminus above Grandview Crescent.

The network subsequently expanded across Dunedin's northern, western and southern suburbs. A map dated November 1965, showing the system at its greatest extent, identifies 14 destinations:

- Central and northern: Railway Station, Botanic Gardens, Normanby and Opoho.
- Western: Māori Hill, Halfway Bush, Belgrave Crescent, Bradford and Balaclava.
- Southern and eastern: Caversham, St Clair, St Kilda, Shiel Hill and Ocean Grove.

The map also shows turning circles at Mornington, Nairn Street (Kaikorai) and Tainui Road, which allowed short workings. A 1955 photograph shows a trolleybus bound for Nairn Street, in the Kaikorai Valley, at Highgate Bridge over Stuart Street.

=== Final network ===
From 1979 until closure in 1982 the network consisted of four routes, numbered as two through-worked pairs:

Route	Terminus	Notes
2	Normanby	linked with route 3
3	St Clair	linked with route 2
5	Shiel Hill	linked with route 8
8	Opoho	linked with route 5

== Operations ==
At opening, the service was operated by one person with an additional checker at the terminus, with conductors planned for peak times. The Transport Department called tenders for the right to advertise on the fleet and posted notices in the vehicles offering a £5 reward for information leading to convictions for vandalism.

== Fleet ==
The fleet comprised 79 BUT RETB/1s built between 1950 and 1962. The prototype, No. 1, was built in Wellington. Bodies for Nos 2–55 were built by New Zealand Motor Bodies at its Christchurch plant and the vehicles delivered to Dunedin by road, while Nos 56–79 were built in the Transport Department's own workshops. By 1958 the workshop was experimenting with materials, using a fibreglass dome and corner panels on one new vehicle and an aluminium rather than laminated-timber roof frame on another. In 1971, No. 3 was described as a 40-seater with a 17 ft 6 in wheelbase and a length of 33 ft 4 in, powered by a 135 horsepower, 550 volt DC motor. Safety features included a run-back brake that stopped the bus if the driver released the controls, and a coasting brake limiting speed on long descents to 14 miles per hour.

Fleet numbers	Quantity	Chassis	Body	Entered service
1–55	55	BUT RETB/1	New Zealand Motor Bodies	1950–1956
56–79	24	BUT RETB/1	Transport Department (Dunedin)	1952–1962

=== Livery and advertising ===
Vehicles were delivered in a two-tone livery of pale primrose yellow on the upper half of the body and terracotta below, with cream-painted wheels. Early vehicles had a black stripe separating the two colours. In the 1970s the standard livery changed to all-over primrose yellow, with a terracotta strip on the lower third that looped over the top of the vehicle behind the front doors.

Advertising on the fleet was anticipated from the start: the Transport Department called tenders in November 1950 for advertising rights on the trolleybuses. Full-body advertising liveries were a feature of the system, including vehicles advertising Kent (heating fuels), Barton's butchers, Tiger Tea (in two designs), Holsum bread, City Motors, Shiel and Zephyr Heaters, among others. The best known is the second "Tiger Tea" livery, applied to No. 10 in 1976, which it continues to wear in preservation.

Dunedin trolleybuses with all-over advertisements
Dunedin trolleybus number 76 advertising Zephyr Heaters

Three Dunedin trolleybuses parked at the city depot, with all-over advertising for Holsum, City Motors and Shiel

Dunedin trolleybuses parked at the depot. Two buses have all-over advertising painted on them, for Tiger Tea and Barton's store.

Tiger Tea Trolleybus number 10 at Toitū Otago Settlers Museum

== Preservation ==
Several Dunedin trolleybuses survive:

- No. 10, in "Tiger Tea" advertising livery from 1976 and the highest-mileage Dunedin trolleybus (536,827 miles), is in the care of the Toitū Otago Settlers Museum, where it has been since 1992.
- No. 5, with a New Zealand Motor Bodies body, entered service on 13 April 1951; it was bought from the Transport Department by an enthusiast, Earl Ewers, and donated to the Tramway Historical Society at Ferrymead Heritage Park.
- No. 79, with a Dunedin-built body, entered service on 11 September 1962 and was withdrawn on 18 March 1982; it is also with the Tramway Historical Society.
- No. 3, one of the original vehicles, was sold by tender and towed to Christchurch in April 1971 for display at the Yaldhurst Transport Museum.
- No. 1, the prototype built in Wellington, was acquired by the Wellington Tramway Museum in 1966 and carried by road transporter to Christchurch and by ferry to the North Island for display at Queen Elizabeth Park, Paekākāriki; it was later operated at the museum; in 2013 the Otago Heritage Bus Society began fundraising to return it to Dunedin.
- Nos 43 and 76 were part of the Foxton collection in 2008.

== See also ==
- List of Trolleybus systems in New Zealand
- Trams in Dunedin
- Cable Trams in Dunedin
- Public transport in the Otago Region
