= Christchurch tramway routes =

Trams in New Zealand

Christchurch tramway routes have developed from lines that were first established by a troika of private tramway companies in the latter part of the 19th century, through to a significantly expanded system under the municipal Christchurch Tramway Board, to the City Council-built heritage circuit. These routes have been worked by all three main forms of tramway motive power (horse, steam, electric) and have significantly contributed to the development of Christchurch City in New Zealand's South Island.

Currently, tramway routes in Christchurch are limited to the central city heritage circuit and the heritage line at the Ferrymead Heritage Park. A two-stage extension of the heritage circuit has been planned, with the first stage currently under construction.

== Private era: 1880–1906 ==
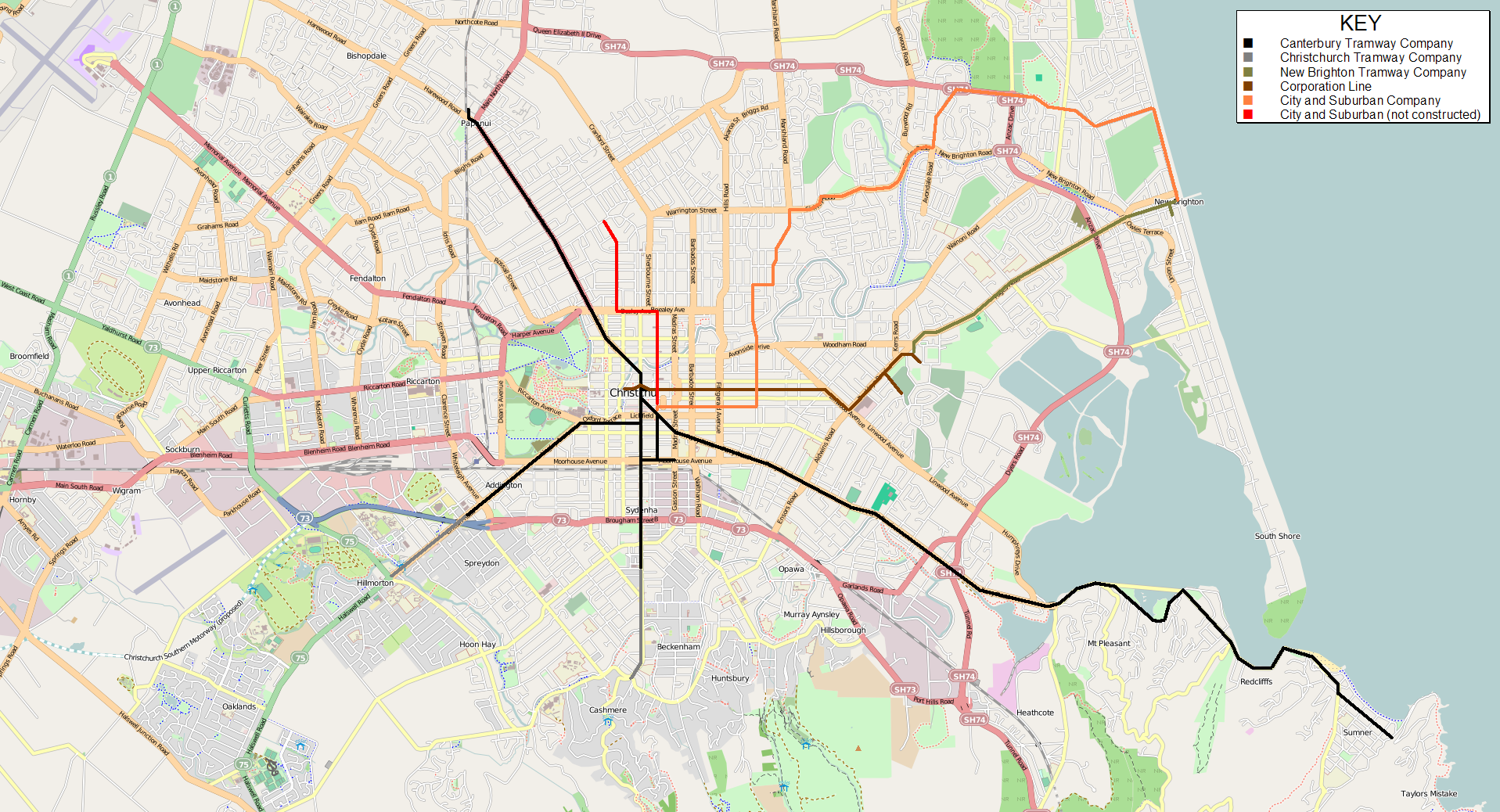

=== Canterbury Tramway Company lines ===
The Canterbury Tramway Company first met with the City Council on 4 March 1878 to discuss its plans. The Company made it known that it intended to construct and operate the following lines:

- A line from Papanui to Christchurch.
- An extension of this line to the Christchurch railway station.
- A Branch to a Terminus south of the Agricultural Show Grounds.
- A Branch connecting Addington with the centre of Christchurch.
- An extension to Heathcote with a view ultimately of continuing the line to Sumner.

After several meetings the Company reached agreement with the Council on the terms for its operation and also successfully concluded negotiations over the following months with other local bodies in whose jurisdiction its lines would be built. Authorisation to proceed was granted to the Company in September of that year.

Over the next 15 months the company made preparations for the commencement of its operation. Equipment was ordered including five steam motors from Kitson and Company and nine double-decker tramcars from John Stephenson and Company. In December 1879 it let a contract for the construction of the line from Cathedral Square to Christchurch Railway Station to John Barratt. Construction officially began with a "turning-of-the-first-sod" ceremony on 11 December 1879 at which various representatives of the councils concerned and members of the company were present. Following completion of the line early in the New Year, trials of the newly landed steam motors took place from late February 1880.

An official Government inspection of this line was carried out on 6 March and was followed three days later by the commencement of revenue services. Some issues became apparent on the first day of operation, which resulted in the suspension of services until 16 March while the problems were remedied. Despite this minor setback the service quickly became popular with the public and was well patronised.

By the end of the year the Company's network had expanded by about 4.5 miles (7.2 km) including the opening of new lines to Papanui (24 June), an alternative route to Christchurch Railway Station via High and Manchester Streets (24 July), and a line to the Agricultural Show Grounds (6 August).

All services were initially run with steam motors for which Christchurch's terrain was ideally suited. Horse motive power, often introduced first elsewhere, was not used in Christchurch until 1882. Following its introduction, horses gradually received more of the workload as they were found to be more cost effective for shorter and more lightly patronised lines.

The Company's early years were quite successful with growth in patronage necessitating the purchase of additional rolling stock. Expansion of the business also included the opening of new lines to Addington Railway Station (5 January 1882), an extension to the Addington Show Grounds (about 28 October 1887), Woolston (7 July 1882), an extension to Heathcote (9 December 1882) and to Sumner (1 November 1888). Of its 17 miles (27 km) of tramway at the end of 1888 the lines to Papanui and Sumner proved to be the most lucrative.

Prior to the completion of the Sumner line beyond Heathcote the company had run a connecting service between Heathcote and Sumner using the steamer Colleen. This proved to be an unsuccessful venture but it was clear to the company that either it had to provide a Sumner service or someone else would. It had always intended to build a line to Sumner and construction on this extension began in mid-1888. Experienced tramway construction contractor John Brightling and the partnership of Knight and Honeybone undertook the work. By October the line was finished save for a small amount of work outstanding at the Sumner terminus, which was not completed until early 1890.

An excursion for a group of women from Sumner was the first public trip on the line on 1 November 1888. Thereafter the timetable scheduled ten services per day at about one hour to cover the 8 miles (13 km) distance between Sumner and the city.

Public holidays and weekends during the summer months were the best times for the Sumner line when the residents of Christchurch sought respite from city life with a day out at the seaside town of Sumner. Almost all services on the Sumner line were steam-hauled though occasionally horses were used for special services.

=== Corporation Line ===
The establishment of a cemetery at Linwood and a desire to improve access to a nearby council reserve prompted the City Council to decide on 31 March 1884 that it would construct its own tramway line from the central city. It became known as the Corporation Line and its purpose was threefold:

- To convey funeral traffic to the Linwood Cemetery.
- To cart rubbish and nightsoil to the Council's reserve.
- To run a passenger service.

The Mayor and Mayor-elect, Charles Hulbert and Aaron Ayers, ceremoniously laid the first rail on 26 November 1885 at Latimer Square. Construction contractor John Brightling quickly finished the job, completing the line by March 1886.

The line began at the Council's yard on Oxford Terrace, ran along Worcester Street, Linwood Avenue, Buckleys Road, Butterfield Avenue, and into the cemetery reserve. Another branch ran further up Buckleys Road into Rudds Road and then to the Council Reserve.

After a trial run on 24 March ended disappointingly, modifications were made to one of the curves where the tramcar had derailed. The line was officially opened on 23 April 1886.

Horses typically worked the line with steam motors being used for through services where necessary. In the case of the New Brighton Tramway Company these had to be hired from the Canterbury Tramway Company.

=== New Brighton Tramway Company line ===
News that the city council was to construct the Corporation Line was greeted favourably by the residents of New Brighton, then a small and isolated seaside town. They viewed it as an opportunity to finally get a tramway connection with Christchurch and to this end formed the New Brighton Tramway Company in mid-1885 with the intention of constructing and operating a line from the end of the Corporation Line to a terminus at New Brighton.

Construction soon commenced at the Linwood end with 2 miles (3.2 km) having been completed by 14 October 1886. Work started not long afterwards from the New Brighton terminus and, despite some difficulties being encountered where the line passed through sand hills, the line was completed by January 1887.

The route, the subject of much debate, was finally settled on starting at The Junction (with the Corporation Line), running up Coulter Street, Pages Road, and Seaview Road before turning right into Oram Avenue where the Company's stables were located, a distance of 2 miles 61 chains (4.4 km).

The first service, a trial run, took place using a steam motor hired from the Canterbury Company on 8 January 1887. No problems were reported and thus revenue services commenced on 15 February with five trips daily being scheduled.

The Company never owned any steam motive power, preferring to use horses, as they were more economical. However, steam motors were used on the line owing to an arrangement the Company made with the Canterbury Tramway Company (then operator of the Corporation Line) to run through services along both the Corporation Line and the New Brighton Tramway Company's line.

The line remained in operation under the Company's ownership until acquired by the Christchurch Tramway Board in 1906.

=== City and Suburban Tramway Company line ===
The City and Suburban Tramway Company was formed with the intention of constructing two lines, both starting at the intersection of Manchester, High, and Lichfield streets, and terminating at the north end of Springfield Road and at New Brighton. As it eventuated, only the latter of these two lines was actually built.

John Brightling won the tender for the construction of the line, let in three sections, and commenced work on 1 May 1893, expecting to complete the line by the end of the year. He quickly made good progress and by the end of August had reached near Burwood School. It was at this point that the Company experienced financial problems and was unable to commission the remainder of the line. Brightling took matters into his own hands and obtained a debenture over the company, allowing him to complete the line to New Brighton in August 1894.

The route, starting in Manchester Street, ran along Cashel Street, Stanmore Road, North Avon Road, North Parade, and New Brighton Road. After crossing open country it joined up with and ran along Travis Road, crossed some open country again, and turned into Bowhill Road, then into Marine Parade and terminated at the intersection with Seaview Road.

Services were progressively commenced, as sections of the line were completed and ready for use. The first section, to Stanmore Road, was opened on 1 September 1893, followed by Burwood on 17 October 1894 and the New Brighton pier on 25 October. As the Company's first two vehicles were not ready until October 1893 services were initially provided using a vehicle hired from the Canterbury Tramway Company. The Order-in-Council granted to the Company only permitted the use of steam motive power between Burwood and New Brighton but it is believed to be unlikely that the Company ever actually used steam motors.

After the Company's failure in 1895 it was sold to its debenture holder, John Brightling, who continued to operate the line until its sale to the Christchurch Tramway Board in 1906.

=== Christchurch Tramway Company extensions ===
The Christchurch Tramway Company had an auspicious beginning with a large amount of new capital it was hoped that it would succeed where its predecessor, the Canterbury Tramway Company, had failed. It acquired the assets of the old company and set about a programme of maintenance and improvements including the following measures:

- The line between the central city and Christchurch Railway Station along Manchester Street was lifted.
- Steam motors were withdrawn from all lines, save for the Sumner route, in favour of horses.
- The Papanui line was relaid.
- New stables were erected in Worcester Street to house the increasing number of horses.
- Ongoing maintenance included the overhaul of vehicles and relaying of other lines.

It was during the Company's tenure that two extensions were constructed. First, the Addington line was extended to Sunnyside Asylum by the end of 1895 with revenue services commencing from 1 January 1896. Second, the Sydenham line was extended to the foot of the Cashmere Hills with revenue services commencing 7 December 1898.

When the issue of the renewal of its concessions arose in the mid-1890s the Company sought extensions as not only would they be required to continue to operate but also to provide some certainty in its future for investment decisions to be made. It was decided, however, to municipalise the tramways so the Company continued in operation until 1905 when the Christchurch Tramway Board acquired its assets.

== Christchurch Tramway Board era: 1905–1954 ==
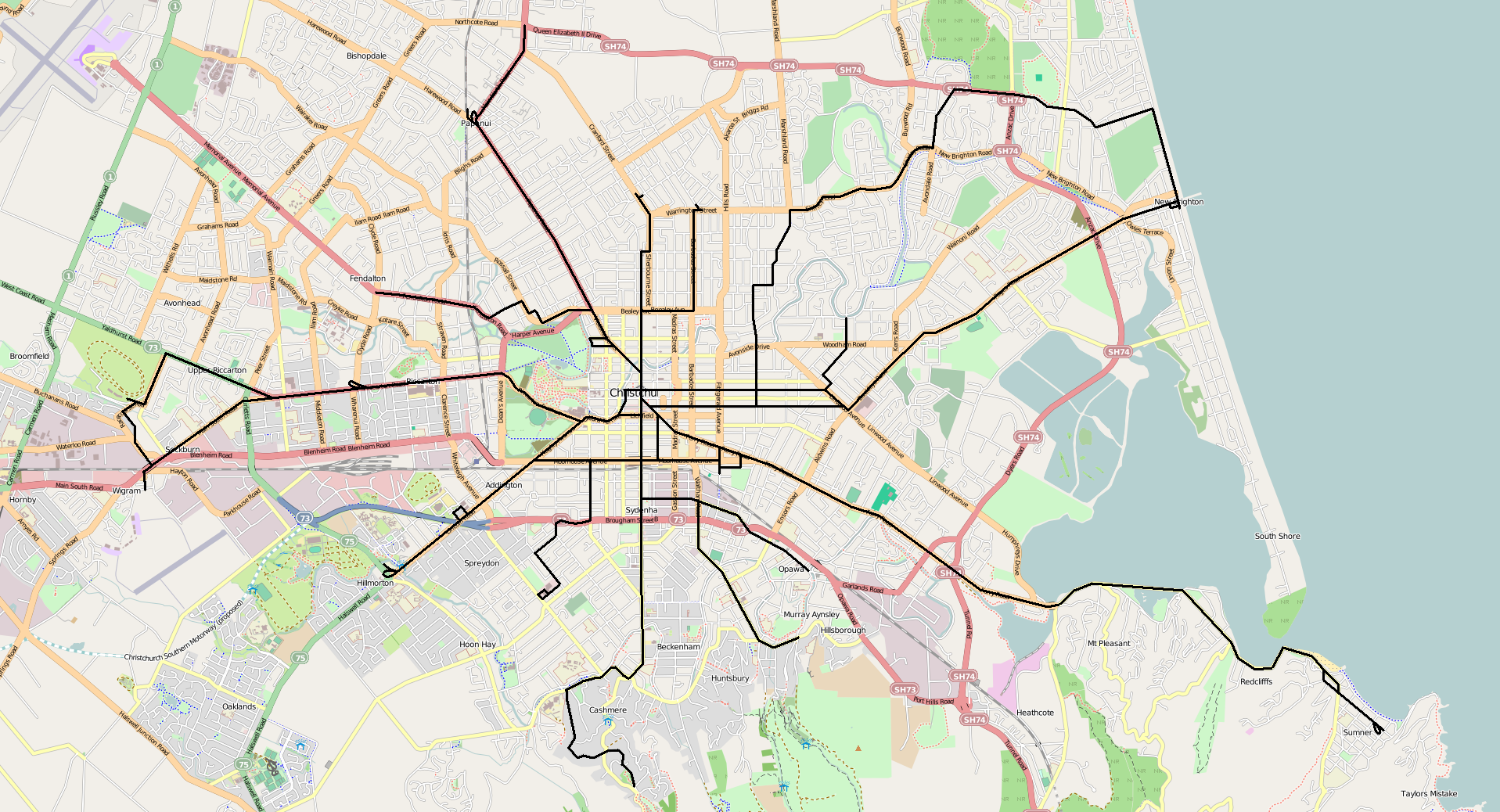

=== Papanui line ===
The line to Papanui was originally established by the Canterbury Tramway Company and later operated by its successor, the Christchurch Tramway Company, before being acquired by the Christchurch Tramway Board in 1905. It provided a direct link from the Papanui railway station to the central city and had been in operation since 1880.

As one of the lines acquired from the private tramway companies, it was included in the initial contract for construction and electrification. Trial runs between the Falsgrave Street car shed and Papanui began in late May 1905 including a rehearsal on the evening of 2 June for the opening day procession. The programme for opening day, 5 June 1905, involved a procession of seven trams running from the car shed to Papanui via Cathedral Square. Despite an accident en route which required the removal of two of the cars from service, the official party reached their destination where the festivities were concluded as planned.

A balloon loop was installed at Papanui in August 1922 so rakes of trailers could be turned without holding up traffic by shunting them in a loop on the road. This was to be the first in Christchurch, predating the many wyes and loops that were later installed to facilitate the operation of one-man trams.

An extension of the Papanui line up Main North Road to Northcote Road, near St. Bedes College, was opened on 1913-2-28. However, it proved to be the shortest-lived line in the network when, in 1930, the Waimairi County Council decided to rebuild the section of Main North Road in their jurisdiction in concrete. As this work would require the replacement of tram tracks on the affected section of the road, and this could not be justified on the basis of revenue received from the line, the Board made the decision to close the line for which an Order-in-Council was signed on 1930-8-5. Despite the closure of the line being sanctioned, the Board was not permitted to actually close the line until a replacement bus service had been arranged. In the absence of a willing private operator, the Board provided the service itself, and the line was duly closed on 1930-9-30, being the first line to be closed by the Board.

The next part of the line to be reviewed was the short spur connecting the Papanui Township to the Papanui railway station. This was a feature of the line inherited from the Christchurch Tramway Company and many people considered it a convenience to connect with trains on the north line at Papanui and travel by tram between there and Cathedral Square. As part of the spur was on Railways Department land an annual fee was payable by the Board to the Department for the privilege. In light of the economic difficulties faced by the Board at the time, and the steadily declining patronage of the line since they assumed control of it, they questioned in June 1932 whether or not it was worthwhile to continue the service. On becoming aware that the spur was to be closed, the Railways Department protested, despite having previously shown little interest in it, to the extent that they waived the annual fee for the use of their land. A decision on the future of the spur was postponed but by 1934 there was hardly anyone using it. The Board proceeded to close it and from 1934-4-16 implemented a new timetable that linked the Papanui line with the Cashmere line and removed the railway station service. The Papanui line had previously been linked with services to Christchurch railway station since it opened in 1905. The track for the spur was, however, left in situ and used for the storage of trailers until the Papanui line was closed.

The last tram route in operation was Papanui–Cashmere on which the last revenue services ran on Friday 1954-9-10. By the time the ceremonial "last trams" ran the following day the replacement bus service had already commenced.

A short section of the line between Blighs Road and the terminus, relaid in concrete in September 1951, remained visible until the road was reconstructed in 1966.

The route the line took north from the central city used a road that ran diagonally through Victoria Square. This road was blocked off and removed in 1988 to allow for the construction of the Parkroyal Hotel. The Christchurch earthquakes of 2010 and 2011 have resulted in a decision to demolish the hotel, now known as the Crowne Plaza Hotel, which may allow for the road to be re-established.

=== Cashmere line ===
The Cashmere line was established by the Canterbury Tramway Company in 1880 and extended by its successor, the Christchurch Tramway Company, in 1898. The Christchurch Tramway Board acquired it in 1905.

As one of the lines purchased by the Board from the private tramway companies, the Cashmere line was included in the initial contract for construction and electrification of the Board's tramway network. During this phase, services were maintained using rolling stock acquired from the private tramway companies. Electric services commenced on 1905-8-16 to the bottom of Colombo Street.

Construction of the Cashmere Hills extension commenced several years later and by late 1911 had reached the foot of Hackthorne Road. Work started on the Hills section early the following year and within a few months had reached the terminus at the Sign of the Takahe. Services began on 1 May and quickly became one of the most popular routes in the whole network.

The Hills extension, the only such section of line operated by the Board, presented it with several new challenges. Such was the concern about the dangers of stopping and starting on a slope that additional training was necessary for the motormen who worked the route and they were required to test their brakes before taking their trams out on duty. Also, the power requirements for trams running on the Hills section meant that no more than two trams were permitted to be in that section at any time and trailers were not to be towed up the hill. The situation was somewhat improved when, in 1920, a new automatic substation was opened in Cashmere (Barrington Street, next to the river) to provide more power to the network for services on the southern lines. Even so, trailers were still not permitted on the Hill section for safety reasons.

Five of the Board's combination trams were fitted with extra brakes for use on the Hills section. Later, ten "Hills" trams were ordered especially for use on the Hills line and also had the extra braking equipment fitted. Eventually there were 13 Hills cars in service. These were the only trams used on this section.

Many of the tramlines were operated as part of a "linked route", that is, a cross-town service between two suburban termini. Cashmere was one of these lines and was initially linked with the St. Albans Park line until 1932-10-2. From 1932-10-3 to 1934-4-15 it was linked with the Dallington line, and then to the Papanui line from 1934-4-16 until it was closed.

The Papanui–Cashmere route was the last tram route in operation in Christchurch. When the Barrington Street–Hills terminus section closed on 1953-4-13 it was replaced with a shuttle bus service, later served by Spreydon buses from 1953-6-21. The last revenue services were run on 1954-9-10 and by the time of the ceremonial running of the last tram the following day, the replacement bus service had already commenced.

As of 2026, the Cashmere extension of the number 1 route (Rangiora/Cashmere) of Environment Canterbury's Metro bus system follows the old Cashmere tram route south of Moorhouse Avenue.

=== Sumner line ===
The Sumner line was built by the Canterbury Tramway Company and opened to its ultimate terminus in 1888. The Christchurch Tramway Board acquired it in 1905 from the Christchurch Tramway Company, successor to the Canterbury Company.

As the line to Sumner was one of the original tramway lines, it was included in the initial contract for construction and electrification of the Board's tramway network. While construction was in progress the Board continued to run steam-hauled services along the old line using rolling stock it acquired when it purchased the private tramway companies assets. This contract also included the construction of a tram-only causeway across McCormack's Bay, primarily to speed up services by providing a more direct route with fewer curves, and the strengthening of a viaduct across Clifton Bay, a wooden structure originally built by the Canterbury Tramway Company.

The McCormack's Bay causeway, originally only wide enough for the tramline, was built using stone from Andrew's Quarry. It had three culverts to permit tidal flow and was designed to resist wave action and to allow for subsidence into the mud. A road was built on the landward side of the causeway in 1936–1937 as part of a work relief scheme. The viaduct was rebuilt twice in the 1920s and had a road built on its landward side in the 1950s. A second causeway was constructed at Clifton Heights and opened in April 1916.

Electric tram services commenced on 1907-4-25 though steam motors were still used occasionally with long rakes of trailers on special occasions. The line was run as a standalone service with trams starting and ending their runs at Cathedral Square. When big events were held at Lancaster Park a large fleet of trams would be used to transport patrons to the venue on Stevens Street from The Square. Afterwards some services headed direct to a suburban terminus while most went straight back to The Square.

The last tram ran on 1952-12-6 at which time the route was changed over to buses amid an appropriate public farewell.

Though the old Sumner tram route between the city centre and Sumner remains in Environment Canterbury's Metro bus system, the No. 3 route number originally assigned for the trams was displaced by a reform of the bus network introduced on 2014-12-08. As of November 2020, the route once again uses its original tram number as its route name, retaining most of the original tram route in Sumner.

=== Cranford Street line ===
The line to Cranford Street from the central city was built by the Tramway Board after the initial tramway construction contract and was opened to electric tram services on 1910-7-1.

One popular destination on the line was English Park at which sporting matches were held.

Cranford Street was one of several "linked routes" whereby trams ran between two suburban termini rather than terminating at Cathedral Square. It was paired with the Spreydon line from 1911/8/3 to 1933-4-2 and then the Lincoln Road line until closure. Coinciding with the commencement of the Cranford Street–Lincoln Road route was the introduction of one-man trams. To facilitate one-man tram operation a turning wye was installed at the terminus of the line and later extended in 1939 to handle the turning of multiple vehicles. The wye on the Cranford Street line was one of only two in the whole network at which regulations permitted trams to be run with the leading trolley pole up while turning the tram.

The last timetabled trams ran, without ceremony, on Sunday 1953-7-26. The replacement bus service commenced the following day.

=== Brighton line ===
The New Brighton line was originally built and operated by the New Brighton Tramway Company until the Tramway Board acquired it in 1905. It was essentially an extension of the City Council's Corporation Line and was opened to its namesake terminus in 1887. The Company also later obtained the right to operate services on the Corporation Line giving it the full route from the central city to Brighton.

By the time the Tramway Board assumed control of the assets of the New Brighton Tramway Company construction of its network was behind schedule due to a shortage of materials. To maintain services on the New Brighton line it hired a private contractor to supply drivers and horses to continue the horse tram service as a temporary measure. It was not until 1906-3-26 that electric services commenced as far as Linwood, and 1906-8-6 before they reached the terminus.

Services to New Brighton, under the Board's control, originally ran down Worcester Street before turning into Linwood Avenue, following the route of the old Corporation line (later New Brighton Tramway Company). From 1910-11-1 they switched to running down Cashel Street to Linwood Avenue, following – in part – the route of the old City and Suburban line. They always started from Cathedral Square, as the Brighton line was never part of any "linked route".

Once it had been decided to replace the Christchurch tramway network with buses the Brighton line was the first to close. The last tram ran on the afternoon of 18 October 1952 with the first bus of the replacement service departing shortly thereafter.

The No. 5 route number disappeared when Environment Canterbury implemented a reform of the Metro bus system on 8 December 2014. In 2020 this change was reversed, and as of 2026 the line is known as the 5 (Rolleston/New Brighton) route.

=== Dallington line ===
The track along Worcester Street was built for the Christchurch City Council's Corporation Line and later used by the Canterbury Tramway Company and the New Brighton Tramway Company as operators of that line. The Tramway Board acquired it in 1906 when it purchased the assets of the private tramway companies.

Under Tramway Board control the line was first used for services along Worcester Street from March 1906 and later, New Brighton trams also shared the line from 1906-8-4. The New Brighton route was switched to Cashel Street from Worcester Street on 1910-11-1 after which the Worcester Street trams terminated at the intersection of Linwood Avenue and Aldwins Road. Two years later the Tramway Board opened an extension of the line to the suburb of Dallington on 1912-11-1. Occasionally when there was a sporting event held at Lancaster Park services on this route would be extended past the railway station to the park.

The Worcester Street/Dallington line was linked to several other lines to form "linked routes" at various times throughout its existence. Until 1932-10-2 it was paired with the Addington line, then the Cashmere Hills line from 1932-10-3 to 1934-4-15, and finally the Christchurch Railway Station line from 1934-4-16 to 1936-11-1. One-man trams were never introduced on this line because it was not possible to install a turning facility for them at the terminus.

Economic constraints in the 1930s compelled the Tramway Board to institute various economy measures including the cessation of tram services on under-performing lines. One of the casualties was the Worcester Street/Dallington line, which was closed and replaced by a bus service on 1936-11-1.

=== Lincoln Road line ===
The Canterbury Tramway Company originally built this line in 1887 and it was later extended by the company's successor, the Christchurch Tramway Company in 1896. The Tramway Board acquired it when it purchased the assets of the Company in 1905.

As a former private tramway line it was included in the initial construction contract and electrified by the New Zealand Electrical Construction Company. Electric tram services commenced on 1906-2-8.

One distinguishing feature of the line was that it was one of only three lines to provide tram connections to railway stations. Tram services to Addington railway station commenced in 1882 with connections to the station continuing under the Board's control from passing electric trams. It was also one of several tramlines in Christchurch to feature a level crossing with a heavy rail line. Other popular or notable destinations on the line included the Addington Showgrounds, Spreydon School, and the Sunnyside Asylum.

Most lines in Christchurch's electrified tram network were operated as "linked routes" whereby a route consisted of two lines with trams passing through The Square. Lincoln Road, originally Addington, was one of these lines and was first linked to the St. Albans Park line from 1932-10-3 to 1933-4-2, then became part of the Cranford Street–Lincoln Road route until closure. Coinciding with this line's linking to the Cranford Street line was the introduction of one-man trams on this new route as an economy measure. To facilitate the operation of one-man trams, a turning wye was constructed at the terminus of the line.

The Lincoln Road tram service ended, without ceremony, on Sunday 1953-7-26. A replacement bus service commenced the following day.

The No. 7 route number, originally assigned to this tram line, was retired by a reform of the Metro bus system introduced on 8 December 2014. The replacement was the "Orange" line that runs an extended route between Halswell and Queenspark. Much like the No. 5 route, this change was reversed in 2020, and as of 2026 the route is once again known as the 7 (Halswell/Queenspark) line.

=== Riccarton line ===
The line to Riccarton was included in the initial construction contract and built by the New Zealand Electrical Construction Company. It was ready for the commencement of steam-hauled services on 1905-11-2 and fully electrified from 1906-3-12.

In an effort to give the line a major destination, the Board terminated the line at the Riccarton Racecourse, then a popular attraction for entertainment and discretionary travel. The terminus featured several sidings in the racecourse grounds to accommodate a large number of trams for major events, a tramcar shed, and in 1921 a shingle pit was purchased off Main South Road in Sockburn from which it was able to source construction materials. Also along the line was one of the network's several level crossings with a heavy railway line.

An extension of this line was completed in December 1915 to Plumpton Park (now Wigram Aerodrome). Trams were operating on this extension by the following month.

The Board's services to the Riccarton Racecourse were one of two instances in Christchurch where all the trams operated in direct competition to the Railways Department. The Department, which ran its own trains on the Racecourse's siding from Sockburn railway station, also provided passenger services to the Racecourse for major events. Although the siding outlasted the tramline to the Racecourse by 18 months it was generally the trams that were the more popular with passengers.

One-man trams were introduced on the Riccarton line as an economy measure on 1935-1-14. This also included the intermediate destination of Clyde Road, the only such destination in the network to feature one-man tram operation. To facilitate the operation of one-man trams to Clyde Road, a balloon loop was installed at that location.

The last timetabled tram ran on the Riccarton line, without ceremony, on Sunday 1953-6-14. The replacement bus service commenced the following day.

=== Fendalton line ===
The Tramway Board built the line to Fendalton from the central city after the initial tramway construction contract. Services were at first steam-hauled from 1907-5-3, later being opened to electric trams from 1909-11-20.

In the 1920s several new lines were proposed but never actually built. One of the proposals was for a line to Bryndwr from the Papanui line to terminate on Wairarapa Terrace. As an alternative a link from that line to the Fendalton line down Rossall Street was also proposed.

Power supply to the network was improved for northwest routes in 1922 when a new substation was commissioned in Fendalton. It was supplied with electricity by the State hydropower scheme and automatically boosted power to the overhead supply system as demand dictated.

Beset by economic problems in the 1930s, the Tramway Board experimented with, and ultimately introduced on several routes, one-man trams. One of the routes they had hoped to convert to one-man operation was Fendalton–Opawa for which they allocated money for the construction of turning facilities at both termini. The Board's 1935 proposal was emphatically opposed by both the local council and residents, partly because Clyde Road was considered to be too narrow for the turning wye the Board wanted to build, even after the Board offered to widen Clyde Road at its own expense. The whole idea was finally rejected at a public meeting on 1935-7-25 forcing the Board to continue to use Boon trams on the route.

Fendalton was linked to the Opawa line in a Fendalton–Opawa route from the time the latter line opened until both lines were closed on 1950-2-5. The replacement bus service commenced the following day.

=== North Beach line ===
The Tramway Board acquired the North Beach line in November 1906 when it purchased the assets of the City and Suburban Tramway Company. The Board was hesitant to use it suspecting that due to its nature it would be difficult for the line to pay its own way. Nevertheless, it provided a horse-drawn service on the central city to Richmond section of the line from later that year and left the remainder fallow.

Following requests from people living along the route the line was electrified from the central city to Burwood church with services commencing in August 1910. The remainder of the line was served by horse-drawn coaches, upgraded to a steam-hauled tram service from November as far as the beach, and about a year later to the New Brighton Pier. Public pressure resulted in the line being fully electrified by September 1914.

The track deteriorated to such an extent that trams were terminated at Burwood Church from 1927-8-22. A replacement service operated whereby Brighton trams ran north to North Beach with the distance between there and the church being covered by buses. Those affected by these changes considered them inadequate and strongly prevailed upon the Board to reconsider. The Board heeded their concerns and reopened the line on 1928-10-1.

The problems with the track only got worse and by the 1930s were considered to be dangerous. Renewal of the track could not be justified thus compelling the Board to cease operating trams on this route. Trolley buses were introduced to North Beach from 1931-7-5 and on the Richmond, Marshland Road run from 1934-12-17.

=== St. Martins line ===
The line to St. Martins from the central city was built by the Tramway Board after the initial tramway construction contract and was opened to electric trams on 1914-4-7. It was the last new line to be opened in the Christchurch network.

The Tramway Board experimented with the idea of one-man trams as an economy measure in the late 1920s. They chose the lightly patronised St. Martins line to test the concept and converted three Standard Boon trailers for one-man operation that subsequently became known as St. Martins cars. These trams, introduced into service from 1927, were not favourably received and were later withdrawn, but did prove that the concept could work. Further conversions were done on other tram vehicles and one-man operation subsequently introduced on other lines. Two-man trams were reintroduced to the St. Martins line from 1938-7-11.

The poor state of the track on the St. Martins line forced its closure on 1941-1-5 as wartime restrictions meant that it could not be repaired and a replacement bus service was introduced. The track was not immediately removed and this proved to be the line's "saviour" when Government wartime regulations required the Board to reduce its use of buses. The St. Martins line was granted a reprieve on 1942-7-6 and pressed back into service even though the problems with the track had not been fixed.

After the war ended the St. Martins line was the first to be closed, ceasing tram operations on 1946-5-19. The replacement bus service commenced the following day.

=== Opawa line ===
The Tramway Board built the line to Opawa from the central city after the initial tramway construction contract. Services were at first steam-hauled from 1907-3-14, later being opened to electric trams from 1909-9-21.

The Opawa line was one of several "linked routes" in the Christchurch network, being paired with the Fendalton line for its entire existence. Consequently, when the Board's attempt to introduce one-man tram operation to the Fendalton–Opawa route failed due to opposition from the local council and residents in Fendalton, the Opawa line was also denied this change.

The last trams ran the Fendalton–Opawa route on 1950-2-5 with the replacement bus service commencing the following day.

=== Spreydon line ===
The Tramway Board built the line to Spreydon from the central city after the initial tramway construction contract and the first section was opened to electric trams from 1911-8-3.

The Spreydon line was initially a stand-alone route, terminating at Cathedral Square. From 1933-4-3 it was paired with the St. Albans Park line as a "linked route" until closure.

The last extension in the Christchurch tramway network was that of the Spreydon line to Barrington Street, which opened in August 1922. A balloon loop was added at the new terminus in 1933 after the introduction of one-man tram operation on 3 April of that year, coinciding with the creation of the St. Albans Park–Spreydon route.

The last trams ran, without ceremony, on Sunday 1953-6-21 with the replacement bus service commencing the following day.

As of 2012, the No. 20 route (Burnside/Barrington) of Environment Canterbury's Metro bus system followed the old Spreydon tram route. This has since been superseded by route 120 (Burnside/Barrington), with minor route deviations from the original tram route.

=== Railway line ===
The Tramway Board acquired a line between The Square and Christchurch Railway Station via Colombo Street in 1905 when it purchased the assets of the Christchurch Tramway Company. This Company had many years earlier lifted another line running the same route but via Manchester Street. The Manchester Street line was reinstated by the Board and opened on 1905-6-6 while the Colombo Street route didn't open until a month later on 1905-7-4. Though the Manchester Street line was part of the route for the opening day procession it was not used for revenue services until 1905-12-15 as the track had to be rehabilitated to make it safe for tram operation. Once both lines became available it was standard practice for Railway Station services to run south from The Square along High and Manchester Streets then to return to The Square along Colombo Street.

Services to Christchurch Railway Station were operated as a "linked route" whereby trams ran through Cathedral Square between two suburban termini. Initially the line operated as a Papanui–Christchurch Railway Station service effectively competing with the Railways Department for patronage between those two stations. Following the cessation of tram services to Papanui railway station in 1934 the line became part of the Dallington–Christchurch Railway Station route from 1934-4-16.

Timetabled services to the railway station via Manchester Street ceased on 1932-4-6 and were not immediately replaced. Trams from Dallington continued to run to the railway station via Colombo Street until economic conditions compelled the Board to close under-performing lines which included the Dallington–Christchurch Railway Station route on 1936-11-1. A replacement bus service on the route commenced on 1936-11-2 but ran via Manchester Street instead of Colombo Street. An irregular tram service to the railway station was still provided by trams travelling to and from the Falsgrave Street car shed, particularly around peak hours.

=== St. Albans Park line ===
The St. Albans Park line from the central city was built by the Tramway Board after the initial tramway construction contract and was opened to electric tram services on 1906-12-24 as far as Edgeware Road. It was not until 1915-7-19 that the line was opened to its namesake terminus.

In the 1920s several new routes were proposed, one of which was to link the St. Albans Park line from its terminus to the North Beach route at Marshland Road. This line was never built.

Many lines in the Christchurch tramway network were operated as "linked routes" with other lines. St. Albans Park was one such line and was linked with several other lines throughout its existence. First, it was paired with the Cashmere Hills line until 1932-10-2, then briefly with the Addington line from 1932-10-3 to 1933-4-2, and finally with the Spreydon line until closure. Coinciding with the creation of the St. Albans Park–Spreydon route was the introduction of one-man trams on this run. This necessitated the construction of a wye at the St. Albans Park terminus.

Following the decision to terminate the tramway in Christchurch in the early 1950s, the remaining lines were closed as replacement buses became available. The St. Albans Park–Spreydon route closed, without ceremony, on Sunday 1953-6-21. Bus services commenced the following day.

=== Exhibition loop line ===
An international exhibition was held in Christchurch between November 1906 and March 1907. The exhibition, a showcase for New Zealand's progress and prosperity, received close to 2 million visitors over the 5½ months it was open. Christchurch was chosen in part because its recently electrified tramways would be an efficient way to transport visitors.

The exhibition venue was in North Hagley Park, a location considered ideal because of the available open space for the exhibition buildings and its proximity to transport links. For the duration of the exhibition both the Railways Department and the Tramway Board ran temporary lines to the exhibition venue.

The organisers of the exhibition approached the Board in December 1905 with a proposal to lay a line to the park to which the Board agreed. The Government paid for the installation of an electrified loop line on the understanding that the Board would buy back the materials at the conclusion of the exhibition.

Special fares were issued for passengers riding the trams from the railway station or any point in between to the exhibition of which half was remitted to the exhibition organisers. Around half a million of these tickets were sold, a venture that proved to be quite lucrative for the Board.

The loop line was closed on 1907-4-16 and lifted later that month.

=== Proposed lines ===
The Tramway Board proposed several new lines in the 1920's, but owing to economic difficulties at the same time all these lines were never built. By the time economic conditions had improved the cost of building these lines had increased to unjustifiable levels and in some cases buses were found to be a more cost-effective solution.

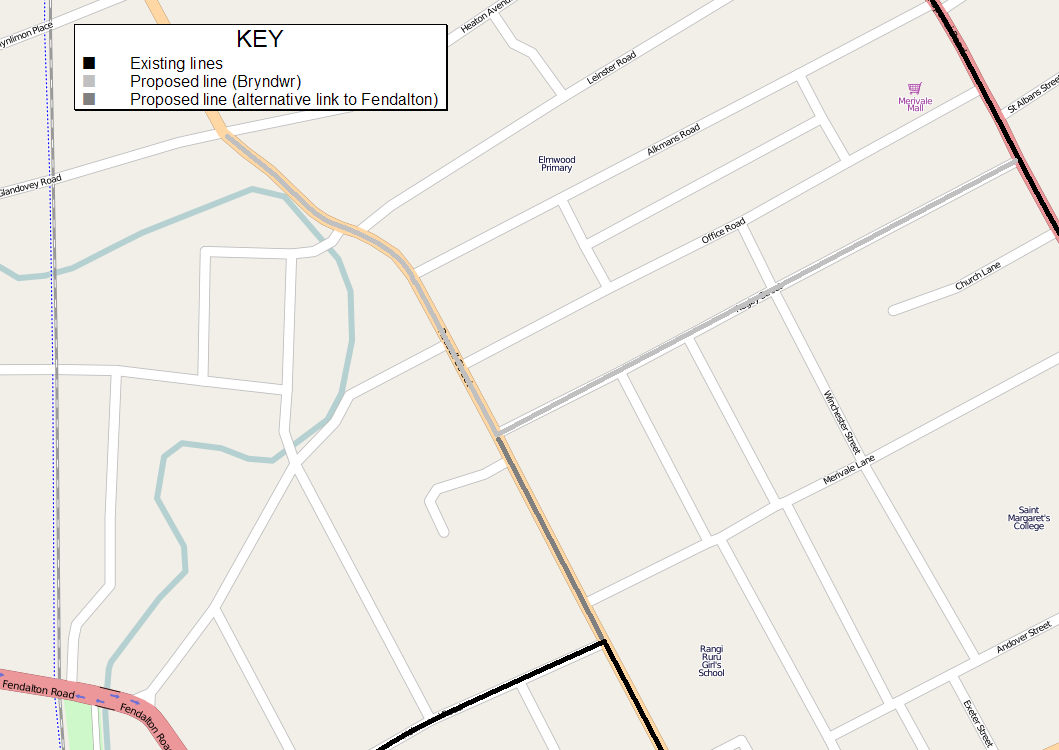
Bryndwr: A new line to serve the suburb of Bryndwr running from the Papanui line along Rugby Street, Rossall Street and Wairarapa Terrace to the intersection of Glandovey Road and Strowan Road.

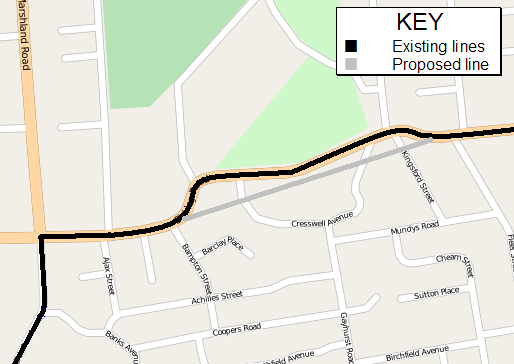
Buxton's short cut: A direct line through Burwood Park.

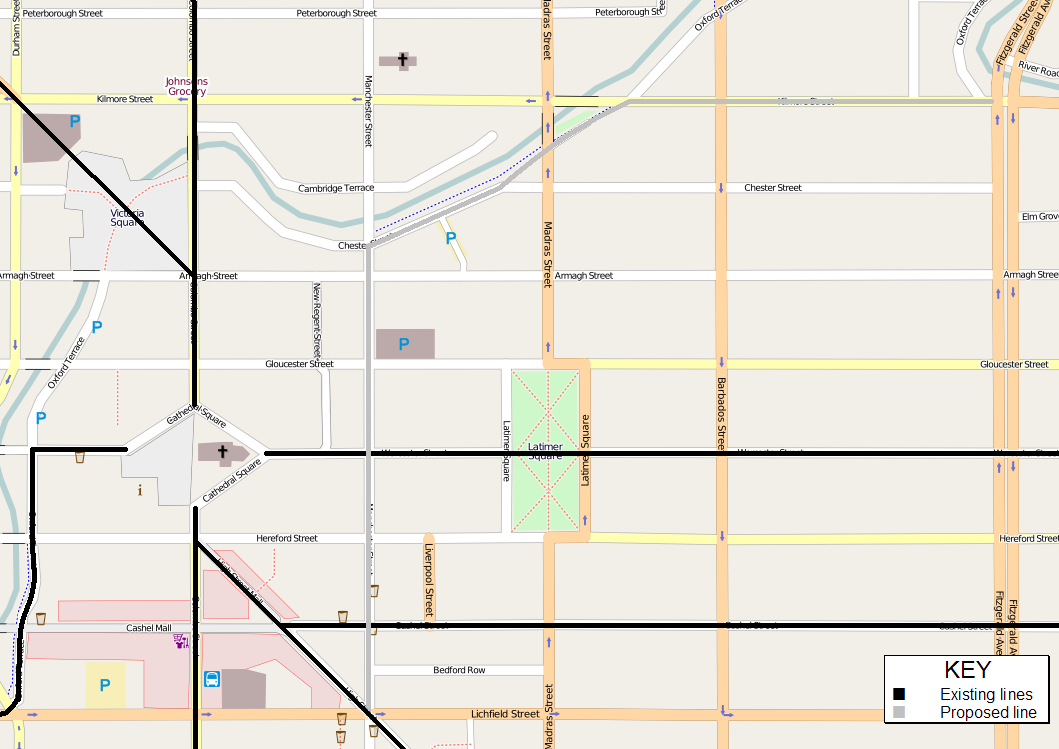
North-east city routes: A line running north along Manchester Street from High Street then turning into Oxford Terrace and Kilmore Street to terminate at Fitzgerald Avenue.

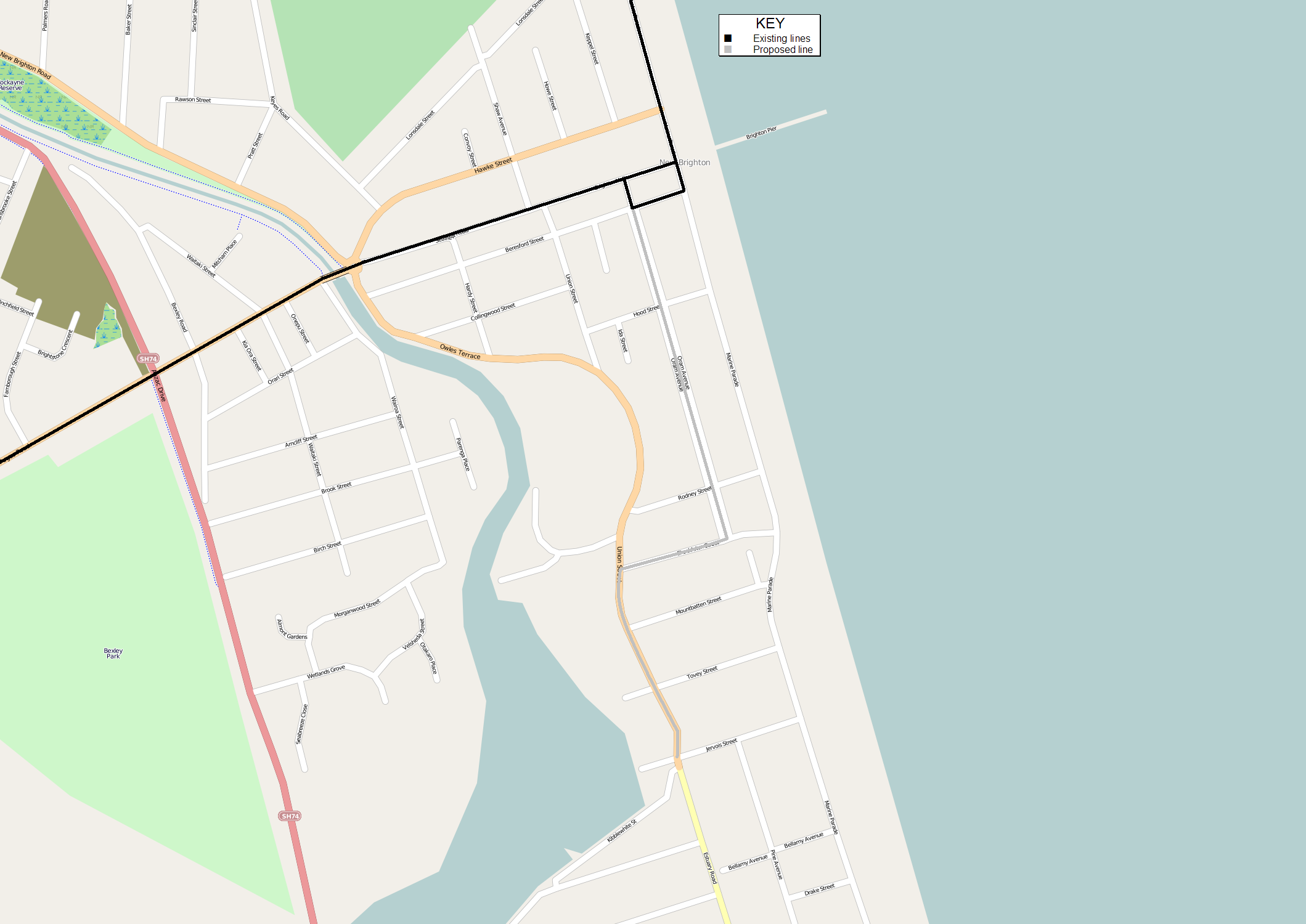
South Brighton extension: An extension of the New Brighton line along the full length of Oram Avenue then turning into Shackleton Street and Union Street to terminate at the intersection of Jervois Street and Estuary Road.

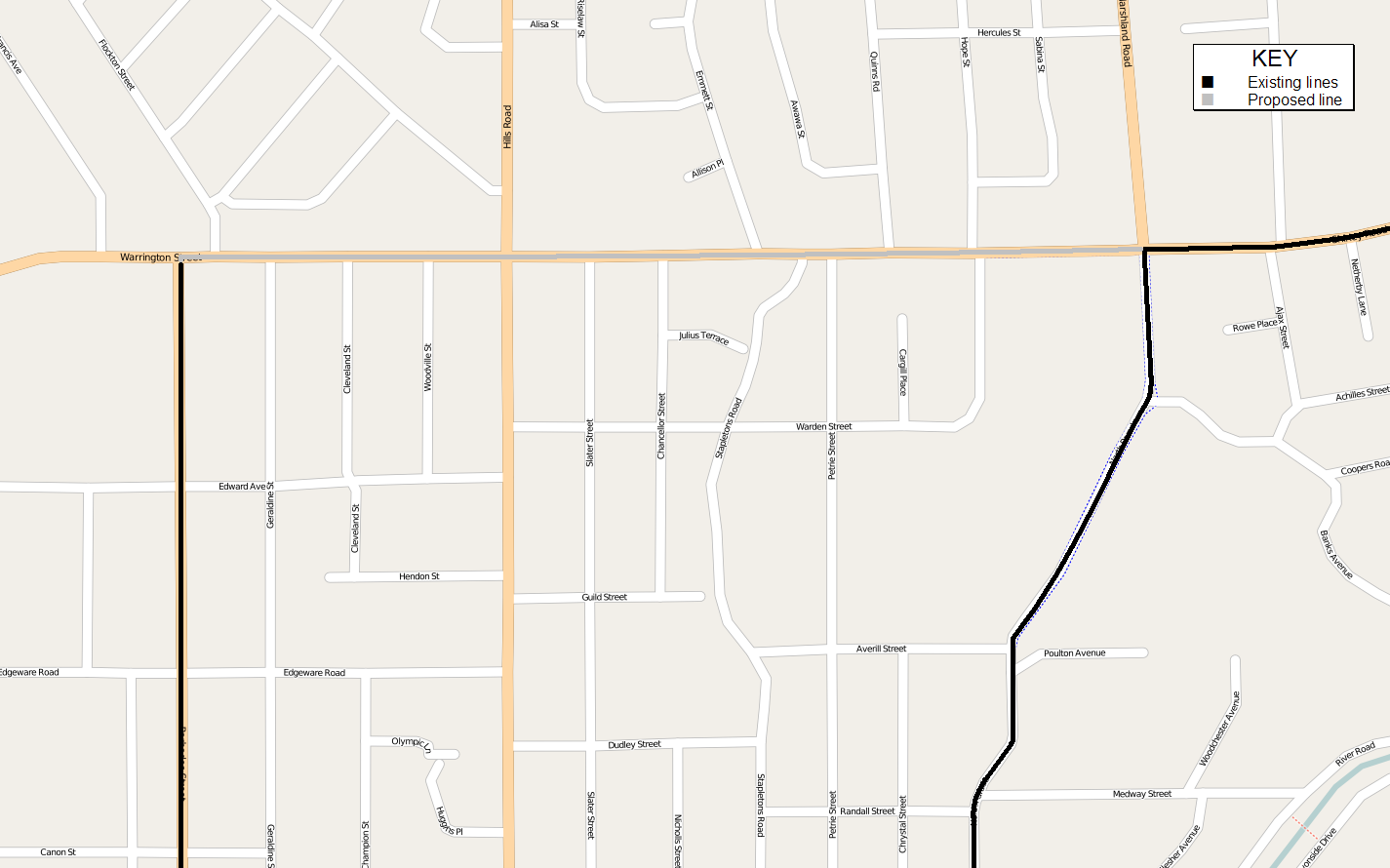
St. Albans Park–Marshland link: A line along Warrington Street and Shirley Road between Barbadoes Street and North Parade/Marshland Road.

=== Destinations ===
Destination signage on trams went through several different designs before the roll-blind (below) was settled on in 1921. The route number was displayed on the front of the tram and the name of the destination at the side.

1L	LICHFIELD ST
1L	LEINSTER RD
1P	PAPANUI
1X	PAPANUI EXP
1	PAPANUI RLY
1	NORTHCOTE RD
2T	TENNYSON ST
2B	BARR'TON ST
2O	HILLS SCHOOL
2	HILLS TERMINUS
2X	HILLS EXP
3S	SMITH ST
3W	WOOLSTON
3	SUMNER
3X	SUMNER EXP
4	CRANFORD ST
5C	CASHEL ST
5	BREEZES RD
5	BRIGHTON
5X	BRIGHTON EXP
5S	SOUTH BRIGHTON
6W	WORCESTER ST
6	DALLINGTON
6	CEMETERY
7	JERROLD ST
7	LINCOLN RD
8C	CLYDE RD
8	RICCARTON
8X	RICCARTON EXP
9	FENDALTON
10T	RICHMOND
10M	MARSHLAND RD
10B	BURWOOD
10	NORTH BEACH
10X	N. BCH EXP
12	ST. MARTINS
13	OPAWA
14C	CORONATION ST
14	SPREYDON
15	CHCH. RLY
16	ST ALBANS PARK
17	BRYNDWR
	KILMORE ST. E.
SPECIAL	SPECIAL
SHED	CAR SHED
SPORTS	LANCASTER PARK
SHOW	SHOW GD
SPORTS	CRICKET GD
RACES	RACECOURSE
SQ	SQUARE
TROTS	RACECOURSE

The addition of a letter after the route number indicated what was known as a "short working". Route 11 was not used to avoid confusion with route 1.

Routes to South Brighton, Bryndwr, and Kilmore Street East were proposed but never built.

== Preservation era: 1968–present ==
The first section of the Ferrymead Tramway to open, on 6 January 1968, ran from the tram shed at Bridle Path Road to the edge of the Ferrymead Reserve. Later extensions opened across the reserve (11 December 1971), to the paddock loop (23 March 1974), to Truscotts Road (1 August 1976), and the completion of the township line and loop (17 September 1984). Services currently only run between the Bridle Path Road tram barn and the township loop at Truscotts Road. The line from the tram barn to the end of the reserve is very rarely used these days because of a dispute with the Park's neighbour. The line incorporates two passing loops (at the tram barn and the end of the reserve line), a turning wye (at the tram barn), a balloon loop (at the township), double-track from the Church Corner to the balloon loop, and two sidings (to the Hall of Wheels and a disused siding to a planned but never built town car shed). All tracks, in keeping with the original Christchurch tramway network, are standard gauge.

Another milestone achieved by the Tramway Historical Society was the inauguration of electrification on its tramway on 9 May 1970. Since then electrification has been progressively extended along all of the Society's tramlines including the disused reserve line. There are presently two tram barns at the Bridle Path Road site in addition to the Society's trolley bus barn at the Truscotts Road end of the park.

== Modern era: 1995–present ==
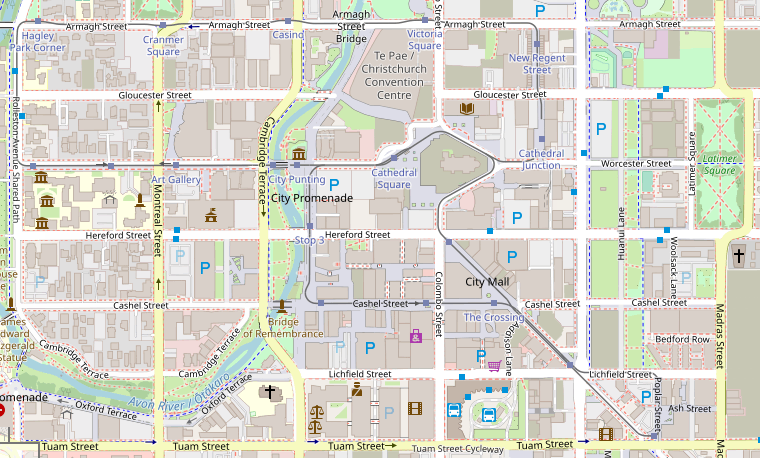

Trams made a return to central Christchurch following a decision made by the Christchurch City Council in November 1990 to include them as part of its Worcester Boulevard project. Construction commenced in 1991, initially with the intention of building a line between Rolleston Avenue and Cathedral Square, but later plans extended this into a loop around the central city. Other suggested extensions, such as into Hagley Park and the Botanic Gardens, were not included.

The circuit opened for business on 4 February 1995 using a fleet of historic vehicles leased from the Tramway Historical Society. The tramway was initially run by Christchurch Tramway Ltd. but it was purchased in 2005 and is now run by Woodland Scenic Line Ltd. Since opening, the service has acquired its own historic trams in addition to its vehicles on loan from the THS, such as two Melbourne W2 trams, one of which has been fitted out as a restaurant.

As with the original electric tramway in Christchurch, its modern counterpart also runs on 1,435 mm (4 ft 8 1/2 in) standard gauge track using vehicles supplied, via a trolley system, with 600 V DC power from an overhead catenary.

The tramway has a barn on Tramway Lane near Cathedral Square where its vehicles are stabled. Trams travel in a clockwise direction starting from Cathedral Junction, run along Worcester Street around the north side of the Cathedral to Park Terrace, up to Armagh Street, along to New Regent Street, and back to The Junction.

In 2008, an extension was proposed, with a second loop incorporating the Oxford Terrace "strip" and the City Mall on Cashel Street. This was under construction at the same time of the 2010 Canterbury earthquake and subsequent February 2011 Christchurch earthquake, as a result of which work was delayed. Part of the second loop, along Oxford Terrace, Cashel Mall and part of Main Street was officially opened on 12 February 2015.

== See also ==
- Christchurch tramway system
- Public transport in Christchurch for up-to-date bus route information
