= BUT RETB/1 =

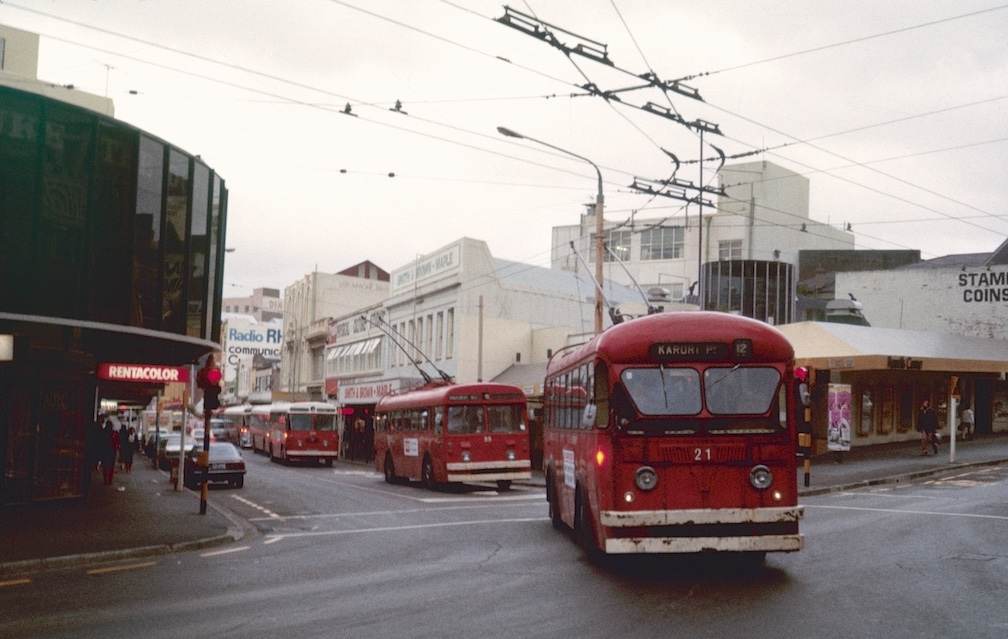
- Two BUT RETB/1 trolleybuses of the Wellington trolleybus system in 1981

Overview
- Manufacturer: British United Traction
- Production: 1950 - 1964

Body and chassis
- Doors: 1

The BUT RETB/1 was a two-axle single-deck trolleybus chassis manufactured by British United Traction between 1950 and 1964. Glasgow purchased one in 1950, followed by two batches of 10 in 1952 and 1958. 18 units were bought for Montevideo, Uruguay for the first trolleybus lines of the municipal operator AMDET, these trolleybuses were finally scrapped in 1976 with the dissolution of AMDET.

These buses ran on two New Zealand networks. Wellington purchased 109, the last 38 being assembled by Scammell's Watford plant in 1964. Dunedin initially ordered 31, its fleet growing to 79.

Both trolleybus networks in Tasmania used this vehicle: Hobart ordered 38 and Launceston ordered 30.

Copenhagen placed an order for four in 1949.
