= Castle Rock =

Castle Rock may refer to:

== Geography ==
=== Islands ===
- Castle Rock (Alaska), an island off the coast of the U.S. state of Alaska
- Castle Rock, Hong Kong, an island of Hong Kong, part of the Po Toi Islands
- Castle Rock (Massachusetts), an island in the U.S. state of Massachusetts

=== Mountains and rock outcroppings ===
- Castle Rock (Alaskan mountain), Denali Borough in Alaska
- Castle Rock (Antarctica), near McMurdo Station, Antarctica
- Castle Rock (South Shetland Islands), Antarctica
- Castle Rock, Western Australia, in the Porongurup Range, Australia
- Castle Rock (volcano), a volcanic plug in British Columbia, Canada
- Castle Rock (Waikato), a volcanic plug on the Coromandel Peninsula, New Zealand
- Te Tihi-o-Kahukura / Castle Rock, a rock outcrop in the Port Hills
- Castle Rock (Edinburgh), the site of Edinburgh Castle, Scotland, UK
- Castle Rock (Table Mountain), a rock formation of the Table Mountain massif
- Castle Rock of Triermain, a crag on Watson's Dodd in the English Lake District, UK

==== United States ====
- Castle Rock Butte, a summit in South Dakota
- Castle Rock (Chelan County), a mountain summit in Washington
- Castle Rock (Colorado), a butte near the city of Castle Rock
- Castle Rock (Kansas), near the town of Quinter in northwestern Kansas
- Castle Rock (Michigan), a tourist attraction with steps for climbing north of St. Ignace
- Castle Rock (New York), an elevation located in Hamilton County
- Castle Rock (San Juan County, Utah), a butte at Monument Valley
- Castle Rock (Kane County, Utah), a landmark at Lake Powell
- Castle Rock, also known as Castleton Tower, adjacent to Castle Valley
- Caudy's Castle ("Castle Rock"), a sandstone outcrop in Hampshire County, West Virginia
- Castle Rock (Pineville, West Virginia)

=== Parks ===
- Castle Rock Hoodoos Provincial Park, near Kamloops, British Columbia, Canada
- Castle Rock National Wildlife Refuge, near Crescent City, California
- Castle Rock Park, near Walnut Creek, California
- Castle Rock State Park (California), near Saratoga, California
- Castle Rock State Park (Illinois)

=== Settlements ===
- Castle Rock, British Columbia, Canada
- Castle Rock, Karnataka, India
  - Castle Rock railway station, Karnataka
- Castlerock, Northern Ireland
  - Castlerock railway station

==== United States ====
- Castle Rock, Colorado
- Castle Rock, Missouri
- Castle Rock, Oregon (disambiguation)
- Castle Rock, South Dakota
- Castle Rock, Utah, ghost town
- Castle Rock, Washington
- Castle Rock, Wisconsin, town
- Castle Rock (community), Wisconsin
- Castle Rock Township, Dakota County, Minnesota

=== Other locations ===
- Castle Rock (Garrison, New York), a historic house in the Hudson Highlands
- Castlerock railway station, a railway station in County Londonderry, Northern Ireland

== Fiction ==
- Castle Rock (Stephen King), the fictional Maine town in many Stephen King works
- Castle Rock (TV series), the American television series based on Stephen King's fictional town
- Castle Rock, the mountain in William Golding's 1954 novel Lord of the Flies; inspiration for Stephen King's later use

== Music ==
- "Castle Rock", a 1951 song recorded by Frank Sinatra and Harry James
- "Cut Some Rug" / "Castle Rock", a 1996 double A-side single by British band The Bluetones
- Castle Rock (album), a 1955 album by American jazz saxophonist Johnny Hodges
- "Castle Rock" a song in the 2013 game Rayman Legends which is a parody of the popular song Black Betty by Ram Jam.

== Other ==
- Castle Rock Brewery, a microbrewery located in Nottingham, England
- Castle Rock Entertainment, a film production company founded by Rob Reiner and named after Stephen King's fictional town
- Castle Rock Estate, an Australian winery based at Porongurup
- Castle Rock Foundation, an American conservative foundation
- The Castle Rock School, an English school located in Coalville
- Town of Castle Rock v. Gonzales, a 2005 United States Supreme Court decision
- Castle Rock Winery, an American winery based in California
- USS Castle Rock (AVP-35), a United States Navy seaplane tender in commission from 1944 to 1946
