= Rock climbing in New Zealand =

Rock Climbing
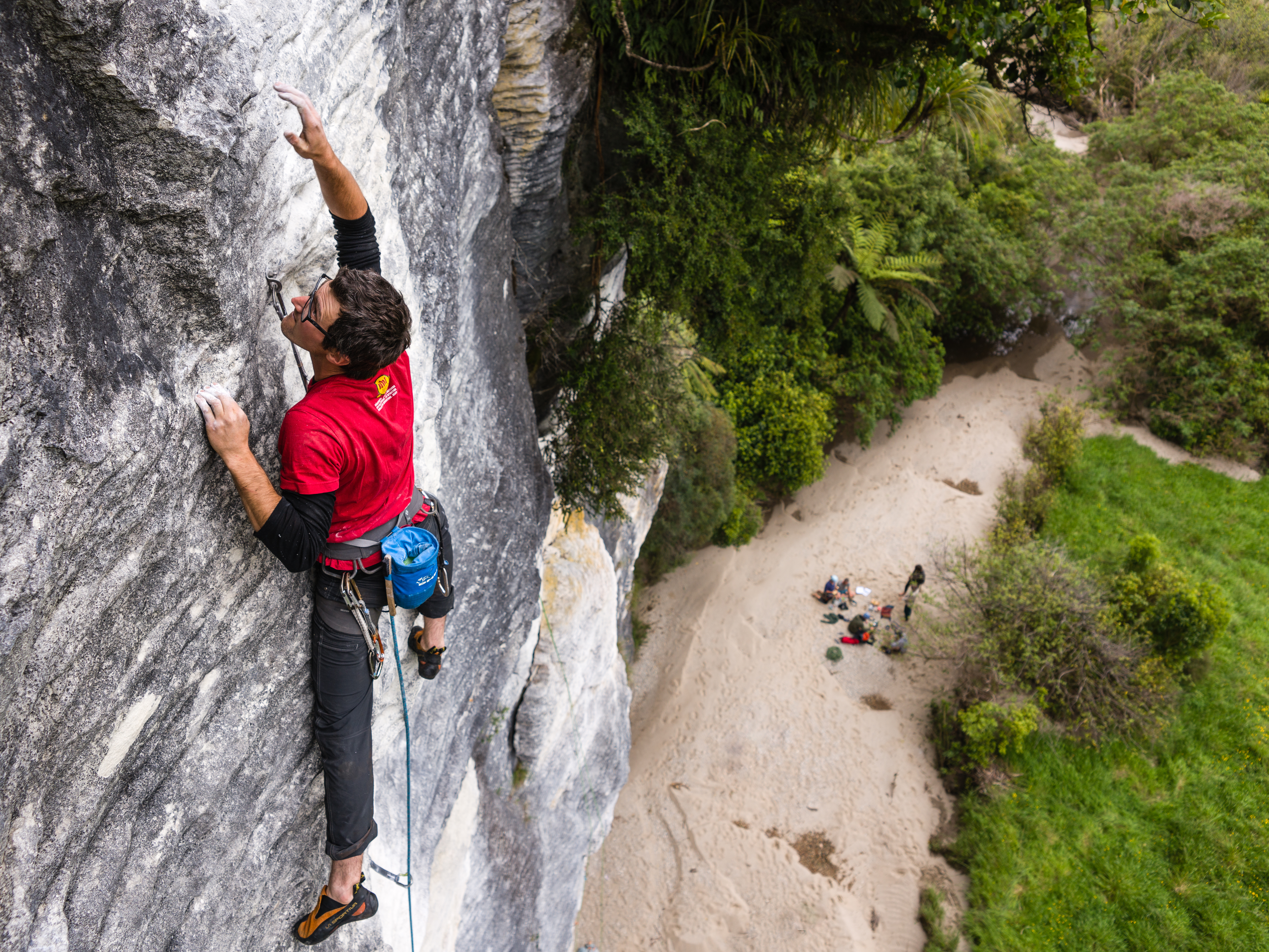
- Rock climbing in New Zealand
- Highest governing body: www.climbing.nz

Rock climbing in New Zealand, as a sport in its own right, emerged in the late 1960s and early 1970s. While it has been practiced at least since the late 1800s it was largely considered as training for mountaineering. By 1968, however the first dedicated rock climbing guide had been published by the University of Canterbury tramping club, and the following decade saw a rapid improvement in standards and the introduction of new technologies and approaches including the bolting of routes that paved the way for sport climbing to emerge as an alternative to traditional route protection. Pursuit of trad climbing, sport climbing and bouldering all began developing their distinct trajectories separate from each other and from mountaineering.

== Access ==
Rock climbing in New Zealand is pursued in many settings: sea cliffs (e.g. Ti Point, Long Beach), lakeside cliffs (e.g. Kawakawa Bay and Whanganui Bay on Lake Taupō), riverside cliffs (e.g. Waipapa Dam), old quarries (e.g. Mt Eden Quarry), farmland crags (e.g. Wharepapa Rock, Waipari), and alpine crags (e.g. Wye Creek in The Remarkables). Access rights to these climbing areas vary across the country due to the circumstances of land ownership and governance. Sustainable access to rock climbing areas in New Zealand has become an increasingly important issue and in recent years a number of historically important climbing areas, such as Mt Eden Quarry and Whanganui Bay have become closed to the climbing community. In response to these difficulties the Aotearoa Climbing Access Trust was formed to engage with landowners and public land governance bodies to maintain sustainable access to rock climbing areas in New Zealand.

== Major climbing areas ==
Detailed descriptions of climbing areas and climbing routes in New Zealand can be found on specialist websites including climbnz.org.nz, 8a.nu and thecrag.com.

The table below details those areas that have been most popular over the years, although some are closed.

Major rock climbing areas in NZ
Area	Style	Rock type	Number of routes	Ownership and status
North Island
Mt Eden Quarry	Trad	Basalt	>200	Private and closed
Wharepapa South	Sport	Ignimbrite	>1,300	Mostly on private property except Waipapa
The Airstrip, Waitomo	Bouldering	Limestone	>200	Private property
Whanganui Bay	Sport and Trad	Ignimbrite	>300	Public and closed
Kinloch/Kawakawa Bay	Sport	Rhyolite	>300	Public land
South Island
Paines Ford / Pohara, Golden Bay	Sport	Limestone	>300	Public land
Castle Hill Basin	Bouldering	Limestone	>2,500	Public and private
Port Hills	Sport	Trachyte and Basalt	>1,100	Public and private
Wānaka	Sport	Schist	>1,000	Mostly public
Queenstown	Sport	Schist	>1,000	Mostly public
Long Beach, Dunedin	Sport	Andesite	>200	Public land

== Competition climbing ==
Competition climbing in New Zealand is administered by Climbing New Zealand, a member of Sport New Zealand.

== History ==
Although rock climbing in New Zealand has a post-colonial history that can be traced back at least to the 1890s, it was primarily employed as training for mountaineering.

It was not until the 1970s that a community of dedicated rock climbers emerged focused primarily on rock climbing to push the sport into the modern era. The key protagonists advancing rock climbing standards in the 1970s included Robbie McBirney and Rick Mcgregor in Auckland and John Allen, John Howard and Dave Fearnley in Christchurch. Robbie McBirney and Rick Mcgregor contributed many first ascents in the Mt Eden Quarry, including Robbie McBirney's ascent of Supergroove in 1976. Although McBirney initially graded Supergroove at 24, it was soon recognised as the first 26 to be established in Oceania.

Although rock climbing standards were greatly elevated in the 1970s, largely driven by members of the Auckland Rock Group, it was the 1980s the has been called the "revolutionary epoch" of New Zealand Climbing. It was the decade when bolting became ubiquitous, opening up many of the rock faces in New Zealand that had previously been unprotectable by traditional gear placements. In the North island the focus of activity was at Whanganui Bay with many climbers making significant contributions, including: Len Gillman, Graeme Aimer, Grant Davison, Bryce Martin, Simon Vallings, Robbie McBirney, Rick McGregor, Roland Foster and Micke Rockell.

The 1990s saw the proliferation of indoor climbing walls and the rapid development of Paynes Ford, arguably New Zealand finest sport climbing crag.

== Timeline ==
=== 1890s ===
- 1893: A summit of Paritutu from the seaward side by Malcolm Ross was the first post-colonial record of a rock climbing ascent in New Zealand.

=== 1900s ===
- 1903: First recorded female ascent of seaward side of Paritutu Rock.

=== 1910s ===
- 1913: "Edgar Williams made the presumed first ascent, solo, of Hellfire Gully"

=== 1920s ===
- 1924: repeat of Pinnacles Traverse in the footsteps of Horace Holl
- 1927: Horace Holl, an early post-colonial rock climbing enthusiast dies while trying to cross a flooded river.

=== 1930s ===
- 1930: A.D. Jeffrey gives a lecture on rock climbing to the Mountain Craft Guild in Auckland
- 1931: D.W.O. Hall writes an article in the Press in which he declares "I am a rock climber by predilection" and in which he describes the distinctive nature of the rock climbing specialist.
- 1931: G.L.N. describes rock climbing routes at Pencarrow Head in Wellington
- 1934: Members of Christchurch tramping clubs practice rock climbing in the Port Hills

=== 1950s ===
- 1957: Ascent of "The Nose" (Ewbank grade:15) of Humphries Castle on the slopes of Mount Taranaki by Vic S. Rhodes and Doug Ball
- 1957: "Climbing School" at Te Tihi-o-Kahukura / Castle Rock, organised by the Canterbury Mountaineering Club.

=== 1960s ===
- October 1960: local tramping club members Dick Corin and Jim Finch make a trip to Baring Head, establishing one of NZ's first bouldering locations
- 1968: The Canterbury University Tramping Club publishes "Guide to the Port Hills/Castle Rock and Rapaki Rock : history, geology, rockclimbing, plants" (edited by Don Hutton), NZ's first rock climbing guide, covering routes at Te Tihi-o-Kahukura / Castle Rock and Rapaki Rock in the Port Hills.

=== 1970s ===
- 1970: Rigid Digit (19) established by Graeme Dingle at Tītahi Bay.
- 1970: Graeme Dingle publishes the North island's first rock climbing guidebook, complete with topographic maps and grades.
- 1971: Tibia (16) was climbed by Graeme Dingle, Mike Gill and Eric McMahon, establishing the first route at Whanganui Bay, a venue that became central to development of rock climbing in the North Island in the 1970s and 1980s.
- 1972: Cliff Smith established the Auckland Rock Group (A.R.G.), with members soon including Robbie McBirney, Rick McGregor, Peter Giles and Bryce Martin.
- May 1973: First free routes were erstablished on the Long Side at Mt Eden Quarry by Robbie McBirney and Rick McGregor.
- November 1976: Robbie McBirney establishes Supergroove (26) at Mt Eden Quarry, originally graded 24, but soon after recognised as Oceania's first grade 26.
- 1979: John Allen established Nether Edge (21) in the Castle Hill Basin, and the first use of bolts in the area.

=== 1980s ===
- 1981: Charlie Creese climbs "A Show of Strength" (V8) on The Lean To Boulder at Baring Head. This climb went unrepeated for more than a decade and was a world-class performance at the time.
- 1981: Charlie Creese establishes "Blam, Blam, Blam" at Mt Eden Quarry. Originally graded 28. At the time there were few climbs harder than this in the world. For example, the first French 8a climbs were not established until the following year in 1982. Charlie Creese's time at the forefront of NZ climbing was brief, but his impact and achievements - relative to international standards - remain unsurpassed.
- 1981: Rick Mcgregor publishes Ignimbrite Climbs, covering all developed Ignimbrite crags north of Tūrangi.
- 1982: Len Gillman published the first edition of Whanganui Rock.
- 1983: Grant Davidson published "Poor Man's Guide to North island Crags", the first of a series of guides that were reputedly much sought after.
- 1987: Doug Carson and Murray Judge established the New Zealand sport climbing federation.
- 1987: New Zealand's first rock climbing competition was held on the limestone crags of Duntroon.

=== 1990s ===
- 1990: an outdoor climbing competition was held at Motuoapa and attended by climbers from all over the North Island.
- 1991: Peter Garlick publishes first climbing guide to Paynes Ford in NZ Adventure magazine
- 1991: Eric Talamadge climbs "Angel of Pain" (31) at Castle Hill's Dark Castle.
- 1992: Roland Foster establishes Zorn's Lemma (29/8a) at Mt Eden Quarry.
- 1993: Roland Foster establishes Zillmerized (29/30) at Mt Eden Quarry.
- 1994: Matt Evrard established the original Space Boy (32) line at Barnett Park.
- 1995: Kaz Pucia extend Evrard's Space Boy (32).
- 1997: Colin Pohl establishes Tiger-Style (29/8a) at Whanganui bay in response to Richard Bull's open project.
- 1998: Megan Turnbull completes the first female ascent of El Topo (28), probably the hardest climb completed by a New Zealand woman at the time.

=== 2000s ===
- 2000: Sebastian Loewensteijn climbed "Check Your Head" (V10) at Baring Head, establishing NZ's first V10.
- 2003: Mayan Smith-Gobat was first woman to climb 8a (Grade 29) in NZ
- 2005: Mayan Smith-Gobat was first woman to climb 8a+ (Grade 30) in NZ.
- 2008: First ascent of The Giving Tree (31) by Mayan Gobat-Smith at Little Babylon.

=== 2010s ===
- 2013: Wiz Fineron climbed an open project at White Falls to create Immortal Technique (32) the hardest climb in the North Island at the time.

== See also ==
- History of rock climbing
