= John C. H. Grabill =

American photographer (1849–1903)

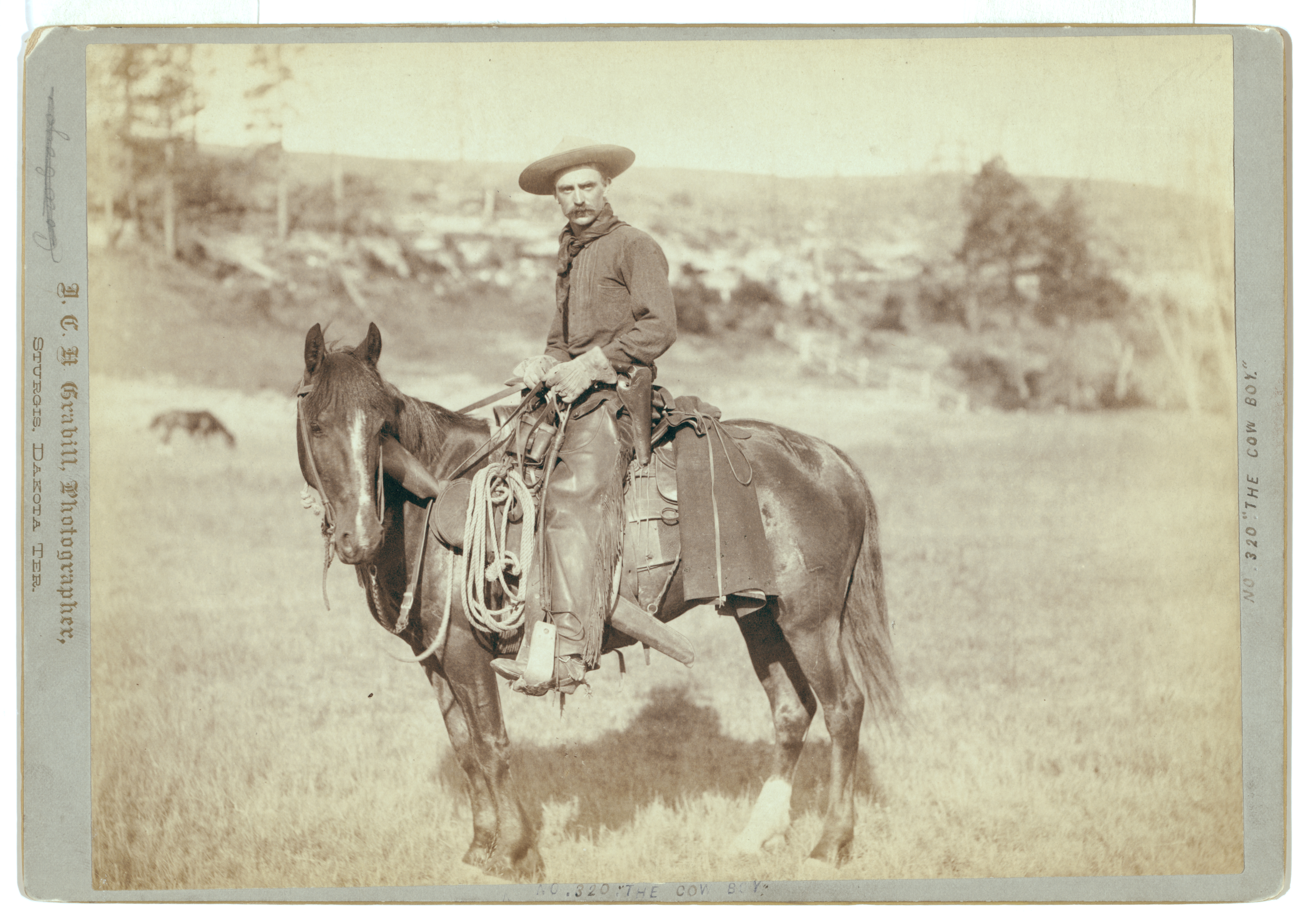
- Grabill's iconic photograph "THE COW BOY" from the Library of Congress
- Born: 1849; Donnelsville, Ohio, United States
- Died: August 23, 1903 (aged 53–54); Saint Louis, Missouri, United States
- Occupation: Photographer
- Spouse(s): Margaret "Maggie" Gillespie (m. 1885; div. 1892); †1917
- Children: Ralph Gillespie Grabill (1887–1952)
- Writing career
- Genres: American Indian Wars, Sioux, early Indian Reservation Period, Western Americana
- Notable works: Photographs of the early Pine Ridge Indian Reservation, the Sioux Indians, the aftermath of the Wounded Knee Massacre

John C. H. Grabill (1849 – 23 August 1903) was an American photographer, known for his historical photographs, most of which were taken in South Dakota. He was born at Donnelsville, Ohio in 1849, the youngest son of David Grabill, a carpenter by his wife Catherine, née Kay. By 1860 the family had relocated to Champaign, Illinois where Grabill spent his formative years. He was involved in mining in Pitkin and Chaffee Counties in Colorado.

Grabill had studios in Buena Vista, Colorado, Sturgis, Deadwood, Lead City and Hot Springs, South Dakota and Chicago, Illinois. He was the official photographer of the Black Hills and Fort Pierre Railroad and the Homestake Mining Company in South Dakota. Between 1887 and 1892 Grabill sent 188 photographs to the Library of Congress for copyright protection. These photographs are now in the public domain.

== Mining ==
Grabill was involved in mining and prospecting in the Aspen, Climax and Buena Vista, Colorado area as early as 1880. He was the owner, with partner H. McCall, of the Mammouth and Vallejo mines on Aspen Mountain. He was involved in placer mining in Chaffee County as early as 1883. Grabill had an assay office in Buena Vista, which burned down in 1883. He opened a second office only a short time later in a different building. Grabill grubstaked Nelson ("Nels") Wanemaker to stake three claims on Mount Antero for gold. Nelson Wanemaker is credited with the discovery of aquamarine and other beryllium minerals on Mount Antero in Chaffee County. Grabill was also in the electroplating business. Grabill was a Templar. Kenneth Hartley took over the assay office in 1886.

On October 3, 1885 Grabill married Margaret "Maggie" Gillespie, formerly of Illinois, a teacher.

== Photography ==
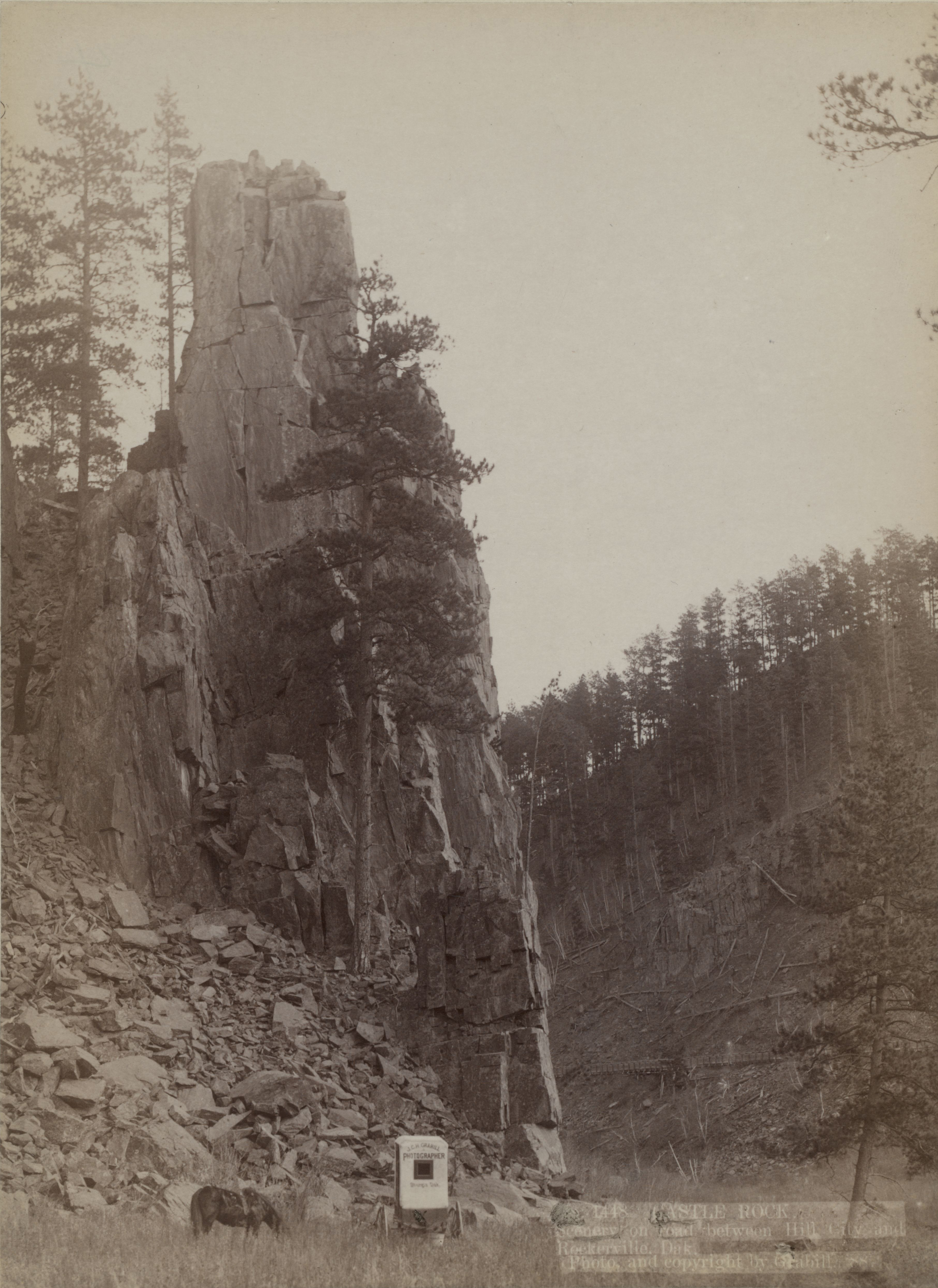
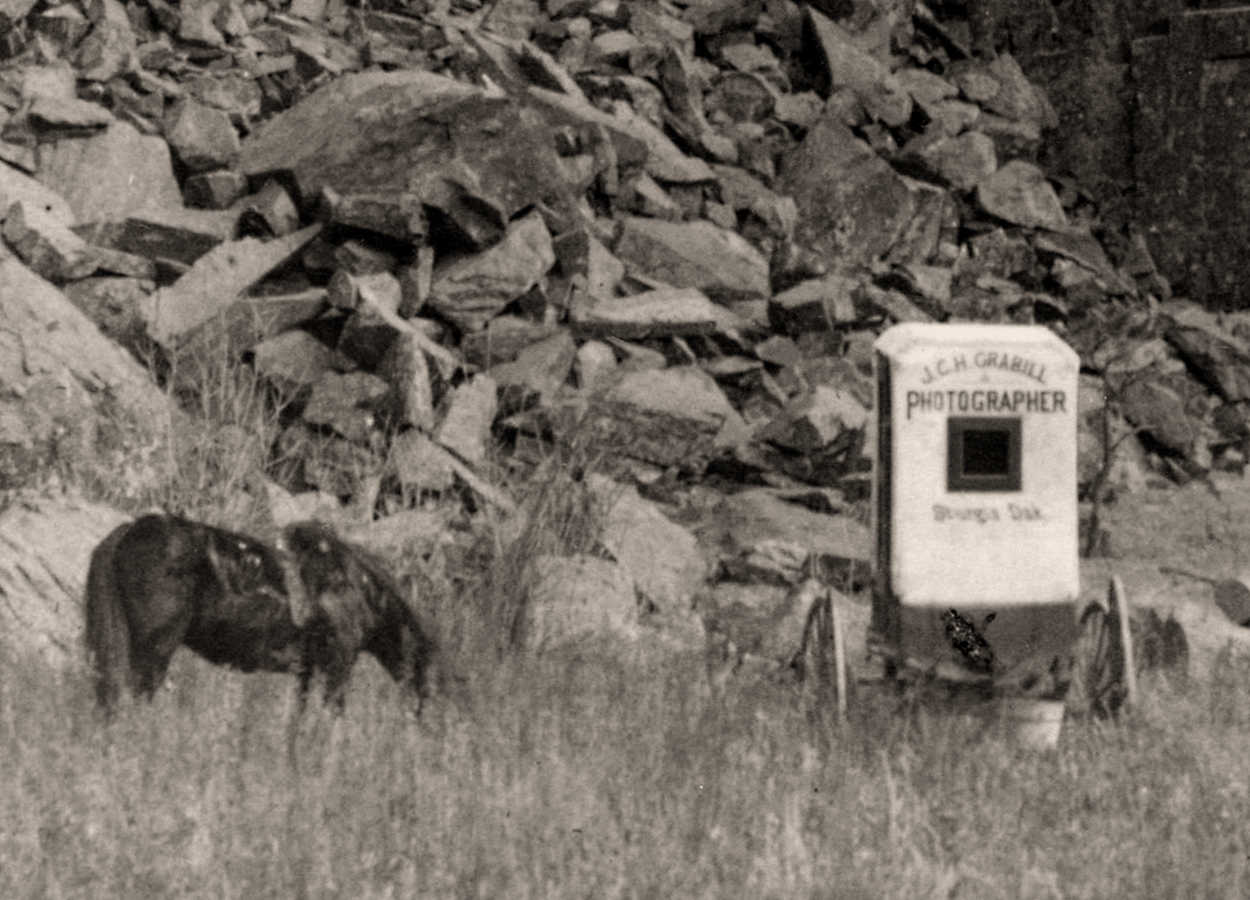
Grabill's photography wagon and horse parked in front of Castle Rock Butte, South Dakota (1888); below, a close up image of the photograph

One of Grabill's earliest known photographs shows his photography studio and mining exchange in Buena Vista. He opened a photographic studio in Buena Vista in December 1885. He is noted in the local paper as producing fine photographs in March 1886.

In June 1886 Grabill set off on a photographic expedition to the Northwest. In July 1886, on a trip to Fort Fetterman, Rapid City and other points north for the benefit of his health, Grabill suddenly became very sick in Cheyenne and Mrs. Grabill traveled to Cheyenne to help him. Before opening his studio in Sturgis, he went on a "typographical tour that included Nebraska, Kansas, Arkansas and Texas but found no country that pleased him better than the Hills". Grabill bought the McIntyre building in Sturgis, South Dakota and remodeled it as a residence and photographic studio in November 1886.

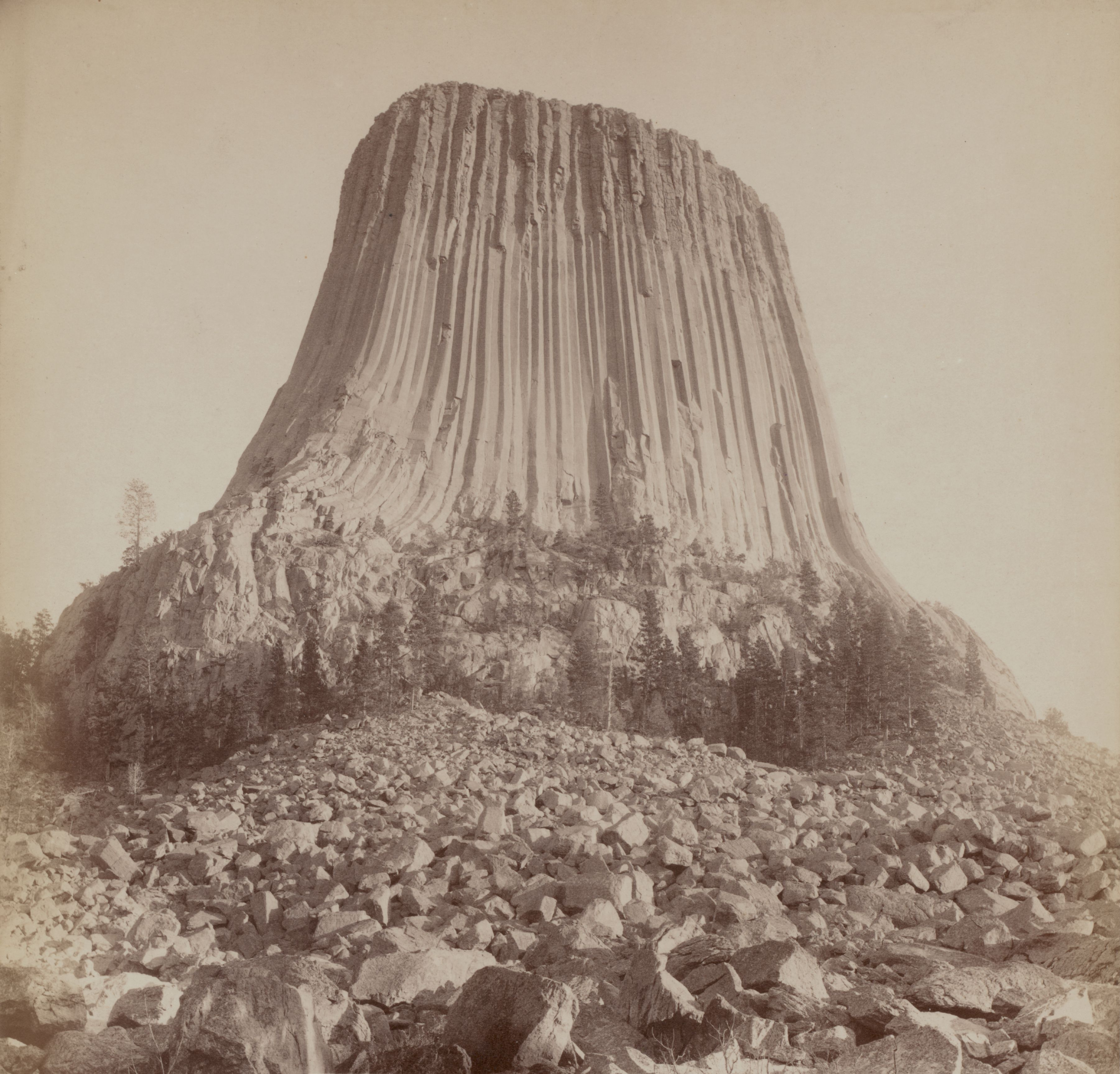
Grabill photograph of Devils Tower, Wyoming (1890)

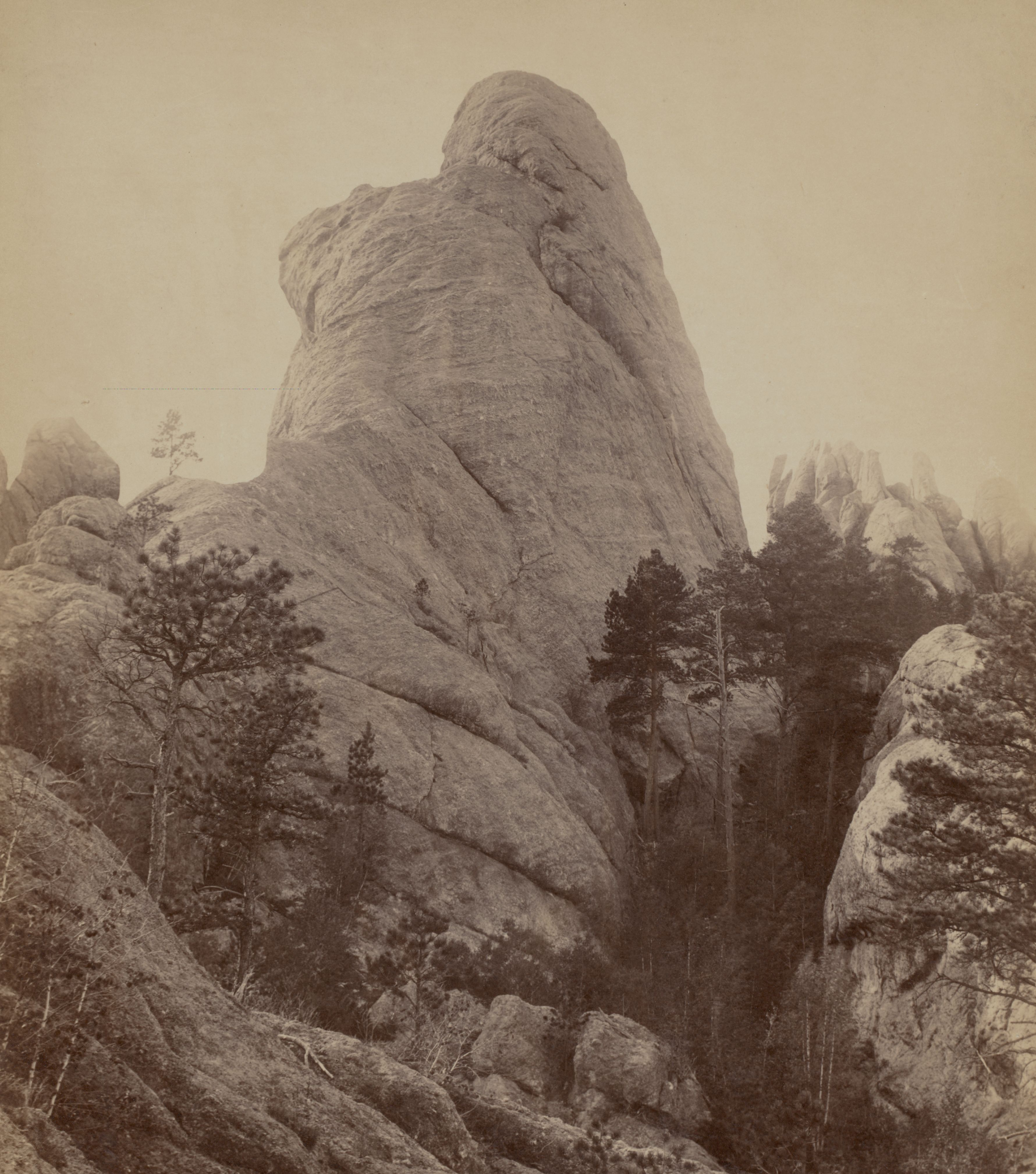
Grabill photograph of Calamity Peak, Black Hills of South Dakota (1891)

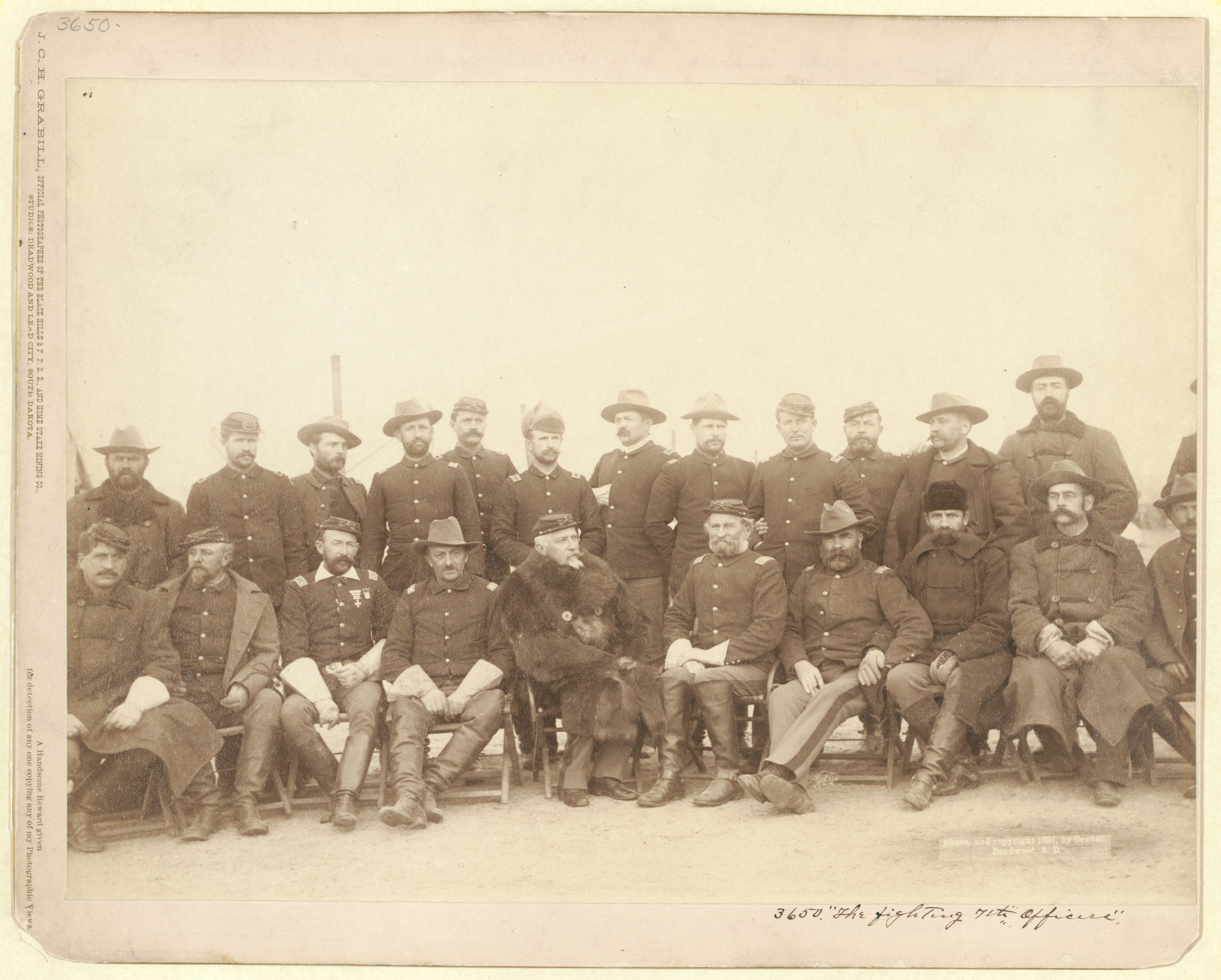
Grabill portrait of the officers of the 7th Cavalry Regiment two weeks after the Wounded Knee massacre (1891)

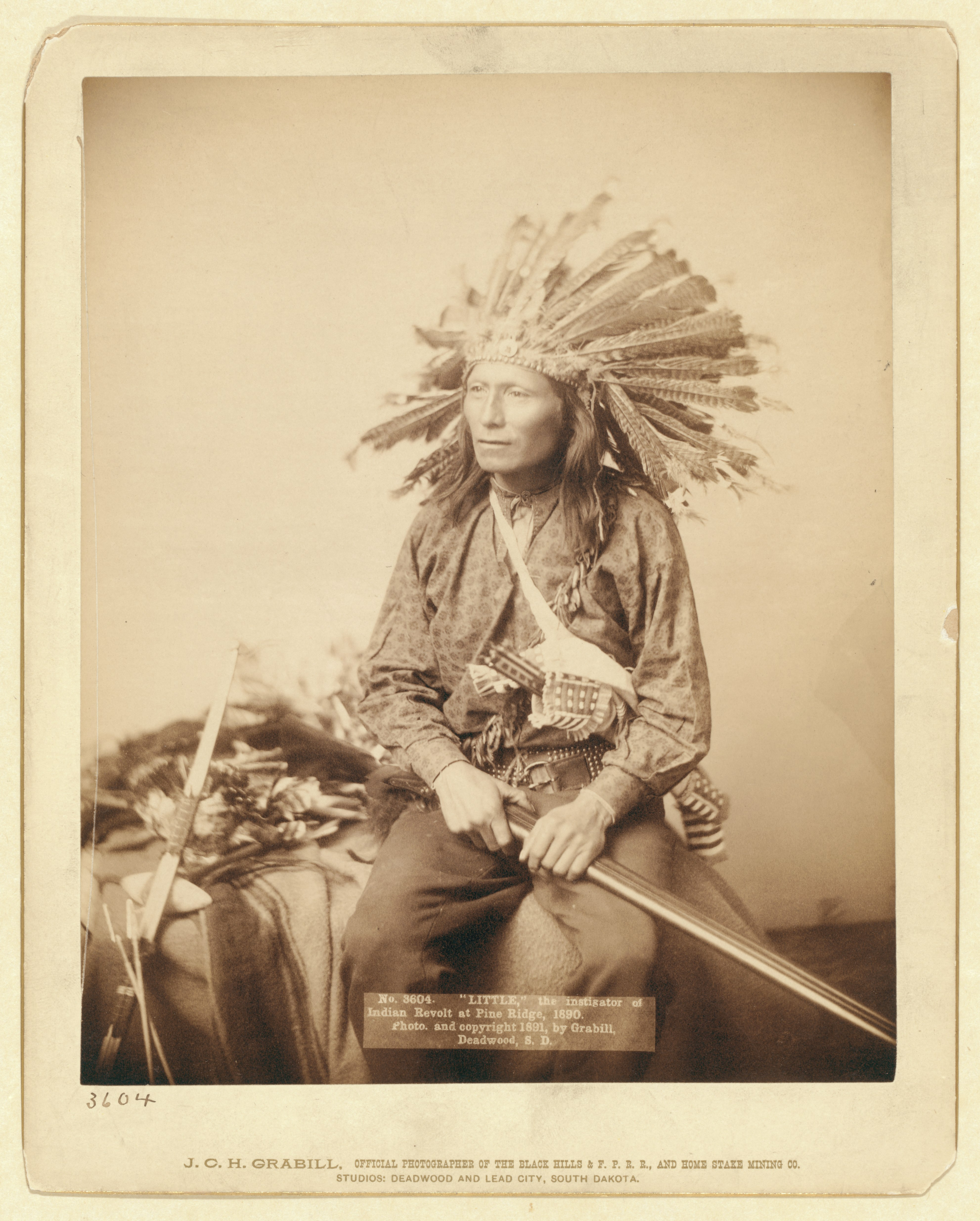
"Little", instigator of Indian revolt at Pine Ridge, 1890

In 1889 the local papers reported that Grabill was moving to Chicago. Grabill returned to the Hills and opened a new studio in Deadwood in 1891. Many articles about Grabill appear in the local papers through 1892. Many of these mention his travels to take photographs, such as his famous photographs taken during the "Indian troubles" in eastern South Dakota. These are so specific that one could actually date many of his prints. Others say that he was traveling to Hot Springs, Fort Robinson, Lead, Chadron and other locations to start studios.

He was defrauded of significant money by Frank Knapp.

In October 1890 Grabill traveled to Devils Tower to get signatures on a petition to create a Devil's Tower National Monument. This was presented to the President, Congress and Secretary of the Interior.

He was in court in 1891 for menacing John M. Watson with a pistol to get him to leave the studio but Watson alleged that he also menaced him with it on the street. Charges against Grabill for assault, filed by Watson, were dismissed as well as a larceny charge against Watson by Grabill but Grabill was put under bonds in the sum of $100 to keep the peace and taxed $20 costs. Grabill was also fined $1 and $24 costs for carrying concealed weapons on a complaint made by Watson. He was in a fight on Main Street with two of his former employees, George Winchester and W. R. Locke. He was the victim of a theft by a man named Hilton. The article alleges that various things, such as photographic prints were stolen from the studio. While Grabill was in Hot Springs three of his employees, Mr. Rogan, Hugh Callaly and Sadie Clayton, quit. He telegraphed Marshall Garr to take charge of the Gallery quickly, alleging that these people were stealing from him. Marshall Garr closed the studio but under orders from Justice Hall to satisfy a fine and costs of $25 he closed it and placed Joseph Richardson there to guard it.

In April 1891 Grabill incorporated the Grabill Portrait and View Company to succeed the business of Mr. Grabill. The company issued 1,000 shares of stock with a par value of $10,000. The company was to start studios in New York, Boston, Baltimore, Chicago and Omaha. This was to allow Grabill to take photographs rather than run the business.

During this time there were rumors that he had incurred significant debt starting these other studios and that he was insolvent. In 1892 Grabill was sued by Charles H. Souder and Christopher S. Hursh. Grabill was unable to pay his debts and the Gallery and its assets were auctioned off to pay his creditors. The finished portraits were purchased by Max Fishel who offered to sell them for 25 cents each. The studio was acquired by Messers. Locke & McBride who continued to operate it.

In 1892 Grabill was divorced.

In 1892 and 1893 the Chicago Portrait and View Company was insolvent and being sued by its creditors. In 1893 The World's Columbian Exposition was held in Chicago. Grabill took photographs during this event.

In 1893 Grabill sued the Wild West Show in Federal court for copyright infringement and sought an injunction against Buffalo Bill for copying and distributing his photographs of Indian scenes at Pine Ridge and South Dakota. The backs of Grabill's prints from this period were stamped with "Grabill Chicago Portrait and View CO., 113 Adams Street, Opposite Post Office, CHICAGO." For example, the Elmo Scott Watson collection at the Newberry Library in Chicago contains an original sepia-tone print of his iconic photograph "THE COW BOY" with this stamp.

== Family and personal life ==
His wife Maggie left him with their four-year-old son in 1891, relocating to Chicago and soon thereafter to Denver. She sued for divorce which was granted, uncontested, in January 1892. They would never see each other again. His son Ralph was raised by a maternal aunt in Denver and was educated at the University of Colorado in Boulder attaining a degree in engineering. Grabill's parents got divorced in 1868 while they lived in Champaign IL. His mother Catherine relocated to Chicago and operated a boarding house for a number of years in that city, only to return to Champaign where she would remarry in 1879 to the widowed windmill manufacturer Daniel L. Roots. That marriage did not last, ending in divorce in 1884. She relocated to Kankakee IL where she operated a boarding house. In November 1893 Catherine Grabill got involved in a domestic dispute between one of her lodgers and the latter's estranged husband who murdered both women in the course of an altercation. Grabill's older brother Elias D. Grabill was educated as a lawyer and briefly ran a law practice in Champaign, but soon switched to teaching school. He lived in his later years in Kankakee IL. Another brother, Newton A. Grabill was a veteran of the American Civil War. Although he was married, he spent most of his remaining life after the war in and out of homes for disabled veterans. Grabill's two sisters, Elizabeth and Mary both married Chicago livestock brokers. Grabill lived In St. Louis, Missouri between 1901 and 1903 working as a salesman for Fairbanks, Morse and Company who manufactured, among other things, hydraulic pumps which were used by the mining industry. His mental health had deteriorated causing him to be institutionalized in February 1903 at the St. Louis City Insane Asylum where he died on August 23 of that year. The death certificate gives the cause of death as paralytic dementia, a disease attributed to syphilis. John C. H. Grabill was buried the day after his death at St. Matthew's Cemetery in St. Louis.
