= Ferrymead Heritage Park =

Museum in Christchurch, New Zealand

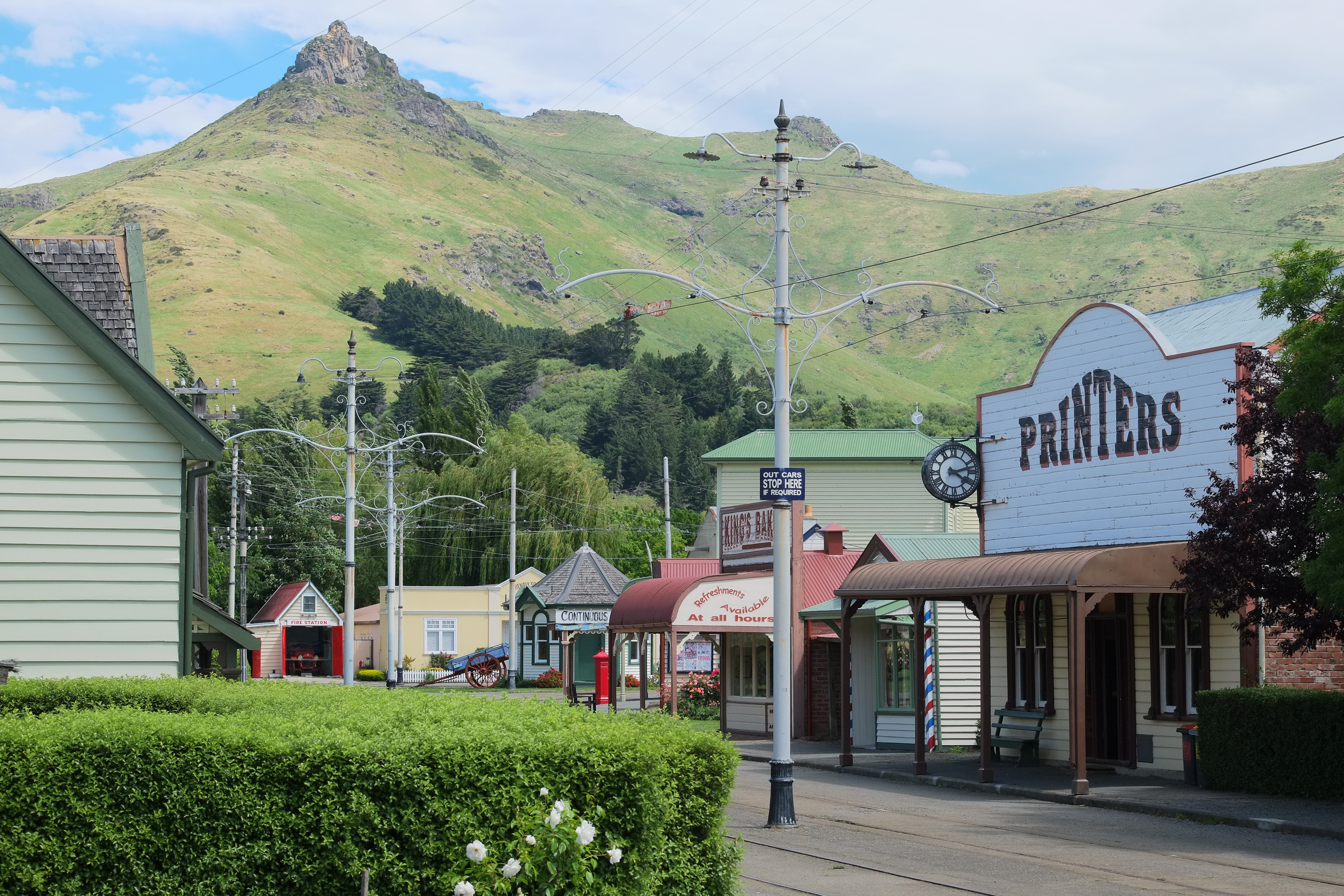
- The main street of the replica historic village, with Te Tihi-o-Kahukura / Castle Rock visible in the background
- Former name: Ferrymead Historic Park, Museum of Science and Technology
- Location: Ferrymead, Christchurch, New Zealand
- Website: Official website

Ferrymead Heritage Park is an outdoor museum in Christchurch, New Zealand.

First known as the Museum of Science and Technology and later Ferrymead Historic Park, it was founded in 1964 by a collection of local heritage enthusiast groups who had a common need for space to store and display their assets. It is in the Heathcote Valley, at the site of New Zealand's first public railway. The museum is open to the public and operated mostly by volunteers.

== Features ==
Ferrymead is built around a replica Edwardian era village. The buildings of the village are a mixture of replicas and genuine historic buildings that have been moved to the site. The buildings include a church, a theatre, residential cottages, a prison, and a Masonic lodge. The interiors of many buildings are fully decorated as static demonstrations, including functional kitchens in some cottages. The town centre also has a train station to serve the short stretch of track used for moving and demonstrating trains. The village has a main street, which is lined with electrified tram tracks that loop around the town.

The various heritage societies that operate from the park exhibit their collections in the buildings around the park. Most of the exhibits are static displays of heritage equipment and vehicles. On major event days (typically once a month) the societies provide an interactive experience for visitors. Guest can take tram or train rides, see demonstrations of typesetting and printing, use heritage telecommunication equipment, see a working model railway, and more. Park volunteers often dress in period costume to create a greater sense of immersion for guests.

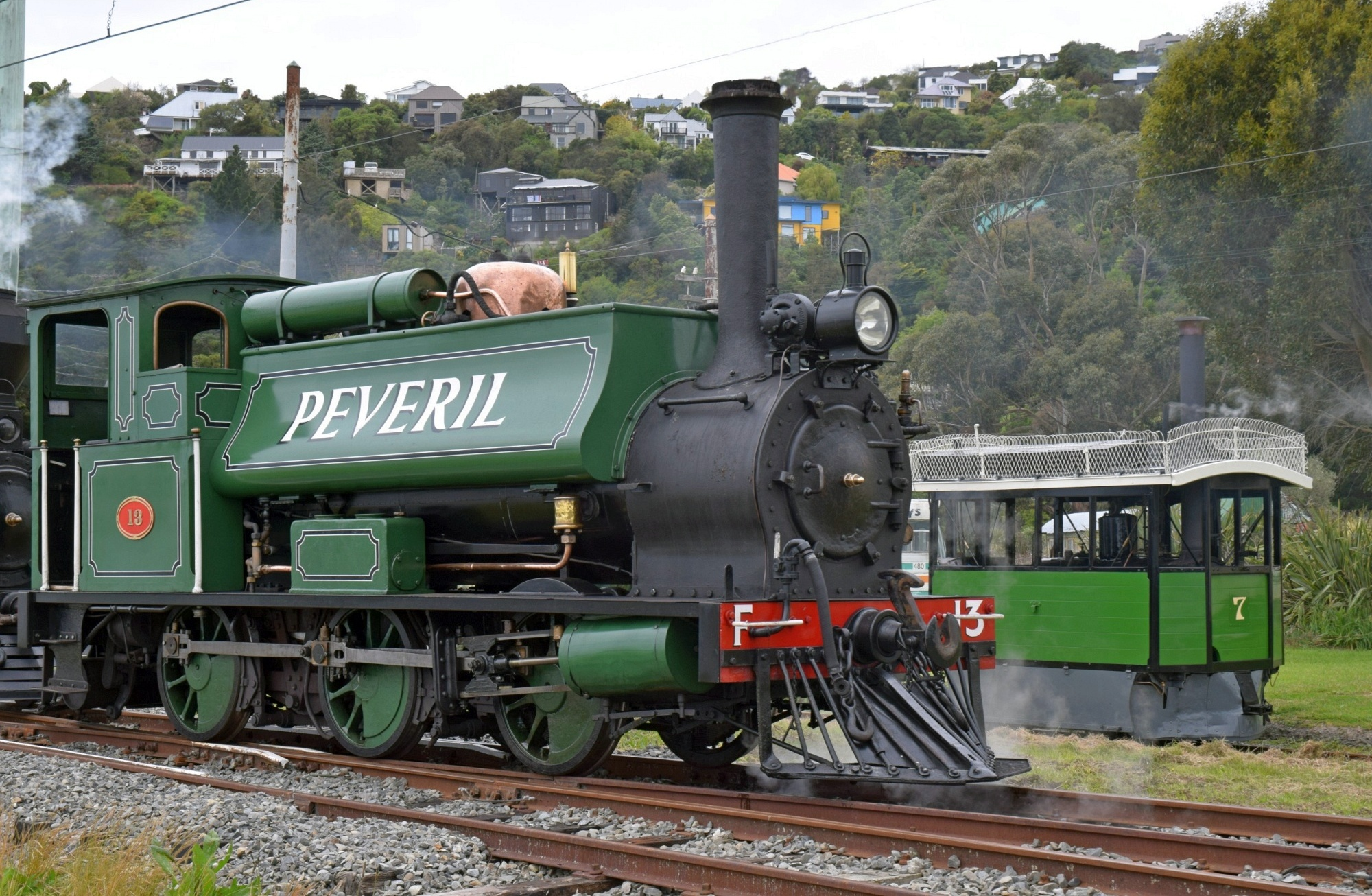
The oldest working steam locomotive in New Zealand, "Peveril", in front of the historic Kitson Steam Tram No. 7. Both still operate at the park.

The park houses a number of notable heritage vehicles. The oldest running steam locomotive in New Zealand, the NZR F Class F13 Peveril, is preserved at the park. The world's only remaining operating Kitson and Company steam tram—No. 7 "Kitty"—is maintained at the park. The bright green Christchurch No. 1 tram, built in New York in 1905 and one of the first electric trams to run in Christchurch, is also still in operation at the park.

== History ==
=== Early railway ===
During the early European settlement of Christchurch, Ferrymead was the location of a ferry that took passengers across the Heathcote River on their way between Lyttelton and Christchurch. For approximately the first 17 years of the colony, beginning in 1850, Ferrymead was a hub of activity, and was the location of the first railway in New Zealand. The railway, opened to steam trains in 1863, was a service built on 5 ft 3 in (1,600 mm) gauge rail that connected the Bridle Path to the wharves at the Heathcote Estuary. The opening of the Lyttelton Rail Tunnel relegated the Ferrymead tracks to little more than a branch line, and the service was closed in around 1867. This made it both New Zealand's first railway to open, and the first to close. After the tracks and buildings were removed, the area remained undeveloped as it was a low-lying swampy area and prone to flooding.

=== Museum of Science & Industry ===
In the mid-1960s an association was formed to create a museum dedicated to "science and industry". This was in part brought about by the prospect of vintage NZR F class locomotives being relocated from the South Island to the North Island at the Auckland Museum of Transport and Technology, so the initial focus was very much on preserving trains. Initial proposals for a location were at Hornby, Prebbleton or Heathcote, with the Prebbleton location being preferred initially. This was due to the proximity of existing track and an existing station building, but ultimately the deal fell through when the government Railways Department decided that increasing industrial activity in the area required the track to remain open. The association finally settled on Hornby. The museum association began outfitting buildings in Hornby in September 1964. The museum initially planned to open to the public in a large warehouse on Garvins Road in Hornby in October 1965, but vandalism at the site delayed this to March 1966.

=== Move to Ferrymead ===
The location in the Heathcote Valley had been on the table from as early as October 1964, but existing train tracks and buildings at Hornby had made that a more viable option in the short term. Within only a few months of the Hornby site being opened, the organisers turned to establishing a presence on the Ferrymead site. This quick move was because the museum had received an unexpectedly large amount of interest from heritage equipment owners keen to provide exhibits, and so needed a larger site to accommodate them all. Additionally, the Tramway Historical Society had been formed with the intention of creating a replica tram track for their rolling stock, which required the additional space available at Ferrymead. The Ferrymead site was provided by the Heathcote County Council. By October 1966 work was well under way to convert the site into a heritage museum, and by April the following year tracks were already being laid.

=== Financial issues ===
Over the following decades, a number of other historical preservation groups came to join the park, and it grew steadily. However, from the very beginning it struggled to remain financially stable. It relied almost entirely on fundraising and volunteers from member organisations contributing their time and expertise to maintain the exhibits. It was initially intended to become a tourist attraction and fund itself through ticket sales, but tourists to Christchurch did not show any interest in visiting the site. Additionally, many of the organisations that moved to the park were not interested in supporting it as a commercial tourist venture; rather, they saw it as a convenient place to have clubrooms and store equipment. This meant exhibits were open at uncoordinated times, or for only a few hours a week, limiting the interest of the park to public visitors.

The park continued to struggle financially through the 1980s and 1990s. In 1985 park management proposed a levy on Christchurch ratepayers to fund the park, though this would have required an act of parliament and never eventuated. In 1995, the financial issues came to a head, and the trust that oversaw the park turned to the Christchurch City Council for help. In February 1996, the park was placed under interim management, and later the same year a deal was struck. Under this deal, the council would purchase a large portion of the park land, and then vest 8 hectares (20 acres) back to the park trust for their use. This effectively served as a bailout of the park to pay off their debt in exchange for the council acquiring the land. The council would also adopt responsibility for park management. The move was controversial among the societies that operated at the park, with some seeing it as a secret plan to eventually close the park and sell the land. The deal ultimately went through, and the park remained open.

=== Modern operation ===
As of 2024 the governance structure of the park is complex. At the top level the park is operated by the Ferrymead Trust, with day-to-day operations handled by Ferrymead Park Ltd, which is wholly owned by the trust. The trust also represents the 15 non-profit societies that operate at the park. Since 2015, the park has received annual grants from the city council averaging NZ$145,000. The remaining balance of the park's annual NZ$750,000 expenses are met through other means.

In 2024 the park again came up against major financial difficulties, this time attributed to low public attendance in the wake of the COVID-19 pandemic and a reduction in funding from local and central government agencies. The park was given a grant of NZ$400,000 by the Christchurch City Council to remain operating. After a change in management at the trust, several board members resigned, apparently in protest of planned changes to make the park more profitable. Executive director Jarrod Coburn said that the park had to become "more than just a men's shed."

In mid-2024 controversy arose at a plan to demolish a brick oven in the replica bakery at the park. The oven was built in the 1970s and had been unused since the 2011 Christchurch earthquake. Park management claimed that the oven was irreparably damaged in the earthquake and was "riddled with asbestos". Groups and individuals associated with the park objected to the proposed demolition, with one saying it would be "sacrilege" to destroy the oven. The demolition plans were put on hold after a "robust" meeting of the member societies.

== Member societies ==
Over the decades since it was opened, a number of non-profit societies have become associated with the park.

=== Canterbury Railway Society ===
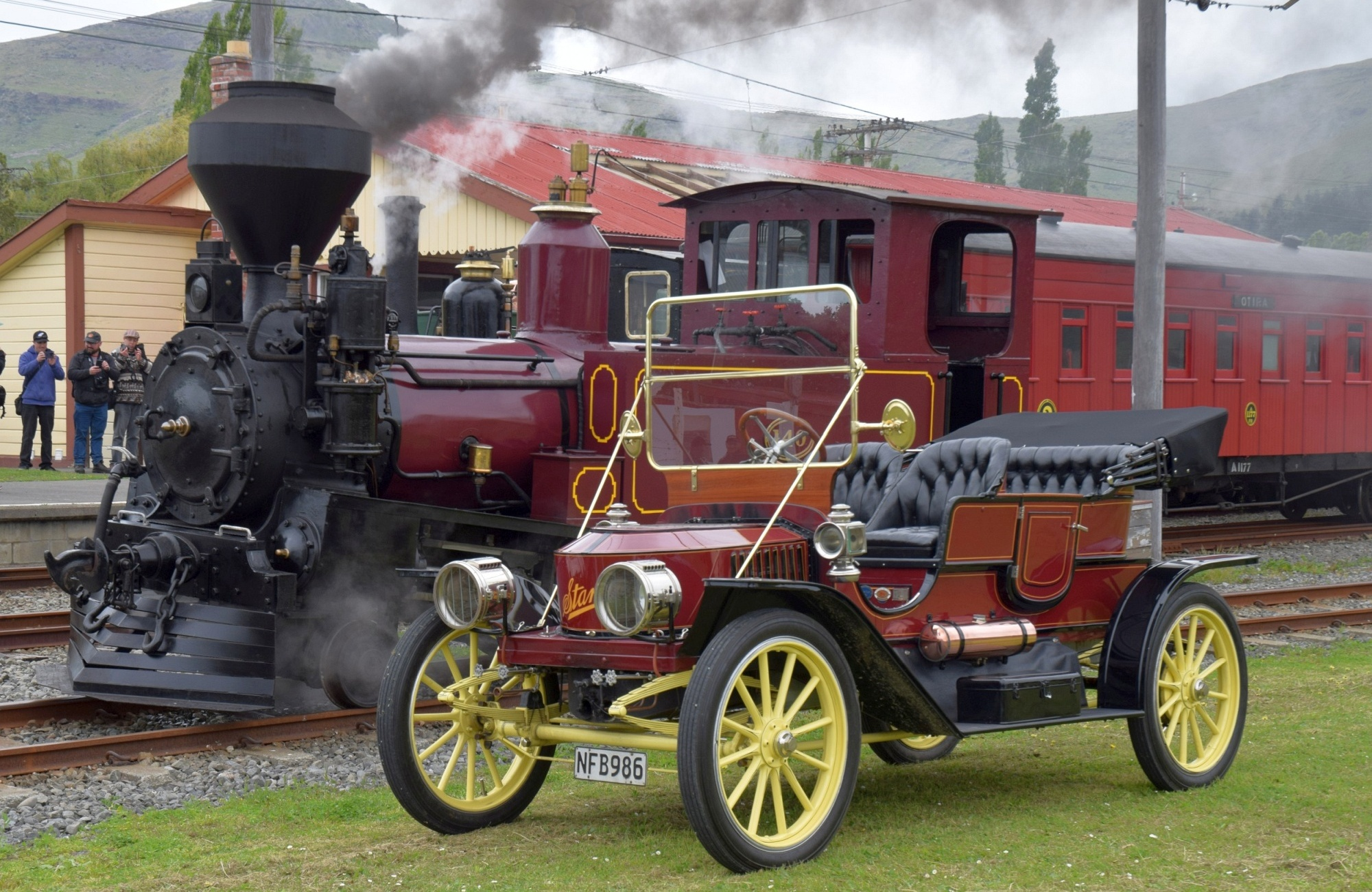
NZR D class locomotive No. 140 next to a vintage car

The Canterbury Railway Society were a founding member of the park. The society operates the 3 ft 6 in (1,067 mm) narrow gauge railway at Ferrymead. They own, restore and maintain heritage locomotives and rolling stock on the site. The society runs the trains for visitors to ride during select park open days.

=== Diesel Traction Group ===
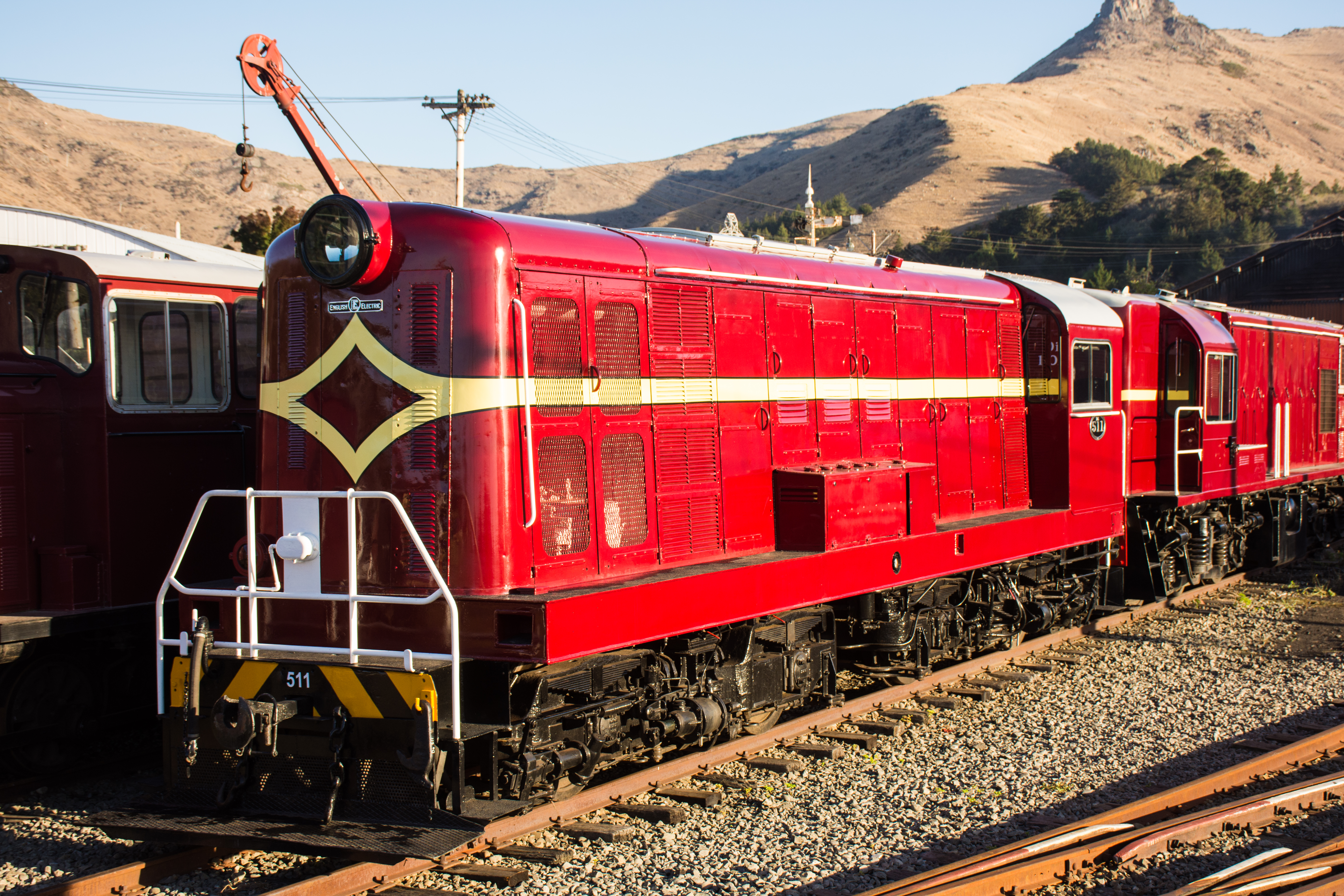
The Diesel Traction Group maintains and restores historic English Electric locomotives at the park

The Diesel Traction Group owns and preserves a number of English Electric diesel-electric locomotives on the site. The locomotives were formerly part of the fleet operated by the New Zealand Railways Department during the mid-twentieth century.

=== Tramway Historical Society ===
The Tramway Historical Society restores and operates trams at the park. During open days, the historic trams make short pleasure journeys on the standard gauge Ferrymead Tramway, between the Ferrymead historical village and the tramway maintenance sheds to the north-east. The society also maintains and operates the trams that run in the central city on the Christchurch tramway system, with the support of the Ferrymead workshop.

=== Other societies ===
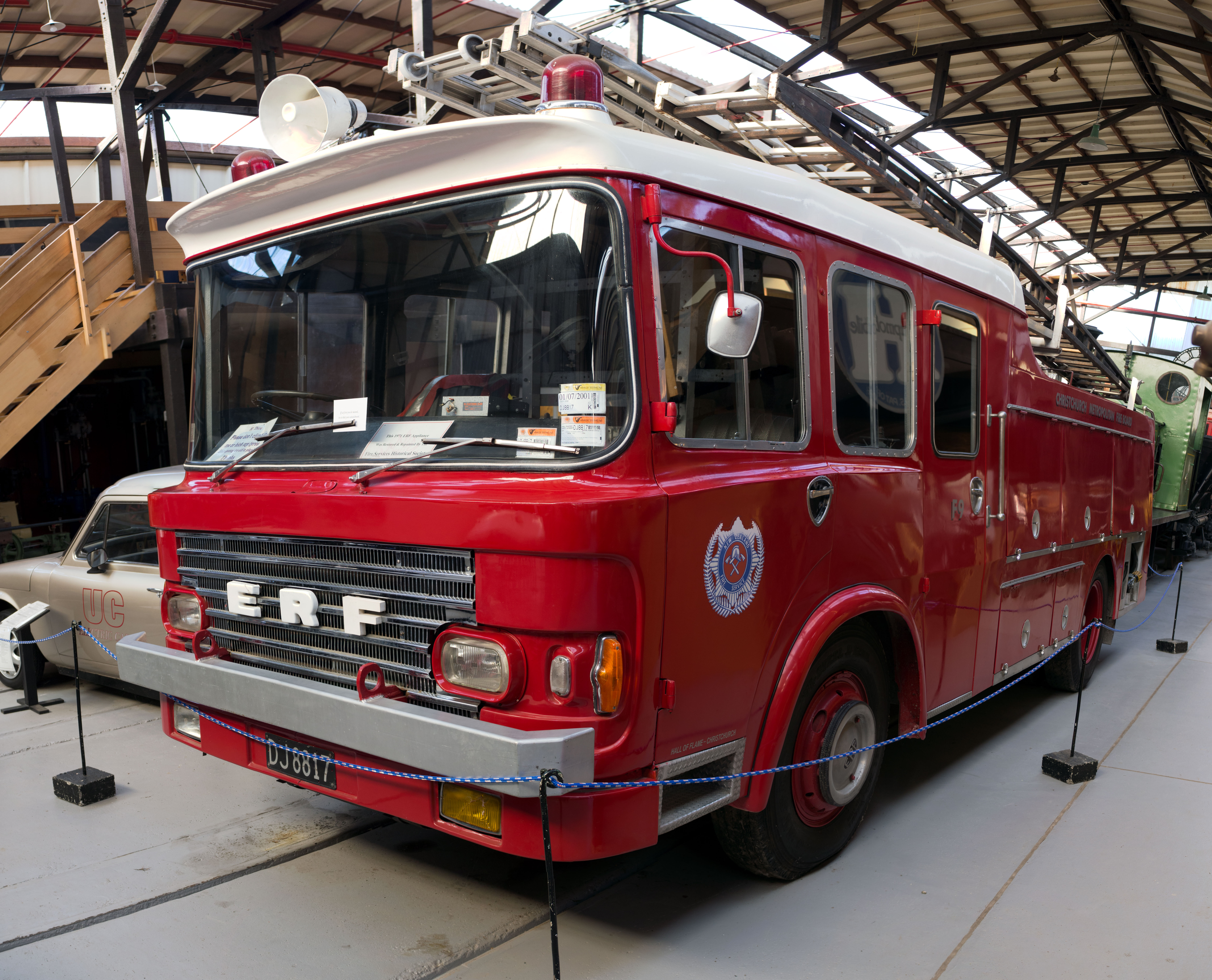
The park hosts the largest collection of heritage fire engines in the southern hemisphere

The Fire Services Historical Society maintains the largest collection of historic fire engines in the southern hemisphere on the site.

The Ferrymead Post and Telegraph Historical Society maintains historic communication equipment from New Zealand postal, telegraphy and telephone services. They maintain historic telephone exchange switching equipment including a manual switchboard and an automated rotary system. The equipment is operable and can be used to make phone calls between rooms.

The Radio Preservation Society operates a broadcast station and transmitter at Ferrymead. The society broadcasts music on 1413 kHz AM at 900 watts from a nearby aerial during weekends. The stations's historic call sign was 3XP. In addition to a working radio broadcast studio, the society maintains a museum of historic radio equipment for visitors.

A number of other smaller historical societies have operated from the park, including:

- Canterbury Centre for Historic Photography & Film Inc.
- Ferrymead Aeronautical Society Inc.
- Ferrymead Printing Society Inc.
- Friends of Ferrymead Fraternity Inc.
- Garden City Model Railroad Club Inc.
- Heathcote Studios Theatrical Society Inc.
- Lions Club of Ferrymead Inc.
- Society of Rural History Inc.

== Geography ==
The heritage park is in the lower Heathcote Valley. To the north is a bend in the Ōpāwaho / Heathcote River just before it enters the estuary. To the south-west the Main South Line passes the park, and provides a connection between the park and the national rail system. A large amount of land in the area, including the heritage park itself, is owned by the Christchurch City Council.

Being close to the sea and low-lying, the entire area is part of a flood management zone. Since the involvement of the Christchurch City Council, portions of the unused land surrounding the park have been sold or leased for development by other recreational businesses including a golf club and paintball field. In 2024 a large area of unused land was set aside for ecological restoration into a wetland as part of the Ferrymead Regional Park.

An area near the park was used by the Heathcote County Council as a landfill. The raised location known as "Woods Hill" was formed artificially by the large-scale compacting of refuse dumped there over a number of years. In 2020 the landfill was one of several identified as presenting a risk of releasing toxic material into the estuary.

== See also ==
- List of New Zealand railway museums and heritage lines
