= Castle Rock, Oregon =

Castle Rock, Oregon may refer to:

- Castle Rock, Morrow County, Oregon, a former post office in Morrow County, Oregon
- A fictional community that is the setting for Stand by Me
- Castle Rock, Clatsop County, Oregon

== See also ==
- Castle Rock (disambiguation)
