= Castle Rock (Chelan County) =

Mountain in Washington (state), United States

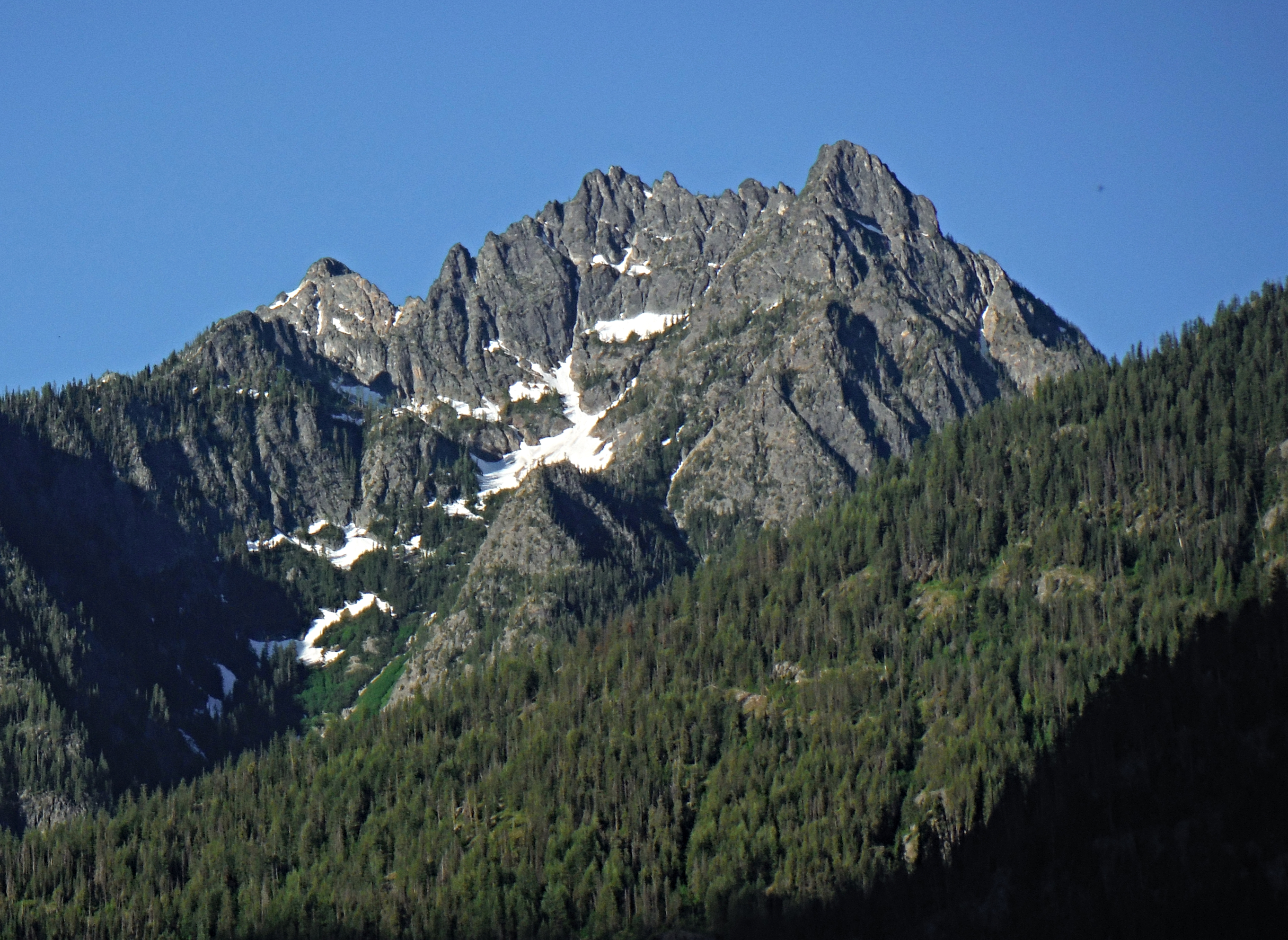
- Castle Rock from Lake Chelan

Highest point
- Elevation: 8,166 ft (2,489 m)
- Prominence: 579 ft (176 m)
- Parent peak: Flora Mountain (8,328 ft)
- Isolation: 1.0 mi (1.6 km)
- Coordinates: 48°15′27″N 120°41′34″W

Geography
- Location within Washington (state) Location within the United States
- Country: United States
- State: Washington
- County: Chelan
- Protected area: Glacier Peak Wilderness
- Parent range: North Cascades; Cascade Range
- Topo map: USGS Stehekin

Climbing
- First ascent: 1917 by Geodetic Survey
- Easiest route: Scrambling class 2-3

Castle Rock is an 8,166-foot (2,489-metre) mountain summit located on the shared border of Glacier Peak Wilderness and Lake Chelan National Recreation Area in the North Cascades of Washington state. The mountain is situated above the western shore of Lake Chelan in Chelan County, on land managed by Wenatchee National Forest. The nearest higher peak is Flora Mountain, 0.7 mi (1.1 km) to the south. Precipitation runoff from the peak drains into Lake Chelan via Castle Creek, Canyon Creek, and Bridal Veil Creek. Topographic relief is significant as the summit rises 7,066 feet (2,154 meters) above the lake in 2.5 mile (4 km).

== Climate ==
Weather fronts originating in the Pacific Ocean travel northeast toward the Cascade Mountains. As fronts approach the North Cascades, they are forced upward by the peaks of the Cascade Range, causing them to drop their moisture in the form of rain or snow onto the Cascades (Orographic lift). As a result, the North Cascades experiences high precipitation, especially during the winter months in the form of snowfall. During winter months, weather is usually cloudy, but due to high pressure systems over the Pacific Ocean that intensify during summer months, there is often little or no cloud cover during the summer.

== Geology ==
The North Cascades feature some of the most rugged topography in the Cascade Range with craggy peaks, spires, ridges, and deep glacial valleys. Geological events occurring many years ago created the diverse topography and drastic elevation changes over the Cascade Range leading to the various climate differences.

The history of the formation of the Cascade Mountains dates back millions of years ago to the late Eocene Epoch. With the North American Plate overriding the Pacific Plate, episodes of volcanic igneous activity persisted. Glacier Peak, a stratovolcano that is 21 mi (34 km) southwest of Tupshin Peak, began forming in the mid-Pleistocene. In addition, small fragments of the oceanic and continental lithosphere called terranes created the North Cascades about 50 million years ago.

During the Pleistocene period dating back over two million years ago, glaciation advancing and retreating repeatedly scoured the landscape leaving deposits of rock debris. The U-shaped cross section of the river valleys is a result of recent glaciation. Uplift and faulting in combination with glaciation have been the dominant processes which have created the tall peaks and deep valleys of the North Cascades area.

== Gallery ==
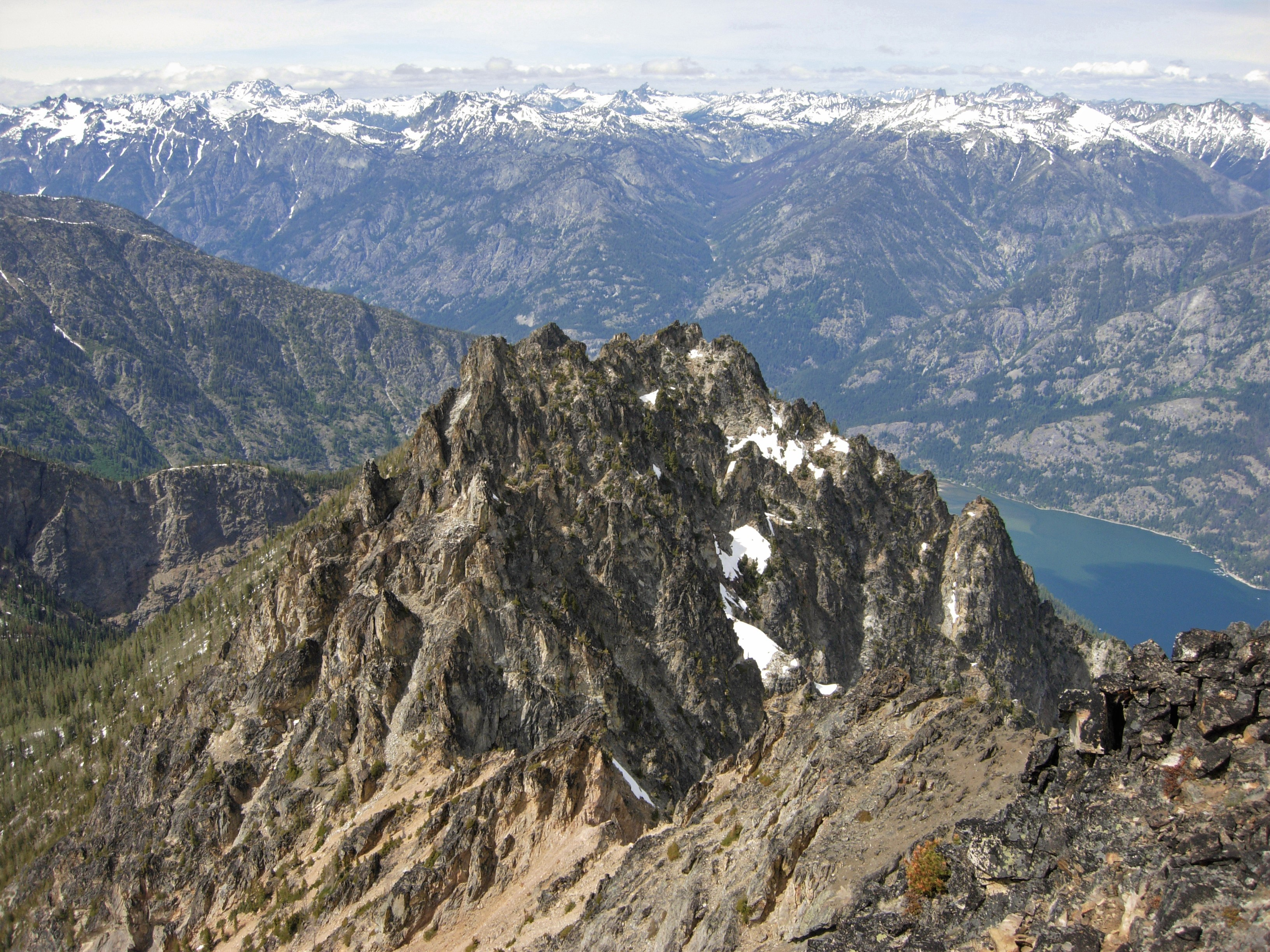
Castle Rock summit view

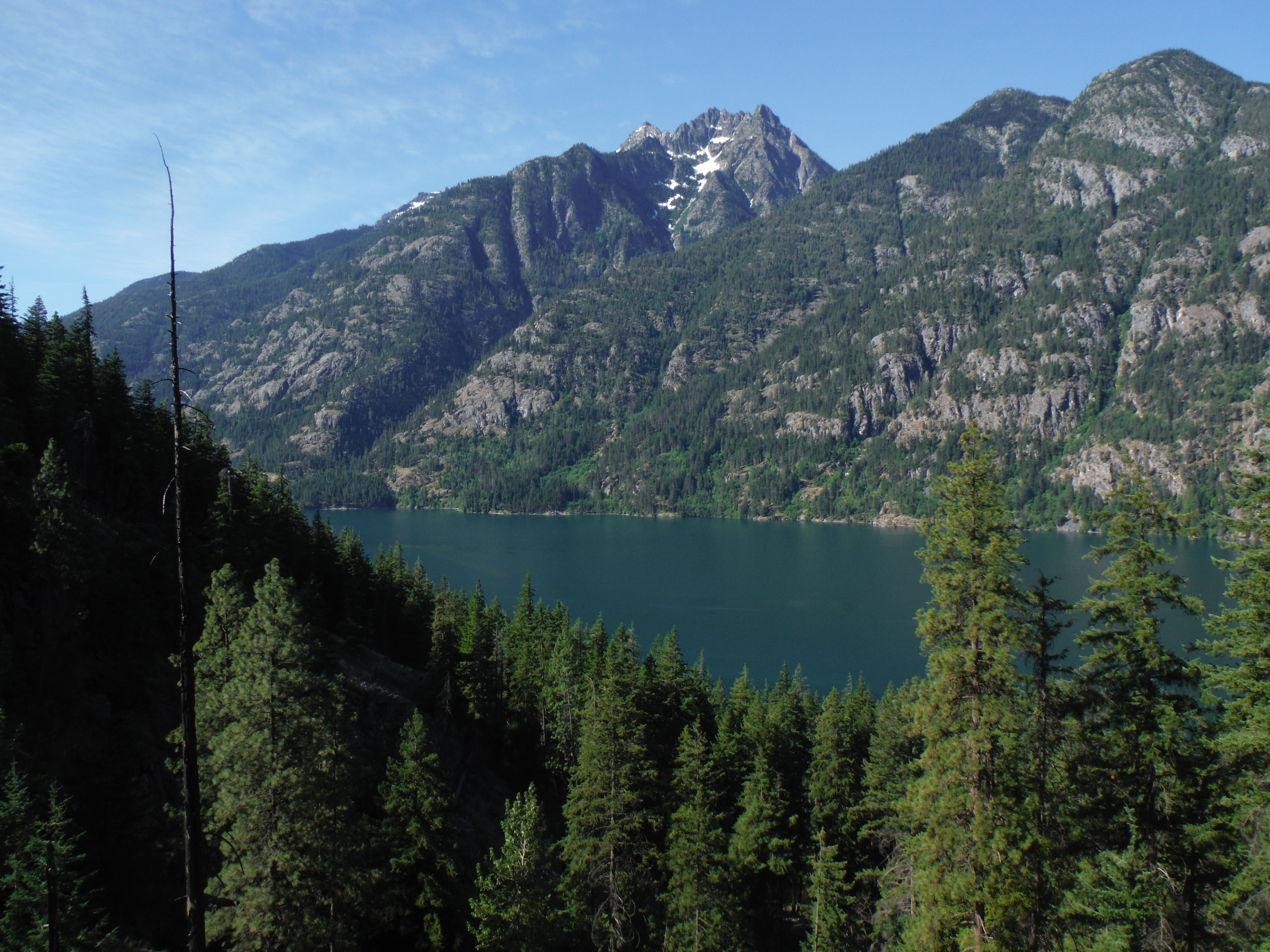
Castle Rock above Lake Chelan

== See also ==
- Geography of the North Cascades
- Geology of the Pacific Northwest
