= Castle Rock (Waikato) =

Mountain in New Zealand

Motutere / Castle Rock
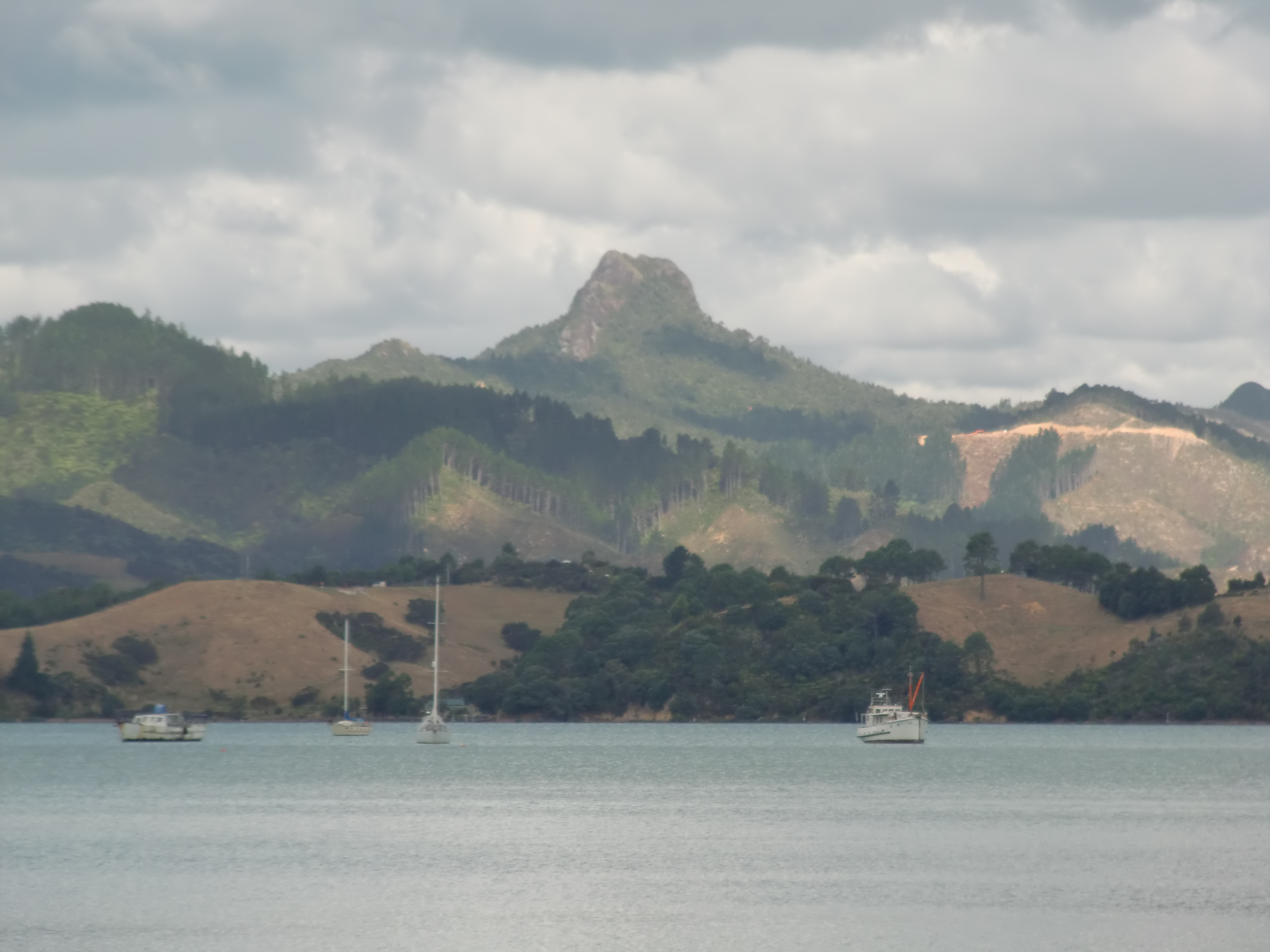
- Castle Rock from the northwest

Highest point
- Elevation: 525 m (1,722 ft)
- Coordinates: 36°48′13″S 175°33′46″E

Naming
- English translation: floating island
- Language of name: Māori

Geography
- Location within New Zealand
- Location: North Island, New Zealand
- Parent range: Coromandel

Climbing
- First ascent: Māori explorers

Motutere / Castle Rock is a 525-metre-high (1,722 ft) mountain southeast of Coromandel, Waikato, on New Zealand's North Island. It was formerly popular for rock climbing, with a number of high bolted routes.

== Geography ==
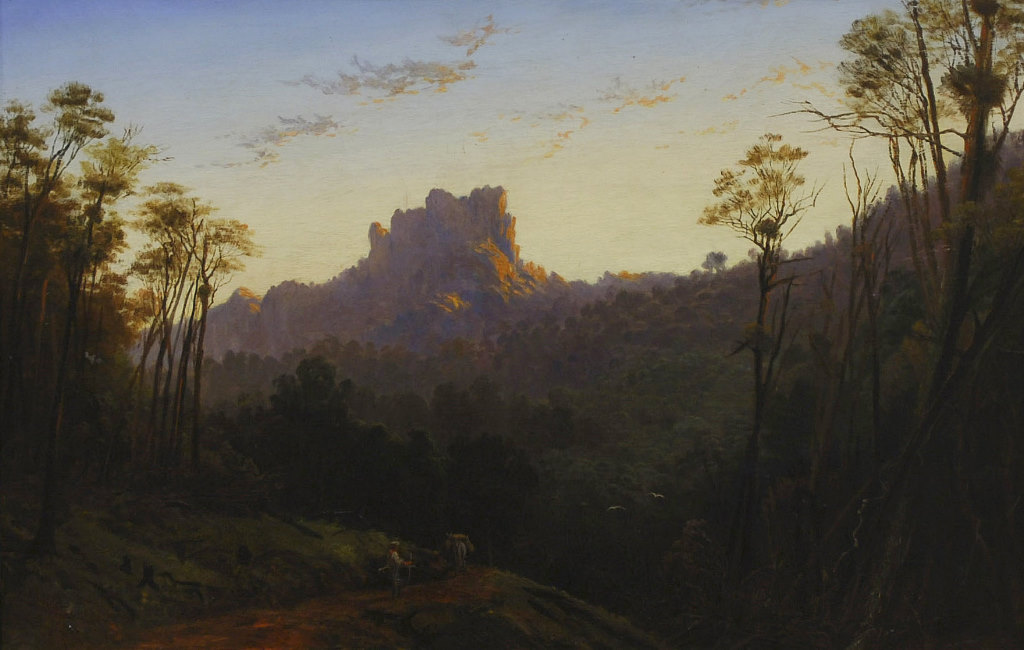
Castle Rock, Coromandel, sunrise, from the Mercury Bay track, an 1899 watercolour by Charles Blomfield

Castle Rock is a prominent peak in the Coromandel Range that lies 8.4 kilometres (5.2 mi) southeast of Coromandel town, north of a 532-metre (1,745 ft) peak also called Motutere (Note: It is not clear why an adjacent peak, only 2.5 kilometres (1.6 mi) distant, apparently bears the same Māori name as Castle Rock.) and south of an unnamed 573-metre (1,880 ft) peak in the headwaters of the westward-flowing Pukewhau Stream.

The mountain is a volcanic plug made from remnants of solidified magma, the softer surrounding rock having been eroded away.

== Māori exploration ==
Motutere means "floating island" a name bestowed by Ruamano, a descendant of Tama-te-kapua. Māori explorers of the area tended to travel along the hill ridges, so avoiding the thick vegetation in the sheltered valleys. Once dusk came they would seek shelter in order to avoid the patupaiarehe who they believed inhabited these hills. The summit of Motutere would be eschewed after dark for this reason.

In 2018, the name of the peak was officially gazetted as Motutere / Castle Rock, to incorporate its original Māori name.

== Climbing ==
As of April 2014, there are 17 different ascents for rock climbers to attempt at the summit of Castle Rock. Routes include Kookmeyer, Budda Wall and the Quiet Earth Wall, with bolted climbs of up to 125 metres (410 ft) on solid rock. Access is via a forestry track that leaves the 309 Road near the Waiau Waterworks visitor centre and involves a 25–40 minute walk in. The track is also suitable for cycling and at the top ridge there are fine views of Great Mercury Island, Cuvier Island, Great Barrier Island and the Firth of Thames. In 2018, two deaths lead iwi to place an indefinite rāhui on the crag.
