= Castle Rock, Wisconsin =

- Town
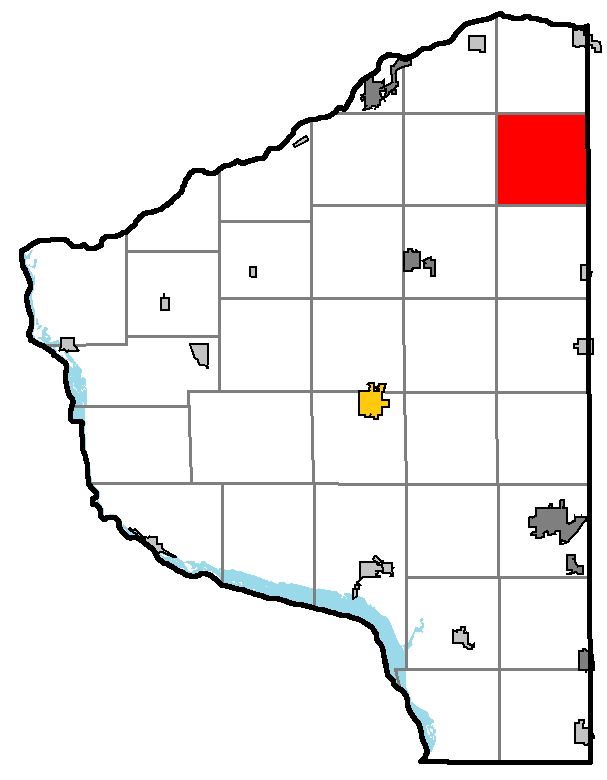
- Location of Castle Rock, within Grant County, Wisconsin

- Location of Grant County, within Wisconsin
- Coordinates: 43°4′24″N 90°29′47″W
- Country: United States
- State: Wisconsin
- County: Grant

Area
  - Total: 35.8 sq mi (92.7 km^{2})
  - Land: 35.8 sq mi (92.7 km^{2})
  - Water: 0 sq mi (0.0 km^{2})
- Elevation: 728 ft (222 m)

Population (2020)
  - Total: 240
  - Density: 6.7/sq mi (2.6/km^{2})
- Time zone: UTC-6 (Central (CST))
  - Summer (DST): UTC-5 (CDT)
- Area code: 608
- FIPS code: 55-13100
- GNIS feature ID: 1582929
- Website: https://castlerock-township.com/

Castle Rock is a town in Grant County, Wisconsin, United States. The population was 240 at the 2020 census. The unincorporated community of Castle Rock is located in the town.

== Geography ==
According to the United States Census Bureau, the town has a total area of 35.8 square miles (92.7 km^{2}), all land.

== Demographics ==
At the 2000 census there were 314 people, 112 households, and 86 families living in the town. The population density was 8.8 people per square mile (3.4/km^{2}). There were 122 housing units at an average density of 3.4 per square mile (1.3/km^{2}). The racial makeup of the town was 97.77% White, 0.32% Native American, 0.32% from other races, and 1.59% from two or more races. Hispanic or Latino of any race were 0.64%.

Of the 112 households 36.6% had children under the age of 18 living with them, 66.1% were married couples living together, 4.5% had a female householder with no husband present, and 23.2% were non-families. 17.9% of households were one person and 5.4% were one person aged 65 or older. The average household size was 2.80 and the average family size was 3.14.

The age distribution was 25.8% under the age of 18, 6.1% from 18 to 24, 27.7% from 25 to 44, 25.8% from 45 to 64, and 14.6% 65 or older. The median age was 40 years. For every 100 females, there were 97.5 males. For every 100 females age 18 and over, there were 108.0 males.

The median household income was $40,000 and the median family income was $44,286. Males had a median income of $18,750 versus $19,792 for females. The per capita income for the town was $16,201. About 2.2% of families and 3.0% of the population were below the poverty line, including none of those under age 18 and 8.5% of those age 65 or over.
