= Horace Holl =

New Zealand mountaineer and rock climber

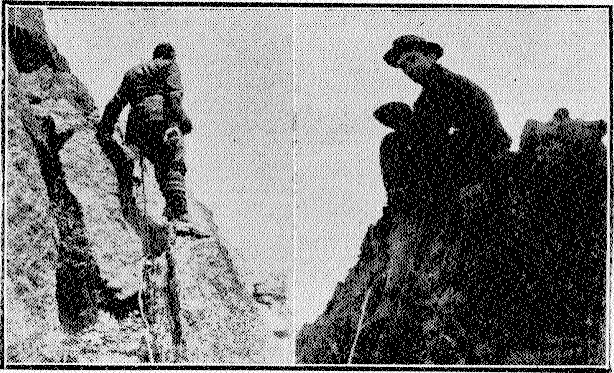
- Born: Horace Arthur Holl; 23 September 1878; England
- Died: 27 May 1927 (aged 48); Mangaturuturu River, New Zealand
- Occupation: Mathematician
- Known for: Mountaineering and rock climbing

Horace Arthur Holl (23 September 1878 – 27 May 1927) was a New Zealand mathematician, mountaineer and rock climber. He climbed extensively in the Southern Alps, including two summits of Mount Cook within a fortnight, first via the Linda Glacier and then via Earl's Route. In the final decade of his life, he made frequent visits to Tongariro National Park and it is estimated that he ascended Mount Ruapehu about 50 times.

Holl was recognised as an enthusiastic rock climber and he was an early New Zealand proponent of rock climbing as a sport independent of mountaineering. He practised rock climbing in Tongariro National Park, as well as on the west coast cliffs, north of Manukau Heads. He was the first to record a traverse of Nga Tohu Pinnacle Ridge on the flanks of Mount Ruapehu (with Frederick Worley in 1925) and he is also credited with pioneering rock climbing routes on Holl's Rock, on the south side of Ngauruhoe.

Holl died while tramping in the Tongariro National Park, when he was swept away attempting to cross the Mangaturuturu River in flood.
