= Castle Rock, Missouri =

Ghost town in Missouri, United States

Coordinates: 38°28′15″N 92°09′18″W

Castle Rock is an extinct town in Osage County, in the U.S. state of Missouri. The townsite lies is located on the inside curve of an incised meander of the Osage River. The Castle Rock formation for which it was named lies across the river to the north in Cole County just southeast of Wardsville. The Pikes Camp Wildlife Area lies to the west across the river.

Castle Rock was laid out in 1856. The community was named for a nearby rock formation which had the form of a castle. A post office called Castle Rock was established in 1856, and remained in operation until 1885. Besides the post office, the community had a schoolhouse.
