= Flora Mountain =

Mountain in Washington (state), United States

- Location within Washington (state)

Highest point
- Elevation: 8,325 ft (2,537 m) NAVD 88
- Prominence: 1,800 ft (550 m)
- Coordinates: 48°14′35″N 120°41′44″W

Geography
- Location: Chelan County, Washington
- Parent range: North Cascades
- Topo map: USGS Pinnacle Mountain

Climbing
- First ascent: September 11, 1940 by Joe Leuthold and Eldon Metzger

Flora Mountain is a mountain summit in Washington in the Cascade Range in Washington state near the shores of Lake Chelan and 24 miles (39 km) south of the Canada–US border in the Glacier Peak Wilderness.

It has been described as a "desolate pile of loose gneiss."
