= Castle Rock (Alaskan mountain) =

Mountain in Denali Borough, Alaska, United States

Coordinates: 63°21′59″N 150°16′28″W

Castle Rock is a mountain in Denali Borough in Alaska in the United States.

Castle Rock is located at 63.366389° North Latitude 150.274444° West Longitude, 26.4 statute miles (42.5 kilometers) from Healy, Alaska. Its peak rises 5,584 feet (1,702 meters) above sea level.
