= Castle Rock Butte =

Summit in South Dakota, United States

Coordinates: 45°00′36″N 103°27′16″W

Castle Rock Butte is a summit in Butte County, South Dakota, in the United States. With an elevation of 3,768 feet (1,148 m), Castle Rock Butte is the 235th highest summit in the state of South Dakota.

The Castle Rock Butte was used by Native Americans, explorers and early settlers as a lookout and reference point during their travels. The butte looked to many travelers like a castle on a hill. The name is credited to Dr. Edwin James, a botanist on Long's Expedition of 1820. The town of Castle Rock is named after this solitary natural landmark.

Castle Rock was so named on account of its castle-like outline.
