= Te Tihi-o-Kahukura / Castle Rock =

Rock outcrop in the Port Hills above Christchurch, New Zealand

Castle Rock
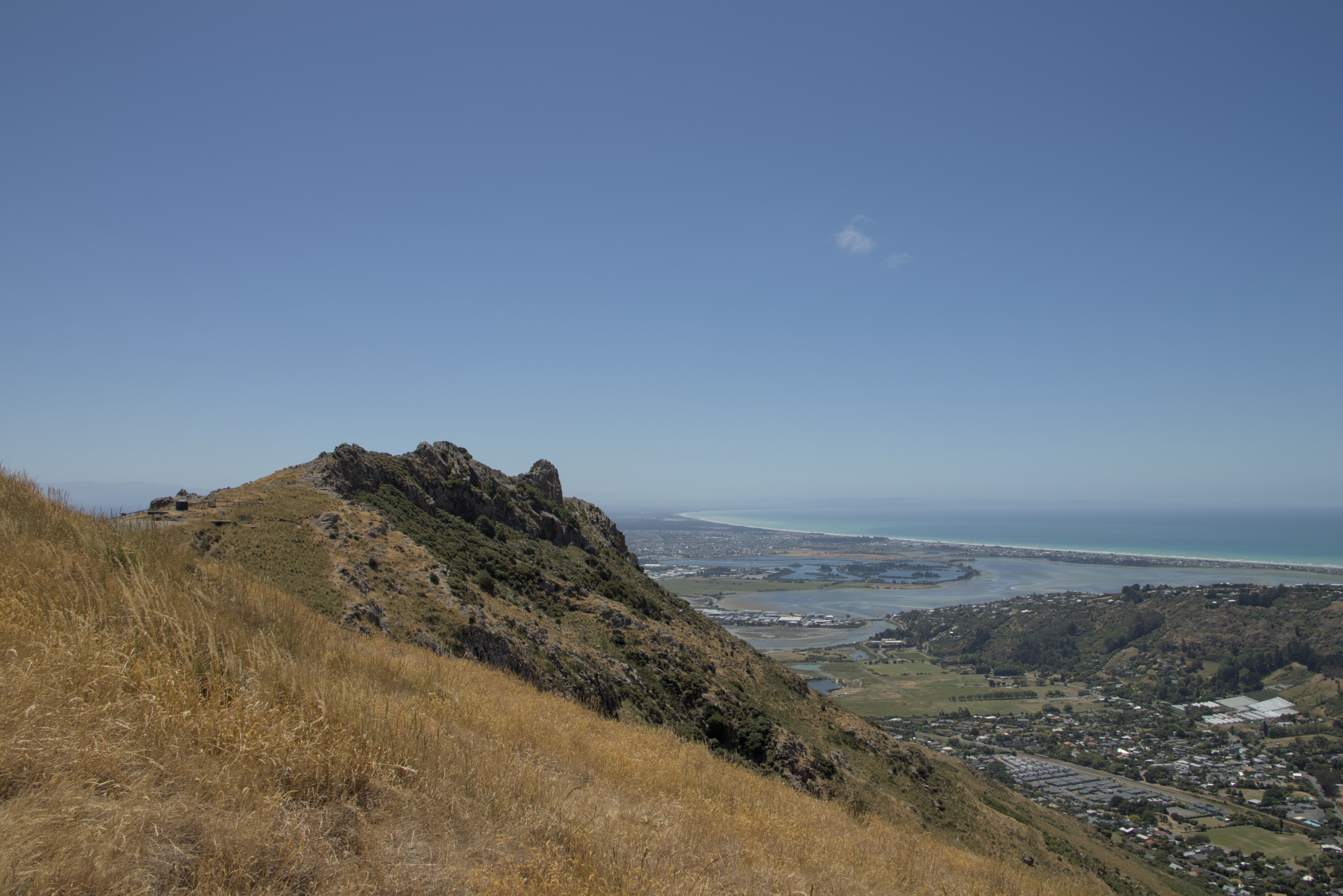
- View of Te Tihi-o-Kahukura / Castle Rock, looking toward Christchurch

Highest point
- Elevation: 429 m (1,407 ft)
- Coordinates: 43°35′13″S 172°41′56″E

Geography
- Location within Banks Peninsula
- Location: Christchurch
- Parent range: Port Hills

Geology
- Mountain type: Basalt volcanic rock

Te Tihi-o-Kahukura / Castle Rock is a prominent rock outcrop in the Port Hills above Christchurch, New Zealand. It is a short distance north of Te Moenga-o-Wheke / The Tors, on the northern side of Summit Road. It sits directly to the west of the Bridle Path and the Lyttelton road tunnel. The rocky outcrop itself is 167 metres (548 ft) long, 83 metres (272 ft) wide and up to 24 metres (79 ft) high.

== History ==
The te reo Māori name roughly means The summit of Kahukura. The area was considered tapu to early Māori, as a pinnacle associated with Kahukura, an atua that manifests as part of a rainbow. According to a tradition, when Ngāi Tahu tribesmen were approaching up the valley below, the chief of Ngāti Māmoe threw his spear from the top of the rock at them as a sign of frustration.

The English name was coined by early European settlers, who used the prominent rock as a navigation reference. Castle Rock is one of the Seven Brothers of hilltops around the Port Hills. It was at various times known as Hammerton Crags, Dover Castle, and Heathcote Rock before the name 'Castle Rock' finally stuck.

The rock was at one time owned by Arthur Dudley Dobson who briefly considered quarrying the rock to sell, however he never went through with these plans.

The area is popular with walkers and rock-climbers.
