= MOTAT collections =

Coordinates: 36°52′04″S 174°43′40″E

This list collects the transport-related vehicles exhibited or owned by the Museum of Transport and Technology (MOTAT) in Auckland, New Zealand.

== Aircraft ==
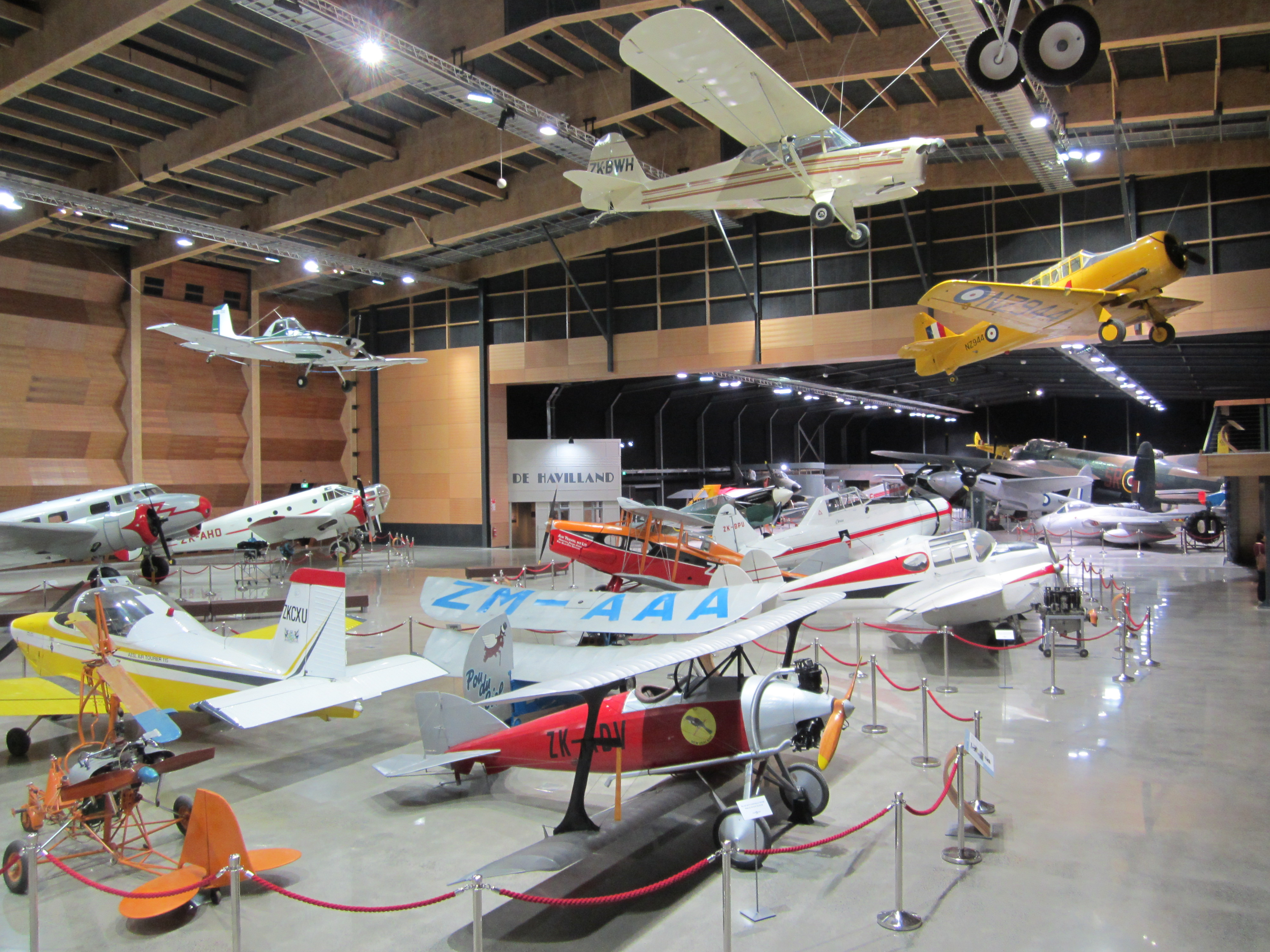
The Sir Keith Park Memorial Aviation Collection at MOTAT 2 in June 2012

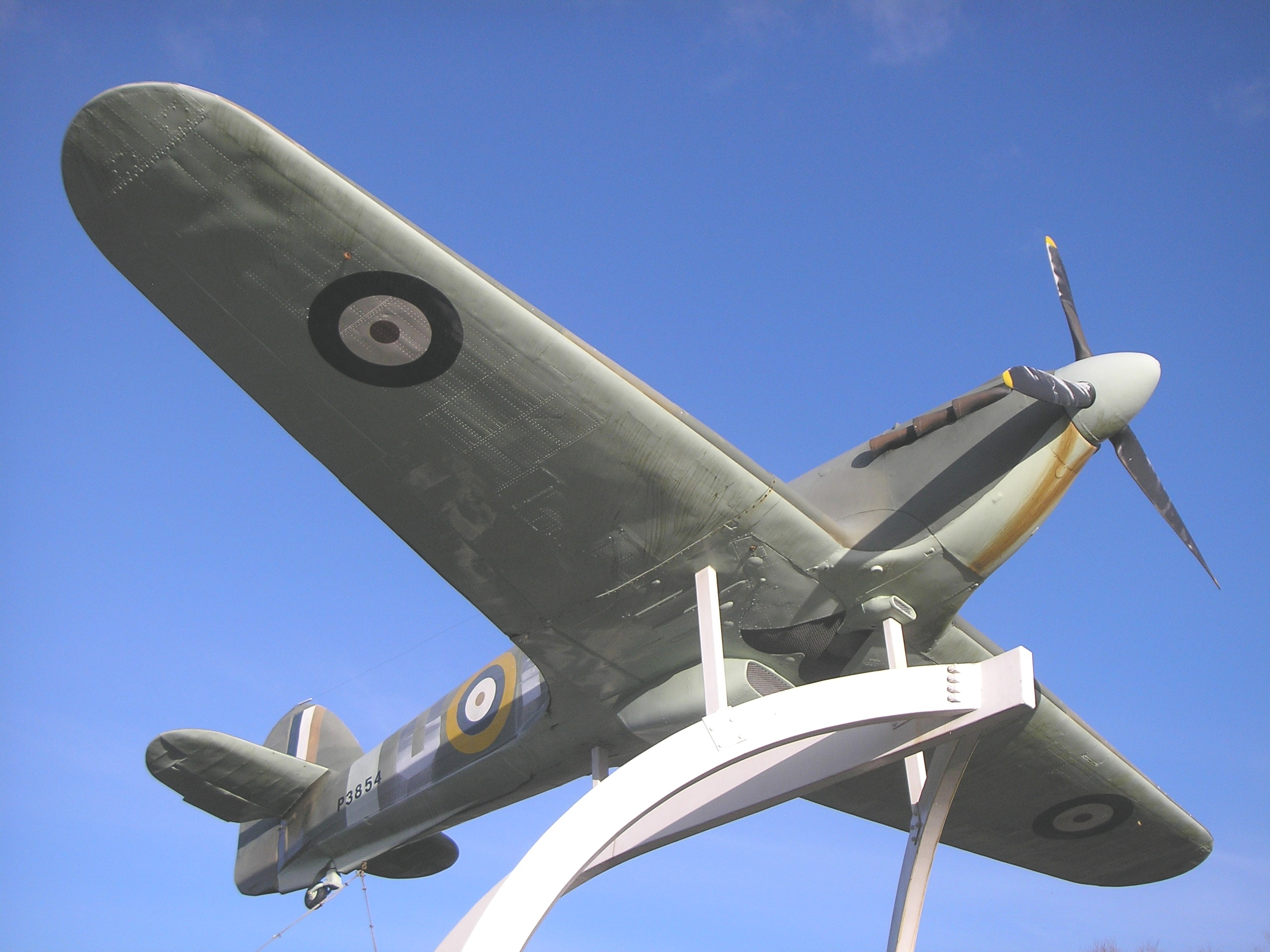
MOTAT's replica of OK1

- Aermacchi MB-339CB NZ6466, c/n 6797. One of 18 advanced jet trainers used by the No. 14 Squadron Royal New Zealand Air Force between 1991 and 2002. RNZAF Base Ohakea, New Zealand. Crew: two, student and instructor Length: 10.97 m (36 ft 0 in) Wingspan: 10.86 m (35 ft 7½ in) Powerplant: 1x Rolls-Royce Viper Mk. 632 turbojet, 4,000 lbf (17.8 kN). Delivered to MOTAT and assembled in public view from 31 July 2012.
- AESL Airtourer 115 ZK-CXU 'Miss Jacy' Cliff Tait's 1969
- Auster J/1B Aiglet ZK-BWH 1947
- Avro Lancaster NX665 1945 RAF Bomber Command Heavy Bomber. WU13 L’Aeronavale (Maritime)
- Beechcraft 18 AT-11-BH Kansan ZK-AHO [1943], c/n 3691, was built for the United States Army Air Forces and allocated the serial 42–37208. It had a date of manufacture of 5 April 1943 and was test flown on 12 April 1943. This flight ended with a wheels up landing at Wichita, Kansas. It was shipped to New Zealand during August 1943 having been sold to the NZ Government for 13,000 pounds. Assembled at Hobsonville and modified by Union Airways for survey duties at Palmerston North. It served well with NZ Aerial Mapping based out of Bridge Pa at Hastings until being withdrawn from use on 31 December 1980. AHO was flown from Hastings to Hobsonville on 19 January 1982 for delivery to the MOTAT. Its registration being cancelled on 16 June 1988.
- Bell 47J Ranger s/n 1865 ZK-HGO This four seat ear;y 1960s helicopter was donated to MOTAT by Helicopters (NZ) Ltd. It was used for over a decade to support the offshore oil rigs and refineries in New Zealand
- Commonwealth Aircraft CA-28 Ceres ZK-BPU 1959 topdresser
- Cessna A188 Agwagon ZK-C00 1966
- Curtiss P-40 Kittyhawk composite P-40E based on NZ3039 1942
- de Havilland DH.83C Fox Moth ZK-APT (painted as ZK-AEK) 1947 airliner.
- de Havilland Dragon Rapide 1930s airliner display in NAC colours following its retirement from service.
- de Havilland Tiger Moth two aircraft with a 1930s trainer, & 1940s topdresser (restored)
- de Havilland Mosquito FB.40 Bankstown de Havilland Australia factory 1946. RAAF A52-19. Modified to T43 serial number A52-1053. RNZAF 75 Sqn NZ2305 1947. Retired as farm shed prior to recovery.
- de Havilland Vampire FB.9 c/n v1043 1950s jet fighter. 1952 RAF WR202. RNZAF Tengah 1955. Instructional airframe Hobsonville INST171 until 1962 .
- Douglas DC-3 ZK-BQK 1945 airliner. National Airways Corporation. Now under restoration in the workshop hangar.
- Douglas A-4 Skyhawk NZ6206 RNZAF jet fighter. Model A-4K 14089 16 June 1970 Bu157909. First flight from the Douglas Factory at Long Beach on 11 March 1970. Arrived at Auckland aboard the helicopter carrier USS Okinawa (LPH-3) on 17 May 1970 and towed by road to Whenuapai. Test flown at Whenuapai on 25 May 1970 before being ferried to RNZAF No.75 Squadron, Ohakea. To RNZAF No.2 Squadron, Ohakea in 1985. Flown from Ohakea to storage at Woodbourne on 12 December 2002. Dismantled and trucked to MOTAT in Auckland in three major sections [Wing, front and rear fuselage]. Arrived MOTAT Thursday 27 October 2011 and reassembled in view of the public Friday 28th through Sunday 30 October 2011.
- Everson Gyrocopter 1960s
- Fletcher FU-24 ZK-CTZ 1966
- Gere Sport Biplane 1930's era homebuilt biplane, designed and built by George "Bud" Gere, who was killed in an accident before he could witness his plane's first flight.
- Grumman Avenger TBF-1 NZ2527 1943 torpedo bomber, on loan for some time to the Confederate Air Force at Dairy Flat, the aircraft was towed across the harbour bridge to Motat for a full restoration in the museum's workshop before display in the main hangar. The hydraulic system can be used to extend and retract the wings, and open and close the bomb bay doors.
- Handley Page Hastings C.3 Major components recovered include cockpit section, main and rear undercarriage units, and all four engines, of NZ5801 1952 RNZAF Military Transport. The main and rear undercarriage units are live display items which can be raised and lowered using the original hydraulic actuators.
- Hawker Hurricane 1940s fighter (replica gate guardian).
- Lockheed Model 10 Electra 10A ZK-BUT on display (painted as ZK-AFD) 1939 Airliner, and fuselage only of ZK-AFD in storage.
- Lockheed Hudson Mk III NZ2031 1941 RNZAF Patrol bomber. Retired as farm shed prior to recovery.
- Lockheed Model 18 Lodestar ZK-BVE (c/n 2020). 1939 United Airlines, USAAF 1941 BOAC, Spanish Airforce, US civil market as 1954 N9933F, converted for Agricultural topdressing, registered to Fieldair 1957. To Museum of Transport and Technology 1970. Currently in storage.
- Lockheed Ventura 1940s NZ4600 (c/n4773) was built as 41-38117 for the USAAF, but was transferred to the RAF as FD665, then finally transferred to RNZAF as NZ4600. Patrol bomber. Retired as farm shed prior to recovery. Currently in storage.
- Mignet HM.14 Pou-du-Ciel ("Flying Flea") ZM-AAA 1936 homebuilt
- Miles Gemini ZK-ANT 1947 light twin
- Miles Magister 1940s trainer, repainted from wartime camouflaged scheme to a civil scheme for display.
- North American Harvard (AT-6) NZ944 1941, display suspended in the main display hangar with flight controls able to be moved remotely as an educational display. Designated as the "Texan" by the US Forces and designated as the "Harvard" by British and Commonwealth airforces.
- Ryan STM PT-21 This aircraft was donated to the MOTAT collection on the understanding that it would be restored to airworthy condition and so the aircraft is operated by the New Zealand Warbirds Association based at Ardmore, Auckland.
- Transavia PL-12 Airtruk ZK-CVB 1966 Topdresser, on display after a full restoration after many years on display outside.
- Schneider ESG-31 Grunau Baby II (glider) ZK-GDG 1945, displayed suspended in the main display hangar.
- Short Sunderland Mk V NZ4115 1940s military maritime flying boat. Built 1946 in Sdenham and issued directly to British Overseas Airways Corporation as G-AHJR as a freighter. Returned to RAF in April 1948 as SZ584. Handed over to RNZAF 4 September 1953 becoming NZ4115 Q for Quebec. Handed to MOTAT 25 February 1967.
- Short Solent Mk IV S.45 ZK-AMO Aranui 1949–1960 TEAL flying boat
- North Tui Sports 1930s homebuilt, rebuilt from major components
- Adams man-powered plane in storage
- Flaglor Scooter in storage
- Pearse Plane, 1903 homebuilt, original engine and propeller
- Link Trainer representing an early flight simulator
- MGM-5 Corporal E rocket on display at Motat I

=== Aircraft formerly displayed at MOTAT ===
- Curtiss P-40 Kittyhawk P-40E 41-25158/NZ3009 - Airworthy. Was with Old Stick and Rudder Company in Masterton as ZK-RMH. Since 2024, now based in Australia.
- de Havilland Devon NZ1813 c/n 04396. RNZAF Communications aircraft, which had aerial photographic fittings: Assembled by De Havilland in the United Kingdom for a cost of £31,422 11 shillings. Ferried from United Kingdom to New Zealand by RNZAF crew and arrived Wigram 13 April 1953. BOC with RNZAF at Wigram on 15 April 1953. Delivered to Ohakea on 22 May 1953. With No.42 Squadron Ohakea by January 1977. Converted to instructional airframe INST216 with No.4 TTS Woodbourne on 13 October 1981. Stored at RNZAF Technical School, Woodbourne. To MOTAT 2010. On display 2012. Returned to Ohakea August 2018.
- Fairey Swordfish 1930s torpedo bomber replica, donated to Classic Flyers Museum in Tauranga, NZ
- Fieseler Fi-103 (V-1 flying bomb), now with the Air Force Museum of New Zealand in Christchurch
- Westland Wasp 1966 helicopter RNZN NZ3909, returned to the Torpedo Bay Navy Museum
- Vought F4U Corsair FGU-1 88391/NZ5648/ZK-COR – Was owned by the Old Stick and Rudder Company, Masterton. Now based in Omaka, South Island.
- Vought F4U Corsair NZ5612, under restoration with Motat before sale into private hands, now airworthy in the USA.
- Republic P-47 Thunderbolt 42-8066 Recovered from near Port Moresby, this aircraft was restored and on display at the museum for many years before donation to the Air Force Museum of New Zealand. It was under restoration to airworthy status in Australia with HARS. In 2024, it was advertised for sale as an advanced restoration project.

== Space vehicles formerly displayed at MOTAT ==
- NASA Gemini 12 capsule. Commanded by Jim Lovell and Piloted by Buzz Aldrin in 1966 was displayed for many years in the 1970s and 1980s at the Aviation Hall MOTAT 1. Was on loan from the Smithsonian Institution. The Gemini 12 Space Capsule in the "Mission Moon" exhibition at the Adler Planetarium, Chicago, IL. Was displayed with an Apollo era spacesuit carrying John Young's name.
- Corporal E Rocket Was on display at MOTAT 1 and on loan from the Smithsonian Institution.

== Railway locomotives ==
=== NZ Railways Department / NZ Government Railway steam locomotives ===
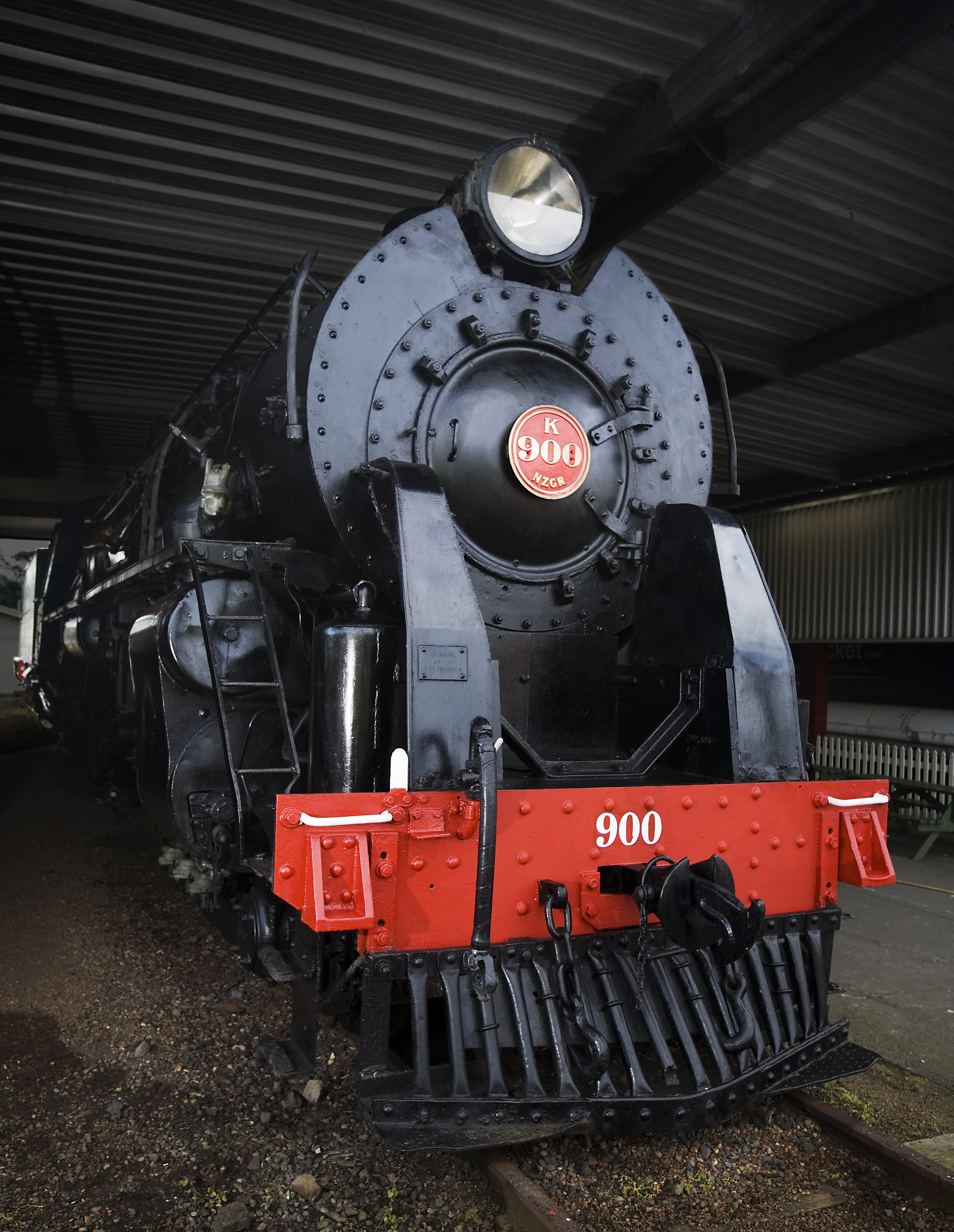
NZR K class No.900

- NZR F class No.180 0-6-0ST 1874 – Yorkshire Engine Company. Sheffield No.244. Named Meg Merrilies, a character in Guy Mannering, the novel by Sir Walter Scott published in 1815. Based on the Wanganui Branch for much of its service life and used as a shunter in the Auckland Railway Yards until 1923 when replaced by the NZR Y class locomotives. Restored and Operational as of August 2018 after a long-term restoration.
- NZR L class No.207 2-4-0T 1877 – Avonside Engine Company. No.1205. 18.5 tonnes. Operational. Operated by New Zealand Government Railways (NZGR), then by the Public Works Department (PWD) during the construction of the North Island Main Trunk (NIMT) line, and was one of the locomotives which hauled the 'Parliamentary Special' over hastily laid temporary track on the yet to be completed section from Horipito to Makatote in 1908, becoming the first train to travel the full length of the NIMT taking the Parliamentarians to the Great White Fleet American Naval visit and reception in Auckland. It currently carries its Public Works Department (PWD) number, 507, having been restored as close as practical to the condition it was in during the construction of the NIMT. Initially restored to operating condition in 1977, subsequent overhauls have been completed in 1996 and 2008. The most recent restoration was undertaken for the NIMT centenary celebrations in August 2008. This saw the locomotive used to re-enact the 'Parliamentary Special' of a century before over the very same length of line, ably assisted by fellow PWD locomotive L509 and Wab class locomotive No.794.
- NZR D class No.170 2-4-0T 1880 – Neilson and Company, Glasgow No.2563 17.3 tonnes. Stored MOTAT 2. Was loaned and on display at Helensville Station from the mid 2000s until 2024.
- NZR W^{W} class No.491 4-6-4T 1914 – NZGR Hillside Workshops No.116 51.7 tonnes, Sectionalised instructional boiler. A replacement boiler has been acquired from Steam Incorporated In storage MOTAT 2
- NZR Y class No.542 0-6-0T 1923 – Hunslet Engine Company. No.1444. 23 tonnes. Operational MOTAT 2
- NZR A^{B} class No.832 4-6-2 1925 – North British Locomotive Company. No.23190. Tender locomotive. Static MOTAT 2. Was on loan to Glenbrook Vintage Railway until August 2018.
- NZR K class No.900 4-8-4 1932 – NZGR Hutt Workshops. No.277. Tender locomotive. 140.1 tonnes. Currently under repair at MOTAT 2 as of October 2016.

=== Industrial steam locomotives ===
- Mining/Logging Locomotive 0-4-0WT 1904 Orenstein & Koppel No.1411. 1 ft 11 1/2 in (597 mm) gauge. 1904 Northern Coal Co, Hikurangi & Kiripaka. 1913 NZ Cement Co. Ltd, Limestone Island. 1916 Wilson (NZ) Portland Cement Co., Portland. 1916 Rebuilt & frames widened to 3 ft 6 in (1,067 mm) gauge. Retired 1957. Operational MOTAT 2
- Taupo Totara Timber Co No.6. 0-4-0ST 1912 – Andrew Barclay & Sons Co, Kilmarnock No.1270. To Auckland Gas Company 1925, Pukemiro Colleries 1960. Under restoration 2024.
- Kerr Stuart & Company Limited, London – 0-6-0T 1926 No.4183. 11 tonnes. Used by Kempthorne Prosser at their Westfield works. MOTAT 2.

Note: L207, Y542 & the Orenstein & Koppel were all operated until commercial retirement (1950–80s) by New Zealand Portland Cement Company near Whangarei.

=== NZ Railway diesel, petrol and electric locomotives ===
- New Zealand DA class locomotive No.1400 1955 – General Motors Corporation GM two-cycle, V-type 567c series 1425 h.p. diesel engine. Max 62 mph in covered storage MOTAT 2.
- New Zealand EB class locomotive No.25 0-4-0DE 1929 – Goodman Manufacturing Company of Chicago No.4039. Diesel Electric converted in 1953 from Battery Storage Locomotive. Undergoing overhaul at MOTAT 2.
- Diesel-Mechanical locomotive 0-4-0DMM 1936 – Hudswell Clarke and Company Leeds No.D602. Four-cylinder paxman Ricardo diesel chain drive. Briggs and Stratton auxiliary starter motor turning flywheel.
- NZR TR class No.21 0-4-0PM 1938 Drewry Car Company, Birmingham. Light shunting tractor. Engine/transmission: Originally a Parsons petrol / Wilsons 4 speed at 52 kW. Latterly a Detroit 4-71 / Allison torque converter at 78 kW/ 23 kN. Maximum speed: 33 km/h.9.4tonnes. Operational MOTAT 2.
- NZR TR class No.171 0-4-0 1960 A & G Price of Thames No.195. Light shunting tractor. Engine: Gardner 6L3, Power: 114KW, Tractive effort: 49 kN. Max Speed: 32 km/h. Transmission: SCG 4 speed. 20.3 tonnes Operational MOTAT 2 in its latter number 730.
- NZR DSA class No.223 0-6-0DM 1953 Drewry Car Company Diesel-mechanical 150 kW, 30 tonnes. Shunting loco. Operational MOTAT 2.
- Oberursel 0-4-0 – Built by the German manufacturer Motorenfabrik Oberursel, operated by The Thames District Drainage Board and then the NZ Mercury Mines limited Puhi Puhi. Top speed 8 km/h. Restored. MOTAT 2.
- Simplex 4wDM 'Yellow Peril' – Built by Motor Rail and operated by the NZR Way and Works Branch, this locomotive has been heavily modified during its working life and now bears little resemblance to its as-built condition. The locomotive still utilises its original frames and gearbox, but these have been largely disguised by later additions. It is now powered by a Chevreolet 'Blue Flame' engine.

=== Railway rolling stock and infrastructure of interest (selection) ===
A variety of carriages and wagons from the late 19th and 20th century including a sleeping car. Waitakere Station buildings and the Mount Albert Signal Box located at MOTAT 1. MOTAT's collection also includes a Fell brake wagon F210 on loan to Friends of the Fell Society at the Fell Engine Museum, located in Featherston in the Wairarapa district of the lower North Island in the foothills of the Rimataka Ranges.

Class	No.	Type	Name	Built	Builder	Status
L	507	Steam locomotive		1877	Avonside Engine Co.	In service
Y	542	Steam locomotive		1923	Hunslet Engine Co.	In service
F	180	Steam locomotive	Meg Merrilies	1880	Yorkshire Engine Co.	In service
Ab	832	Steam locomotive		1925	North British Locomotive Co.	Stored
D	170	Steam locomotive		1880	Neilson Brothers	Display
K	900	Steam locomotive		1932	NZR Hutt Workshops	Stored
WW	491	Steam locomotive		1912	NZR Hillside Workshops	Stored
		Steam locomotive		1926	Kerr Stuart and Co.	Stored
		Steam locomotive		1912	Andrew Barclay and Sons Co.	Under Restoration
		Steam locomotive		1904	Orenstein and Koppel	In Service
Tr	21	Internal combustion		1938	Drewry Car Co.	In service
Tr	171	Internal combustion		1960	A & G Price	In Service
Dsa	223	Internal combustion		1953	Drewry Car Co.	In Service
Eb	25	Internal combustion		1929	Goodman Manufacturing Co.	In Service
Da	1400	Internal combustion		1955	General Motors Corporation	Stored
		Internal combustion	Yellow Peril		Motor Rail	In service
		Internal combustion			Motorenfabrik	Overhaul

== Railway carriages ==
Lists complete carriages only. Other bodies and chassis are in collection pending restoration as well as wagons, vans and Way & Works Vehicles. On various special occasions, The Western Springs Railway can operate mixed and goods trains as well as passenger trains using some of the following carriages:

- A 302 (1884 NZR, Petone). 44 ft Gum digger car. 2 Compartment Ex Ways & Works Ea 15.
- A 851 (1904 NZR, Petone). 47 1/2 ft Suburban carriage. 1957 Pukemiro Collieries.
- A 1819 (1935 NZR, Addington) NZR 50-foot carriage NZR carriage, then Way & Works - TMS EA4441
- Aa 1068 (1908 NZR Petone). 50 ft carriage. Was on loan to McDonalds, Paraparaumu 1986–2008.
- Aa 1136 (1909 NZR, Petone). 50 ft carriage. 1909–1975 NZR service
- Aa 1480 (1916 NZR, Otahuhu). 50 ft carriage. 1916–1917 Dining car. 1917–1918 sleeper car. 1918 onward Way & Works bunk car & diner as Ea 1979 – (TMS EA 88)
- Af 970 (1907 NZR, Newmarket). 47 1/2 ft carriage. 1907–1944 Car – A 970 1944–1980c. Carvan – Af 970 (OTH/1939) 1980c MOTAT.
- AL 50147 (1934 NZR, Otahuhu) Previously Al 1816. NZR 50-foot carriage. 1934–1970 Car A 1816 1970–1970s Carvan Al 1816 1970s. Carvan AL50147.
- D 490 (1879 Builder not known) 21 1/2 ft carriage
- F 10 (1883 Builder not known) 20 ft carriage. 1883–1950 NZR service – F10 1950–1961 Ballast Plough – Ep 2501. 1961–2002 Jack Ryder, Auckland. 2002 MOTAT.
- F 247 (1901 NZR, East town) 30 ft carriage.

== Trams ==
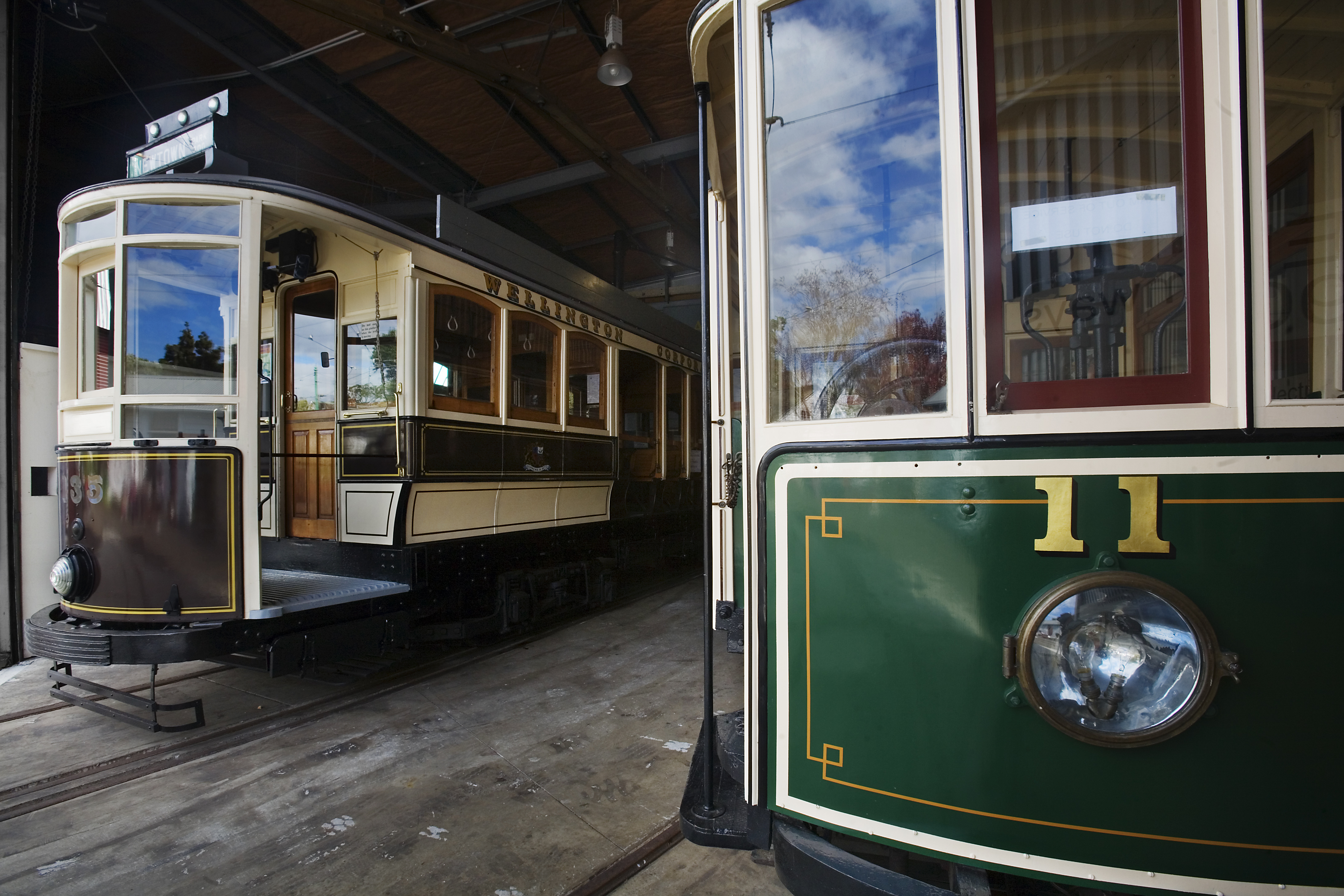
1921 Wellington tram No.135 and 1902 Auckland tram No.11

Auckland Trams Horse (1884–1902) Electric (1902–1956):

- No.11 1902 Brush Electrical Engineering Co. Bogie saloon combination. In service.
- No.17 1902 Brush Electrical Engineering Co. Bogie double-decker. Stored
- No.44 1906 Auckland Electric Tramways Co. Open fronted, Single truck, Saloon. Operational
- No.89 1909 DSC & Cousins & Cousins. 52-seat bogie saloon. Stored
- No.147 1913 DSC & Cousins & Cousins. 52-seat bogie saloon. Stored
- No.203 1926 DSC & Cousins & Cousins. 52-seat Art Deco car steel-sided car. Stored
- No.248 1938 Auckland Transport Board's Royal Oak Workshops. Electro Magnetic Braking Co. (EMB) L5 bogied Streamliner. Operational.
- No.253 1940 Auckland Transport Board's Royal Oak Workshops. EMB L5 bogied Streamliner. Stored.

Wellington Trams Steam (1878–1882) Horse (1882–1904) Electric (1904–1964):

- No.47 1906 Rouse & Black, Wellington. Bogie, open-top double-decker. Operational.
- No.135 1921 Wellington City Corporation Tramways. Bogie Saloon. Operational
- No.252 1940 Wellington City Corporation Tramways. Fiducia one-man safety car. Stored
- No.257 1950 Wellington City Transport Department. Fiducia one-man safety car. Operational
- No.301 1911 Wellington City Corporation Tramways. Single-truck freight tram. Operable, but Stored

Wanganui Trams (1908–1950):

- No.10 1912 Boon & Co, Christchurch. Single truck California Combination Car. Stored
- No.21 1921 Boon & Co, Christchurch. Toastrack electric tram trailer. Under restoration.
- No.100 1891 Baldwin Locomotive Works, Philadelphia. Makers number 11885. 11-inch cylinders, former Sydney Steam Motor. Imported 1910 and used for the construction of the Castlecliff tramline which opened in 1912. Pressed back into service in 1921 when there was a major power failure for six months. Mothballed and returned to service for the tramway closure parades in September 1950. Sold to Blake Engineering, resold to a Sydney group who weren't able to fund raise the shipping costs. Resold to two members of the Old Time Transport and Preservation league. Trucked to Auckland in 1962 and stored. Restored in the mid-1970s and completed in 1977. New boiler constructed 1983–1996. Overhauled 2009–2011, And again in 2019–2020. Operational.

Napier Tramway Remnants (1913–1931): Permanently closed by the Hawkes Bay / Napier earthquake 3 February 1931.

- 3 ft-6in gauge Brush 21E truck is the sole surviving tram remnant from an unspecified Napier tram. The tram bodies were sold off and the truck was fortunately used as the chassis and wheels for a railway shunter, before being donated in the early 1980s by Robert Holt and Sons' sawmill at Otane, a northern industrial suburb of Napier. The only piece of fixed infrastructure to survive is the overhead tram shed toughing, which is now installed in the Western Springs Tramway Coachwork shop.

Mornington Cable Trams (1883–1957):

- No.4 (later Dunedin City Tramways No.107) 1883 Jones Car Co, New York. Cable Car trailer. Stored.

Melbourne Trams Cable (1885–1940) Electric (1906–present):

- No.321 1925 Holden Bros, Adelaide. W2 class, bogie drop centre. Operational
- No.893 1944 Melbourne & Metropolitan Tramways Board SW6 class, bogie drop centre. Operational.
- No.906 1945 Melbourne & Metropolitan Tramways Board SW6 class, bogie drop centre. Operational.
- No.1032 1956 Ansair / Melbourne & Metropolitan Tramways Board W7 class, bogie drop centre. Stored

Sydney Trams (1879–1961) New South Wales Government Tramways:

- No.100 1891 Steam Motor – NSWGT 1891–1908, Back up locomotive for Saywell Estates Tramway from The Bay-street Rockdale station on the Illawarra Railway, passed down Bay Street to and along Lady Robinson's Beach, later Brighton-Le-Sands. Exported to Wanganui in 1910. Refer Wanganui Trams in section above.

=== Trams formerly operated or displayed at MOTAT ===
Auckland trams

- No.91 1909 DSC & Cousins & Cousins. 52-seat bogie saloon. Acquired for parts for 89 & 147, but became dining room for Cropper House Restaurant – MOTAT 1. At MOTAT 2000–2017. Donated to the Auckland Electric Tramway Trust and now in storage.

Wellington Tram

- No.244 Wellington City Corporation Tramways Stored complete MOTAT 1964–2021. Donated to Wellington Tramway Museum in 2021

Melbourne trams

- No.3 1920 Essanne Company, Bath, England. Rail Grinder with Rotating grinding stones. Order for and used in Sydney and Newcastle as NSWGT No.2 from 1920 before being sold to Melbourne in about 1958 and renumbered M&MTB No.3. Used in Melbourne 1958 until retired in 1971, when purchased by the Sydney Tramway Museum. On Loan from the Sydney Tramway Museum from 2011 to 2017, when returned to Sydney.

Sydney Trams

- No.1808 1934 Clyde Engineering, Sydney R class, bogie drop centre. Retired 1960. Accommodation Tobacco Farm Ashcroft NSW 1961–1984. On loan from the Sydney Tramway Museum 2009–2017. Now operated by Welcome Aboard Limited as the Christchurch Tramway.

== Petrol / diesel buses ==
A brief history of omnibuses in Auckland

Auckland has had a long association with the bus. Horse buses appeared in the mid to late 19th century in competition with the Horse Tramway. Evolving with the invention of the steam, petrol and later diesel engines. The increasingly reliable vehicles served the outlining and semi-rural areas of Auckland not already served by the Tramways from the 1920s. Without the need for expensive fixed infrastructure such as tracks and overhead wires, the flexibility of the road going buses has been their ultimate success.

Operator – North Shore Transport:

- No.4 1924 White Motor Company. 4-cylinder side-valve petrol engine, wooden-bodied 23-seat omnibus. Built by Gilmore, Joel & Williams, Auckland for Alf Smith, The United Service Motor-Omnibus Co Limited, Devonport. To NST sometime after 1924. then to Rangitoto Scenic Tours after 1938.
- No.72 1949 Daimler Half Cab, 5 cylinders Gardner 5LW engine, wooden-framed, 33-seat omnibus, built by NST. One of 6 in fleet. In service with NST 1949–1968. Stored.
- No.80 (1955) Seddon Half Cab. Perkins diesel engine, wooden-framed, 33-seat omnibus, built by NST. One of 3 in fleet. In service with NST 1955–1968. Stored.

Operator's – Auckland Transport Board – 1929–1964 and Auckland Regional Authority – 1964-Early 1990s

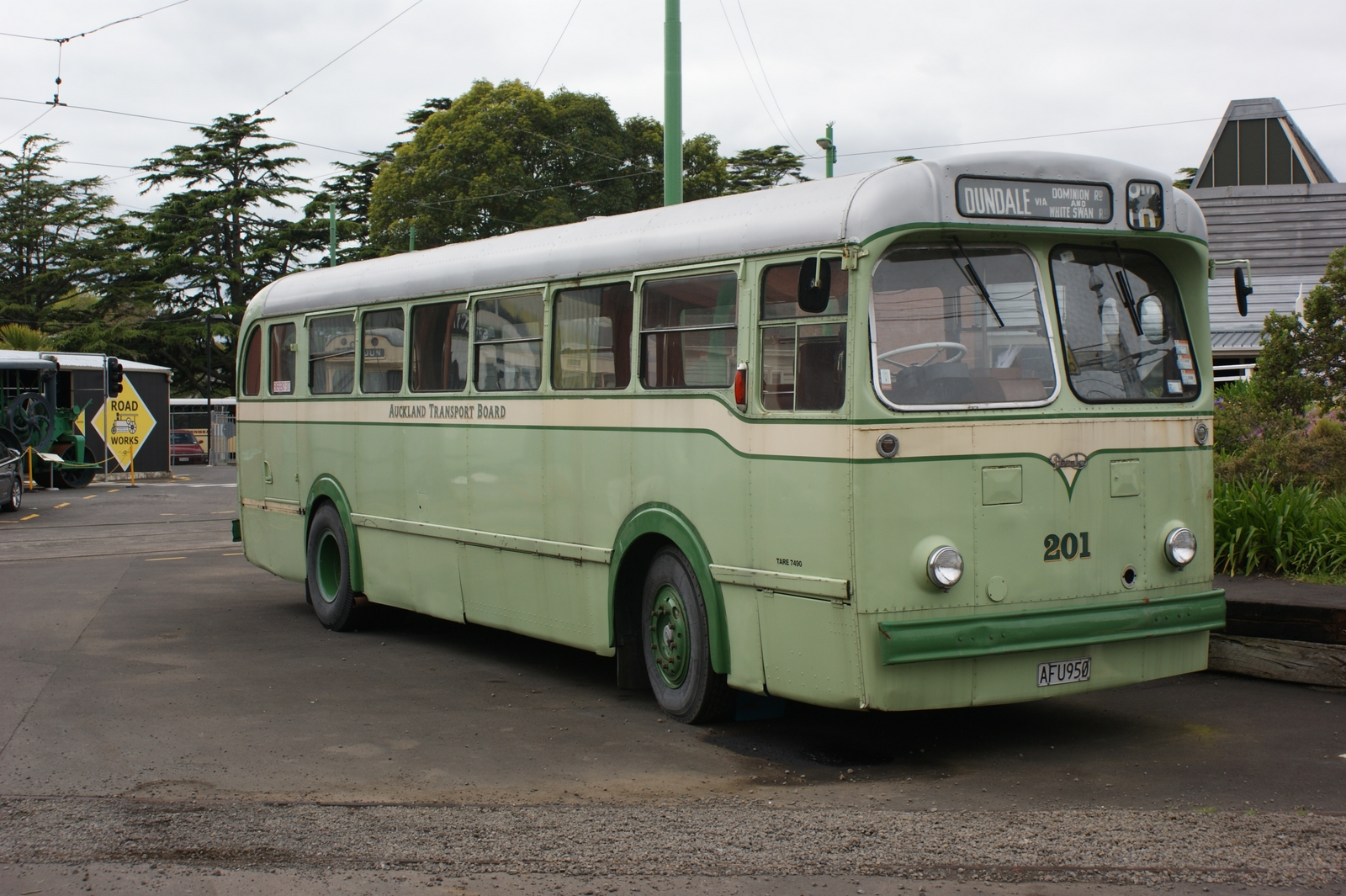
1953 Daimler Freeline, 44-seat under-floor diesel bus

- No.201 1953 Daimler Freeline, 44-seat under-floor diesel bus. Bodywork by Saunders-Roe in England. Exhibited at the 1953 Commercial Vehicle Show in Leeds, before being exported to NZ. One of 160 in ATB fleet. In service with ATB/ARA 1953–1983. Restored and operable.
- No.301 1954 Bedford SB. Petrol engine, 35-seat lightweight wooden body for Grafton Bridge services. One of 12 in the ATB fleet. In service with ATB/ARA until 1977. Stored
- No.464 1953 Leyland Royal Tiger PSU, 44-seat under-floor diesel-engine bus. Saunders Roe kitset body. One of 50 in the ATB fleet. In service with ATB/ARA 1953–1983.
- No.1603 1978 MAN SL200 No.1603. Rear engine diesel bus. 1981 Hawke Coachwork built steel Framed body. 45 Seater. In service 1982 – 2008. One of 88 built. In Service with ARA, The Yellow Bus Company and Stagecoach 1982 – 2008.

Operator New Zealand Railways Road Services

- No.3592 1964 Bedford SB, 35-seat bus built by New Zealand Motor Bodies. One of the most numerous bus designs to ever be used in NZ. In service with the NZRRS until the early 1980s. Then the NZ Prison Service, then finally McLouds Helensville, School bus operator until 2002.

Formerly in the MOTAT Collection

- No.14 1946 Bedford OWB, petrol engine, wooden-bodied 33-seat omnibus, built by the ATB for Tramway Feeder and Hospitals bus services. One of 9 OWB and 34 OB buses in ATB fleet. In service with ATB 1946–1958. Sold to Green Line Buses Avondale, then a School Bus in Huntly. Returned to its former owner 2017.
- No.359 1953 AEC Regal IV, 44-seat under-floor diesel-engine bus, New Zealand Motor Bodies metal-framed bus. One of 13 buses in ATB fleet built for St. Heliers / Tamaki Drive Services. In service with the ATB/ARA 1953–1969, then the NST 1969–1971 and back to the ARA 1971–1977. Given to the Omnibus Society of New Zealand 2018.
- No.1527 1978 Mercedes-Benz O305 diesel under-floor diesel bus. New Zealand Motor Bodies built body One of 300 in fleet of buses which replaced the Trolleybuses and many older petrol and diesel buses from the Auckland Regional Authority fleet. In Service with ARA, ARC (Auckland Regional Council), then The Yellow Bus Company after deregulation and Stagecoach. In service 1978 – 1 August 2005. Given to the Omnibus Society of New Zealand 2018.

== Trolleybuses ==
A brief history of Trolleybuses in Auckland

Auckland’s first trolleybuses

In 1938, the Farmers Trading Company department store began operating four trolleybuses on a one kilometre long loop from Farmers in Hobson Street, down Victoria Street, turning into Queen Street and finally traversing steep Wyndham Street back to Farmers. These buses were operated until 1967, when an experimental overhaul of No 3 concluded it uneconomic to overhaul the remainder of the fleet. The Farmers Free Bus service continued operating with newer trolleybuses.

The Tramway replacement programme

The tramway replacement programme started in September 1949 with the conversion of the Herne Bay tram route to trolleybus operation and concluded with the closure of the Auckland tramway system 29 December 1956. The trolleybus routes expanded until 1960 with the conversion to trolleybus operation of the Onehunga route from diesel buses. At its height the system covered 86 kilometres using 133 buses.

The Queen Street Shuttle buses were distinct with a red band painted around the bus and permanently sign written with route information. They also had an increased standee capacity, achieved by reducing one side of the aisle to single seats. They operated with conductors until fitted with fare honesty boxes until 1972. To reduce standing time at bus stops, entry and alighting were permitted at both front and rear doors. The service was designed for speedy passage of passengers between the Beach Road railway station, Queen Street and the Karangahape Road department stores Rendalls and George Courts.

Decline and closure

Unfortunately the trolleybus system used the majority of the old tramway electrical reticulation system which dated from 1902 and in 1980 was approaching 80 years of age. Trolleybuses routes began being closed in 1977 in favour of diesel buses. On 28 September 1980 the ceremonial last trolleybus ran and the Auckland trolleybus system closed. A new generation trolleybus system was proposed in the early 1980s, but a change in policy within the Auckland Regional Authority saw the new-generation trolley bus system abandoned in 1981, despite 20 new Volvo B10M chassis with Ansaldo electrical equipment and Robosio overhead being ordered and delivered and sections of overhead installed. The new buses were sold to Wellington City Transport and completed to their specifications. More recently these trolleybuses were sold and have been converted to diesel buses.

Farmers Trading Company trolleybuses

- No.1/No.3 1938 Leyland trolleybus chassis. 37-seat wooden-bodied trolleybuses built by DSC & Cousins & Cousins. Eight bodies built, the first four destroyed by fire in the DSC & Cousins premises, the second four completed by DCS Cousins at the ATB Royal Oak Workshops. Electrical equipment supplied by Metropolitan-Vickers. Two of 4 buses in ATB/ATA fleet. Operated by the ATB on behalf of Farmers Trading Company. Later being sold to ATB. In service with the ATB/ARA 1938–1967.

Suburban trolleybuses:

- No.50 1953 "BUTs". BUT 9711T chassis. 43-seat Metropolitan-Cammell Carriage & Wagon Company kitset body. Electrical equipment by Metropolitan-Vickers. One of 55 in ATB/ARA fleet. In service 1956–1977. Restored, operable and on display MOTAT 1.
- No.85 1956 "SAROs or Tanks". BUT RETB/1 chassis. 45-seat Saunders-Roe kitset body. Electrical equipment by British Thomson-Houston. In service 1956–1977. One of 40 buses in ATB/ARA fleet. On display MOTAT 1.
- No.120 1958 "Park Royal Mainline (Suburban)" BUT RETB/1 chassis. 44-seat Park Royal Kitset body. Electrical equipment by British Thomson-Houston. In service 1958–1980. 34 buses in ATB/ARA fleet. No.120 is the only surviving suburban 44-seat Park Royal in the suburban configuration and had been loaned to Ian Little's Foxton Trolley Bus Museum for many years

Railway station – Queen Street – Karangahape Road Shuttle "Red band" trolley buses:

- No's 108 and 115 1958 "Queen Street Shuttle Park Royals" British United Traction (Leyland) built chassis. 38-seat Park Royal Kitset body. Electrical equipment by British Thomson-Houston. In service 1958–1980. 34 buses in ATB/ARA fleet. No.115 was built as a Mainline (Suburban) Park Royal but very late in its career it was converted from a 44-seat to a 38-seat Queen Street Shuttle trolleybus, following another trolleybus being written off. This involved increasing the standee capacity by reducing the seated capacity with a two–one seating on either side of the aisle. No.115 was the ceremonial last trolleybus to run in Auckland, on Sunday 28 September 1980. Both trolleybuses are currently in storage. Trolleybus 109 was also acquired in 2009 from the Omnibus Society and is in the process of being dismantled for parts, so not an accessioned artefact.

Legend: ATB = Auckland Transport Board – 1929–1964. ARA = Auckland Regional Authority – 1964–1993. AEC = Associated Equipment Company of England. Vehicle manufacturer. BUT = British United Traction. Electrical equipment manufacturer. BTH = British Thomson-Houston. Electrical equipment manufacturer. NST = North Shore Transport. NZRRS = New Zealand Railways Road Services OWB = Official designation for Bedford O series bus chassis built during World War 2. SARO = Saunders-Roe. Bus body manufacturer.
