= Trolleybuses in Wellington =

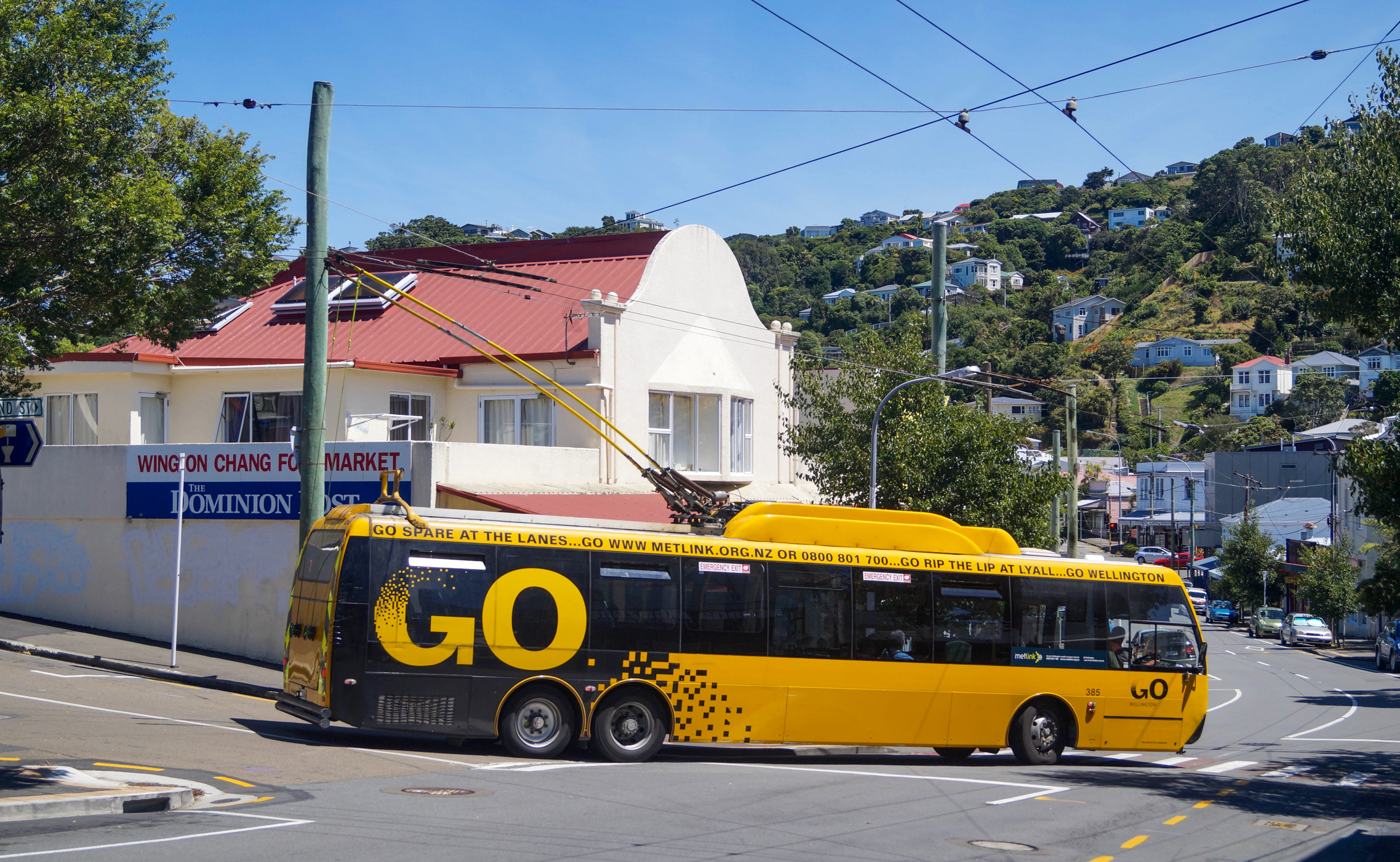
- A GO Wellington DesignLine trolleybus in February 2016

Operation
- Locale: Wellington, New Zealand

Statistics
First era: 1924–1932
- Status: Closed
- Routes: 1
- Operator: Wellington City Transport
- Electrification: V DC parallel overhead lines
Second era: 1949–2017
- Status: Closed
- Routes: 9
- Operators: Wellington City Transport (1949–1992); Stagecoach Wellington (1992–2005); NZ Bus (2005–2017)
- Electrification: 550 V DC parallel overhead lines
- Depot: Kilbirnie
- Stock: 60 (October 2017)
- Route length: 50 km (31 mi) (maximum)
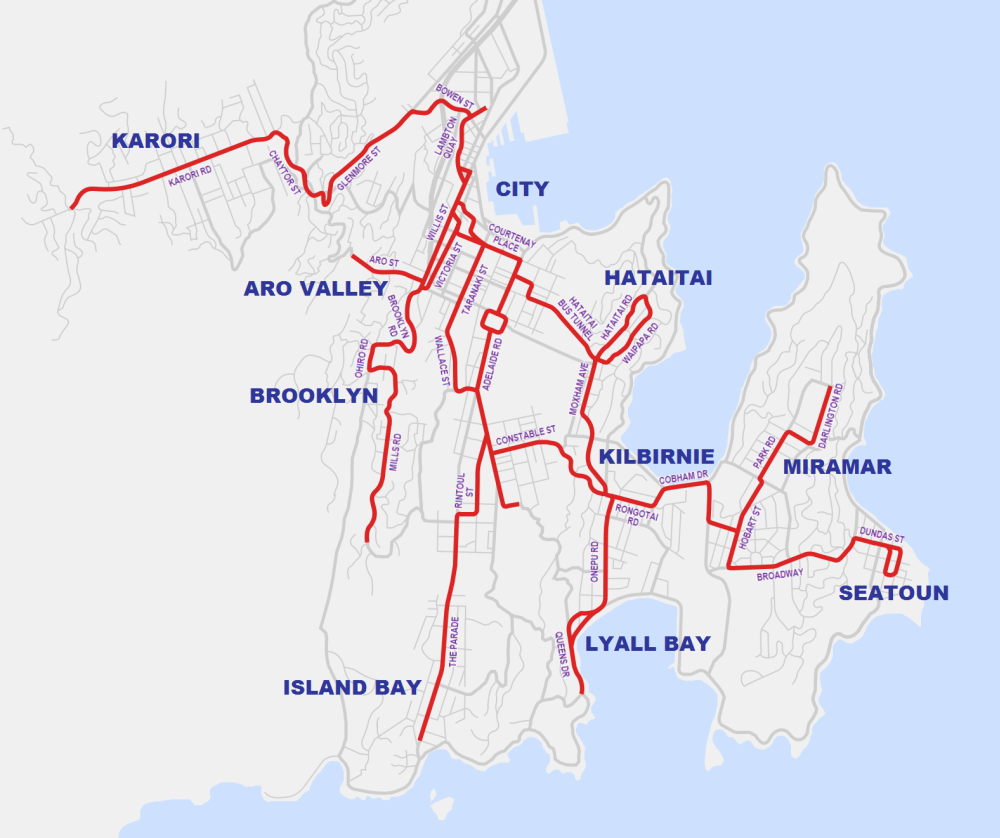
- Website: http://www.gowellingtonbus.co.nz/ GO Wellington

Trolleybuses in Wellington were part of the Wellington public transport system from 1924 until 1932 and again from 1949 until 2017. It was the last trolleybus system operating commercially in Oceania and the last major system operating in a country where traffic keeps to the left side of the road.

== History ==
=== First era ===
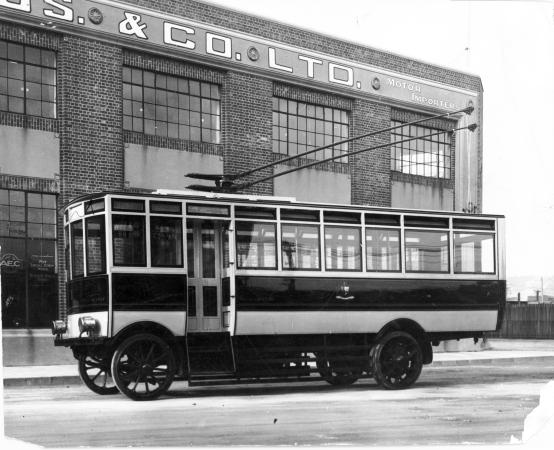
Wellington's first trolleybus, an AEC 602 in November 1924

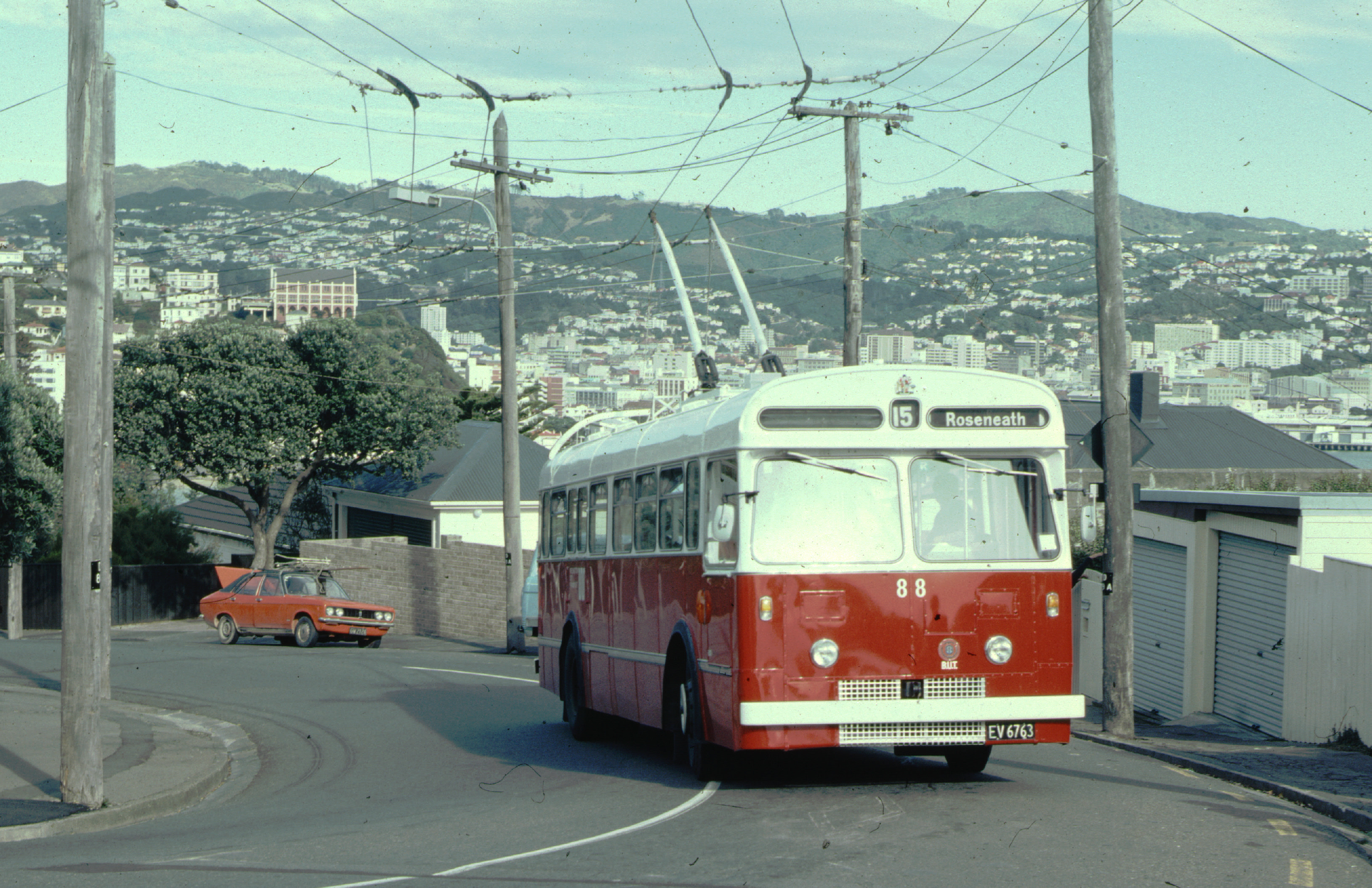
A BUT trolleybus in service on the Roseneath route in 1982

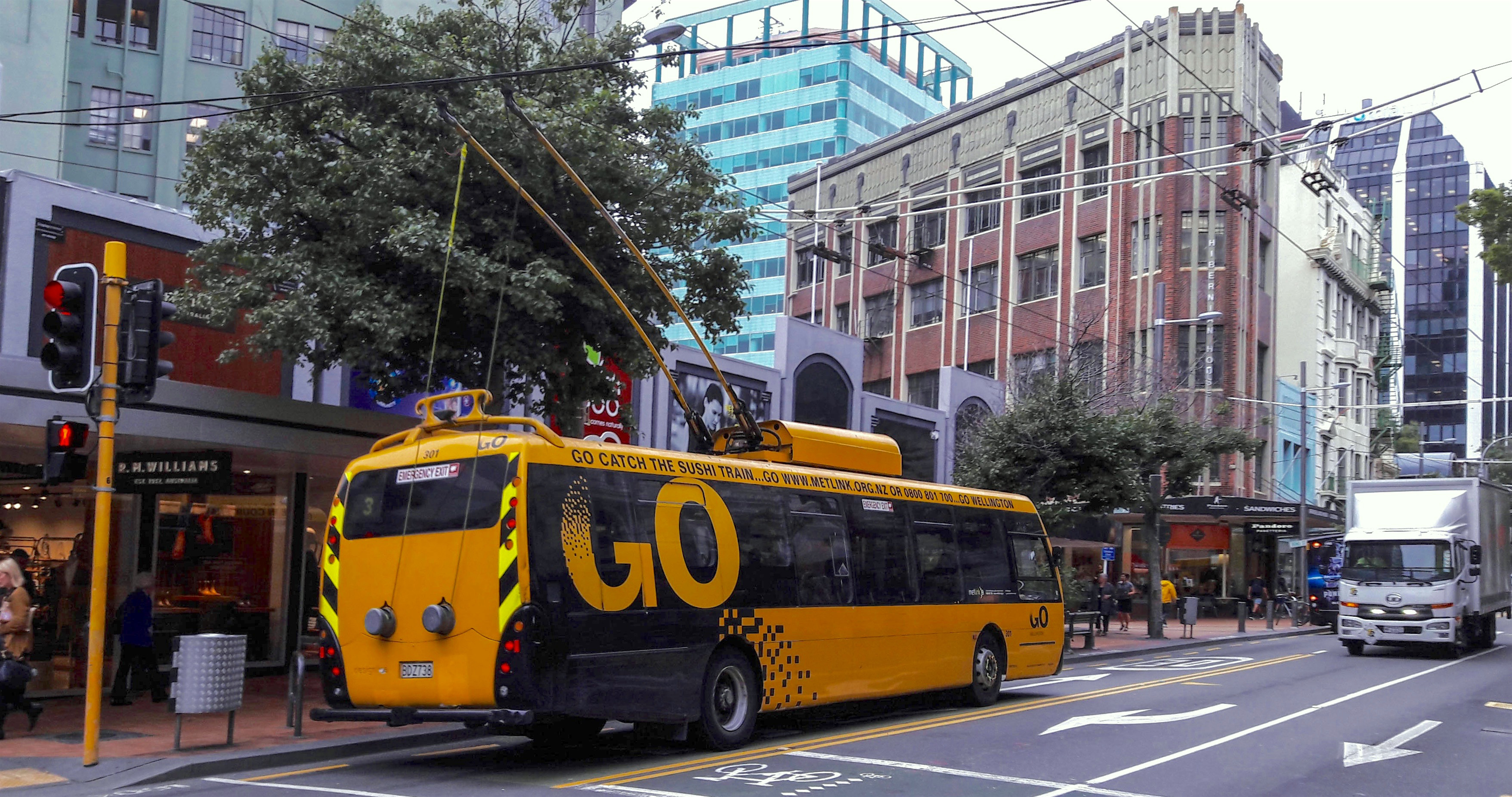
A DesignLine trolleybus in the city centre in 2017

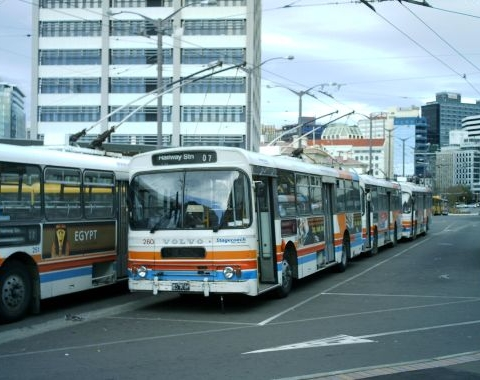
Volvo B58 trolleybuses at Wellington station in May 2007

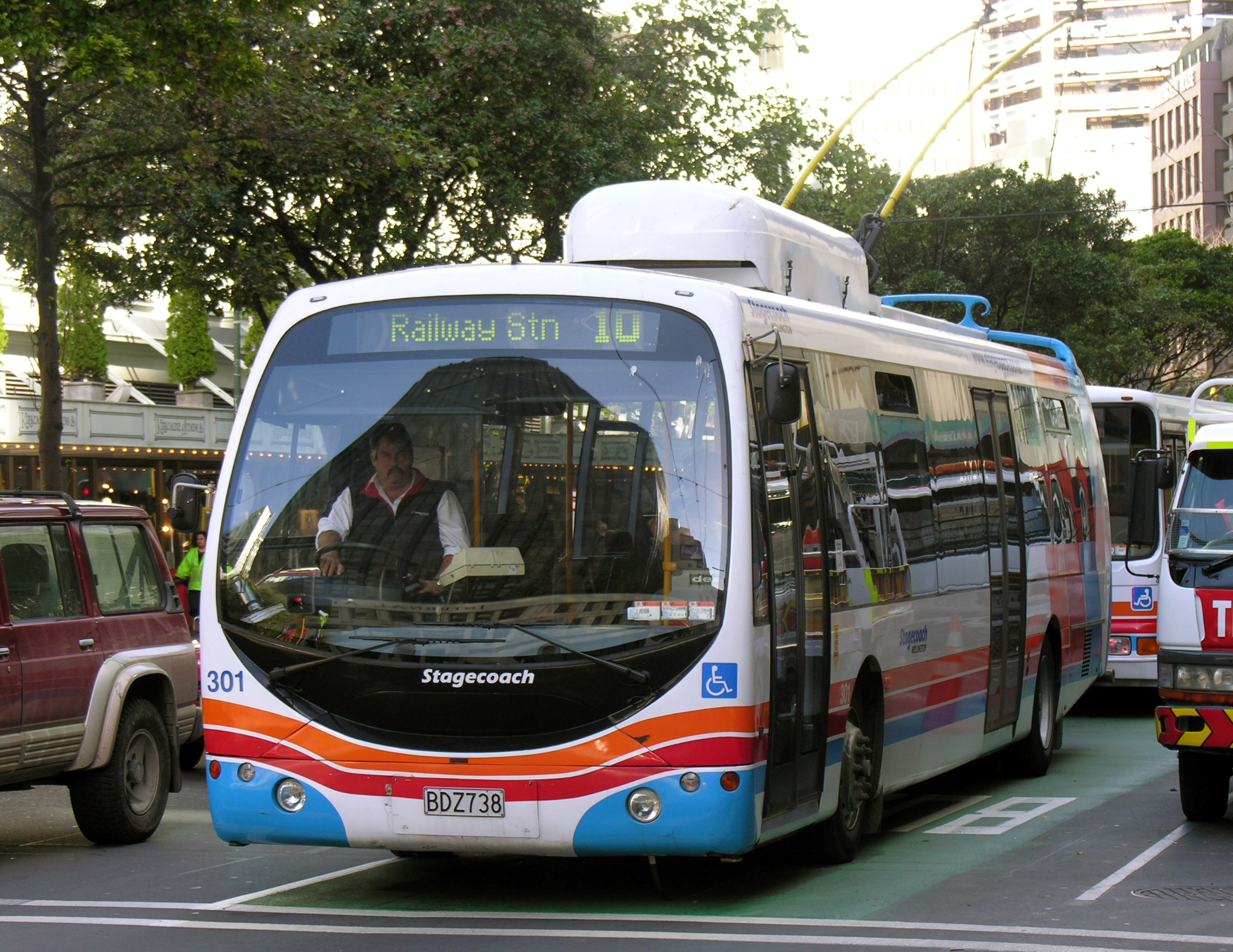
A prototype DesignLine trolleybus 301 in its original Stagecoach livery in June 2005

On 29 September 1924 the first trolleybus route was inaugurated with a single AEC 602 trolleybus running from Thorndon along Hutt Road to Kaiwharawhara (then known as Kaiwarra).

A trolleybus was chosen over an extension to the Wellington tramway system because a large water main on the route precluded tram track construction. Patronage was not very high, and as bus services in the area were introduced and expanded in the years following, patronage declined further and the service was withdrawn on 30 May 1932.

=== Second era ===
A second and more extensive network was approved in 1945, when it was decided to gradually replace trams with trolleybuses, preferred for being more manoeuvrable and more modern. Trolleybuses were also preferred over diesel or petrol buses due to better traction on steep slopes. The first route opened on 20 June 1949 to Roseneath continuing beyond the Oriental Parade tram terminus. It was extended to Hataitai School in October 1949. The next route opened to Aotea Quay to serve a new Social Security Department building. It ceased ten years later when that office moved, and was notable as the only trolleybus terminus in New Zealand where trolleybuses reversed to turn round.

Tram conversion started in 1951 with the opening of the route to Wadestown, followed by Karori (1954), Northland (1956), Seatoun and Miramar (1958), Aro Street and Brooklyn, the latter extended beyond the tram terminus to Mornington (1960), Lyall Bay (1963) and Island Bay (1964). The building of Wellington Airport across the Rongotai isthmus required a deviation from the Coutts Street route that the trams had taken. The short Northland route closed in 1972. As late as 1984, a route was converted from diesel to electric operation, with the network reaching its maximum extent at around 50 kilometres. In 1990 the Wadestown to Roseneath route closed.

Operation of the system was privatised in 1992, when the Wellington City Council sold its transport operations to Stagecoach. The council retained ownership of the system's infrastructure with Stagecoach maintaining it under contract. In November 2005, the trolleybus network was included in the sale of Stagecoach's New Zealand operations to Infratil.

The network was threatened with closure over the years, mainly on grounds of cost. In 2014, the Greater Wellington Regional Council recommended closure of the entire system. Public consultations on the proposal were followed by a final decision to close the entire system by 2017. The published reasons included cost of infrastructure maintenance and upgrading, inflexibility of a wire linked network, plus slower speeds and less reliability than diesel buses. The Hataitai loop was replaced by diesel buses in October 2015.

The closure was questioned after the results of the 2017 New Zealand general election. The Labour Party had gained victory by entering into a coalition with the Green Party and New Zealand First, both of the latter who were on record as saying that they wanted to upgrade and maintain trolleybus services in Wellington. However, new transport minister Phil Twyford stated that the government would not step in to save the network. Twyford claimed that the costs of paying out the demolition contracts would be far too high, which came under heavy criticism from Wellington residents and council members in support of the trolleys. On 31 October 2017 the system closed. Work to remove the infrastructure began in October 2017 with all works scheduled for completion by late-2018.

== Operations ==
Trolleybuses were an integral part of the Wellington bus service. In the system's last years, they were operated by NZ Bus under the GO Wellington brand. They served the southern, western, and eastern parts of Wellington, using overhead wires owned by Wellington Cable Car Limited, a subsidiary of Wellington City Council and powered at 550 volts DC. The steepest grade on the system was 1 in 10.

=== Routes ===
The following routes were operated:

Route	From	To	Notes
1	Wellington railway station	Island Bay	
2	Wellington railway station	Miramar	
3	Karori Park	Lyall Bay	
5	Wellington railway station	Hataitai	converted to diesel buses October 2015
6	Wellington railway station	Lyall Bay	
7	Wellington railway station	Kingston	
9	Wellington railway station	Aro Street	
10	Wellington railway station	Wellington Zoo	
11	Wellington railway station	Seatoun	

Routes operated all day every day, except route 6 (Monday-Friday peak hours only), 9 and 10 (Monday-Friday only, not evenings). There were insufficient trolleybuses to operate all journeys on these routes, and diesel buses operated daily. In the system's last years, some journeys on route 6 ran beyond the wires to Molesworth Street, and were operated by diesel buses, evening services were usually operated by diesel buses, and trolleybuses did not run at the weekend.

=== Route descriptions ===
The main city-centre corridor was along the Golden Mile from Wellington railway station (terminus of all routes except the 3) via Lambton Quay and Willis Street (served by all routes) to Courtenay Place (served by routes 1, 2, 3, and 6).

To the west, route 3 traveled to Karori Park via Glenmore Street and the Karori Tunnel, connecting into the Golden Mile south of the railway station.

To the south-west, routes 7 and 9 ran along Willis Street (northbound), Victoria Street (southbound) before splitting – the 7 climbed the hill southwards to Brooklyn, Mornington and Kingston, the 9 ran west up the Aro Valley.

To the south, four routes ran to Newtown (1 and 3 via the Basin Reserve, 10 and 11 via Taranaki Street), with the 1 continuing south to Island Bay, the 10 terminating at Wellington Zoo, and the 3 and 11 turning east to Kilbirnie, where they met routes 2 and 6 via the bus tunnel and Hataitai. From Kilbirnie, routes 2 and 11 ran east to Hobart Street, where the 2 headed north to Miramar, and the 11 continued east to Seatoun; routes 3 and 6 ran south to Lyall Bay.

== Vehicles ==
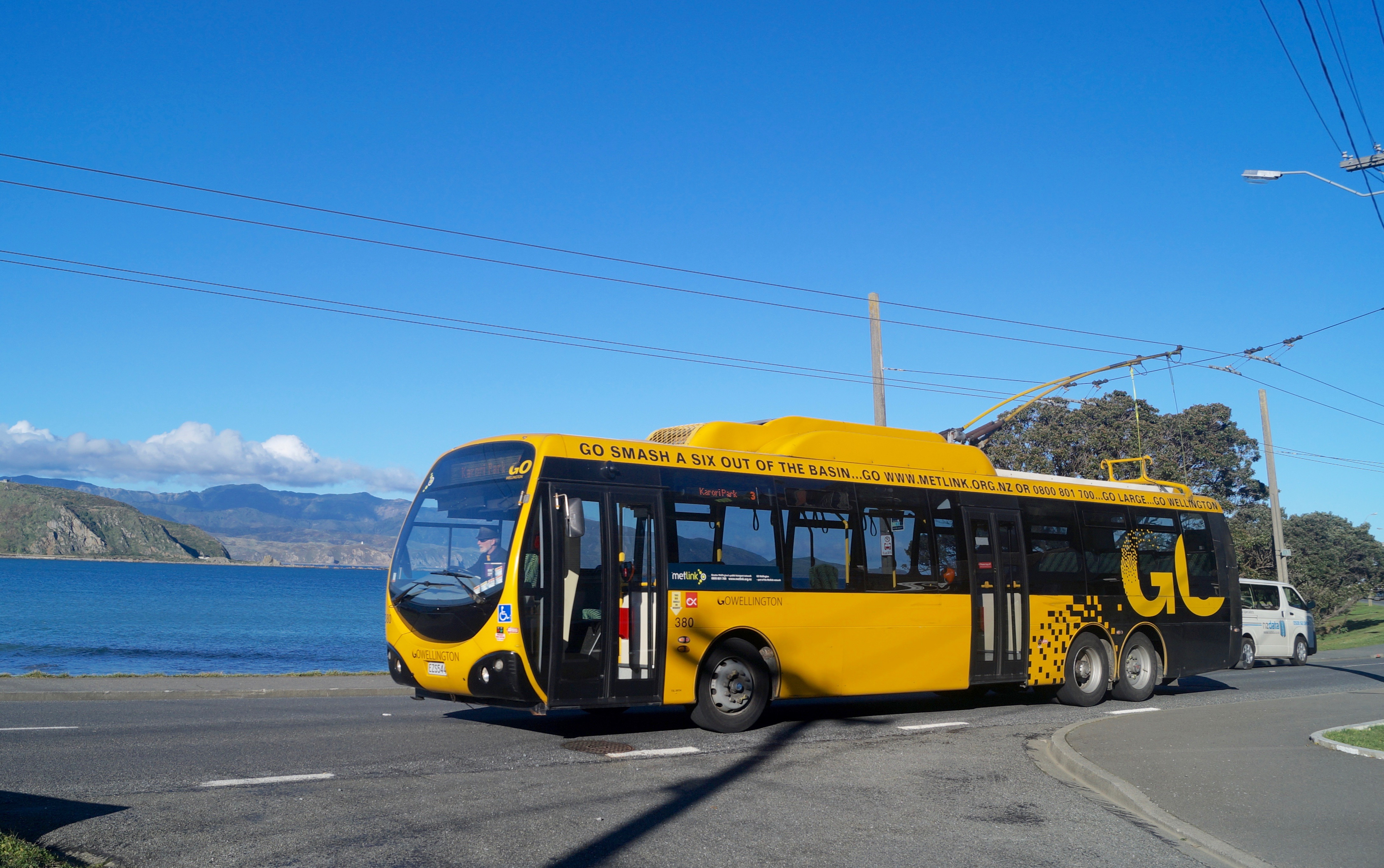
A 2009-built DesignLine trolleybus in GO Wellington livery next to Lyall Bay on route 3 in July 2015

The initial service from 1924 until 1932 was operated by an AEC 602.

For the expanded network, 10 Crossley Empires were purchased in 1949. These were followed by BUT RETB/1s bodied by Commonwealth Engineering (38), Metro Cammell Weymann (52) and New Zealand Motor Bodies (19) between 1951 and 1964, the last 38 chassis being manufactured under subcontract by Scammell. Sixty-eight Hawke Coachwork and Coachwork International Volvo B58s were delivered between 1981 and 1986, with 20 unused New Zealand Motor Bodies bodied Volvo B10Ms purchased from the Auckland Regional Authority after it cancelled plans to renew its network. The B10Ms were later converted to diesel buses.

A prototype DesignLine trolleybus was delivered in March 2003 followed by another two in May 2005. Delivery of the 57-vehicle production series began in December 2007 and finished in September 2009. Using some components from the Volvos, they had a greater passenger capacity than previous trolleybuses, were low-floor and incorporated other improvements. They were able to operate for short distances off-wire from batteries. The electrical equipment was provided by Eletra Industrial of Brazil.

In April 2016, NZ Bus announced that it would repower several buses, including all of its trolleybuses, with Wrightspeed gas-turbine hybrid powertrains. However this was not completed before the trolleybuses were withdrawn.

Fleet numbers	Quantity	Chassis	Axles	Body	Entered service
1	1	AEC 602	2	DSC & Cousins	1924
1–10	10	Crossley Empire	2	Wellington City Council	1949–50
11–48	38	BUT RETB/1	2	Commonwealth Engineering	1951–56
49–81	33	BUT RETB/1	2	Metro Cammell Weymann	1958–59
82–100	19	BUT RETB/1 ^{†}	2	Metro Cammell Weymann	1964
101–119	19	BUT RETB/1 ^{†}	2	New Zealand Motor Bodies	1964
120–139	20	Volvo B10M	2	New Zealand Motor Bodies	1983
201–233	33	Volvo B58	2	Hawke Coachwork	1981
234–268	35	Volvo B58	2	Coachwork International	1984–86
301–303	3	DesignLine	2	DesignLine	2003–05
331–387	57	DesignLine	3	DesignLine	2007–09

^† manufactured under subcontract by Scammell

Vehicles were initially painted silver, until an all red livery was adopted in 1958. Stagecoach applied its corporate white with orange and blue stripes livery.

=== Preservation ===
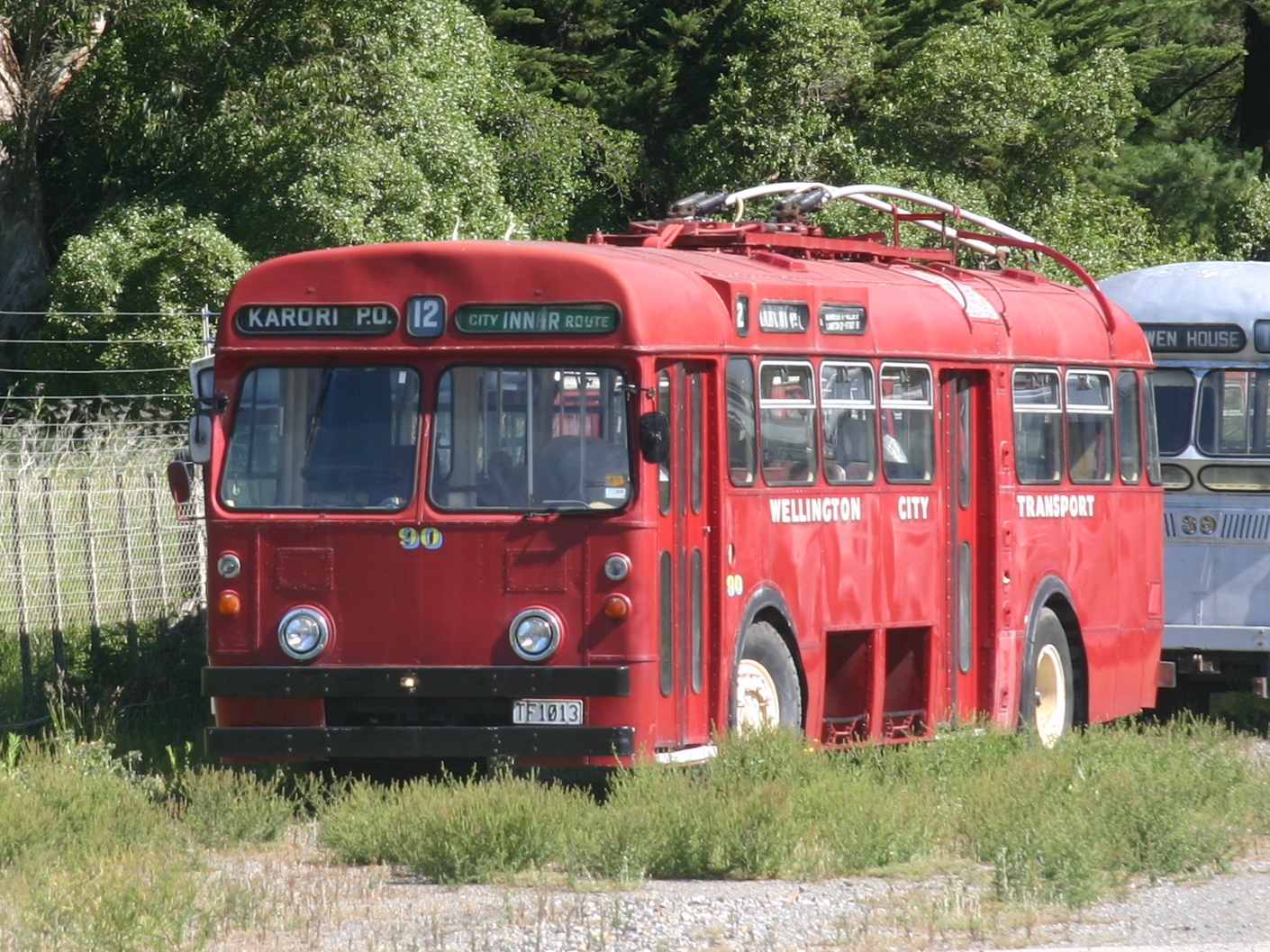
Preserved BUT RETB/1 trolleybus 90 in December 2012

Several former Wellington trolleybuses have been preserved:

- the Foxton Trolley Bus Museum has BUTs 90 and 119 and Volvo 268
- the Tramway Historical Society, Christchurch have BUT 103 and Volvo 258
- the Wellington Tramway Museum has BUT 91
- The Trolleybus Museum at Sandtoft repatriated BUT 82 to England in 2012 and returned it to operational condition

== See also ==
- Transport in New Zealand
- List of trolleybus systems
