= North Tui Sports =

Tui Sports
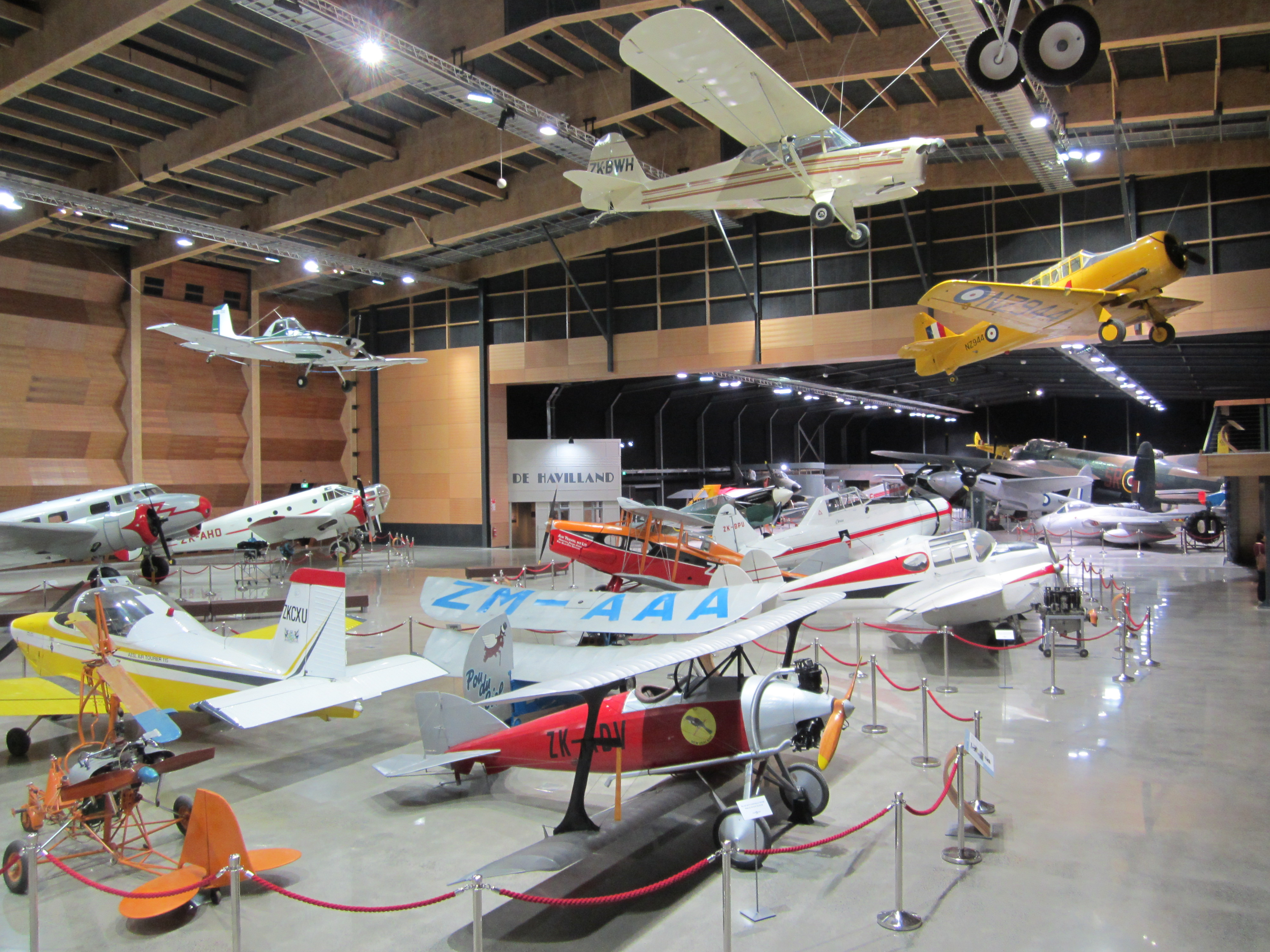

General information
- Type: REQUIRED
- National origin: New Zealand
- Manufacturer: Fred North
- Status: under restoration / replication
- Number built: 1

History
- First flight: 4 January 1934

The Tui Sports is a New Zealand light aircraft of the 1930s, named after the Tūī bird. It is small single seat aerobatic single bay biplane of fabric covered wooden construction, with a streamlined circular section fuselage, powered by a Szekely 3 cylinder engine.

The Tui Sports was built by Fred North at Dannevirke and first flown by Allan McGruer from a field near Whenuapai on 4 January 1934.

== History ==
Plans for the plane are dated to 5 May 1931. Originally intended as a one-off construction, its success encouraged Fred North and the Dominion Aircraft Company to prepare for production in Auckland. However, New Zealand's declaration of war against Germany on 3 September 1939 resulted in these plans being postponed and latter scrapped.

The Tui Sports crashed on Ōhope beach in 1941.
