= NZR Y class =

Steam locomotive

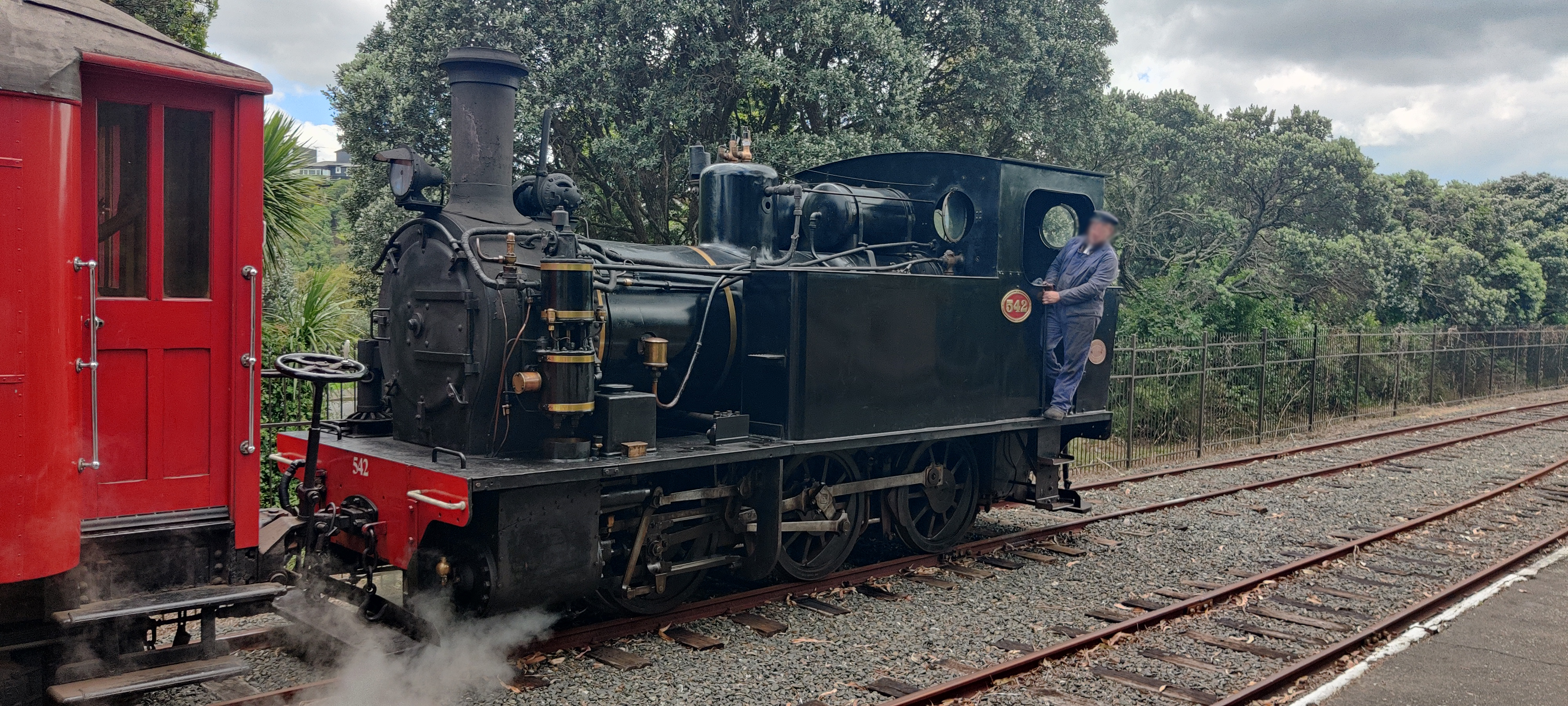
- Y 542 at MOTAT in November 2020
Type and origin
- Power type: Steam
- Builder: Hunslet Engine Company
- Serial number: 1443-1445
- Build date: 1923
- Total produced: 3
Specifications
- Configuration
  - Whyte: 0-6-0T
- Gauge: 3 ft 6 in (1,067 mm)
- Driver dia.: 40 in (1.016 m)
- Wheelbase: 9 ft 6 in (2.90 m)
- Length: 22 ft 10.5 in (6.97 m)
- Loco weight: 23 long tons (23.4 tonnes; 25.8 short tons)
- Fuel type: Coal
- Fuel capacity: 0.85 sq ft (0.079 m^{2})
- Water cap.: 500 imp gal (2,300 L)
- Firebox
  - Grate area: 9 sq ft (0.84 m^{2})
- Boiler pressure: 160 lbf/in^{2} (1,103 kPa)
- Heating surface: 522 sq ft (48.5 m^{2})
- Cylinders: Two, outside
- Cylinder size: 13 in × 20 in (330 mm × 508 mm)
- Valve gear: Walschaerts
- Train brakes: Westinghouse compressed air
Performance figures
- Tractive effort: 10,140 lbf (45.10 kN)
Career
- Operators: NZR
- Numbers: 542-544
- Locale: Auckland area
- First run: October 1923 (PWD), 1938 (NZR)
- Last run: August 1945 (PWD), February 1958 (NZR)
- Withdrawn: 1957–1958
- Preserved: 1
- Disposition: Two scrapped, one preserved

The NZR Y class was a class of three 0-6-0T tank steam locomotives. Built by the Hunslet Engine Company for the Public Works Department in 1923, all three were sold to NZR between 1938 and 1945.

== In service ==
The three Y class locomotives were sold by the PWD to NZR in two batches, N^{O} 543 being purchased in October 1938 and N^{O}s 542 and 544 in August 1945. Originally, they were allocated to the Way and Works Branch for construction work but later saw some use by the Mechanical Branch as shunting engines for hire to private industries whose own engines were under repair. The three engines were transferred to the Mechanical Branch in 1951 and received the class letter 'Y' in 1952. During their service life with the NZR, the locomotives retained their original PWD numbers.

In 1949, N^{O} 544 was loaned to the Whakatane Board Mills for use on their Matahina Tramway while their two ex-NZR F^{A} class locomotives were overhauled. This was the most notable use of one of these engines while on loan from NZR to private industry. While in NZR service, the Y class locomotives tended to be based out of the Auckland locomotive depot and were used for shunting purposes there.

== Withdrawal ==
As a splinter class with very little useful capabilities on a modern railway, the Y class were relatively quickly withdrawn. Y 544 was noted at Wanganui in 1956 behind the locomotive depot with a worn-out boiler, before being finally written off on 17 August 1957. Y 543 remained in service as a working locomotive until withdrawn on 1 February 1958, but remained in semi-storage until sold to Pacific Steel at Otahuhu in early 1964 for scrap.

Y 542 was withdrawn in good working order on 17 August 1957, but it was then sold to Wilsons (NZ) Portland Cement Works for use on their private railway at Portland, south of Whangarei.

== Industrial service ==
Aside from the locomotives' service to the Public Works Department, Y 542 was sold in 1957 to Wilsons (NZ) Portland Cement for use on their private railway between the cement factory near Portland station on the North Auckland Line and the company's quarries. Painted in the standard Wilsons livery of blue with red trim, 542 became the second Wilsons N^{O} 3 in place of an earlier ex-NZR locomotive, D 171, which was scrapped in 1957. 542 continued in industrial service until 1985, by which time it was held in store as a reserve for the company's fleet of Bagnall and Drewry diesel shunting locomotives.

== Preservation ==
Y 542 (Hunslet 1444 of 1923) was sold to Wilsons Portland Cement in 1957 and was used on their internal railway network until 1985, by which time it was kept in reserve. The locomotive was purchased by MOTAT in 1985 and was restored to working order as Y 542. It is currently based on the museum's Western Springs Railway in occasional service.
