= Fred North =

Franco-American helicopter pilot (born 1961)

Frédéric North (born May 10, 1961) a Franco-American motion picture stunt helicopter pilot and aerial coordinator. He is a World Record holder for piloting an AS350B2 helicopter to a height of 42,500 ft in South Africa since 2002. He has worked in Fast and Furious and Transformers franchises, San Andreas, Spectre, and Mission Impossible-Rogue Nation.

== Personal life ==
North was born to French parents Ernest and Monique North Africa and moved to Europe at 19. He obtained his commercial pilot certificate in France at the age of 24.

== Career ==
In 1989, North became a camera helicopter pilot flying for desert rally car races. During 1990-1994, he served as chief helicopter pilot for the Paris-Dakar Rally and Paris-Moscow-Beijing rallies.

In 1996, he was recruited for his first motion picture shoot in Venezuela. His film credits include Armageddon, Gladiator, The Bourne Identity, The Da Vinci Code, The Incredible Hulk, Tropic Thunder, Inception, the Fast and Furious series (including Hobbs and Shaw), Total Recall, Mission: Impossible, Point Break, Captain America: The Winter Soldier, the Transformers series, Pacific Rim, The Wolverine, Bad Boys for Life, and Guardians of the Galaxy.

North performed stunts for Extraction 2, Fall Guy, Beverly Hills Cop: Axel F, and Beverly Hills City Hall. He worked with Roland Emmerich and Michael Bay (Pearl Harbor and Armageddon).
