= Hawke Coachwork =

New Zealand bus and coach body manufacturer

- Founded: 1952
- Founder: Haddon Hawke; Leslie Hawke
- Defunct: 1983
- Successor: Coachwork International
- Headquarters: Takanini, New Zealand
- Area served: New Zealand
- Products: Bus & coach bodies

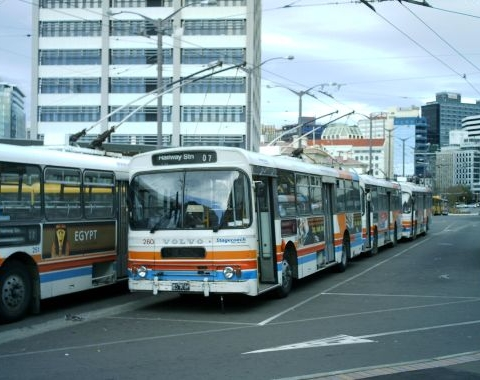
Stagecoach New Zealand Hawke bodied Volvo B58 trolleybus in Wellington

Hawke Coachwork Limited was a New Zealand bus and coach body manufacturer.

Established in 1952 by brothers Haddon and Leslie Hawke, it was based on Great South Road, Takanini. It became a subsidiary of New Zealand Motor Corporation. In the late-1970s Australian bus manufacturer Pressed Metal Corporation acquired a minority stake in Hawke.

In 1983 Hawke merged with New Zealand Motor Bodies to form Coachwork International. The Takanini plant was retained, specialising in building and repairing buses for city authorities. As well as building bodies for New Zealand operators, Hawke completed buses for Singapore Bus Service.
