= Coachwork International =

- Formerly: New Zealand Motor Bodies
- Founded: 26 May 1926
- Defunct: 5 July 1995
- Headquarters: Palmerston North, New Zealand
- Number of locations: 2
- Area served: Asia Pacific
- Products: Bus & coach bodies
- Parent: Jaguar Rover Australia

Coachwork International was a bus manufacturer in Palmerston North, New Zealand. Founded in 1926 as New Zealand Motor Bodies, in 1983 it merged with Hawke Coachwork to form Coachwork International. It ceased trading in 1993.

== History ==
=== New Zealand Motor Bodies ===
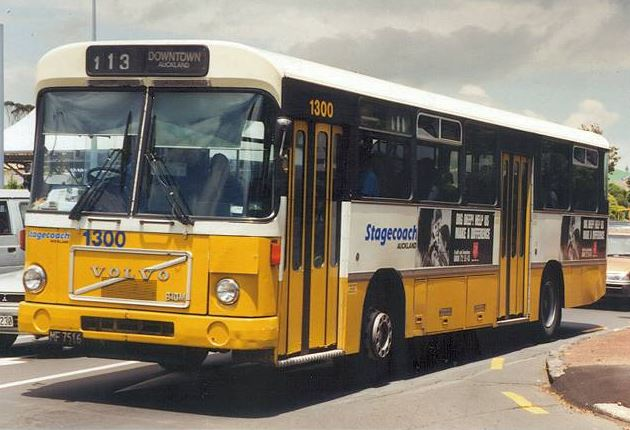
Stagecoach NZMB bodied Volvo B10M

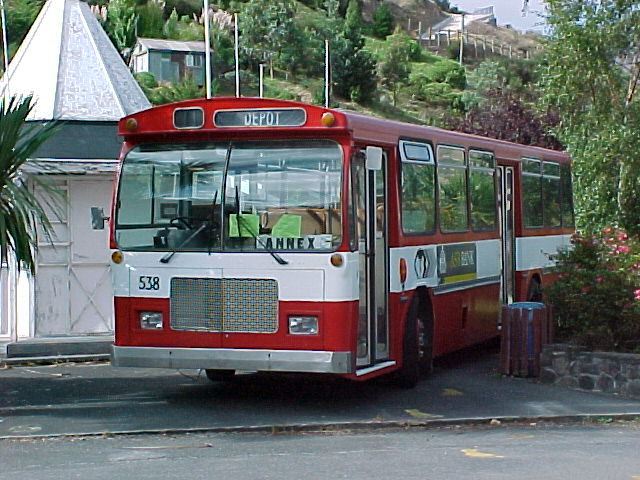
1977 Bristol REL with Carrosserie Hess bodywork built under licence by NZMB

New Zealand Motor Bodies (NZMB) was established in 1926 as Munt, Cottrell, Nielsen and Company Limited when Munt, Cottrell & Co of Wellington and Neilsen's Body Works of Dannevirke merged.

NZMB operated from the corner of Hutt Road and Jackson Street in Petone building metal frame bus and coach bodies and other commercial bodies, hoists and other truck equipment. It bodied over 1,000 Bedford SBs for the New Zealand Railways Department.

A new factory building in Keith Street Palmerston North was opened on 3 July 1977. The new plant covered 18,000 square metres.

=== Coachwork International ===
In 1983 NZMB merged with competitor Hawke Coachwork to form Coachwork International. Owned by Moller Corporation and Newmans, in 1987 it held an 80% share of the New Zealand bus bodying market. Production continued at the Palmerston North plant, while Hawke's plant in Takanini was retained, specialising in building and repairing buses for city authorities. In 1988, Coachwork International was purchased by Jaguar Rover Australia. After Jaguar Rover Australia was placed in administration, and with the impending end of tariff protection. Deloitte & Touche received no offers to purchase the business with operations ceasing in June 1993.

== Products ==
In 1973, it produced the first of 590 VoV bodies for imported Mercedes-Benz, Volvo and MAN bus chassis. In 1977 NZMB obtained manufacturing rights for the Swiss Carrosserie Hess system. In the early-1980s, NZMB bodied 450 Volvo B58 and Mercedes-Benz buses for Singapore Bus Service. In 1981 it began assembling Plaxton Supreme bodies delivered in CKD packs from England.
