= Leyland Landtrain =

British truck

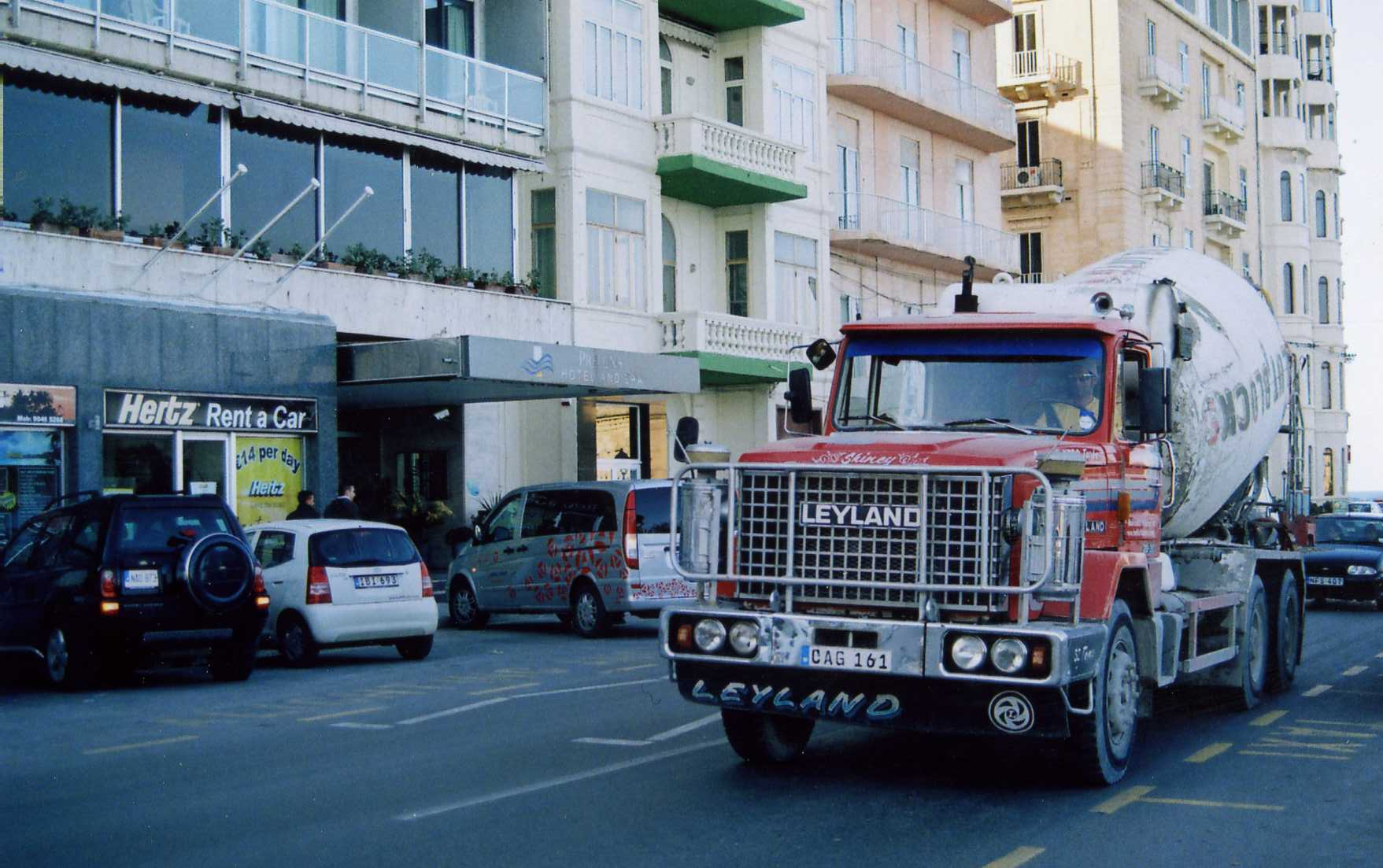
- A Landtrain in Malta 2009

Overview
- Manufacturer: British Leyland
- Production: 1980–1987
- Assembly: UK: Wolverhampton, Bathgate, Watford; Kenya: Thika; Nigeria: Ibadan; Taiwan: Yizhu

Body and chassis
- Class: Heavy truck
- Body style: Rigid; Tipper; Tractor
- Layout: Longitudinal front engine

Powertrain
- Engine: 14 L (850 in^{3}) Cummins or Leyland I6, 240 to 290 bhp (179 to 216 kW)
- Transmission: Manual

Dimensions
- Wheelbase: 6x4 rigid 5,680 mm (223.6 in); 6x4 tractor 4,770 mm (187.8 in)
- Length: 9,337 mm (367.6 in); 7,174 mm (282.4 in)
- Width: 2,478 mm (97.6 in)
- Height: 2,780 mm (109.4 in)
- Curb weight: 19,000 kg (41,888 lb); 30,000 kg (66,139 lb); 36,000 kg (79,366 lb)

The Leyland Landtrain was a heavy truck that was produced in the 1980s by British Leyland. Designed for the export markets in Africa, Asia, Latin America and the Middle East, it was particularly popular in Nigeria, Kenya and Zimbabwe. The Landtrain was designed to be used in areas of limited infrastructure, where roads may be rough and fuel scarce. It was powered by four different engines and produced with three different gross vehicle weights (GVW): 19 tonnes (19 long tons; 21 short tons), 30 t (30 long tons; 33 short tons) and 36 t (35 long tons; 40 short tons)

The Landtrain was produced as both a two-axle 4x2 and a three-axle 6x4 rigid and a 6x4 tractor. The truck was produced in the Leyland plant in Wolverhampton between 1980 and 1982, when production moved to Bathgate, and then finally to Watford in 1984. Kits were exported from these plants to Leyland factories in Yizhu, Taiwan; Ibadan, Nigeria; and Thika, Kenya; where they were assembled. The truck ceased production in 1987 after the merger of Leyland with the Dutch company DAF.

== Design and development ==
Given the project designation of T129, the Landtrain was introduced by British Leyland and marketed as the first truck specifically built for the African, Asian, Latin American and Middle East markets. The design drew upon the expertise of Scammell Lorries, which was also owned by Leyland and had produced a number of successful large military trucks, including the Commander. Similarly, the truck reflected the design of the Thornycroft tractors which were manufactured by the company at the same time. The Landtrain was produced in a range of variants, designated by a two-figure nominal combining the gross vehicle weight (GVW) in tonnes and the designated engine power in brake horsepower (BHP). The truck was launched at the 1980 Geneva Motor Show.

The truck was a bonneted design optimised for operating over poor roads for long distances, where refuelling and servicing facilities were infrequent. To that end, an easy to maintain and robust design was preferred over cutting-edge technology, the chassis was of a straightforward and strong channel section ladder type and fuel tankage could be up to 700 litres (150 imp gal; 180 US gal). Sitting behind rather than above the engine also gave the driver the advantage of not getting warmed by heat rising from the engine, an important consideration in hot climates.

In its three-axle form, the truck was available as a rigid, a tipper and a tractor. As a rigid or tipper, it was 9,337 mm (367.6 in) long, 2,478 mm (97.6 in) wide and 2,780 mm (109.4 in) high, to the top of the cab, with a wheelbase of 5,680 mm (223.6 in). The truck had a GVW that varied between 19 and 36 t (19 and 35 long tons; 21 and 40 short tons). The tractor had a shorter wheelbase of 4,770 mm (187.8 in) and a length of 7,174 mm (282.4 in). Rated gross combined weight (GCW) of the tractor was 65 t (64 long tons; 72 short tons), but an additional trailer could be mounted behind the semi-trailer, where regulations permitted, to create a land train with even more capability.

== Power and transmission ==
The truck was initially powered by a range of four different six cylinder diesel engines, all of 14 litres (854 in^{3}) capacity. Two were produced by Leyland and two by Cummins, with each range including a less powerful naturally aspirated engine and a more powerful equipped with a turbocharger. The least powerful was a Leyland L12 rated at 158 kilowatts (212 bhp) at 2200 rpm. The engine was an adaptation of the larger TL12, which had been previously used in the Marathon 2. The TL12 itself was the second engine available in the Landtrain, but in a lower revving version rated at 210 kW (280 bhp) at 2000 rpm and providing ten per cent more torque. The less powerful of the two Cummins engines was the NHC250 rated at 190 kW (250 hp) and the more powerful the NTE290 rated at 220 kW (290 hp). The Cummins design featured a "big cam" design that provided better fuel economy.

Different gearboxes were used depending on the engine fitted. The L12 was matched to the six-speed Eaton 0403 gearbox with overdrive, while the nine-speed Fuller RT09509A or B range-change was used with the TL12 and NHC250. Both were constant-mesh designs. The NTE290 was initially mated with a six-speed ZFAK6-90 gearbox, but this was replaced by the Fuller unit during production. A Dana Splicer twin plate clutch was fitted.

Power was transmitted to the wheels in the two-axle version through a hub reduction design derived from that used in the Marathon, rated at 13 tonnes (13 long tons; 14 short tons). The three-axle version had double reduction to both rear axles. The axles were each rated at 6.5 t (6.4 long tons; 7.2 short tons). The three-seat cab was simple and was not fitted with air conditioning or other modern conveniences.

== Production ==
Initially, the Landtrain was produced at the Guy Motors factory in Wolverhampton. Production was expected to be 1000 vehicles a year. Production subsequently moved to the plant in Bathgate in August 1982, which led to the closure of the Wolverhampton plant. Subsequently, when the Bathgate plant closed in June 1984, production was moved to the Scammell plant in Watford. In addition to complete trucks, the plants produced Complete Knock-Down (CKD) kits. These were partially completed vehicles which were exported widely to be assembled locally into vehicles. The Leyland plants in Thika, Kenya, and Ibadan, Nigeria were two of the main plants to receive CKDs. Vehicles were produced with combinations of engine power and GVW as 19–24, 19–29, 30–24, 30–29, 36-24 and 36–29. These designations were inscribed on the cab door.

The trucks were popular in Africa, particularly in Nigeria, Kenya and Zimbabwe. They were used for a wide range of tasks, whether general operations or more specialised work like providing emergency relief in Sudan or helping to rebuild the runway in Port Stanley after the Falklands War. A Landtrain came fifth overall, and first in its class, in the gruelling 1,800-kilometre (1,100 mi) three-day Argungu rally. The sponsor, an Alhaji Chanchanji, gave the prize money to an orphanage near the Leyland factory in Nigeria.

In February 1987, Leyland merged with the Dutch firm DAF Trucks to form Leyland DAF. Bonneted trucks were dropped from the range and production of the Landtrain stopped following the merger.
