= Scammell Mechanical Horse =

Type of tractor unit

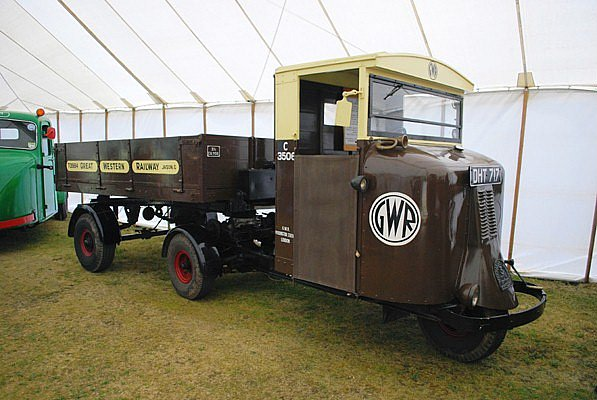
Scammell Mechanical Horse and trailer in Great Western Railway livery

The concept of the Mechanical Horse tractor unit with an easily detached articulated trailer was conceived in the early 1930s by Napier & Son. It has one front wheel in the midline. The London and North Eastern Railway had approached Napier for an answer to the problem of replacing horses for local haulage purposes, while retaining the flexibility of changing the wagons and the maneuverability of the horse and wagon. These vehicles are often known as "Snub-nose Trucks" or "Snub-nose Lorries" because of the round hood in front of the cab.

== Mechanical Horse ==
In 1933 Scammell Lorries Ltd purchased the three wheeled tractor unit design from the Napier Company and promptly turned it into the famous Mechanical Horse.

Production of the 3-wheeled Mechanical Horse commenced in 1934. The design had been refined in 1933 by Oliver Danson North, who modified the original prototype. This featured automatic trailer coupling (Relatives believe the automatic coupling which remains virtually unchanged today was actually designed by Alistair Moncreiff of Scamell but he received no recognition for his work) the single front wheel could be steered through 360 degrees. This was a very simple and sturdy vehicle which was constructed on a steel channel frame and fitted with a wooden cab, the early versions having canvas doors. The Mechanical Horse came in two sizes, capable of pulling loads of three tons and six tons, each of the two sizes had a corresponding coupling size, which became known as the 3-ton and the 6-ton coupling. The tractor units were powered by Scammell's own side valve petrol engine of 1125cc in the 3 ton version and 2043cc in the larger 6 tonner. The engine was offset to the left of the cab, which could cause stability problems in some circumstances. The vehicles had manoeuvrability which was unmatched; it was possible to turn through 360 degrees in under 20 feet with a 16-foot trailer. The road speed of about 20 mph suited the vehicle to local deliveries, and fuel consumption of 10 to 20 mpg was acceptable. Railway companies were the primary customers for the Mechanical Horse, but they were also used by a number of private companies, particularly breweries, who valued the nimble little lorries. The British armed forces used them in stores and on aircraft carriers. The 6-ton coupling equipment was also fitted to popular makes of lorry such as Bedford, Thornycroft and Austin. Bedford tractor units so equipped were sold under the Bedford-Scammell brand. Such was the popularity and success of the Mechanical Horse that there was a separate sales department using dealers for this unique machine. During the difficult trading years of the 1930s the threewheeler was the saviour of Scammell Lorries Ltd.

From 1937, a version of the Mechanical Horse was made under licence in France, by FAR. The power unit from the successful Citroen Traction Avant was used in this version, which was known as the Cheval Mécanique. French production continued until 1970. FAR was a French truck manufacturer, affiliated to Chenard-Walcker. It was founded in 1919 and ceased manufacture in 1970.

The name arose because it was designed to get in and out of narrow twisty passages designed for a horse-and-cart.

== Scammell Scarab ==
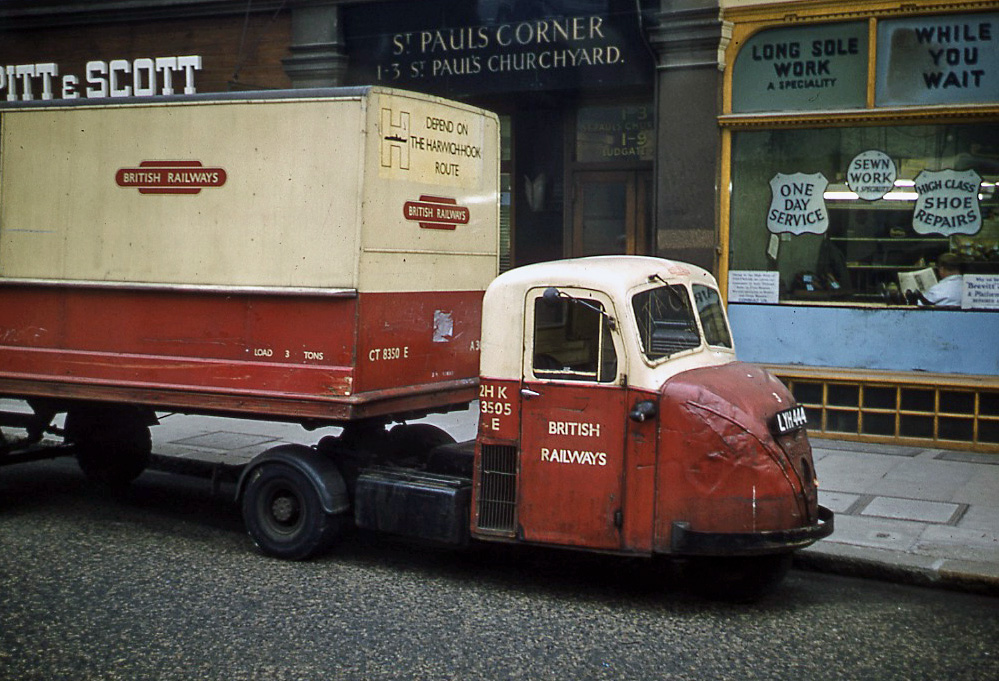
A Scammell Scarab in British Railways livery photographed in London in 1962

In the late 1940s, after a production run of 14,000, the Mechanical Horse was superseded by the Scammell Scarab. The Scarab retained all the familiar, useful features of its predecessor, with many innovations. The chassis frame was cranked downwards to give a lower centre of gravity. The engine, gear box and rear axle were built as one unit, which aided major maintenance. The whole power unit was fitted low down in the chassis behind the cab. The engine radiator was fitted in the back wall of the cab, drawing cooling air from a duct behind the right–hand cab door. The larger side-valve petrol engine of 2090cc was used for both the 3 and 6-ton models. Scammell introduced diesel engines to the range, using the Perkins 4.99 for 3-ton and 4.203 for 6-ton models. The rounded all steel cab, fitted with doors as standard, was slightly more comfortable for drivers. The Scarab remained in production until 1967.

== Scammell Townsman ==
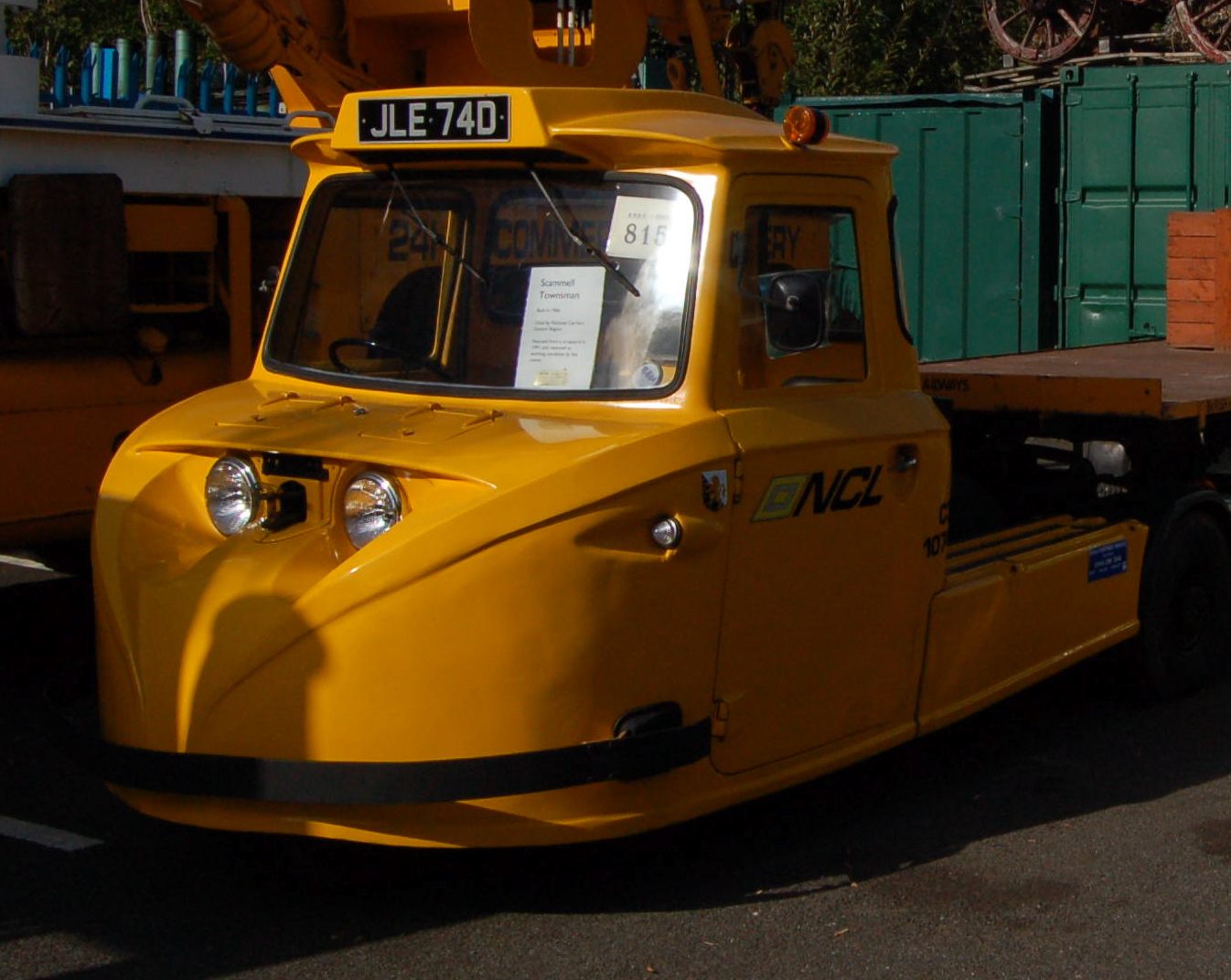
A 1966 Scammell Townsman now preserved at Shildon Lorry Museum

The Scammell Townsman replaced the 3-ton Scarab. There was no provision for a 6-ton model; more conventional vehicles were used to take on the heavier role. The Townsman closely followed the Scarab in its basic design. The frame was of a welded construction and had integral coupling ramps fitted with Scammell Mechanical Horse automatic coupling. The engine, gearbox and driving axle formed a rigid assembly pivoted at the front end in a large rubber bush. A vacuum operated release mechanism replaced the hand lever mechanism used in the Scarab. The futuristic lines of the fibreglass cab were a novelty. Use of GRP (Glass Reinforced Plastic) for the cab had allowed for a more complex shape to be employed. Scammell had experience with GRP cabs in heavy lorries such as the Routeman, Trunker and Handyman which also had cabs designed by Michelotti. The new cab had many new developments, such as vacuum-assisted hydraulic brakes, a heater-demister, two rear view mirrors, interior sun-visors, totally enclosed oil-immersed coil spring front suspension and dual rate mounting of semi-elliptic leaf springs at the rear. Later a larger engine was fitted; the Leyland OE160, being an in-house product due to Standard-Triumph and Scammell then being part of the Leyland Group. The OE160 was used in the Leyland Twenty and Leyland 90 commercials built under Leyland badges by Standard-Triumph. The Townsman had better driver controls and faster road speed (50 mph) but still lacked brakes on all wheels; only the rear axle had brakes. Legislation in the late 1960s regarding braking of goods vehicles meant that the working days of the innovative Scammells were nearing an end.

Production ended in 1968. Around 30,000 Mechanical Horses in total were produced over the 35 years of production, but of those only 30 original Mechanical Horses, 60 Scarabs and 30 Townsman models are known to survive.

== See also ==
- Karrier Cob
