= Oliver Danson North =

British automobile designer

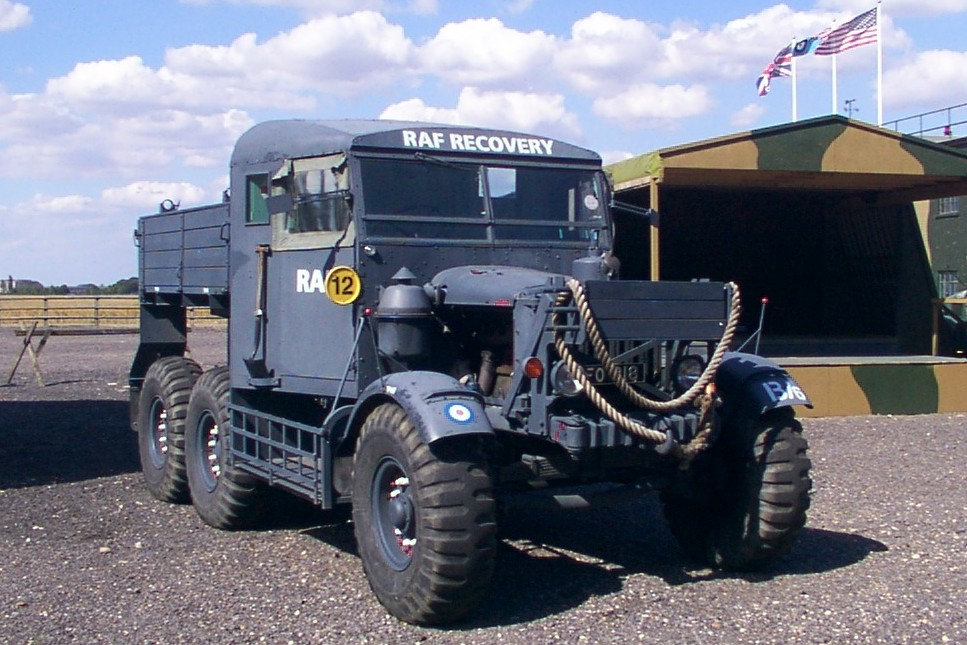
1944 Scammell Pioneer recovery vehicle – in RAF livery. (Preserved, 2002)

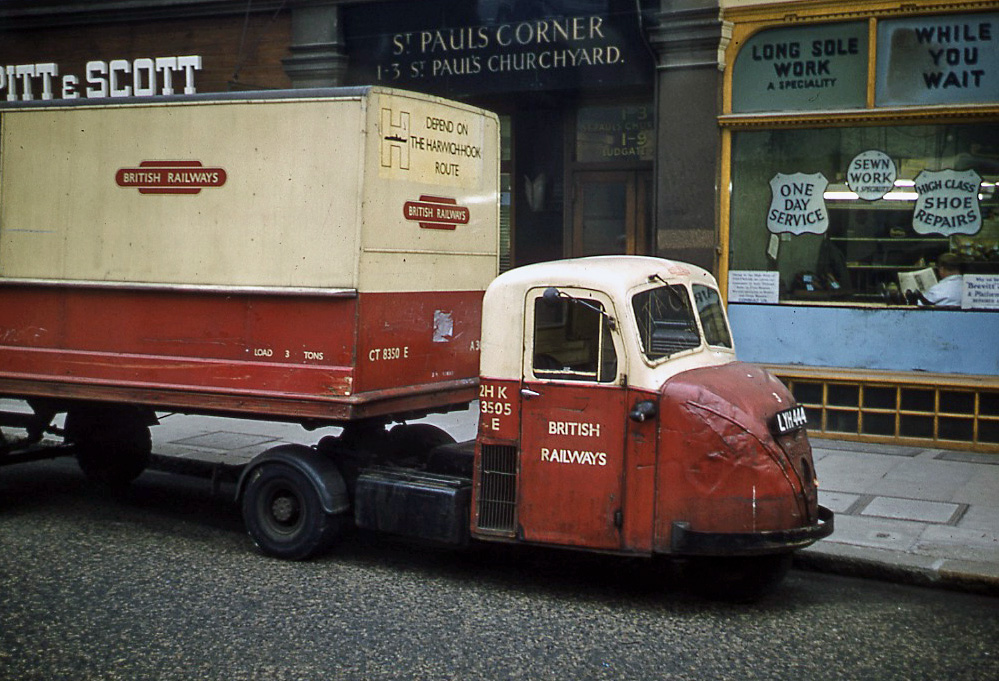
Scammell Scarab in British Railways livery, London, 1962

Oliver Danson North (1887, Willesden Green — 11 November 1968, Haslemere) was a British engineer and automobile designer in the early twentieth century, working for Scammell from 1922.

== Career ==
He was responsible, most notably, for the Scammell Pioneer, a three-axle heavy truck, and the three-wheeled Scammell Mechanical Horse, which subsequently evolved into the Scammell Scarab, a familiar sight in cities and towns often engaged in postal and parcel deliveries. He was also heavily involved in Scammell's design and manufacture of the two Scammell 100 Tonner low-loader vehicles, delivered in early 1930 to Marston Road Services in Liverpool and H.E. Coley in Dartford, Kent. The vehicle delivered to Marston Road Services, known as KD 9168, was used for the delivery of steam locomotives from the manufacturers to Liverpool docks.

== North-Lucas ==
In 1922 Ralph Lucas developed the North-Lucas Radial with Oliver North at the Robin Hood Engineering Works in Putney Vale. This time only one was built, by the Chelsea Motor Building Co. The car had a streamlined aluminium body with a fabric roof and a five cylinder radial engine. It was used by Ralph Lucas himself between 1922 and 1928, covering 65,000 miles in its lifetime.
