= Scammell =

British commercial vehicle manufacturer

Scammell Lorries Limited
- Industry: Automotive
- Founded: 1921
- Founder: George Scammell
- Defunct: 1988
- Fate: Merged with British Leyland
- Successor: Alvis Unipower; DAF Trucks
- Headquarters: Watford, England
- Products: Trucks
- Parent: Leyland Motors

Scammell Lorries Limited was a British manufacturer of lorries, particularly specialist and military off-road vehicles, between 1921 and 1988. From 1955 Scammell was part of Leyland Motors.

== History ==
Scammell started as a late-Victorian period wheelwright and coach-building business, G Scammell & Nephew Ltd in Spitalfields, London. George Scammell, the founder, was joined by his nephew Richard and Richard's sons Alfred and James. By the early 1900s, the firm had become financially stable, providing maintenance to customers of Foden steam wagons. One such customer, Edward Rudd, had imported a Knox Automobile tractor from the United States, and impressed with its low weight/high hauling power had asked Scammell if they could make a similar model of their own.

However, the outbreak of World War I in 1914 stopped the project and presented itself as a turning point in road transport history. Mechanical transport was seen to work, proving its vast potential beyond doubt to forward-thinking companies such as Scammell. George Scammell's great nephew, Lt. Col. Alfred Scammell, was injured and invalided out of the army, and he was able to apply the practical experience he had gained during the war and began developing the articulated six wheeler. Percy G Hugh, chief designer, conceived the idea and at the 1920 Commercial Motor Show, 50 orders were taken for the new design. The vehicle's very low axle weight allowed it to carry 7.5 tonnes (7.4 long tons; 8.3 short tons) payload legally at 12 miles per hour (19 km/h), rather than being limited to 5 mph.

=== Scammell Lorries ===
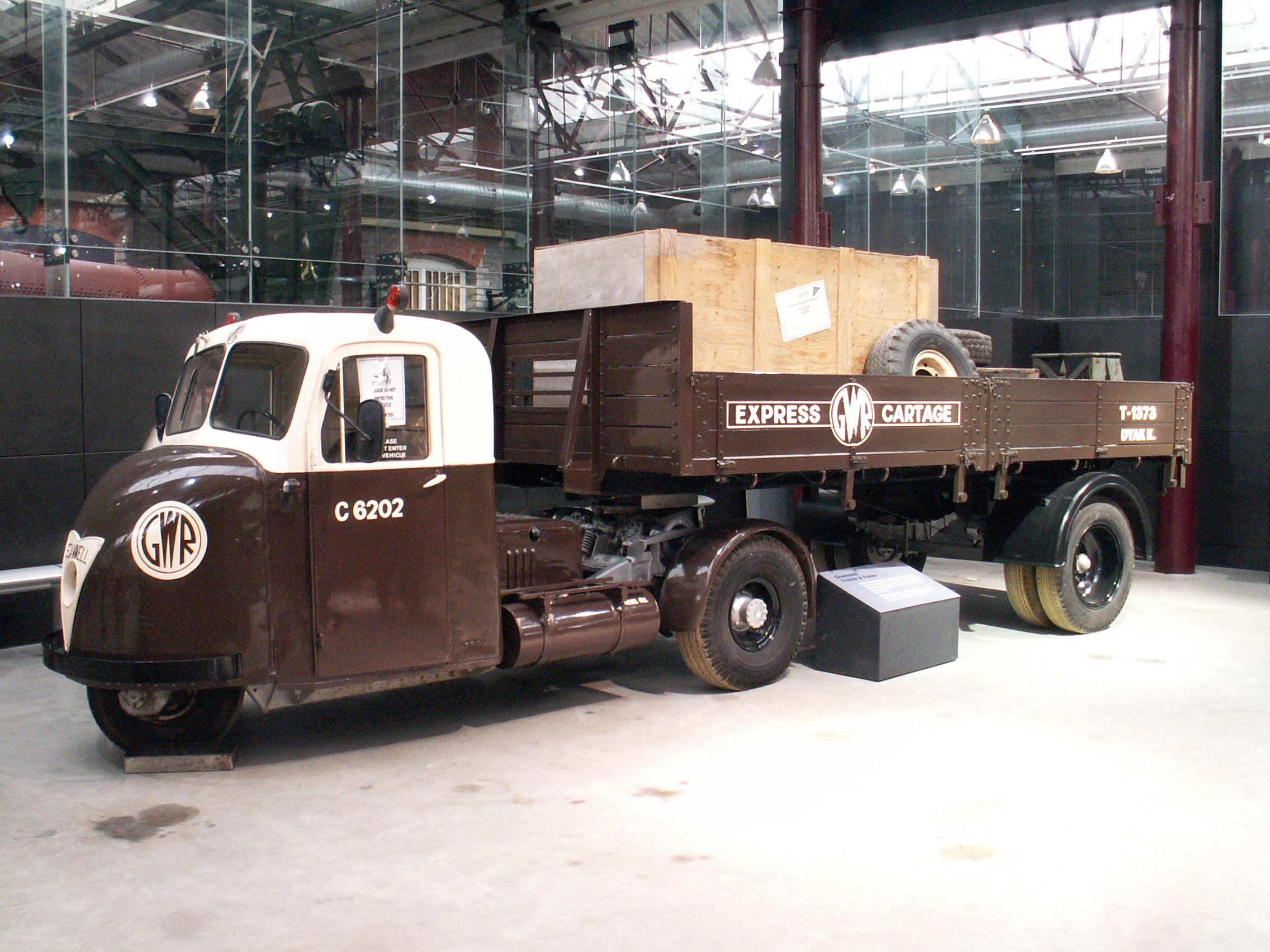
Scammell Scarab and trailer at Museum of the Great Western Railway, Swindon

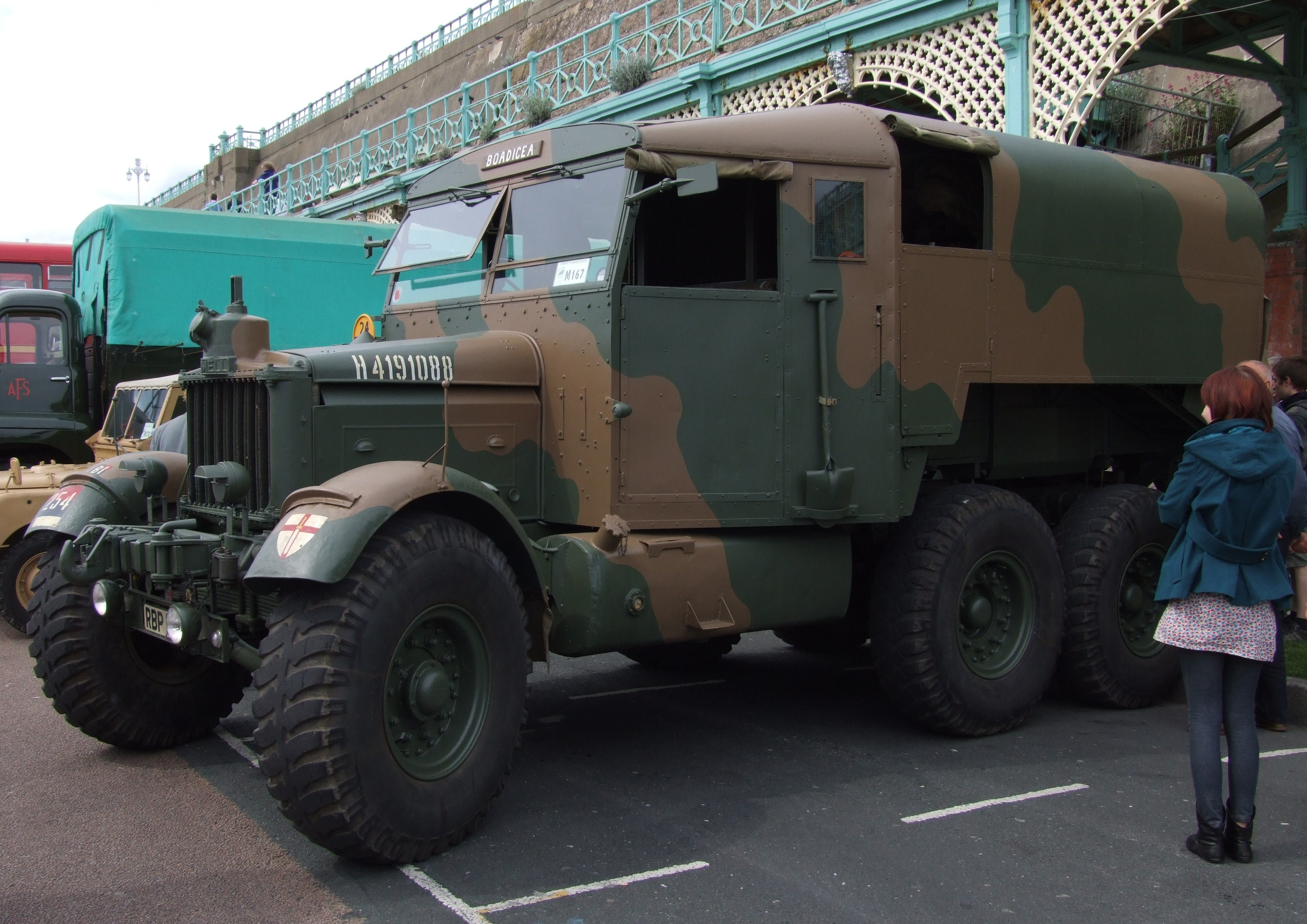
1939 Scammell R100 artillery tractor

Scammell started production of the 7.5-ton articulated vehicle in 1920. Needing to move to new premises, Scammell & Nephew floated a new company, Scammell Lorries Ltd in July 1922, with Lt. Col. Scammell as managing director. The new firm built a new factory at Tolpits Lane, Watford, next to Watford West railway station on the branch line from Watford Junction to Croxley Green. The original company remained in business in Fashion Street, Spitalfields refurbishing and bodybuilding until taken over in 1965 by York Trailer Co.

In 1929, Scammell designed and manufactured the "100 Tonner" low loader. Only two were produced; the first was delivered to Marston Road Services, Liverpool, for the transportation of steam engines to Liverpool docks. Scammell were also looking for new markets, and diversified into four- and six-wheel rigid (nonarticulated) designs. The 'Rigid Six-wheeler' found some success and, with its balloon tyres, at last permitted sustained high-speed, long-distance road operation.

In 1934, Scammell produced the three-wheeled Mechanical Horse, designed by Oliver North to replace horses in rail, postal and other delivery applications. This featured automatic carriage coupling and the single front wheel could be steered through 360 degrees. It was sold in three- and six-ton versions. The three-tonner was powered by a 1,125-cc side-valve petrol engine and the six-tonner by a 2,043-cc engine. Karrier had introduced a similar vehicle, the Cob, four years earlier.

From 1937, a Citroën Traction Avant powered version was made under licence in France, by Chenard-Walcker-FAR, known as the Pony Mécanique. This continued in production, in various versions, until 1970.

In the late 1940s, the Mechanical Horse was superseded by the Scammell Scarab, with similar features, but a much less angular cab and now with a 2,090-cc, side-valve petrol engine in both models and a diesel version with a Perkins engine.

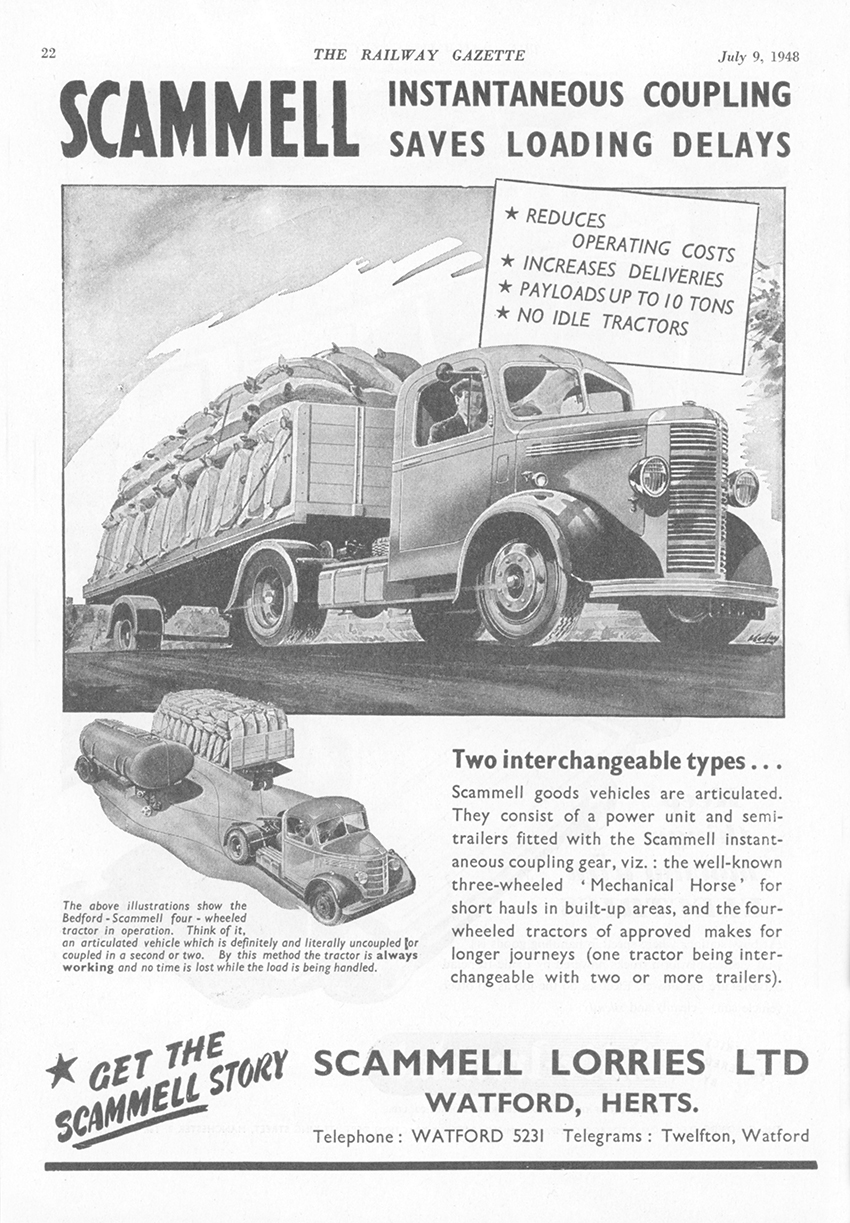
Scammell Advertisement in The Railway Gazette 9 July 1948

The company mainly concentrated on articulated and rigid eight-wheeler lorries, from the 1920s. One vehicle not in those lines that became well-known was the 6×4 Pioneer. This was an off-highway, heavy haulage tractor, first produced in 1927. It showed outstanding cross-country performance due to the design that included the patent beam bogie rear axle, with 2 feet (1 m) of vertical movement for each of the rear wheels. This design was the work of Oliver Danson North. The Pioneer proved popular in the oil field and forestry (logging) markets, and formed the basis of the British Army's World War II R100 30-ton tank transporter. With the outbreak of war, development of new vehicles stopped and production concentrated on military Pioneers for use as artillery tractors, recovery and transporter vehicles.

In 2024, British-based On Scene magazine featured an interview with Dave Crouch of UK firm Crouch Recovery, who, despite the advances elsewhere, still highly praises anything which carries a Scammell badge. So much so that they have amassed a large collection of older recovery vehicles and later model classics that are restored for posterity, and in many cases could still go to work if required.

=== Leyland Group subsidiary ===
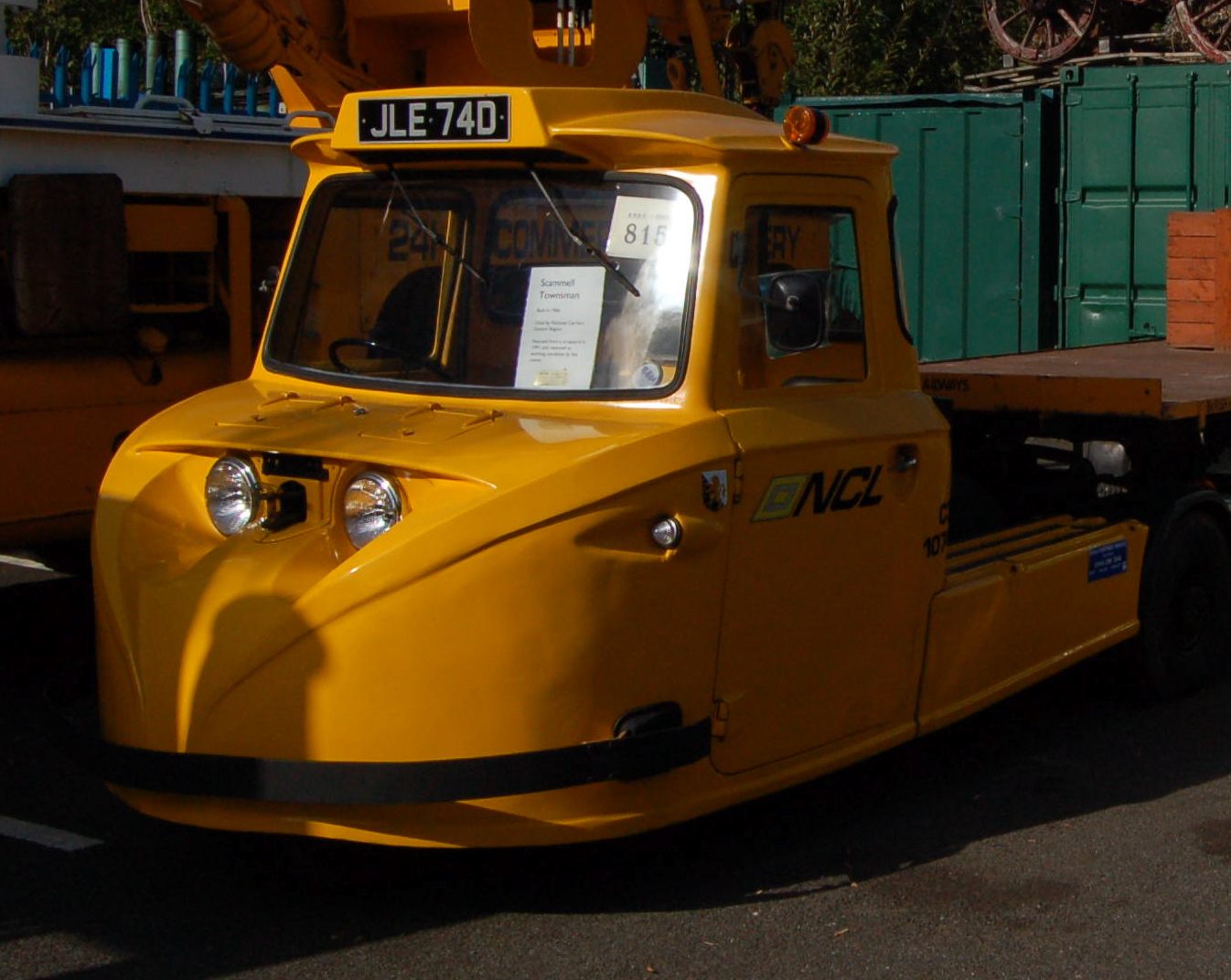
Scammell Townsman at the Shildon Lorry Museum

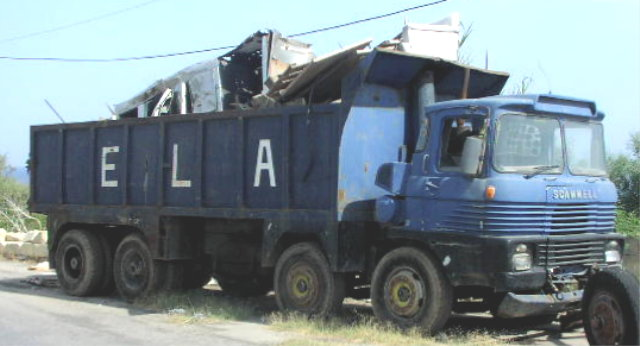
Scammell Routeman 8x4 tipper with Michelotti-designed GRP cab

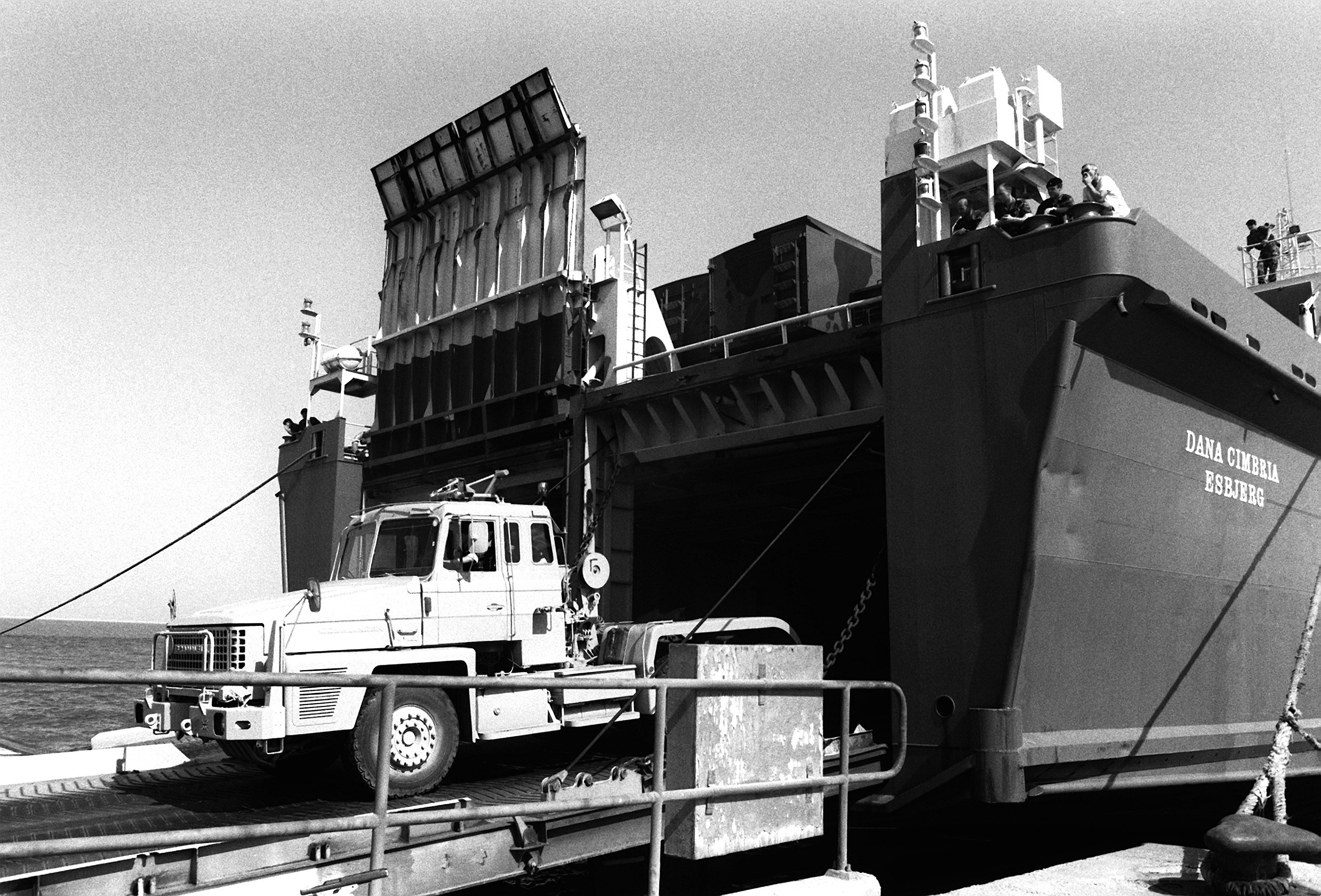
Scammell Commander 6×4 tractor unloads in the Persian Gulf during Operation Desert Shield

Post war, foreign competition and rationalisation of the UK manufacturers led to Scammell coming under Leyland Motors in 1955. This provided access to ready-made components within the Leyland group, allowing the replacement of the "lightweight" range with the:

- Highwayman: bonneted 4x2
- Routeman: forward control 8-wheeler
- Handyman: forward control 4x2

Both the tractor units could be configured up to 50 tons (50.8 Tonnes or 55 short tons), and complemented by the full range of Scammell trailers made at the Moor Park works, allowed the company to continue production in specialist and military markets.

In the 1960s, Scammell contracted Giovanni Michelotti to design its cabs, resulting in a series of glass-reinforced plastic "spring"-like designs. The first to be redesigned was the Routeman, followed by the Handyman. In 1967, the 'Scarab' was replaced by the 'Townsman', which also had a GRP body. The factory also designed the 6x4 Contractor equipped with a Cummins 335 engine, Lipe clutch and Fuller semi-automatic gearbox, that went into production in 1964. Offered with a choice of Leyland 24 tonne or Scammell 30 and 40 tonne bogies, the Contractor was popular in the UK for 240+ ton GTW operation, overseas heavy haul, and with the military for tank transport.

In 1964, Scammell assembled 38 BUT RETB/1 trolleybuses for use in Wellington, New Zealand.

Scammell launched the three-axle 6x4 Crusader at London's 1968 Earl's Court Commercial Vehicle Show. The lorry was designed for high-speed long-distance transport, typically to cover 250,000 miles a year. The lorry included a 'repair by replacement' philosophy to cut downtime and the consequences of unscheduled maintenance. The drive line included a 9.3-litre GM Detroit Diesel 8V71N two-stroke diesel engine, rated at 273 bhp. This drove through a Fuller RoadRanger 16-speed constant-mesh gear box, to an Albion double-drive and two-spring bogie, using double reduction and cross lockable drive axles. The final reduction took place in the hubs to give better ground clearance under the differential housings. Scammell used the same rear bogie on its highly successful 24-ton Double Drive Routeman 8x4 tipper chassis, launched at the same exhibition. As most contemporary 32-ton and maximum capacity lorries in the UK had engine power ratings of between 150 and 220 bhp, the Crusader's 273 bhp attracted immediate attention, much of it unfavourable from deeply conservative operators.

With active encouragement from Walter Batstone, then transport engineering boss at British Road Services, Scammell quickly developed a two-axle model, powered initially by a Rolls-Royce Eagle six-cylinder diesel engine, rated at 220 or 280 bhp, depending on customers' preferences. This new model appeared at the November 1969 Scottish Motor Show at Kelvin Hall.

Scammell went on to develop a heavy haulage model, the Samson, basically a four-axle 8x4 Crusader. It sold in limited numbers in a specialised market sector.

The 1970s started with a reorganisation of the Leyland Group, with heavy haul after the closure of the old Thornycroft works in 1972 concentrated on the newly named Scammell Motors site at Watford. The Thornycroft 6x4 Nubian heavy dumptruck was the first transfer inwards, regularly adapted for the military, followed by the lighter LD55 6x4 dumptruck.

In the late 1970s, the Contractor Mk2 was developed, together with the Scammell Commander tank transporter for the British Army. Fitted with the Rolls-Royce CV12TCE 26-litre, 48-valve dual-turbocharged 625 hp intercooled V12 diesel engine, semi-automatic gearbox and Scammell 40-ton bogie, it was plated at 100 ton+ GTW. Because it was intended as part of the strategy to defend West Germany's eastern Iron Curtain border against tank attack, it was designed to achieve the same acceleration and braking performances as a contemporary commercial 32 tractor. Both tractors were brought into production within the newly built "moving line" construction shop, which gave Scammell a modern state-of-the-art factory. The Commander fleet came into operation in 1983.

In the late 1970s, Leyland Group decided to develop two new tractors: the overseas bonneted Landtrain; the UK forward control Roadtrain. Scammell was contracted to develop the Landtrain, which used the same cab and bonnet as the Commander replacement, the S24. Equipped with Cummins NT 350 or 400 engine, the S24 could be specified from 40 tonnes GVW to more than 200 tonnes GTW. Scammell also gained the contract to develop and build the eight-wheeled version of the Roadtrain called the Constructor 8 model. This also allowed Scammell to develop and produce the complementary S26 range of heavy-haul 4x2, 6x2 and 6x4 tractors, which was a parts-bin build from the Roadtrain and 24 components.

=== Closure ===
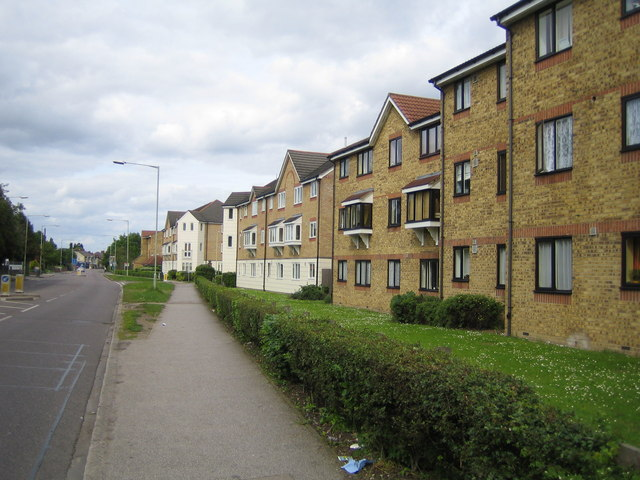
Houses developed on the former Tolpits Lane works

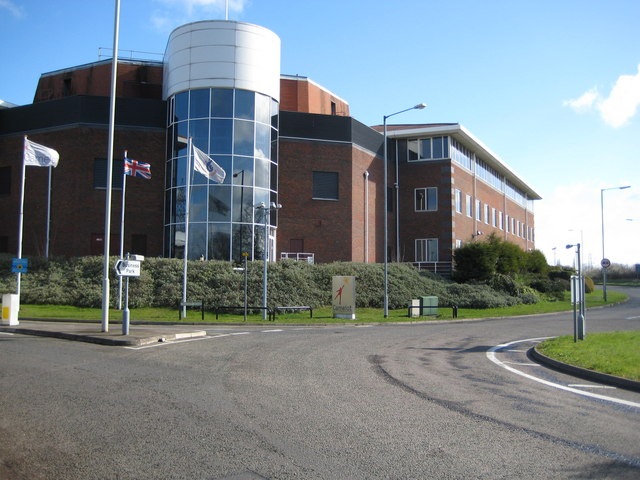
Offices of Camelot Group on the business park which now occupies part of the former Tolpits Lane works

In 1986, Scammell tendered for the British Army hooklift DROPS tender, using the newly developed 8x6 variant of the S24. This was equipped with a Rolls-Royce 350 engine, ZF automatic gearbox and Kirkstall axles. However, shortly after winning the contract to supply 1,522 such vehicles, Leyland group was bought by DAF of the Netherlands. DAF elected to build the S26 DROPS at the Leyland plant in Lancashire, and to close the Watford factory.

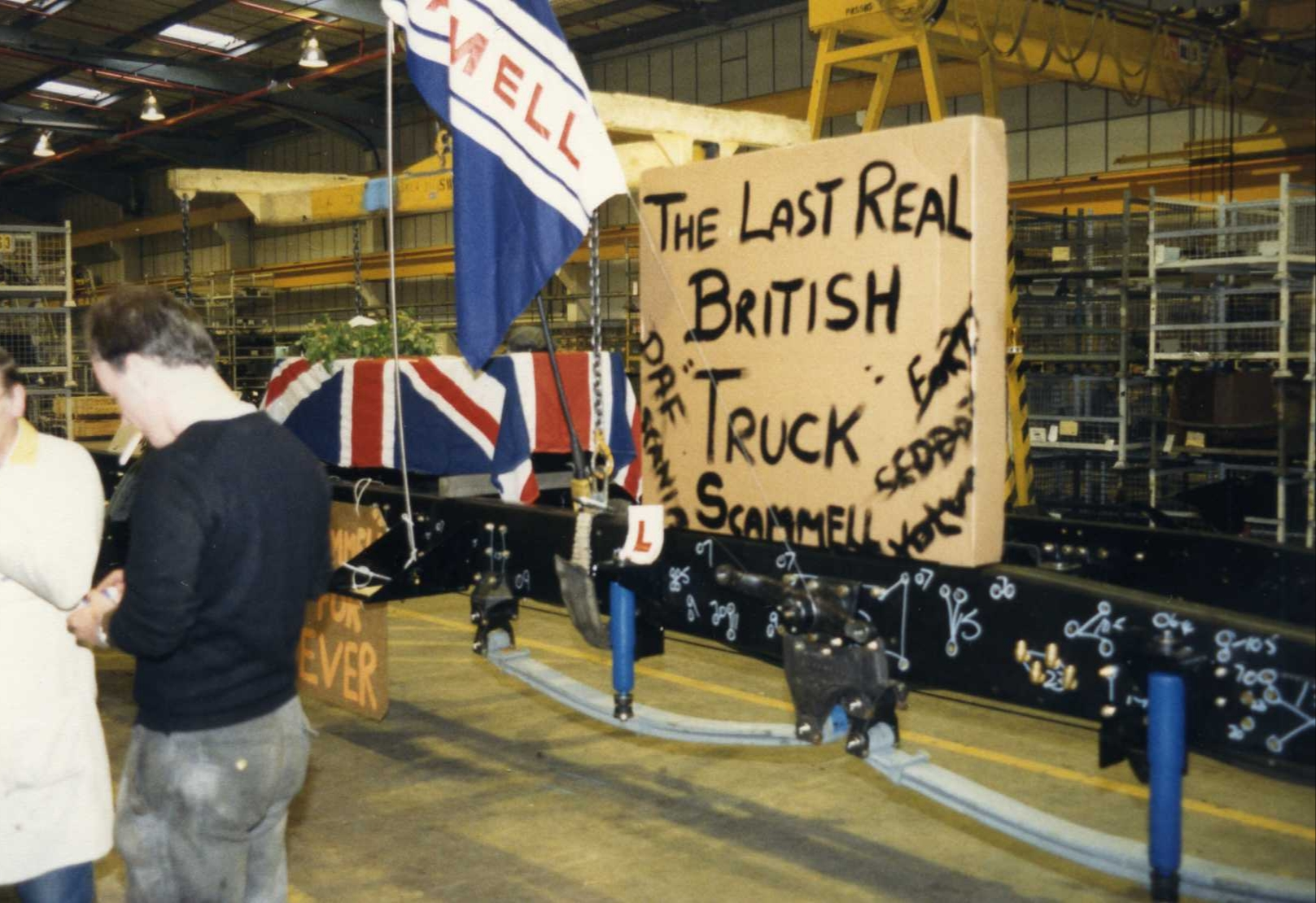
Last lorry on the Assembly line in K block

DAF closed the plant in July 1988. It sold the site for redevelopment, and further sold the rights to manufacture (but not the rights to the name nor the premises) of the S24, Nubian, Crusader, and Commander to Alvis Unipower. They opened a new plant in West Watford, offering ongoing support and spare parts for Scammell vehicles.

The Tolpits Lane site was redeveloped into a housing estate, the Vale Industrial Estate, and a business park. Tenants include the Camelot Group.

== In popular culture ==
- Number Six uses a Scammell Highwayman low loader to escape the Village in Fall Out, the final episode of British science fiction series The Prisoner.
- In the children's TV series Thomas & Friends, the road vehicle characters Butch, Max and Monty, Madge and Nelson are all based on Scammell vehicles.
- An S24 Tank Transporter is Jill's vehicle in the Terry Gilliam film Brazil.
- “Eighteen wheeler Scammells” was among the reason to be cheerful in Ian Dury and the Blockheads 1979 hit single Reasons To Be Cheerful Part 3.
- A unlicensed Scammell S24 is featured in the off-roading video game Snowrunner with some changes. In-game it is called the Royal BM17.

== Vehicle list ==
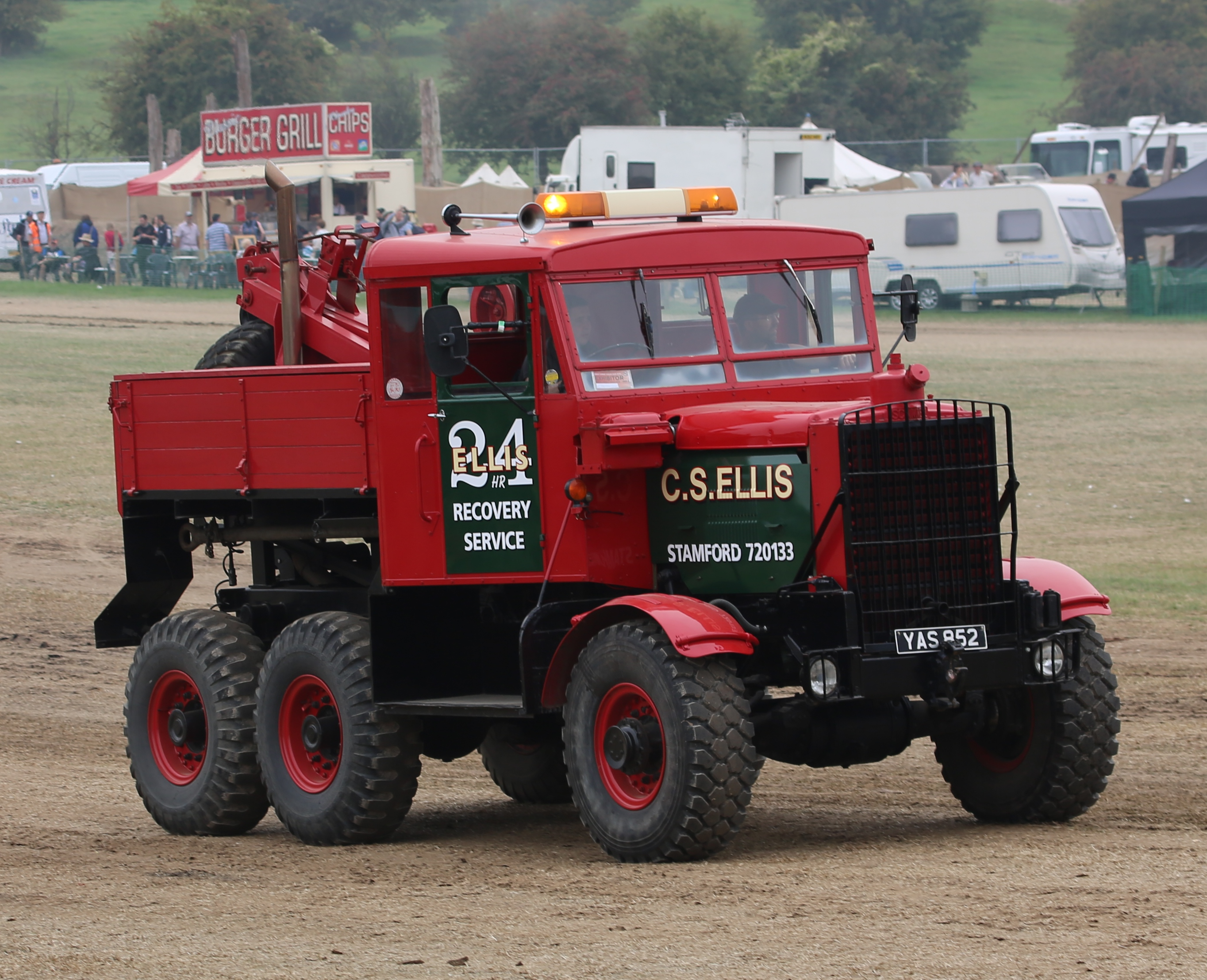
Scammell Explorer fitted as a heavy recovery vehicle

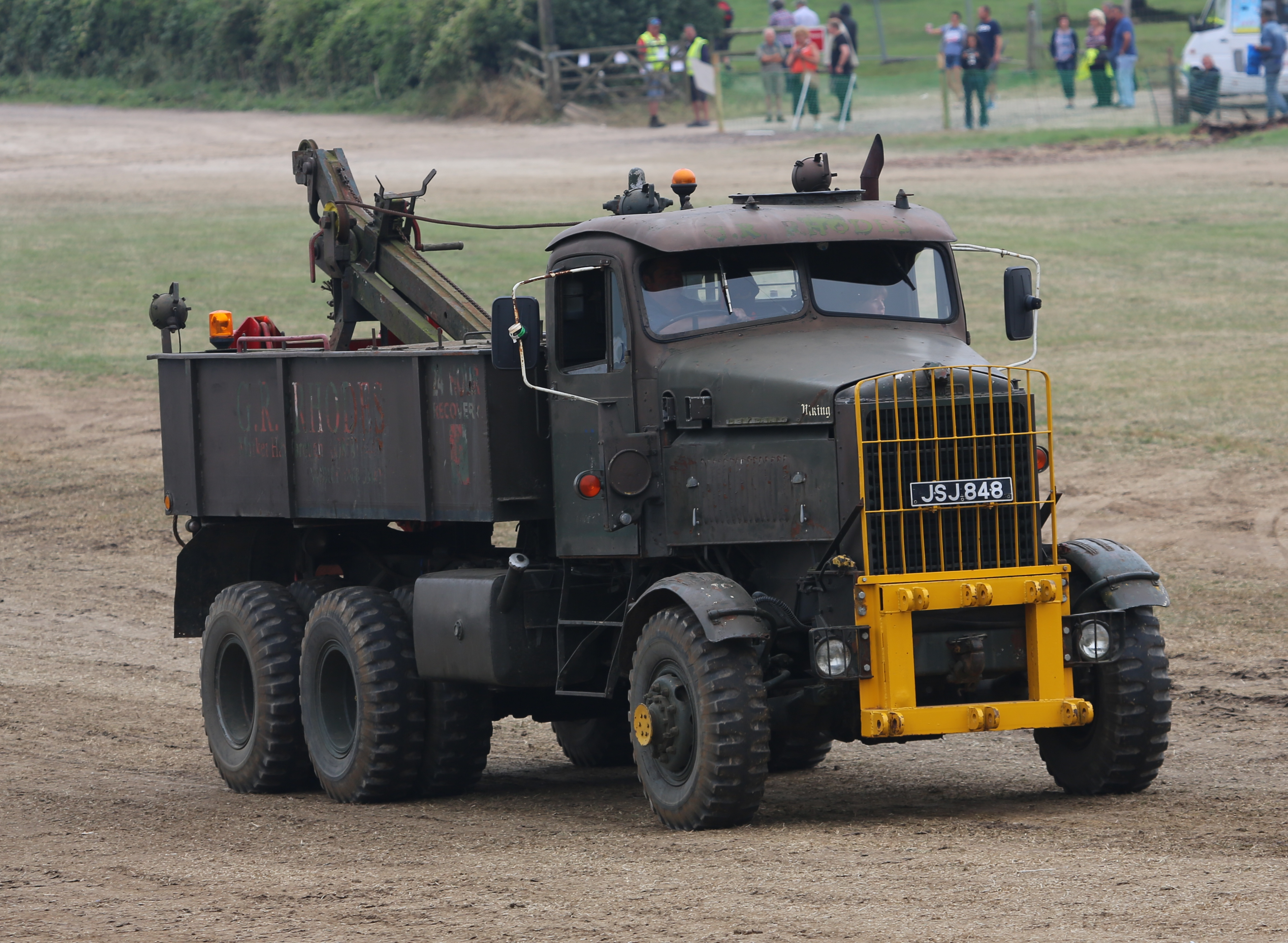
A Scammell Constructor

- 80 Tonner
- 100 Tonner
- Commander
- Constructor

Constructor 6WD

- Contractor

Contractor 8X4

- Crusader – See below
- Explorer 6X6
- Handyman – See below
- Highwayman
- Himalayan
- Mechanical Horse, Scarab and Townsman
- Mountaineer 4WD
- Pioneer, Pioneer Semi-trailer (tank transporter)
- Rigid Eight
- Rigid Six
- Routeman
- S24 6X4

S24 6WD S26 6WD S26 8WD

- S26
- Samson 8X4
- Showtrac – Showman's tractor fitted with generator for fairground ride haulage and power supply
- Trunker – See below

== Products ==
=== Rigid 6/8 ===
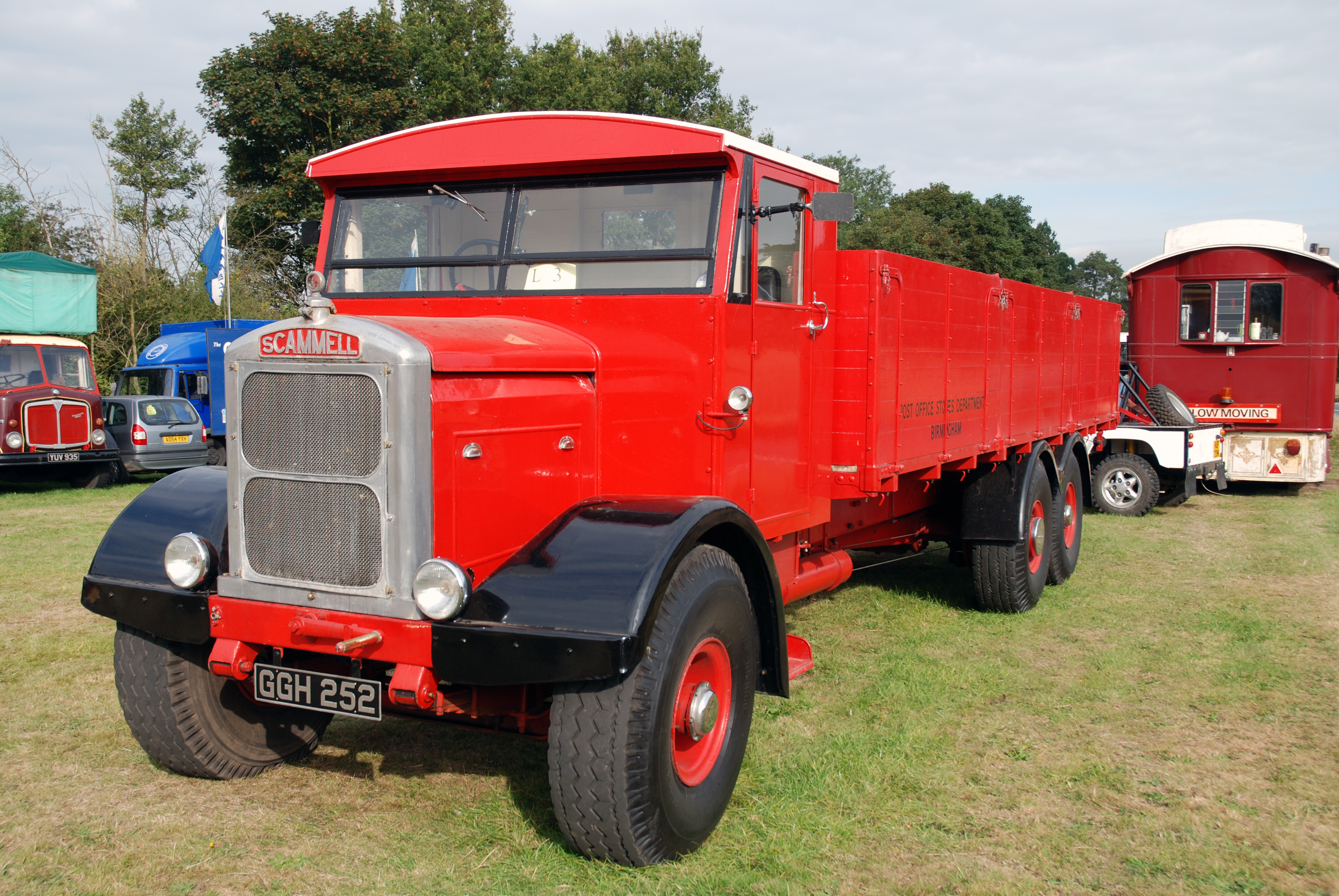
1939 Scammell Rigid 6

The Rigid 6 and Rigid 8, for the number of wheels, were produced from 1937 to 1958.

=== Showtrac ===
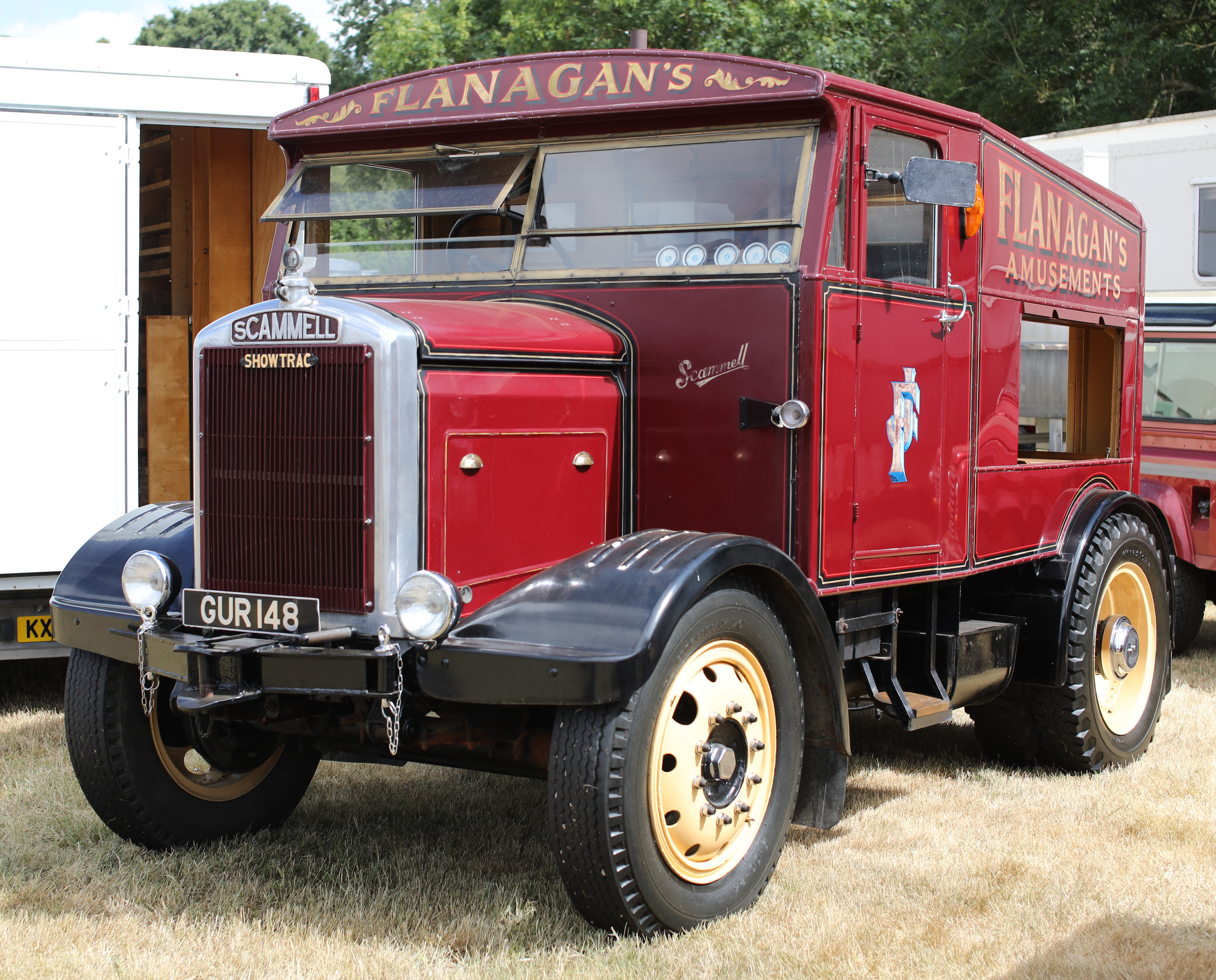
Scammell Showtrac GUR 148

The Showtrac was a short-wheelbase 4x2 ballast tractor, one of the few vehicles ever designed specifically for fairground use. It could be supplied with a rear body (with half-height roller shutter access doors), winch, and dynamo with the ballast block underneath. Eighteen were built, to varying specifications (not all had the body fitted, for example), between December 1945 and September 1948. Seventeen have been preserved. There are many look-alike Scammell tractors, but genuine Showtracs had a special "Showtrac" badge on the radiator, and a full-width cab.

Number	Registration	Name	Chassis No.	Original owner	Built	Notes
1	DWN 766	HIS MAJESTY	6032	Henry Studt & Sons, Swansea	December 1945	Preserved by Roger Austin, Raunds, Northamptonshire, then his family.
2	HAU 964		6109	Henry Armstrong, Nottingham	April 1946	Preserved by Russell Cook.
3	EDL 111	KING	6074	Arnold Brothers, Isle of Wight	May 1946	Sold to the Tommy Benson Fun Fair Outfit in 1953, still owned by the family.
4	ACF 38		6108	Cyril English, West Suffolk	May 1946	Preserved by Joe Corbett.
5	CU 4667	UNIQUE	6111	John Powell, South Shields	May 1946	The Powell family auctioned this Showtrac on Friday, 25 September 2009, for £46,000 to Pete Sanders of Barnstaple, Devon.
6	HTO 221	PROGRESS-LEGEND	6114	Hibble & Mellors, Nottingham	June 1946	Operated by E.L. Morley's Super Plesure Fairs, Salford, from 1964, preserved by Neil B. Padgett from 1973 to 1982, then by Tom Nicholson up to around 1997, then bought by present owners, Neil & Freda Corner, Leyburn, County Durham. Purchased in 2016 by Carters Steam Fair.
7	HRL 121	KING CARNIVAL; CITY OF BRISTOL	6115	J. Rowland & Sons, Cornwall	June 1946	Restored. Still owned by the Rowland family, St. Blazey, Nr. St. Austell. Cornwall.
8	DDT 181	WEST RIDING	6173	Frank Harniess, Doncaster	June 1946	Sold to showman Harry Wigfield in 1969, eventually preserved by Roger Austin. Still owned by his family.
9	DDT 180		6188	Tom Harniess, Doncaster	July 1946	Sold to showman Gordon Eddy in 1967; he named it "Melray" after his two sons, Melvin and Raymond. Scrapped in 1969 at Selby, but was later rebuilt from parts, being unveiled in 2025.
10	GUR 148		6189	John Flanagan, Watford	July 1946	Went to the Alice Webb Fun Fair Outfit, then bought by Roger Austin in 1989 and restored. Still owned by his family.
11	DCO 212	GLADIATOR	6190	Anderton & Rowland, Plymouth	August 1946	Still owned by Anderton & Rowland – George DeVey – can be seen (on loan) at Dingles Fairground Heritage Centre, Lifton Devon.
12	DCO 265	DRAGON	6209	Anderton & Rowland, Plymouth	August 1946	Still owned by Anderton & Rowland Fun Fair – Colin DeVey – can be seen (on loan) at Dingles Fairground Heritage Centre, Lifton Devon.
13	KDH 141	THE LEADER	6210	Demonstrator for Showtrac Dealer, Harrison's, from new	September 1946 to 1949	on Trade Plates, then sold to Pat Collins, Walsall. Went out of service in 1966, bought by showman Pepper Biddall in 1989. It was restored and is now owned by John & Alf Biddall.
14	EWN 437	GEORGE V	6357	John Studt & Sons, Swansea	June 1947	Was bought by showman E.T. Studt later on, preserved by a Doctor Williams from 1974, passed on to Micky Harris, but the current owner is Pete Sanders of Barnstaple, Devon.
15	LDH 253	THE MAJOR	6358	Clara Collins, Walsall	June 1947	Worked until 1976, went to the Barry Island Amusement Park, was restored to some extent and attended the Much Marcle Rally in 1980 and the 1981 Nottingham Goose Fair. Now preserved by Russell Cook.
16	JYA 962	JOHN BULL	6317	Anderton & Rowland, Plymouth	September 1947	Still owned by Anderton & Rowland – Ernie DeVey – can be seen (on loan) at Dingles Fairground Heritage Centre, Lifton Devon.
17	JFJ 367	THE SHOWMAN	6656	Anderton & Rowland, Plymouth	July 1948	Anderton & Rowland only had this fairground lorry for a short while, it went back to Harrison's, the Scammell Showtrac Dealers, who sold it to the travelling fun fair outfit of Mrs. A Deakin. Neil Corner bought it in 1974 for restoration and preservation, then sold it to B. Herbert of North Humberside. Owned by Colin Jones of Lyme Regis who restored much of the coach work and engine, now currently owned by Malcolm Holder.
18	JFJ 457	CITY OF EXETER	6595	T. Whitelegg & Sons, Plymouth	September 1948	Preserved by Peter Startup, but was restored by fairground vehicle enthusiast Robbie Richards of Redruth, Cornwall. He bought this Showtrac in 2005. Now owned by enthusiast Kevin Gamlen of Bristol.

=== Handyman ===
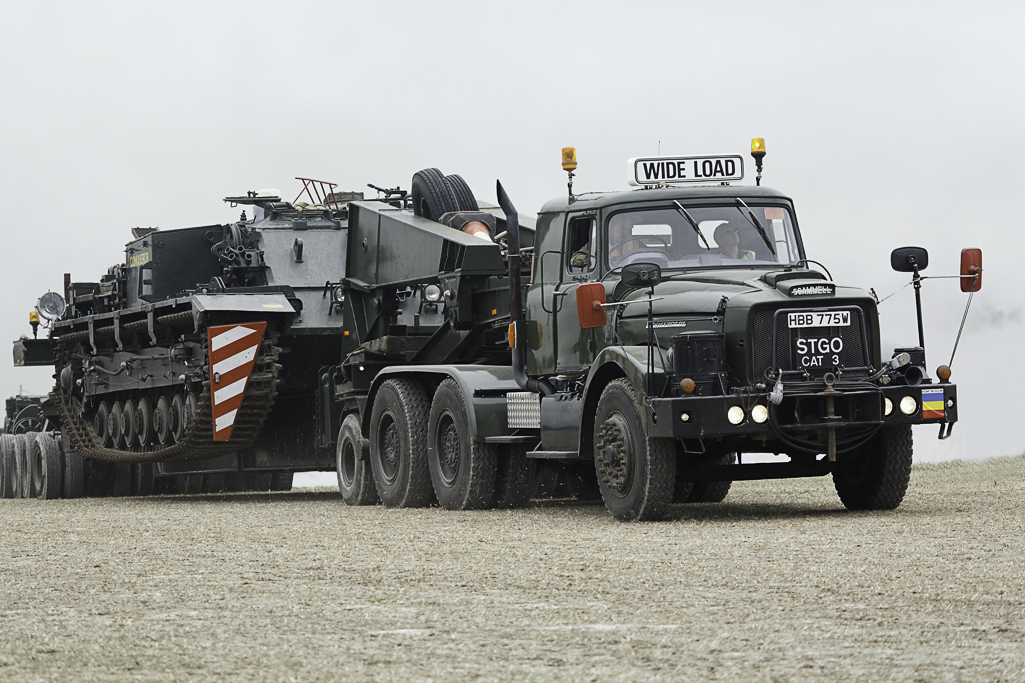
Scammell Contractor hauling a Conqueror ARV2 FV222 Tank Recovery Vehicle (REME owned)

The Handyman initially used a glass-fibre cab designed by Scammell – for the Mark 2 and 3 versions a new Michelotti-designed "cheesegrater" fibreglass cab as used on the 2nd and 3rd versions of the Routeman Rigid was fitted.

Early versions were equipped with Scammell's own "gate-change" gearbox but subsequent versions were fitted with AEC and David Brown gearboxes.

Engines fitted included the Leyland 680, Gardner 150 and Rolls-Royce 220.

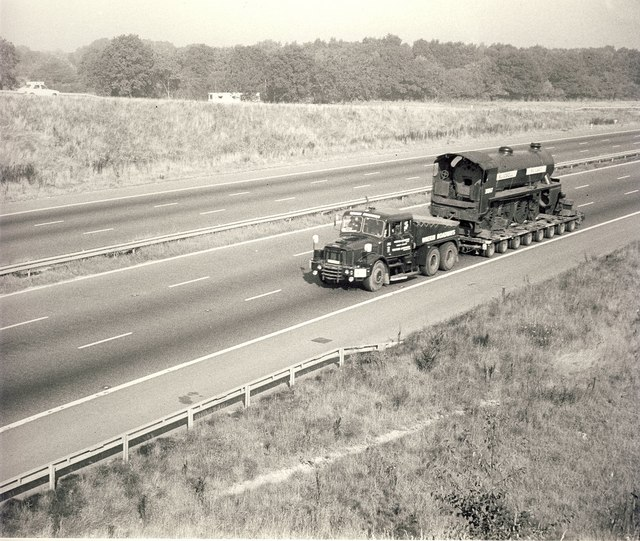
Scammell Contractor hauling an LSWR S15 class steam locomotive from Barry Scrapyard for preservation at the Bluebell Railway in October 1978

=== Trunker ===
The Trunker was a three-axle version of the Handyman.

=== Contractor ===
The Contractor was a 6x4 tractor used by various operators including the Australian Army as a tank transporter or as heavy haulage, usually engineering plant for the Royal Australian Engineers. The Australian military units were configured with 335HP Cummins diesel engines and pneumocyclic gearboxes. While one of the trials vehicles which served in the Vietnam War was branded with the Scammell name, most of the remaining units were branded Leyland. Two trailer specifications were used, a 24-wheel float with 16 wheel dolly trailer for transporting the Australian Centurion tank or US Patton tank in Vietnam. The other trailer was a 40 Ton 12 wheel Steco folding goose neck trailer for the engineering plant.

=== Crusader ===
The Crusader was a 4×2 or 6×4 tractor that used a Motor Panels-supplied steel cab, available in sleeper- or day-cab forms. It had the option of Detroit Diesel, Cummins, Rolls-Royce or Leyland engines.

The Crusader was used by the British Army as a 6×4 tow-truck (with EKA underlift equipment) and as a 6x4 tractor unit normally used for towing 35–tonne plant trailers or 30–tonne tank bridge transport trailers. A recovery variant was also in use. The British Army replaced the Crusader in the late 1990s by a Seddon Atkinson tractor unit with a 40–tonne plant trailer and a specialist tank bridge transporter. Many have seen use in the heavy haulage industry due to their incredibly strong chassis. The special heavy haulage tractor was the Crusader based Samson 8×4 with tridem axles.

The military specification vehicles were usually equipped with 15-speed Fuller gearboxes and an 8–tonne capstan winch.

=== Commander tank transporter ===
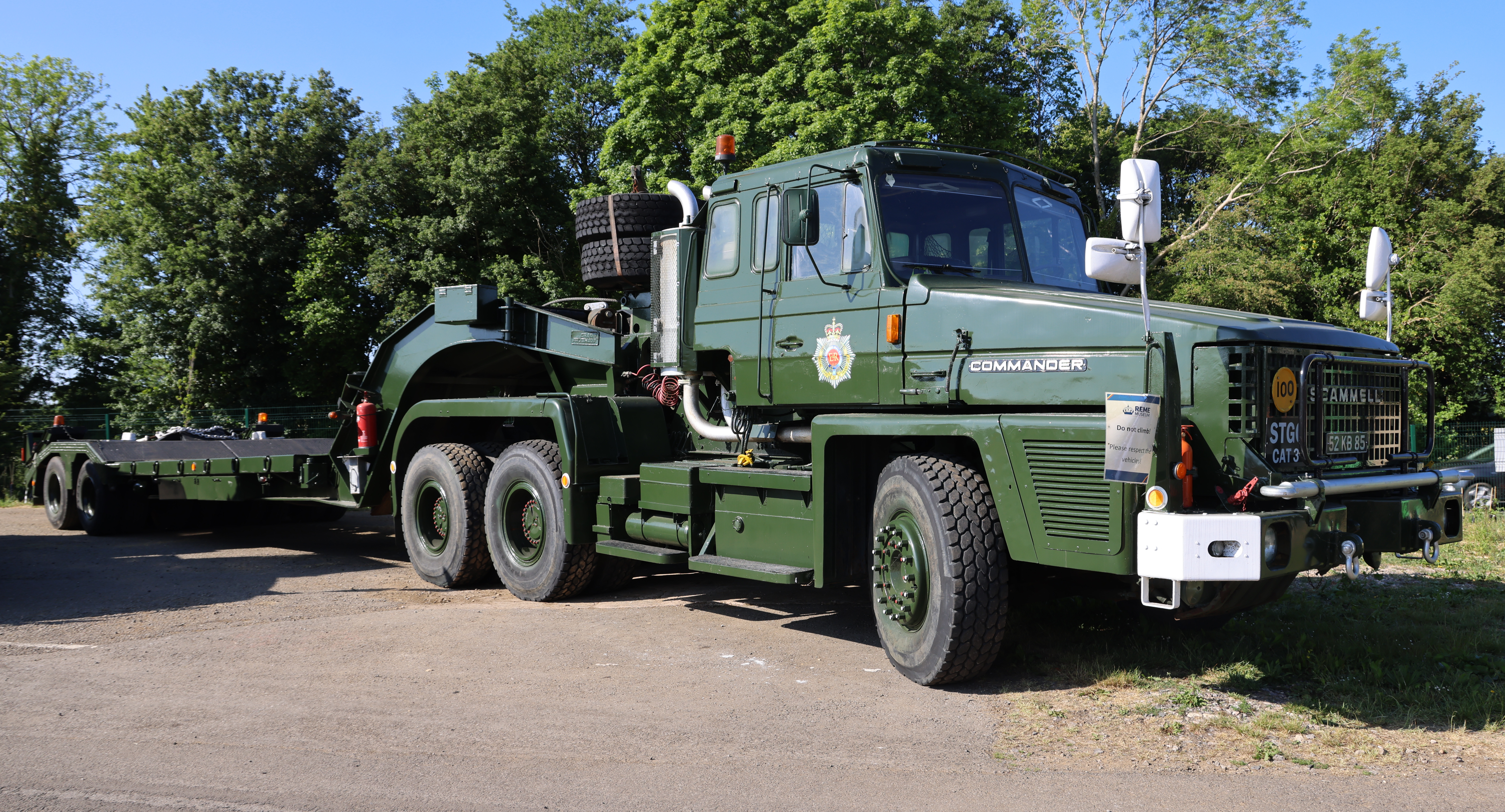
Scammell Commander

The Commander was introduced as a tank transporter in 1978. Designed in the late 1970s, they replaced the Thornycroft Antars in the British Army beginning with the delivery of the first one on 30 March 1984 followed by others totaling 125 units.

The 6×4 units could carry a load of 65 tonnes and were used to transport Challenger I tanks. Used during the Gulf War, they were retired in 2002 and replaced by the Oshkosh M1070F HET.

The Commander is powered by the 26.7L Rolls-Royce/Perkins CV12 TCE twin turbocharged diesel engine that produces approximately 625 hp (466 kW) and is coupled to an Allison automatic transmission. The Scammell Commander CV12 engine is very similar to the ones used in the Challenger 1 and 2 main battle tanks but with an increased power output of around 1,200 bhp (890 kW). Designed to tow loads up to 65 tonnes, the Commander tows a special semi-trailer onto which tanks can be tail-loaded using a hydraulic 20–tonne capacity winch. A prominent bonnet houses the vehicle's Perkins (Rolls-Royce) CV 12 TCE V12 and although the Commander is powered by the Perkins/Rolls-Royce engine, other types were also proposed – one of the prototypes used a Cummins KTA 600 diesel. The cab has provision for up to three or four passengers and there is space for two bunks behind the front seats. Due to the front axle lock angle, the Commander is highly maneuverable and can negotiate a 'T' intersection with only 9.15 meters between the walls.

In 1988 the Leyland group including Scammell company was bought by DAF, the rights to the Commander were sold to Unipower Ltd, who opened a new plant in West Watford.

In 1990 during the operation Desert Storm 70 Scammell Commander heavy tank transporters were used to transport 40 types of various military cargo. Each of the vehicles was on the road 17 hours a day during a 4-month period and on average each vehicle traveled 270 km a day on the desert roads. Most of the 125 British Army Commanders were based in Belgium and Germany, with only a few in the United Kingdom.

== See also ==
- Ballast tractor
- Oliver Danson North

== Gallery ==
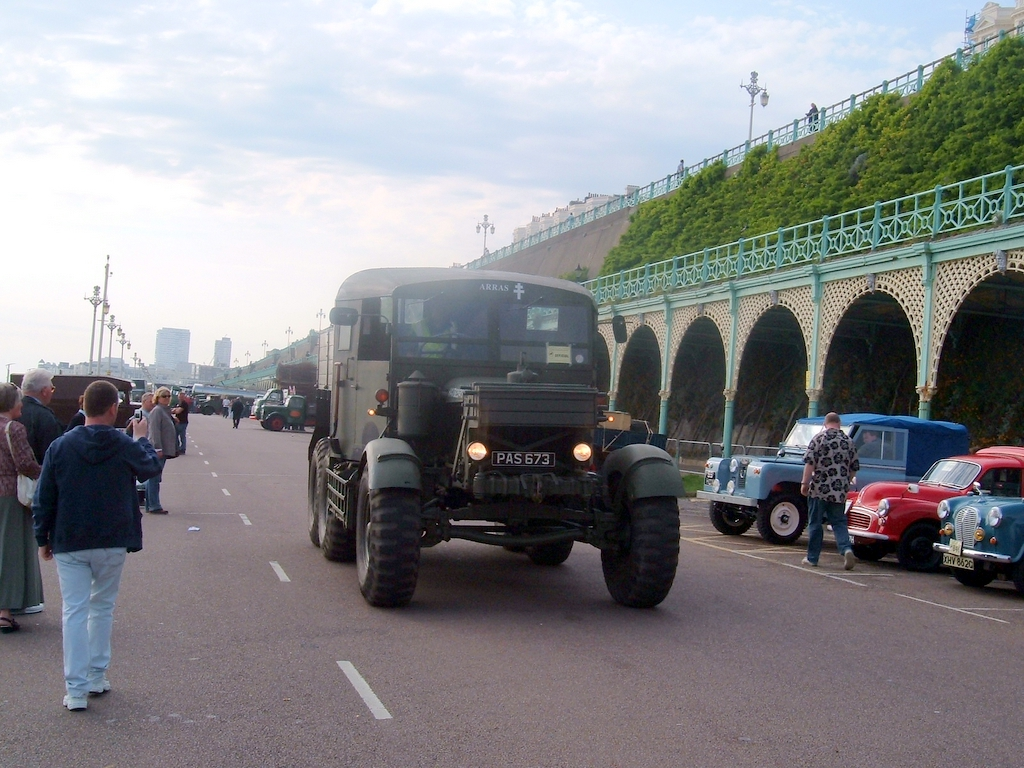
1941 British Army Pioneer

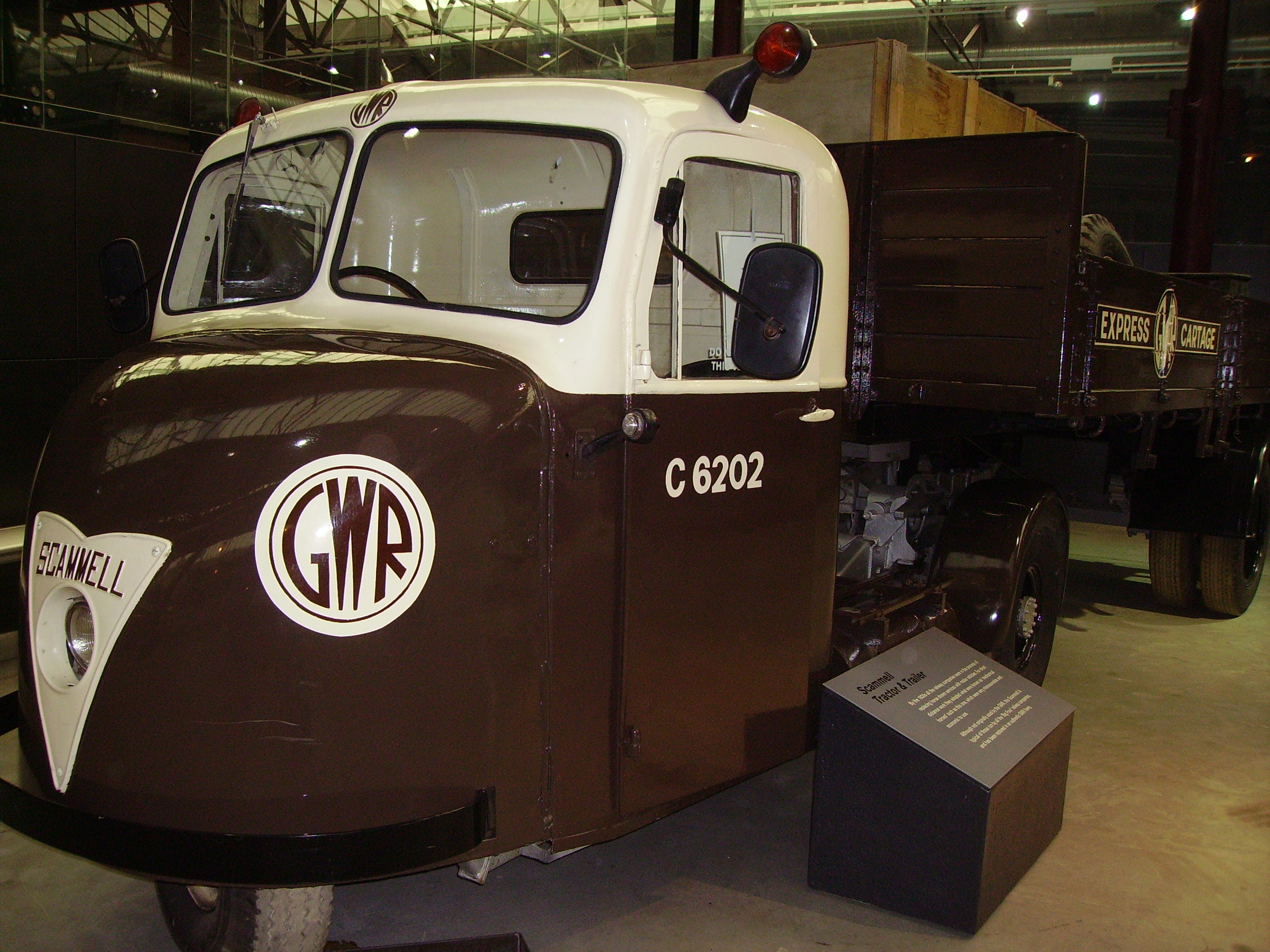
Scammell Scarab in Great Western Railway livery

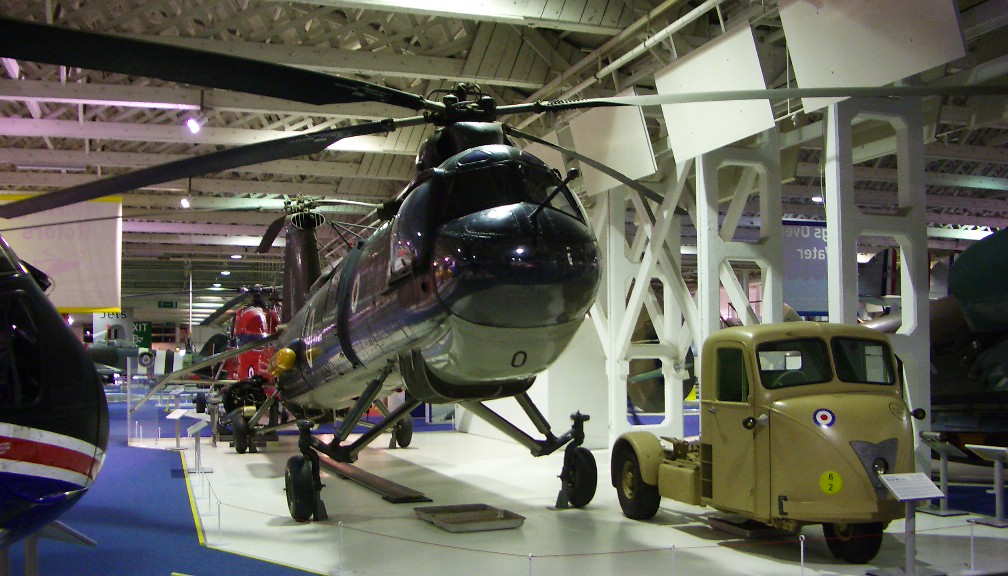
Royal Air Force Scammell Scarab

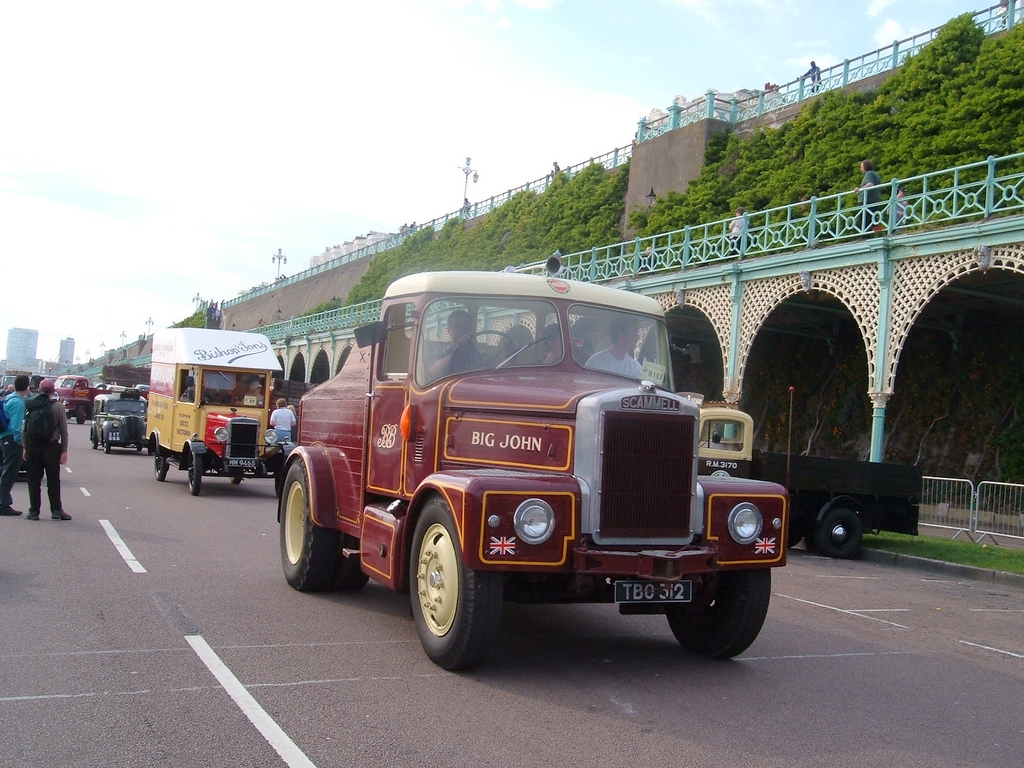
Scammell Highwayman ballast tractor (built 1959)

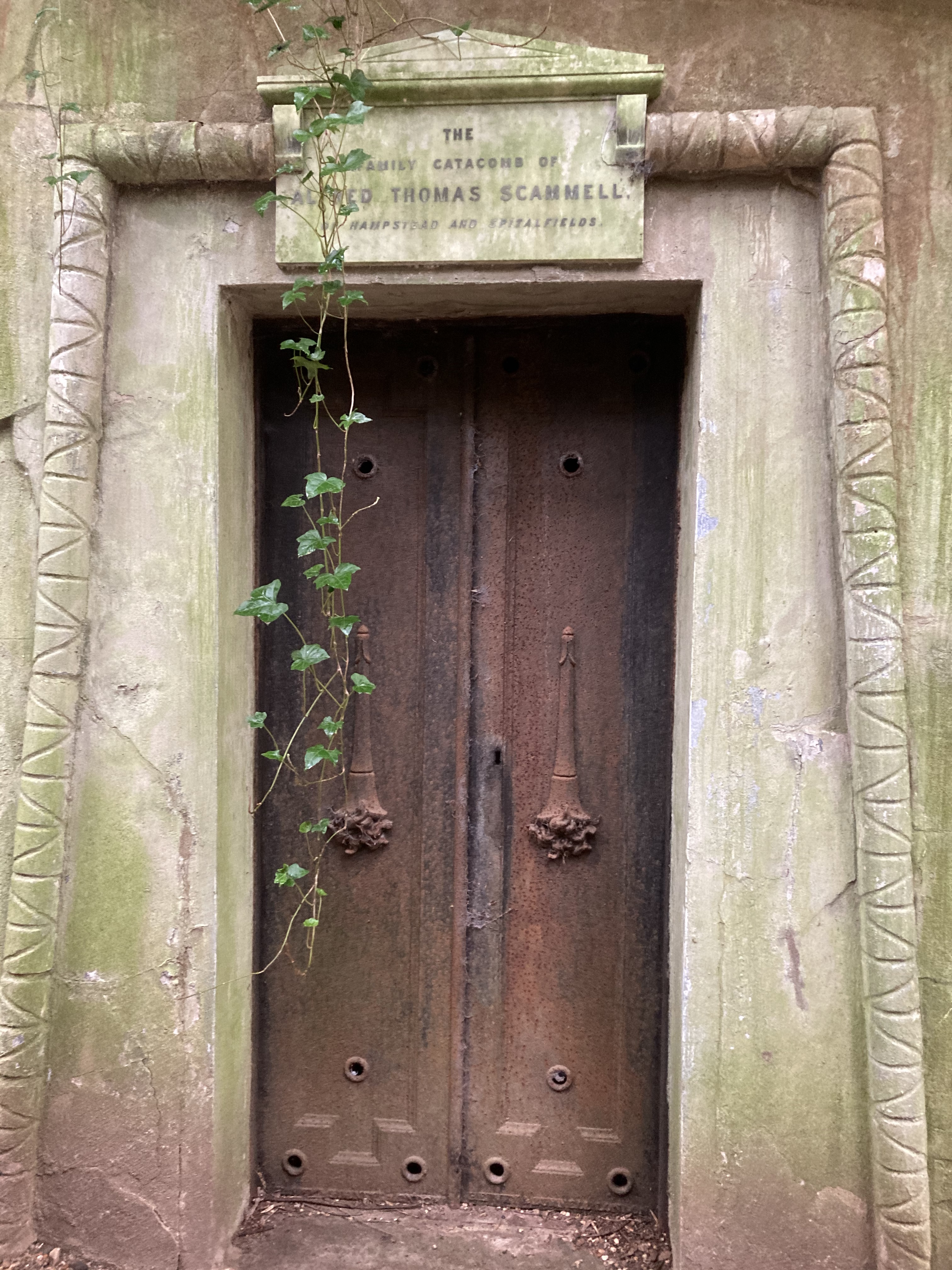
The Scammell family vault in the Egyptian Avenue in Highgate Cemetery (west side)

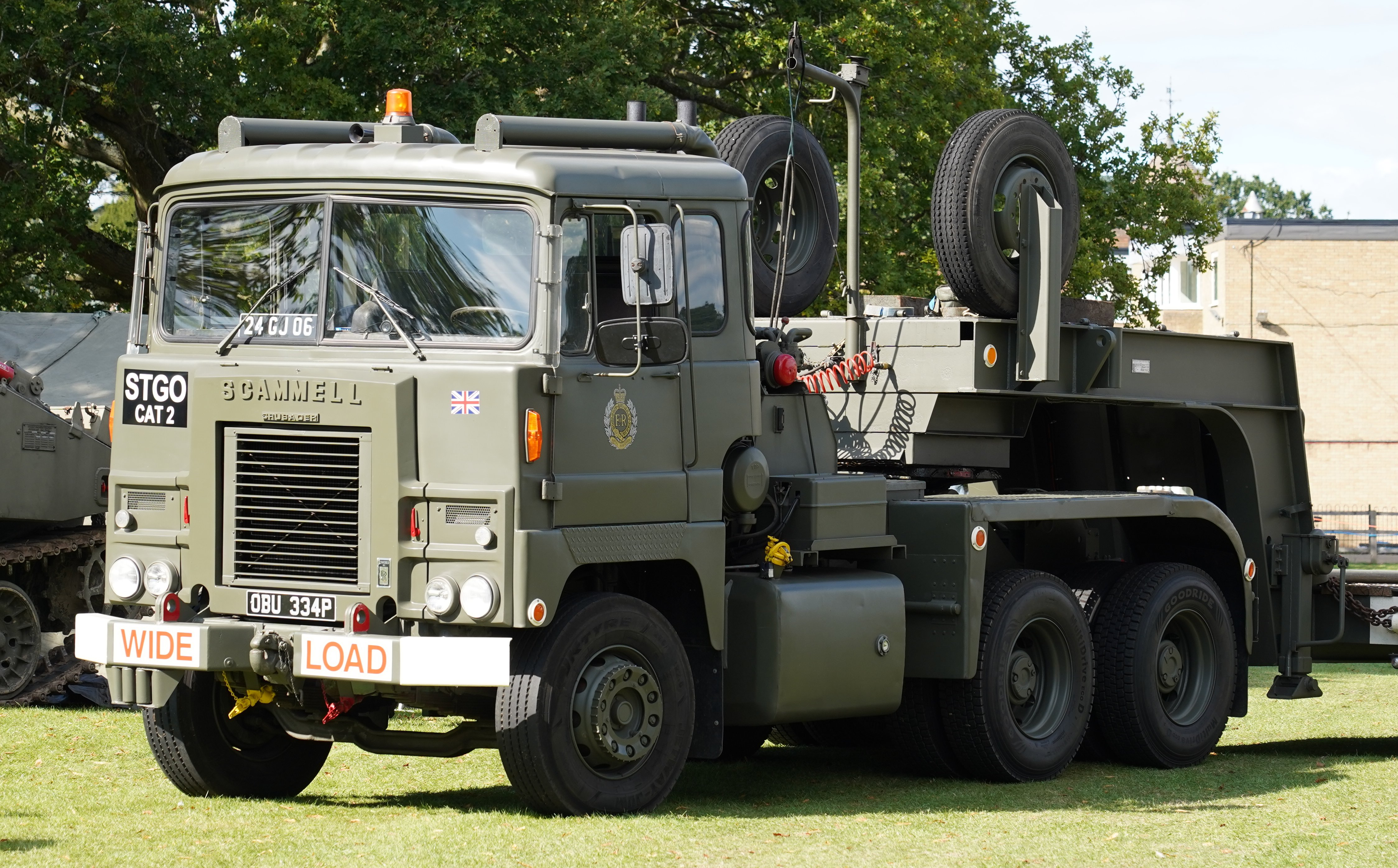
Scammell Crusader

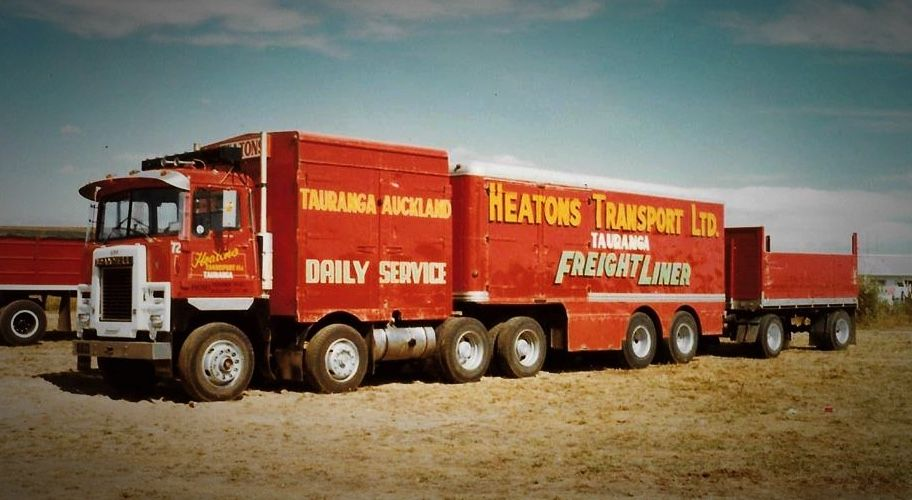
Scammell Crusader in New Zealand

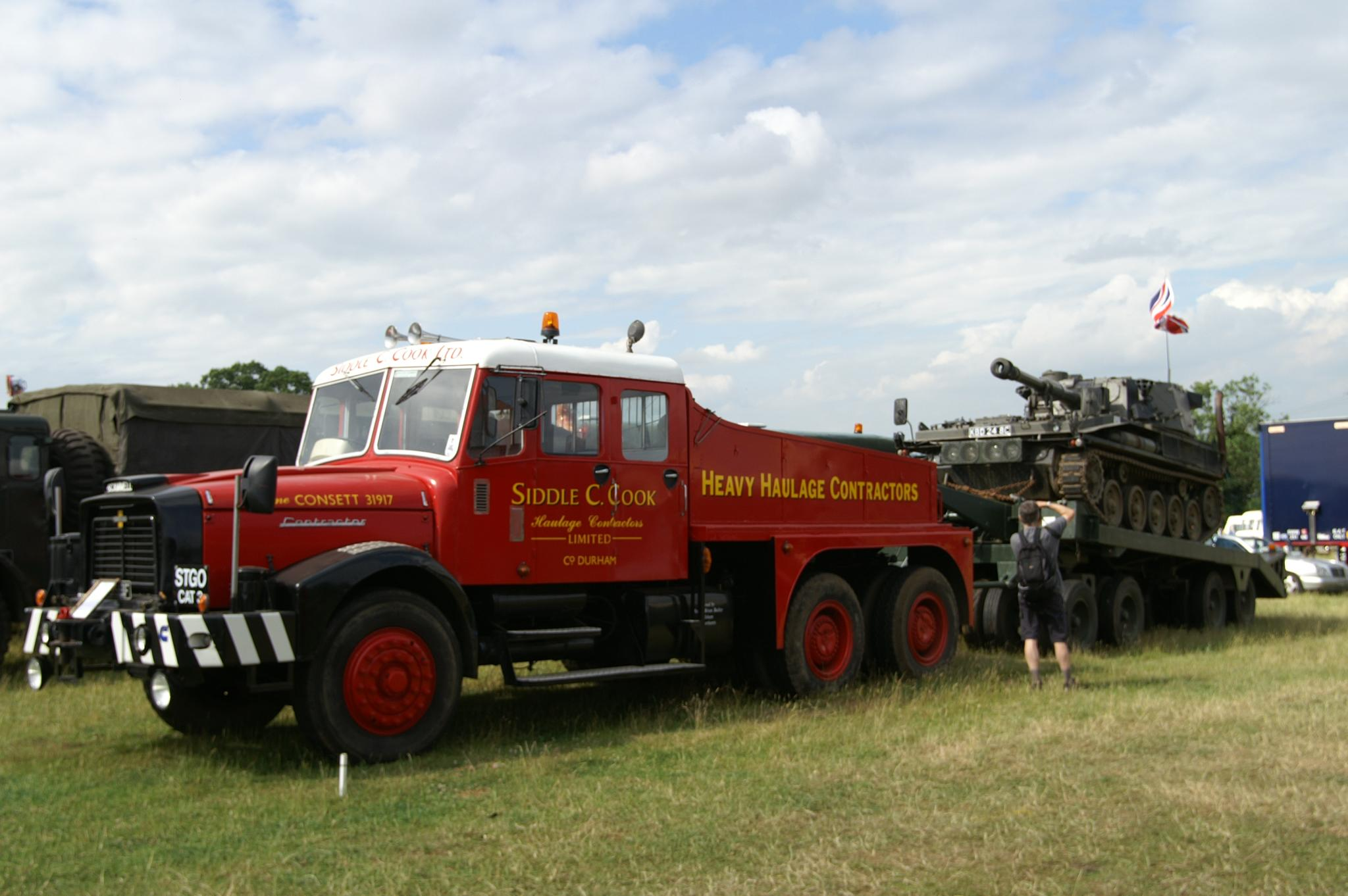
Scammell Contractor ballast tractor

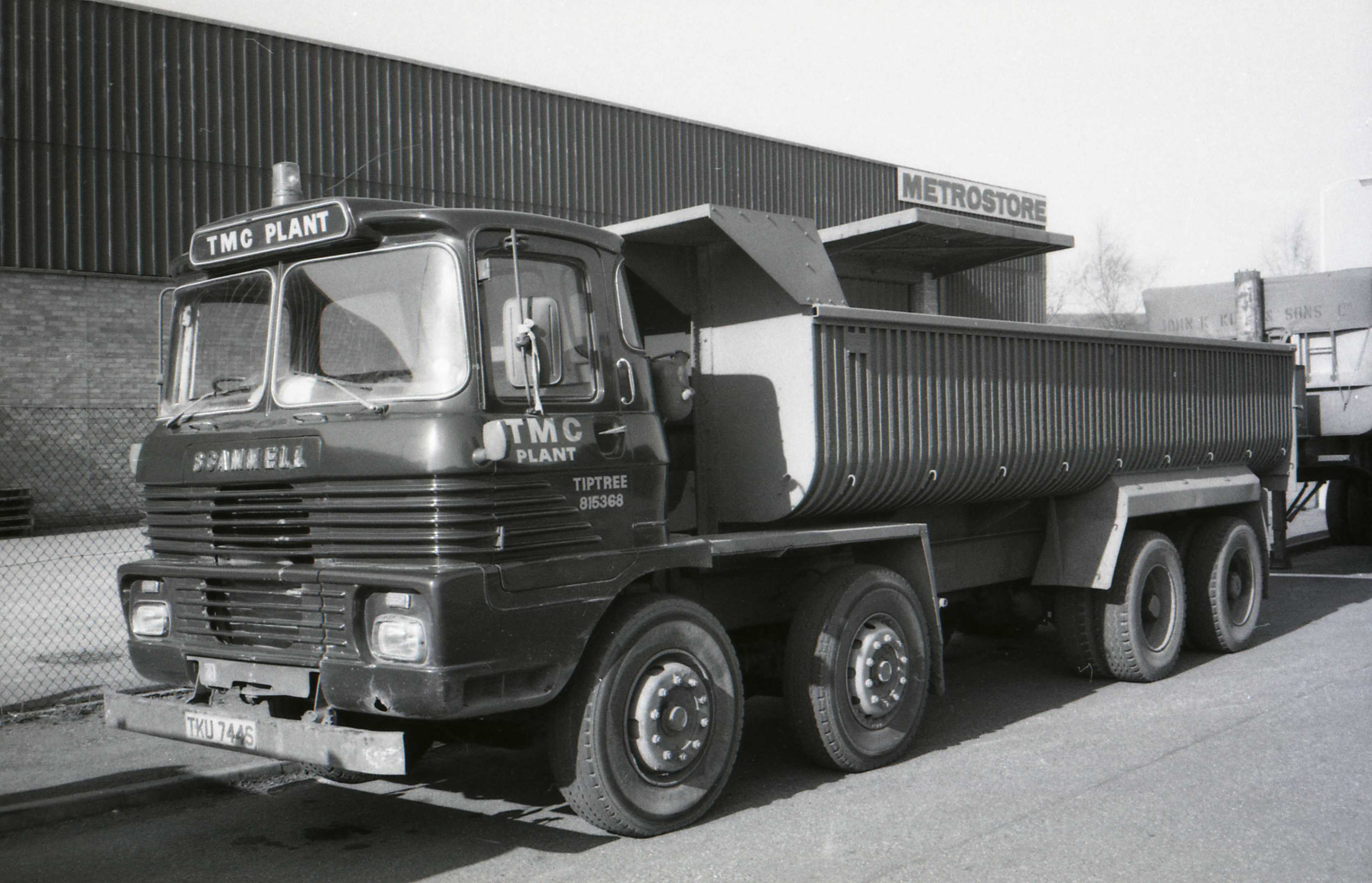
Scammell Routeman tipper

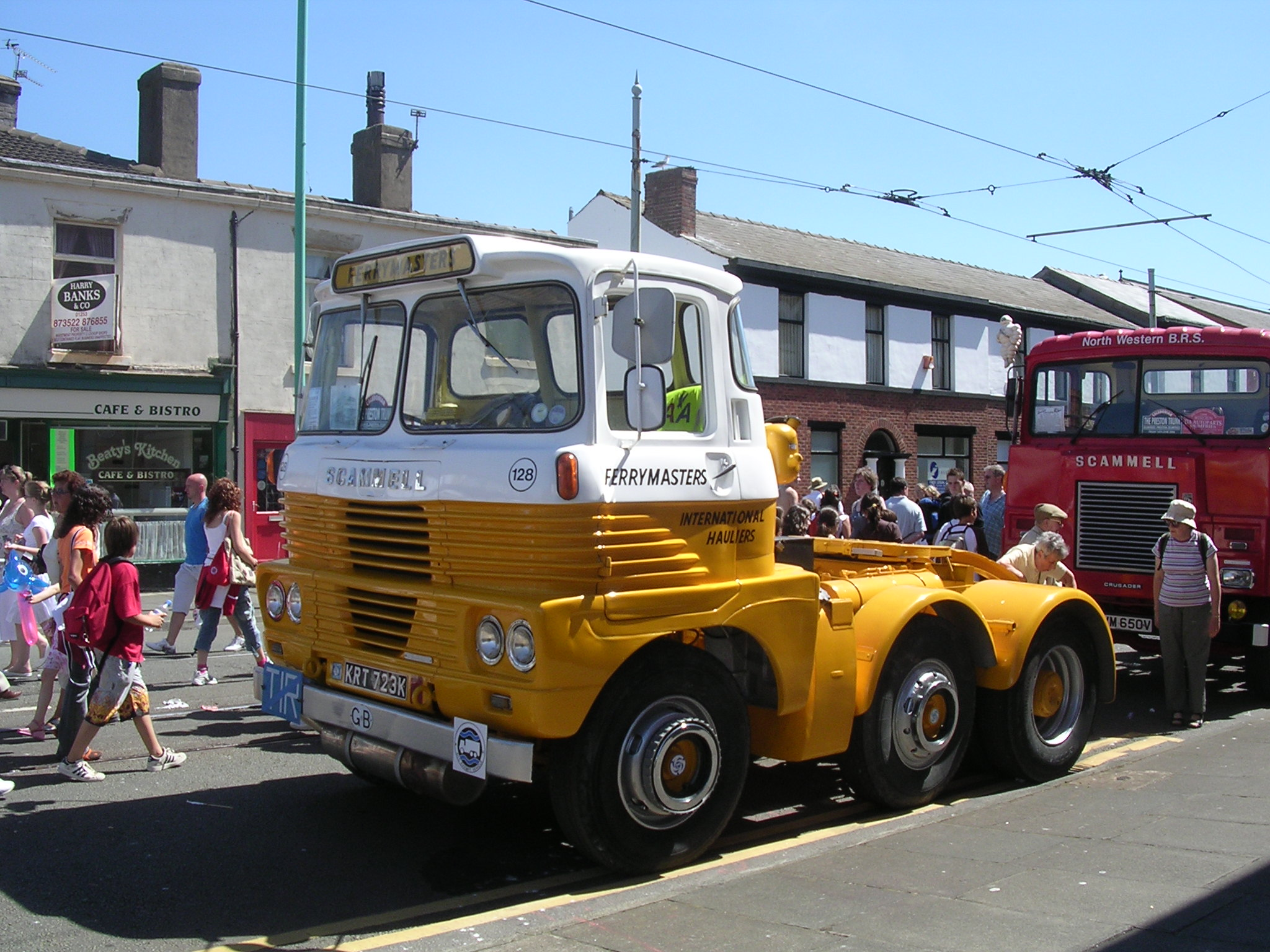
Scammell Trunker tractor

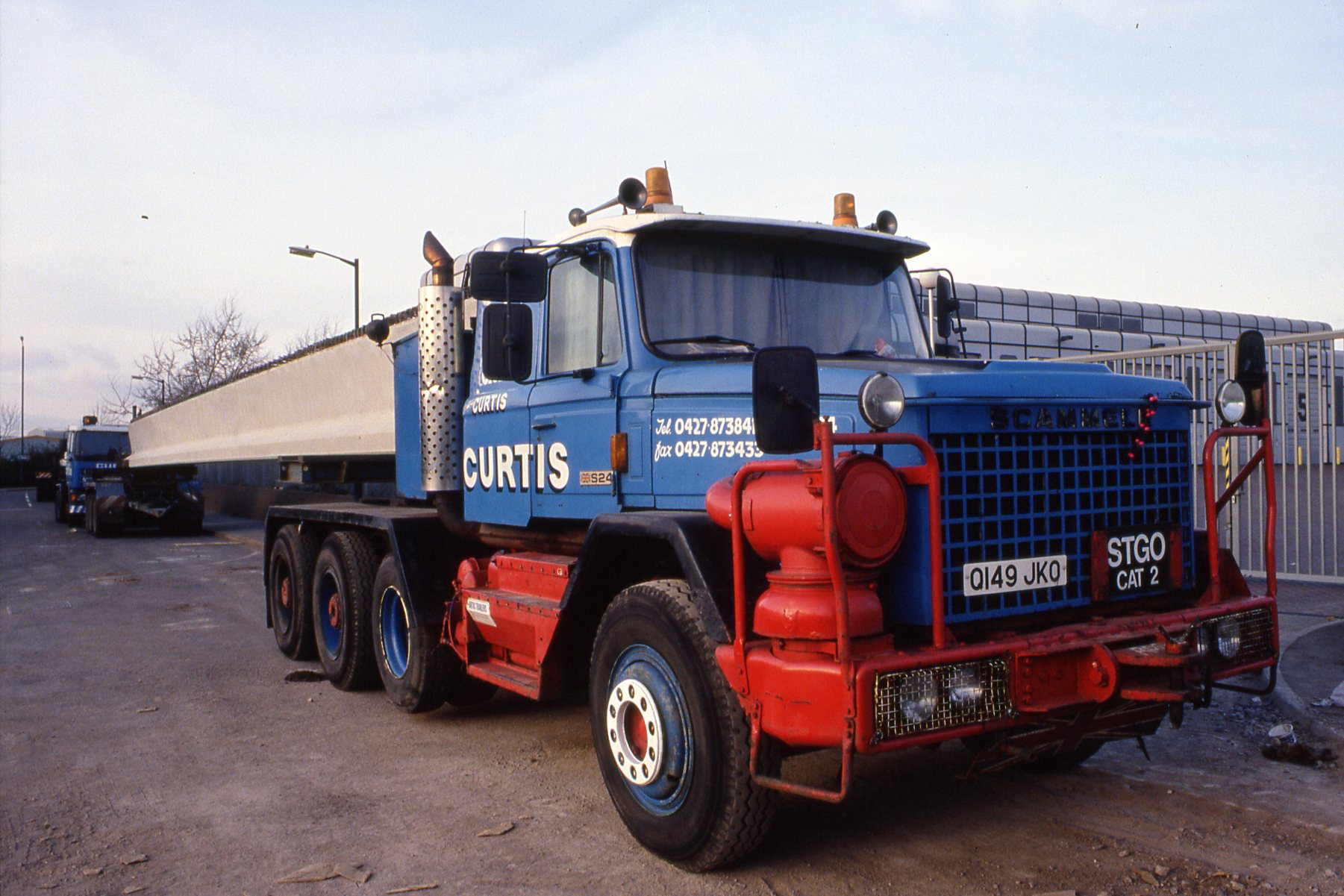
Scammell S24 heavy haulage tractor

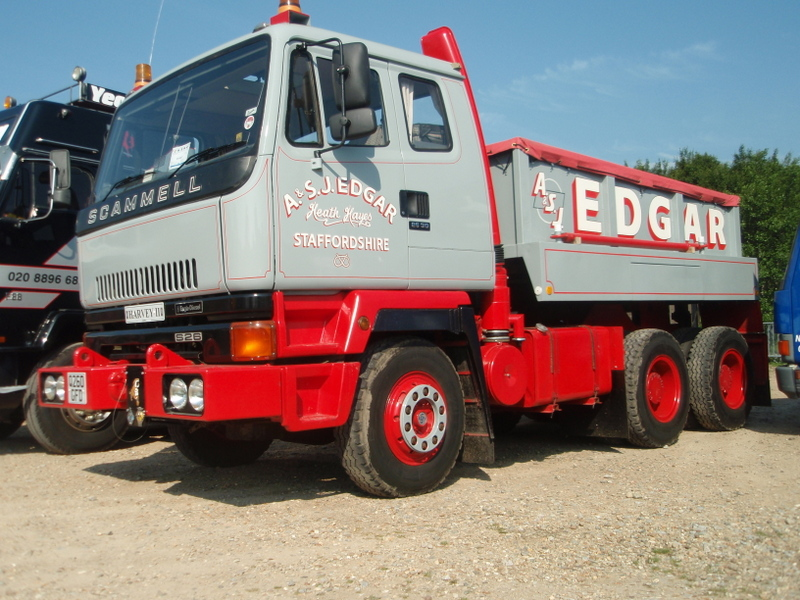
Scammell S26 ballast tractor

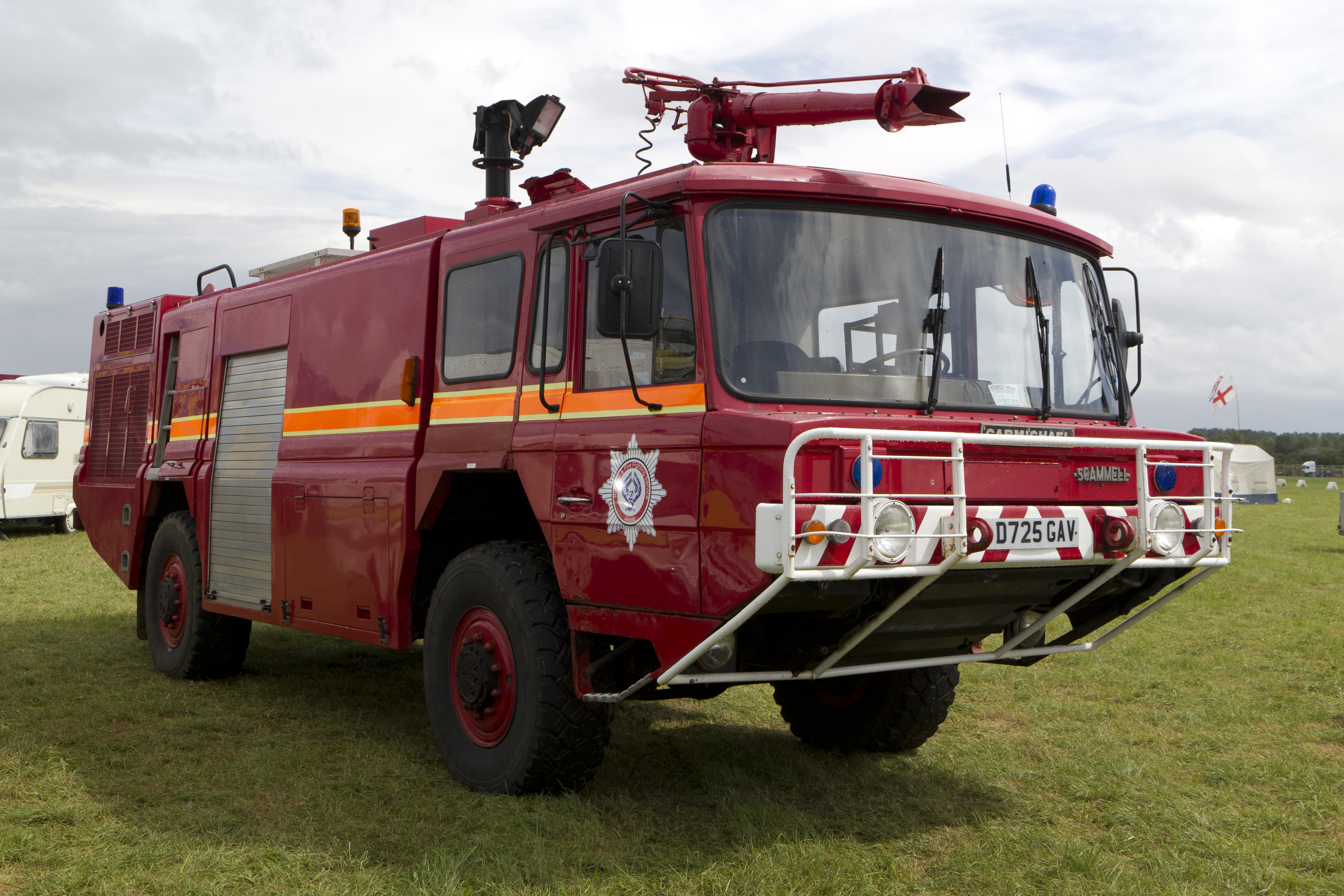
Scammell Nubian based Thorneycroft Mk10 ARFF
