= Scammell Commander =

British tractor unit

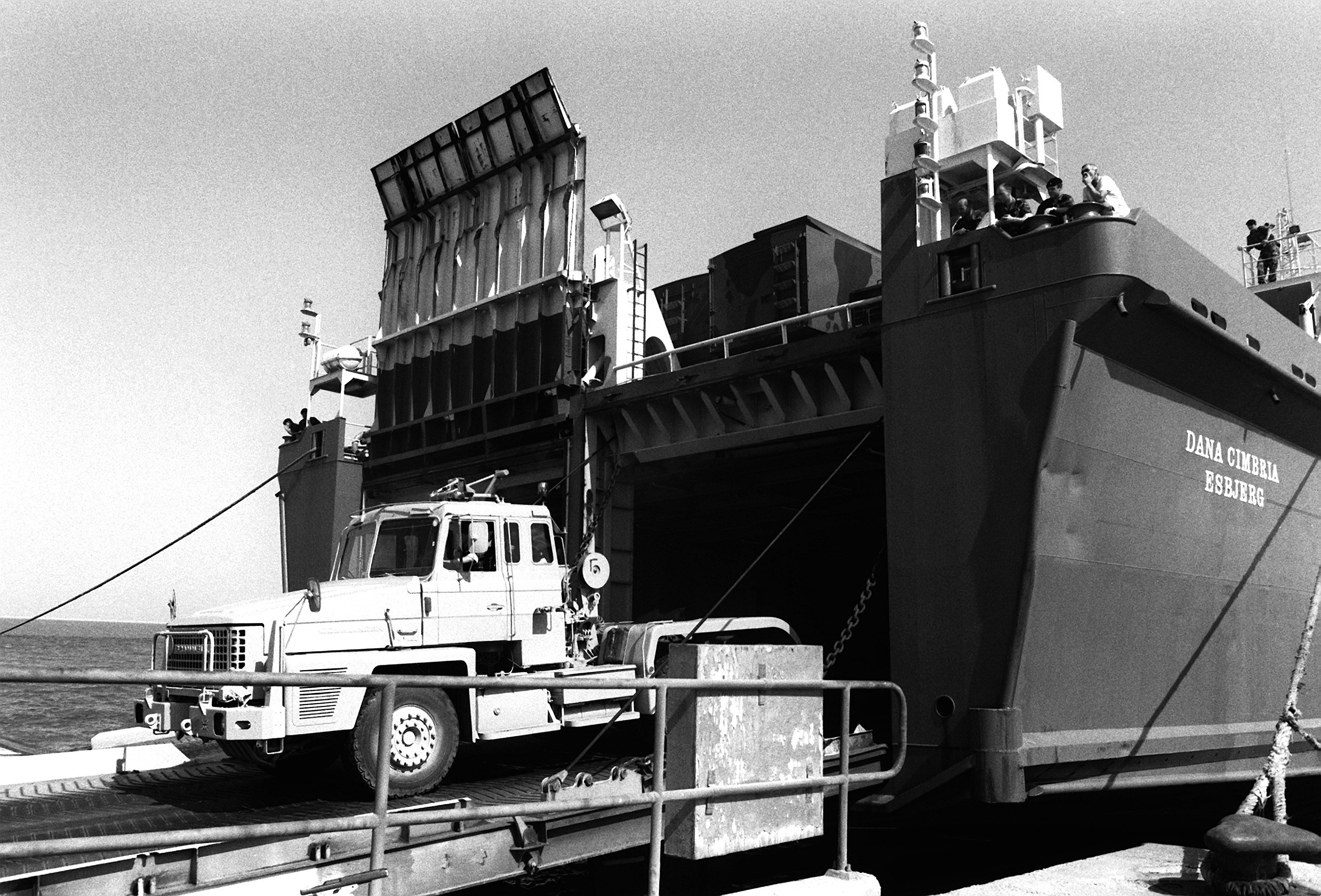
- Scammell Commander at King Abdulaziz Naval Base in October 1990

Overview
- Manufacturer: Scammell
- Production: 1983 - 1985

Body and chassis
- Class: Tractor unit
- Layout: 6×4

Powertrain
- Engine: Perkins CV12

The Scammell Commander was a heavy equipment transporter manufactured by Scammell for the Royal Corps of Transport. It is a tank transporter of UK origin, developed mid 1970s to succeed the Thornycroft Antar in UK military service. It entered service in 1984 and between 1983 and 1985, 125 were built with the Royal Corps of Transport being the sole customer.

Most were operated with the British Army of the Rhine by 7 Tank Transporter Regiment, Royal Corps of Transport, in West Germany, with only a few in the United Kingdom. They were extensively used in the Gulf War in the early 1990s. All were replaced by Oshkosh M1070s in the 2000s.
