= Scammell Routeman =

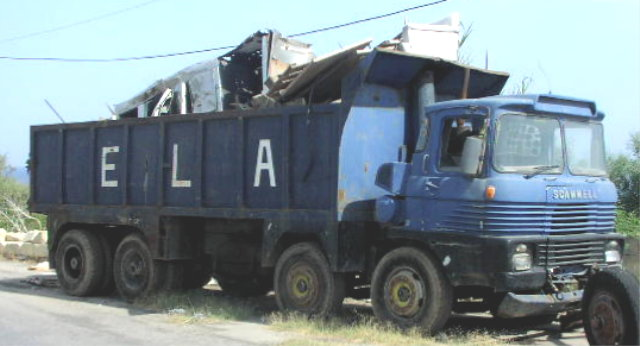

Overview
- Manufacturer: Scammell
- Production: 1959 - 1980

Body and chassis
- Layout: 8x4

Powertrain
- Engine: Gardner; Leyland

The Scammell Routeman was a truck manufactured by Scammell.

== History ==
The Scammell Routeman was an 8x4 truck manufactured by Scammell. Based on a Leyland Octopus chassis, the Routeman I was launched November 1959. It had a production run of just under 100.

The Routeman II was launched 1963 with 1,200 produced. The Routeman III had a production run of 4,800. It was supersed by the Constructor 8 in 1980.

It was available with engines from Gardner and Leyland.
