= 48th (South Midland) Signal Regiment =

South Midland Divisional Telegraph Company 48th (South Midland) Divisional Signals 48 (South Midland) Signal Regiment 48 (City of Birmingham) Signal Squadron
- Badge of the Royal Corps of Signals
- Active: 1861–present
- Country: United Kingdom
- Branch: Territorial Army
- Role: Signals
- Part of: 48th (South Midland) Division; Southern Command; 35 (South Midlands) Signal Regiment; 37 Signal Regiment.
- Garrison/HQ: Birmingham
- Engagements: World War I: Western Front; Italian Front; World War II: Battle of France; Tunisian Campaign; Italian Campaign

48 (South Midland) Signal Regiment was a Territorial Army (TA) unit of the British Army's Royal Corps of Signals from 1920. It had its origins in a Volunteer unit of the Royal Engineers formed in 1861 and provided the communications for several infantry divisions during World War II. Postwar, it went through a number of reorganisations. Its successor still serves as a squadron in today's Army Reserve.

== Royal Engineers ==
When the old Volunteer Force was subsumed into the Territorial Force (TF) after the Haldane reforms in 1908, the 2nd Gloucestershire (The Bristol Engineer Volunteer Corps) Royal Engineers (originally formed at Bristol on 10 April 1861 by employees of the Bristol and Exeter Railway) provided the Royal Engineers (RE) components of the TF's South Midland Division, including the South Midland Divisional Telegraph Company, with the following organisation:

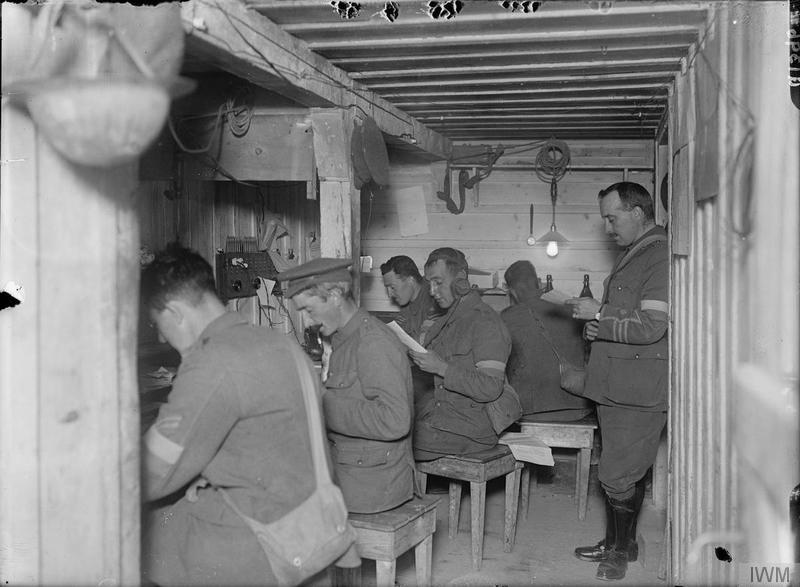
RE Signal Company at work in a dugout on the Western Front.

- Company Headquarters (HQ) at 32 Park Row, Bristol
- No 1 Section at 32 Park Row
- No 2 (Warwickshire) Section at Warwick, attached to the Warwickshire Brigade
- No 3 (Gloucester & Worcester) Section at Cheltenham, attached to the Gloucester & Worcester Brigade
- No 4 (South Midland) Section at Oxford, attached to the South Midland Brigade

Nos 2–4 Sections were largely manned by the three infantry brigades to which they were attached. The Telegraph Company was redesignated a Signal Company in 1911.

The South Midland Division mobilised on the outbreak of World War I in August 1914, and went to its war stations round Chelmsford in Essex. Shortly after mobilisation, the TF was invited to volunteer for overseas service and the formation of a reserve or 2nd Line unit was authorised for each unit where 60 per cent or more of the men had volunteered. The titles of these 2nd Line units were distinguished by a '2/' prefix, including the 2/1st South Midland Divisional Signal Company in the 61st (2nd South Midland) Division.

=== 48th (South Midland) Divisional Signals, RE ===
The 1st South Midland Division embarked for France at the end of March 1915 to join the British Expeditionary Force (BEF) and took its place in the line of the Western Front. It was designated the 48th (South Midland) Division in May. For the 'Big Push' of 1916, (the Battle of the Somme) all signal companies spent three months in preparing new cable communications; the Division fought through the Somme until November. During periods of action, signal lines were constantly cut by shellfire, and any advance required the rapid installation of additional lines. The German withdrawal to the Hindenburg Line (Operation Alberich) in Spring 1917 created a devastated area over which new communications had to be installed, and the divisional cable wagons came into their own. Later in the year 48th (SM) Division took part in several phases of the Third Battle of Ypres. By now, divisional signal companies had added a section for the Royal Artillery, which previously handled its own communications, and the number of infantry signallers attached to brigade signal sections was increased.

In November 1917, 48th (SM) Division was ordered to the Italian Front. At first, the British forces in Italy were dependent on the local civil telephone system, which had been badly disrupted by the war. In June 1918, the division was closely engaged in the fighting on the Asiago Plateau, where cables were difficult to install and wireless was more widely used than on the Western Front. At the conclusion of the Battle of Vittorio Veneto, 48th (SM) Division led the pursuit into Austrian territory until the Armistice of Villa Giusti came into effect on 3 November.

=== 61st (2nd South Midland) Divisional Signals, RE ===
Training for 61st (2nd South Midland) Division was badly delayed by lack of equipment. The division embarked for France during May 1916. Unlike its 1st Line, which had a year's experience of trench warfare before its first major action, 61st (2nd SM) Division was thrown into the disastrous Battle of Fromelles just seven weeks after arrival. It later served during the German retreat to the Hindenburg Line and the Third Battle of Ypres. In December 1917, it helped to fight off the German counter-attacks after the Battle of Cambrai.

The opening of the German spring offensive on 21 March found 61st (2nd SM) Division holding the line in front of St Quentin. The BEF had introduced a new system of defence in depth, but this was still incomplete, particularly the essential buried cable communications, and surface lines were quickly cut by the massive German bombardment. The forward positions were quickly cut off, and morning mist made visual communication impossible. However, though heavily attacked, 61st Division managed to keep its 'battle zone' intact for most of the day. But by the next day, 61st (2nd SM) Division was being pushed south-westwards away from its neighbouring division, the RE field companies were destroying bridges and the signals company was extemporising communications with whatever cable was left. The division fell back to the defences of the 'Green Line', which were barely started. By 23 March, the badly mauled 61st (2nd SM) Division was in reserve during the actions at the Somme Crossings, though individual units were still engaged. The division was withdrawn and sent to the quiet area of the Lys front. This sector was where the second phase of the German offensive, the Battle of the Lys fell on 9 April, and 61st (2nd SM) Division came into action on 11 April (the Battle of Estaires. It was committed piecemeal, and command had to be improvised. It fought on through the Battle of Hazebrouck (12–15 April) and the Battle of Béthune (18 April).

The Allies launched their Hundred Days Offensive on 8 August, but 61st (2nd SM) Division did not return to the fighting until its final stages, joining the pursuit on 2 October and participating in the Battle of the Selle on 24–25 October, and the Battle of Valenciennes on 1–2 November. In this phase of mobile warfare, divisional signals had to rely on vulnerable cables strung from by cable wagons (which had hardly been used during static trench warfare), or small cable barrows over the shell holes of the old battlefields, and infantry brigade communications were especially hampered. Much re-use of captured German cable and poles was employed, and corps cavalry and bicycle units had to be used to supplement the limited number of dispatch riders. Wireless sections had been increased in August, allowing signal companies to man stations as far forward as battalion HQs. Hostilities on the Western Front ended with the Armistice with Germany on 11 November.

=== Southern Command Signals ===
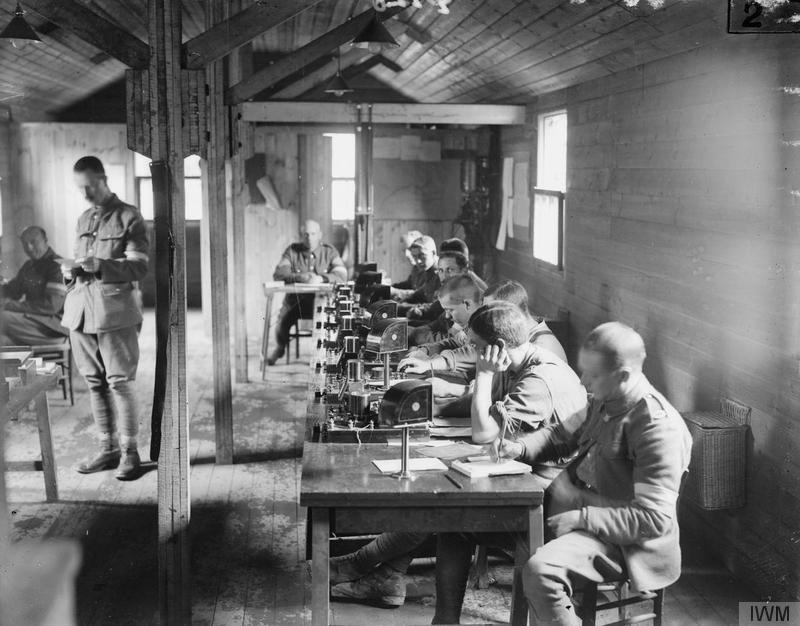
RE signal exchange station during World War I.

The other component of the future signal regiment was the RE Signal Companies raised in Birmingham for Southern Command in 1908: (Note: One source suggests that this unit was derived from the Birmingham Electrical Engineers, but if such a unit existed, it did not appear in the Army List or the London Gazette at the time of the TF's formation.)

- Southern Command Signal Companies at The Barracks, Great Brook Street, Birmingham
- Southern Wireless Signal Company
- Southern Cable Signal Company
- Southern Airline Signal Company

On the outbreak of World War I, the Southern Signal Companies were formed into the RE Signals Depot at Fenny Stratford. Although the companies did not see active service themselves, they raised a number of new signal units that served in various theatres of the war, beginning with a Southern Motor Airline Section that embarked for the Western Front on 10 November 1914.

== Royal Corps of Signals ==
In 1920, the RE Signal Service became the independent Royal Corps of Signals (RCS) and 48th (South Midland) Divisional Signals (Note: Divisional signal units of the Royal Signals 1920–45 were battalion-sized and commanded by a Lieutenant-Colonel or Major; they were not termed 'regiments' until 1946.) was formed in the new corps as part of the Territorial Army (TA), which replaced the TF in 1921. It was established at The Barracks, Great Brook Street, Birmingham, moving in the 1930s to Cateswell House, Stratford Road, in Hall Green, Birmingham.

The Worcestershire Cadet Signal Company of the RCS was affiliated to the unit.

48th (SM) Divisional Signals comprised Nos 1–3 Companies with Nos 2 and 3 Wireless Sections attached. The RCS also carried out some signal functions for the Royal Artillery: by 1927, the unit had a number of these sections attached to it at Great Brook Street:

- 228th Field Artillery Signal Section
- 229th Field Artillery Signal Section
- 209th Medium Artillery Signal Section

By the 1930s, it also had two attached Supplementary Reserve sections providing communications for the Royal Air Force:

- No 2 (South Midland) Air Wing Signal Section
- No 1 (South Midland) Air Force Port Depot Signal Section

The unit was mechanised by 1932.

== World War II ==
=== Mobilisation ===
When the TA was doubled in size in early 1939 after the Munich Crisis, the division once again formed a duplicate, 61st Division, for which the signals split to form 61st Divisional Signals. The TA mobilised on 1 September 1939, just before the outbreak of war, with 48th (SM) Division and 61st Division both in Southern Command.

=== Organisation ===
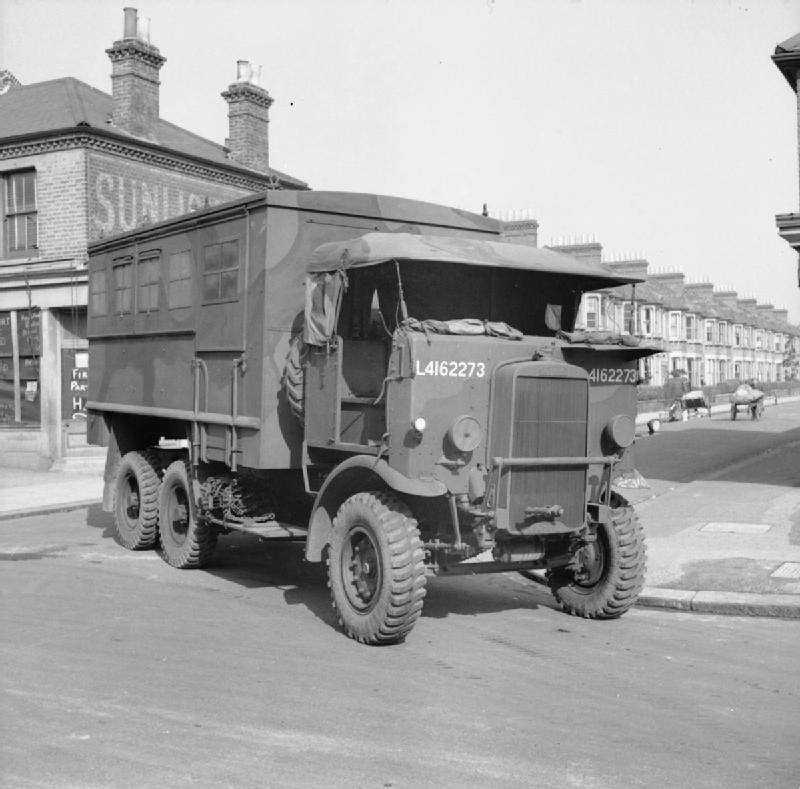
Leyland Retriever wireless lorry, 1941.

In 1939, the organisation of an infantry divisional signal unit and the attachments of its subunits were as follows:

- HQ Company
  - Q Section – quartermasters
  - M Section – maintenance
- No 1 Company – Divisional HQ
  - A & C Sections – wireless
  - B Section – cable
  - D Section – despatch riders and cipher section
  - O Section – operating
- No 2 Company – divisional artillery
  - E, F & G Sections – individual artillery regiments
  - H Section – HQ divisional artillery
- No 3 Company – infantry, reconnaissance and RE
  - R Section – reconnaissance battalion
  - J, K & L Sections – individual infantry brigades

=== 48th (South Midland) Divisional Signals ===
48th (SM) Divisional insignia adopted in 1940.

==== Battle of France ====
48th (SM) Division moved to France in January 1940 to join the British Expeditionary Force (BEF). When the German offensive began with the invasion of the Low Countries on 10 May, the BEF advanced into Belgium under Plan D, and soon its leading divisions were in place on the River Dyle. However, the Germans had broken through in the Ardennes and the BEF was forced to retreat back to the line of the Escaut. The division was heavily engaged on 21 May, holding back German attempts o cross the river.

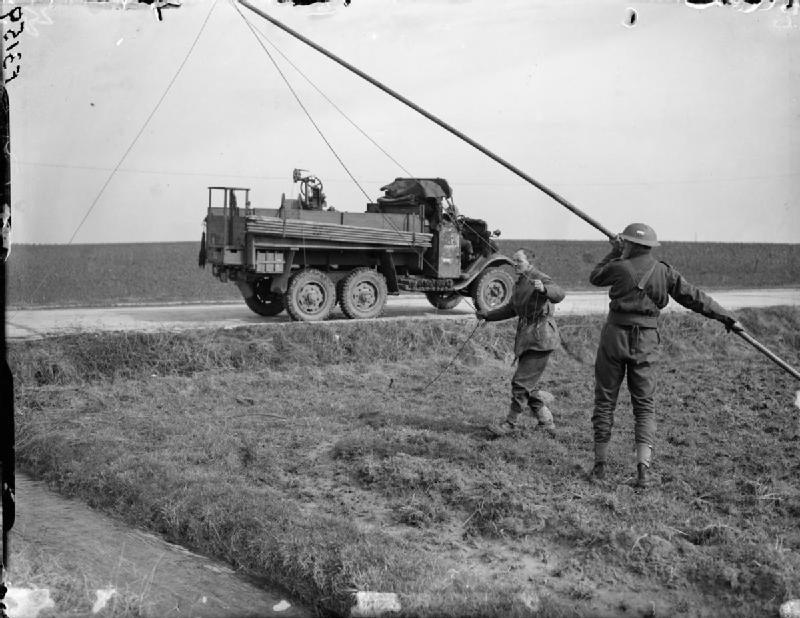
Royal Signals erecting cable across a road in France, 1940.

However, the German breakthrough from the Ardennes had reached the sea and the BEF was cut off. The division was among the forces pulled out of the east-facing Escaut line to form a west-facing line along a series of canals in the Bergues–Cassel–Hazebrouck area covering the approaches to Dunkirk, where the division arrived on 25 May. Next day the decision was made to evacuate the BEF from Dunkirk (Operation Dynamo), and forces in the 'pocket' in which the BEF was now confined were progressively pulled into the Dunkirk perimeter. 48th (SM) Division held a series of delaying positions before moving into the bridgehead. Although most vehicles had to be destroyed, signal units were permitted to move their wireless vehicles and despatch riders into the perimeter to maintain communications, and a skeleton wireless service was maintained to the end. 48th (SM) Division was embarked on 30 May.

==== Home Defence ====
On return to the UK, 48th (SM) Division reformed in South West England and was slowly re-equipped. It remained training in VIII Corps in South West England until late 1941, when it transferred to Lincolnshire in I Corps District. From November 1941, 48th (SM) Division was placed on a lower establishment, indicating that it was no longer intended for overseas service. It did, however, supply trained units to other formations. 48th (SM) Divisional Signals provided the HQ, commanding officer (CO), and No 1 Company for a new 78th Divisional Signals.

48th (SM) Division, including the remainder of its divisional signals, remained in Home Forces for the rest of the war.

==== Commanders ====
The following officers commanded 48th (SM) Divisional Signals:

- Lt-Col J.W. Danielson, DSO, TD, 1920
- Lt-Col P.H. Keeling, MC, TD, 1924
- Lt-Col W. Martineau, MC, TD, 1929
- Lt-Col M.E. Holdsworth, 1933
- Lt-Col P.H. Jones, MC, TD, 1937
- Lt-Col R.W. Morgan, 1941
- Lt-Col J.C. Rau, 1941
- Lt-Col R, Maguire, 1942
- Lt-Col J.L. Lilley, TD, 1944
- Lt-Col G.B. McKean, 1945

=== 61st Divisional Signals ===
61st Divisional insignia.

After the outbreak of war, 61st Division trained in Southern Command. Suddenly, on 15 April 1940, the divisional commander and his staff were detached to form HQ 'Mauriceforce' for service in the Norwegian Campaign. However, communications for Mauriceforce were handled by a detachment of 49th (West Riding) Divisional Signals, which had already been sent to Norway. The rest of 61st Division never served outside the United Kingdom. It was sent to Northern Ireland in June 1940 during the post-Dunkirk invasion crisis, remaining there until February 1943.

61st Division did appear in 21st Army Group's proposed order of battle in the summer of 1943, but it was later replaced by veteran formations brought back from the Mediterranean theatre before Operation Overlord was launched. It remained in reserve in the UK at full establishment.

==== Commanders ====
The following officers commanded 61st Divisional Signals:

- Lt-Col W.A. James, TD, 1939
- Lt-Col F.R. Booth, 1942
- Lt-Col J.E.S. Walford, 1944
- Lt-Col J.M.S. Tulloch, OBE, 1945
- Lt-Col J.E.S. Walford, 1945

=== 78th Divisional Signals ===
78th Division's 'Battleaxe' insignia.

78th 'Battleaxe' Division was a new formation created for the Allied invasion of North Africa (Operation Torch). Divisional HQ began to form on 25 May 1942, and 78th Divisional Signals joined on 15 June 1942. The division consisted of three independent infantry brigades that had already been assigned to Force 110 (which became First Army in July 1942); the supporting arms were transferred from training divisions such as 48th (SM) Division.

==== Tunisia ====
The division sailed on 16 October and 11th Infantry Brigade (including its HQ and signals) carried out the first 'Torch' landing near Algiers at 01.00 on 8 November. The rest of the division followed on 12 November, and it took part in the drive eastwards towards Tunisia. Communications were maintained by radio and by requisitioning the local civilian telephone system. By 24 November, the division was fighting Axis troops around Medjez el Bab and Tebourba. The enemy counter-attacked strongly at Tebourba Gap, and First Army was unable to take Tunis in 1942.

After building up their forces during the winter, the Allies launched their offensive against Tunis in April with preparatory operations by 78th Division at Oued Zarga (7–15 April) including the assaults on Longstop Hill, followed by fighting in the Medjez Plain (23–30 April). The final attack (Operation Vulcan) was launched on 5 May and the Axis forces in Tunisia surrendered on 12 May.

==== Sicily ====
78th Division was in reserve for the Allied invasion of Sicily (Operation Husky), which began on 9/10 July; the division itself did not land until 26 July. It then went into action in the Battle of Centuripe (31 July–3 August) and then fought its way past the west end of Mount Etna. The Axis forces evacuated Sicily on 7 August.

==== Italy ====
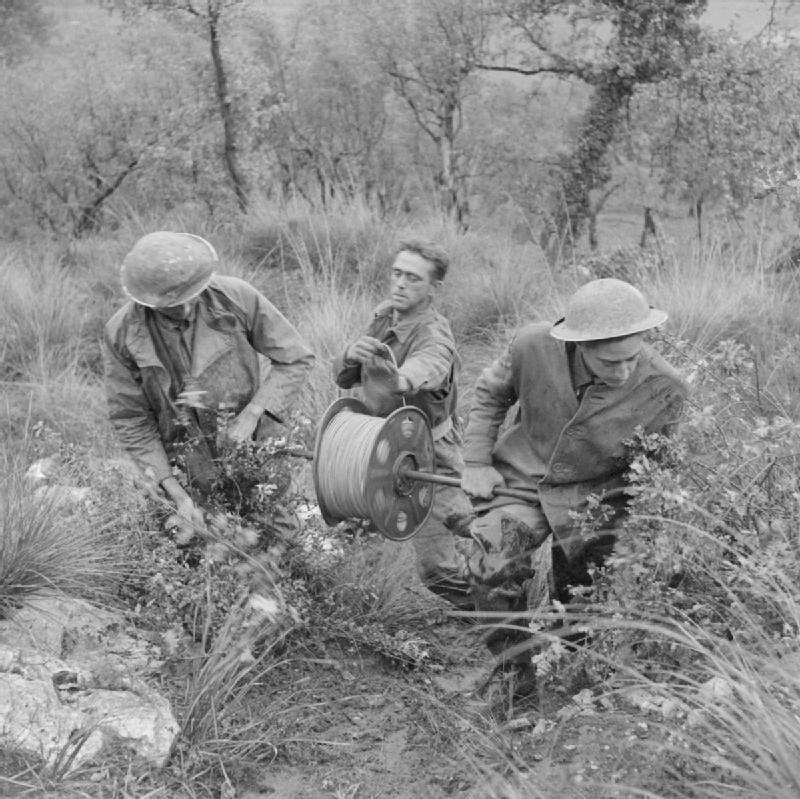
Royal Signals laying telephone wire in the Italian mountains, 1943.

The Allies followed up with landings on mainland Italy, and had made good progress by the time 78th Division began disembarking at the captured port of Bari on 22 September. It took part in the fighting at the crossings of the Trigno in October and the Sangro in November. After rest, the division was switched to the western side of Italy to join the fighting round Monte Cassino. It took part on the final Battle of Monte Cassino (Operation Diadem, 11–18 May 1944) and the subsequent fighting in the Liri Valley as far as Alatri. It then participated in the pursuit to Lake Trasimene.

Allied Armies in Italy (AAI) had a policy of rotating British divisions from Italy to Middle East Command for extended rest and reorganisation. 78th Division embarked on 18 July 1944 and landed in Egypt on 23 July. It returned to Italy on 15 September. The roads were in bad shape and it took a long time to travel up to the line for the winter fighting, in which it took the hills above Bologna and pushed towards the Santerno.

When the Spring 1945 offensive in Italy (Operation Grapeshot) was launched on 9 April, 78th Division took part in the fighting on the Santerno and Senio rivers, and then carried out the breakout on 13 April that seized the Argenta Gap. In the subsequent pursuit it crossed the Po. Hostilities on the Italian front ended on 2 May with the Surrender of Caserta, and 78th Division entered Austria on 8 May to begin occupation duties.

==== Commanders ====
The following officers commanded 78th Divisional Signals:

- Lt-Col J.C. Rau, 1942
- Lt-Col W.A. Purser, 1944
- Lt-Col J.F. Shearer, 1945

== Postwar ==
=== I/20th (South Midland) Army Signal Regiment ===
When the TA was reconstituted on 1 January 1947, the 48th and 61st Divisional Signals were recombined and reorganised as 'X' Army Signal Regiment, designated from 1948 as I/20th (South Midland) Army Signal Regiment.

==== Commanders ====
The following officers commanded 1/20th (South Midland) Army Signal Rgt:

- Lt-Col D.G. Collins, MBE, TD
- Lt-Col E.R. Price, TD, 1950
- Lt-Col R.N. Houston, MBE, TD, 1954

=== 48 (South Midland) Signal Regiment ===
In 1959 the regiment was redesignated 48 (South Midland) Signal Regiment, and from 1961 it assumed district responsibilities under 48th (SM) Divisional/District HQ.

When the TA was reduced into the Territorial and Army Volunteer Reserve (TAVR) in 1967, the regiment was combined with 63 Signal Regiment to form a HQ and a single squadron.

=== 63 Signal Regiment ===
This regiment was formed at Wilton on 2 January 1947 to supervise a number of signal units in Southern Command:

- 90 (Field) Army Group Royal Artillery (AGRA) Signal Squadron, Reading, Berkshire – disbanded October 1956
- 91 (Field) AGRA Signal Squadron, Taunton – disbanded August 1950
- 100 (Anti-Aircraft) AGRA Signals, Southampton – transferred to Anti-Aircraft Command September 1948
- 4 Armoured Replacement Group Signals, Bristol – transferred to Army Emergency Reserve 1950
- 26 Engineer Brigade Signal Troop, Salisbury – disbanded in 1961
- 15 Wireless Squadron, Devonport, Plymouth – became 325 Signal Squadron
- (possibly) 17 Wireless Squadron, Portsmouth – became 327 Signal Squadron
- 10 Air Support Signal Unit (ASSU), Eastleigh – joined later in 1947; became 310 Signal Squadron

The regiment was designated 63 HQ Line of Communication Signal Regiment in 1948. As its subordinate units disappeared, the regiment took on a more conventional organisation from 1950:

- Regimental Headquarters (RHQ), Wilton – moved to Salisbury 11 October 1958
- 1 Squadron, Bournemouth – redesignated 4 United Kingdom Land Forces Reserve Signal Squadron 1954; moved to Reading by 1958
- 2 Squadron, Southampton
- 3 Squadron, Windsor, Berkshire and Basingstoke

The regiment took over responsibility for the eastern part of Southern Command's area and was redesignated 63 Command (Mixed) Signal Regiment on 6 March 1957 ('Mixed' indicating that members of the Women's Royal Army Corps (WRAC) were integrated into the unit), 63 (Mixed) Signal Regiment in 1959, and simply 63 Signal Regiment in 1961. By this time its organisation was:

- RHQ
- 1 Sqn, Reading, Basingstoke and Windsor
- 2 Sqn, Southampton
- 3 Sqn with WRAC Band, Southampton and Portsmouth
- 310 (ASSU) Signal Squadron
- 314 (UKLFR) Signal Squadron, Bournemouth – formed from 4 UKLF Reserve Signals

=== 48 (City of Birmingham) Signal Squadron ===
On 1 April 1967, the TAVR was formed: 48 and 63 Signal Regiments were amalgamated to form HQ Squadron at Sparkbrook, Birmingham, and 48 (City of Birmingham) Signal Squadron at Small Heath, Birmingham, in the new 35th (South Midlands) Signal Regiment. (The number 63 was reassigned to the former 322 SAS Signal Squadron.)

35 (South Midland) Signal Regiment was disbanded in 2009 but 48 (City of Birmingham) Signal Squadron continues in the Army Reserve as part of 37 Signal Regiment.

== Honorary Colonels ==
The following served as Honorary Colonel of the unit:

- G.H. Verity, MIEE
- Col J.W. Danielson, DSO, TD, former CO, appointed 16 July 1927
- Maj B.J.T. Ford, TD, appointed 16 July 1932
- Brig-Gen Sir Robert McCalmont, CVO, DSO, appointed 16 July 1937
- Brig Edward Antrobus, OBE, TD, served with 48th (SM) Divisional Signals) 1920–39 and 61st Divisional Signals 1939–44, Hon Col 1950–57
