= Leyland Beaver-Eel =

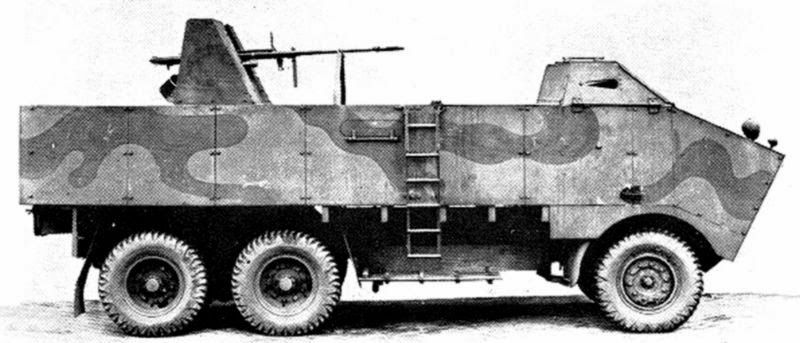
- Leyland Beaver-Eel
- Type: Improvised armoured truck
- Place of origin: United Kingdom

Service history
- In service: 1940 – 1945
- Used by: Royal Air Force
- Wars: World War II

Production history
- Designer: Leyland
- Designed: 1940
- Manufacturer: Leyland; Derby Carriage Works
- No. built: 336

Specifications
- Mass: ~9.8 long tons (10 metric tons)
- Length: 23 ft 7 in (7.2 m)
- Width: 7 ft 5 in (2.27 m)
- Height: 11 ft 4 in (3.45 m)
- Crew: 5-6
- Armour: 0.24 in (6 mm)
- Main armament: Varied, either: 1 × 20 mm (0.8 in) Hispano-Suiza HS.404 autocannon; 1 × 37 mm (1.5 in) COW autocannon
- Secondary armament: 2 × .303 Lewis machine guns (Note: An extra Lewis gun was usable from the cab.)
- Engine: 4-cyl. liquid cooled petrol engine, 360 cu in (5,900 cm^{3}); 73 hp (54 kW) at 2120 rpm
- Drive: 6×4
- Suspension: Leaf springs
- Fuel capacity: ~31 imp gal (141 L)
- Operational range: ~180 miles (290 km)
- Maximum speed: ~25 mph (40 km/h)

The Leyland Beaver-Eel, known officially as the Tender, Armoured, Leyland Type C, was an improvised armoured truck used by the Royal Air Force throughout World War II for airfield defence duties.

== Overview ==
The Leyland Beaver-Eel was one of several armoured vehicle types designed in 1940 on the orders of Lord Beaverbrook and Admiral Sir Edward Evans for the defence of Great Britain, as a part of the hasty measures taken by the British Government following the Dunkirk evacuation and the threat of invasion.

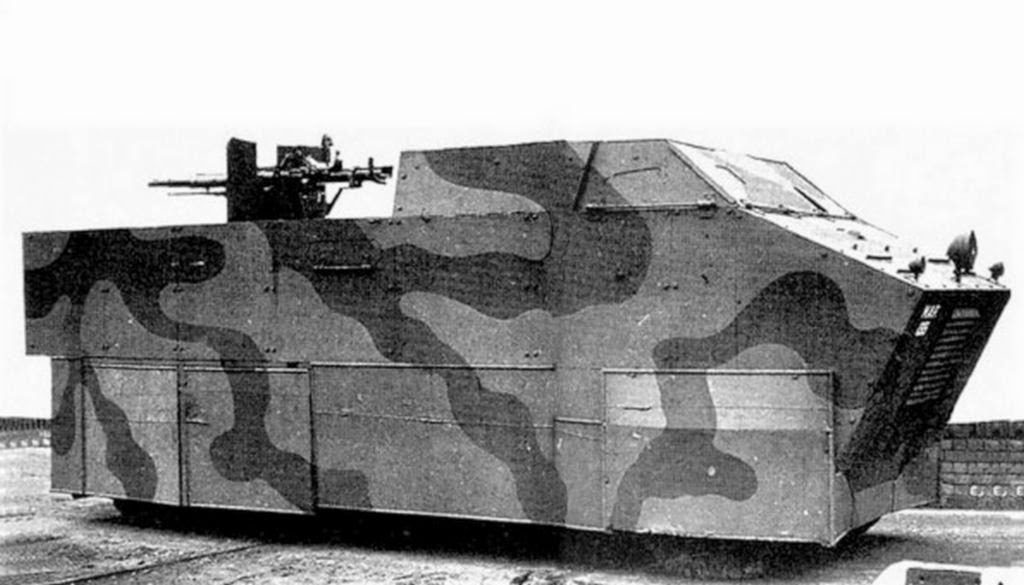
Beaver-Eel with armoured skirts, RAF markings can be seen.

The first prototype was designed, built, tested and approved, and deliveries of production vehicles commenced, all within 10 days of Admiral Evans’ visit to the Leyland Motors factory in June 1940. Leyland built 250 Beaver-Eels in its own factory, whilst an additional 86 were built by the London, Midland and Scottish Railway's Derby Carriage Works.

The Beaver-Eel consisted of an open topped armoured body mounted a Leyland Retriever 3-ton 6×4 lorry chassis. A solid frame was welded all around the chassis, over which were bolted on a series of armor plates, sometimes with armoured skirts to protect the wheels. The cabin had sloped plating on all three sides, but had an access door at its rear. The front had two armoured shutters, with sight slits, and two swinging covers for the side slits, which provided poor visibility. A ladder was installed on either side to climb into the truck, which was stored inside.

Propulsion was a 4-cylinder liquid cooled petrol engine with a capacity of 360 cu in (5,900 cm^{3}) for an output of 73 hp (54 kW) at 2120 rpm. The crew comprised the driver and co-driver (or unit commander) seated in front, and a gun crew of 3 to 4 persons, depending on the weapons used.

The vehicle was armed with whatever was available, but the most common was a 20 mm (0.8 in) Hispano-Suiza HS.404 autocannon or a 37 mm (1.5 in) Coventry Ordnance Works autocannon on a shielded mount in the rear flatbed, and two additional pintle-mounted .303 Lewis machine guns.

The Beaver-Eel was used throughout the war by the Royal Air Force on the British mainland for aerodrome and aircraft factory defence.

== See also ==
- Bison Mobile Pillbox
- British armoured fighting vehicle production during World War II
