= 35th (South Midlands) Signal Regiment =

British Territorial Army regiment

- Badge of the Royal Corps of Signals
- Active: 1967 - 2009
- Country: United Kingdom
- Branch: Territorial Army
- Type: Royal Corps of Signals
- Role: Support regular army (ARRC) support
- Size: Five Squadrons
- Part of: 12 Signal Group; 143 (West Midlands) Brigade
- Garrison/HQ: Support Squadron - Coventry and Sutton Coldfield; 48 Signal Squadron - Birmingham; 58 Signal Squadron - Newcastle-under-Lyme; 89 Signal Squadron - Rugby; 95 Signal Squadron - Shrewsbury
- Mottos: Certa Cito (“Swift and Sure”)
- Colors: Sky Blue, Navy and Green (Air, Sea and Land)
- March: Quick - Begone Dull Care; Slow - HRH (Princess Royal)
- Mascot: Mercury (“Jimmy”)

Commanders
- R. Signals Colonel in Chief: The Princess Royal
- Honorary Colonel: Vacant
- Commanding Officer: Lt Col A Clewlow MBE R Signals
- Regimental Sergeant Major: WO1 (RSM) L Balmforth

Insignia
- Tactical Recognition Flash

The 35th (South Midlands) Signal Regiment was a British Territorial Army regiment of the Royal Corps of Signals.

== History ==
The Regiment was formed at Sparkbrook in 1967. However, the Headquarters was soon relocated to Sutton Coldfield. The regiment's four squadrons were all based in the Midlands of England:

- HQ Squadron - Sutton Coldfield
- 48 (South Midlands) Signal Squadron - Sparkbrook, Birmingham
- 58 (Staffordshire) Signal Squadron - Newcastle-under-Lyme
- 89 (Warwickshire) Signal Squadron - Rugby

The Regiment was supported by a Royal Electrical and Mechanical Engineers (REME) Light Aid Detachment (LAD). The LAD is responsible for maintaining and repairing the unit's vehicles and equipment, including its fleet of Land Rovers and the L85A2 rifle. In 1969, the Regiment gained an extra squadron:

- 95 (Shropshire Yeomanry) Signal Squadron - Shrewsbury

In 1986, 48 Squadron's subtitle was amended to "City of Birmingham". On 1 July 1999, RHQ and HQ Squadron were relocated to Coventry.

On 28 April 2009, as a result of the strategic review of reserves, it was announced that the regiment was to be disbanded.
