= Leyland Hippo =

Cargo truck

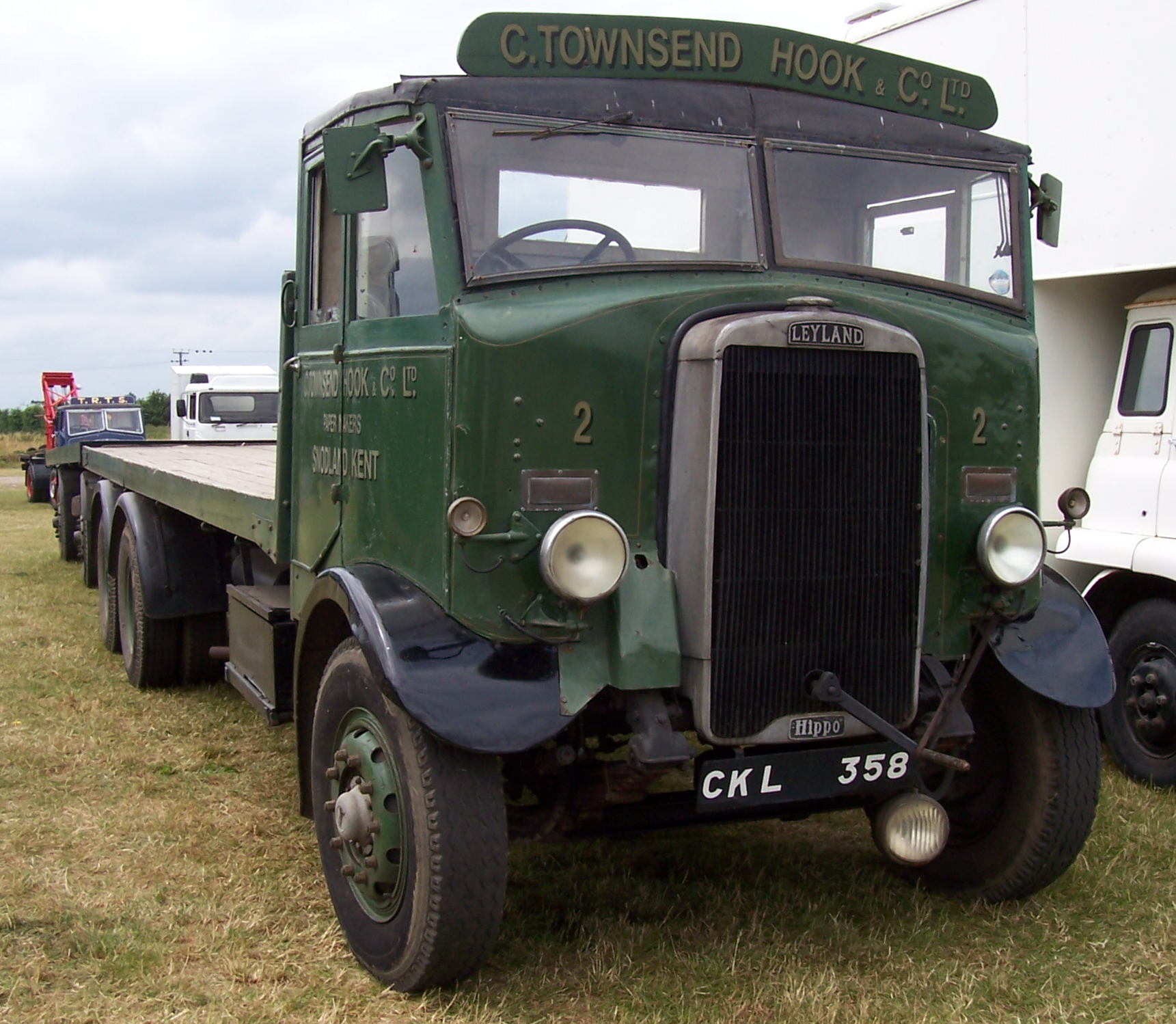
- 1935 Leyland Hippo

Overview
- Manufacturer: Leyland Motors
- Model years: 1929 - circa 1969

Body and chassis
- Layout: 6x4

Powertrain
- Engine: Six-cylinder inline Leyland L6 diesel
- Transmission: four speed

Dimensions
- Length: 27 ft 3 in (8.31 m) - as introduced

The Leyland Hippo was a 6x4 heavy general service cargo truck manufactured by Leyland Motors. Introduced in 1929, it remained in production for 40 years.

== First generation ==
The new six wheeled 12 ton capacity goods carrier truck was first demonstrated at the Commercial Motor Transport Exhibition held at the Olympia Exhibition Centre in 1929. Introduced as a rigid chassis 6x4 truck, the Hippo had the largest engine produced by Leyland at the time, which was an inline six with power output of 72 brake horsepower (54 kW) giving a 30 mph (48 km/h) top speed supported by a four speed gearbox.

As a cab over engine the total length of the unit was 27 ft 3.75 in (8.32 m) with a wheelbase of 17 ft (5.18 m) available in tipper and platform models with 19 ft (5.8 m) loading and 22 ft (6.7 m) loading space respectively, having a dry weight of 5 tons. In the 1931 facelift, the total length of the vehicles was changed to 30ft 30 ft (9.1 m) in total with total capacity of 19 tons. In 1934 a new 8 wheeled vehicles was developed on the platform of the Hippo called Octopus with same engine but had higher load capacity of 22 tons.

Throughout 1939 and 1940 the British Armed Forces took delivery of 330 of the Leyland Hippo Mk I, Also known as the WSW17, the Hippo Mk I was a militarised version of the pre-war Leyland Hippo truck with an open military cab and body.

== Second generation ==
During the war, Leyland became involved in tank development and production. This curtailed production of the Hippo for about two years until it was recognised that more 10-ton vehicles were needed than British firms could supply.

The Leyland Hippo Mk II was a new design by Leyland, developed as a result of the planning for D-Day, which concluded that trucks with 10 long tons (10 t) cargo capacity offered considerable logistic advantages over smaller vehicles. Design of the Hippo Mk II commenced in 1943 with production commencing in late 1944.

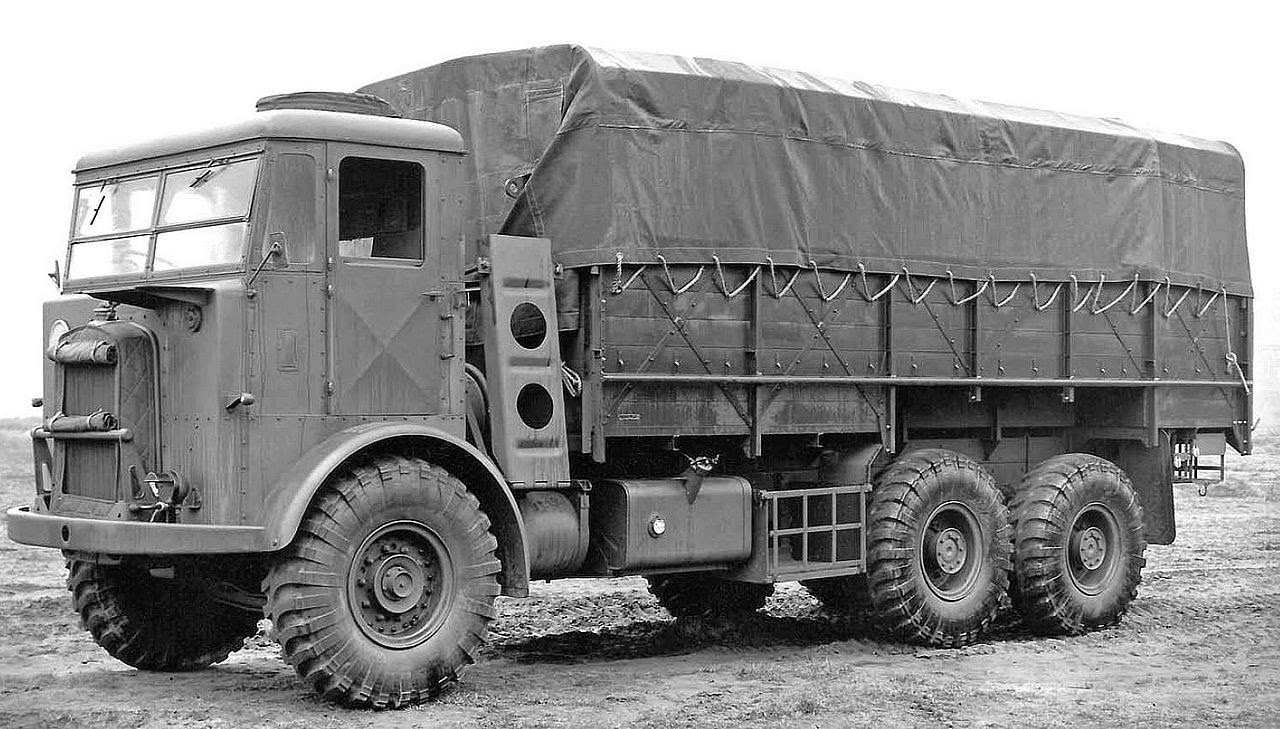
Military Hippo Mk II, 1944

The Leyland Hippo Mk II was a wheeled 6x4 truck, powered by a 100 bhp (75 kW) Leyland six-cylinder inline diesel engine, through a five-speed gearbox and two-speed auxiliary gearbox. The Hippo Mk II had a new two man enclosed steel cab with pull-down windows, the top portion of the cab could be removed to reduce the overall height for shipping. The Mk II was fitted with single tyres at the rear, the Mk IIA was fitted with narrower dual wheels at the rear, this necessitating the need to carry two spare tyres for the front and rear.

The standard general service Hippo Mk II body was a steel framed, timber well type incorporating the wheel arches which reduced the loading height, an important consideration given most of the loading and unloading was done by hand. Steel hoops and a canvas cover gave weather protection and prevented identification of the load by the enemy. Some Hippo Mk IIs were fitted with large van bodies and several with expanding bodies. The sides on the latter were split horizontally, the top half expanding up to give greater roof coverage, the bottom half down to give greater floor space, multiple vehicles could be linked together to form a consolidated workshop area. Post-war bodies included a 2,000 imp gal (9,100 L) refueller.

The Hippo Mk II arrived too late to see service in the days immediately after D-Day, but roughly 1,000 were in service by VE Day and they remained in service with the British Army and the Royal Air Force into the 1950s. In 1945 a civilian version of Mark II was developed. These weighed 19 tons, powered by an inline six cylinder engine with power output of 100 bhp into a five speed gearbox. Civilian versions of the vehicles were to be built with same specifications but with higher load carrying capacity.

== Ashok Leyland Hippo ==
Started as a collaboration of Ashok Motors and British Leyland. In 1954 Ashok Leyland was approved to manufacture Leyland trucks and buses in India, starting with Comet as the first vehicle for the company. In last quarter of 2025 the company was planning to roll out heavy-duty trucks with output of 320 and 360 horsepower in the market to compete with Tata Motors, Bharat Benz and Eicher Motors who already have 300 plus horsepower trucks in Indian market.

In January 2026 Ashok Leyland reintroduced Hippo tractor trucks with six cylinder 8 liter diesel engines producing 320–360 horsepower and 1300-1600 nm of torque coupled with a 9 speed gearbox. The tractor is based on the Bharat stage emission standards compliant AVTR platform of the company, supported by 6x4 combination, bogie suspension and hub reduction for over dimensional cargo operations. In terms of comfort and safety, the tractor features a sleeper cabin, traction control, hill assist, reverse camera, tire pressure monitoring system and advanced driver assistance systems.

== Gallery ==
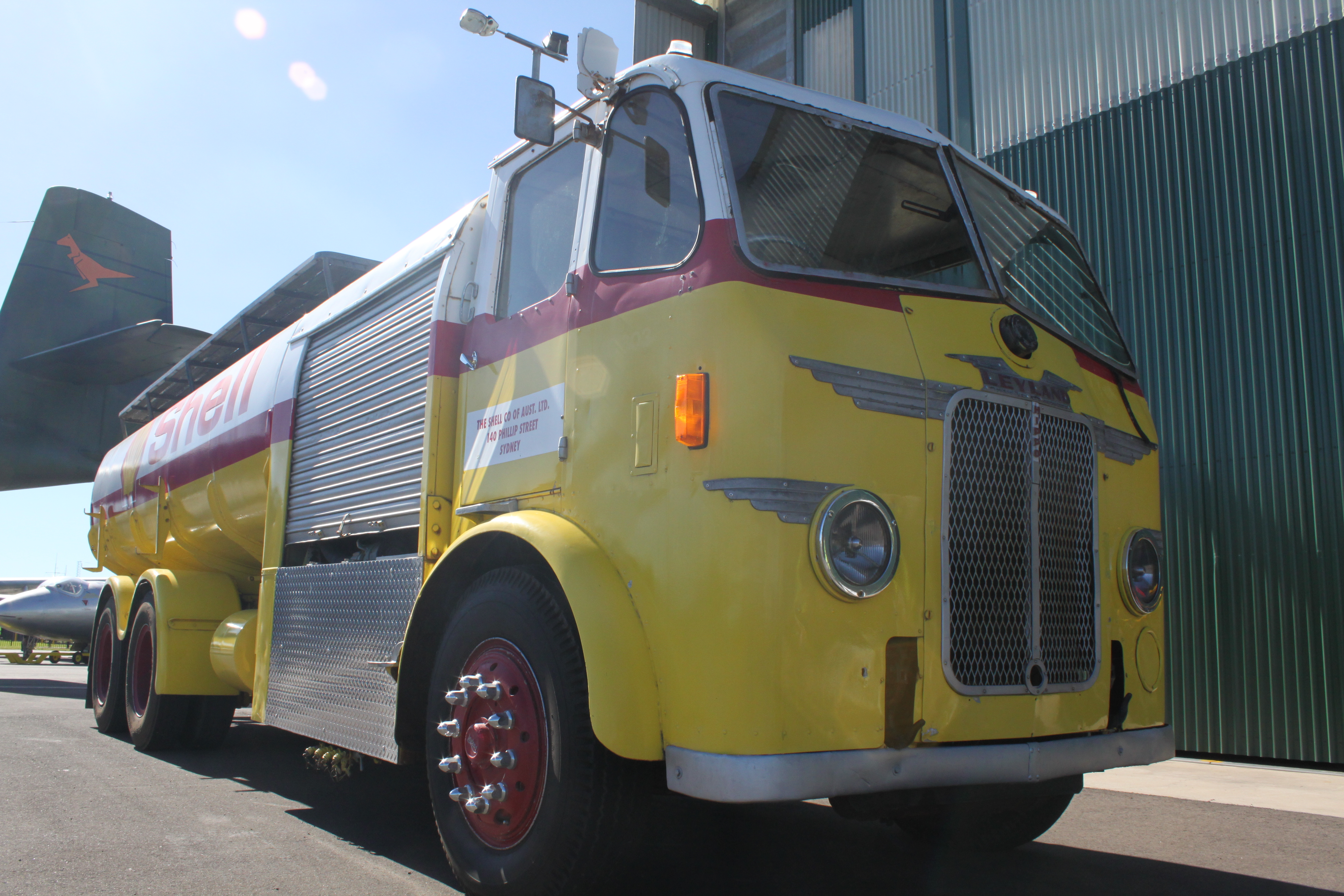
Preserved Shell Australia Leyland Hippo fuel tanker

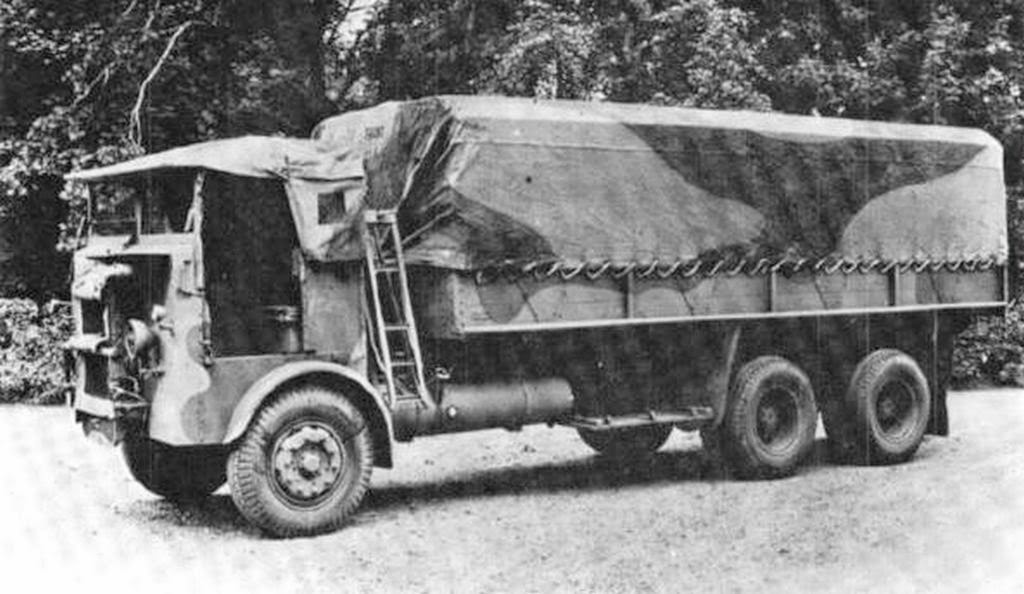
Militarised Leyland Hippo Mk I with open cab, 1939

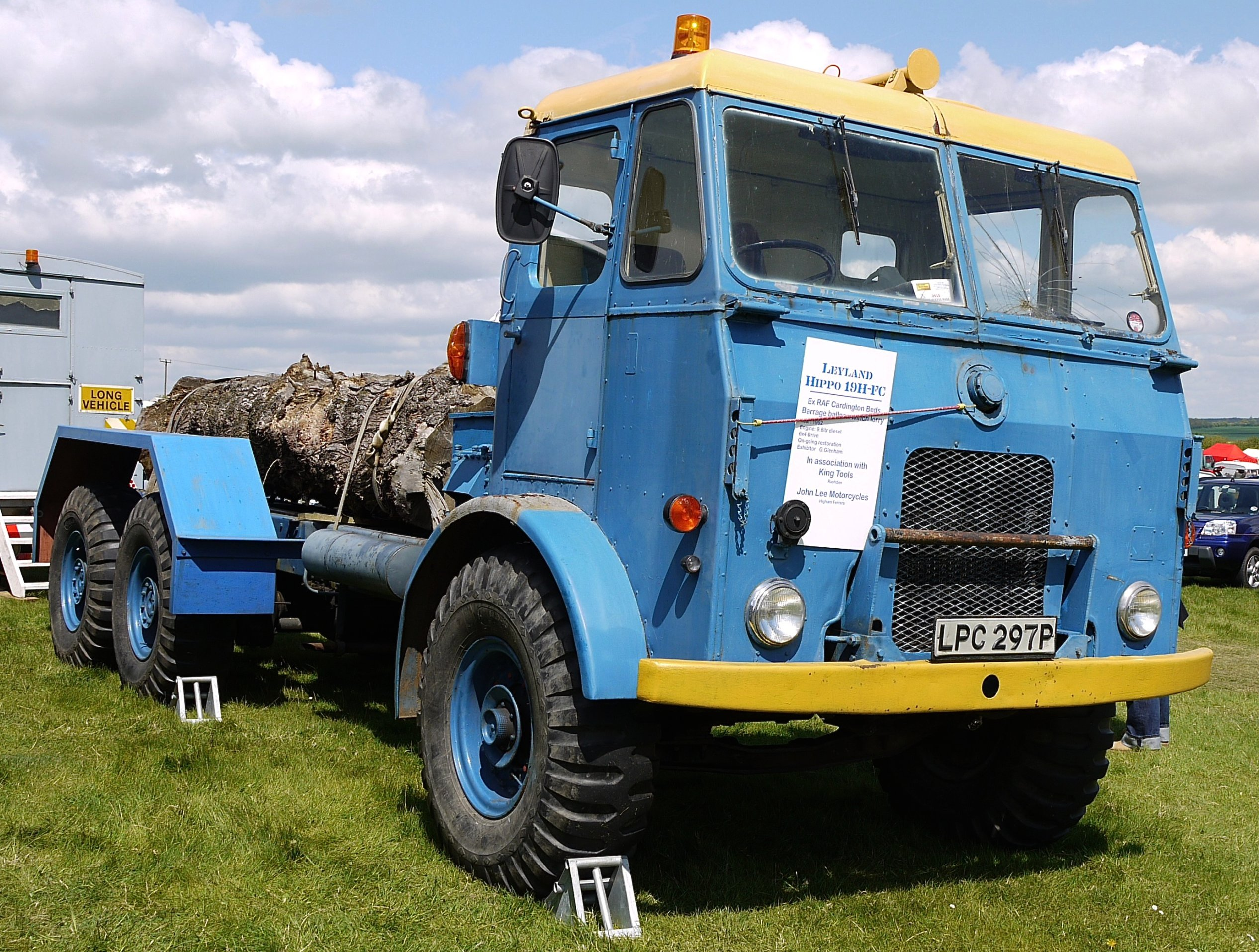
Preserved 1952 Leyland Hippo logging truck

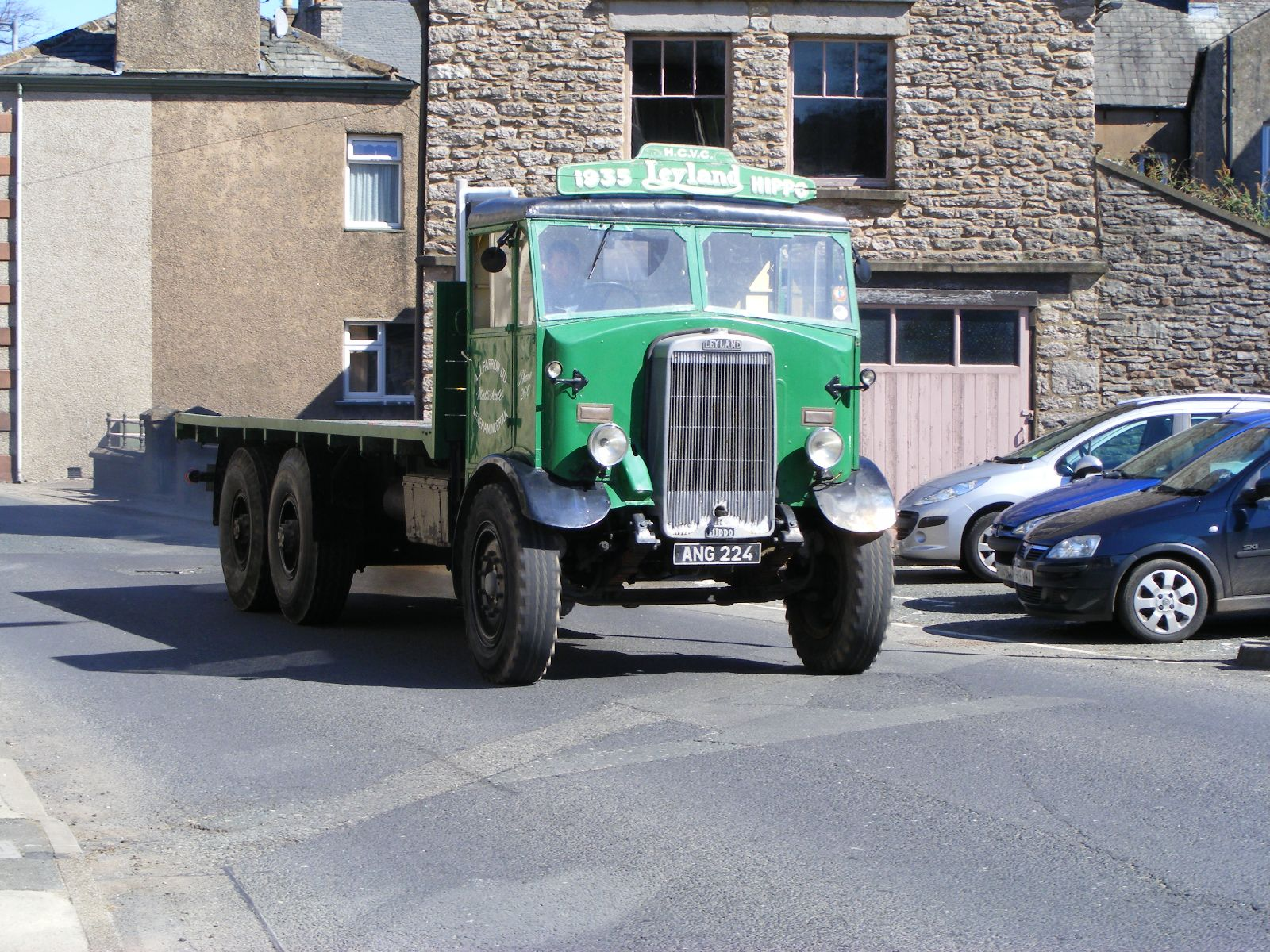
Preserved Leyland Hippo flatbed
