= Leyland Motors =

Lorry and bus manufacturer

Leyland Motors Limited
- Industry: Automotive
- Founded: 1896; 130 years ago (as Lancashire Steam Motor Company) in Leyland, Lancashire
- Defunct: 1968; 58 years ago
- Fate: Merged with British Motor Holdings (Note: The company resulting from the merger of the British Motor Corporation (BMC) and Jaguar Cars in 1966)
- Successor: British Leyland, Ashok Leyland
- Headquarters: Leyland, England
- Products: Buses; Cars; Trucks

Leyland Motors Limited (later known as the Leyland Motor Corporation) was an English vehicle manufacturer of lorries, buses and trolleybuses. The company diversified into car manufacturing with its acquisitions of Triumph and Rover in 1960 and 1967, respectively. It gave its name to the British Leyland Motor Corporation, formed when it merged with British Motor Holdings in 1968, to become British Leyland after having been nationalised. British Leyland later changed its name to simply BL, then in 1986 to Rover Group.

After the various vehicle manufacturing businesses of BL and its successors went defunct or were divested, the following marques survived: Jaguar and Land Rover, now built by Jaguar Land Rover owned by TATA Motors; MG, now built by MG Motor, and Mini, now built by BMW. The truck building operation survived largely intact as Leyland Trucks, a subsidiary of Paccar.

== History ==
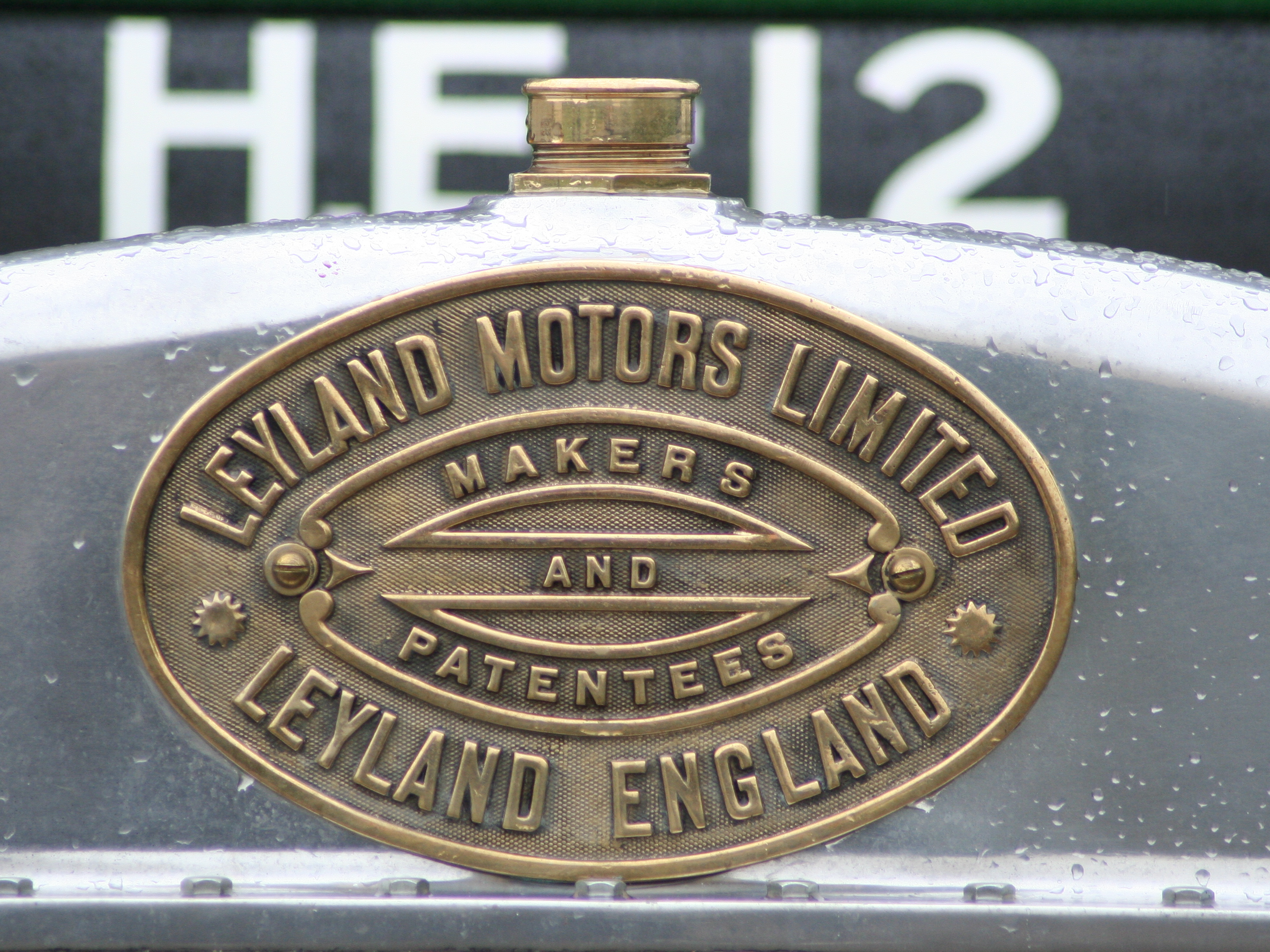
Builder's plate

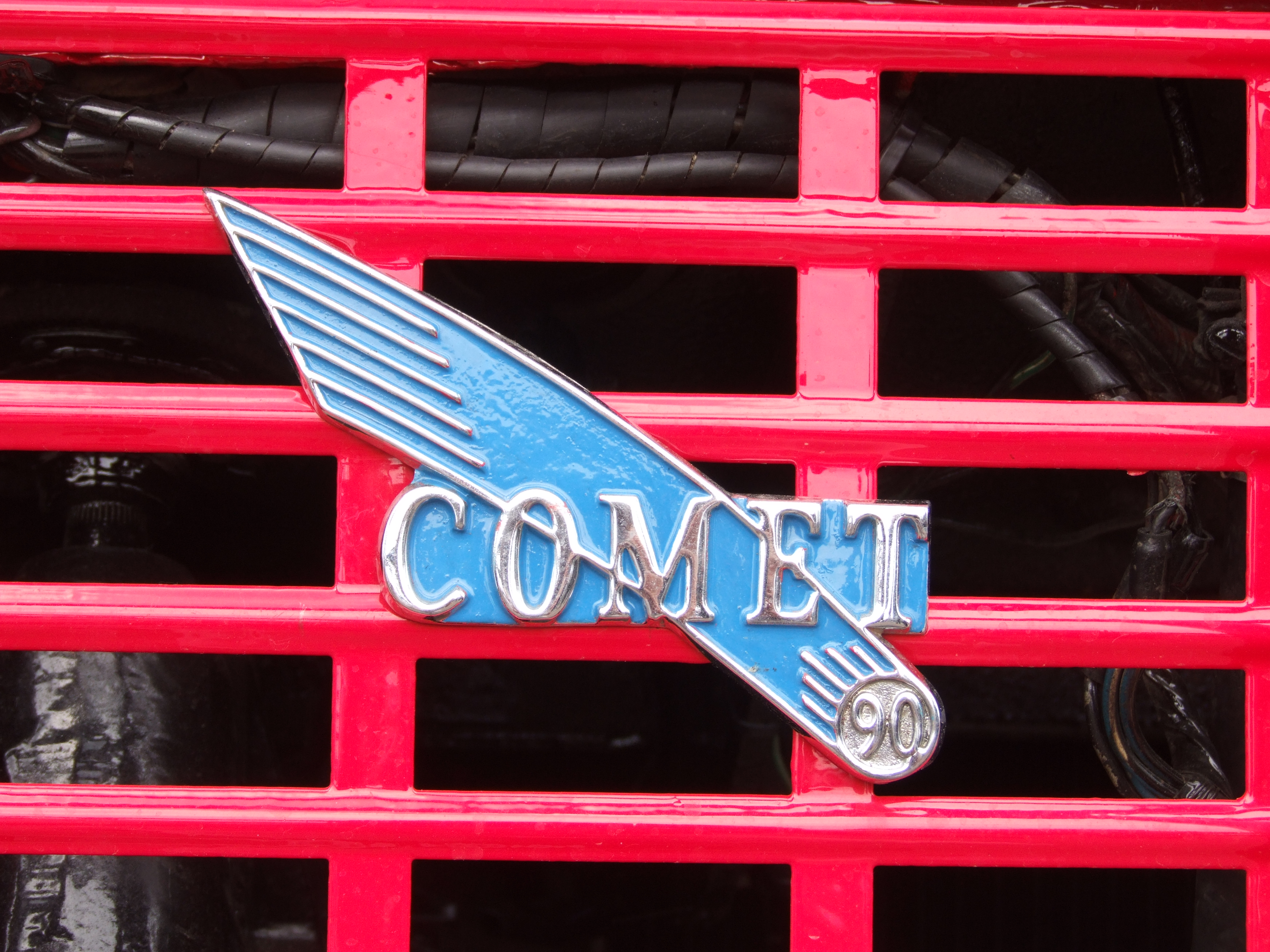
Badge on a 1954 Leyland Comet 90 flatbed lorry

=== Beginning ===
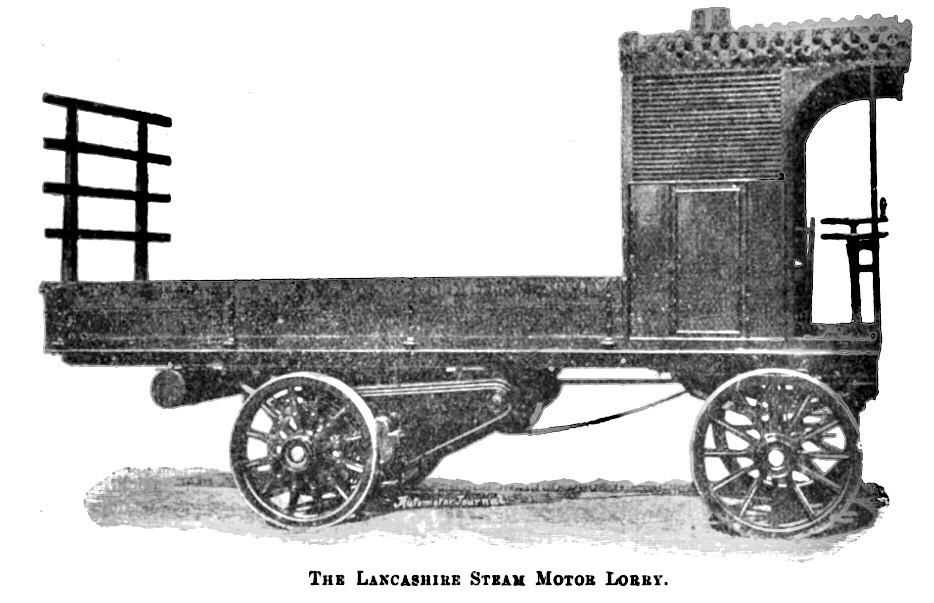
Lancashire Steam Motor Lorry (1898)

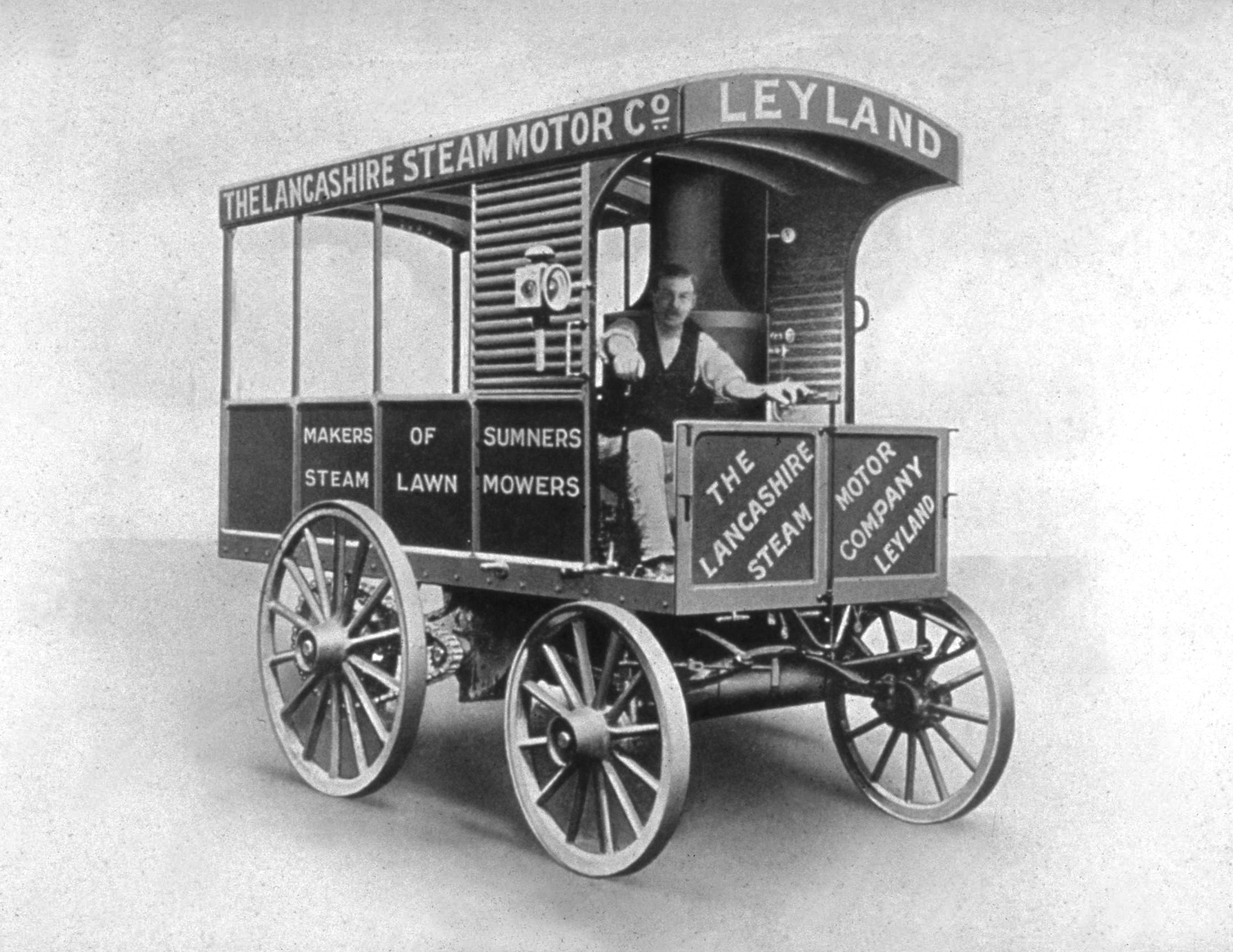
The original Leyland steam van

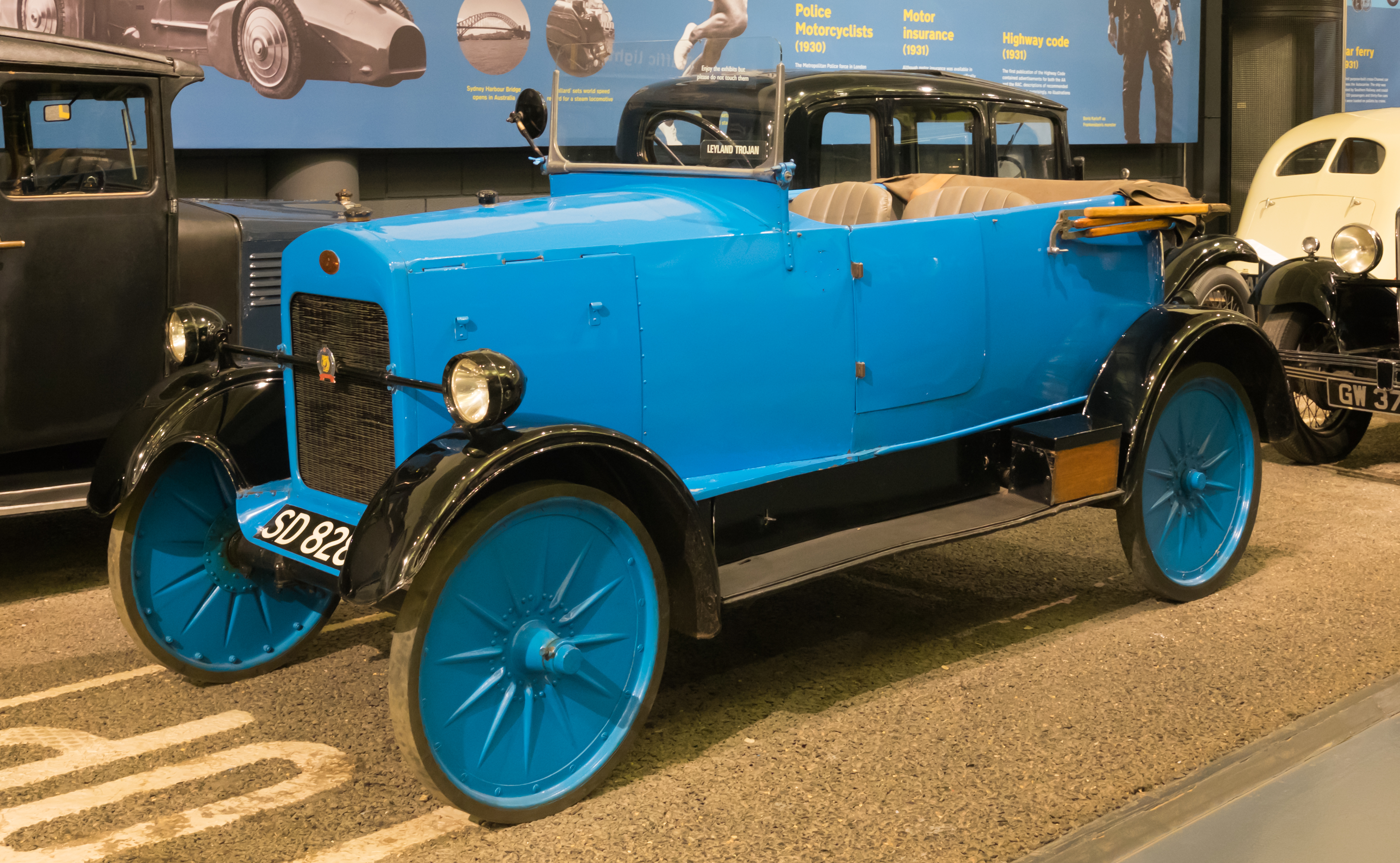
A 1924 Leyland Trojan tourer

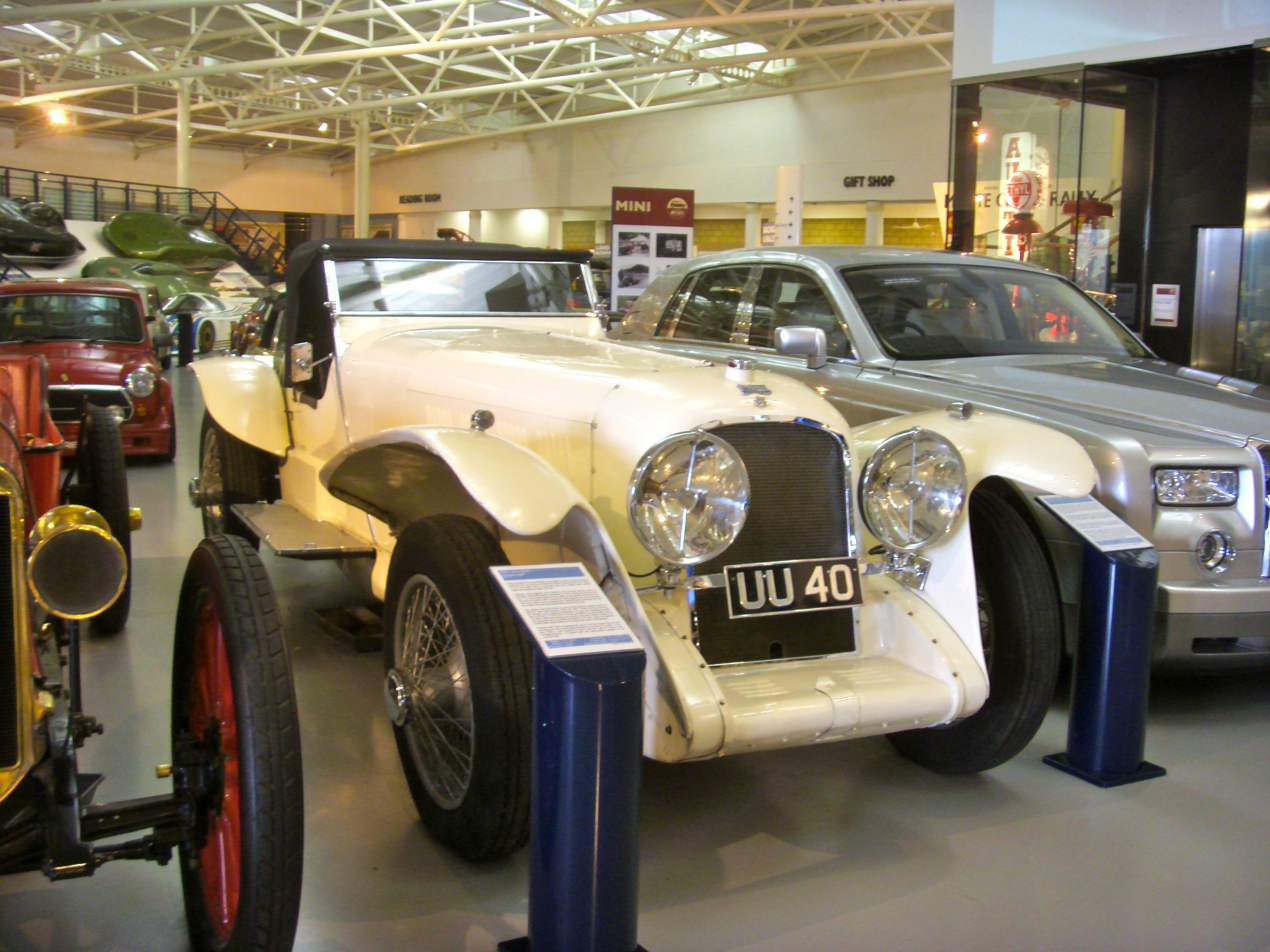
A 1927 Leyland Eight, with sports bodywork

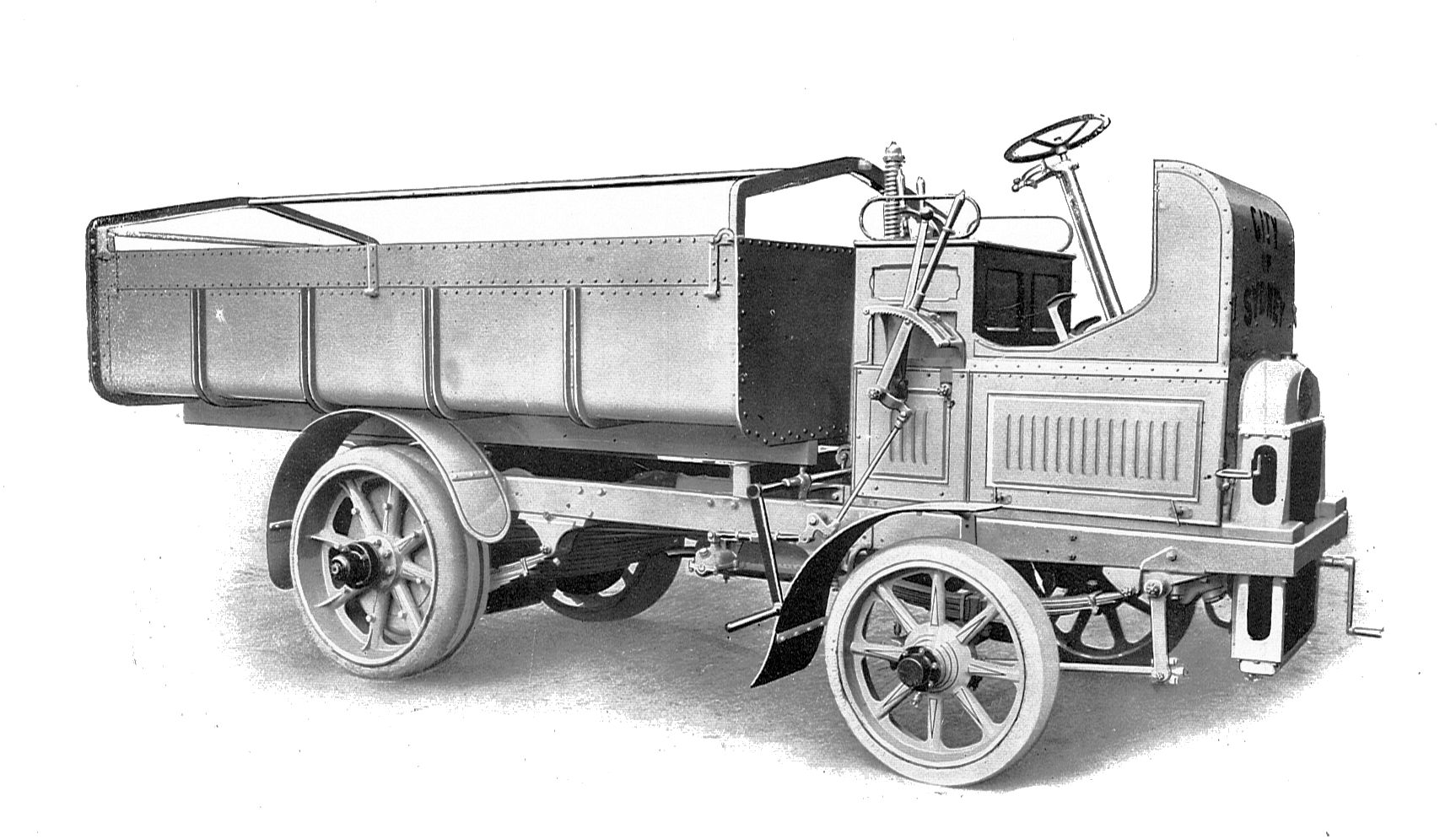
Petrol-engined Leyland wagon

Leyland Motors has a long history dating from 1896, when the Sumner and Spurrier families founded the Lancashire Steam Motor Company in the town of Leyland in North West England. Their first products included steam powered lawn mowers. The company's first vehicle was a 1.5-ton-capacity steam powered van. This was followed by a number of undertype steam wagons using a vertical fire-tube boiler. By 1905 they had also begun to build petrol-engined wagons. The Lancashire Steam Motor Company was renamed Leyland Motors in 1907 when it took over Coulthards of Preston, who had been making steam wagons since 1897. They also built a second factory in the neighbouring town of Chorley situated on Pilling Lane.

In 1920, Leyland Motors produced the Leyland Eight luxury touring car, a development of which was driven by J.G. Parry-Thomas at Brooklands. Parry-Thomas was later killed in an attempt on the land speed record when the Babs car he was driving overturned. Rumours that a chain drive broke were found to be incorrect when the car was disinterred late in the 20th century as the chains were intact. At the other extreme, they also produced the Trojan Utility Car in the Kingston upon Thames factory at Ham from 1922 to 1928.

Three generations of Spurriers controlled Leyland Motors from its foundation until the retirement of Henry Spurrier in 1964. Spurrier inherited control of Leyland Motors from his father in 1942, and successfully guided its growth during the postwar years. Whilst the Spurrier family were in control the company enjoyed excellent labour relations—reputedly never losing a day's production through industrial action.

=== World War II ===
During World War II, Leyland Motors, along with most vehicle manufacturers, was involved in war production. Leyland built the Cromwell tank at its works from 1943 as well as medium/large trucks such as the Hippo and Retriever.

After the war, Leyland Motors continued military manufacture with the Centurion tank.

=== Post war ===
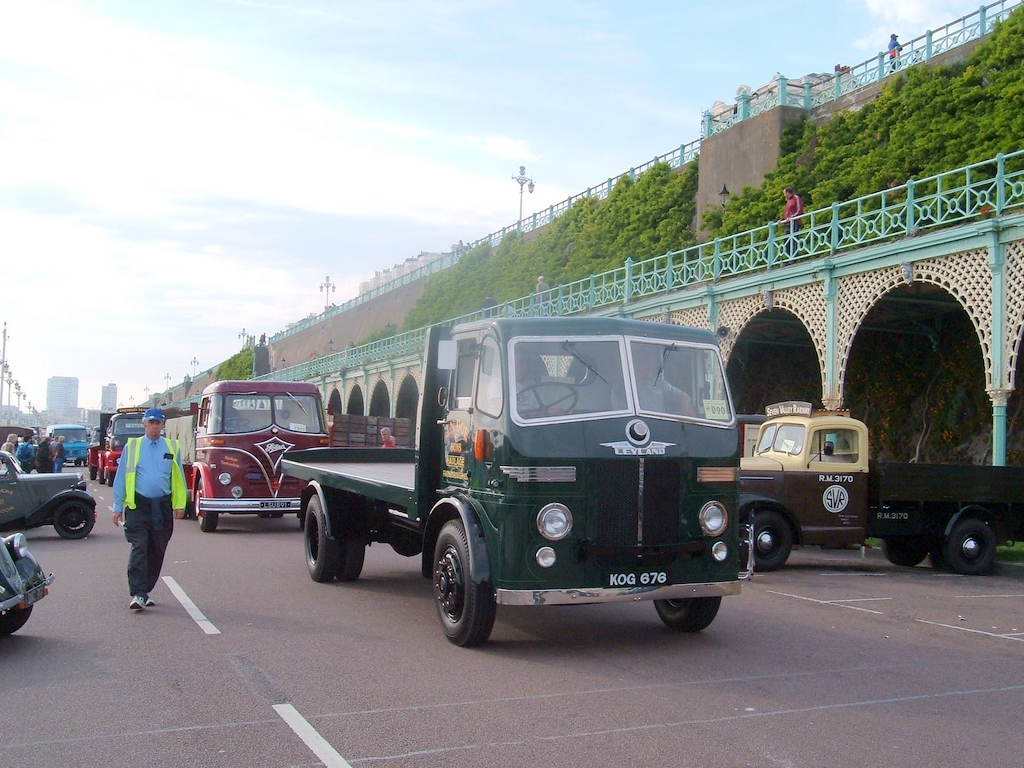
1948 Leyland Beaver flatbed

In 1946, AEC and Leyland Motors formed British United Traction to build trolleybuses.

In 1955, through an equity agreement, manufacture of commercial vehicles under licence from Leyland Motors commenced in Madras, India at the new Ashok factory. The products were branded as Ashok Leyland.

Leyland Motors acquired other companies in the post war years:

- 1951: Albion Motors
- 1953: Collaboration with Danish Automobile Building (DAB), a bus manufacturer, later with a majority stake in the 1970s
- 1955: Scammell, military and specialist lorry manufacturer
- 1956: Farington Tank Company
- 1961: Standard-Triumph, cars, vans and some agricultural machinery interests

=== Holding company: Leyland Motor Corporation ===
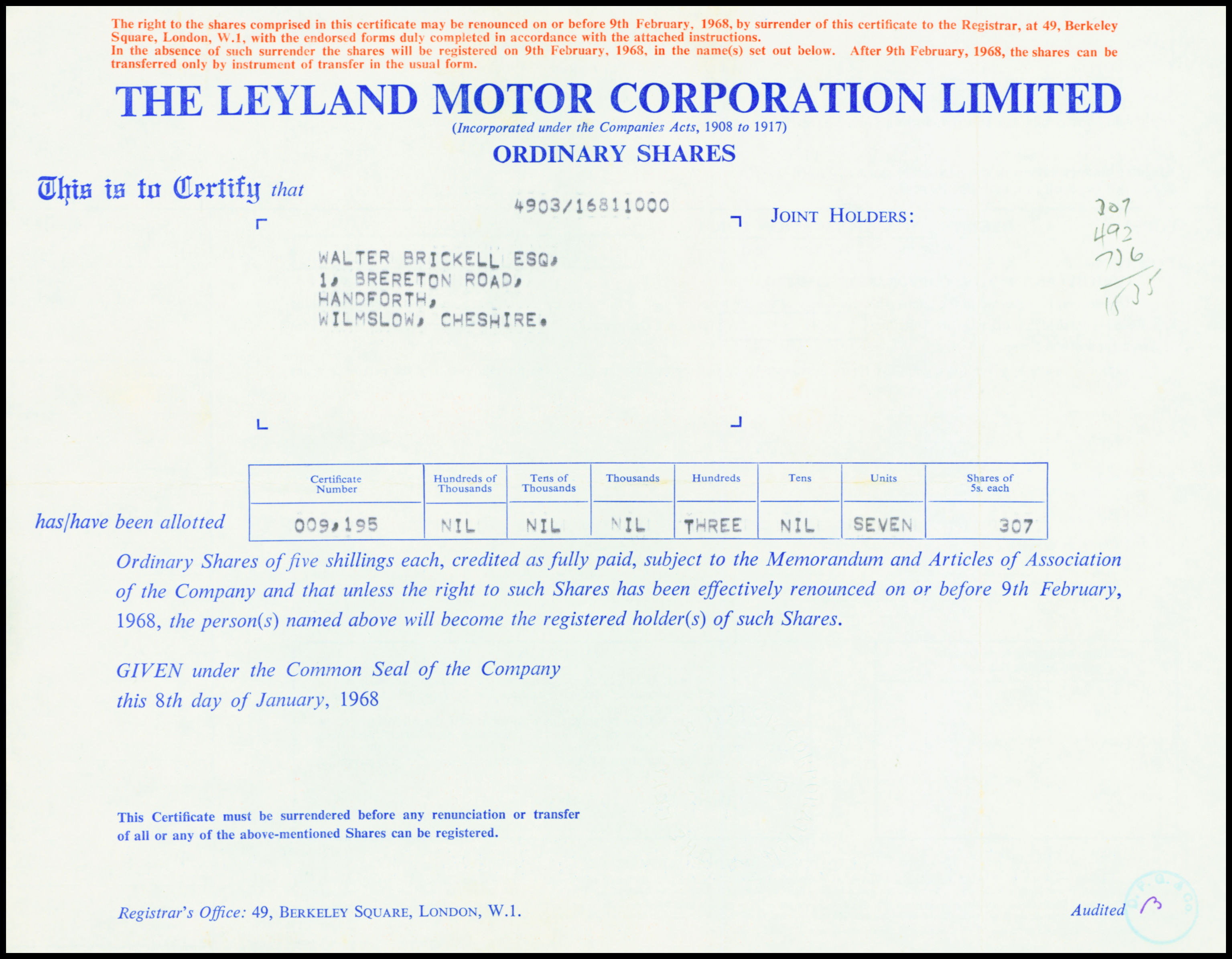
Share of the Leyland Motor Corporation Ltd, issued 8. January 1968

Donald Stokes, previously Sales Director, was appointed managing director of Leyland Motors Limited in September 1962. Originally a Leyland student apprentice he had grown up with the company. He became chairman in 1966. Chronologically, the 1960s growth of Leyland Motor Corporation (LMC) was as follows:

- 1962: Leyland Motors acquires Associated Commercial Vehicles (ACV), which incorporated AEC, Thornycroft, Park Royal Vehicles and Charles H Roe.
- 1962 a new group holding company was incorporated to own Leyland Motors Limited, ACV and new acquisitions
- 1965: Minority (25%) interests in Bristol Commercial Vehicles and Eastern Coach Works
- 1966: Acquisition of The Rover Company and their subsidiary car, aero-engine and armoured fighting vehicle manufacturer Alvis Car and Engineering Company
- 1967: Aveling-Barford was acquired This company mainly made road rollers and dumper trucks.

In 1968 Leyland Motors merged with British Motor Holdings (BMH) to form the British Leyland Motor Corporation (BLMC). BMH, which was the product of an earlier merger between the British Motor Corporation, the Pressed Steel Company and Jaguar, brought with it more marques, including Daimler, Guy, BMC, Austin, MG and Morris. Leyland diesel engines were used in Finnish Sisu and Vanaja lorries and buses in 1960s.

=== British Leyland era ===
The BLMC group was difficult to manage because of the many companies under its control, often making similar products. This, and other reasons, led to financial difficulties and in December 1974 British Leyland had to receive a guarantee from the British government.

In 1975, after the publication of the Ryder Report and the company's bankruptcy, BLMC was nationalised as British Leyland (BL) and split into four divisions with the bus and truck production becoming the Leyland Truck & Bus division within the Land Rover Leyland Group. This division was split into Leyland Bus and Leyland Trucks in 1981. Leyland Trucks depended on British sales as well as export markets, mainly Commonwealth and ex-Commonwealth markets. The early 1980s were very hard, with export sales drying up in many places such as oil-dependent Nigeria. In 1986, BL changed its name to Rover Group, derived from the Rover brand Leyland had bought in the 1960s, and which would eventually gain prominence as BL gradually retired most of its marques. The equity stake in Ashok Leyland was controlled by Land Rover Leyland International Holdings, and sold in 1987. At this point, while building about 10,000 trucks per annum, Leyland was more and more dependent on outside engines as production of their own 98-series was steadily declining. The 1986 closure of Bedford Vehicles' heavy truck plant further harmed Leyland, as they had been planning on selling axles and other components to the General Motors subsidiary.

=== Leyland name post-British Leyland ===
==== Buses ====
The bus operations was sold in a management buyout to form Leyland Bus, and was subsequently bought by Volvo in 1988, which then discontinued most of its product range but kept the Olympian. Volvo reengineered and renamed it as the first named Volvo Bus model, the Volvo Olympian, and aside from minor frame changes the major alterations were the fitment of Volvo axles, braking system, and controls. Both were the best selling double-deck bus chassis of their time.

==== Trucks ====
- 1987 The Leyland Trucks division of Rover Group (formerly BL) (which included the Freight Rover division) merged with DAF Trucks of The Netherlands to form DAF NV (which in the UK traded as Leyland DAF and elsewhere as DAF), and was floated on the Dutch stock exchange. The new company had three plants; two truck plants in Eindhoven and Leyland, and a van plant in Washwood Heath.
- 1993 DAF NV went into bankruptcy. All three plants were bought through a management buy-out, the truck plant in Eindhoven resumed trading as DAF Trucks, the truck plant in Leyland resumed trading as Leyland Trucks and the van plant in Washwood Heath became LDV which continued trading until 2009. The spare parts operation, Multipart, was subject to a management buy-out, eventually becoming part of the LEX organisation.
- 1996/1998 Both DAF Trucks & Leyland Trucks were acquired by the US truck manufacturer Paccar. Leyland Trucks now operates as a division of Paccar from the Leyland Assembly Plant in North West England manufacturing around 14,000 trucks per year of which about a third are sold in the EU, though marketed under the DAF name and not with the name Leyland.

=== Ashok Leyland ===
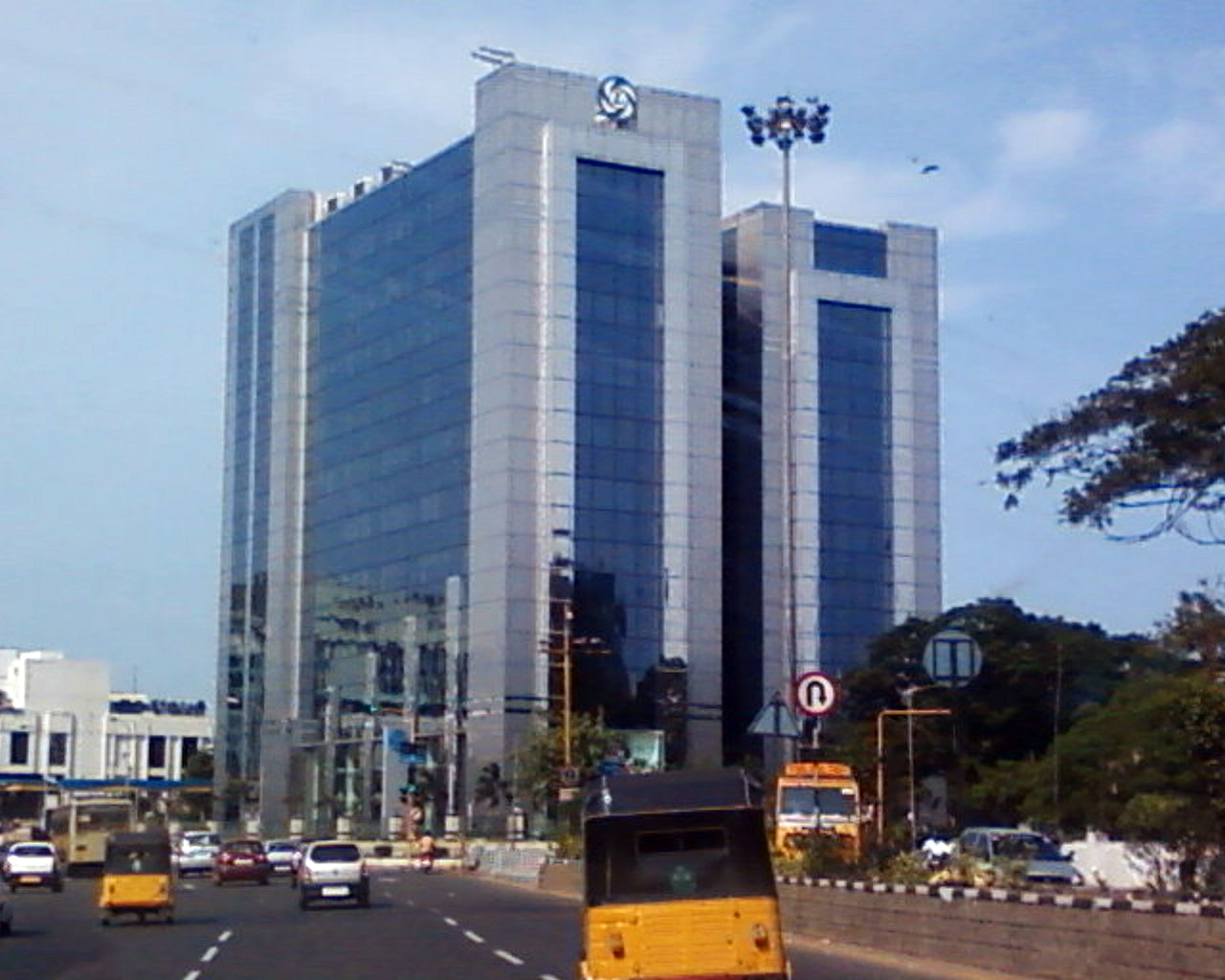
Ashok Leyland Corporate Building in Chennai, India

The Leyland name and logo continues as a recognised and respected marque across India, the wider subcontinent and parts of Africa in the form of Ashok Leyland. Part of the giant Hinduja Group, Ashok Leyland manufactures buses, trucks, defence vehicles and engines. The company is a leader in the heavy transportation sector within India and has an aggressive expansionary policy. In 1987 the London based Hinduja Group bought the Indian-based Ashok Leyland company. Today, Ashok-Leyland is pursuing a joint venture with Nissan, and through its acquisition of the Czech truck maker, Avia, is entering the European truck market directly. With its purchase of a 26% stake in UK-based bus manufacturer Optare in 2010, Ashok Leyland has taken a step closer to reconnecting with its British heritage, as Optare is a direct descendant of Leyland's UK bus-making division. On 21 December 2011, Ashok Leyland bought an additional 49% stake in Optare, bringing its total to 75%.

== Products ==
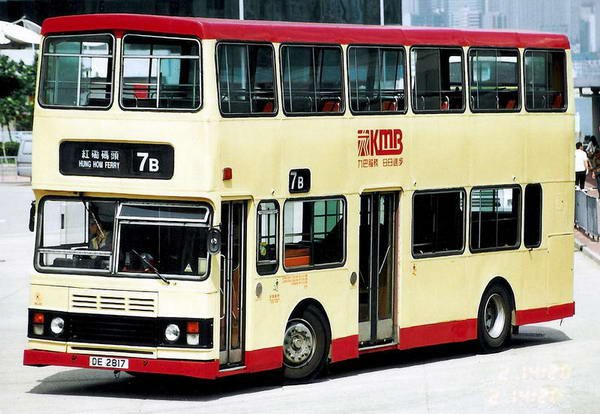
A Kowloon Motor Bus 2-axle Leyland Olympian in Hong Kong

=== Buses ===
Historically, Leyland Motors was a major manufacturer of buses used in the United Kingdom and worldwide. It achieved a number of firsts or milestones that set trends for the bus industry. It was one of the first manufacturers to devise chassis designs for buses that were different from trucks, with a lower chassis level to help passengers board more easily. Its chief designer, George John Rackham, who had experience at the Yellow Coach Company in Chicago before returning to England, created the Titan and Tiger ranges in 1927 that revolutionised bus design. After 1945, Leyland created another milestone with the trend-setting Atlantean rear-engined double-decker bus design produced between 1956 and 1986.

See List of Leyland buses for the list of bus products.

=== Trucks ===
==== 1900–1910 ====
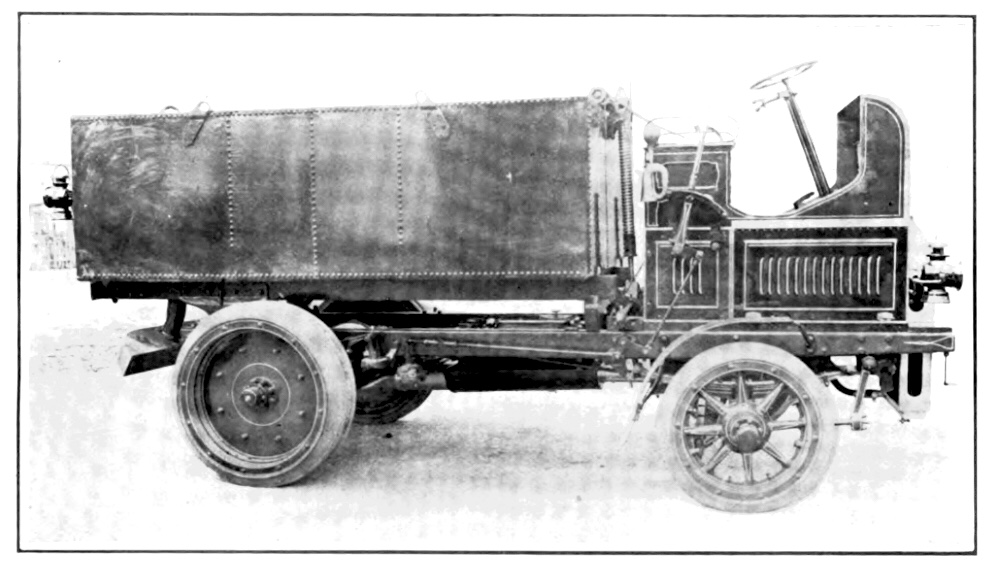
Leyland X2 (1909) 35 hp

- Class H (Steam)
- Class F (Steam)
- Class K (Steam)
- Class W Petrol
- Class Xa
- Class Xs
- Class TX
- Class T

==== 1910s ====
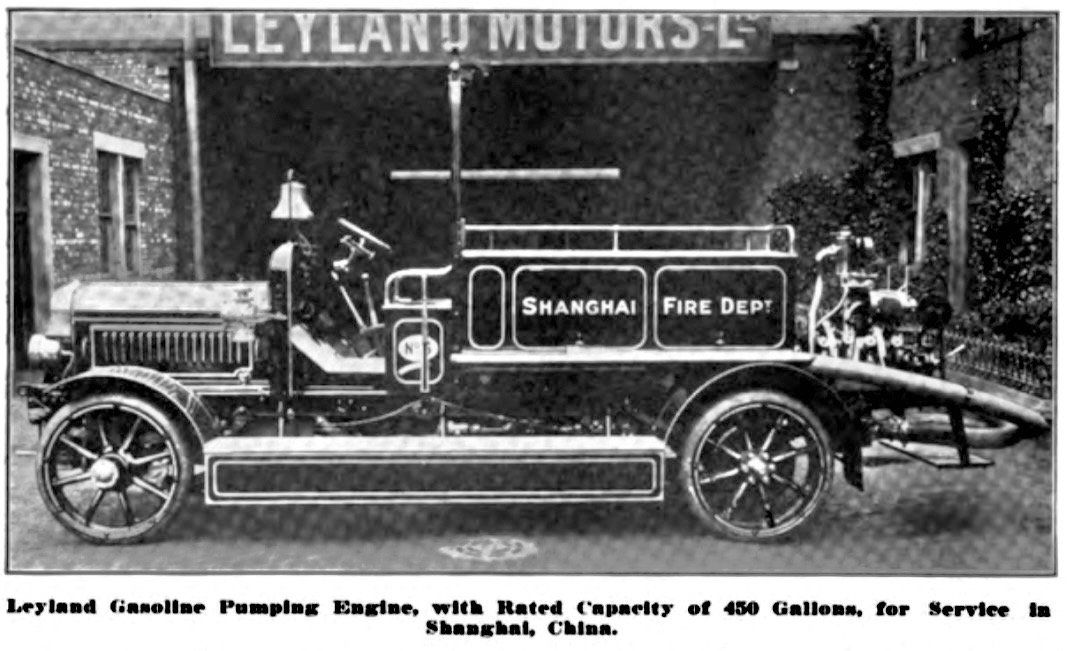
Leyland Fire Engine (1913) 8366 cc

- 1t
- A 2t (1919- )
- C 3t (1919– )
- G2 4t (1919– )
- 5t
- 6t

==== 1920s ====
- P2 5 Ton
- Q-type 4 ton
- Q2 6 ton
- SQ2 7 ton
- SWQ2 10-ton six-wheeler
- Bull
- Carrimore 4X2
- Roadwagon

==== 1930s ====
- Beaver
- Bison
- Buffalo
- Bull
- Llama
- Hippo - 12 ton capacity, 6x4, produced 1929 - circa 1969
- Octopus 22-ton eight-wheeler, developed from Hippo in 1934
- Steer
- Lynx
- Cub
- Badger
- Overseas Roadtrain

==== 1940s ====
- Comet
- Hippo
- Hippo Mk II - military version, produced from 1944
- Retriever
- Beaver

==== 1950s ====
- Martian

==== 1960s ====
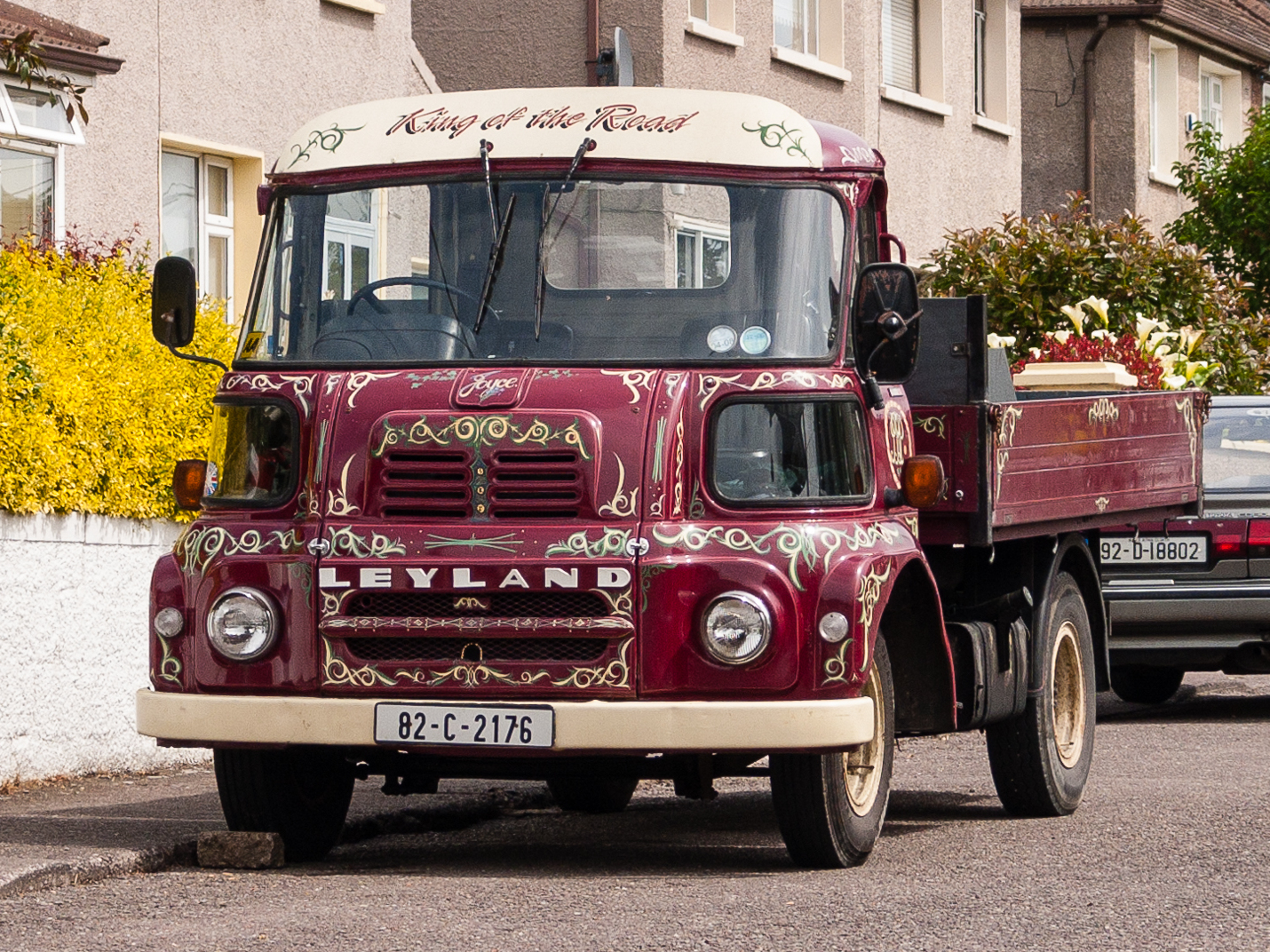
Leyland FG

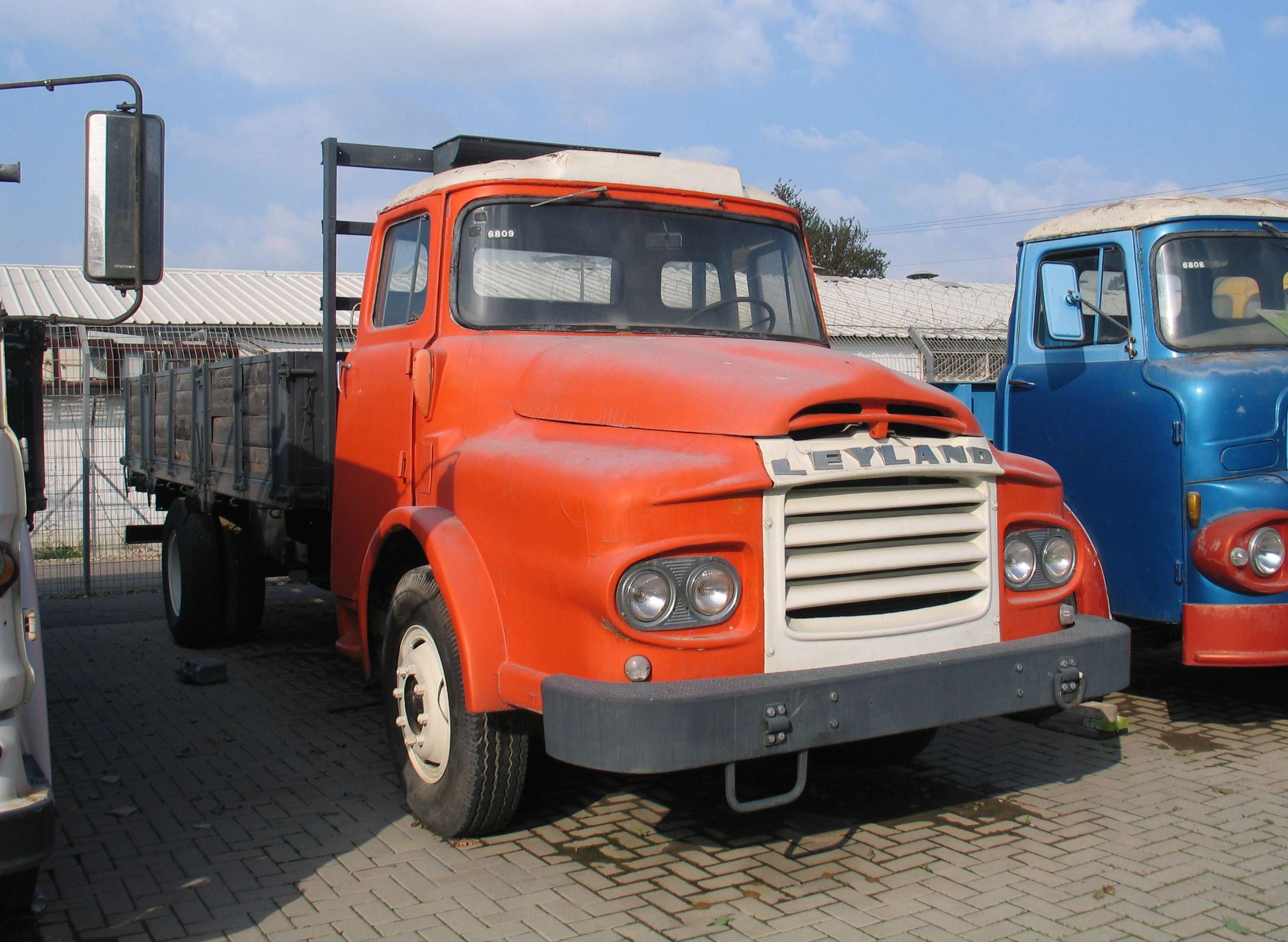
Leyland Super Chieftain

- Leyland 90
- Comet
- Laird
- Steer (1966, Ergomatic)
- Gas Turbine
- FG
- Lynx
- Leyland Super Chieftain

==== 1970s ====
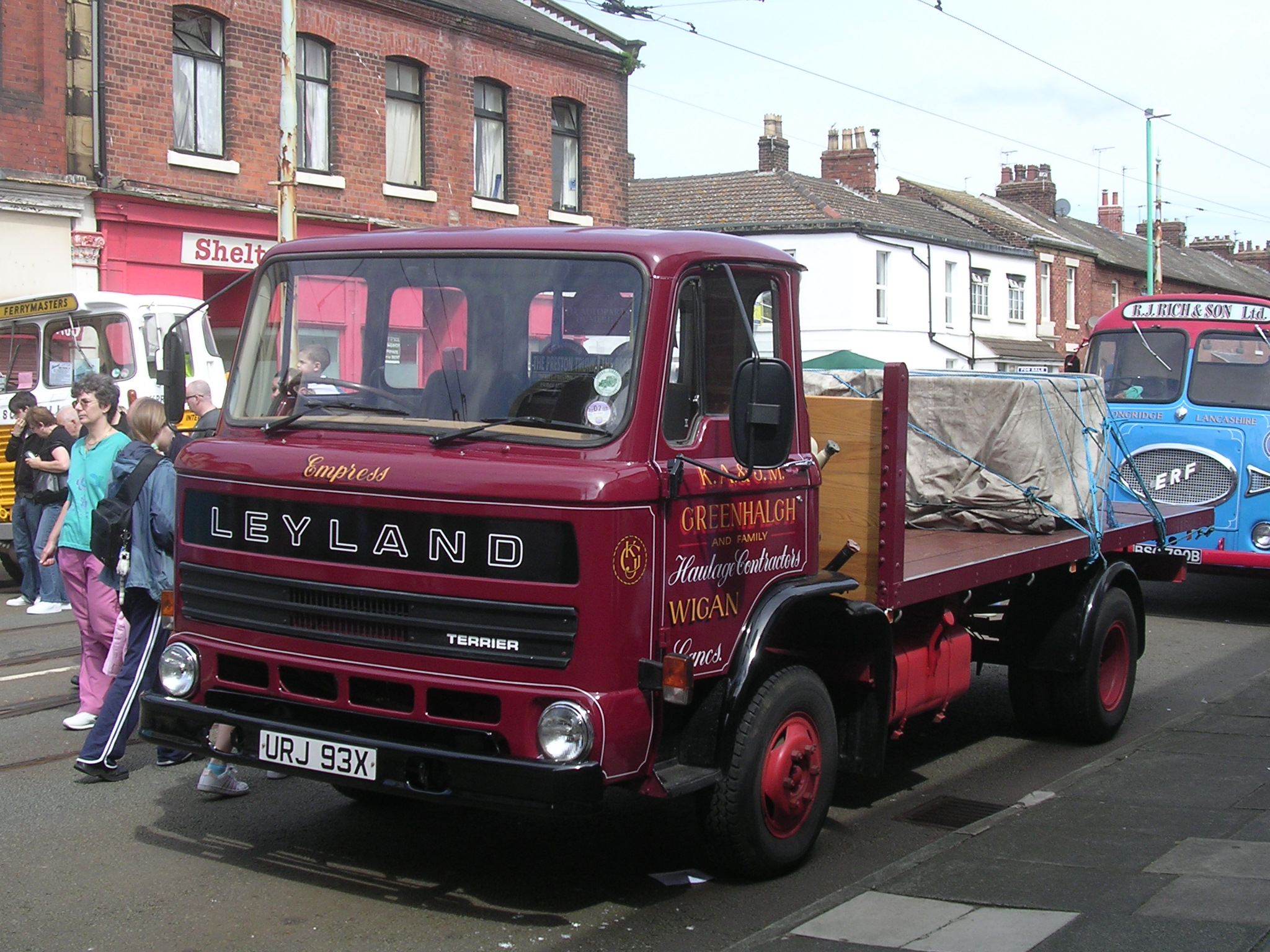
Leyland Terrier

- Cruiser
- Harrier
- Terrier (G-series)
- Firemaster
- Boxer (G-series)
- Landmaster
- Clydesdale (G-series)
- Chieftain
- Mastiff (G-series)
- Reiver (G-series)
- Marathon (Ergomatic)
- Bison (Ergomatic)
- Buffalo (Ergomatic)

The G-series cab was built in Bathgate and was available with several different names, such as Terrier, Clydesdale, and Reiver. After this cab was replaced the tooling was shipped to Turkey, where BMC's Turkish subsidiary built it as the "BMC Yavuz" and then as the "Fatih" (with Cummins engines) from 1986 until 1996.

The Marathon was Leyland's answer to the booming "max cap" truck fad at the start of the 1970s. Imports such as the Volvo F88 and Scania 110/140 were selling very well in the UK thanks to the previously unheard of levels of driver comfort, reliability, quality and performance.

Leyland had insufficient money for development of a complete new vehicle at the time, so designers were instructed to utilise as many existing in-house components as possible. It was perceived at the time that the resulting model would be a stopgap until the new T45 range was ready for production toward the latter half of the 1970s.

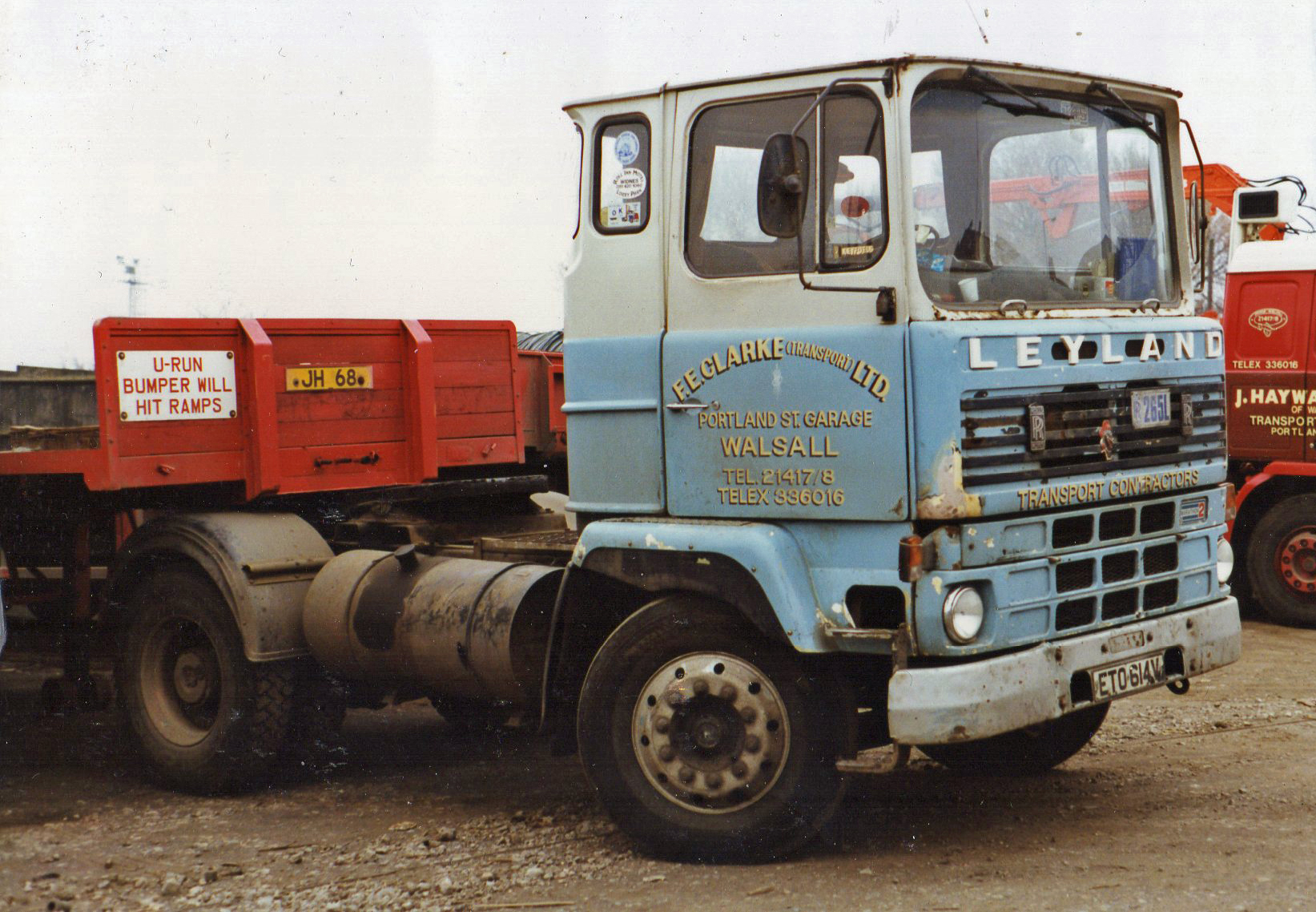
A 1979 model of the short-lived redesigned Marathon 2

The cab was a re-worked version of the "Ergomatic" tilt cab of 1965, heavily modified with different lower panels, raised height etc., and was available in day and sleeper cab form. Engines were decided from the outset to be in the higher power category to be competitive with rival vehicles. The only existing engine within the Leyland empire suitable for such an application (following the demise of the ill-fated fixed-head 500 series and AEC's underdeveloped and unreliable V8) was the AEC AV760 straight-six, which was turbocharged and designated as the TL12. Other engine options included a 200 bhp Leyland L11, as well as Cummins 10- and 14-litre engines at 250 and 330 bhp, respectively.

Production began in 1973, and various shortcomings were noted, including below-par heating and ventilation, and pronounced cab roll. However, road testers of the time were very impressed by the truck's power and performance. In 1977, the redesigned "Marathon 2" was launched, an updated and revised vehicle that attempted to address some of the previous criticisms of the earlier vehicle. Relatively few Marathons of all types were sold before production ended in 1979 with the introduction of the T45 "roadtrain" range of vehicles.

==== 1980s ====
===== Roadrunner =====
This was Leyland's answer to the Ford Cargo in the non-HGV 7.5-ton truck sector. Launched in 1984, it utilised a Leyland 698 straight-six engine until 1986, when a 5.9 L Cummins was introduced. It was notable at the time for its low-level passenger side windscreen, featured as a safety aid to enable the driver to see the kerb, although this was removed on later models. The basic cab had a long service life, being used later on the Leyland DAF 45.

===== Constructor =====
The Leyland Constructor was a 6x4, three axle wagon with gross weight up to 24 tonnes used as a tipper or on short haul distribution duties.

===== Roadtrain =====
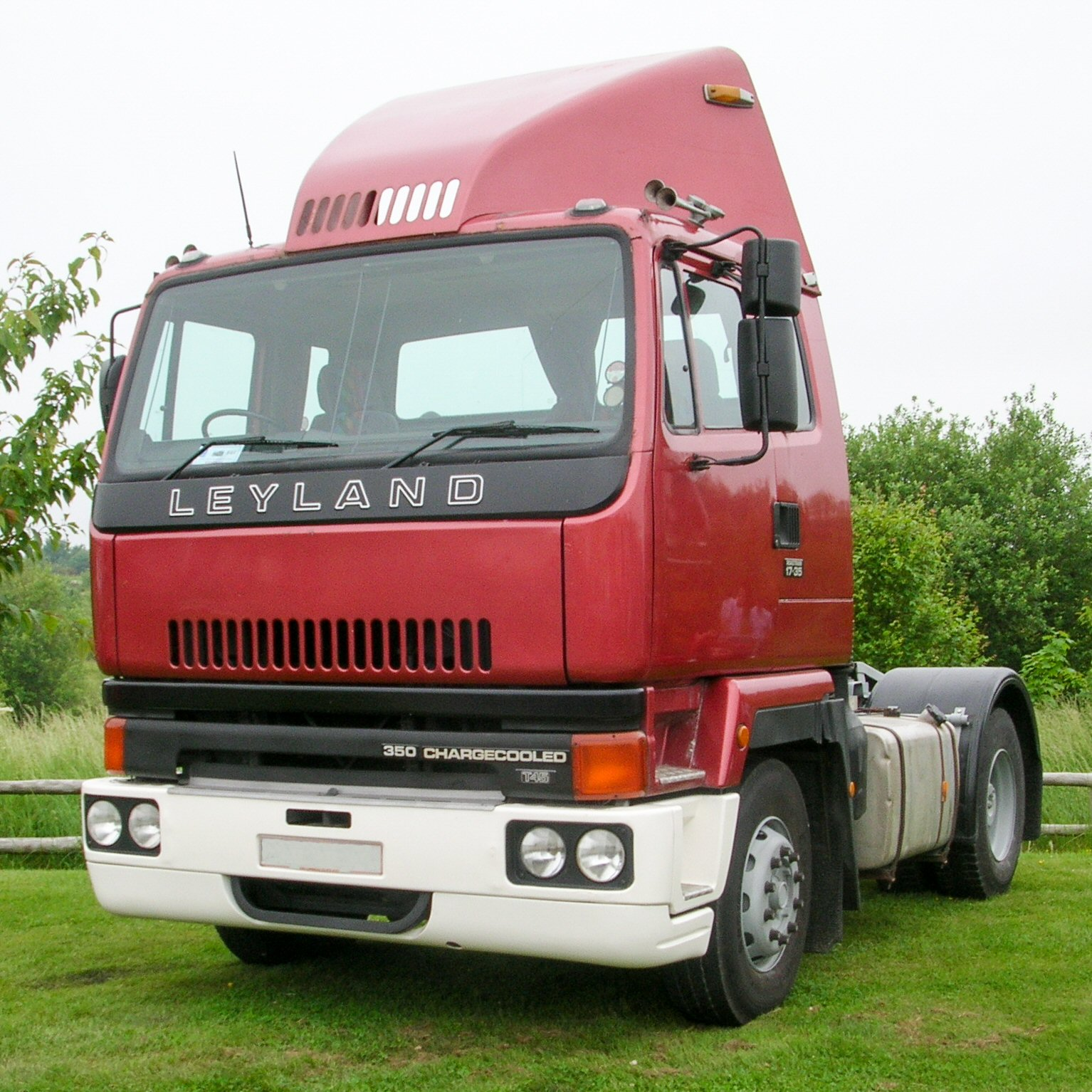
1988 T45 Roadtrain tractor unit

The Leyland Roadtrain was a range of heavy goods vehicle tractor units manufactured by Leyland Trucks between 1980 and 1990. The nomenclature "T45" refers to the truck range as a whole and encompasses models such as the lightweight 7.5-ton Roadrunner, Freighter (fourwheel rigid truck), Constructor (multi-axle rigid tipper or mixer chassis – its chassis owing much to the outgoing Scammell 8-wheeler Routeman), and Cruiser (basic spec low weight tractor unit). The Roadtrain itself was a max weight model with distance work in mind.

The T45's cab is called the C40 and its design was a joint effort between Leyland, BRS and Ogle Design and was seen as the height of modernity when compared with its predecessors, the idea being to have one basic design to replace the various outgoing models (for example, the Bathgate built the G cab on the Terrier, the Ergomatic cabbed the Lynx, Beaver etc.). This did indeed make good economic sense; however, there has been speculation that Leyland did in fact alienate a number of customers who had traditionally purchased other marques from within the Leyland empire—Albion, AEC, Scammell, etcetera – who were now left with no alternative but to have a Leyland-branded vehicle or purchase from elsewhere. Some Constructors, with their Scammell-based chassis, were built with Scammell badging as well.

Throughout its production run, engine choices included the AEC-based TL12, a straight carry over from the preceding "stopgap" model Marathon range, The Rolls-Royce Eagle 265/300 and the Cummins 290 L10 and 14-litre 350 coupled to a Spicer or Eaton transmission, although all versions produced a distinctive whine from the propshaft knuckle joint when approaching 60 mph (97 km/h). The TL12 engine was dropped early on in the production run, with most large fleet buyers choosing the Rolls-Royce engine.

The Roadtrain was available in day- and sleeper-cabbed form, in high and low datum versions—this refers to the cab height—high datum versions were intended as long haul vehicles with higher mounted cabs and more internal space. 6x2 versions were built in high cab form only on a chassis that was basically that of the ageing Scammell trunker. The Constructor's chassis was entirely Routeman behind the cab, albeit with altered suspension and with the front chassis rails splayed wider apart to fit the new C40 cab.

In 1986, the high roofed Roadtrain interstate was introduced, a top of the range long distance truck with standing room inside.

The Roadtrain was a common sight throughout most of the 1980s, with a great many of the major fleet users in the UK such as Tesco, Blue Circle Industries (unusually with high datum day cabs) and BRS running them. The firm of Swain's based in Rochester, Kent had a number of Roadtrains in its fleet which enjoyed a comparatively long service life (until the late 1990s) before being replaced by the newer DAF 85. Sales were never quite satisfactory, however, with the vacation closure extended in 1986 to reduce unsold stock.

Production ended in 1990, a few years after the sale of Leyland Trucks to Dutch firm DAF in 1987, although as a postscript DAF relaunched the model in low-datum form (it was already manufacturing the large DAF 95) as the DAF 80, using the Roadtrain cab with the 11.6-litre (710 cu in) DAF 330 ATi engine (quite ironic, given that this engine had its roots in the Leyland O.680). This model was produced for a relatively short time until 1993 with the launch of the brand new cabbed DAF 85.

The British Army made use of an 8x6 version of the Roadtrain as a hook loader until recently. This is known to the British Army as Medium Mobility Load System (MMLS) Demountable Rack Offload and Pickup System (DROPS), which has seen action in Iraq and Afghanistan and is still in service, but has now been replaced by the MAN version. In this format the British Army purchased 1,440 vehicles plus a significant number of spare Roadtrain cabs, to allow for accident damage.

==== Landtrain ====
The Leyland Landtrain was produced between 1980 and 1987, specifically for export markets. A bonneted design, it was built in the UK and exported in completed and kit form, the latter for local construction in Kenya and Nigeria.

===== Comet =====
The Leyland Comet was introduced in 1986, also designed for export markets mainly in the developing world. As such, it was a no-frills vehicle of a simple and sturdy design, with five- or six-speed transmissions rather than the multi-speed units used on European models. The cabin was a simplified all-steel version of that used by the Roadrunner, designed to enable local assembly. The three-axle version is called the Super Comet.

=== Diesel multiple units ===
- British United Traction DMUs
- British Rail Class 141
- British Rail Class 142
- British Rail Class 155

== Educational film ==
Leyland Motors produced a film in 1977 entitled The Quality Connection showing the importance of quality control. It featured well known actors including Frank Windsor, George A Cooper, David Suchet, Michael Robbins, Madeline Smith and Trevor Bannister.

== See also ==
- Ashok Leyland
- British Leyland Motor Corporation
- Leyland Band
- Leyland Bus
- Leyland Trucks
- List of car manufacturers of the United Kingdom
