= Leyland Retriever =

Military transport truck (WW2)

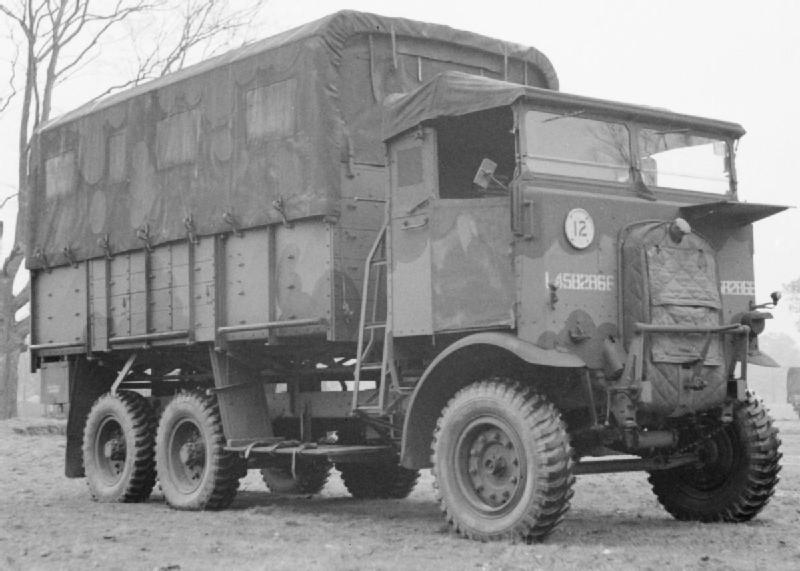
- Place of origin: United Kingdom

Production history
- Manufacturer: Leyland
- Produced: 1939-1945

The Leyland Retriever was a 6x4 truck produced by Leyland Motors for the British Army between 1939 and 1945. It had a 6-litre, 4 cylinder overhead camshaft petrol engine. General Montgomery used one as his caravan during the Second World War. This is now on display at the Imperial War Museum Duxford.

In 1940, Leyland developed the Leyland Beaver-Eel armoured truck by mounting an armoured body on the Leyland Retriever.
