= DevonBus =

Partnership responsible for overseeing the bus network in Devon, England

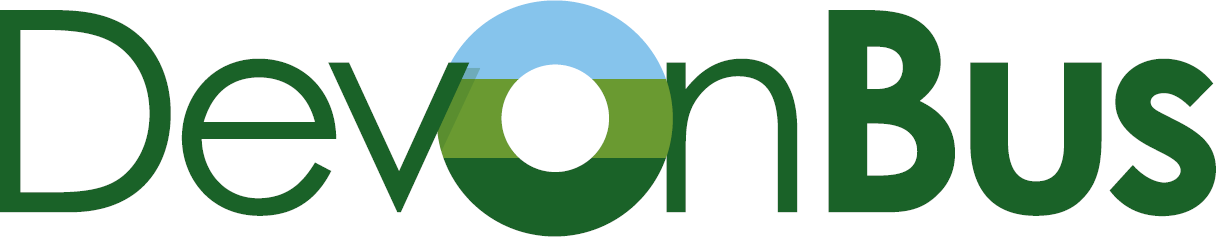

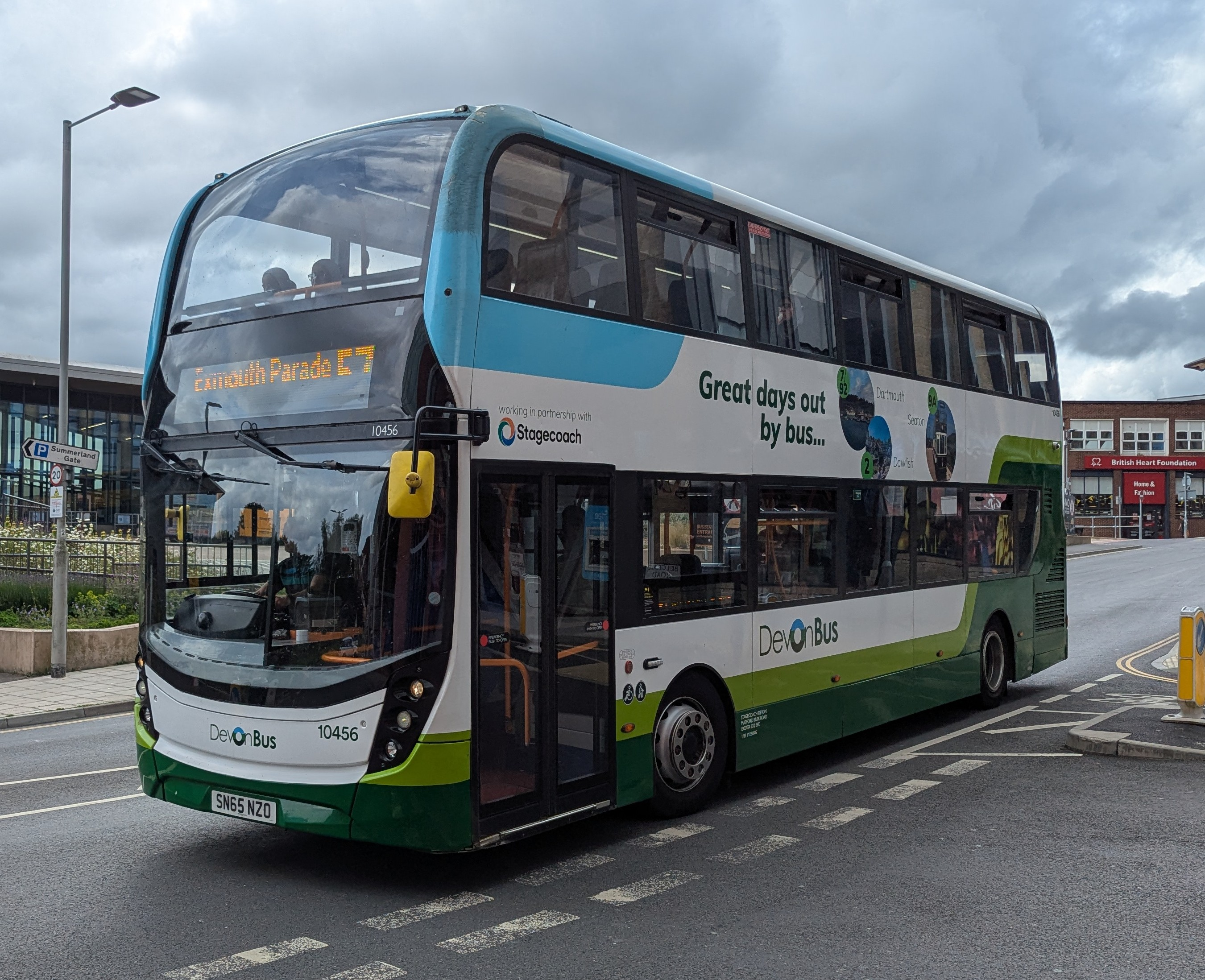
- DevonBus Enviro400 MMC operated by Stagecoach Devon in Exeter
- Parent: Devon County Council
- Founded: October 17, 2022
- Service area: Devon, England, United Kingdom
- Service type: Enhanced Partnership (Bus Services Act 2017)
- Operator: Axe Valley Mini Travel; Country Bus; First South West (FirstGroup); Stagecoach Devon (Stagecoach Group); Tally Ho Coaches; Dartline (Go-Ahead Group); Hatch Green Coaches; MD Buses; Oakley's Coaches; Plymouth Citybus (Go-Ahead Group); Redwoods Travel; Taw & Torridge Coaches; (Note: Filers Travel was a participant of DevonBus, but entered administration on 1 September 2025)
- Cabinet Member responsible: Meg Booth, Director for Climate Change, Environment and Transport
- Website: devonbus.org

DevonBus is an Enhanced Partnership between local government and bus operators responsible for the development and improvement of the bus network in Devon, England.

It subsidises most non-Stagecoach services as "Supported Services", and has control over timetable, route and fares on these services.

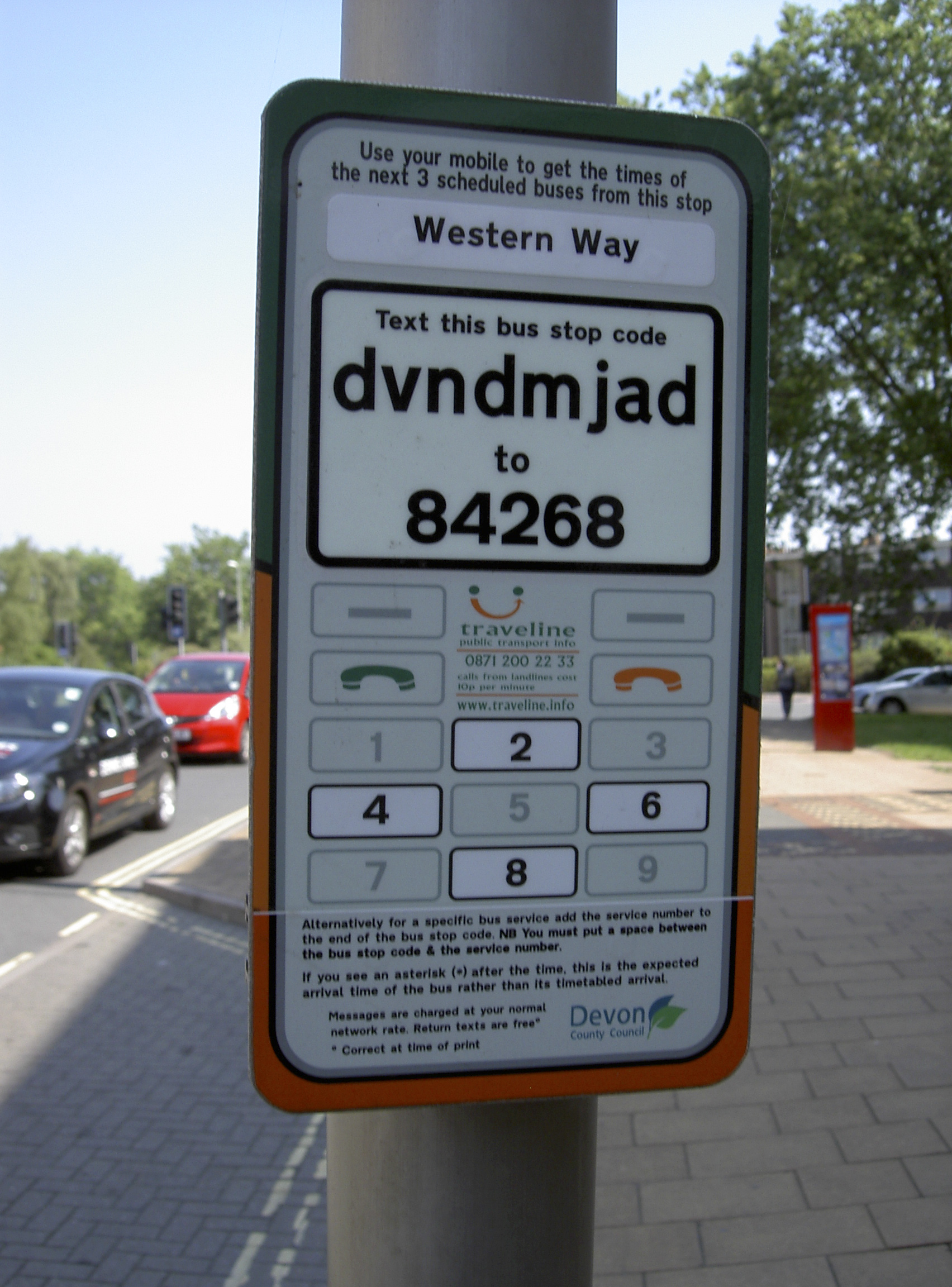
A sign for the Traveline operated "text for bus times" at a bus stop in Exeter

Traveline South West operates the "text for bus times" service alongside the real-time information service, which is jointly operated by bustimes.org.

== History ==
In early 2021, the Government announced the Bus Back Better strategy for buses in England. Part of the strategy included an expectation that local authorities would form Enhanced Partnerships, which were introduced with the Bus Services Act 2017, with local bus operators.

In June 2021, Devon County Council approved the creation of an Enhanced Partnership for Devon. Later, on 17 October 2022, DevonBus was formed.

The partnership was a finalist for the Partnership for Excellence category in the UK Bus Awards 2025.

== Members ==
There are 13 participating operators in DevonBus:

- Axe Valley Mini Travel
- Country Bus
- First South West (FirstGroup)
- Stagecoach Devon (Stagecoach Group)
- Tally Ho Coaches
- Dartline (Go-Ahead Group)
- Hatch Green Coaches
- MD Buses
- Oakley's Coaches
- Plymouth Citybus (Go-Ahead Group)
- Redwoods Travel
- Taw & Torridge Coaches

== Brand ==
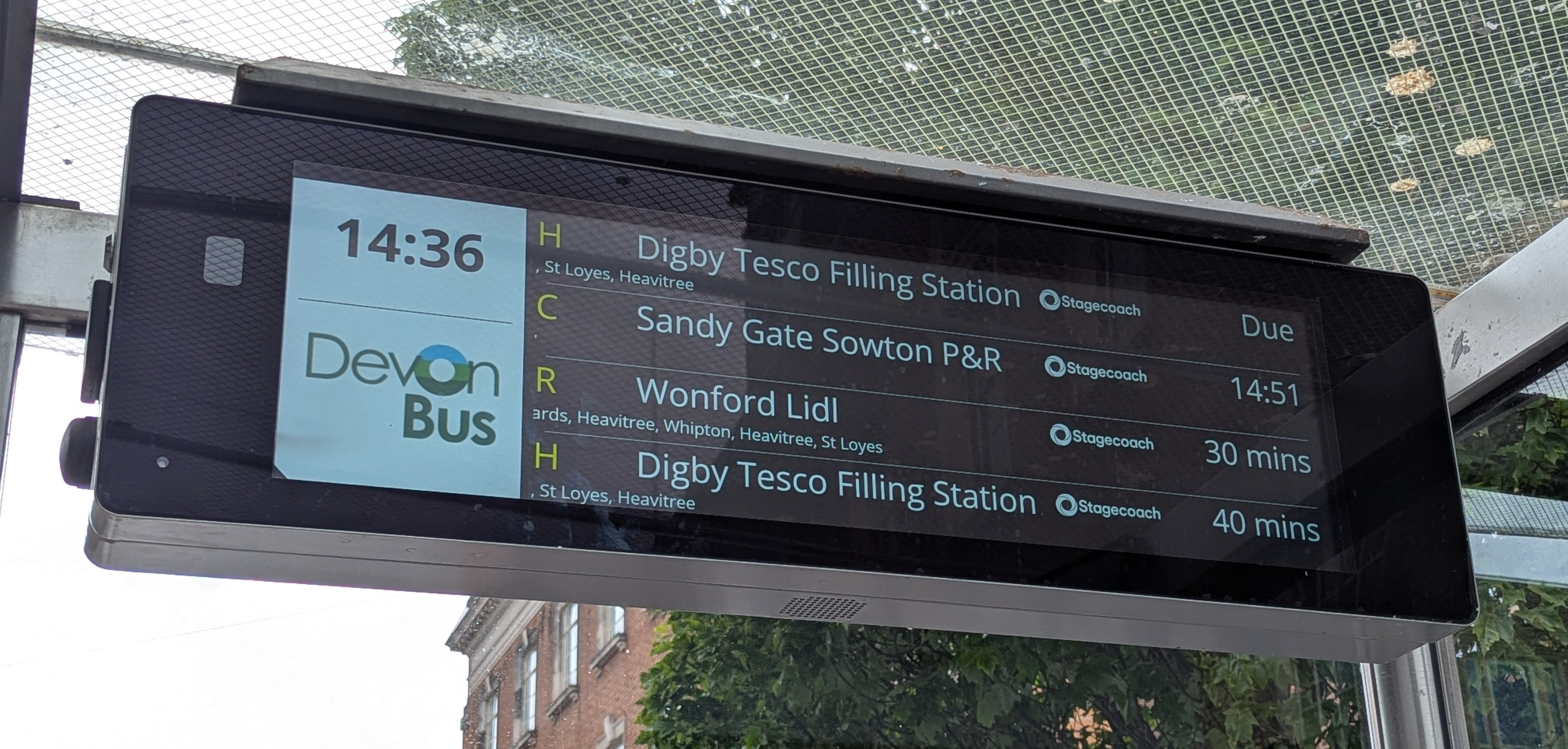
DevonBus branded real-time information display

A primary function of DevonBus is brand unification.

Most operators continue to run buses under their own brand, however a Stagecoach bus wears DevonBus livery as a celebration of the partnership. Most digital bus signage in Devon now displays the DevonBus brand where they previously displayed the Stagecoach or Devon County Council brand.

DevonBus aims to expand its branding across the network.

== See also ==
- Devon County Council
- Devon Metro
- Stagecoach South West
