= Pauline Bradley =

British banker

Pauline Bradley is a corporate lawyer and former bank director, described by the Scotland Herald as 'one of Scotland's most powerful women' .

== Career ==
Pauline Bradley joined Bank of Scotland in 1991, and set up and directed the Joint Ventures unit in 1999. The unit pursued a strategy of taking equity stakes in asset backed businesses, and built up a £10 billion portfolio under her management, including joint ventures with Ann Gloag and Brian Souter of Stagecoach Group. Bradley left in 2005. Bank of Scotland received a government bail out to prevent collapse in 2008.

Between 2005 and 2006 Bradley was Chief Executive at the Kenmore property group, one of Bank of Scotland's largest clients, which went into administration in 2009.

Pauline Bradley subsequently joined Derek Quinlan's Quinlan Private as Head of Transactions, and oversaw the £792 million acquisition of the Jury's Inn hotel chain, and the £1.1 billion acquisition of the Marriott Hotels group in 2007. Derek Quinlan resigned from Quinlan Private in 2009 with personal debts estimated at 600 million euros. Marriott Hotels went into administration in 2011, Royal Bank of Scotland taking control of the chain when its holding company defaulted on a £700 million bank loan.

== Involvement in closure and redevelopment of Manston Airport ==
In November 2013 Bradley became co-director with Ann Gloag of Manston Skyport Ltd, which acquired Manston Airport in Kent, from New Zealand company Infratil for a token payment of £1. Despite assurances of ongoing investment in aviation activity given to staff and local politicians, the airport was closed shortly after in May 2014, with 144 redundancies. The aviation related assets were auctioned off. In September 2014 Bradley became the sole founding director of Lothian Shelf 718 Ltd (later renamed Stone Hill Park Ltd), a company set up to acquire and redevelop the 800-acre site for housing. UK Companies House records show Lothian Shelf 718/Stone Hill Park as being funded by a wholly owned subsidiary of Highland Global Transport (parent company of Stagecoach Group), Kent Facilities Ltd.

Bradley's involvement in the Manston closure came under close scrutiny in February 2015 when she was called to give evidence before the Parliamentary Transport Select Committee. The chair of the committee, Louise Ellman MP, suggested to Bradley that, in light of her ongoing directorship of Lothian Shelf 718, and the company's funding by Ann Gloag, Manston Skyport's claim to have sold the Manston site on to "regeneration specialists' could be "deliberately misleading".

In June 2015 Bradley, still a director of Stone Hill Park, became a director of Stagecoach and Manston Skyport parent Highland Global Transport Ltd.
