= Ann Gloag =

Scottish business woman and activist (born 1942)

Dame Ann Gloag DBE
- Born: Ann Heron Souter; 10 December 1942 (age 83); Perth, Scotland
- Education: Perth High School
- Known for: Co-founder, Stagecoach Group
- Spouse(s): Robin Gloag (divorced) David McCleary (m. 1990)
- Children: 1
- Relatives: Sir Brian Souter (brother)
- Website: The Gloag Foundation

Ann Heron Gloag (née Souter; born 10 December 1942) is a Scottish businesswoman, activist, and charity campaigner. She is co-founder of the transport company Stagecoach Group.

According to The Sunday Times Rich List in 2024, Gloag and her brother, Sir Brian Souter, are worth £815 million, an increase of £35 million from the previous year.

In 2023, Gloag put Beaufort Castle, her Category A listed residence in the Scottish Highlands, up for sale at £7.5 million. Located near Kiltarlity, 13 miles west of Inverness, the castle was originally built in the 12th century and then rebuilt in 1880. Gloag purchased the historic estate, which includes a 26-bedroom principal property, a chapel, six residential cottages and 127 acres of land, in 1994 for approximately £1.5 million.

== Biography ==
Gloag was educated at Caledonian Road Primary School and Perth High School. She later qualified as a nurse and during a 20-year career worked as a burn unit sister. She is ranked as Scotland's richest woman. Gloag is a trustee of charity Mercy Ships and was involved in its creation of a hospital ship.

=== Stagecoach ===
Using her father's (a bus driver) redundancy money, and working with her brother Brian Souter, and her first husband Robin, Gloag established the Stagecoach Group in 1980, running buses from Dundee to London. Expansion continued and in the early 1990s, Stagecoach acquired National Bus Company operations in Cumberland, Hampshire, East Midlands: Ribble, Southdown and the United Counties. Stagecoach bought further bus operations in Scotland, Newcastle and London, with Manchester being added in 1993.

=== Manston Airport ===
In November 2013, Gloag took ownership of Kent International Airport, also known as Manston Airport, for the sum of £1. Gloag's co-director was Pauline Bradley, a corporate lawyer and former head of joint ventures at Bank of Scotland, described by The Herald as "one of Scotland's most powerful women".

Despite assurances to staff on the long-term investment in the airport, management announced a consultation on closure in April 2014. Uncertainty about the airport's future led flight operators that were using Manston to leave, notably KLM, which was running a twice-daily service to Amsterdam Schiphol. A number of bids were forthcoming during the consultation period to buy and run the airport, but, on 15 May 2014, Manston was closed with the loss of 144 jobs in the airport and an unknown number in the surrounding area. Gloag did not appear publicly or give a reason for the airport's closure or her refusal to sell.

The trade union Unite said it would challenge the way the consultation on closure was conducted. Sir Roger Gale, Member of Parliament for Thanet North, described Gloag's actions as an act of "corporate vandalism".

As of 2016, Gale and pressure groups including Save Manston Airport and Why Not Manston? continue to campaign for the reopening of the airport and have opposed alternative uses. In May 2014, Prime Minister David Cameron, in answer to a question from Gale in the Houses of Commons, stated that the future of Manston was the responsibility of the airport owner, but the Government was in negotiation with Gloag. In July 2017, planning inspectors rejected an appeal stating that the site was protected for aviation use under EC4 regulations.

== Personal life ==
Gloag has owned Beaufort Castle near Inverness since 1995, and Kinfauns Castle, near Perth since 2004. She has attempted to block off private access at Kinfauns. On 12 June 2007, a court ruled that she was legally entitled to bar the public from an area of woodland in the grounds of Kinfauns Castle.

With her first husband, Robin Gloag, she had a son, Jonathan. Ann and Robin divorced in 1983. Jonathan was married to Sarah, daughter of Ann's second husband David McClearly. Jonathan committed suicide in 1999, aged 28. Robin was killed in a car crash on 6 December 2007.

In 1990, Gloag married David McCleary, a widower and a successful owner of multiple businesses, who was previously an organist and minister at the local Church of the Nazarene.

A member of the Church of the Nazarene and an ex-nurse, Gloag founded the Freedom From Fistula Foundation. She has funded the 'Aberdeen Women’s Centre' in Freetown, Sierra Leone and a Fistula Care Centre at Bwaila Hospital in Lilongwe in Malawi.

After meeting Adam Friedman, Gloag became executive producer of Shout Gladi Gladi, a documentary film explaining the medical and social issues surrounding obstetric fistula in Africa. She also supports international aid charities and has adopted a Kenyan boy, Peter, now aged 30, as well as a 6-year-old Kenyan grandson.

On 20 January 2023, the BBC reported that, together with her husband and two other family members, Gloag had been charged with criminal offences involving human trafficking. She disputed the charges. In October 2024, the Crown Office and Procurator Fiscal Service announced that the charges against all four defendants had been dropped and no further action would be taken.

== Awards and recognitions ==
Gloag was appointed a Dame Commander of the Order of the British Empire (DBE) in the 2019 New Year Honours list for services to business and to philanthropy; she had previously been appointed Officer of the Order of the British Empire (OBE) in the 2004 Birthday Honours for charitable services.
