= Shout Gladi Gladi =

- film poster
- Directed by: Adam Friedman; Iain Kennedy
- Written by: Iain Kennedy
- Produced by: Lois Boyle; Patti Cohoon; Iain Kennedy; Roma Torre; Jacqueline Vorhauer
- Narrated by: Meryl Streep
- Cinematography: Marty Mullin; Jacqueline Vorhauer
- Edited by: Sean MacGowan
- Music by: Odd Nosdam
- Production companies: Freedom From Fistula Foundation; Vertical Ascent
- Distributed by: International Film Circuit
- Release date: October 2, 2015 (United States)
- Running time: 100 minutes (festival); 80 minutes (theatrical)
- Countries: United States; United Kingdom
- Language: English

Shout Gladi Gladi is a 2015 American-British documentary film about the obstetric fistula problem in Africa, co-directed by Adam Friedman and Iain Kennedy, narrated by Meryl Streep, and named for the celebration held after women completed treatment.

== Background ==
It is estimated that 2 million women in Africa contract obstetric fistula during labor, and while more than 500,000 die each year during pregnancy or childbirth, 80% of these deaths are avoidable. The film documents the people who have set a goal to rescue African women from the medical condition which causes affected women to become societal outcasts. Filmed in Kenya, Malawi and Sierra Leone, the film speaks toward Ann Gloag, a former nurse who pushes the movement to save these women, efforts to help the patients themselves, and speaks toward heir stories of personal struggle and triumph. The film ends with the Gladi Gladi ceremony, a singing and dancing celebratory event marking the day the women return home cured.

== Production ==
Friedman had first met Ann Gloag in 2008, and after learning of her project, decided to make a film documenting her efforts. The film was eventually written by Iain Kennedy and co-directed by Kennedy and Adam Friedman, and produced by Friedman's Vertical Ascent in collaboration with The Freedom From Fistula Foundation, an organization founded and run by Scottish businesswoman, Ann Gloag. The foundation partnered with Opportunity Bank in Malawi to provide the newly cured with a small solar-panel powered generator called a "BBOXX", to allow the women to earn money by charging fees to charge cell-phones, thus providing them with a business opportunity and allowing them to "become masters of their own destiny."

According to Adam Friedman, "Filming ‘Shout’ was an extraordinary experience. My wife and I were stopped at gunpoint in Malawi and were one of the last film crews shooting in Sierra Leone as the Ebola plague descended. But throughout, the wonderful people of Africa and the amazing work that Ann's groups were doing inspired us to keep on keeping on.”

Friedman was surprised at Meryl Streep's interest in being a part of the film. He had originally wished a narrator of her caliber, but did not think it was even possible. Urged by an acquaintance of his sister's, he sent Streep a copy of the film. One week later he received word from her office that she felt Gladi was so powerful a film she "felt the need to be involved."

Meryl Streep stated "This powerful film attests to the igniting power of one woman, Ann Gloag, to set in motion hundreds of helping hands, doctors, nurses, caregivers, family and friends, to resuscitate the health and status of victims of fistula, and to give them back their lives."

The first cut of the film was completed in September 2015, and according to Friedman, it was only missing the key piece of Meryl Streep.

== Cast ==
- Meryl Streep as Narrator
- Ann Gloag
- Wole Soyinka
- Melinda Gates

Participants:

- Florence Banda
- Ibrahim Bangura
- Isaac Balla-Bangura
- Dr. Nina Batchelor
- Lois Boyle
- Yayah Conteh
- Chris Baker-Brian
- Juliette Bright
- Sydneylyn Faniyan
- Bernadette Fofanah
- Elfrida Fomba
- Nurse Frida
- Dr. Tagie Gbawuru-Mansaray
- Hawa Hawatouri
- Jude Holden Dr.
- Dr. Stephen Kaliti
- Adama Kamara
- Isatu Kamara
- Dr. Sarian Kamara
- Bornor Kargbo
- Stephen Katumo
- Yata Lahai
- Vanesia Laiti
- Margaret Moyo
- Chief Of Mphendu
- Lucy Mwangi
- Ngbai Aminita
- Carolynne Nkomo
- Philippa Richards
- Mandetiti Sisi
- Omar Scott
- Dr. Edwin Stephen
- Ami Talibeh
- Dorthe Tate
- Dr. Roland Taylor
- Jeff Wilkinson

== Recognition ==
The Los Angeles Times praised the project, writing "the film can feel like an infomercial for the foundation, but that doesn't stop the power of the stories from coming through."

The New York Times noted the film did not shy away from disturbing imagery and also praised the film, writing "If your job is to make a depressing movie about a particularly unpleasant medical condition, poverty and ruined lives, maybe you should look for a celebrity narrator. The filmmakers behind “Shout Gladi Gladi,” set in Sierra Leone and Malawi, found Meryl Streep, and her sympathy-rich voice does temper the horror and add glamour."

The Hollywood Reporter wrote that the film was an "inessential doc about a charity doing badly needed work," but praised Ann Gloag and Adam Friedman for their bringing attention to medical shortcomings in Africa. They wrote "It's tough work making a feel-good doc about obstetric fistula, a horrific condition afflicting millions of women and girls in Africa, but the celebratory title of Shout Gladi Gladi signals that Adam Friedman intends to do just that," and concluded "The film is most intellectually stimulating when it ventures outside her group, to get big-picture commentary on public-health charities from Melinda Gates and Nobel laureate Wole Soyinka."

Film Journal International also praised the filmmakers, writing, "Fistula is the subject of this supremely compassionate documentary—not an easy subject, but the filmmakers should be saluted for tackling it in such an intelligent and thorough manner."
