= Robin Gloag =

British businessman (1943–2007)

Robin Nicol Gloag
- Born: 1943; Scotland
- Died: 5 December 2007 (age 64); Perth, Scotland
- Occupation: Businessman
- Known for: A founder of Stagecoach Group

Robin Nicol Gloag (1943 – 5 December 2007) was a British person who was one of the founders, with Brian Souter and Ann Gloag, of Stagecoach Group, one of the UK's largest transport businesses.

== Life ==
On leaving school, Robin Gloag initially worked as a petrol station manager. In 1980 he and his wife, Ann, bought two old buses and established their own bus business running services from Dundee to London: Robin acted as driver and maintenance man of what became Stagecoach Group.

He ceased active involvement in the firm and sold his shareholding in Stagecoach in 1983 with the collapse of his marriage to Ann. Robin founded Highwayman Coaches of Errol, Scotland the same year.

Gloag was killed in a car crash in December 2007. The car he was driving left the road and overturned in a field near Perth. No other vehicles were involved in the accident. He was pronounced dead at the scene.

== Family ==
Robin was married twice, first to Ann née Souter (divorced 1983), and later to Shirley.

In 1999, Robin and Ann Gloag's son, Jonathan (aged 28), died by suicide in Perthshire. Jonathan Gloag was married at the time of his death to Sarah, daughter of Ann Gloag's second husband, David McCleary.
