= Stagecoach South West =

Bus operator in South West England and Guernsey

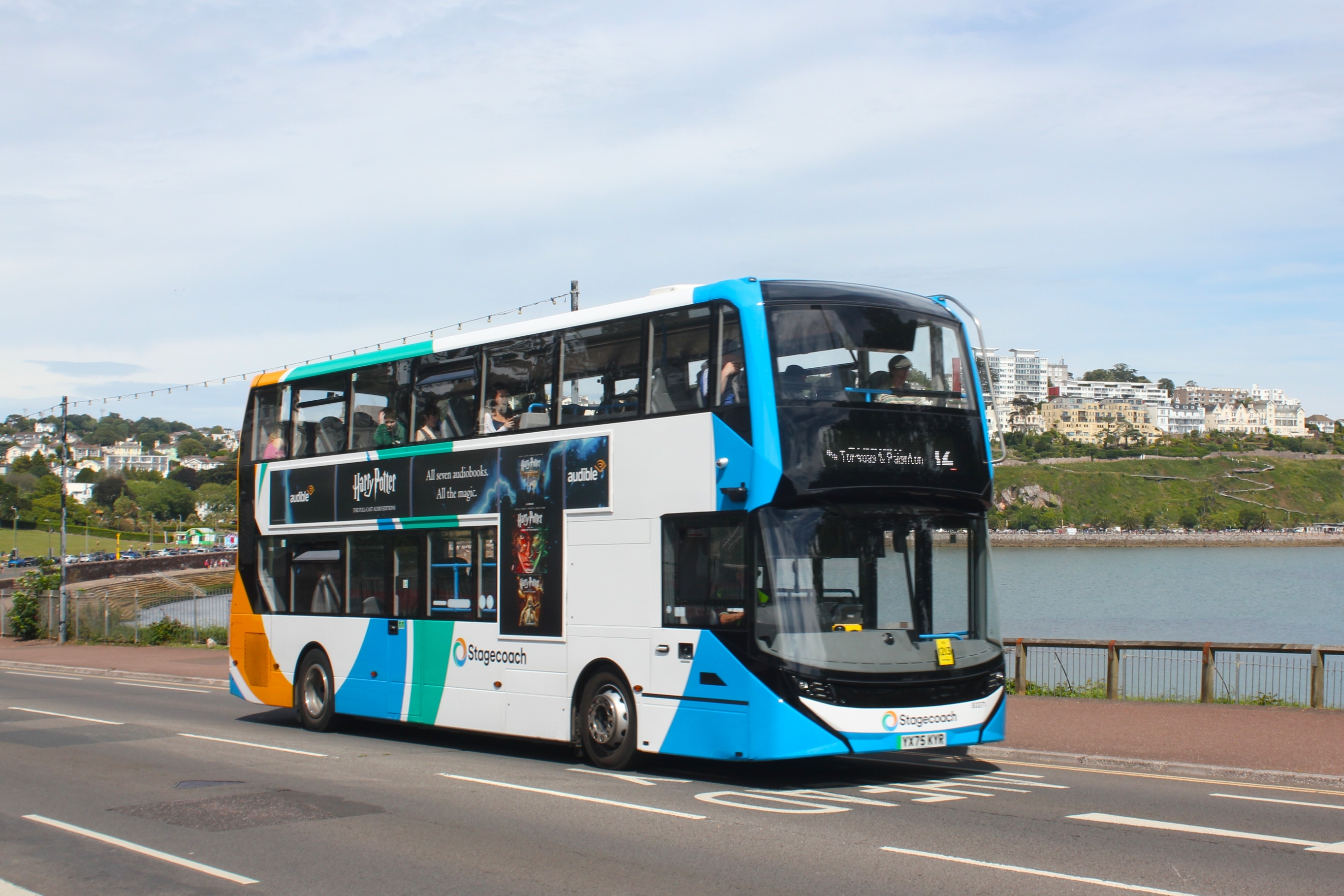
- Enviro400EV at Torquay in 2026
- Parent: Stagecoach
- Founded: 1919
- Headquarters: Exeter
- Service area: Bristol, Devon, East Cornwall, Guernsey and Somerset
- Service type: Bus services
- Depots: 6 (September 2013)
- Fleet: c. 400
- Website: stagecoachbus.com/about/south-west

Stagecoach South West is a bus operator providing services in Devon, East Cornwall and Guernsey, along with coach services to Bristol. It is a subsidiary of Stagecoach.

== History ==
=== Devon General ===
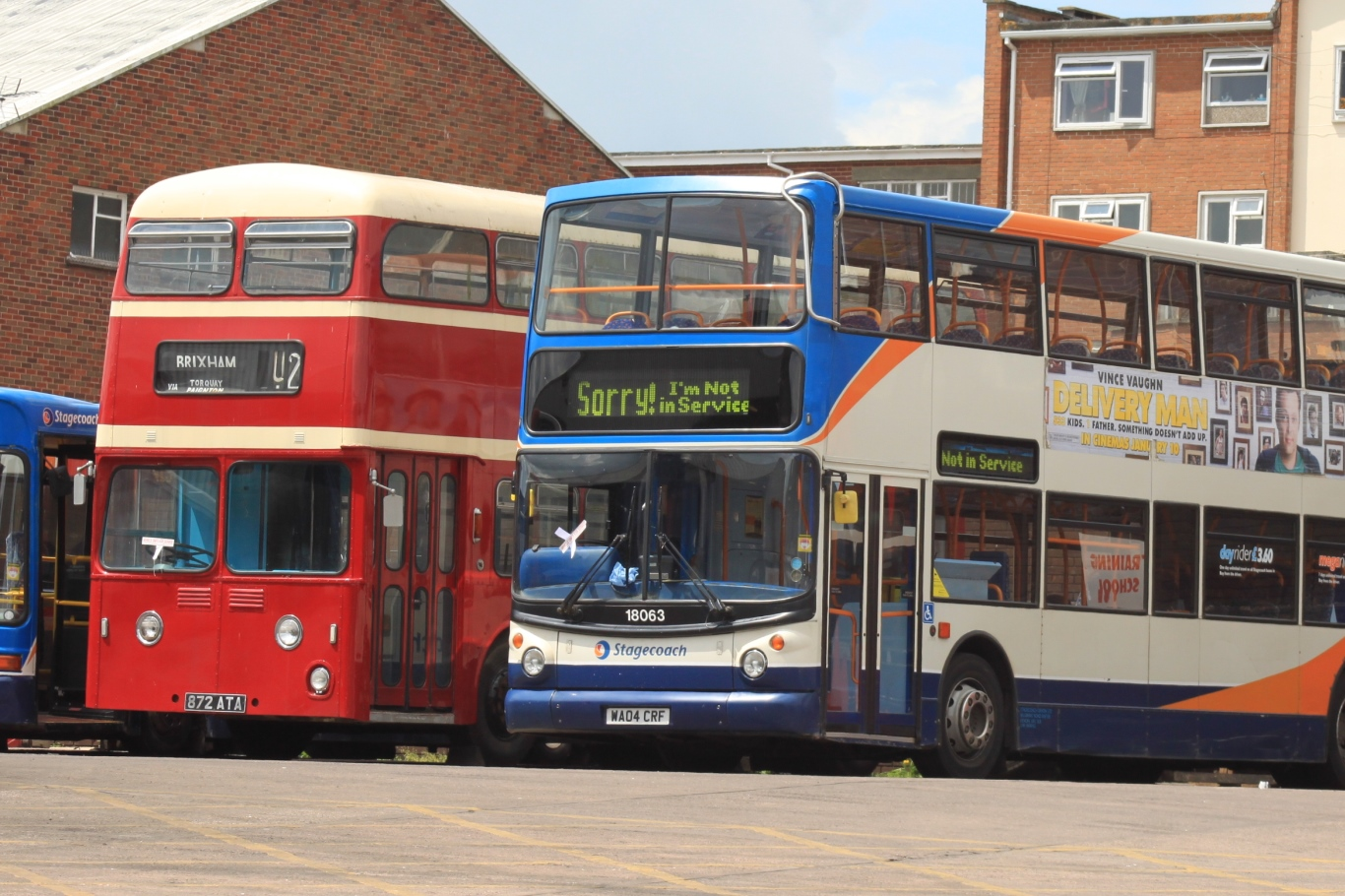
A preserved Devon General Leyland Atlantean and modern Stagecoach Alexander ALX400 bodied Dennis Trident 2 (Exeter depot, June 2014)

The Devon General Omnibus and Touring Company commenced operations in South Devon in 1919 with two bus routes from Exeter to Torquay. In 1922, Torquay Tramways purchased the company, although it was operated as a subsidiary of the National Electric Construction Company (NECC) and the tramway company's motor buses were transferred to Devon General. In 1931, the NECC became a part of the British Electric Traction Group.

British Electric Traction's bus operations, including Devon General, became part of the National Bus Company when it was formed in 1969. In April 1970, the Exeter City Council's buses and routes were transferred to Devon General but the city's unusual use of route letters (as opposed to numbers) continued. In January 1971, the bus operations of Devon General were transferred to neighbouring Western National but the Devon General name was retained as a brand.

In January 1983, Western National was split into four new companies, one of which was Devon General Limited that operated in south and east Devon as the old Devon General had done, but the Tiverton area services became part of North Devon. On 19 August 1986, Devon General became the first National Bus Company subsidiary to be privatised under the Transport Act 1985 being sold in a management buy out led by managing director Harry Blundred.

An experimental high-frequency service using 22 minibuses was introduced in Exeter on 27 February 1984. By the time the company was privatised the minibus fleet had expanded with more than 200 Ford Transits and Ivecos in service, comprising over half the fleet. By the end of 1990, all regular services had been converted to minibus operation using a mixture of 16 and 24 seat vehicles.

In 1992, the operations in Torbay and Newton Abbot were split off to a new Bayline company, while Devon General continued to operate in the Exeter area. Both companies were sold to Stagecoach in 1996, and in 2003 was rebranded Stagecoach Devon.

=== Stagecoach Devon ===
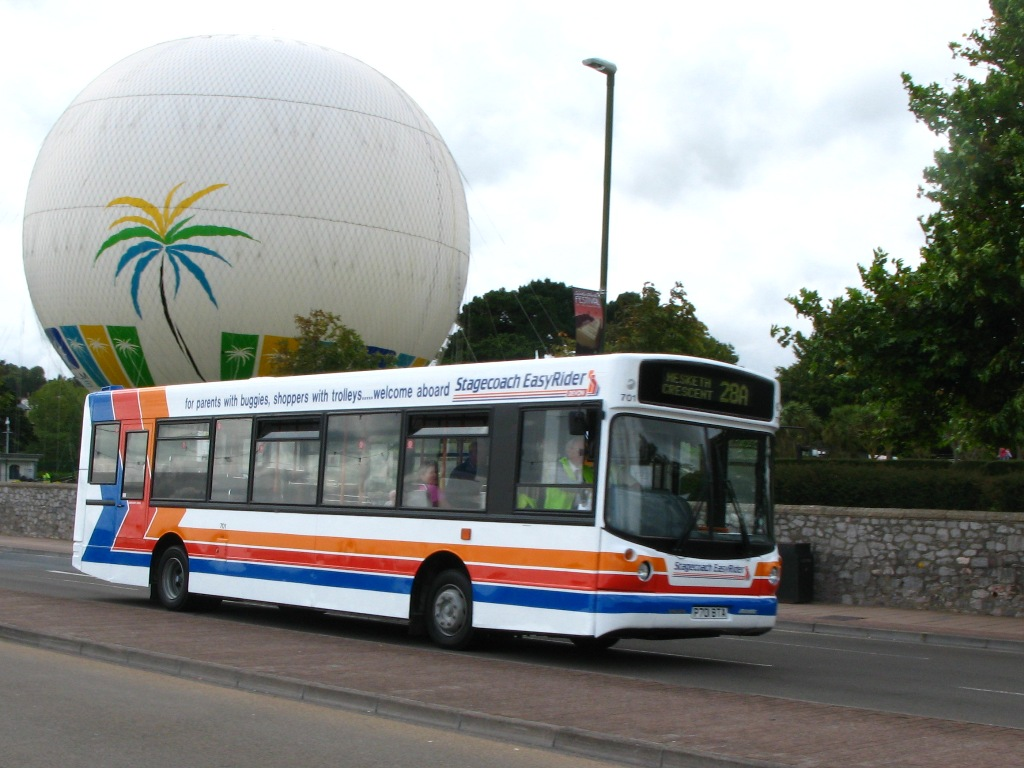
Stagecoach introduced low floor buses to the Torbay area with vehicles such as this Volvo B6LE (preserved vehicle, 2011)

During the late 1990s and early 2000s, many of the old fleet of buses were refurbished.

Minibuses have been replaced with a mixture of midibuses, double deckers, and coaches, the most recent buses being Optare Solos, Alexander Dennis Pointer bodied Dennis Dart SLFs, Dennis Trident 2s and Alexander Dennis Enviro400s, all Stagecoach Group standard bus types. Stagecoach injected some new buses after acquisition of the company including Volvo B6LEs (14), Volvo B10M coaches (6), Volvo B10M buses (7), Dennis Javelins (4) and Mercedes-Benz Varios (16) after which there were few more for some years. Stagecoach Devon's fleet was mostly cascades from other areas. Between 1997 and 2004, only six new buses entered the fleet (three Alexander ALX200s for route 56 and three Dennis Tridents for route 373 in December 2002). Since then, the company has invested heavily in new vehicles, taking on a large fleet of Dennis Tridents (21 initially) for the busy route 12 in Torbay and the new route 54 Culm Valley Connect services (8 Tridents), it was also the launch customer for the Optare Solo Slimline, with 30 for Exeter city routes. Later in 2006, Exeter services received new Alexander Dennis Pointers for city services A and H, displacing Solos onto other routes.

The company faced an industrial stoppage in July 2003 that led to cutbacks in the period afterwards. The company recovered strongly positing excellent growth in passengers and a steadily improving financial position underlined by innovative marketing, engaging in community activities, promotions including telemarketing.

The company has also been a significant winner in the 'Kickstart competition', a directly government funded initiative to provide and upgrade to services which should eventually become self-supporting. Stagecoach Devon won three such bids, the Culm Valley connect services in September 2004, the 12A South Devon College services in September 2005, and the upgrade of Exeter City services in spring 2006.

The company won tenders outside the traditional boundaries of the Devon General area and has had buses based in Yeovil since 2005, and from September 2006 opened depots at Barnstaple, Bude and Torrington after gaining tenders in the County Council tender round. The Yeovil routes are no longer operated.

The introduction of free concessionary fares to the disabled and those over 60 and the inherent organic growth in the business put considerable capacity demands on the company, which is switched to double-deck buses on many routes to cope, with older double-deckers being transferred from other Stagecoach operations. The company has campaigned for a better settlement on the fare concessions and the reimbursement from the scheme is said to be amongst the weakest in the country whilst demand is amongst the strongest. In six months concessionary demand increased 90% over the previous year.

In June 2008, Alexander Dennis Enviro400 buses were purchased for use on the new go2 service from Exeter to Newton Abbot.

In August 2008, Stagecoach announced a trial of a ferry from Torquay to Brixham using a 138-seat catamaran. Stagecoach released a leaflet explaining the details of the trial between 29 August and 27 September 2008. Included in this trial was new bus service 33 which served the ferry terminal in Torquay.

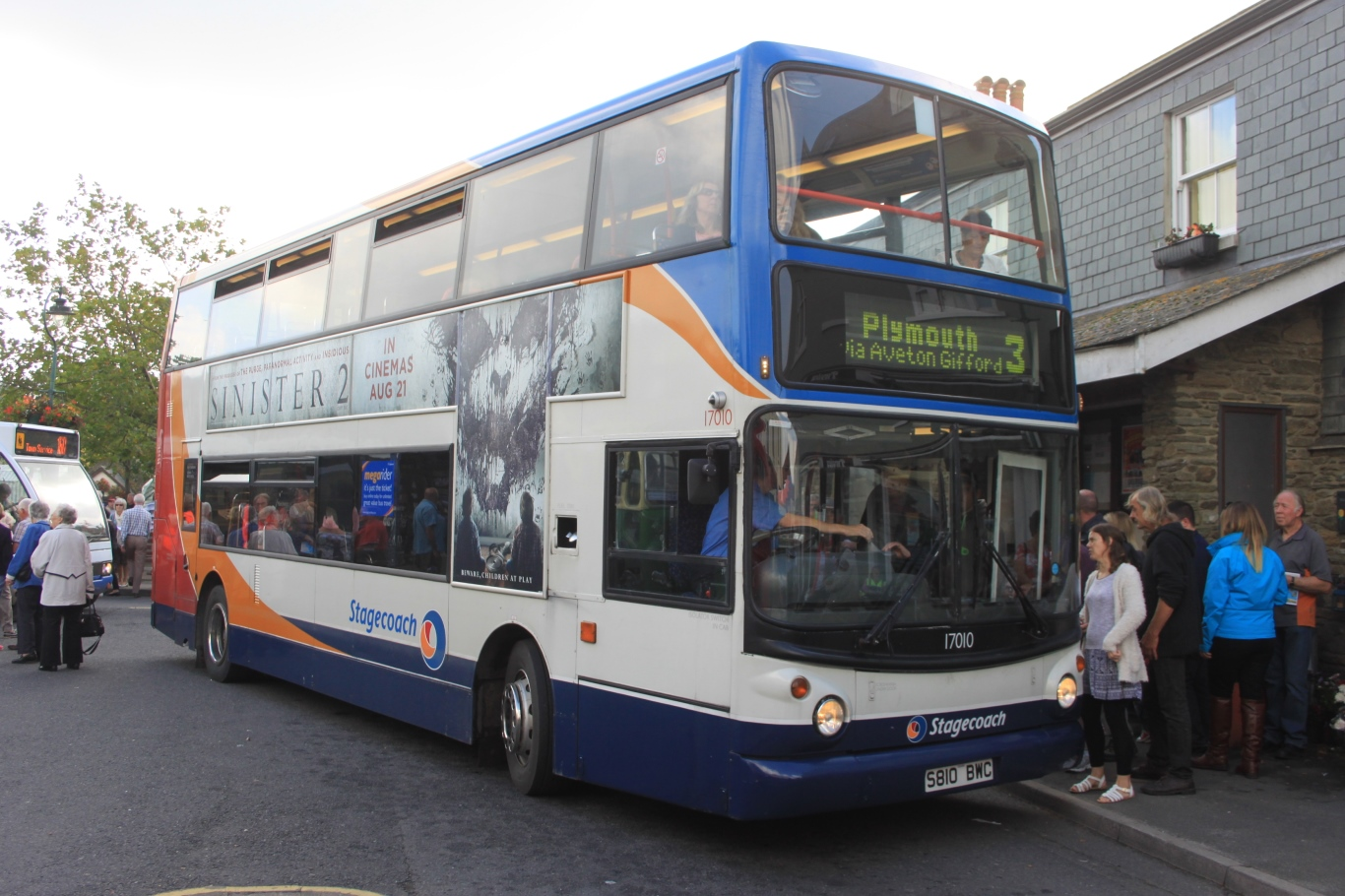
Alexander ALX400 bodied Dennis Trident 2 operating on the former First Group route 93 (Kingsbridge, September 2015)

On 6 September 2015, the Plymouth, Dartmouth and Tavistock depots of First Devon & Cornwall were taken over.

In December 2015, new Honiton Road Park & Ride Alexander Dennis Enviro400 MMC buses were introduced (fleet numbers 10452–10455) replacing the 2009 Alexander Dennis Enviro400s (fleet numbers 19569–19572).

On the weekend of the 24/25 September 2016, all engineering for Exeter was moved from Belgrave Road to a new maintenance hub built into the Matford park & ride site on the outskirts of Marsh Barton, Exeter

In late October 2018, in Plymouth, Stagecoach took over the majority of Target Travel services throughout the city, as well as re-instating some formerly closed bus-routes.

Stagecoach Devon is a participant in the county council's DevonBus scheme.

=== Stagecoach in Somerset ===
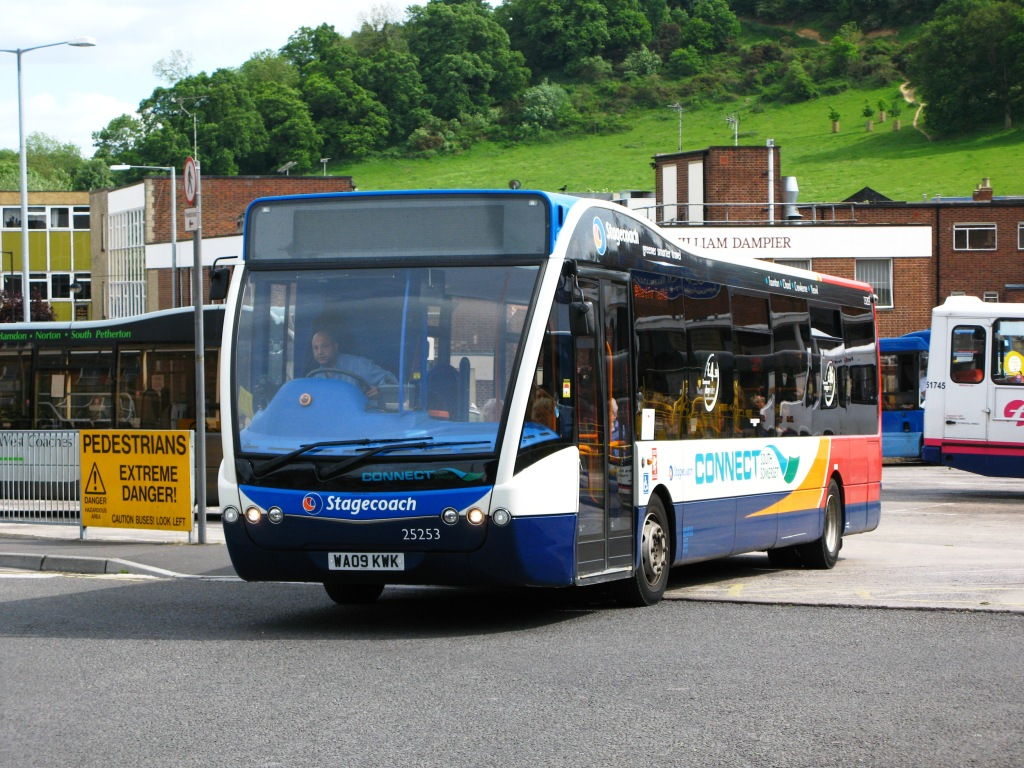
A 'Stagecoach in Somerset' Optare Versa (Yeovil, (May 2011)

In May 2007 Cooks Coaches of Wellington was purchased by Stagecoach with over 50 buses.

In 2024, Stagecoach South West won the tender to operate Taunton's Park & Ride service between Silk Mills and Gateway, servicing the local hospital and Taunton town centre. The service began on Monday 12 February, after The Buses of Somerset pulled out of the contract with Somerset Council.

=== buses.gg ===
Stagecoach South West was awarded a five-year contract to operate the buses.gg brand on Guernsey from April 2025, for the States of Guernsey's Committee for the Environment and Infrastructure. The operation had been previously run by CT Plus.

A new app and website for buses.gg was launched on 1 April 2025, the day the new operation started.

== Services ==
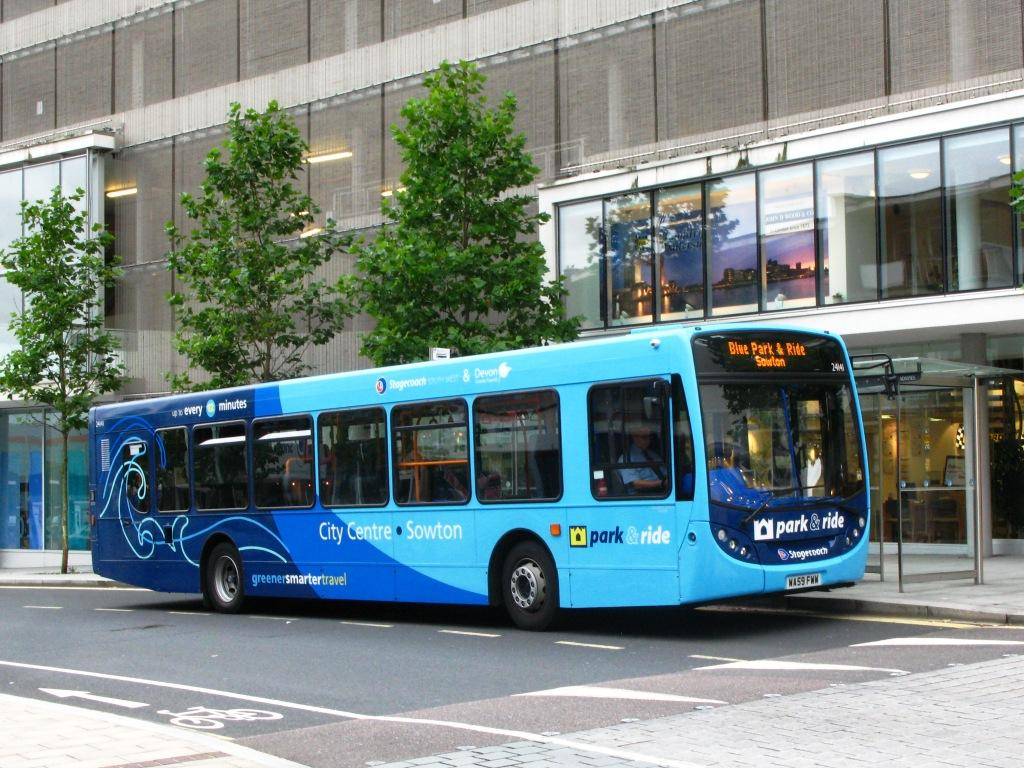
Exeter Park & Ride Alexander Dennis Enviro300 bodied MAN 18.240 in September 2010

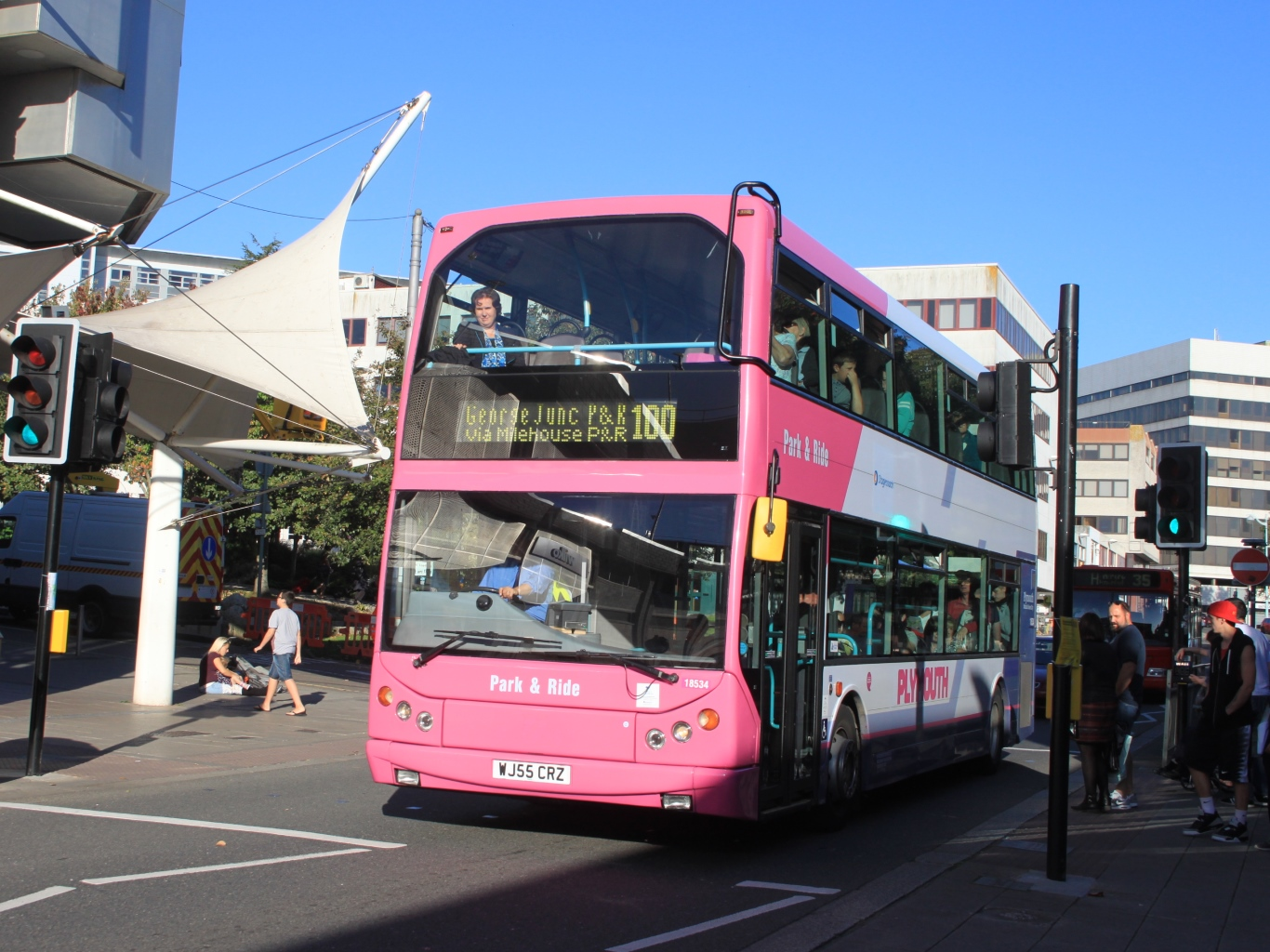
A former First Devon & Cornwall East Lancs Myllennium Lolyne retained in Plymouth for the start up of Stagecoach services in the city

From a slow start, Exeter became one of the first cities in the United Kingdom to have a fleet of entirely low-floor buses after introduction of the buses to the A and H service.

Changes to routes in Exeter in September 2007 caused complaints from residents of the affected areas. The following month, Devon County Council announced that it would fund Stagecoach until March 2008 to restore some of these services after the council received more than 80 letters from passengers. The services resumed partially in late October and fully in November,

Operation of three park & ride services for Exeter started in December 2009 using 13 buses painted in special colours.

Two Stagecoach Gold routes were introduced in September 2013 in competition with First Devon & Cornwall's routes X80 and X81. Running from Torquay to Totnes every 30 minutes they were to operate alternatively to Dartmouth and Plymouth. The service to Dartmouth has since been replaced by service 92 while the Plymouth service was renumbered 80 and lost its Gold status in September 2025. From Sunday 5th April 2026 service 92 will be replaced by an extension to service 7 (Exeter–Totnes).

First Devon & Cornwall withdrew their network of services in Plymouth and South Devon from September 2015. Stagecoach acquired their depot in Plymouth along with its outstations in Tavistock and Dartmouth, and operated a smaller network of routes that First had withdrawn. The First park and ride fleet initially remained at Plymouth on hire to Stagecoach along with buses transferred from Stagecoach Manchester and Stagecoach East Kent as well as other locations. This was a temporary solution until 22 Alexander Dennis Enviro400 MMCs and 5 Alexander Dennis Enviro200 MMCs could be delivered.

Following the overnight collapse of major Cornish operator Western Greyhound, Stagecoach were one of the operators to provide emergency replacement services.

=== South West Falcon ===
The South West Falcon service was launched in February 2016. This is a limited stop coach service between Plymouth and Bristol which serves places such as Exeter, Taunton and Bristol Airport.

== Fleet ==
As of March 2026, Stagecoach South West operate around 400 buses.

Stagecoach South West are to take delivery of a total 90 battery electric buses to its Barnstaple, Exeter and Torbay depots between 2025 and 2026 with funding from the central government Zero Emission Bus Regional Areas (ZEBRA) fund, with vehicles to be delivered including 48 Alexander Dennis Enviro400EV double-decker buses, 20 MCV single-deck bodied Volvo BZLs, twelve Yutong E10s and ten Alexander Dennis Enviro100EV midibuses.

== Depots ==
- Riverside Road, Barnstaple
- Matford Park Road, Exeter
- Les Banques, Guernsey
- The Ride, Plymstock, Plymouth
- Regent Close, Torquay

=== Outstations ===
- Potbury's Yard, Sidmouth
- Station Yard, Tiverton
- Pound Lane, Industrial Estate, Exmouth
- Bus Station, Paignton
- Langsford Park, Tavistock
- Bude

== Incidents ==
On 5 October 2019, a Stagecoach Gold bus overturned on the A385 road between Totnes and Paignton injuring 37 people, 8 seriously.

== See also ==
- DevonBus
- Open top buses in Torbay
