= Plaxton Expressliner =

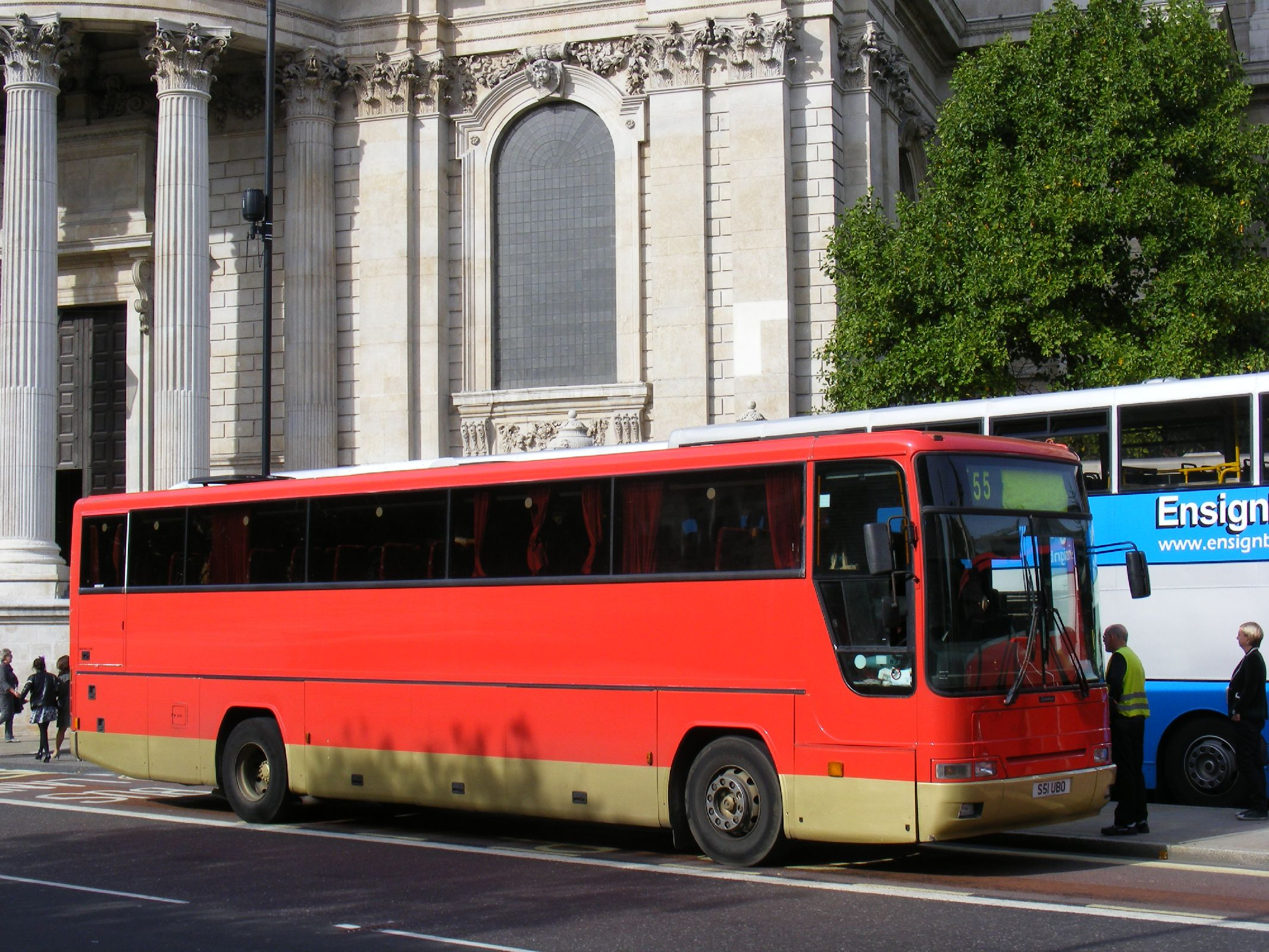
Plaxton Expressliner II with Travel With Hunny

The name Plaxton Expressliner or National Expressliner can refer to one of three designs of coach built by Plaxton for National Express use:

- The original Expressliner was a Plaxton Paramount III 3500 to National Express specification, easily recognisable from the standard Paramount by having a windowless rear end incorporating the National Express logo.
- The Expressliner II was a continuation of the same concept using the Plaxton Premiere 350 body, which replaced the Paramount.
- The Paragon Expressliner is based on the Paragon and replaced the Expressliner II in 2000.
