= Stagecoach Group =

Scottish transport group

Stagecoach Group Limited
- Formerly: Stagecoach Group plc
- Type: Private
- Industry: Public transport
- Founded: 9 April 1980
- Founders: Brian Souter; Ann Gloag; Robin Gloag
- Headquarters: Perth, Scotland, UK
- Area served: United Kingdom
- Key people: Ray O'Toole (Chairman); Sam Greer (Chief Executive)
- Products: Bus and Coach services
- Revenue: ▲£1,372.6 million (2023)
- Operating income: ▲£77.8 million (2023)
- Net income: ▼£23.2 million (2023)
- Number of employees: 24,000 (2023)
- Parent: Inframobility (DWS Group)
- Website: stagecoachbus.com

Stagecoach Group, usually shortened to Stagecoach, is a British transport group based in Perth, Scotland. It operates buses and express coaches throughout the United Kingdom.

Stagecoach was originally founded in 1976 as Gloagtrotter, a recreational vehicle and minibus hire business. During the early 1980s, it took advantage of the deregulation of the British express coach market, launching services from Dundee to London using second-hand Neoplan coaches, competing against the then state-owned National Express Coaches and Scottish Citylink. Stagecoach purchased several recently privatised national bus groups from London Regional Transport, the National Bus Company, Scottish Bus Group and various city councils, as well as pursuing those that had opted for management buyouts and employee-owned corporations. During August 1996, Stagecoach acquired roughly one-third of all passenger rolling stock in the UK via the acquisition of the recently privatised leasing company Porterbrook; it sold the company on four years later. In 1997, Stagecoach was awarded the franchise to operate the recently privatised Sheffield Supertram system. In 1998, it purchased Prestwick Airport.

Following the sale of its London bus operations to Macquarie Bank in 2006, Stagecoach UK Bus concentrated on the bus market outside the UK capital. During 2007, Stagecoach was awarded the East Midlands franchise. In July 2007, it commenced operating the Manchester Metrolink tram network. During January 2009, Stagecoach purchased Preston Bus, a former rival in the Lancashire area, but was promptly compelled to sell it by the Competition Commission. In October 2010, it expanded further by re-acquiring East London and Selkent, Stagecoach's former London bus operations. During March 2015, Virgin Trains East Coast, in which Stagecoach held a 90% shareholding, commenced operating the InterCity East Coast franchise; the franchise was terminated early three years later as it was unable to fulfil the agreed payments.

During April 2019, private equity house Variant acquired Stagecoach's US division in exchange for $271 million. In April 2019, Stagecoach was disqualified from participating in three rail franchise competitions by the Department for Transport after it submitted non-compliant bids. During September 2021, it was reported that rival company National Express entered into talks to acquire Stagecoach. In May 2022, a rival takeover offer from a DWS managed investment fund bought Stagecoach.

== History ==
=== Background and early years ===
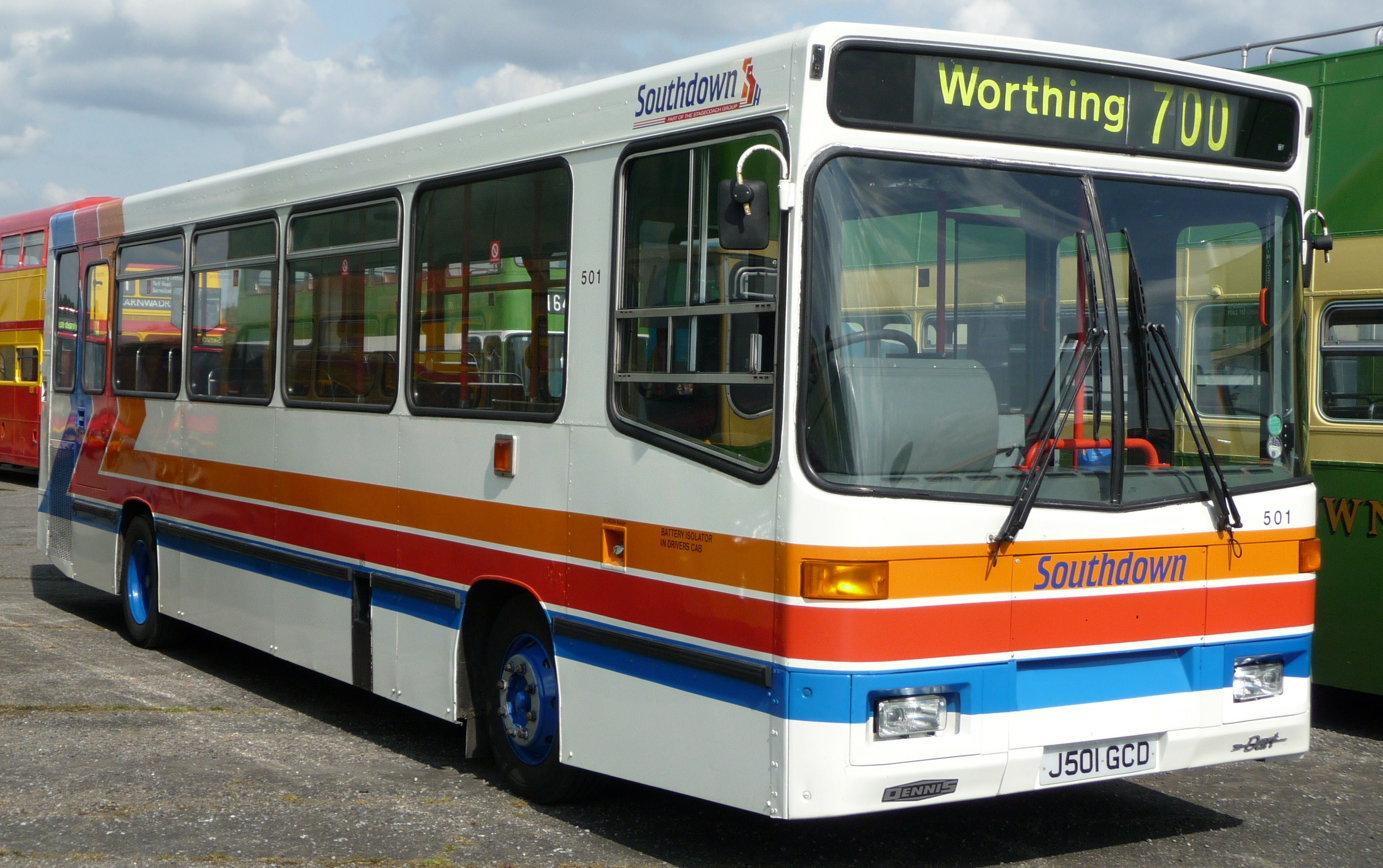
Stagecoach South Alexander Dash bodied Dennis Dart in the original 'stripes' fleet livery

The origins of Stagecoach Group can be traced back to 1976, at which point Ann Gloag and her husband Robin Gloag established a small recreational vehicle and minibus hire business called Gloagtrotter based in Perth, Scotland. Ann's brother, Brian Souter, an accountant, joined the firm and expanded the business into bus hire. In 1982, following the collapse of his marriage to Ann, Robin Gloag sold his ownership stake in the business and ceased any involvement. Around this time, the company would benefit greatly from the deregulation of the British express coach market in the early 1980s; specifically, the Transport Act 1980, which freed express services of 35 miles and over from regulation by the Traffic Commissioner, brought new opportunities for the company and services were launched from Dundee to London using second-hand Neoplan coaches. For a while, the company offered a very personal service with Brian Souter doing the driving and Ann Gloag preparing sandwiches and other snacks for the passengers.

Between 1981 and 1985, the company grew significantly, successfully competing against the then state-owned National Express Coaches and Scottish Citylink. Stagecoach entered local bus operation with the acquisition of McLennan of Spittalfield, near Perth. Its early success allowed Stagecoach to take advantage of the privatisation of the national bus groups. Several firms were purchased from London Regional Transport, the National Bus Company, Scottish Bus Group and various city councils. The company consolidated its operations during the 1990s by purchasing ex NBC and SBG bus companies that had been purchased via management buyouts and employee-owned corporations when privatised. In August 1989, Stagecoach withdrew from the long-distance express coach market, selling its operations to National Express, who rebranded the services as 'Caledonian Express'.

=== 1990s ===
Following the deregulation of bus services in the United Kingdom, Stagecoach bought a number of the newly emerged small bus companies and ran free or low fare buses to put local rivals out of business. In the 1990s, in Darlington, Stagecoach subsidiary Busways offered bounties to recruit drivers away from the existing bus service and offered free buses to deter the rival preferred bidder from taking over the existing bus service. This was "predatory, deplorable and against the public interest" according to findings from the Monopolies & Mergers Commission.

During the privatisation of British Rail, Porterbrook was formed as one of three rolling stock companies owning around a third of passenger railway locomotives, multiple units and coaching stock running on Network Rail's system which is leased to various train operators. Porterbrook was privatised via a management buyout before being purchased by Stagecoach for £825 million during August 1996. The acquisition garnered some public controversy and political criticism for the low value returned to the taxpayer. In April 2000, Stagecoach sold Porterbrook to the British banking group Abbey National in exchange for £1.44 billion.

In 1997, Stagecoach was awarded the franchise to operate the recently privatised Sheffield Supertram system, from the South Yorkshire Passenger Transport Executive, who owned the system. Stagecoach bought the remaining 27 years of a 30-year franchise in exchange for £1.15 million, which was substantially below the anticipated £80 million that the councils had hoped to raise to help pay off the accumulated debts to build the system. The franchise, which expired in March 2024, was operated under the Stagecoach Supertram brand, the company having responsibility for the operation and maintenance of the tram system. When Stagecoach took over the system, it was struggling, both financially and in terms of attracting passengers; patronage subsequently rose from 7.8 million recorded passenger journeys in 1996/97, to 15.0 million during 2011/12.

In 1998, Stagecoach diversified into another transport sector via the purchase of Scotland's Prestwick Airport in exchange for £41 million. By the summer of 1999, the company was rumoured to have been offered some £80 million for Prestwick. In January 2001, Stagecoach opted to sell the airport for £33 million to concentrate on surface transport.

=== 2000s ===
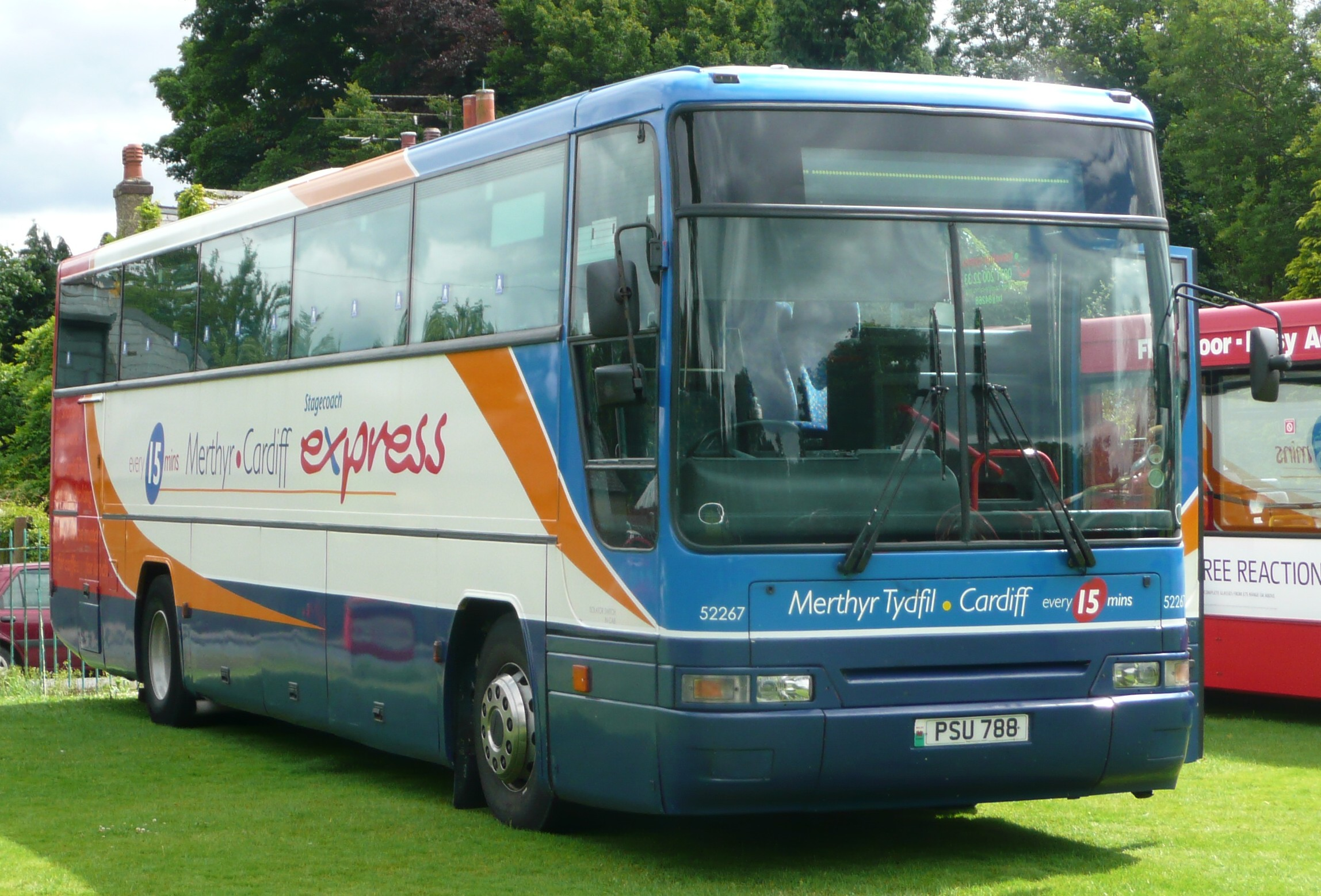
Stagecoach South Wales Plaxton Expressliner bodied Volvo B10M in the group's 'beachball' livery

The Stagecoach Group has also indirectly attracted criticism through controversial statements and actions made by its chairman and co-founder, Brian Souter, regarding certain public statements and his funding of a campaign to block the repeal of the Section 28 law. In 2000, OutRage! spokesman Peter Tatchell, called for a boycott of the bus and rail group.

In December 2000, Stagecoach Manchester was found to have been employing bus inspectors to usher passengers away from competitor's services. During 2005, alleged aggressive behaviour by Stagecoach drivers, seeking to compete with Scotbus, resulted in an arson fire at a Stagecoach East Scotland garage.

In late 2000, Stagecoach UK's bus operations were rationalised into twelve subsidiary companies managed from the group's Perth headquarters. The group was also rebranded in December 2000, with a new 'beachball' logo designed by Edinburgh design house McKinstrie Wilde Millhouse and a new fleet livery designed by Ray Stenning's Best Impressions design company for the group's buses. The new livery for regional operations consisted of 'swoops' on a grey base that retained the previous livery's red, orange, blue and white colours, while Stagecoach London buses maintained base red with blue and orange 'swoops' to the rear of the bus. A blue-based standard interior for new buses was also introduced, with the first UK buses featuring the group's new identity entering service in January 2001.

On 21 November 2005, Stagecoach announced the sale of its New Zealand operations to Infratil. On 14 December 2005, Stagecoach purchased Barnsley based Traction Group for £26 million, also assuming the group's £11 million debt. The Traction Group operated 840 buses in South and West Yorkshire (Yorkshire Traction, Barnsley & District, Yorkshire Terrier), Lincolnshire (RoadCar) and Angus (Strathtay Scottish). The Traction Group was the largest remaining privately owned independent bus operator in the UK.

Following the sale of its London bus operations to Macquarie Bank in 2006, Stagecoach UK Bus concentrated on the bus market outside the UK capital, focusing on organic growth and exploring acquisition options. In September 2005, following competition with its Megabus coach operation, Stagecoach launched a joint venture with Scottish Citylink coaches. During October 2006, a competition enquiry instructed Stagecoach to sell some of its Scottish coach services. Stagecoach was also active in the passenger rail market, having a 49% stake in Virgin Rail Group. During 2007, the group were successful in their bid for the new East Midlands franchise, which had been created by amalgamating the previous Midland Mainline franchise with the eastern part of the former Central Trains franchise.

Between 2006 and 2007, Stagecoach Manchester and UK North engaged in a bus war on route 192 and on the Wilmslow Road bus corridor that caused traffic chaos in Manchester. In November 2009, the Competition Commission ordered Stagecoach to sell Preston Bus after it had adversely affected competition in the area; the sale was completed as instructed in January 2011.

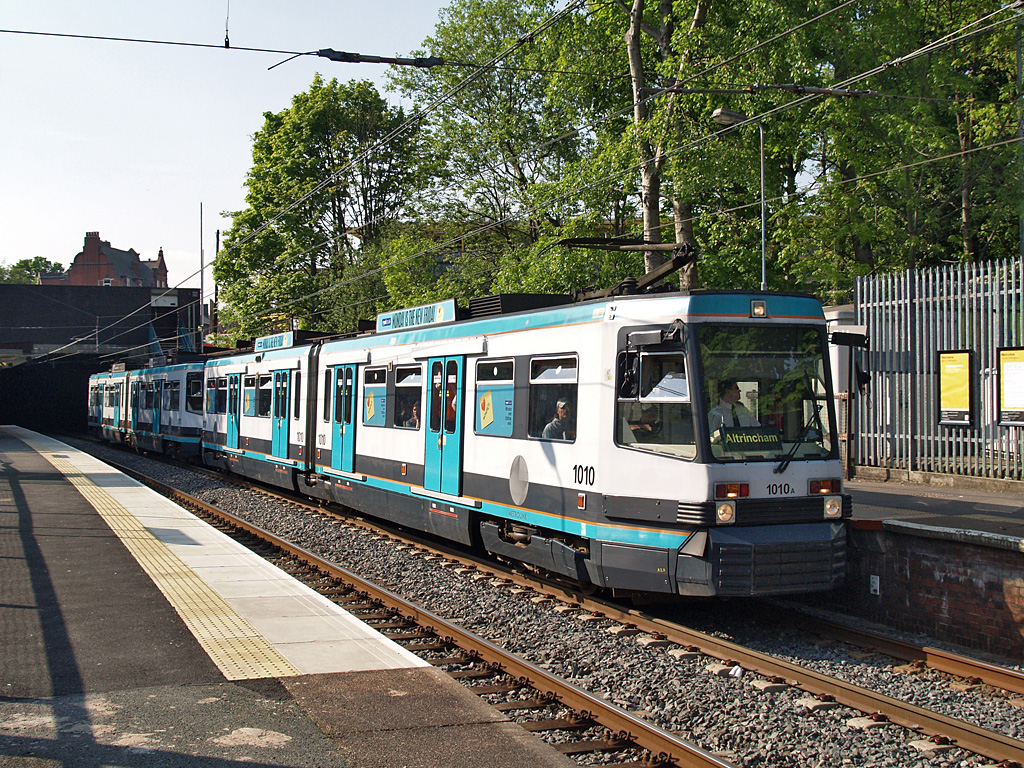
Manchester Metrolink AnsaldoBreda T-68 tram at Whitefield tram stop

During July 2007, Stagecoach commenced operating the Manchester Metrolink tram network. In January 2009, Stagecoach purchased Preston Bus, a former rival in the Lancashire area. In November 2009, the Competition Commission intervened, ordering Stagecoach to sell Preston Bus after it had adversely affected competition in the area.

=== 2010s ===
In October 2010, Stagecoach expanded further by re-acquiring East London and Selkent, Stagecoach's former London bus operations. During August 2011, Stagecoach sold its Manchester Metrolink concession to RATP Group halfway through its ten-year contract to operate the network. In December 2013, Stagecoach bought King's Lynn based Norfolk Green. During March 2015, Virgin Trains East Coast, in which Stagecoach held a 90% shareholding, commenced operating the InterCity East Coast franchise. The East Coast franchise was terminated on 23 June 2018 after it was revealed that Stagecoach had overbid and were thus unable to make the agreed franchise payments.

During December 2018, it was announced that private equity house Variant would acquire Stagecoach Group's US division in exchange for $271 million; the sale was completed in April 2019.

In April 2019, Stagecoach was disqualified from participating in three rail franchise competitions by the Department for Transport after it submitted non-compliant bids for the East Midlands, South Eastern and West Coast Partnership franchises. One month later, the company announced that it would legally challenge the disqualification.

=== 2020s ===
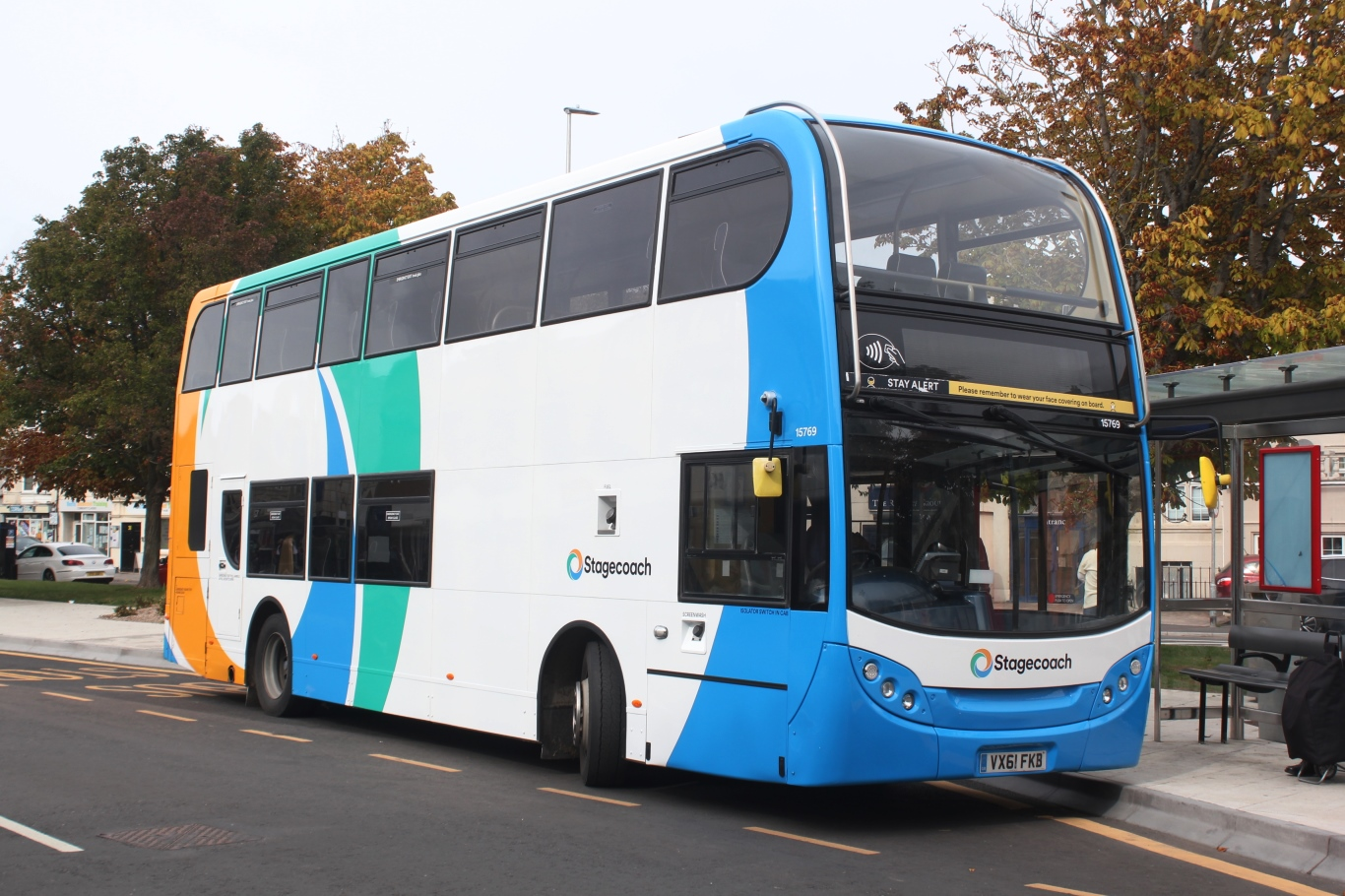
2020 local services livery on an Enviro400 of Stagecoach West in Weston-super-Mare

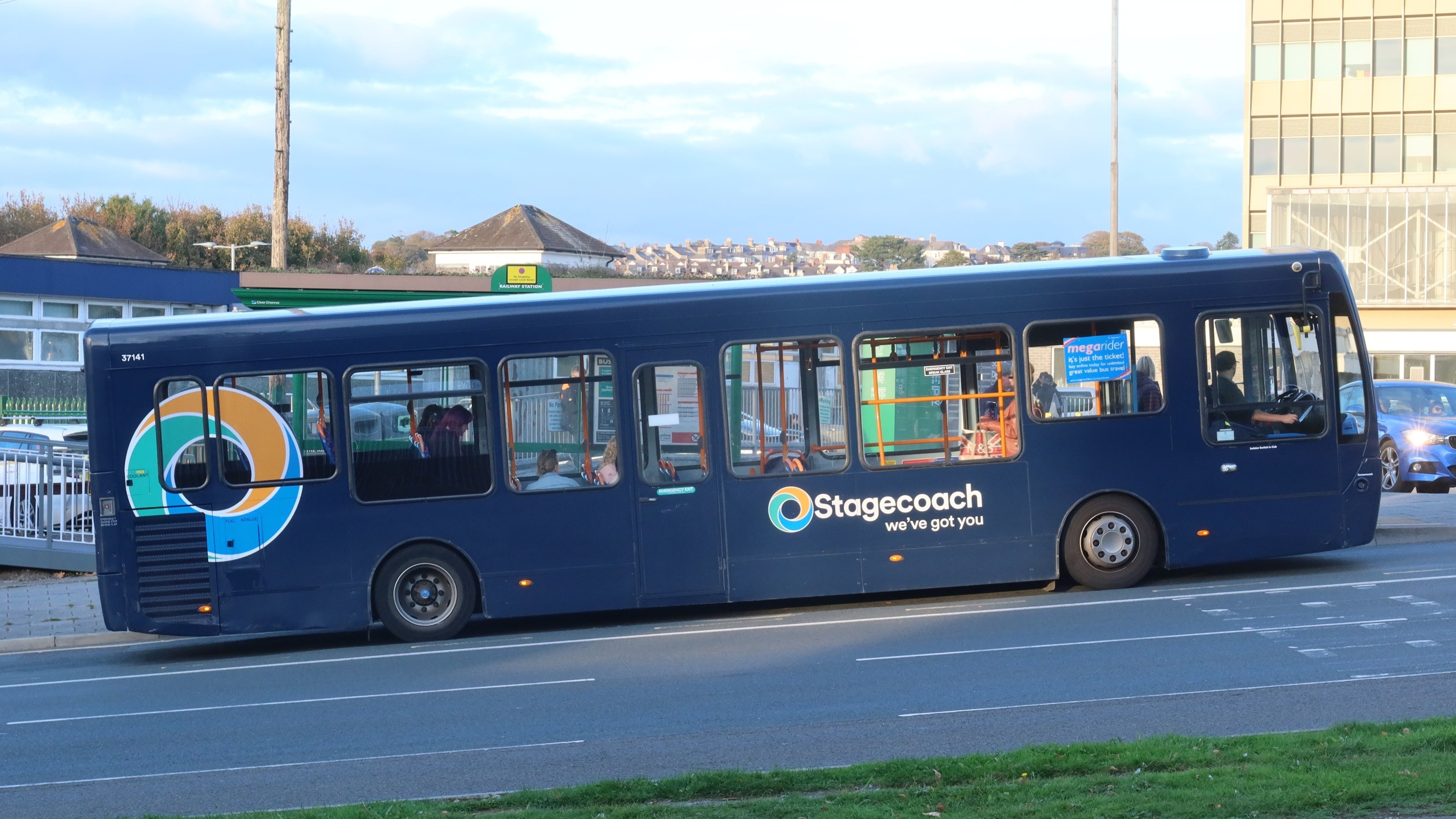
2024 steel blue livery on an Enviro200 of Stagecoach Devon in Plymouth

The Stagecoach Group rebranded its operations again in February 2020, with a new simplified 'beachball' logo introduced and a new set of liveries introduced for regional bus fleets. Three individual colour schemes were initially developed to distinguish bus services:

- Local services - white with azure blue
- Longer distance - amber yellow
- Specialist services - white with ocean green (this includes park and ride, university and tourist services)

A slogan, 'Proud to Serve', was also introduced across the group. Another rebranding of the Stagecoach Group's regional bus operations began to take effect during 2024, with buses repainted into a single-colour 'steel blue' livery and the 'Proud to Serve' slogan replaced by 'We've got you'.

During September 2021, it was reported that rival company National Express entered into talks to acquire Stagecoach Group. In December 2021, a deal was agreed between the boards of the two companies: however, it was subject to both shareholder approval and regulatory scrutiny. To satisfy the Competition & Markets Authority, Stagecoach had planned to sell Megabus, its 35% shareholding in Scottish Citylink and the Falcon Coaches part of Stagecoach South West to ComfortDelGro. Having originally recommended shareholders accept the National Express offer, in March 2022 the board of directors withdrew the recommendation in favour of a takeover offer from a DWS managed investment fund. Following this, Stagecoach instead sold Megabus and Falcon Coaches to Scottish Citylink and increased its shareholding in the joint venture to 37.5% in return.

In June 2022, Stagecoach purchased London bus operator Tower Transit's Lea Interchange garage, with Stagecoach London taking on 150 buses and 11 Transport for London bus route contracts; operations from Lea Interchange are managed under the Lea Interchange Bus Company Limited license. Later in August, Stagecoach acquired the London operations of the HCT Group after the company had fallen into administration, with Stagecoach acquiring a further 160 buses, 17 TfL route contracts and two bus garages from the acquisition.

In September 2024, Stagecoach was announced as the winning bidder to operate the Buses.gg brand in Guernsey, taking over 20 public services as well as 24 school bus services and a fleet of 42 buses from existing operator Tower Transit, who themselves took over from the HCT Group. Services on Guernsey commenced from 1 April 2025, with the Buses.gg name and livery retained, two Optare Solo SRs delivered to Guernsey on loan, and funding provision made for the delivery of six new buses, two of these being battery electric buses.

== Operations ==
=== Key people ===
Stagecoach Group plc was listed on the London Stock Exchange. Founder Brian Souter and his sister Ann Gloag were the largest shareholders with a combined 26% shareholding at April 2019.

== UK operating companies ==
The following is a breakdown of the Stagecoach operating divisions. The centre of each operating region is shown in parentheses. Legal company names are listed alongside the trading names for that company.

=== Bus division ===
Bus division operations are as follows:

Stagecoach UK bus divisions
Division	Headquarters	Local brands	Legal name and other notes
Stagecoach Cumbria and Lancashire	Carlisle	The Lakes Connection; Stagecoach in Lancaster; Stagecoach in Preston	Cumberland Motor Services
Stagecoach East	Cambridge	Stagecoach in Bedford; Stagecoach in Cambridge; Stagecoach in Huntingdonshire; Stagecoach in Peterborough	Cambus; Huntingdon & District; Stagecoach in the Fens (Huntingdon) now operates the longest Guided busway in the world with the fleet for the busway running on bio fuel. As of September 2010 Stagecoach in Northants transferred to a new Midland division.
Stagecoach East Midlands	Lincoln	Stagecoach in Worksop; Stagecoach in Mansfield; Stagecoach in Gainsborough; Stagecoach Grimsby-Cleethorpes; Stagecoach in Scunthorpe; Stagecoach in Hull; Stagecoach in Lincolnshire	Lincolnshire Road Car Co; Go West Travel Co; Cleveland Transit
Stagecoach East Scotland	Dunfermline	Rennies Coaches; Stagecoach in Perth; Stagecoach in Fife; Stagecoach Strathtay	Fife Scottish Omnibuses; Strathtay Scottish Omnibuses; Have previously operated the Forth Fast hovercraft service from Kirkcaldy to Portobello.
Stagecoach London	Canning Town	East London; Selkent; Thameside	East London Bus & Coach Co. South East London & Kent Bus Co. Lea Interchange Bus Company; CT Plus (London); Stagecoach purchased the East London and Selkent divisions of London Buses when they were privatised in 1994. They were sold to Macquarie Bank on 31 August 2006 for £263.6m. Macquarie continued to use the Stagecoach brand under licence before rebranding the services as East London and Selkent. Stagecoach reacquried its old London operations from Macquarie Bank in October 2010 for £59.5m and both were once again rebranded as Stagecoach.
Stagecoach Manchester	Cheetham Hill	Stagecoach in Manchester; Bee Network services in Greater Manchester	Greater Manchester Buses (South)
Stagecoach Merseyside and South Lancashire	Liverpool	Stagecoach in Chester; Stagecoach in Wirral; Stagecoach Merseyside; Stagecoach in Lancashire	Ribble Motor Services; Glenvale Transport; First Chester & The Wirral
Stagecoach Midlands	Northampton	Stagecoach in Warwickshire; Stagecoach in Northamptonshire; Goldline	Midland Red (South) (Warwickshire); United Counties Omnibus Company (Northamptonshire)
Stagecoach North East	Sunderland	Stagecoach on Teesside; Stagecoach in Hartlepool; Stagecoach in Newcastle; Stagecoach in South Shields; Stagecoach in Sunderland; Tees Flex	Busways Travel Services; Cleveland Transit
Stagecoach Highlands	Inverness	Stagecoach in Orkney; Stagecoach in Lochaber; Stagecoach in Skye; Stagecoach in Inverness; Stagecoach in Caithness	Highland Country Buses; Orkney Coaches; Rapsons Coaches
Stagecoach Bluebird	Aberdeen	Stagecoach in Aberdeen	Northern Scottish Omnibuses Ltd.
Stagecoach South	Chichester	Stagecoach in Hants & Surrey; Stagecoach in Hampshire; Stagecoach in Portsmouth; Stagecoach in the South Downs	Alder Valley; Fleet Buzz; Hampshire Bus Company; Southdown Motor Services
Stagecoach South East	Canterbury	Stagecoach in East Kent; Stagecoach in East Sussex	East Kent Road Car Company
Stagecoach South Wales	Cwmbran	Stagecoach De Cymru; TrawsCymru	Aberdare Bus Company Ltd; Crosskeys Coach Hire Ltd; Islwyn Borough Transport; Parfitts Motor Services Ltd; Red & White Services; Rhondda Buses Ltd; The Valleys Bus Company Ltd
Stagecoach South West	Exeter	Stagecoach in Devon; Stagecoach in Somerset (defunct); South West Falcon; Buses.gg	Devon General; Bayline Ltd; Cooks Coaches
Stagecoach West	Gloucester	Stagecoach in Cheltenham; Stagecoach in Swindon; Stagecoach in Gloucester; Stagecoach in the Cotswolds; Stagecoach in Oxfordshire; Oxford Tube; Stagecoach in the Wye & Dean	Cheltenham & Gloucester Omnibus Co; Swindon & District Bus Co; South Gloucestershire Bus & Coach; Thames Transit; Midland Red (South) (Banbury)
Stagecoach West Scotland	Ayr	Stagecoach Western; Stagecoach A1 Service; Stagecoach in Glasgow	Western Buses
Stagecoach Yorkshire & Chesterfield	Barnsley	Stagecoach in Yorkshire; Stagecoach in Sheffield; Stagecoach in Chesterfield	Yorkshire Traction Co; Yorkshire Terrier; Andrews (Sheffield)

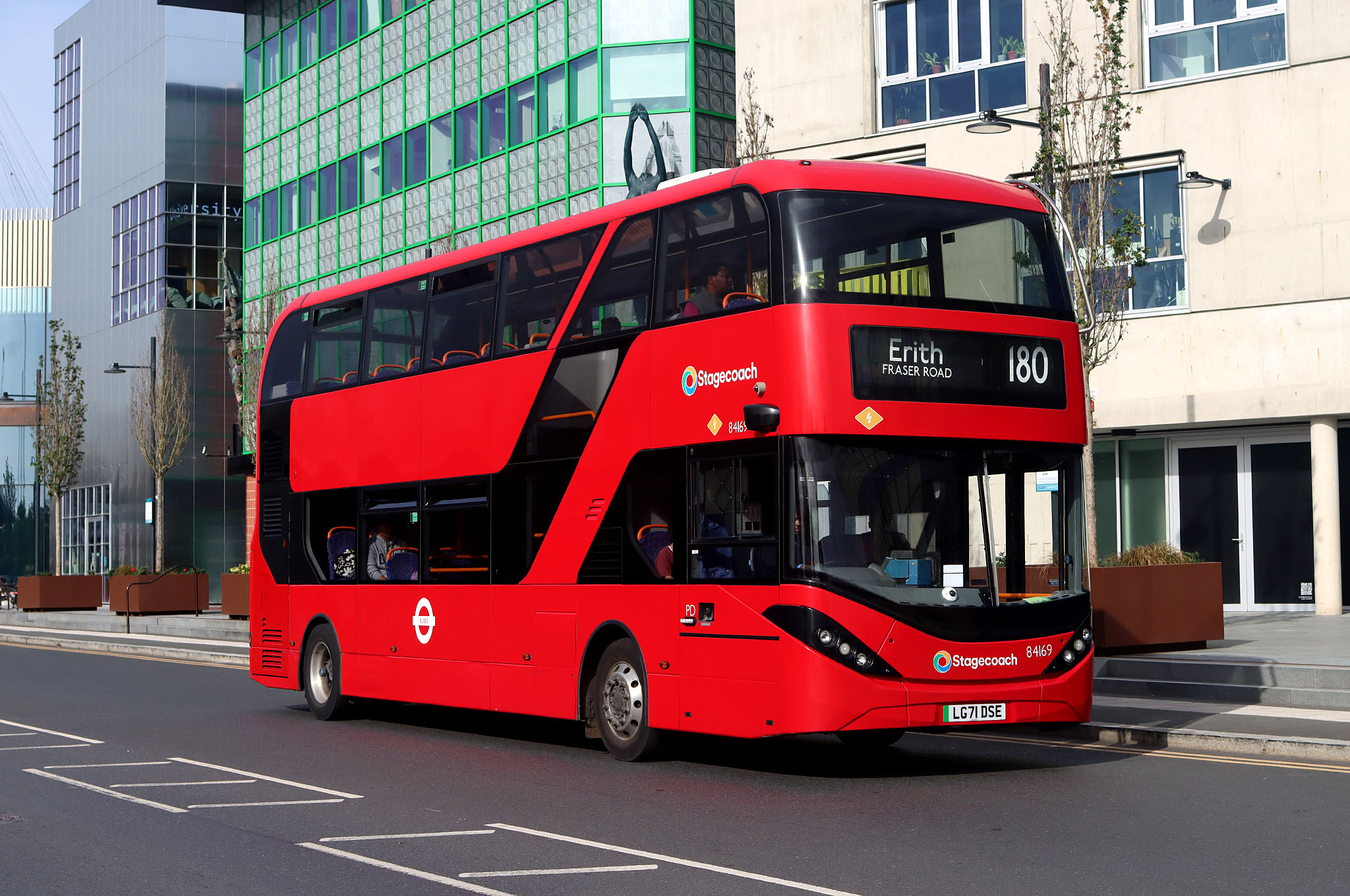
Stagecoach London BYD Enviro400EV in October 2023

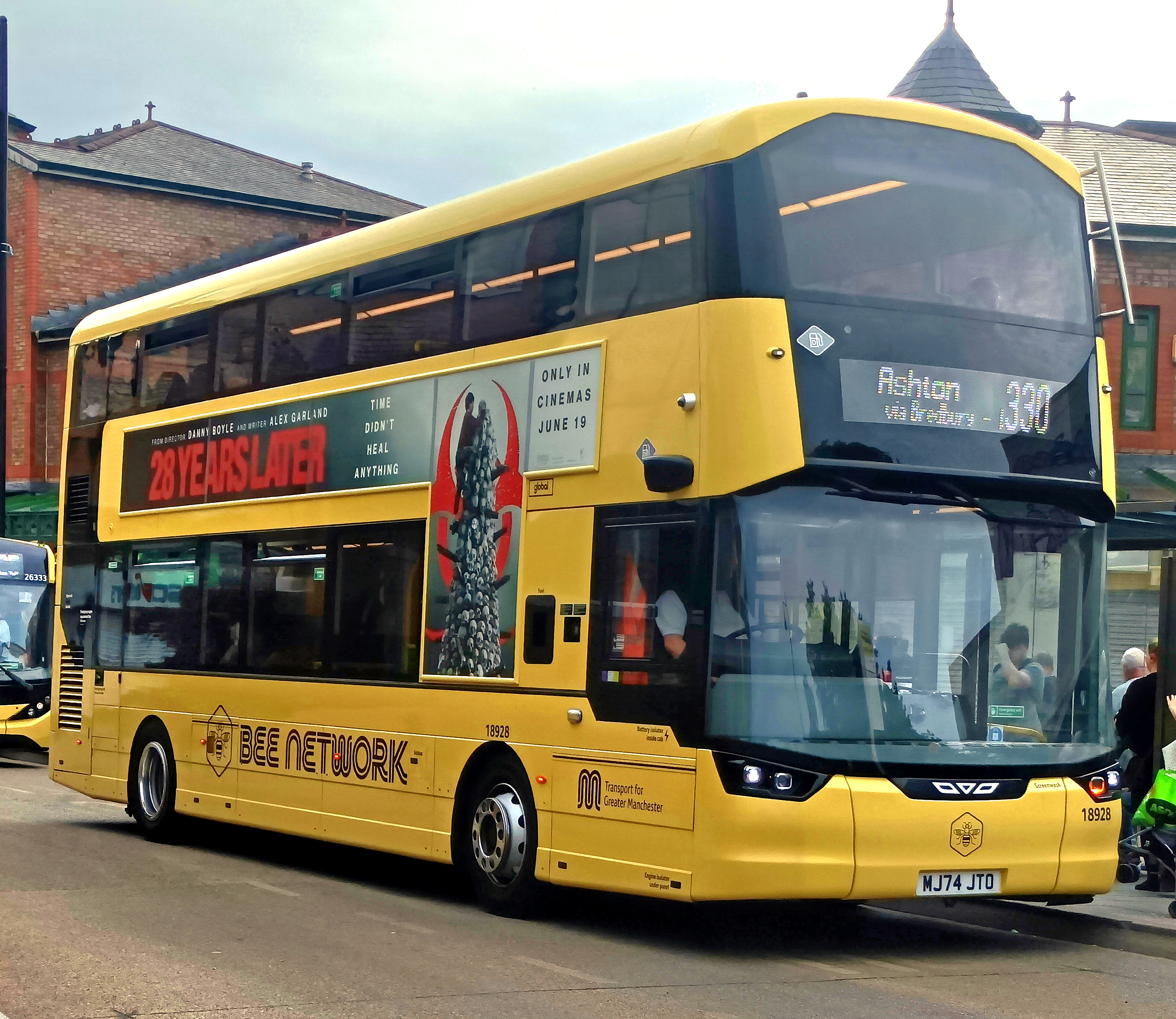
Stagecoach Manchester Wright StreetDeck Ultroliner in June 2025

Stagecoach Merseyside and South Lancashire Alexander Dennis Enviro400 MMC in September 2026

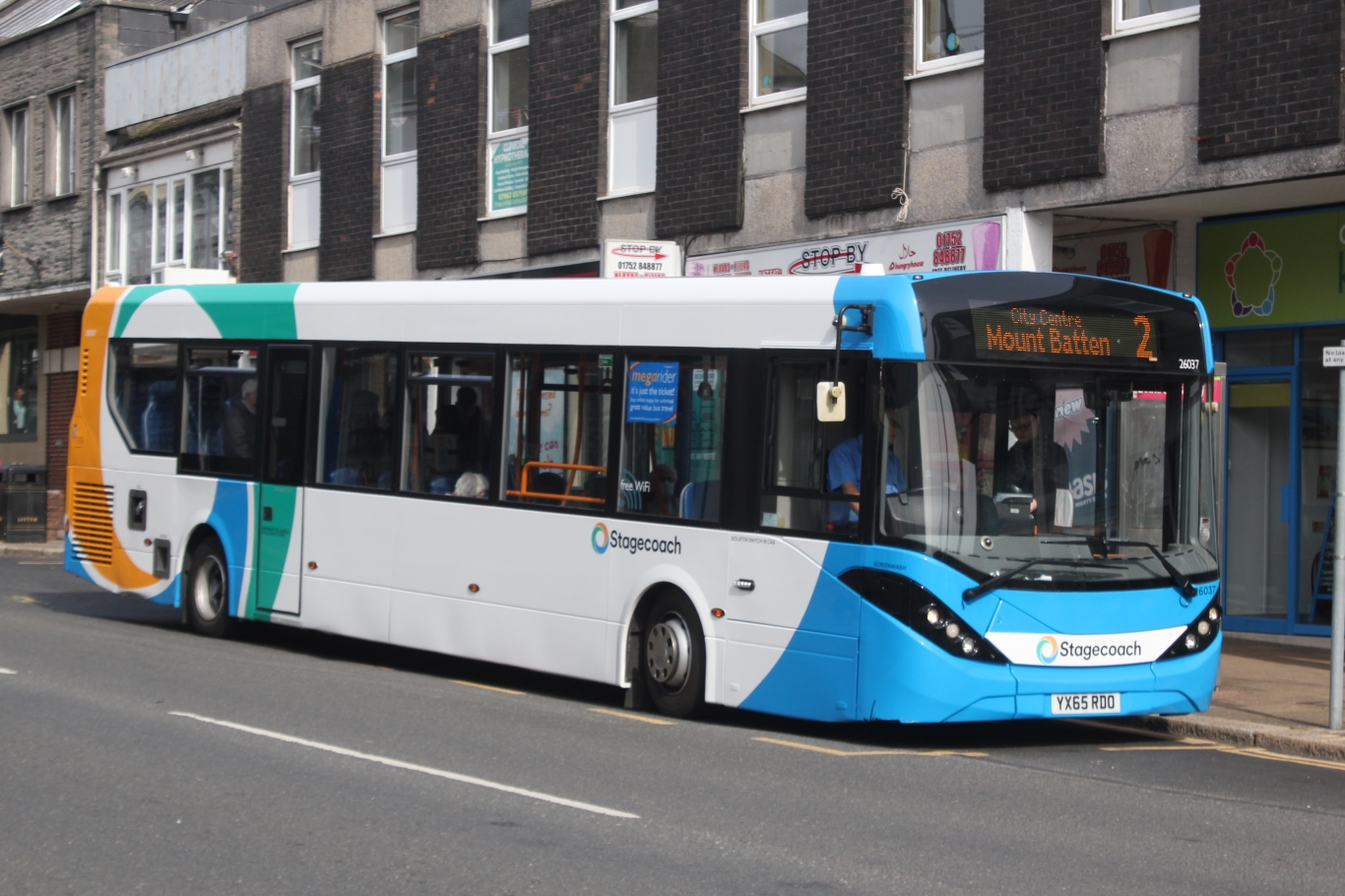
Stagecoach Devon Alexander Dennis Enviro200 MMC in April 2022

==== Brands ====
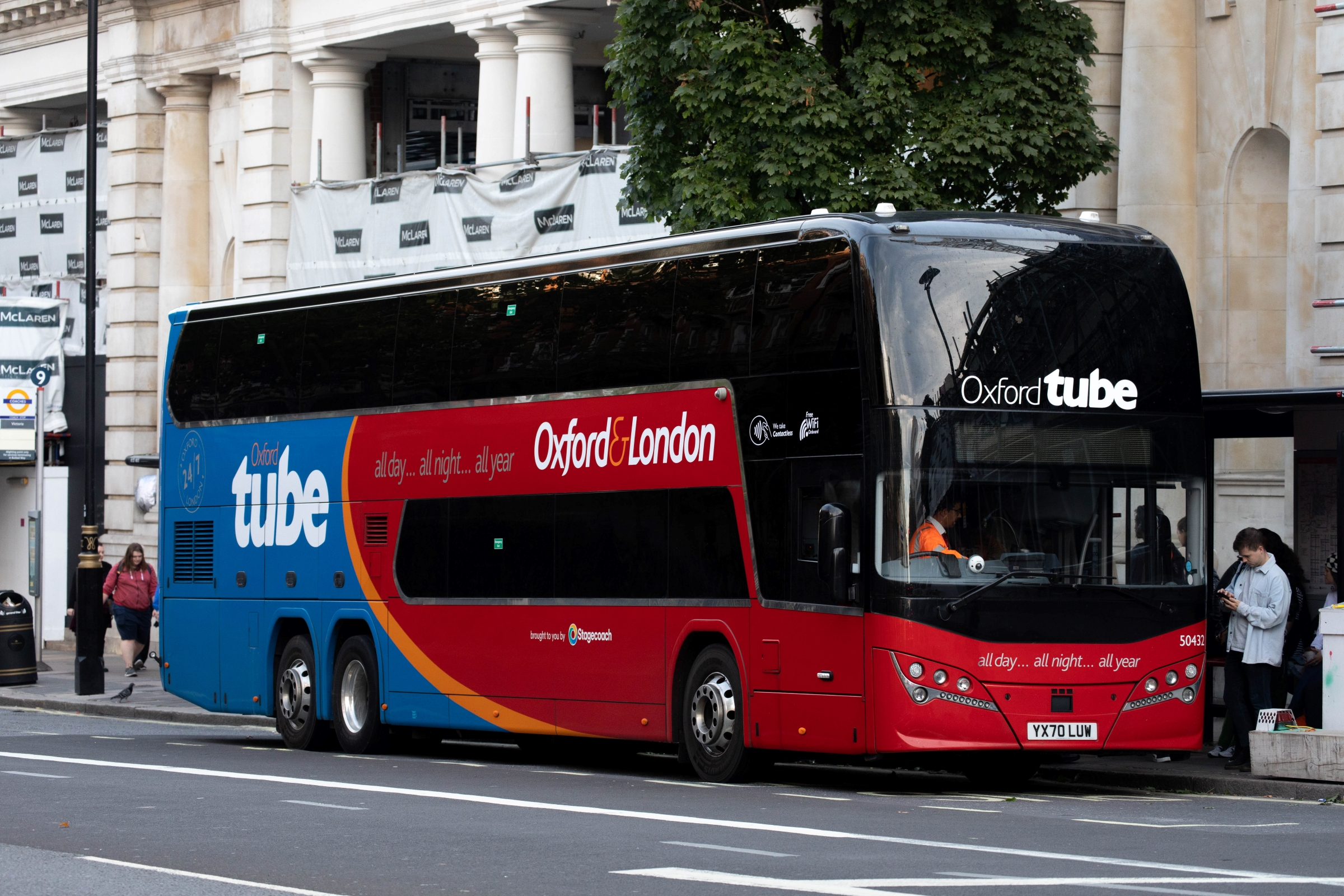
Oxford Tube Plaxton Panorama bodied Volvo B11R at Victoria Coach Station in September 2022

Apart from the ordinary bus operations and no-frills services, the UK bus division has the following brands that extend across operating divisions.

- Stagecoach Express – an express coach service that operates mainly between towns and cities where Stagecoach operate. It tends not to compete with National Express like Megabus, and in some cases tickets are available through the National Express website.
- Oxford Tube – an express coach service offering high frequency 24-hour services to London, operated by Stagecoach West.
- Citi – some urban networks have received Citi branding, such as Cambridge, Exeter & Peterborough; although much of this brand has now been withdrawn.
- Stagecoach Gold – a luxury bus service brand designed to attract middle class travellers to public transport, generally on the most important and high-profile routes within an area served by Stagecoach (e.g. Sheffield to Chesterfield). Gold buses typically feature a special blue and gold colour scheme, leather seats, and on-board Wi-Fi access. Both single-decker and double-decker gold buses are used.
- Stagecoach SimpliBus operates in the East Midlands.

==== Fleet numbers ====
The Stagecoach Group number their buses using a system that applies for the life of the bus or until it is sold, as follows:

- 10000 – 19999: diesel-powered double-decker buses
- 20000 – 29999: diesel-powered single-decker buses
- 30000 – 39999: diesel-powered door-forward midibuses
- 40000 – 49999: diesel & electric-powered minibuses and wheel-forward midibuses
- 50000 – 59999: coaches
- 60000 – 69999: New Routemasters, electric midibuses and other specialised vehicles
- 70000 – 79999: electric single-decker buses
- 80000 – 89999: electric and other alternative fuel double-decker buses
- 90000 – 99999: pool cars, staff transport vehicles, etc.

== Former operations ==
=== East Midlands Trains ===
Stagecoach commenced operating the new East Midlands Trains franchise in November 2007 that took over all of Midland Mainline's and some of Central Trains services. During August 2019, it ceased operating when the franchise was taken over by Abellio East Midlands Railway.

=== Manchester Metrolink ===
In July 2007, Stagecoach took over the operation of Manchester Metrolink on a 10-year fixed-term management contract, beating competition from Keolis, Serco and Transdev, to make it the biggest tram operator in the UK. This system was the first modern tram system in the United Kingdom, opening just before the Sheffield system in 1992. Nearly 18 million people ride on the system a year. Stagecoach sold the Metrolink business to RATP Group in August 2011.

=== Magic Bus ===
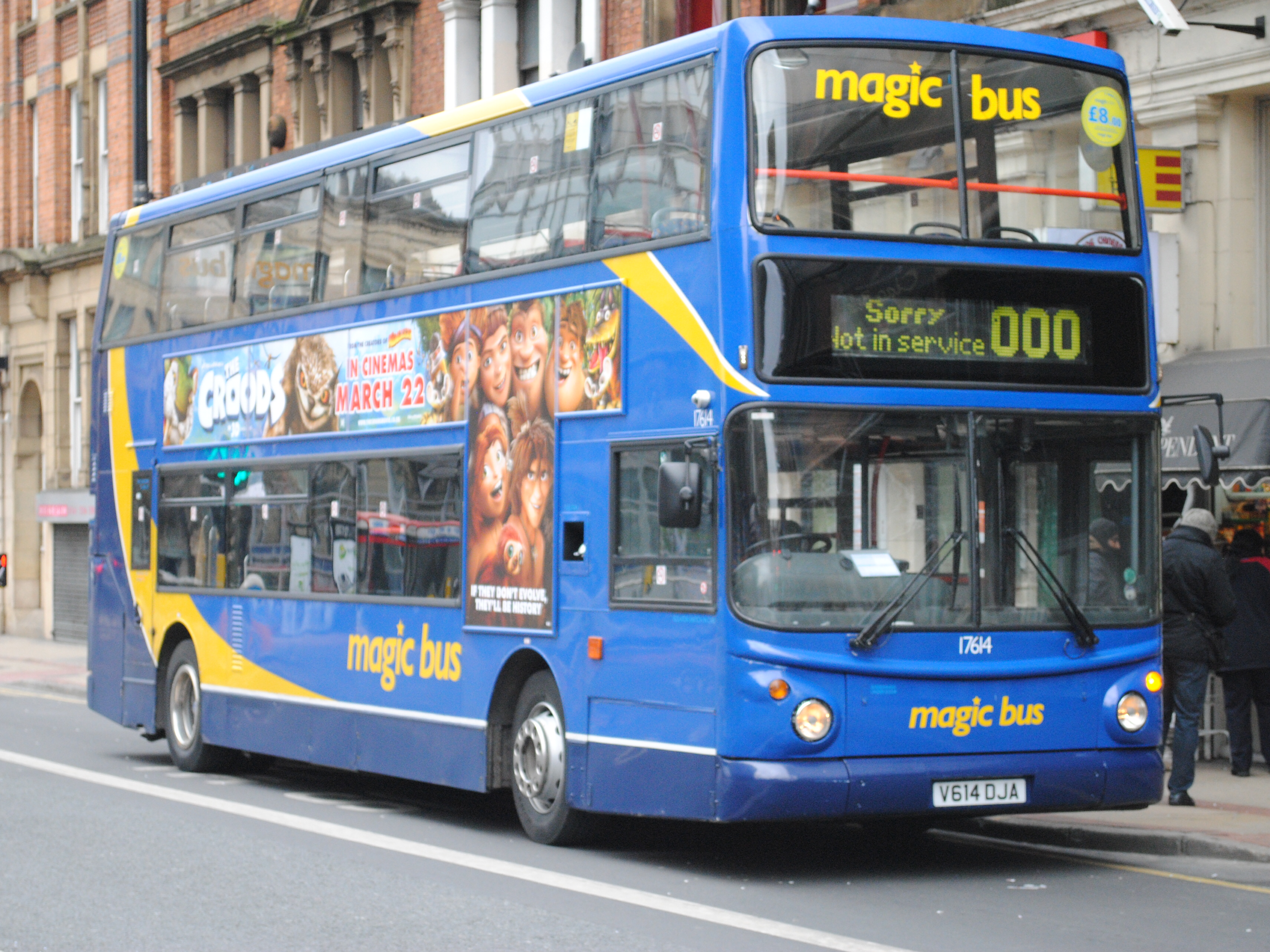
Magic Bus Alexander ALX400 bodied Dennis Trident 2 in Manchester in March 2013

Magic Bus was the first no-frills brand of Stagecoach. It was first used in red lettering on ex London Regional Transport AEC Routemasters, otherwise painted in Stagecoach stripes, in competition in Glasgow. Later, an allover blue with yellow lettering was adopted, on older service buses with simple fares and no travel passes, usually operated on routes with strong competition from other operators, most notably on the Manchester Piccadilly to East Didsbury Wilmslow Road bus corridor route in Manchester, but also in Newcastle upon Tyne and East Scotland (as Magic Mini). In 2008 Stagecoach Merseyside introduced a Magic Bus service competing with themselves and Arriva North West on the busy route 14 corridor, Magic Bus 14C runs every 7/8 minutes between City Centre and Broadway. By 2012, only the Manchester Magic Bus remained, these being upgraded from Volvo Olympians and Dennis Dragons to Alexander ALX400 and East Lancs bodied Dennis Trident 2s. Service ended in 2025.

=== Megabus ===
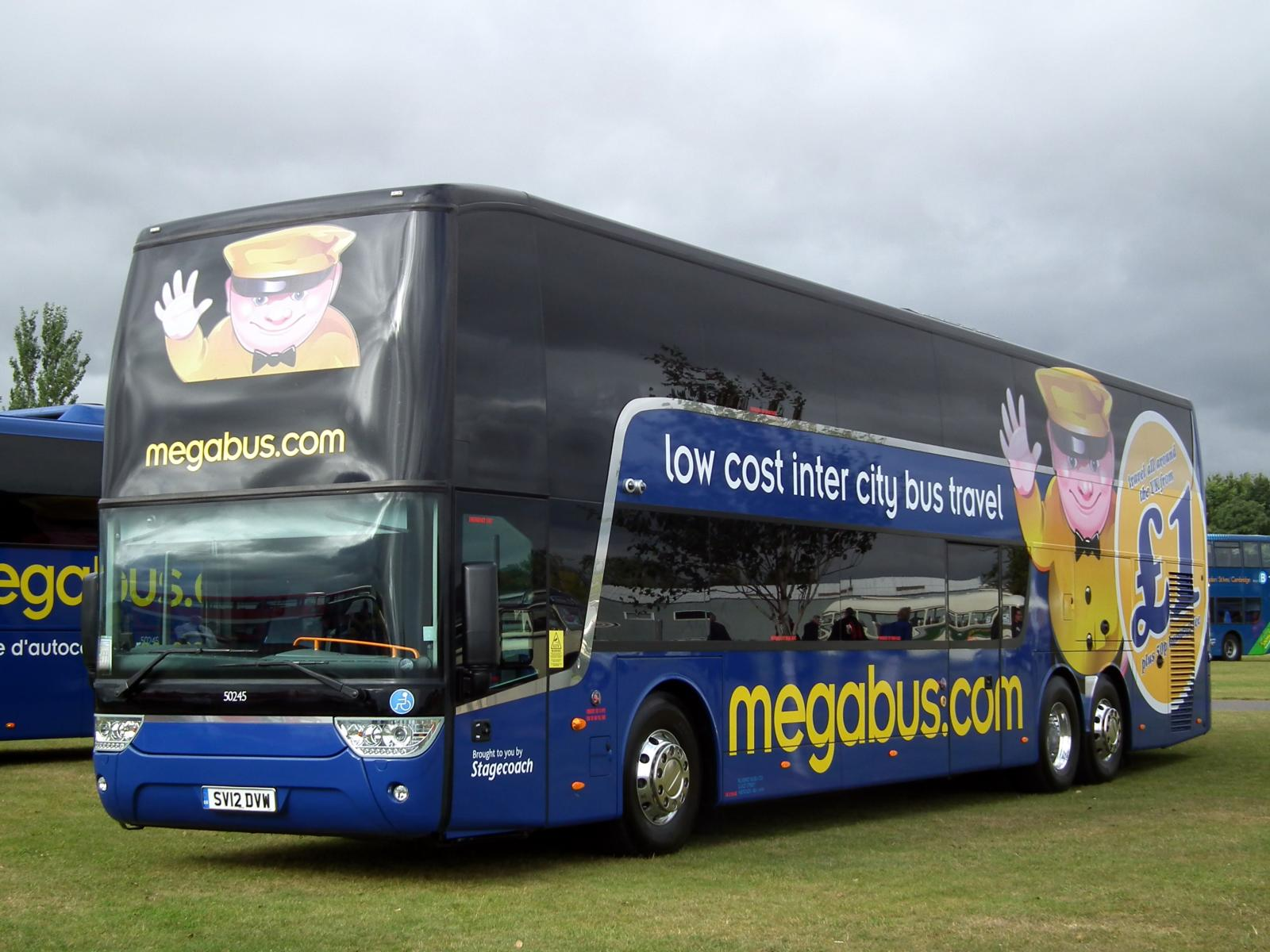
Megabus Van Hool Astromega in September 2012

Megabus was a low cost, "no-frills" intercity coach service launched in the United Kingdom by Stagecoach in 2003. The Megabus network covered most of the island of Great Britain, although some routes offered only one journey per day. Originally operated using high capacity, but older coach-seated vehicles, services were later operated with new modern single or double deck coaches. Most services used on-street bus stops, rather than pay for access to coach stations (except in cases where pre-existing routes were converted to Megabus lines). A notable exception to this was the use of London Victoria Coach Station. Operations ended in 2025.

=== Megatrain ===
On 14 November 2005, the Megabus concept was extended to certain rail services, with the introduction of Megatrain between London and Southampton, and London and Portsmouth, using a dedicated carriage on selected South West Trains services. It was later extended to some Virgin Trains services (since withdrawn) and to selected East Midlands Trains services. In 2009, the Megabusplus concept was introduced, under which certain trips are begun on a train and are then completed on a bus. Unlike the original Megatrain concept, this service was available seven days a week. Service ended in 2017.

=== Sheffield Supertram ===
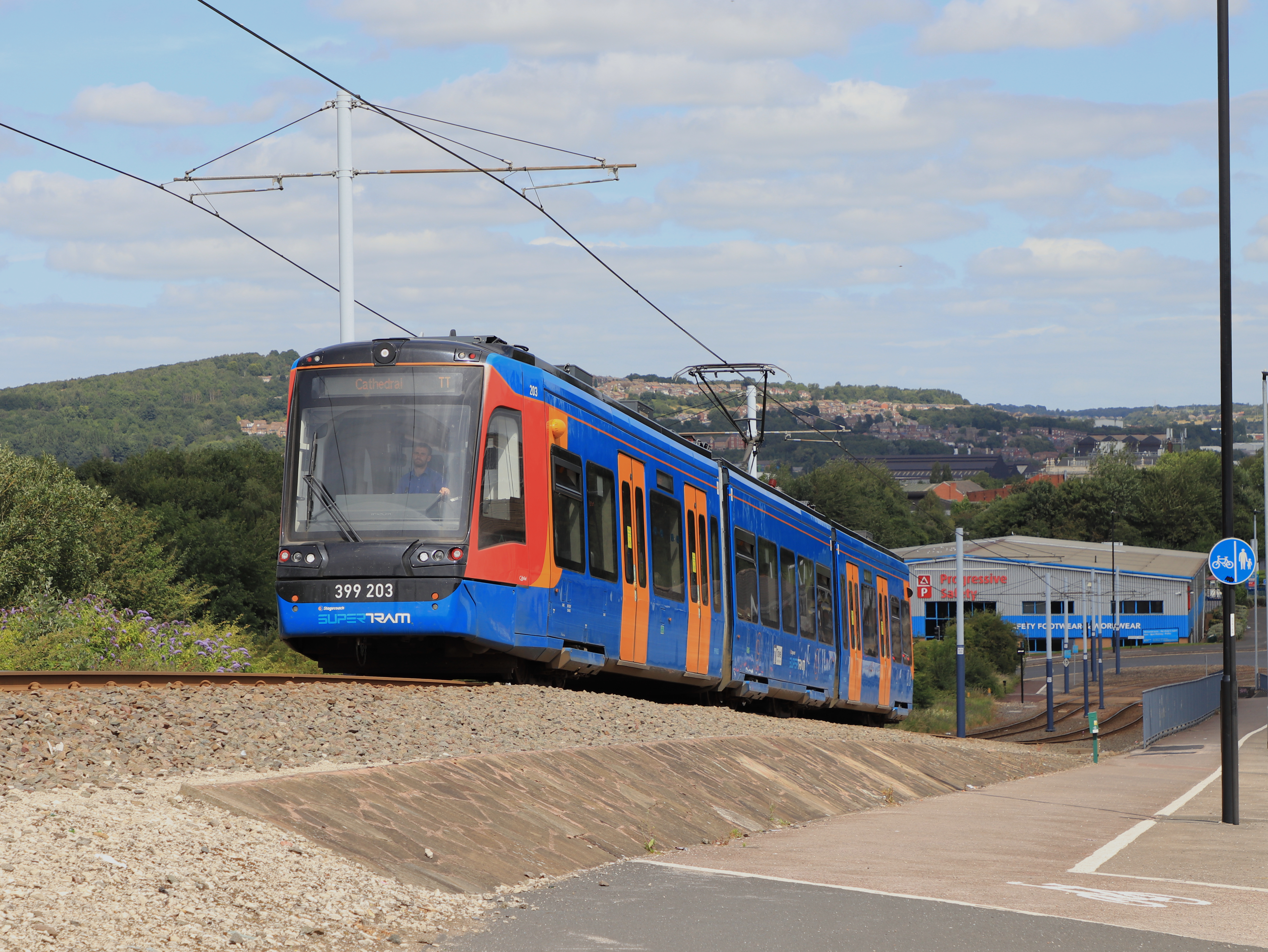
Sheffield Supertram in July 2020

Stagecoach operated the Sheffield Supertram under a concession from the South Yorkshire Passenger Transport Executive between 1997 and 2024. Its average daily ridership is 33,700, equalling more than 12 million per year, well above expectations. At the time of the concession's expiry, there were three light rail transit lines and a later tram-train service to Rotherham. Future plans included schemes to Dore, Fulwood and Maltby; following consultations, a reduced scheme with an extension to Broomhill was being considered as of 2017. The concession expired in March 2024, with the operation of Supertram returning to the public sector.

=== South West Trains ===
Stagecoach ran the South West Trains franchise from February 1996 to August 2017. It retained the franchise for three years from February 2004 and for a further 10 years from February 2007. The franchise passed to First MTR South Western Railway on 20 August 2017

- Island Line Trains – The rail system on the Isle of Wight, was also operated by Stagecoach from October 1996 to August 2017. In February 2007 it was merged into the South Western franchise.

=== Stagecoach Rail ===
In 1992, shortly before the privatisation of British Rail, Stagecoach Rail briefly operated a modest InterCity operation between Aberdeen and London. Two British Railways Mark 2 passenger carriages were re-branded in Stagecoach colours and attached to a scheduled British Rail InterCity sleeper service.

=== Virgin CrossCountry ===
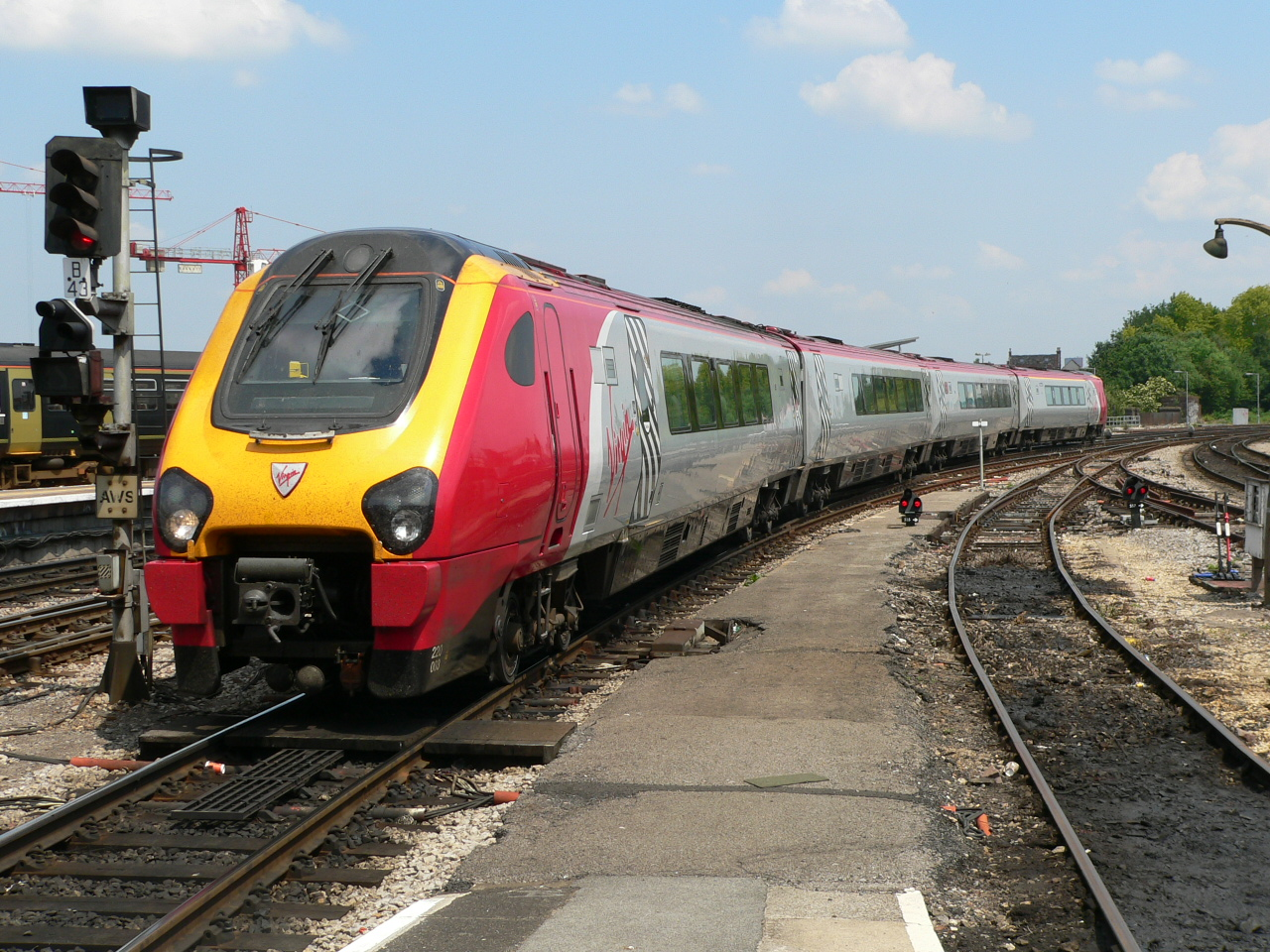
Virgin CrossCountry Class 220 Voyager at Bristol Temple Meads in June 2005

Virgin Rail Group operated the CrossCountry franchise as Virgin CrossCountry from January 1997 until November 2007 when it passed to Arriva.

=== Virgin Trains East Coast ===
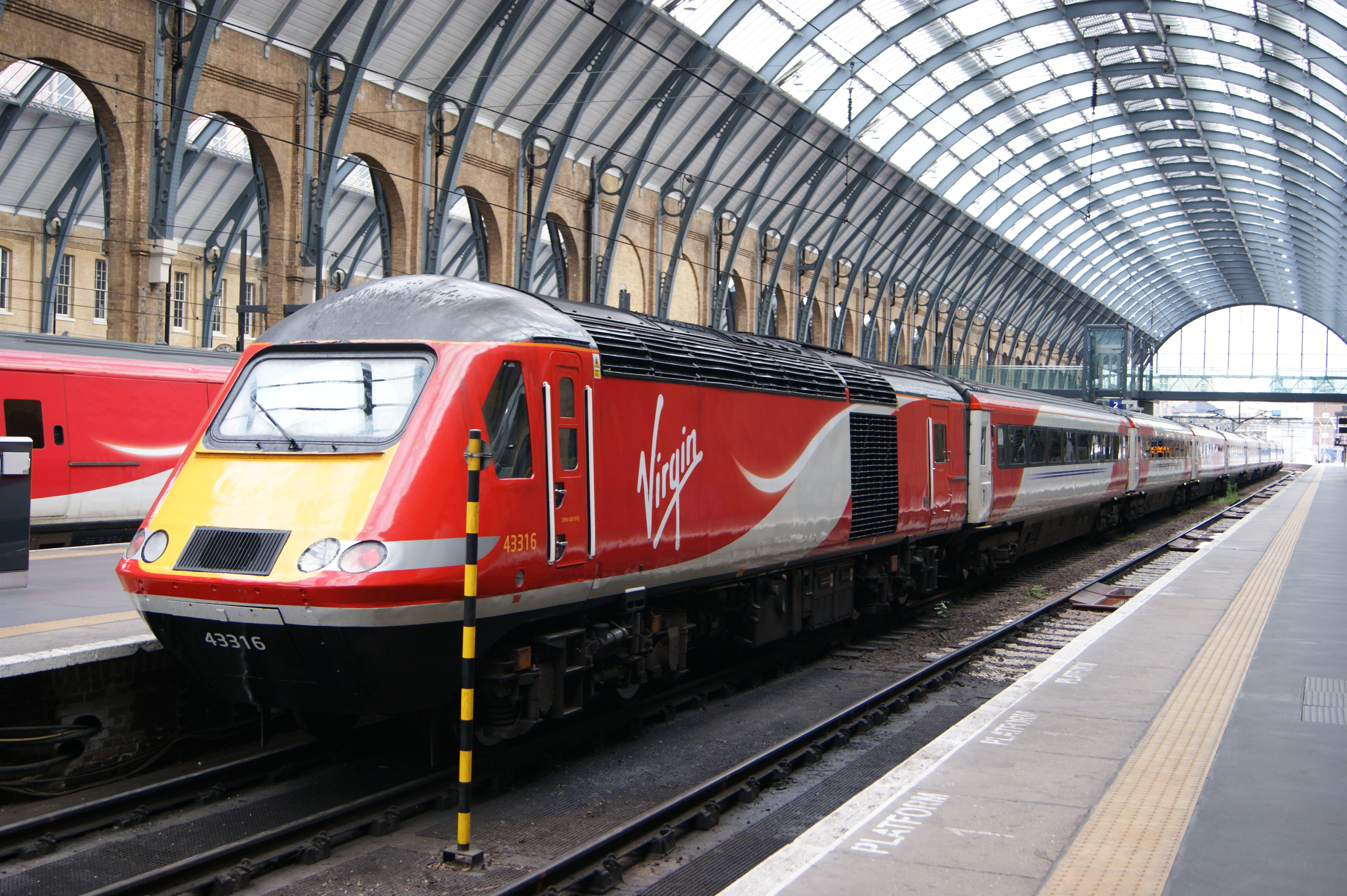
Virgin Trains East Coast Class 43 at King's Cross in September 2015

Virgin Trains East Coast, in which Stagecoach held a 90% shareholding, operated the InterCity East Coast franchise from March 2015 to June 2018.

=== Virgin Trains West Coast ===
The group has held a 49% stake in Virgin Rail Group since October 1998. Virgin Rail Group operated the InterCity West Coast franchise as Virgin Trains West Coast from March 1997 until December 2019.

=== Australia ===
In 1999, Stagecoach purchased the school bus operations of Sunbus in the Cairns, Ipswich and Sunshine Coast regions of Queensland. These were sold in 2002 to:

- Cairns: Love's Bus Service
- Ipswich: Pulitano Group
- Sunshine Coast: Buslink Queensland

=== Hong Kong ===
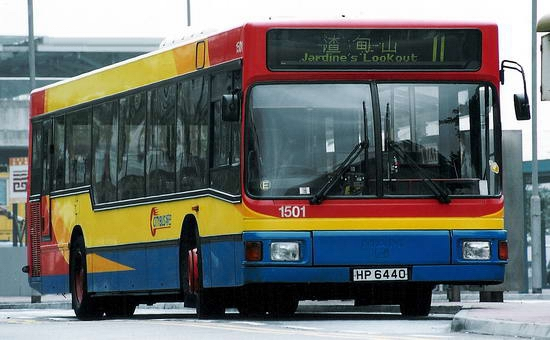
Citybus MAN NL262 in Hong Kong in Stagecoach livery

In 1994, Stagecoach created a subsidiary in Hong Kong which operated residential bus services. It ceased operation in April 1996.

During 1999, Stagecoach planned to become the largest bus company in China through joint ventures, equity stakes and partnerships, and confirmed the £181 million acquisition of Hong Kong's Citybus. Stagecoach acquired control of Citybus Group, which provided franchised bus services on Hong Kong Island and to and from Hong Kong International Airport as well as non-franchised services throughout Hong Kong, in March 1999 and then completed the privatisation of Citybus on 17 July 1999.

In June 2003, the operation was sold to Chow Tai Fook Enterprises, the parent company of the major rival operator New World First Bus.

=== Kenya ===
In November 1991, Stagecoach Holdings (as it was named then), bought United Transport's shareholding in Kenya Bus Services. During its tenure, Stagecoach rapidly expanded the fleet, introducing the Express Services and the modern double decker buses back on Kenyan roads. During October 1998 a consortium of investors led by Karanja Kabage as chairman acquired Kenya Bus Services from Stagecoach Holdings which owned 95% of the business.

=== New Zealand ===
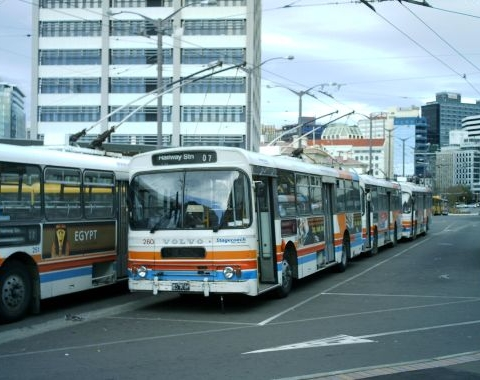
Stagecoach New Zealand Hawke bodied Volvo B58 trolleybus in Wellington

Stagecoach New Zealand was a wholly owned part of the Stagecoach Group, which provided bus services in Auckland, Wellington and the Hutt Valley and nine ferry routes in Auckland. It was the largest bus company in New Zealand when sold. Stagecoach NZ started operations when the firm acquired Wellington City Transport, including the Hutt Valley suburban bus operations of the New Zealand Railways Road Services, branded CityLine, in the 1990s. Following this initial acquisition Stagecoach also purchased Eastbourne Buses, The Yellow Bus Company in Auckland and a controlling interest in Fullers Auckland. In November 2005, the business was sold to Infratil and rebranded as NZ Bus.

=== North America ===
Stagecoach carried out bus operations in the northeastern and midwestern United States and in eastern Canada. Businesses were focused on commuter services, and included tour and charter, sightseeing, local, and school bus operations:

- Coach USA – operating primarily in the northeastern United States providing subsidised transit services (primarily in Greater New York), sightseeing, and charter services, and in the midwestern United States with primarily charter and sightseeing services. Yellow school bus services are also provided by Coach USA in the state of Wisconsin.
- Megabus – discount express bus services radiating from Chicago and New York City. Like Megabus in the United Kingdom, most stops are made at street locations.
- Coach Canada – serving primarily Ontario and Quebec, where it operates interurban and chartered bus services, contract bus services in Durham, yellow school bus service in Durham Region and Peterborough County in Ontario, and sightseeing services in Montreal.

In December 2018, Stagecoach announced it had agreed to sell all of its North American operations to Variant Equity Advisors with the deal concluded in April 2019.

=== Portugal ===
Stagecoach Portugal had its origins in the re-privatisation of Portuguese bus and coach operation, which had been nationalised after the 1974 Revolution. In 1990, the nationalised Rodoviária Nacional was split into ten components. In the capital, Lisbon, Rodoviária de Lisboa was the chief operator outside the city itself, where Carris provided city bus and tram services. The name of Rodoviária de Lisboa survived as part of the Barraqueiro bus company, but another part, serving the area to the west of Lisbon, became Stagecoach Portugal in 1995. A further portion still operates as Vimeca – Viação Mecânica de Carnaxide. During June 2001, Stagecoach announced the sale of their Portuguese operations to ScottURB for £14 million.

=== Nordic countries ===
In October 1996, during Stagecoach's international buying spree, it acquired Swebus AB, the bus-company arm of the Swedish State Railways (SJ), for 1.2 billion kronor ($164 million), which also included operations in Denmark, Finland and Norway. In spring of 1997, Swebus Express was started as an intercity coach service between several cities in southern parts of Sweden, sporting the Stagecoach livery of the time. On 27 October 1999, Stagecoach revealed that it was going to sell Swebus to Concordia Bus for £100 million, to refocus its bus operation on the United States and Asia.

== Scottish Citylink ==
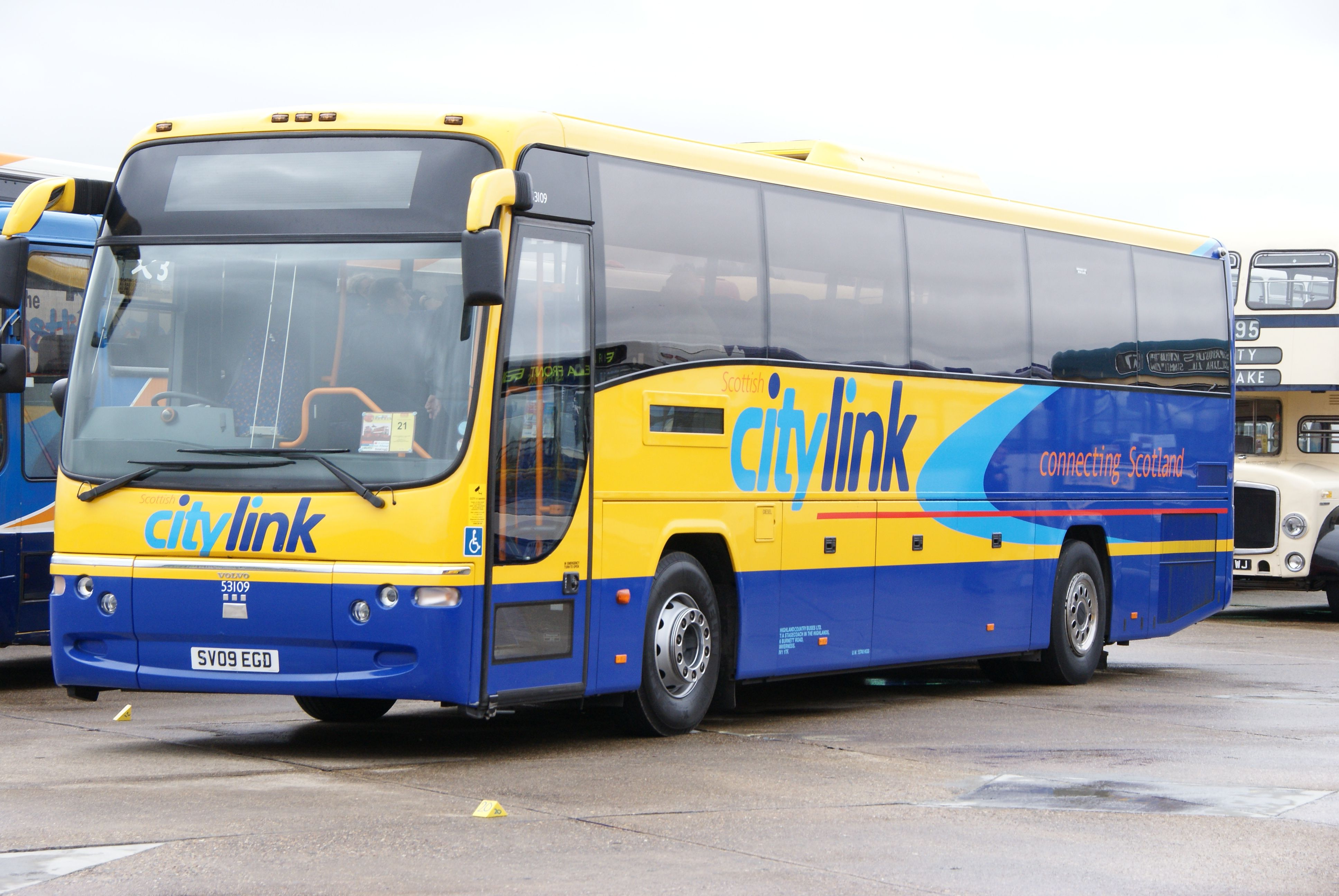
Plaxton Panther bodied Volvo B12B in September 2010

In September 2005, Stagecoach and ComfortDelGro announced a joint venture in the provision of express coach services in Scotland, ending intense competition between ComfortDelGro's subsidiary Scottish Citylink and Stagecoach subsidiaries Megabus and Motorvator. Under the terms of the joint venture, the Stagecoach Group acquires a 35% stake in Scottish Citylink Coaches Ltd, with Citylink assuming certain rights to the Megabus and Motorvator brands in Scotland.

The Competition Commission ruled in October 2006 that the joint venture substantially reduced competition and that evidence suggested some routes were already experiencing higher fares as a result. Though no firm conclusion was drawn, regulators are to consult the two companies about what they need to do to comply with competition regulations and they have indicated that this will likely lead to the forced divestment of some services to an independent operator. The ruling was criticised by Stagecoach as leaving vital services in limbo and jeopardising Scotland's intercity coach network, making it unable to compete effectively with rail and private car journeys.

To satisfy the commission, some Citylink routes were sold to Parks Motor Group in early 2008.

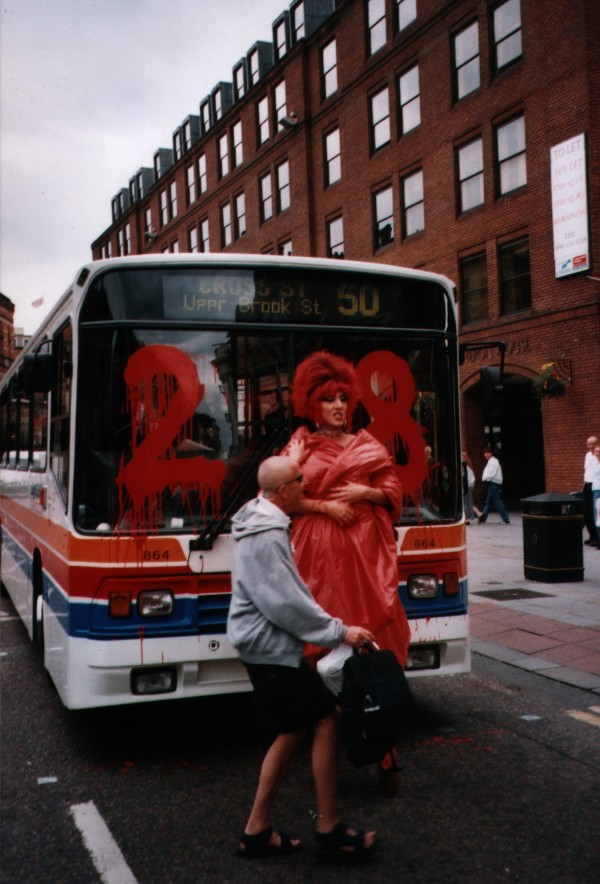
Section 28 protestor in Manchester in July 2000

== Guided Busway ==
Stagecoach operate buses along the Cambridgeshire Guided Busway. The guide wheels on the side of the buses, combined with a specially built track, mean that hands-free driving is possible. The main advantages of a guided busway, versus a normal road, are higher speeds (meaning increased capacity) and increased safety as traffic of differing directions is physically separated.

== See also ==
- Bus transport in the United Kingdom
