= Bus Back Better =

British public transport strategy

Bus Back Better is a strategy published by the United |Kingdom's Department for Transport and transport minister Grant Shapps that covered the government's plans for buses in England outside of London. Initially consisting of £3 billion of funding, leaked documents suggest that the strategy has been scaled back to only have £1.4 billion of funding.

== History ==
In February 2020, the government pledged £3 billion of funding for buses.

The Bus Back Better document was published on 15 March 2021 and contains a spending plan for the previously announced £3 billion of funding. It included promises to purchase 4,000 British-built electric or hydrogen buses, integrated ticketing, fare caps, and new bus lanes.

In February 2021, a letter was leaked indicating that the budget had been cut from £3 billion to £1.4 billion.
