= Albion Nimbus =

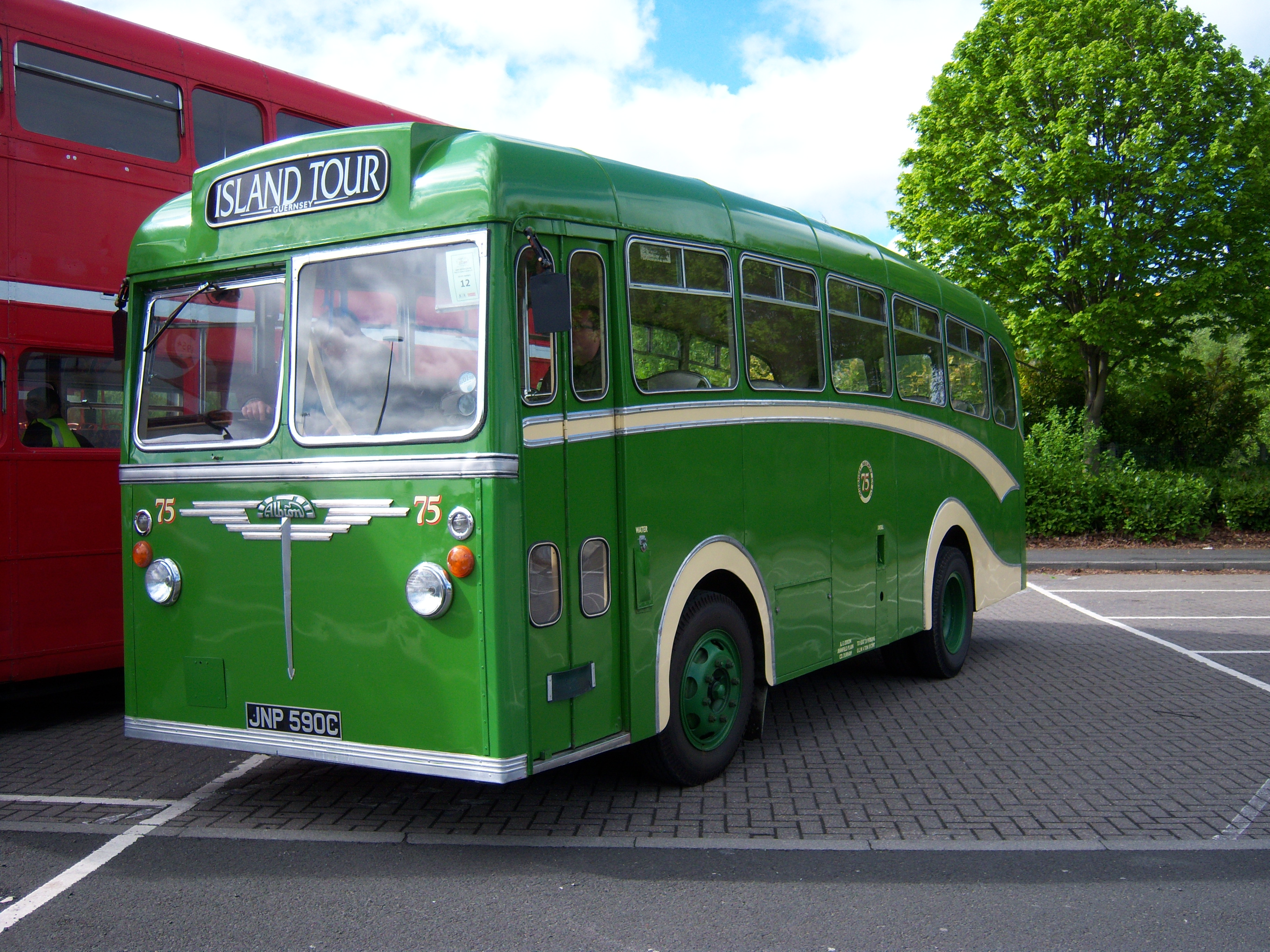

Overview
- Manufacturer: Albion Motors
- Production: 1955–1965

Body and chassis
- Doors: 1-2
- Floor type: Step entrance

Powertrain
- Engine: Albion EN219 diesel engine Albion EN250 diesel engine, 60-72 bhp
- Transmission: Albion 4-speed synchromesh (MR9N); David Brown 4-speed constant mesh (NS3N); Albion 5 or 6-speed constant-mesh (NS3AN)

Dimensions
- Length: 23 ft (7.0 m) for 29 to 36 seats

The Albion Nimbus was an underfloor-engined, ultra-lightweight (dry weight 2.4 tonne) midibus or coach chassis, with a four-cylinder horizontal diesel engine and a gross vehicle weight of six tons. It was largely operated on light rural bus duties and private hires. Operators who used it on heavy-duty bus routes found it insufficiently robust. It was the first Albion bus chassis to have a name that did not begin with the letter V. The design was revised twice and was produced from 1955 to 1965.

== Background ==
Albion Motors had been taken over by Leyland Motors in 1951: after the merger, Albion were to concentrate on export models and lightweight chassis for the home market. With this in mind, Albion developed the EN219 engine, a horizontal four-cylinder unit sharing design and components with the six-cylinder Leyland O350. It was launched in 1953 for the underfloor-engined Albion Claymore delivery truck. During 1954, Scottish Omnibuses (SOL) used Claymore units in an integrally constructed rubber-suspended 32-seater bus, this being announced in May 1955 with the Nimbus being unveiled, in the autumn, at the 1955 Scottish Motor Show at Kelvin Hall, Glasgow. The vehicle on the show stand had an Alexander body and was an Albion demonstrator in SOL livery, whilst the bus in the demonstration park in Highland Omnibuses livery carried a body by SOL, now preserved.

== Description ==
The Nimbus had a bolted lightweight steel frame with channel section longitudinals and tubular cross-members, similar to the Claymore, also featuring a down-sloping front section. During its production life, component changes followed those of the Claymore.

=== MR9N ===
The frame was slightly wider than that of the longest MR7L Claymore but the wheelbase was identical and the radiator was mounted in an inclined position above the front axle, to obviate intrusion into the passenger gangway. Wider and longer springs were fitted and the axles were of wider tack, suitable for 8 ft (2.4 m) wide bodies. Like the MR 5 and 7 Claymore the 3.83-litre EN219 developing 60 bhp (45 kW) at 2200 rpm drove through an Albion single-plate hydraulically assisted clutch and Albion four-speed constant-mesh gearbox, with synchromesh on third and top, to an Albion overhead worm rear axle, the Nimbus rear axle was heavier-duty than that of the heaviest Claymore and had larger brakes. Braking was provided by two-leading-shoe drum brakes all round, hydraulically actuated with vacuum assistance from an Albion-patented engine bypass valve. The engine had an oil-bath air-cleaner and a centrifugal oil filter. Automatic chassis lubrication was standard.

=== NS3N ===
In 1958, the Claymore range was revised with a lower specification and greater use of bought-in components in an attempt to reduce costs and thus it was hoped make the line profitable. Nomenclature was now based on model name, the Claymores becoming models CL5N and CL3N or L and the Nimbus model NS3N. Axles were now of Austin (under British Motor Corporation) design, from their 5-ton truck, the rear axle being of spiral-bevel form and a David Brown four-speed constant mesh gearbox was fitted. There was not a wide version of the BMC axles, so the NS3 had a width over tyres of 7 ft 1 in (2,160 mm), rather than the MR9s 7 ft 7 in (2,310 mm). The engine was the enlarged Albion EN250, a 4.1-litre unit developing 72 bhp (54 kW) at 2,200 rpm.

=== NS3AN ===
In 1960, along with the rest of the Claymore range, the Nimbus was uprated, featuring heavier BMC axles and an Albion constant mesh gearbox with either five or six speeds. Vacuum assistance to the brakes was now provided by a Hydrovac system, belt-driven from the engine. Two Nimbus-specific changes were the option of a drop-frame extension at the rear for a luggage boot and the option of a spare wheel mounted on a slide-out carrier, below this extension.

== Sales ==
In Scotland, SBG fleets Alexander (five MR9 and ten NS3 coaches) and Highland (six MR9 coaches) were the largest purchasers new. The BET group were the major purchasers in England and Wales. Devon General had nine, Maidstone & District fifteen, and Western Welsh purchased 48. The municipal purchasers of the type were Wallesey (4) Southampton (3) Great Yarmouth (6) and Halifax (10) Independents bought buses and coaches, bus customers included W Gash & Sons of Newark, Notts, LCW Motors of Llandeillo, North Wales and the Londonderry and Lough Swilly Railway, operating between Northern Ireland and the north-western parts of the Irish Republic. Smiths of Wigan and Dickson of Dundee were among the purchasers of Nimbus coaches, these were generally bodied by Plaxton, to either front or centre-entrance layout. On Guernsey the linked Guernsey Motors and Guernsey Railways concerns took 32 between them and independent Watson's Greys also owned one, these all had narrow bus bodies by Reading of Portsmouth.

Coachwork on UK/Channel Island examples, was by Alexanders, Harrington, Plaxton, Reading, SOL, Strachans, Weymann and Willowbrook.

One major export market for the type was Australia, and one independent operator there stretched its examples to 27 ft (8.5 m) before fitting them both with 39-seat bus bodies, although the greatest seating capacity for any Nimbus was a standard-length 41-seat school bus for Dunbartonshire County Education Department.

== Operation ==
In contrast with the EN286 through to EN335 series, which were developed for around a decade before release and subject to continual improvement thereafter, the EN218/9 was a rush job, going from concept to production in little over two years. Adams and Milligan quote gasket failures as a particular early problem, comparing the Leyland-inspired use of four securing studs per cylinder rather than the six Albion had used hitherto. They say the Claymore and in particular the Nimbus garnered a reputation for unreliability resulting in uneconomic volumes being sold: that must have applied especially to the 30cwt payload MLH3 Cairn derivative of the Claymore which was barely in production for a year before being dropped.

Of course the underfloor-engined concept had advantages in small delivery trucks. Guy had its Seal and Dennis its Stork around the same time but they sold even worse than the Claymore; although Atkinson had a reliable UFE truck, as did Büssing in West Germany.

It's undeniable though that the idea of a small OMO bus with the amenity of a full size UFE single deck was appealing to certain customers. Notably Scottish Bus Group who used Claymore units and Metalastic rubber suspension in an integral prototype built by Scottish Omnibuses in 1954. It was in the demonstration park of the 1955 Kelvin Hall show that the Nimbus was unveiled and Buses Illustrated's Scottish Columnist wondered why a firm whose motto was "Sure as the Sunrise" had named a vehicle after a raincloud, going on to say that given its emission of black smoke on starting that perhaps it was a cumulo-nimbus.

Geoffrey Hillditch spends a quarter of his chapter on Albion buses detailing the Nimbus and his mostly negative experience of it. His first sight of it was at the 1956 Earls Court show, he had served his time at LNER's Gorton Loco works so he was incredulous at the flimsiness of the frame with a chassis weighing only 2 ton 17.25cwt, but he says "I recognised the logic behind the inception of the design."

One of the first problems he encountered with the Great Yarmouth MR9s was, that in order for the automatic bypass vacuum generator to provide sufficient vacuum for braking assistance idling speed had to be kept low, this resulted in an engine straining at its mountings. Eventually failure of the mountings happened on one of them but not before another managed to shed its dynamo whilst in service, others had sheared a number of chassis brackets. He also found the gearchange linkage (although it kept the engine in place when the mountings failed) developed far too much free play and in order to select reverse on one he had to open the half-door on the passenger side of the cab. Others managed to grind to a halt when two gears were selected simultaneously.

He ordered the short-tailed AEC Reliances to replace them. Then he returned to Halifax as GM and chief engineer to be greeted by ten NS3ANs. First came gasket failures, and in some cases he found part of the block burned away too, which he ascribed to incorrect combustion chamber design. BMC rear axle design was faulty, with half shafts cutting into sealing rings and starving the differential of oil. The automatic lubrication equipment, driven by an extension of the speedometer cable, frequently failed and failure of chassis brackets (as in the MR9s) was common. The use of a conventional engine driven vacuum-exhauster was given as a good point but the six-speed gearbox was in this implementation imprecise in operation.

Whilst praising Albion's service engineers and finding the MR9s good for 11 mpg_{‑imp} (26 L/100 km; 9.2 mpg_{‑US}) on the Norfolk coast and the six-speed NS3ANs returned 12 mpg_{‑imp} (24 L/100 km; 10.0 mpg_{‑US})-13 mpg_{‑imp} (22 L/100 km; 11 mpg_{‑US}) "and could do even better on a route where the overdrive could be engaged for reasonable periods" his conclusion was "[N]ippy and economical though a heavy town centre route was no place for a Nimbus."

Nimbus production amounted to 124 MR9 and 217 NS3. The largest user was Western Welsh, who kept them to deeply rural routes. In contrast 471 Albion Aberdonians were built over a shorter period.

Although operators using the Nimbus on intensive one-man-operated routes found it troublesome, on the lightly trafficked rural routes for which it was designed it could put in a long life. Harvey of Mousehole, Cornwall operated an ex-Halifax bus from 1966 to 1986, while other rural operators who got good value out of second-hand Nimbuses were Wiles of Port Seton in East Lothian, Scotland, and Booth and Fisher who operated on the borderlands of Yorkshire and Nottinghamshire.

== Preservation ==
One MR9L and 21 NS3N/NS3AN Nimbuses are preserved. The body from one of the Western Welsh examples was removed by the operator and refitted to the prototype Bristol LHS6L chassis which was registered XBO1F and is now preserved with Thornes Independent of Selby, Yorks.

== Derivatives ==
Bristol Commercial Vehicles built the SU model from 1960 to 1966, this featured the same EN250 engine and BMC rear-axle as the Nimbus NS3AN with a David Brown overdrive-top five-speed constant-mesh gearbox, all were bodied by Eastern Coach Works, most to 25 ft (8m) length, seating 36 (buses) or 33 (coaches) although a shorter-wheelbase 30-seat model 23 ft (7.0 m) long was also built. The major difference from the Nimbus was that the radiator was mounted at the extreme front of the chassis. It was concentrated in the south-west of England, the customers for the 179 built were eight Transport Holding Company fleets. Southern and Western National had 97 (36 of which were coaches, out of 38 coaches built). Bristol Omnibus Company had nine short buses. West Yorkshire Road Car had 18 longer buses, United Automobile Services five, United Counties Omnibus Company had six and United Welsh Services had the other two coaches. At least three Bristol SU survive, one each from Western National and Bristol, and the last West Yorkshire example, EWT386C which was re-engined with a Perkins H6-354 engine as part of the Bristol LH development programme. Thornes Independent also preserve this bus as part of their heritage fleet.

== See also ==
- List of buses

== Sources ==
=== Manufacturer's brochures ===
- Albion Motors Brochure 2001, November 1955
- Albion Motors Brochure L688, September 1958
- Albion Motors Brochure L716, September 1960

=== Books ===
- Kaye, Buses and Trolleybuses since 1945, London 1968
- Adams & Milligan Albion of Scotstoun, Paisley 1999
- Hillditich, A Further Look At Buses, Shepperton 1981
- Jack, Leyland Bus Mark Two, Glossop 1982

=== Magazines ===
- Smith (ed) Buses Illustrated 26, Shepperton, December 1955
- Booth (ed) Classic Bus 30, Edinburgh, July 1997

=== Websites ===
- http://www.buslistsontheweb.co.uk
- https://web.archive.org/web/20130715182127/http://classsicbusmag.co.uk/
- http://aec.middx.net
