= Bristol SU =

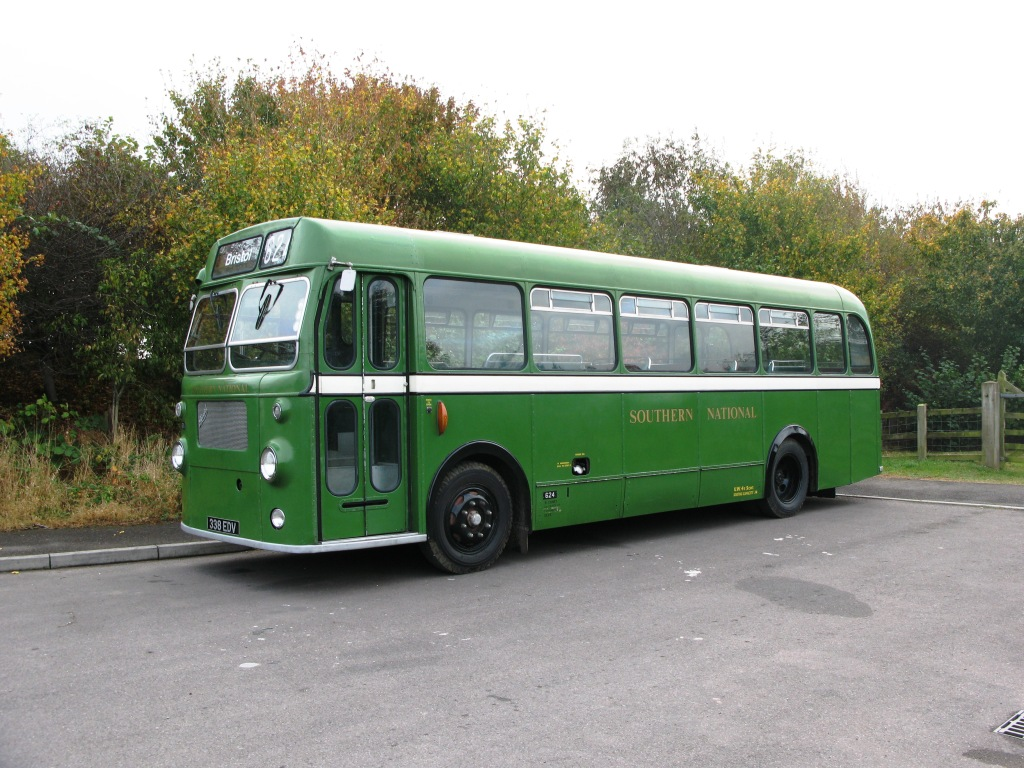

Overview
- Manufacturer: Bristol Commercial Vehicles; Eastern Coach Works (ECW)
- Production: 1960–1966

Body and chassis
- Class: Bus chassis Coach chassis
- Body style: Single-decker bus Single-decker coach
- Doors: 1
- Floor type: Step deck

Dimensions
- Length: 9.0m to 12.0m
- Width: 2.55m
- Height: 3.4m

The Bristol SU was a single-decker bus and single-decker coach chassis built by Bristol Commercial Vehicles between 1960 and 1966. The bodies for these vehicles were built by Eastern Coach Works (ECW). Some of them were built as medium length chassis, whereas most of them were built as full length chassis.

== Design ==
The Bristol SU ("small, underfloor-engined") chassis featured the same Albion EN250 engine and BMC rear axle as the Albion Nimbus NS3AN with a David Brown overdrive-top five-speed constant-mesh gearbox and a front axle by Kirkstall. The major difference from the Nimbus was that the radiator was mounted at the extreme front of the chassis. EWT 386C (West Yorkshire's SMA17) was later rebuilt with a Perkins H6.354 5.8-litre engine to test its design for use in the Bristol LH, which superseded the SU as Bristol's lightweight chassis.

The single-decker ECW body was just 7 feet 6 inches (2.29 m) wide and used some similar styling elements to those built for the heavier Bristol MW. The bus bodies were 9 feet 5 inches (2.87 m) high but the coaches were a little taller at 9 feet 10 inches (3.00 m); the length varied depending on the chassis and whether it was the bus or coach style (see table below). A forward entrance was provided opposite the driver's position. Seats were forward-facing in pairs, but where wheel arches protruded above the floor of the bus body, the seats were turned sideways to give sufficient leg room.

Model	Wheelbase	Body	Seats	Length	Production	Total built
SUL	15 feet (4.57 m)	Bus	36	27 feet 10 inches (8.48 m)	1960–1966	118
SUS	12 feet 4 inches (3.76 m)	Bus	30	24 feet 2 inches (7.37 m)	1960–1964	25
SUL	15 feet (4.57 m)	Coach	33	28 feet 2 inches (8.59 m)	1960–1962	38

== Operators ==
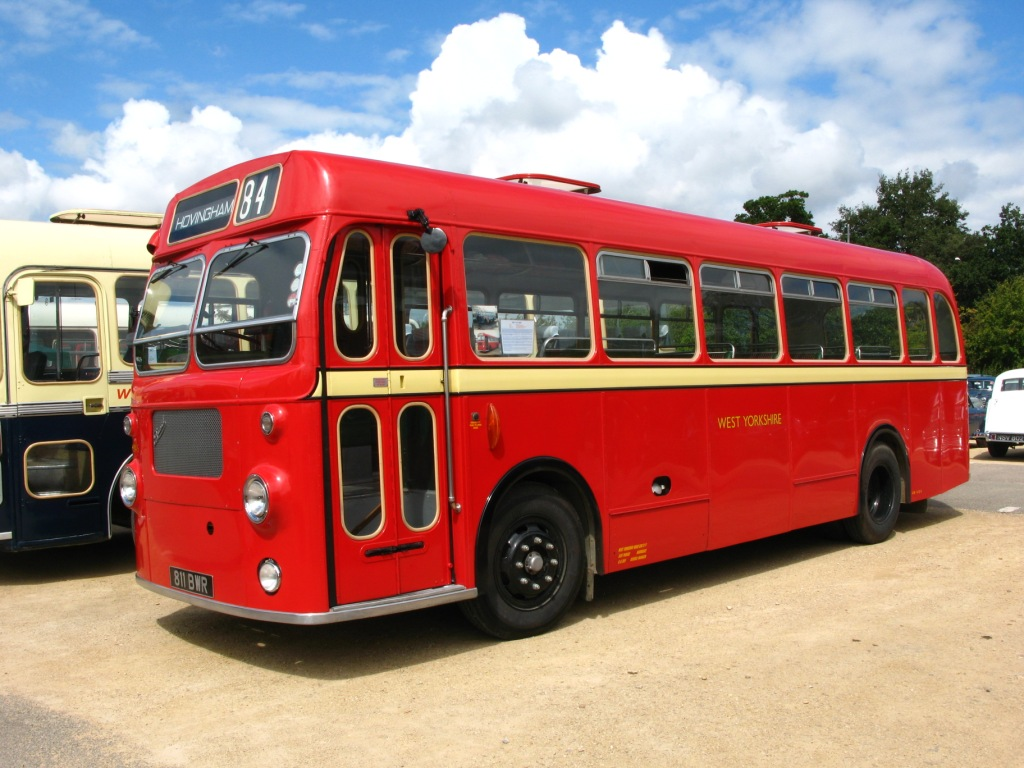
A preserved West Yorkshire SUL bus

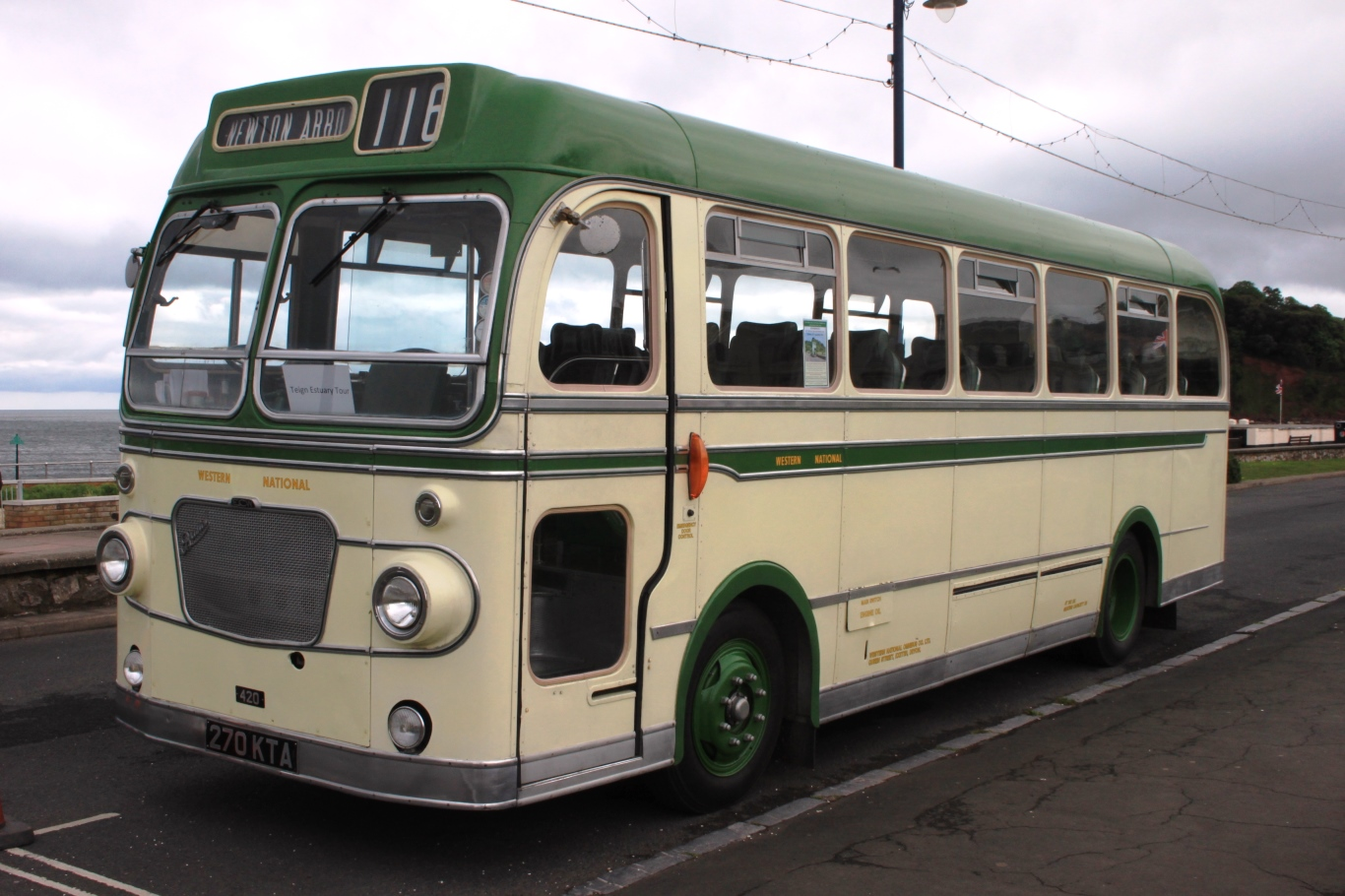
A preserved Western National SUL coach

The SUs were concentrated in the south-west of England, with 73% of them being built for the shared fleet of Southern National and Western National (Southern National was formally merged into Western National in 1969). The remainder were sold to six other companies that were owned by the Transport Holding Company.

Operator	Fleet numbers	Registrations	Model	Body	Total
Western National	400–403	334 EDV–337 EDV	SUL	coach	4
Southern National	404–407	314 EDV–317 EDV	SUL	coach	4
Western National	408	922 GUO	SUL	coach	1
Southern National	409–411	923 GUO–925 GUO	SUL	coach	3
Western National	412–416	917 GUO–921 GUO	SUL	coach	5
Western National	417–431	267 KTA–281 KTA	SUL	coach	15
Western National	432–435	284 KTA–287 KTA	SUL	coach	4
Western National	600–608	672 COD–680 COD	SUS	bus	9
Southern National	609–610	681 COD–682 COD	SUS	bus	2
Southern National	611–615	667 COD–671 COD	SUS	bus	5
Southern National	616–623	318 EDV–325 EDV	SUL	bus	8
Western National	624–644	338 EDV–358 EDV	SUL	bus	21
Western National	645–653	414 HDV–422 HDV	SUL	bus	9
Southern National	654–662	423 HDV–431 HDV	SUL	bus	9
Southern National	663–667	BDV 24C–BDV 248C	SUL	bus	5
Western National	668–674	BDV 249C–BDV 255C	SUL	bus	7
Western National	675–686	EDV 530D–EDV 541D	SUL	bus	12
Southern National	687–696	EDV 542D–EDV 559D	SUL	bus	10
Bristol Omnibus	300–302	861 RAE–863 RAE	SUS	bus	3
Bristol Omnibus	303–306	843 THY–846 THY	SUS	bus	4
Bristol Omnibus	307–308	AHW 226B–AHW 227B	SUS	bus	2
Southern Vectis	845–852	458 ADL–465 ADL	SUL	bus	8
United Automobile	S1–S2	AHN 901B–AHN 902B	SUL	bus	2
United Automobile	S3–S5	CHN 3C–CHN 5C	SUL	bus	3
United Counties	300–303	HRP 300D–HRP 303D	SUL	bus	4
United Counties	304–305	JNV 304D–JNV 305D	SUL	bus	2
United Welsh	10–11	752 BWN–753 BWN	SUL	coach	2
West Yorkshire	SMA1–SMA6	807 BWR–812 BWR	SUL	bus	6
York-West Yorkshire	YSMA7–YSMA12	859 DYG–864 DYG	SUL	bus	6
West Yorkshire	SMA13–SMA18	EWT 382C–EWT 387C	SUL	bus	6

The original operators generally kept their SUs running until the 1970s (Western National's last examples were withdrawn in 1979), afterwards selling many of them to independent operators such as Guernsey Motors. The last one in regular service was 280 KTA (originally Western National 430) which was operated by the Tillingbourne Bus Company until May 2000.

== Preservation ==
16 Bristol SUs are known to be in preservation: 3 SUS, 6 SUL buses and 7 SUL coaches, although some of the later had their bodies modified in service to make them suitable for operating bus services. The SUL buses include EWT 386C, the Perkins-engined example. 416 HDV was driven from the United Kingdom to India. It then returned to the UK and was then taken to USA and Canada before being sold to a preservationist in Mexico.

Chassis number	Registration	Model	Body	Original identity	Current identity
157.004	672 COD	SUS	bus	Western National 600	Western National 600
157.007	675 COD	SUS	bus	Western National 603	Western National 603
157.109	336 EDV	SUL	coach	Western National 402	Western National 1202
157.025	338 EDV	SUL	bus	Western National 624	Western National 624
190.012	416 HDV	SUL	bus	Western National 647	Western National 647
190.033	270 KTA	SUL	coach	Western National 420	Western National 420
190.036	271 KTA	SUL	coach	Western National 421	Ashtree Coaches 10
190.037	286 KTA	SUL	coach	Western National 434	Delta Tours 154
190.041	274 KTA	SUL	coach	Western National 424	Western National 1224
190.042	275 KTA	SUL	coach	Western National 425	Western National 425
190.047	280 KTA	SUL	coach	Western National 430	Western National 1230
190.050	862 RAE	SUS	bus	Bristol Omnibus 301	Bristol Omnibus 301
190.056	811 BWR	SUL	bus	West Yorkshire SMA5	West Yorkshire SMA5
226.012	EWT 386C	SUL	bus	West Yorkshire SMA17	Thornes 71
226.022	BDV 252C	SUL	bus	Western National 671	Western National 671
234.018	EDV 555D	SUL	bus	Southern National 692	Western National 692

At least five other Southern and Western National SULs survive, most of which have been converted to motor homes: buses 341 EDV, 351 EDV and EDV 531D; coaches 925 GUO and 276 KTA.
