= Bristol LH =

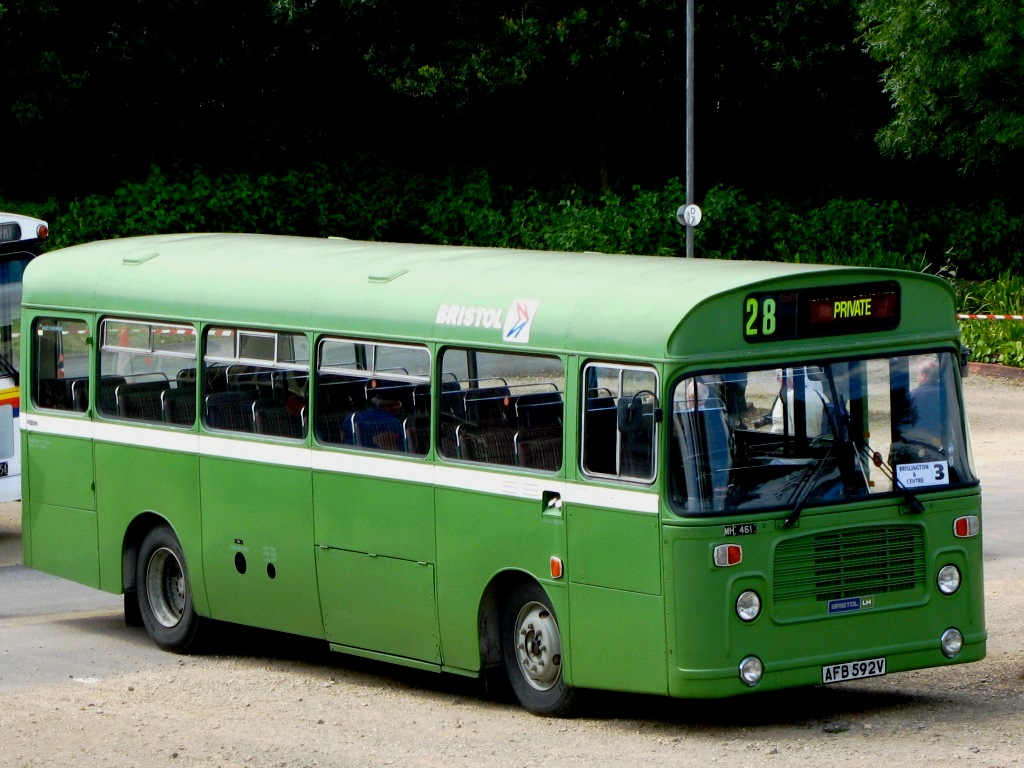

Overview
- Manufacturer: Bristol Commercial Vehicles
- Production: 1967–1982
- Assembly: Brislington, Bristol

Body and chassis
- Doors: One or (rarely) two
- Floor type: Step entrance
- Chassis: ladder-section steel with dropped extensions fore and aft.

Powertrain
- Engine: Leyland or Perkins
- Capacity: 25 to 53 seats
- Power output: 100-138 bhp
- Transmission: Turner Clark 5-sp synchromesh, Self-Changing Gears 5-speed semi-auto.

Dimensions
- Length: LH 30 feet (9.1 m); LHS 26 feet (7.9 m); LHL 36 feet (11 m)
- Width: Standard 7.5 feet (2.3 m); Wide 8.17 feet (2.5 m)
- Height: up to 3.2m depending on coachwork
- Curb weight: varied with length and coachwork

Chronology
- Predecessor: Bristol SU

The Bristol LH was a single-decker bus chassis built by Bristol Commercial Vehicles (BCV) in Bristol, England. Nearly 2,000 were built between 1967 and 1982 in a variety of sizes and body types, including some as goods vehicles.

== Models ==
The LH designation stood for Lightweight chassis, Horizontal engine. It replaced the Bristol SU and was succeeded by the Leyland National B Series for operators in need of a small or lightweight bus. The Bristol RE was in production at the same time for those in need of larger or more robust vehicles.

The standard Bristol LH model was 30 feet (9.1 m) long. It was also available as the 26 feet (7.9 m) LHS (LH Short) and the 36 feet (11 m) LHL (LH Long). The width of the chassis was 7.5 feet (2.3 m) but bodies as wide as 8.17 feet (2.5 m) the then maximum width, could be fitted, wide-bodied LHs have the wheels slightly inset in the wheelarches as a result.

The bus was available with a choice of six-cylinder diesel engines, either the Leyland O.400 (later replaced by the Leyland O.401) or the Perkins H6.354. The 5.8 litre H6.354 produced 101 bhp; the 6.54 litre O.400 had a peak output of 125 bhp whilst the 0.401 (from 1971) produced 138 bhp. The usual gearbox was a Turner-Clark synchromesh five-speed model with overdrive top gear. The front and rear axles were sourced from Leyland's Bathgate factory. Some buses were fitted with a Self-Changing Gears semi-automatic transmission and power steering. The engine was positioned in the centre of the chassis but its relatively high position meant that several steps were needed in the entrance. This was arranged in the overhang ahead of the front wheels allowing driver-only operation with the same person taking the fares and issuing tickets as passengers boarded. A small number of LH's, for Lancashire United Transport, Hants & Dorset and the Midland General group were also fitted with a central exit doorway. The radiator was positioned at the front of the chassis. The suspension was by half-elliptical leaf springs, although BCV had offered pneumatic suspension on heavier buses since 1962.

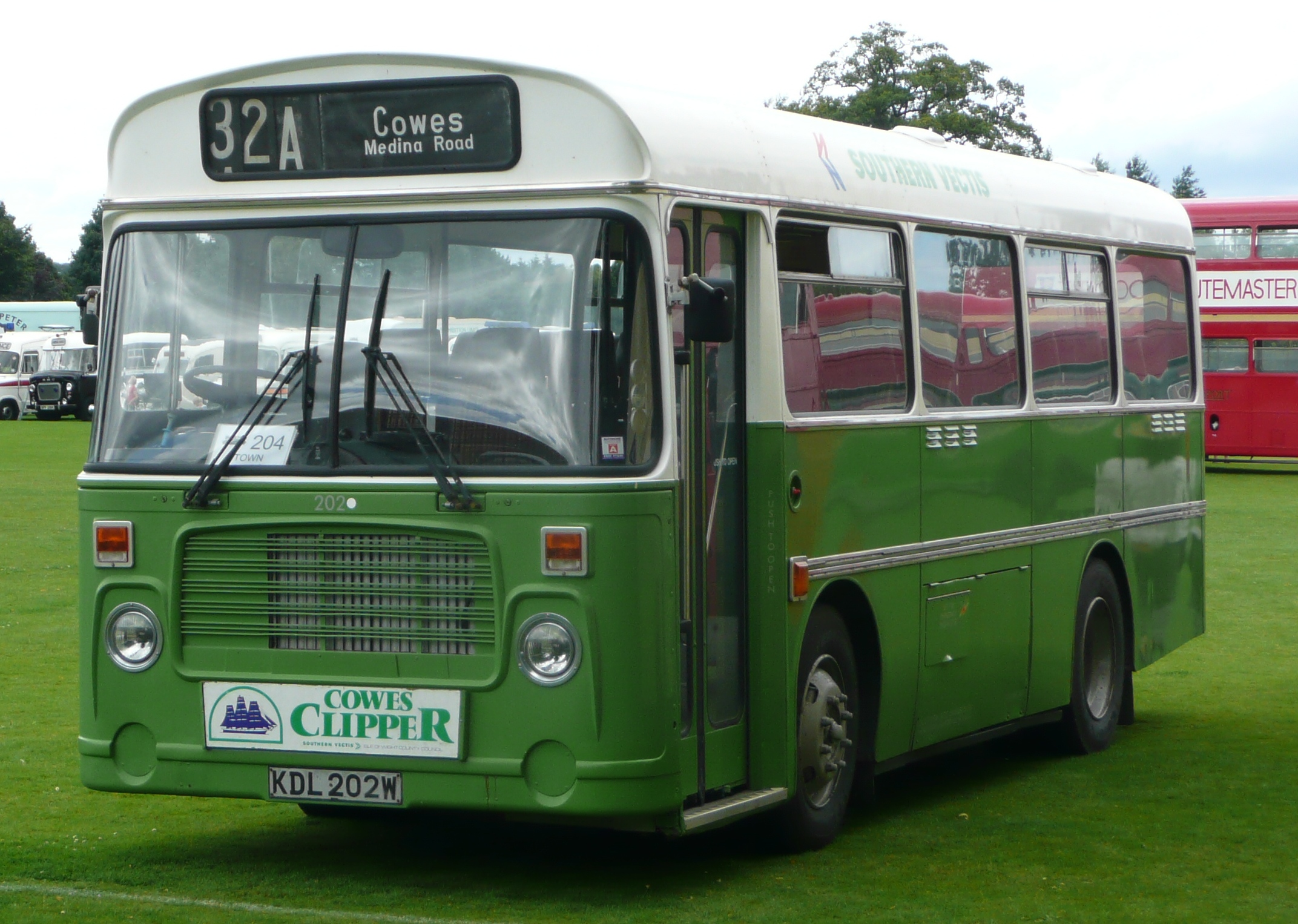
An LHS with standard narrow ECW body

Bodies were fitted by different manufacturers, who adapted them to the needs of different operators. Bodies could be fitted out as buses, coaches or dual purpose buses which could be used for coach services when traffic demanded. Bus bodies usually came from the Eastern Coach Works (ECW), which was owned by the same Transport Holding Company. This was a government-owned company but Leyland had acquired a 25% share in 1965. Plaxton bodies were preferred for coaches. Other manufacturers of bodies for the LH were Walter Alexander, Duple, East Lancashire, Marshall, Northern Counties, Weymann and Willowbrook. The only Weymann body was fitted to the first LHS6L built (LHX003) to the orders of Western Welsh. Weymann had been closed in 1965 and the body was originally mounted on an Albion Nimbus delivered to Western Welsh in 1961; modifications included extending the body wheelbase to match the chassis and fitting a Lodekka style grille to provide cooling for the radiator. WWOC numbered their LHS 1 and registered it MBO1F. It later passed to Thornes of Selby and is currently preserved.

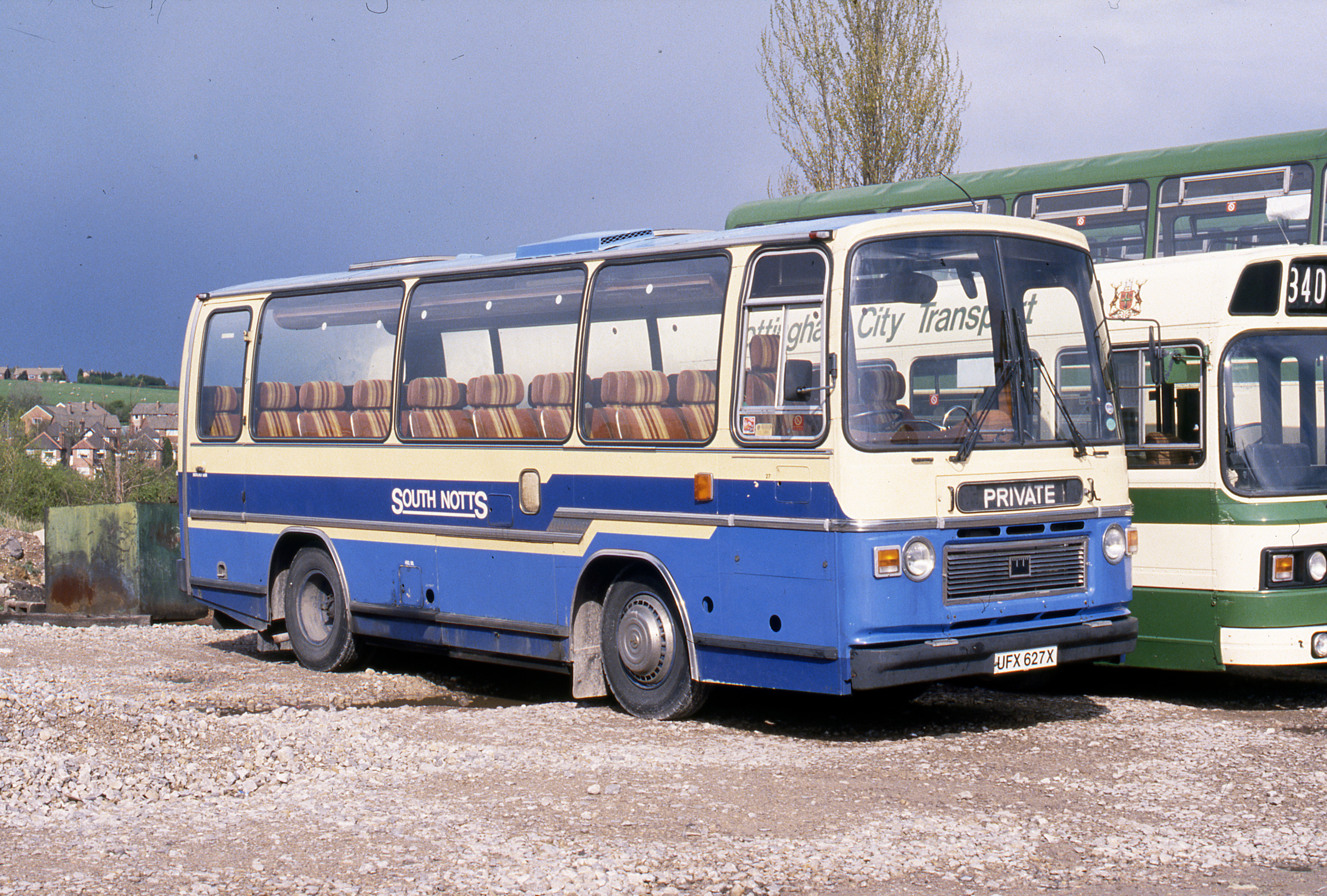
An LHS coach with Plaxton Supreme V body

For the standard LH the 41-seat Plaxton coach and 43-seat ECW bus were most widely used; the bus bodies manufactured in Belfast by Alexander for Ulsterbus had 45 seats, East Midland Motor Services' ten 1969 buses were the only ones with Willowbrook bodies, as built they had 45 seats but with a 3+2 seating arrangement in three rows forward of the rear bench, making room for a pram pen, they were also unusual in carrying no grille badge. The LHS was produced as both buses and coaches with 26 to 35 seats. The LHL had up to 53 seats as a coach or 55 as a bus. Between 1975 and 1982 Vanplan built eight with delivery van bodies.

Altogether nearly 2,000 LHs were built: 1,505 LH, 174 LHL and 308 LHS.

== Principal bus operators ==
The following lists only include vehicles ordered by the company named, however many took additional vehicles second-hand from other operators. The code following the chassis model 'type' column shows the number of seats. The prefix B represents a bus body, C a coach or DP a dual purpose vehicle. The suffix F shows a single front door, D shows dual front and centre doors.

=== Alexander Midland ===
Alexander Midland operated 41 LHs with Walter Alexander Y-type bodies and Perkins engines in Scotland. All but the last three were coaches.

| Fleet numbers | Registrations | Type | Built |
|---|---|---|---|
| MLH1–19 | SMS 671–678H, SWG 669–679H | LH C38F | 1970 |
| MLH20–33 | WMS 920J–925J, WWG 326J–333J | LH C41F | 1971 |
| MLH34–38 | BWG 334–338L | LH C41F | 1972 |
| MLH39–41 | BWG 339–341L | LH B45F | 1972 |

=== Bristol Omnibus ===
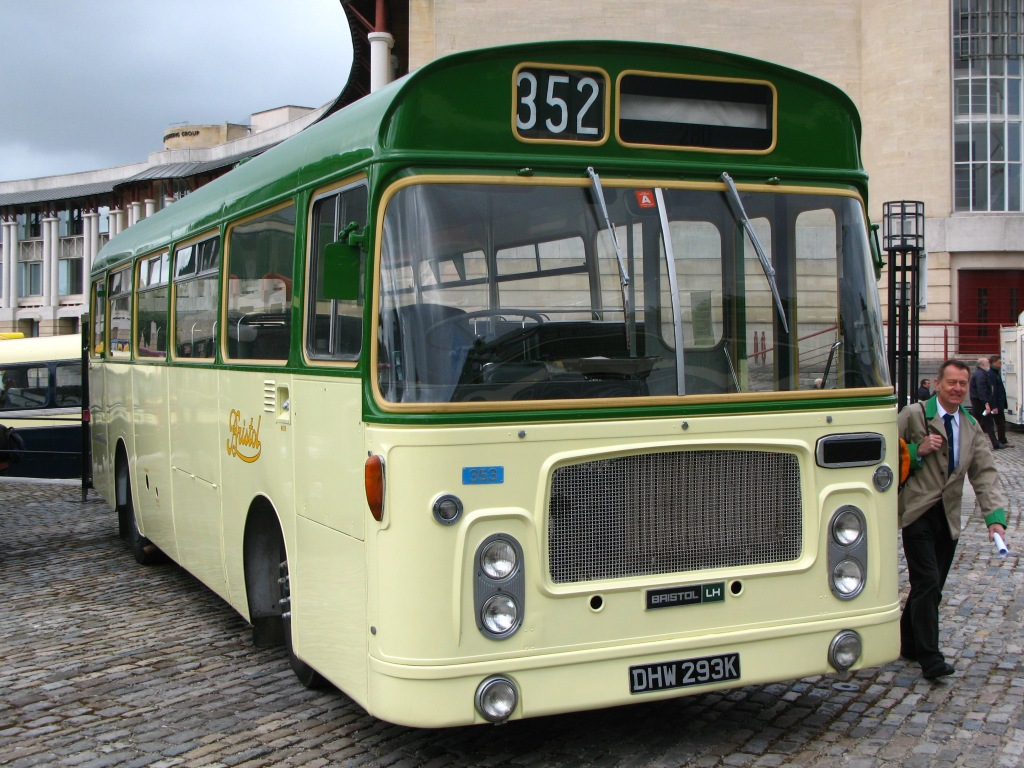
353 (DHW 293K)

Bristol Omnibus Company received six LH buses in 1971 with semi-automatic gearboxes. A further 110 (with manual gearboxes) were ordered for delivery between 1975 and 1980. A few more buses were acquired second hand including two LHSs from London Country.

| Fleet numbers | Registrations | Type | Built |
|---|---|---|---|
| 351–356 | DHW 291–296K | LH B43F | 1971 |
| 357–364 | JHW 117–124P | LH B43F | 1975 |
| 365–389 | KHU 315–330P, KHU 615–616P, JOU 162–165P, KHY 430–432P | LH B43F | 1976 |
| 390–421 | OFB 963–968R, OTC 604–608R, REU 312–332S | LH B43F | 1977 |
| 422–433 | SWS 768–774S, TTC 786–790T | LH B43F | 1978 |
| 434–453 | WAE 186–193T, WAE 294–295T | LH B43F | 1979 |
| 454–466 | AFB 585–597V | LH B43F | 1980 |

NB 351-356 were initially B44F but rebuilt with one less seat to allow a window to be inserted in the rear panel to improve the driver's view when reversing.

=== Crosville ===
Crosville operated services in Wales and north west England. They bought 16 Perkins-engined vehicles in 1969 and 40 with Leyland engines from 1975.

| Fleet numbers | Registrations | Type | Built |
|---|---|---|---|
| SLP144–159 | CFM 144–148G, DFM 149–159H | LH B45F | 1969 |
| SLL601–620 | KMA 531–536N, LMA 607–610P, MCA 611–620P | LH B43F | 1975 |
| SLL621–640 | OCA 621–640P | LH B45F | 1976 |

=== Eastern Counties ===
Eastern Counties Omnibus Company took 50 LH and 5 LHS buses between 1968 and 1972, these were all Perkins-engined and the LHS6Ps had been ordered by Luton Corporation and delivered to United Counties Omnibus Company with registrations XXE131-5H, UCOC did not want them so ECOC took them on, re-registering them with Norfolk, rather than Luton marks. Eastern Counties did not take any more new LHs until 1977 when 15 LH6Ls were added to the fleet.

| Fleet numbers | Registrations | Type | Built |
|---|---|---|---|
| LH523–531 | CNG 523–526K, DNG 527–531K | LH B45F | 1971 |
| LH532–537 | DPW2 532K, FNG 533–534K, GNG 535–536K, HAH 537H | LH B43F | 1972 |
| LHS595–599 | WNG 101–105H | LHS B37F | 1970 |
| LH685–692 | RAH 685–692F | LH B45F | 1968 |
| LH693–702 | UNG 693–695G, VAH 696–702H | LH B45F | 1969 |
| LH899–916 | WNH 899–901H, XPW 902–906H, YAH 907–911H, YPW 912–916H | LH B45F | 1970 |
| LH917–931 | TCL 137–142R, TCL 136R, WEX 924–931S | LH B43F | 1977 |

=== Eastern National ===
Eastern National bought four LH6Ls in 1977, all with Leyland O.401 engines, 5-speed manual gearboxes, ECW bodies and dual headlight fronts. They were intended for the more lightly loaded rural routes and were operated out of the Colchester depot. All four were sold to Hedingham & District Omnibuses in 1982 and one has been preserved.

| Fleet numbers | Registrations | Type | Built |
|---|---|---|---|
| 1100 - 1103 | UVX 4S - UVX 7S | LH B43F | 1977 |

=== Eastern Scottish ===
Eastern Scottish was the only Scottish Bus Group company to order LHs apart from Alexander Midland when they took 34 Perkins-engined LHs finished by Walter Alexander as Y-type coaches.

| Fleet numbers | Registrations | Type | Built |
|---|---|---|---|
| YA315–348 | OSF 315–332G, SFS 333–348H | LH C38F | 1970 |

=== Hants & Dorset ===
Hants & Dorset and the associated Wilts & Dorset company were unusual in specifying dual-door configuration for their early LHs. Buses in the 521–530 series were allocated to Wilts & Dorset, the remainder to Hants & Dorset.

| Fleet numbers | Registrations | Type | Built |
|---|---|---|---|
| 521–526 | REL 746 – 748H, RRU 692–694H | LH B39D | 1969 |
| 527–528 | TRU 227–228J | LH B39D | 1970 |
| 529–530 | UEL 567–568J | LH B43F | 1970 |
| 828 | NLJ 817G | LH B39D | 1968 |
| 1539–1548 | XEL 825–834K | LH B43F | 1971 |
| 3026–3035 | REL 743–745H, RLJ 789–795H | LH B39D | 1969 |
| 3051–3055 | TRU 220–224J | LH B39D | 1970 |
| 3056–3057 | ULJ 367–368H | LH B43F | 1970 |
| 3501–3529 | DEL 537–546L, NEL 844–847M, NLJ 515–529M | LH B43F | 1973 |
| 3530–3561 | ORU 530–541M, GLJ 474–493N | LH B43F | 1974 |
| 3562 - 3579 | HJT 34 – 48N, HPW 395 – 397N | LH B43F | 1975 |
| 3806–3811 | LJT 939–944P | LH B43F | 1975 |

=== Lincolnshire ===
Lincolnshire is a largely rural county so Lincolnshire Road Car always had a need for a number of small buses. Their orders amounted to 72 standard buses, 24 dual purpose, and 10 LHS buses.

| Fleet numbers | Registrations | Type | Built |
|---|---|---|---|
| 1001–1006 | KFE 296–299H, KFE 301–302H | LH B43F | 1969 |
| 1007–1010 | LVL 371–372H, LVL 901–902J | LH B43F | 1970 |
| 1011–1014 | NVL 448–450K, NVL 613K | LH B43F | 1971 |
| 1015–1022 | OVL 448–449K, OVL 451–452K, RFE 432K, RVL 248–249L, RVL 251L | LH B43F | 1972 |
| 1023–1029 | SVL 20–23L, UVL 572–574M | LH B43F | 1973 |
| 1030–1035 | WFE 675–679M, WFE 839M | LH B43F | 1974 |
| 1036–1044 | JTL 774–778M, LTL 660–663P | LH B43F | 1975 |
| 1045–1061 | SVL 830–837R, UFE 286–290R, XFW 949–956S | LH B43F | 1977 |
| 1062–1072 | YVL 836–837S, DTL 540–548T | LH B43F | 1978 |
| 1651–1656 | GVL 907–912F | LH DP41F | 1968 |
| 1657–1661 | JVL 363–364G, JVL 613–614G,615H | LH DP41F | 1969 |
| 1662–1668 | JVL 926H, KVL 449–454H | LH DP41F | 1970 |
| 1669–1674 | NFE 644–649J | LH DP41F | 1971 |
| 1801–1803 | GVL 913–915G | LHS B35F | 1968 |
| 1804–1810 | JVL 701G, JVL 616–618H, JVL 927–929H | LHS B35F | 1969 |

=== London Country ===
London Country Bus Services 23 standard width LHSs (their BL class) and 44 narrow LHSs (their BN class) as no other suitable narrow vehicles were available at the time.

| Fleet numbers | Registrations | Type | Built |
|---|---|---|---|
| BL1–23 | RPH 101–111L, SPK 112–123L | LHS B35F | 1973 |
| BL24–53 | XPD 124–130N, GPD 299–321N | LHS B35F | 1974 |
| BN54–67 | TPJ 54–67S | LHS B35F | 1977 |

=== London Transport ===
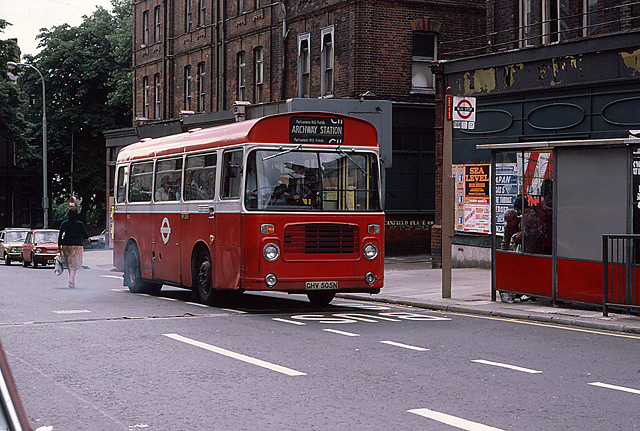
BS5 (GHV 505N)

Several versions of the Bristol LH were used by London Transport. 17 narrow LHSs with five-speed gearboxes were delivered to in 1975 to replace Ford Transit minibuses on narrow roads. Although fitted with five-speed gearboxes the first gear was blocked off to make driving easier in traffic. In 1976 95 full length vehicles with automatic transmissions and narrow bodies were purchased. The 7 ft 6in bodies were not only because of narrow roads on some routes, but also due to the restricted space at Kingston garage in Surrey which prevented the Leyland National being deployed there. LHSs were classified by London Transport as BS; full length LHs were classified BL.

| Fleet numbers | Registrations | Type | Built |
|---|---|---|---|
| BL1–95 | KJD 401–440P, OJD 41–95R | LH B39F | 1976 |
| BS1–17 | GHV 501–506N, OJD 7–17R | LHS B26F | 1976 |

=== United ===
United Automobile Services had five coaches with Plaxton Elite bodies, but the remaining 218 LHs ordered for this fleet were standard ECW bus bodies for services in north-east England. A number of second-hand buses were also acquired.

| Fleet numbers | Registrations | Type | Built |
|---|---|---|---|
| 1081–1085 | BHN 981–985H | LH C41F | 1970 |
| 1501–1514 | THN 601–605F, UHN 796–798G, THN 607F, THN 609F, UHN 800G, YHN 811–814H | LH B45F | 1968 |
| 1515–1520 | AHN 315–320H | LH B45F | 1969 |
| 1521–1554 | PHN 512–554L | LH B43F | 1972 |
| 1555–1600 | VHN 855–870M, WHN 571–600M | LH B43F | 1973 |
| 1601–1634 | AHN 601–612M, GUP 897–918N | LH B43F | 1974 |
| 1635–1665 | HUP 791–801N, LGR 646–655P, MGR 656–661P, NBR 662–665P | LH B43F | 1975 |
| 1666–1685 | NGR 666–685P | LH B43F | 1976 |
| 1686–1700 | XPT 686–689R, XUP 690–693R, CGR 894–900S | LH B43F | 1977 |
| 1701–1718 | LPT 701–711T, MUP 712–714T, SUP 715–718V | LH B43F | 1979 |

=== Western National ===
Much of south west England is rural in nature and many narrow roads mean that Western National needed a large fleet of small buses. In 1969 the associated Southern National fleet was merged with Western National. The coach services of both companies were mostly operated under the Royal Blue brand. Neighbouring Devon General was also brought under Western National control in 1971, having just placed their first order for 6 LHs (88–93).

The orders for this large fleet of 209 buses and coaches were spread across ECW, Marshall, Plaxton and even Duple. Second hand vehicles brought the total number of LHs operated up to nearly 300.

| Fleet numbers | Registrations | Type | Built |
|---|---|---|---|
| 88–93 | VOD 88–93K | LHS B33F (Marshall) | 1971 |
| 94–96 | LFJ 848–850W | LHS B35F (ECW) | 1980 |
| 100–103 | PUO 100–103M | LH B43F (ECW) | 1974 |
| 104–107 | GDV 461–464N | LH B43F (ECW) | 1974 |
| 108–115 | KTT 38–45P | LH B43F (ECW) | 1975 |
| 116–121 | STT 408–413R | LH B43F (ECW) | 1977 |
| 712–726 | MUO 324–338F | LH B41F (ECW) | 1968 |
| 727–740 | PTA 757–759G, POD 801–802H, PTA 660–662G, POD 803–808H | LH B43F (ECW) | 1969 |
| 750–763 | POD 809–822H | LH B43F (ECW) | 1970 |
| 1250–1255 | VOD 120–125K | LHS B33F (Marshall) | 1972 |
| 1300–1311 | RDV 435–446H | LH C41F (Duple) | 1970 |
| 1312–1315 | UTT 578–581J | LH C41F (Plaxton) | 1971 |
| 1316–1325 | BDV 316L, NTT 317M, BDV 318L, NTT 319–325M | LH C39F (Marshall) | 1973 |
| 1326–1331 | PUO 326–331M | LH C41F (Plaxton) | 1974 |
| 1556–1563 | FDV 786–793V | LHS B35F (ECW) | 1979 |
| 1564–1574 | SUO 429–432H, TTA 557–558H, TTA 737H, TUO 265–268J | LH B43F (ECW) | 1970 |
| 1575–1588 | VOD 106–119K | LH B43F (ECW) | 1971 |
| 1601–1606 | PTT 601–606M | LH B43F (ECW) | 1974 |
| 1607–1611 | GDV 456–460N | LH B43F (ECW) | 1974 |
| 1612–1623 | HTT 367–376N, KTT 37P, KTT 46P | LH B43F (ECW) | 1975 |
| 1624–1630 | VDV 124–130S | LH B43F (ECW) | 1977 |
| 3100–3103 | PTT 70–73R | LH C41F (Plaxton) | 1977 |
| 3114–3123 | SFJ 114–123R | LH C41F (Plaxton) | 1977 |
| 3124–3134 | VDV 131–133S, VOD 627–629S, AFJ691–698T | LH C41F (Plaxton) | 1978 |
| 3400–3413 | PTT 100–107R, SFJ 108–113R | LH C41F (Plaxton) | 1977 |

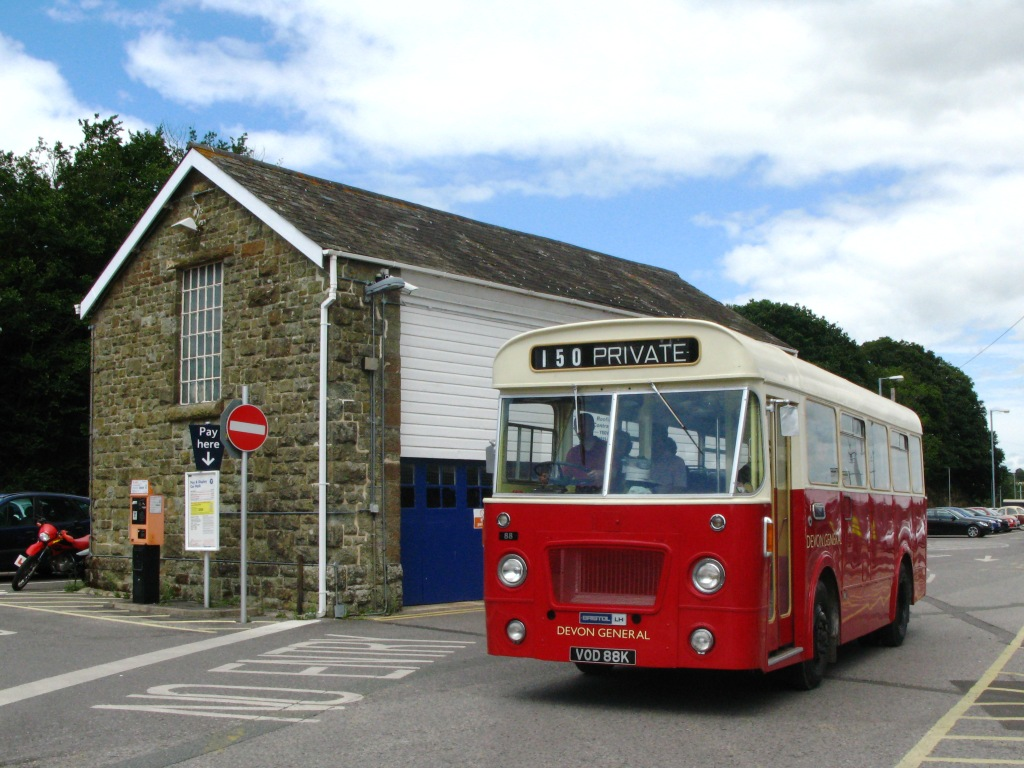
88 (VOD 88K)
LHS/Marshall bus

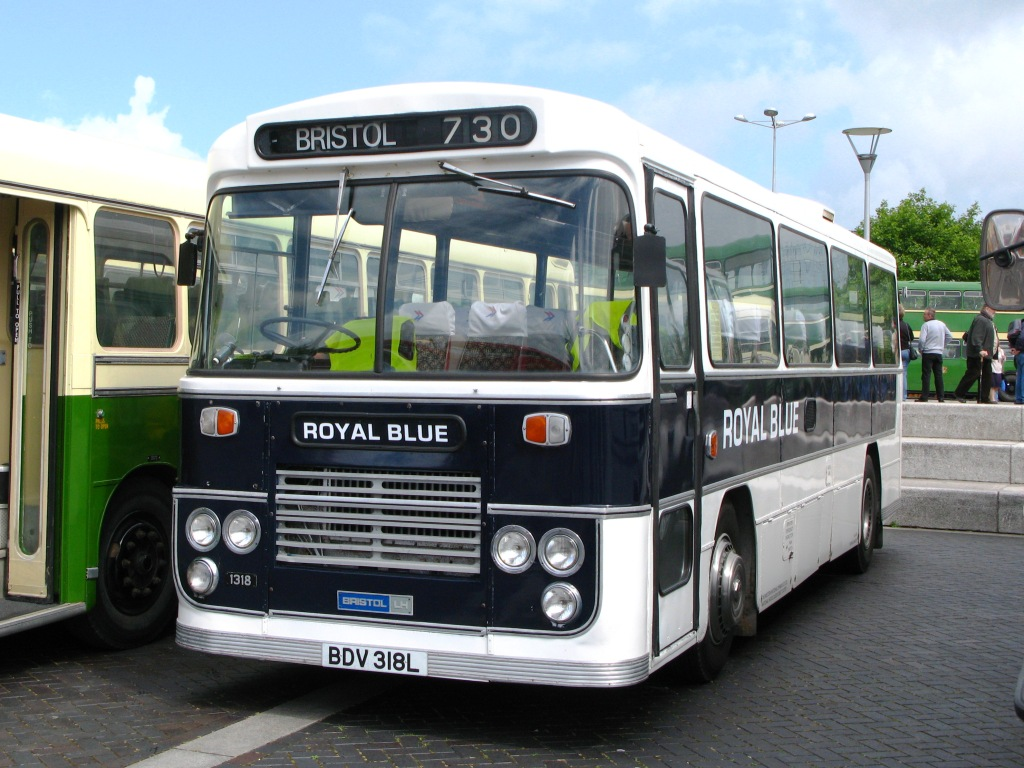
1318 (BDV 318L
LH/Marshall coach

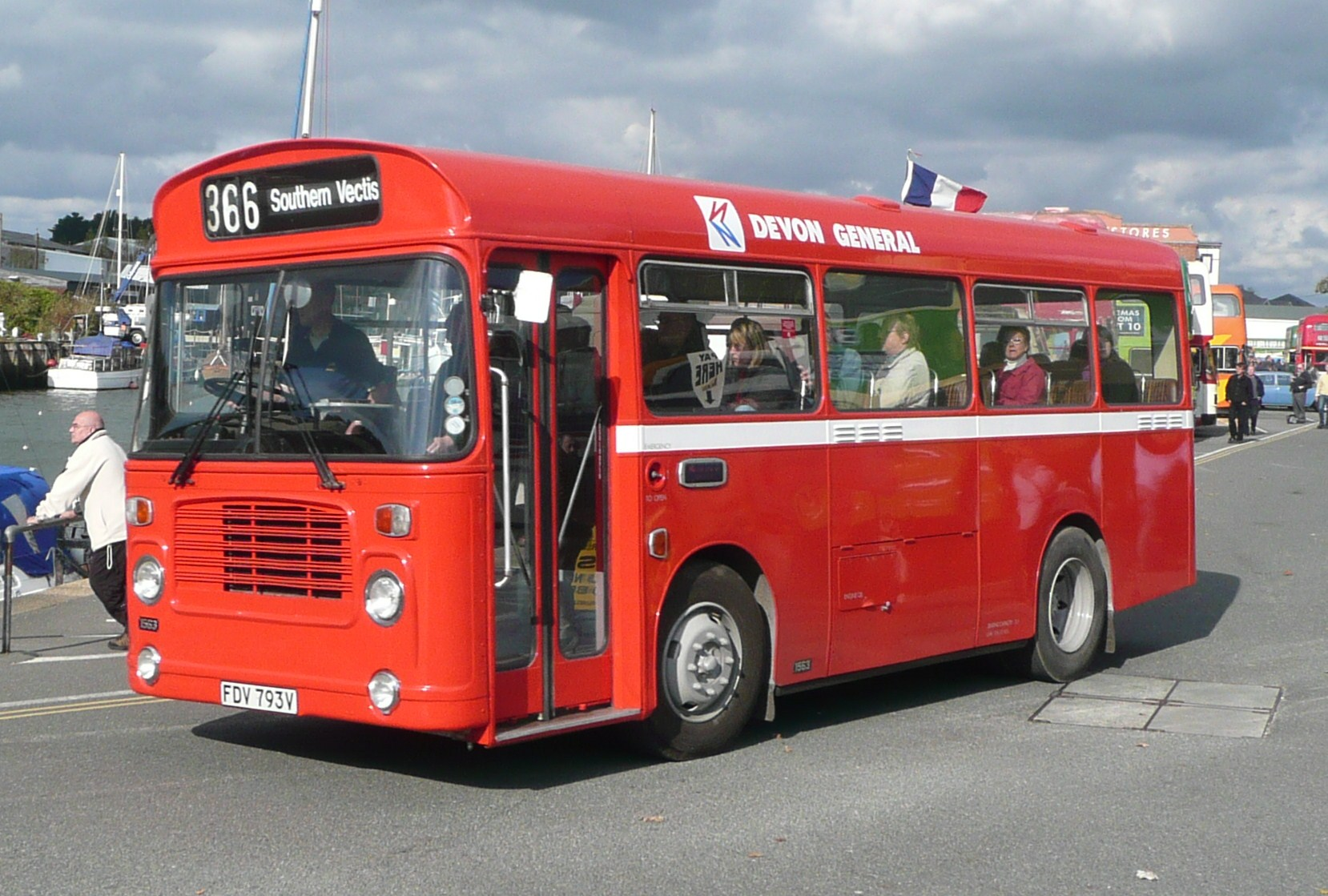
1563 (FDV 793V)
LHS/ECW bus

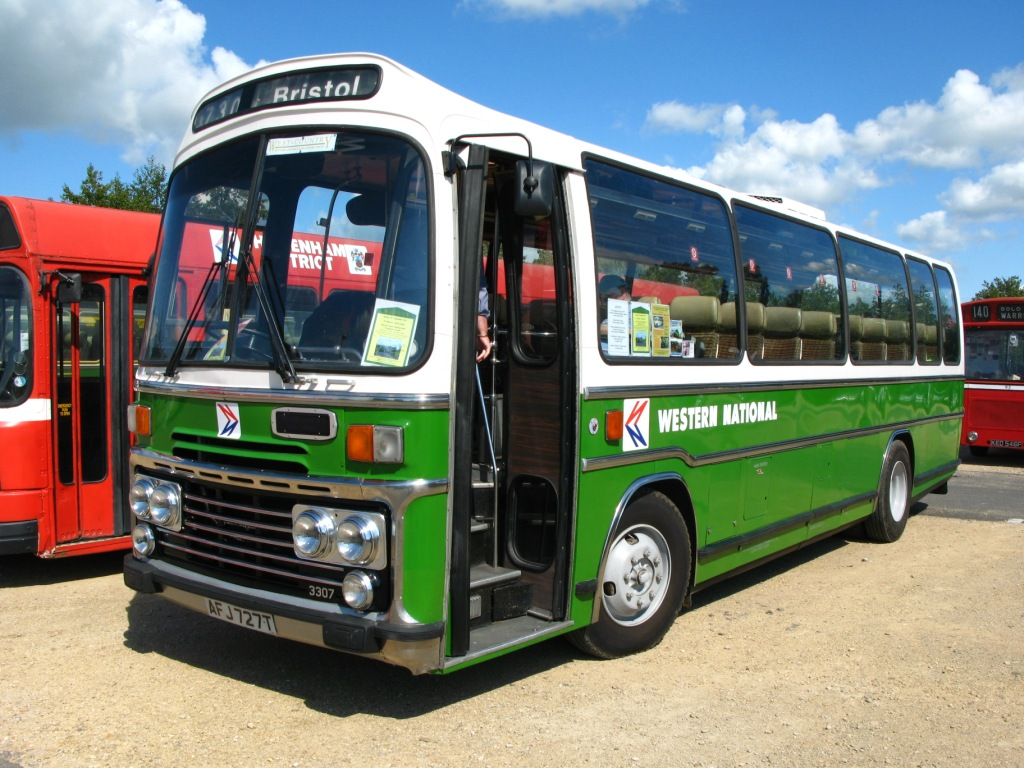
3307 (AFJ 727T)
LH/Plaxton coach

== Non-passenger use ==
Between 1972 and 1982 Lawrence Wilson & Son bought 3 LH and 10 LHL chassis which were fitted with panel van bodies. The first three LHLs were completed by Marsden and the remainder by Vanplan. They were used for delivering Wilson's Silver Cross brand of prams. One further LH (CUT 730K in 1972) was fitted out as a racing car transporter for Wheatcroft of Leicester.

== Road-rail bus ==
A former Hants & Dorset standard LH (NEL 847M of 1973) was fitted with additional flanged wheels in 1980 to allow it to operate on railway lines. It was owned by the North East London Polytechnic of Dagenham and some work was done by Lucas Aerospace. It was tested on the West Somerset Railway between Bishops Lydeard and Crowcombe Heathfield in August 1980.

== See also ==
- List of buses
