= Bristol Commercial Vehicles =

Vehicle manufacturer of buses, trucks and railbus

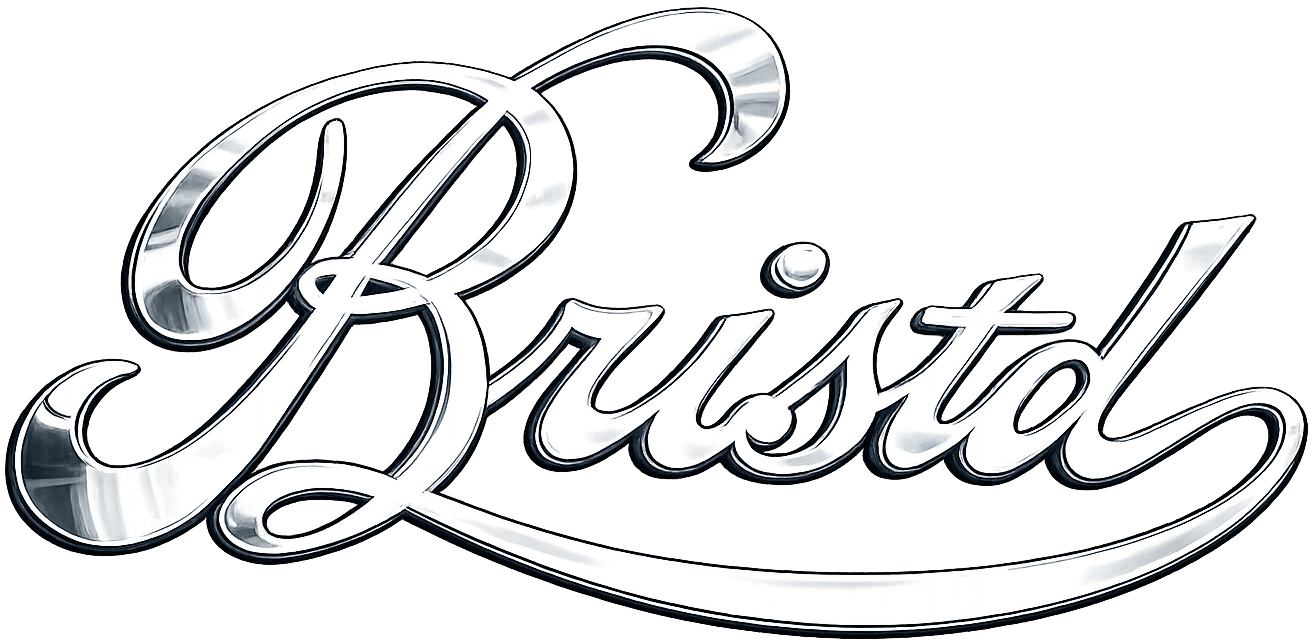
- The Bristol scroll featured on the radiator of vehicles
- Company type: Privately held company, later Public company
- Industry: Vehicle manufacture
- Founded: Bristol, England, 1908
- Defunct: 1983
- Key people: George White (founder)
- Parent: Bristol Tramways & Carriage Co

Bristol Commercial Vehicles was a vehicle manufacturer located in Bristol, England. Most production was of buses but trucks and railbus chassis were also built.

The Bristol Tramways and Carriage Company started to build buses for its own use in 1908 and soon started building vehicles for other companies. In 1955 this part of the business was separated out as Bristol Commercial Vehicles Limited. It closed in 1983 when production was moved to its then parent company Leyland.

== History ==
The first trams of the Bristol Tramways Company ran in 1875, and in 1906 the company started to operate motor buses to bring extra passengers to their trams. In 1908 the company decided to build bus chassis for its own use, the first one entering service on 12 May.

The Motor Department was initially based at the tram depot in Brislington, on the road that leads east from Bristol to Bath. The Car Building Works there had been responsible for erecting electric trams and had gone on to build horse-drawn vehicles for the company. The first motor bodies built there had been three charabanc bodies constructed in 1907 for the Thornycroft buses delivered the previous year. During 1907 the bus fleet was transferred to the tram depot at Filton to the north west of the city. In 1908 the company built its first six buses. The chassis were erected by the Motor Department and three bodies each at Brislington and the company's carriage works in Leek Lane, north Bristol.

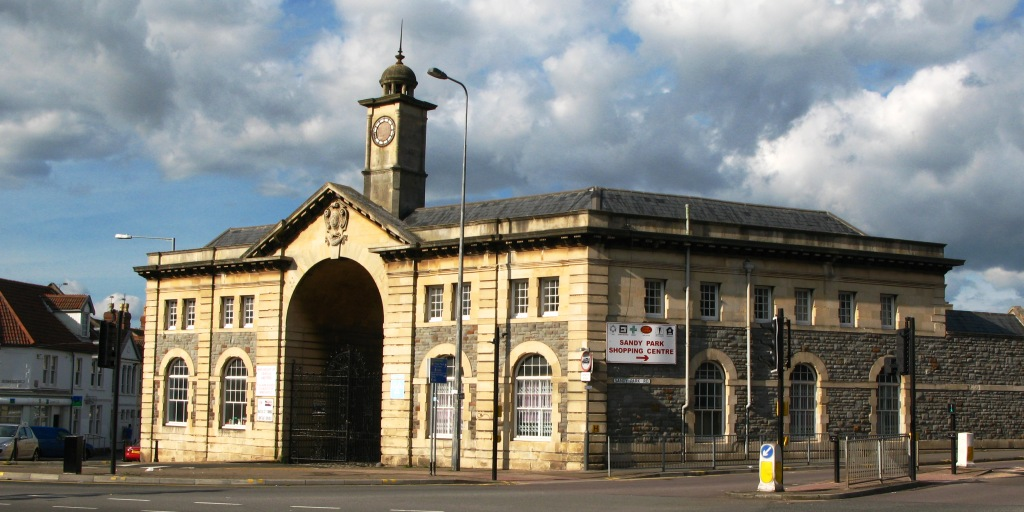
Brislington tram depot, one of the sites used to build Bristol buses.

In 1910 the company decided to build aeroplanes, forming the British and Colonial Aeroplane Company, Ltd. The best place for this work was the sheds occupied by the Motor Department at Filton, so motor repairs and construction returned to Brislington. The tram depot proved too small for the volume of work and so a new 4 acres (1.6 ha) site, to be known as the Motor Constructional Works, was purchased nearby in Kensington Hill, Brislington.

In May 1914 it supplied its first bus to another operator, a C50 fitted out as a charabanc for Imperial Tramways at Middlesbrough. The two companies shared a chairman, Sir George White, who in January had taken some buses out of service in Bristol to send to Middlesbrough when a rival company had tried to start a competitive service. The Middlesbrough order was followed by a number of trucks for the Royal Navy Air Service.

The Great Western Railway bought a controlling interest in the tramway company in 1929 but the bus interests of the railway were transferred to Western National in 1931. This brought Bristol Tramways and its manufacturing activities into the Tilling Group. It was a policy decision by the Tilling Group to adopt the diesel engine as the standard power unit, which started a period of many decades of installing Gardner diesel engines to Bristol chassis. Other companies in the group increasingly turned to Bristol to provide their chassis. Many Bristol chassis were taken to Eastern Coach Works (ECW) at Lowestoft, another member of the Tilling Group, where bodies were added. The un-bodied chassis were moved between the two towns by delivery drivers wearing substantial weatherproof suits.

Bristol Commercial Vehicles (BCV) was created in 1943 as a subsidiary of Bristol Tramways. The Transport Act saw the nationalisation of the Tilling Group into the British Transport Commission (BTC) in 1948. BCV and ECW soon found themselves restricted to selling products to other BTC operators. Nationalisation also brought the task of supervision of the Ministry of Supply's motor repair works at Kingswood. In 1955 BCV became an independent company owned by the BTC. Rationalisation of activities saw new body construction cease at Bristol in 1956.

Changes in government policy in 1965 allowed the Leyland Motor Corporation to buy some shares in BCV and ECW so that their products could once again be sold to independent operators. The last new chassis to carry a Bristol badge was a VRT/SL double-deck bus built in 1981. For a while the factory continued to build buses with Leyland badges, notably the Olympian which had been designed by the staff at Brislington. All work ended in October 1983 when the final Bristol-built Olympian chassis was sent to ECW to receive its body for Devon General (where it was registered A686 KDV). Work was then transferred to other Leyland factories.

== Products ==
=== Chassis ===
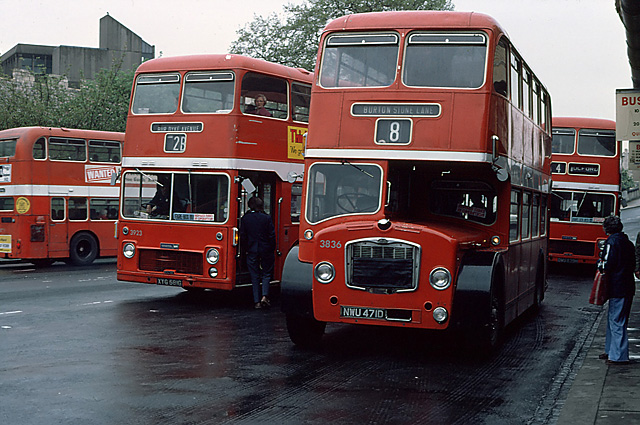
A VRT/SL of 1969 (centre left) and an FS of 1966 (centre right).

Early chassis types were given a C-series number. When a new lower frame was introduced in 1920 they were known simply by the capacity of the body that was designed to be fitted. From 1925 a sequential letter system was given that ran from A to M, although the M type never went into full production. This was replaced by a new series that used initials to describe the vehicle, such as 'RE' for 'rear engine'.

Different chassis letter codes were used to identify different sizes of petrol engines, but with the introduction of diesel engines from 1933 the size and manufacturer was shown by a suffix to the main code. In this way LD5G denoted an LD with a five-cylinder Gardner engine and FS6B an FS with a six-cylinder Bristol engine, and so on.

All early chassis were used for either single deck buses or goods vehicles. In 1931 a longer J type single deck chassis was offered to exploit the increased length now permissible but this was replaced by the L in 1937. In 1952 by a new Light Saloon was introduced which was built on integral principles. It had no true chassis but lightweight running units were fitted to a special ECW body that gave the bus its strength and rigidity. A more conventional Medium Weight chassis was offered from 1957. A larger single deck, the rear-engined RE, was produced in 1962 and shorter versions to replace the MW appeared in 1968 along with a Lightweight Horizontal engined chassis, to replace the SU midibus and sell to the private sector as a lightweight coach, the LH.

The G was introduced in 1931 as a dedicated double deck chassis, but this was replaced by the K in 1937. Larger versions were offered as laws changed to allow an increase in both width and length, but in 1949 a radically different double deck prototype was tested. This had a specially designed chassis that allowed a conventional body to be fitted within the height of a 'lowbridge' profile, which with a conventional chassis was only possible with gangways below floor level and very restricted headroom inside. This prototype became the Lodekka which remained in production in various forms until 1968. By this time a rear-engine double deck, the VR was available.

The last VRs and LHs were built in 1981 and the last REs in 1982, but production switched to Leyland-badged chassis. These included the B21 and B52 single deck urban bus chassis and the Olympian double deck.

=== Models ===
Note that the 'type' shown in the table below refers to the most common configuration. Double deck bus chassis were sometimes given single deck bodies, and bus chassis were often given goods bodies.

Model	Introduced	Type	Length	Engine	Number built	Comments
C40	1908	Single deck		4 cylinder	14	Chain-drive transmission
C45	1912	Single deck		4 cylinder	29	
C60	1912	Single deck		4 cylinder	19	
C65	1913	Single deck		4 cylinder	9	
C50	1914	Single deck		4 cylinder	53	
4 ton	1921	Double deck	22.8 feet (6.9 m)	4 cylinder	649	Prototype built 1915 as W type. Later offered as 24.8 feet (7.6 m).
2 ton	1923	Single deck	16.75 feet (5.11 m)	4 cylinder		First chassis with driving position alongside engine. Also offered as 18.25 feet (5.56 m).
A	1925	Double deck	25.5 feet (7.8 m)	4 cylinder	23	
B	1926	Single deck	26 feet (7.9 m)	4 cylinder	778	'Bristol Superbus'
C	1929	N/A		6 cylinder	2	Three-axle chassis prototypes subsequently used for E type trolleybuses.
D	1929	Double deck	26 feet (7.9 m)	6 cylinder	50	
E	1929	Double deck trolleybus		Electric	2	Three-axle based on C type chassis, one with Roe body for Doncaster, the other with Beadle body for Pontypridd.
G	1931	Double deck	26.5 feet (8.1 m)	6 cylinder		
H	1931	Single deck	27.5 feet (8.4 m)	4 cylinder	106	
J	1931	Single deck	27.5 feet (8.4 m)	6 cylinder	330	
JO	1933	Single deck	27.5 feet (8.4 m)	Diesel	606	JO = J Oil, i.e. Diesel-engined
GO	1935	Double deck	26.5 feet (8.1 m)	Diesel		GO = G Oil, i.e. Diesel-engined
K	1937	Double deck	26 feet (7.9 m)	Diesel	2774	
L	1937	Single deck	27.5 feet (8.4 m)	Diesel	2426	
LL	1946	Single deck	30 feet (9.1 m)	Diesel	387	LL = L Long. Export model until 1950.
LWL		Single deck	30 feet (9.1 m)	Diesel	401	LWL = L Wide Long: wider version of LL chassis. Export model until 1950.
KW	1947	Double deck	26 feet (7.9 m)	Diesel	20	KW = K Wide: wider version of K chassis.
M	1948			Diesel	2	The last of the purely alphabetic type codes. Chassis prototypes never given bodies.
KS	1950	Double deck	27 feet (8.2 m)	Diesel	236	KS = K Short, i.e. shorter than the proposed 30-foot KL (which was never produced). Engine flexibly mounted to the frame.
KSW	1950	Double deck	27 feet (8.2 m)	Diesel	1116	KSW = K Short Wide: wider version of KS chassis.
LS	1950	Single deck	30 feet (9.1 m)	Diesel	1409	LS = Light Saloon. Integral chassis and body.
HG	1952	Goods	29.8 feet (9.1 m)	Diesel	517	HG = Heavy Goods. An eight-wheel rigid vehicle.
SC	1954	Single deck	27.5 feet (8.4 m)	Diesel	323	SC = Small Capacity
LD	1954	Double deck	27 feet (8.2 m)	Diesel	2180	LD = Lo Dekka. Prototype tested from 1949.
HA	1955	Goods	14 feet (4.3 m)	Diesel	653	HA = Heavy Articulated. A tractor for articulated vehicle (946 ST Semi Trailers were constructed), it was later built as 15 feet (4.6 m) long to accommodate a larger engine.
LDL	1957	Double deck	30 feet (9.1 m)	Diesel		Longer version of LD chassis
MW	1957	Single deck		Diesel	1965	MW = Medium Weight
SUL	1960	Single deck	27.8 feet (8.5 m)	Diesel	156	SUL = Small, Underfloor engine, Long
SUS	1960	Single deck	24.2 feet (7.4 m)	Diesel	25	SUS = Small, Underfloor engine, Short
FLF	1960	Double deck		Diesel	1867	FLF = Flat-floor, long, Front entrance
FL	1960	Double deck		Diesel		FL = Flat-floor, long (rear entrance). Discontinued in 1962.
FS	1960	Double deck	27 feet (8.2 m)	Diesel	890	FS = Flat-floor, short (rear entrance)
FSF		Double deck	27 feet (8.2 m)	Diesel		FSF = Flat-floor, short, front entrance. Discontinued in 1962.
RELL	1962	Single deck	36 feet (11 m)	Diesel	2839	RELL = Rear Engine, Long Low
RELH	1962	Single deck	36 feet (11 m)	Diesel	976	RELH = Rear Engine, Long High
VRT/SL	1966	Double deck		Diesel	4300 (approx.)	VRT = Vertical Rear Transverse engine, Short Low
VRT/LL		Double deck		Diesel	107	VRT = Vertical Rear Transverse engine, Long Low
VRL/LH		Double deck		Diesel	55	VRL = Vertical Rear Longitudinal engine, Long, High
VRT/LH		Double deck		Diesel	60	VRT = Vertical Rear Transverse engine, Long High
RESL	1967	Single deck		Diesel	698	RESL = Rear Engine, Short Low
RESH	1967	Single deck		Diesel	11	RESH = Rear Engine, Short High
REMH	1968	Single deck	39 feet (12 m)	Diesel	105	REMH = Rear Engine, Maximum length, High
LH	1968	Single deck	30 feet (9.1 m)	Diesel	1505	LH = Lightweight Horizontal engine
LHS	1968	Single deck	26 feet (7.9 m)	Diesel	308	LHS = Lightweight Horizontal engine, Short
LHL	1968	Single deck	36 feet (11 m)	Diesel	174	LHL = Lightweight Horizontal engine, Long

=== Engines ===
Bristol made their own petrol engines to power their chassis. Until 1929 these were all four-cylinder, but in that year a six-cylinder model was added to the range to power the new C and D models. The C failed to get past the prototype stage, but the D was joined in 1931 by the G and J which also used Bristol's six-cylinder JW engine.

Bristol first offered a diesel-engined chassis in 1933. This was a JO single deck fitted with a Gardner five-cylinder engine. The GO double deck soon followed, but the petrol-engined J and G versions remained in the product range until 1936. Bristol continued to source its diesel engines from Gardner and other suppliers. In 1938 they began to develop their own but a production model was not ready until after World War II. The 8.14-litre AVW engine was available in 1946 and an LSW horizontal version was produced for the LS integral single deck in 1950. Larger 8.9-litre BVW engines appeared in 1957. More than 4,000 diesel engines were eventually produced.

=== Bodies ===
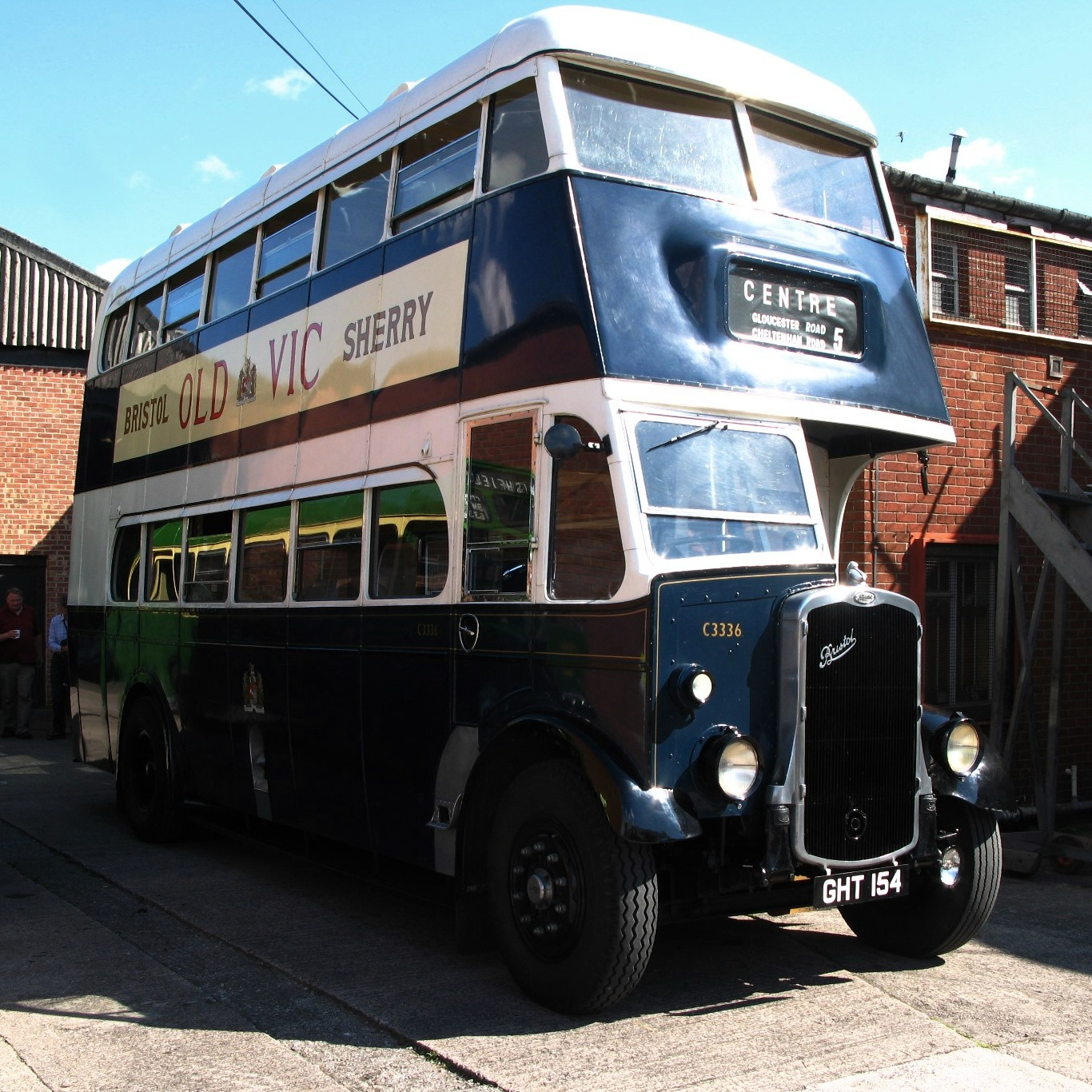
A Bristol K with a 1940 Bristol body

Bristol Tramways initially built bus and truck bodies at their Brislington Body Works which was on the same site as the Brislington tram depot. Low demand for new aircraft following World War I saw some bus and lorry bodies built in the aircraft factory at Filton, where the first bus chassis had been built.

Most early Bristol chassis (and some of the few chassis that the company bought from others) had their bodies built by Bristol Tramways, but by the late 1930s most other operators were having bodies for their Bristol chassis built elsewhere. One such outside coach factory was ECW in Lowestoft where they had been building bodies on Bristol chassis for United Automobile Services and other operators since 1929. Bristol Tramways even had a batch of K5Gs bodied by ECW in 1938.

After World War II Bristol's old angular body designs became more like the contemporary, more rounded ECW designs. After nationalisation ECW built bodies for most of Bristol's output. In 1955 it was decided that body production at Brislington would cease. The designs for the HA lorry cab were handed over to Longwell Green Coachworks, a company based near Bristol. All work had been transferred there by 28 May 1956.

=== Other products ===
In October 1913 a mobile workshop was built to repair aircraft in the field. A 'large bus body' was equipped with an electric generator which powered a lathe, bandsaw, drills, shaping machine, grindstone and lights. One of the two drills was on a long lead so that it could be used outside the workshop. It was also equipped with work benches, furnace and anvil. It was driven to the Paris Aircraft Show. It was sold to the Royal Naval Air Service in 1914.

More than 1,000 aircraft were built at the Motor Constructional Works to supplement the work of the regular Bristol Aeroplane Company factory at Filton during World War I. Again during World War II Brislington was tasked with manufacturing products to support the war. The fuselages for 1,300 Bristol Beaufighters and 120 Bristol Buckinghams were built and sent to Filton for fitting out. It built gas producer equipment to enable buses and trucks to use anthracite as a fuel. It also produced aircraft and tank components, shells, searchlight generators and other military equipment.

Brislington product's became more diverse after nationalisation. Heavy goods vehicles were designed and built for British Road Services in both rigid eight-wheel and articulated form. A few bus chassis were also fitted out as lorries, as they had done since the earliest days of the factory. A prototype container transporter for British Railways and a light anti-aircraft gun carriage for the Ministry of Defence also made use of BCV's expertise in road vehicle manufacture.

Bristol provided the chassis for two railbuses in 1958. Each used a Gardner 112 horsepower (84 kW) engine and a hydraulic automatic transmission. The bodywork was built by ECW. They were used on branch lines in Scotland, but no further orders were placed and the pair were withdrawn and scrapped in 1966.

== See also ==
- Bristol Cars
