= Bristol VR =

British rear-engined double-decker bus chassis

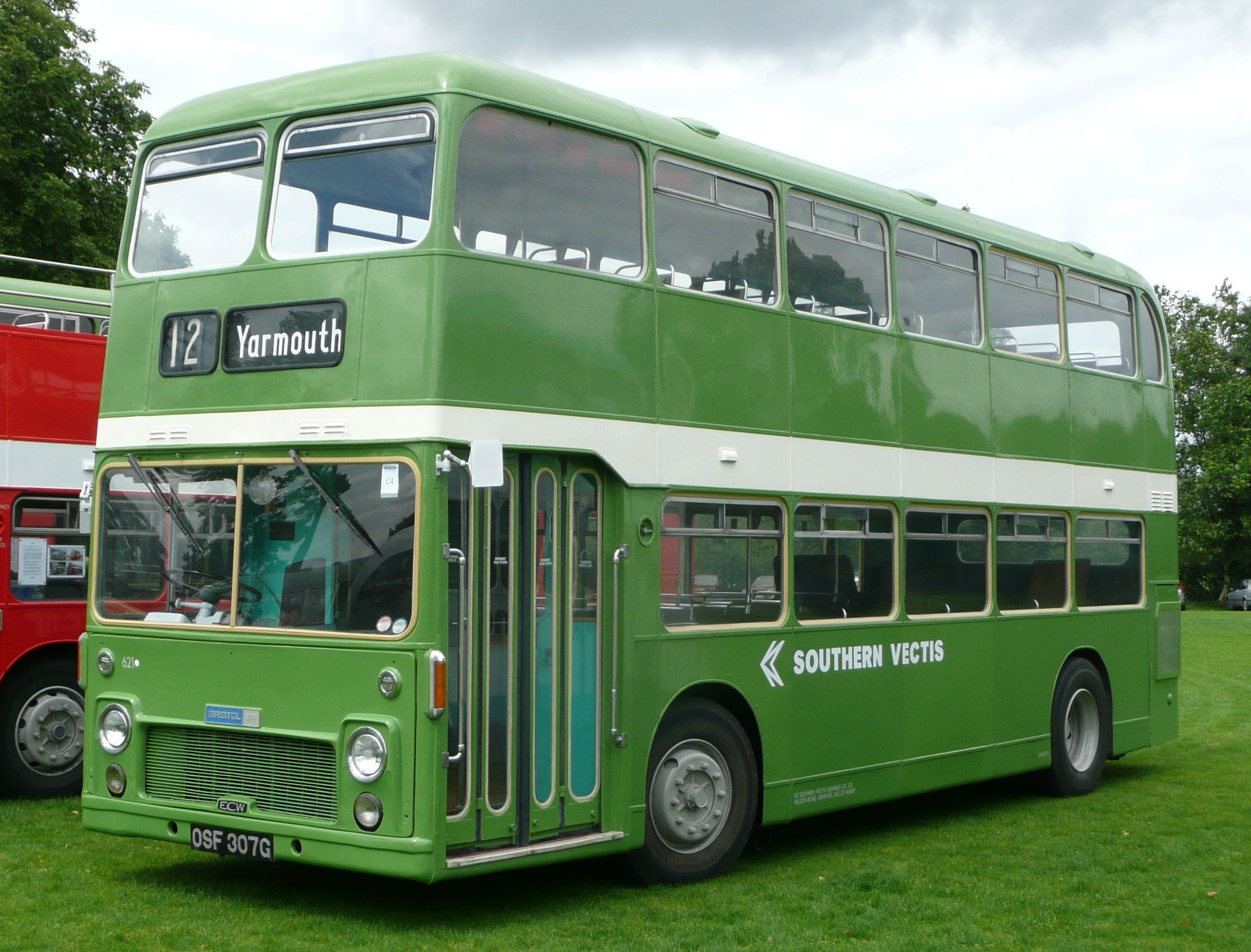
- Preserved Southern Vectis Eastern Coach Works bodied Bristol VRT/SL6G (Series 1) in July 2008

Overview
- Manufacturer: Bristol Commercial Vehicles
- Production: 1966–1981

Body and chassis
- Doors: 1 or 2
- Floor type: Step entrance

Powertrain
- Engine: Gardner 6LX; Gardner 6LXB; Gardner 6LXC; Leyland 510 8.2l Leyland 501; Leyland 680
- Capacity: 70-83 seated
- Transmission: Self-Changing Gears 4 or 5-speed semi-automatic

Dimensions
- Length: 31 ft 2 in (9.50 m) to 34 ft 9.3 in (10.60 m)
- Width: 8 ft 2.4 in (2.50 m)
- Height: 13 ft 8 in (4.17 m) and 14 ft 6 in (4.42 m)

The Bristol VR was a rear-engined double-decker bus chassis which was manufactured by Bristol Commercial Vehicles as a competitor to the Leyland Atlantean and Daimler Fleetline.

== Development ==
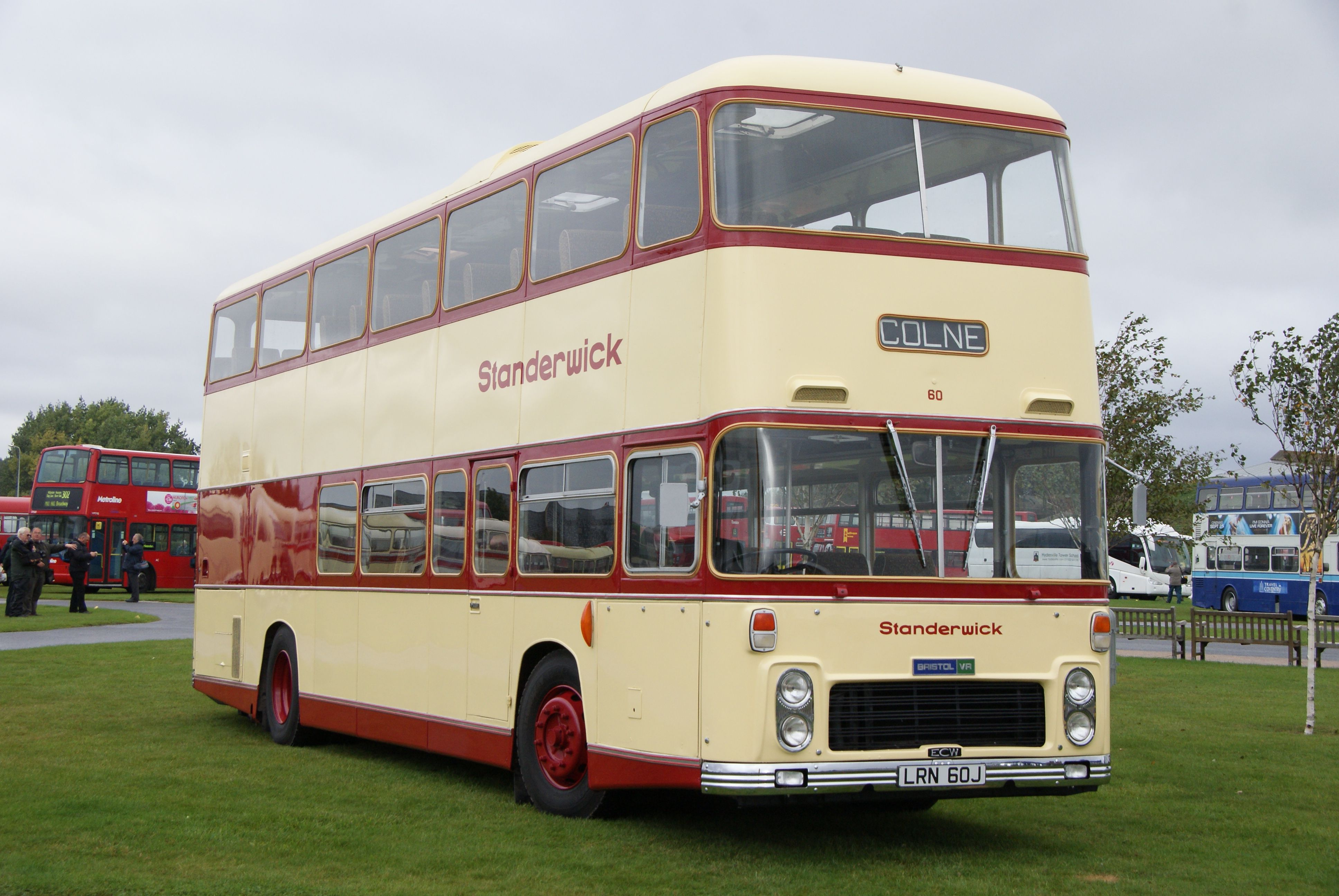
Preserved Standerwick Eastern Coach Works bodied VRL/LH2 coach in September 2010

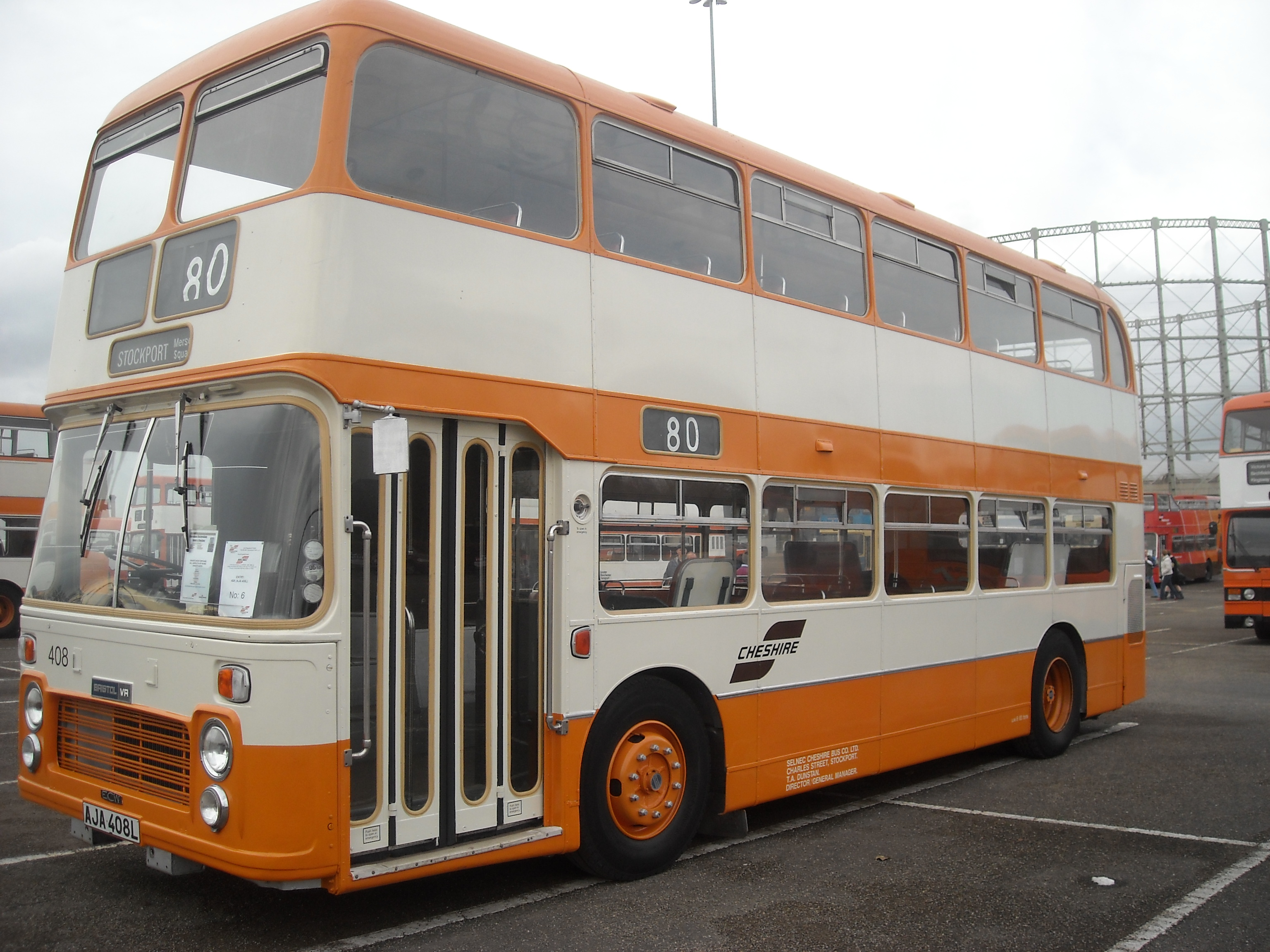
Preserved SELNEC Passenger Transport Executive Eastern Coach Works bodied VRT/SL2 (Series 2) in October 2009

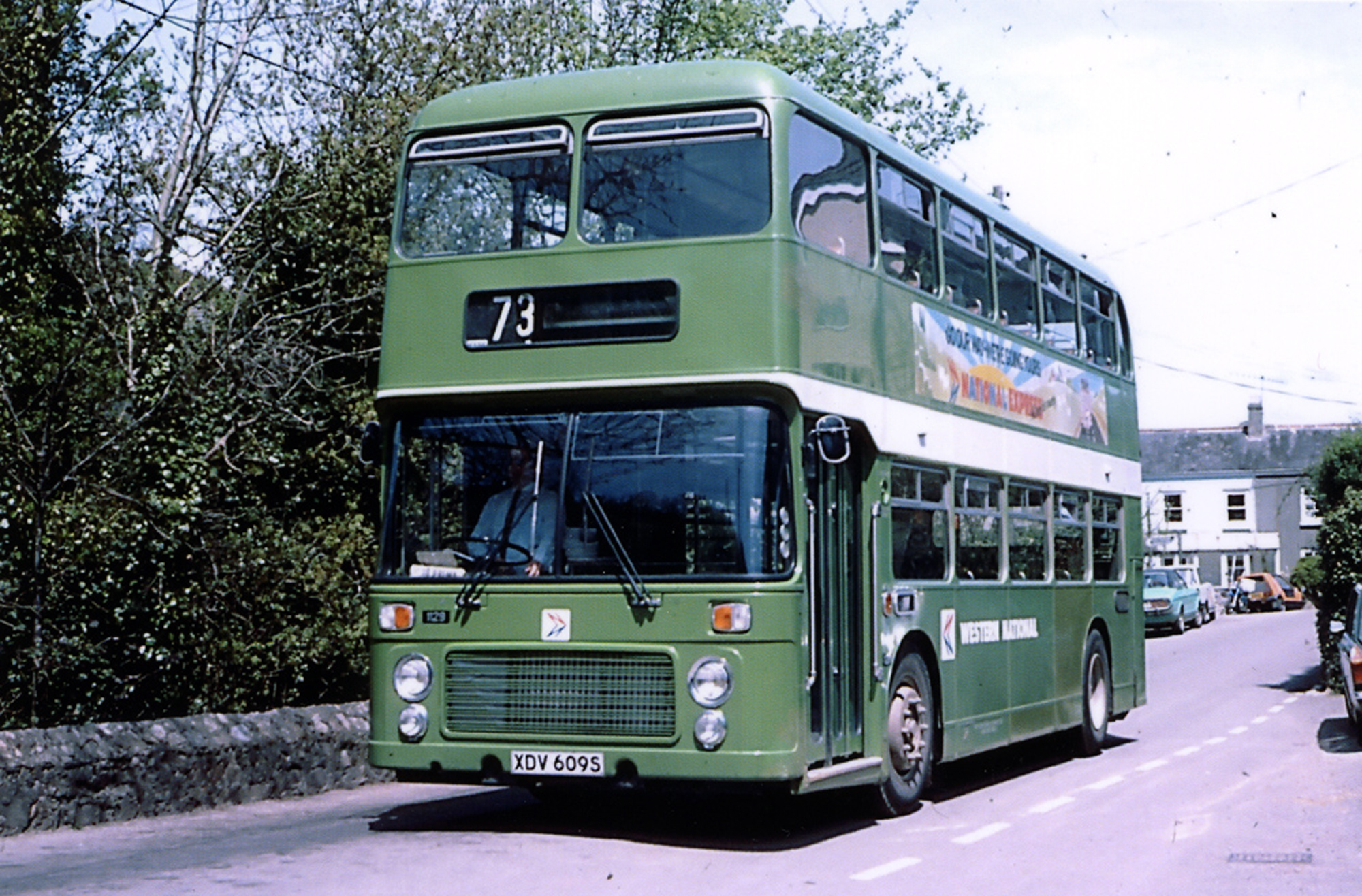
Western National Eastern Coach Works bodied Bristol VRT/SL3 (Series 3) in Saltash in May 1979

The Bristol VR was originally designed for single-deck or double-deck bodywork. The design featured a longitudinal mounted engine set behind the rear offside wheels, rather than the more typical transverse layout. A choice of Gardner 6LX or 6LW engines or the Leyland O.600 engine were to be available. The transmission was a semi-automatic unit by Self-Changing Gears. Originally intended to be designated the Bristol N-type, the chassis became known as the Bristol VR, an abbreviation for Vertical Rear, a reference to the layout of the engine. Two lengths were available, 32 ft 9 in (9.98 m) and 36 ft (11 m), and these were designated VRS and VRL respectively. A drop-centre rear axle and low frame were employed to keep the height of the vehicle down.

Two prototypes were built in spring 1966, and were shown at the 1966 Earls Court Motor Show. This was the first show at which Bristol could exhibit since 1948, their products being available to the open market again. The prototypes had 80-seat bodies by Eastern Coach Works (ECW) and entered service with Central SMT and Bristol Omnibus Company.

In July 1967 Bristol introduced a new version, the VRT, with a more conventional transverse-engined layout. The chassis was only available as a double-decker. There was also a choice of two frame heights. The longitudinal mounted version remained, and became known as the VRL. However, in July 1968 the British government introduced a grant intended to modernise the British bus fleets, and speed-up the introduction of one-man operation. The standard specification for the grant required a transverse rear-engined vehicle, with the result that few VRLs were produced.

== Production ==
The first production vehicles entered service with Eastern Scottish, a member of the Scottish Bus Group, in December 1968. Almost immediately, problems were experienced with the transmission and overheating of the engine, problems similar to those experienced by early versions of the Leyland Atlantean and Daimler Fleetline. A large number of the initial production versions entered service with the Scottish Bus Group. Continued reliability issues resulted in 1973 in the exchange, on a one-for-one basis, of 91 Bristol VRTs from Central SMT, Eastern Scottish and Western SMT for front-engined Bristol Lodekka FLF6Gs from the National Bus Company, a majority of these being sent from Eastern Counties.

A revision of the vehicle, the Series 2, was introduced in 1970, with changes including a replacement of the single-piece wraparound engine compartment door with a 3-piece version with a lift-up rear section and swing-out sides. In 1974, the Series 3 was introduced, with the main changes being to the engine compartment, to keep in line with new noise legislation. The most visible change was to move the ventilation grills from alongside the engine to higher up, just below the top deck windows, connected to the engine compartment by trunking, plus the removal of the grilles from the rear engine compartment door. The short, lowheight version became the standard vehicle for the National Bus Company. The VRT remained in production until 1981, by which time 4,531 had been built. The Leyland Olympian, the successor to the VR, shared many similarities to the Series 3 VR, although with updates such as air suspension.

The later Bristol VRs remained in service with many independent bus operators and some major bus companies across the United Kingdom until the late 2000s: East Yorkshire Motor Services, having amassed a total of 150 new and second-hand VRs, withdrew their last closed top examples in 2004; Wilts & Dorset withdrew their last examples in 2007, with some continuing operating until 2009 with subsidiary Damory Coaches, and First Devon & Cornwall withdrew their last closed top VRs in December 2006. First Hampshire & Dorset operated one VR on an open-top service between Weymouth and Portland Bill until September 2010, while Arriva Buses Wales operated a VR for a summertime open-top tour of Llandudno and Conwy.

=== Chassis types ===
The chassis code of a Bristol VR is very logical, and reveals a lot of information regarding the vehicle. The format is VRw/xxx/yyy, where w is the engine orientation (T or L: transverse or longitudinal, respectively. The prototype chassis carried an X here, i.e. VRX), xxx reflects the chassis details, and yyy the engine, e.g. VRT/SL3/6LXB is a short, low, Series 3 with a transverse Gardner 6LXB engine. The VRT/SL3/6LXB with ECW bodywork is the most common variant of the VR.

The chassis types are as follows:

- LH - Long/High; Series 1 (note: VRLs were only of the form VRL/LH)
- LH2 - Long/High; Series 2
- LL - Long/Low; Series 1; built primarily for Scottish Omnibuses
- LL2 - Long/Low; Series 2; built primarily for Reading Transport
- LL3 - Long/Low; Series 3
- SL - Short/Low; Series 1
- SL2 - Short/Low; Series 2
- SL3 - Short/Low; Series 3

Engines:

- 6LX - Gardner 6LX
- 6LXB - Gardner 6LXB (Gearbox: Type RV90 5-speed semi-automatic)
- 501 - Leyland 501
- 680 - Leyland 0680

== Bodies ==
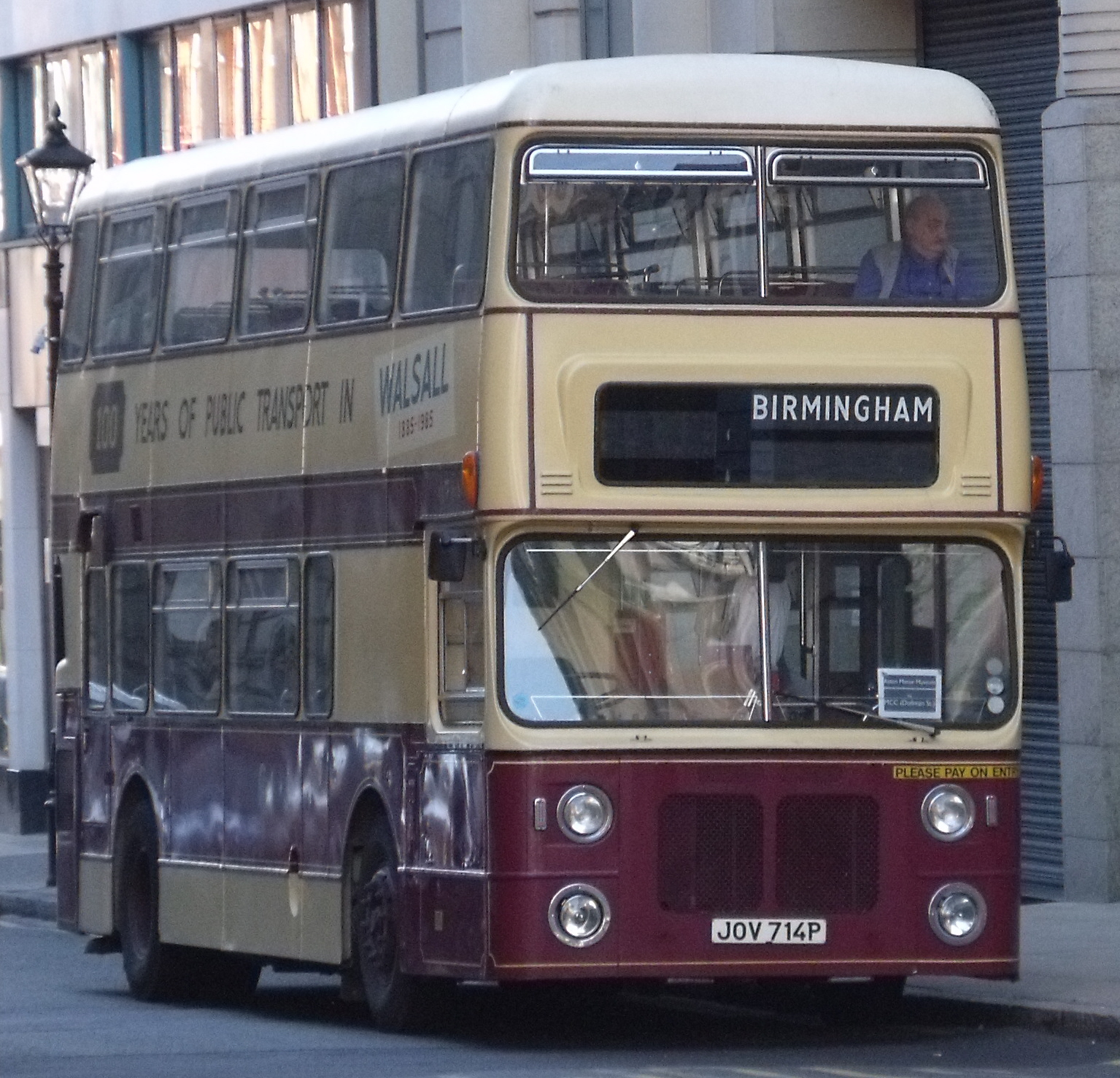
Preserved West Midlands Passenger Transport Executive Metro Cammell Weymann bodied Bristol VRT/SL2 in May 2011

Like most Bristol buses, most VRs were bodied by Eastern Coach Works. However, some were bodied by Walter Alexander, East Lancs, Metro Cammell Weymann, Northern Counties and Willowbrook of Loughborough. Willowbrook bodied VRs for various customers like East Kent, Northern and Cardiff. Notable users of the VR outside of the National Bus Company (NBC) included the West Midlands Passenger Transport Executive, who took 200 on MCW bodies in 1970s and Liverpool Corporation Transport/Merseyside Transport, who together took approximately 120 in total all on East Lancs bodies in separate batches in the late 1960s and mid 1970s. Other large users included the Scottish Bus Group, independents such as A Mayne & Son, and municipal bus companies including Burnley & Pendle, Cleveland Transit, City of Cardiff, Lincoln City Transport, Northampton Transport, Reading Transport and Tayside Regional Council.

The ECW body was distinctive for its rounded rear upper deck, a feature carried over from the ECW bodywork on the Bristol Lodekka and having its roots in ECW's styling on the Bristol K-type in the 1940s. The vehicles were typically constructed in the two heights set in the bus grant standards, 13 ft 8 in (4.17 m) and 14 ft 6 in (4.42 m), the latter mostly being bought by Bristol Omnibus, Ribble, Northern and Maidstone & District. Other versions were built, including 13 ft 5 in (4.09 m) for City of Oxford Motor Services and the 14 ft 2 in (4.32 m) height allowed under later versions of the grant specification along with the 13 ft 10 in (4.22 m) convertible open-toppers for companies such as Hants & Dorset, Southdown and Devon General.

== Famous buses ==
- Dutch Orange Bus
