= United Automobile Services =

Bus operator in North East England

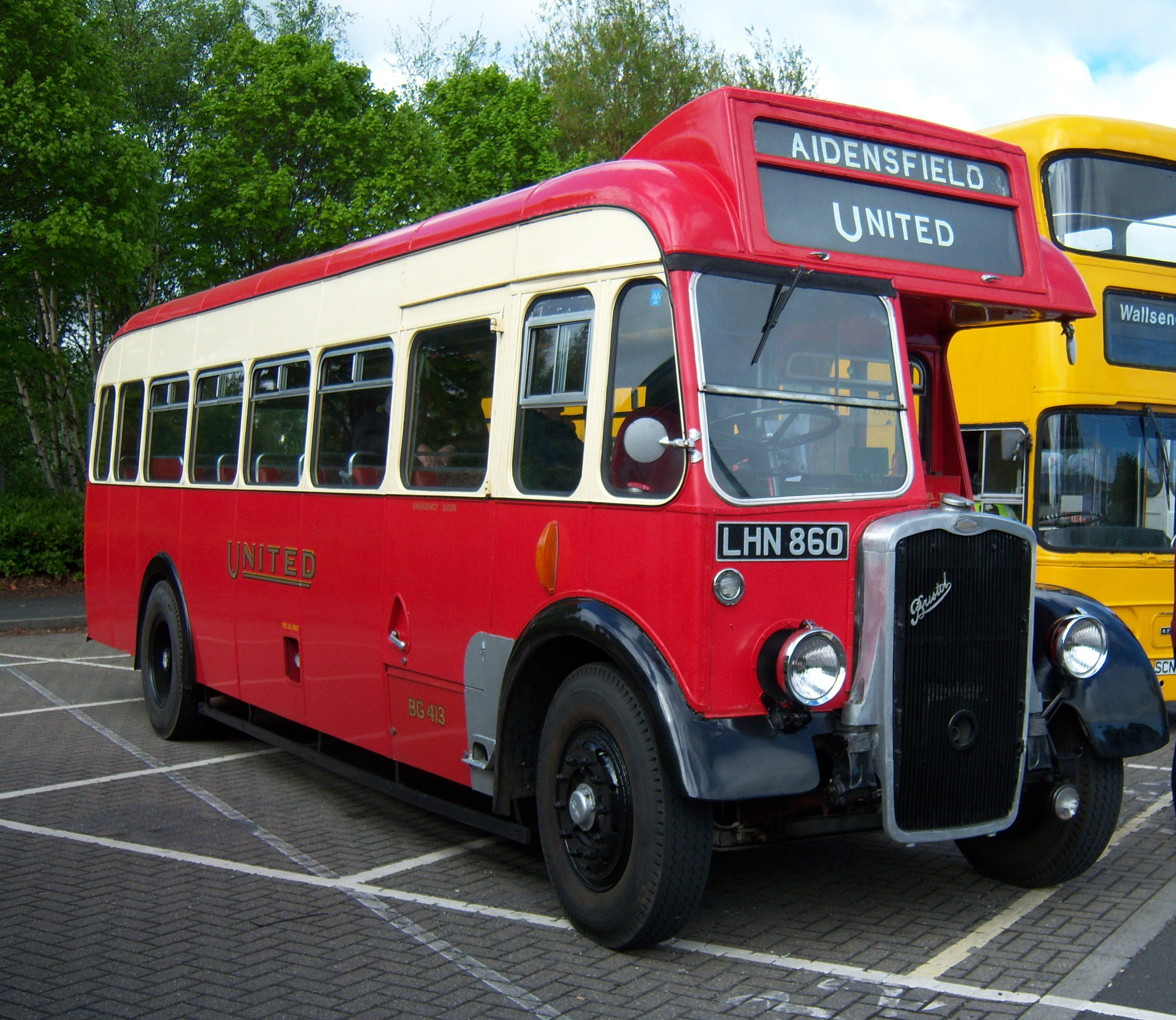
- Preserved ECW bodied Bristol L5G at the 2009 Gateshead Metrocentre bus rally
- Founded: May 1912; 114 years ago
- Ceased operation: November 1997; 28 years ago
- Headquarters: Darlington, County Durham, England
- Service area: County Durham; Cumbria; Northumberland; North Yorkshire; Tyne and Wear
- Service type: Bus and coach
- Fleet: 760 (December 1985)

United Automobile Services was a bus company which operated local and regional bus services in County Durham, Cumbria, Northumberland, North Yorkshire and Tyne & Wear, England. It provided bus services across a wide geographical area, stretching from the border town of Berwick-upon-Tweed in the north, Filey in the south, and Carlisle in the west.

== History ==
United Automobile Services was founded in Lowestoft, Suffolk in May 1912 with two routes; one route operated in Suffolk, while the other operating over 200 miles away in County Durham between Bishop Auckland and Durham. During the 1920s, the company expanded into Lincolnshire and Norfolk as well as across County Durham, Northumberland and North Yorkshire.

United formed East Midland Motor Services in 1920 when one of their managers, W.T. Underwood, was sent to Clowne in Derbyshire to set up a bus company in his own name. W. T. Underwood, Ltd later became East Midland.

In 1929, control of United passed to the Tilling Group and the London and North Eastern Railway. and in 1931, agreements were signed by the new owners to split United's East Anglian operations into a separate company, the Eastern Counties Omnibus Company.

United was nationalised when the Tilling Group sold its bus operating interests to the British Transport Commission in 1948. After passing to the Transport Holding Company (THC) following the BTC's abolition under the provisions of the Transport Act 1962, United was later among the THC operators that became part of the National Bus Company (NBC) on 1 January 1969, following the passage of the Transport Act 1968.

=== Deregulation ===
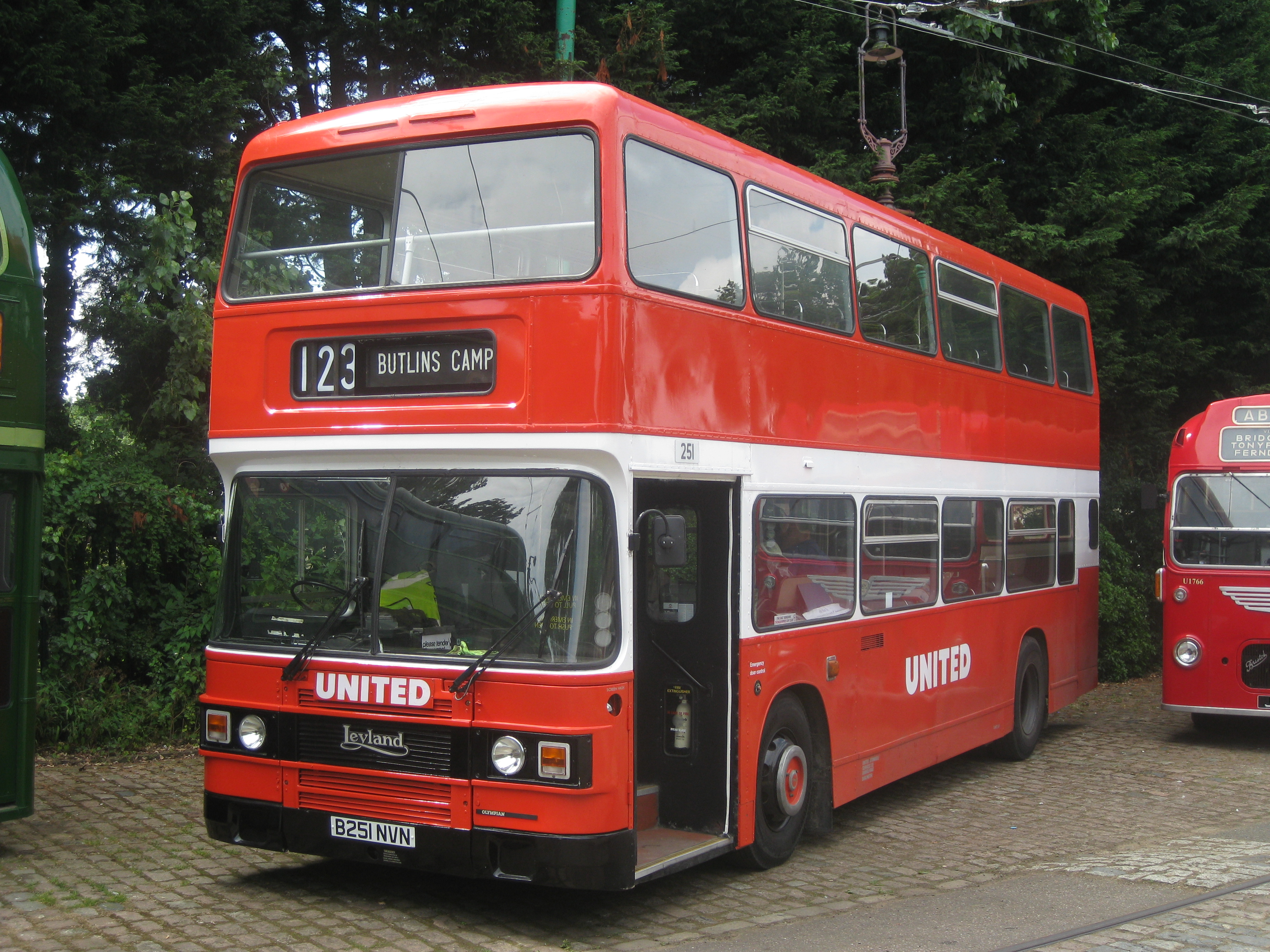
Preserved ECW bodied Leyland Olympian in post-deregulation livery at the East Anglia Transport Museum in July 2017

Prior to the deregulation of bus services on 26 October 1986 and ensuing breakup of the National Bus Company, United's operations in Northumberland and Scarborough were separated by the NBC into two new companies, Northumbria Motor Services and Scarborough & District. The Scarborough & District operations were transferred to East Yorkshire Motor Services, while Northumbria Services Services was sold by the NBC to a management buyout team in November 1987. On 2 December 1987, the remainder of United was sold to Caldaire Holdings, resulting in the formation of a new division named Caldaire North East.

Immediately following deregulation, a number of Dodge and Mercedes-Benz minibuses were purchased by United for use on local services. Some routes replaced existing 'big bus' services, with others operating on brand new services, which were highly competitive with existing services operated by local authorities – notably in Darlington, sparking the Darlington Bus War, and in Hartlepool. Most of these minibuses were branded with names such as Darlington Roadranger, Hartlepool Hoppa, Peterlee Panther and Whitby Clipper, amongst others. These new minibus services ran hail and ride systems around housing estates and proved both successful and controversial for United, most notably in Darlington, where the minibus network was hugely expanded to compete against Darlington Transport Company, Your Bus – an independent formed by ex-United employees – and from 1994, Stagecoach Busways.

United's National Express and private coaching operations were split off into a new company, Durham Travel Services, formed through a management buyout in 1988, and United's operating area was further reduced in 1990 when operations in Cleveland and Middlesbrough were separated and renamed Tees & District. In March 1990, Caldaire North East purchased Blue Bird Securities, the holding company for Trimdon Motor Services of Trimdon and Teesside Motor Services of Stockton-on-Tees. While the Teesside Motor Services brand was retained as a Caldaire North East subsidiary based out of a depot in Stockton-on-Tees, Trimdon Motor Services was merged into United, with the Trimdon garage closed, 13 buses disposed of and 20 jobs lost amid the reallocation of services and staff to other United depots.

By October 1990, however, the former Trimdon Motor Services operations began experiencing driver shortages, and Caldaire's purchase of the company was referred to the Monopolies and Mergers Commission (MMC) by members of Easington District Council. After the MMC concluded in February 1991 that the deal to take over Trimdon Motor Services was not against the public interest, Secretary of State for Trade and Industry Peter Lilley overruled the MMC ruling and told Caldaire to sell Trimdon Motor Services. In 1992, with Caldaire's management feeling that expansion in the North East of England was putting strain on its core West Yorkshire operations, Caldaire Holdings was split into two companies, with United, Tees & District and Teesside Motor Services joining garage company C A Hartley under the management of the new Westcourt Group, later renamed North East Bus.

North East Bus was sold in 1994 to West Midlands Travel, who then sold those operations in 1996 to the Cowie Group. Cowie later sold United's Ripon operations to the Harrogate Bus Company. Most of the remaining operations are today part of Arriva North East.

== Operating areas ==
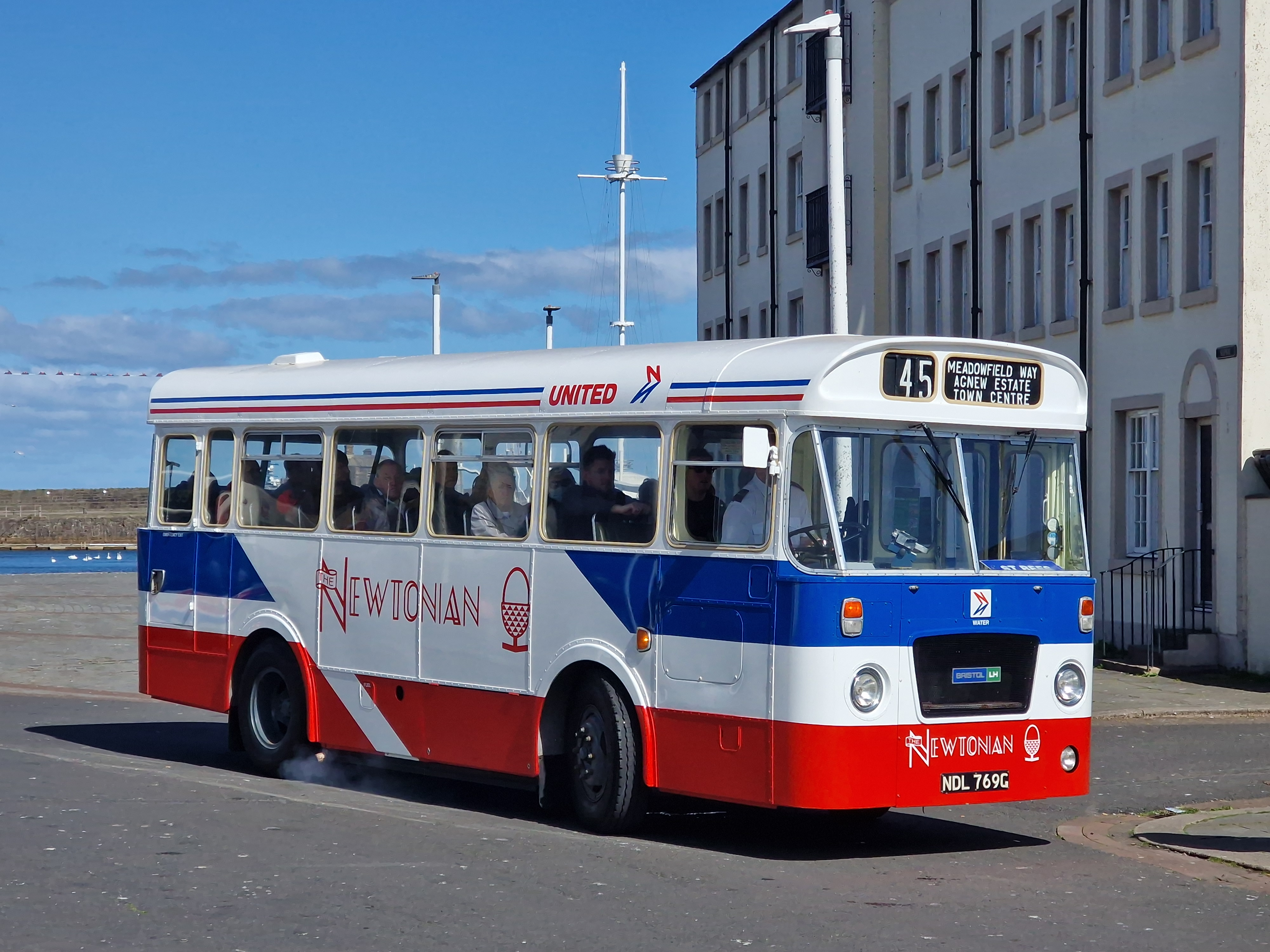
Preserved ECW bodied Bristol LH in 'The Newtonian' route branding in May 2025

United Automobile Services ran vehicles from its head office in Darlington and garages across their area, including Durham, Hartlepool, Whitby and Peterlee amongst others. In the 1985 official fleet book, United's operations were shown as split into the following three operating areas:

=== Northumberland ===
==== Depots and outstations ====
- Allenheads (Outstation) – The Barn
- Alnwick – Lisburn Street
- Ashington – Lintonville Terrace
- Berwick – Marygate
- Blyth – Bridge Street
- Hexham – Burn Lane
- Morpeth – Dark Lane
- Newcastle (Gallowgate) – Gallowgate
- Newcastle (Jesmond) – Portland Terrace
- Rothbury – High Street
- Seahouses (Outstation) – Public Car Park
- Whitley Bay – Park Avenue
- Wooler – South Road

=== Durham ===
==== Depots and outstations ====
- Barnard Castle (Outstation) – Thorngate
- Bishop Auckland – Morland Street
- Darlington – Bus Station, Feethams
- Durham – Waddington Street
- Hawes (Outstation) – Gayle Lane
- Newton Aycliffe (Outstation) – Ridgeway
- Northallerton – Brompton Road
- Peterlee – Davy Drive
- Richmond – Station Yard
- Ripon – Park Street
- Shotton Colliery – Flemming Field (1930s)
- Sunderland – Toward Road

=== Cleveland ===
==== Depots and outstations ====
- Hartlepool – Clarence Road
- Loftus – Whitby Road
- Middlesbrough – Union Street
- Pickering (Outstation) – Thornton Road
- Redcar – Regent Street
- Scarborough – Vernon Road
- Stokesley – North Road
- Whitby – Upgang Lane

=== Cumbria ===
- Carlisle – Lowther Street – routes east of Carlisle towards Newcastle and Carlisle Town Hall to Botcherby estate. Transferred to Ribble Motor Services in 1969.

== Fleet ==
As of December 1985, United Automobile Services' fleet consisted of 760 buses and coaches. Most of United's vehicle fleet consisted of Bristols with Gardner engines and Eastern Coach Works bodies, the LH and VR being common vehicles. Another vehicle commonly used was the Leyland National.

United were one of only three operators, and the only English operator, to buy the Bristol REMH 12-metre (39 ft) coach chassis. These 35 vehicles, which had Plaxton Panorama Elite III 49-seat coach bodywork, were delivered between 1971 and 1975.
