= Eastern Coach Works =

British bus body building company, 1920–1987

Coordinates: 52°28′39″N 1°44′03″E

- Industry: Bus manufacturing
- Founded: 1920
- Founder: United Automobile Services
- Defunct: January 1987
- Headquarters: Lowestoft, United Kingdom
- Parent: British Leyland

Eastern Coach Works was a bus and train bodybuilder based in Lowestoft, England.

== History ==
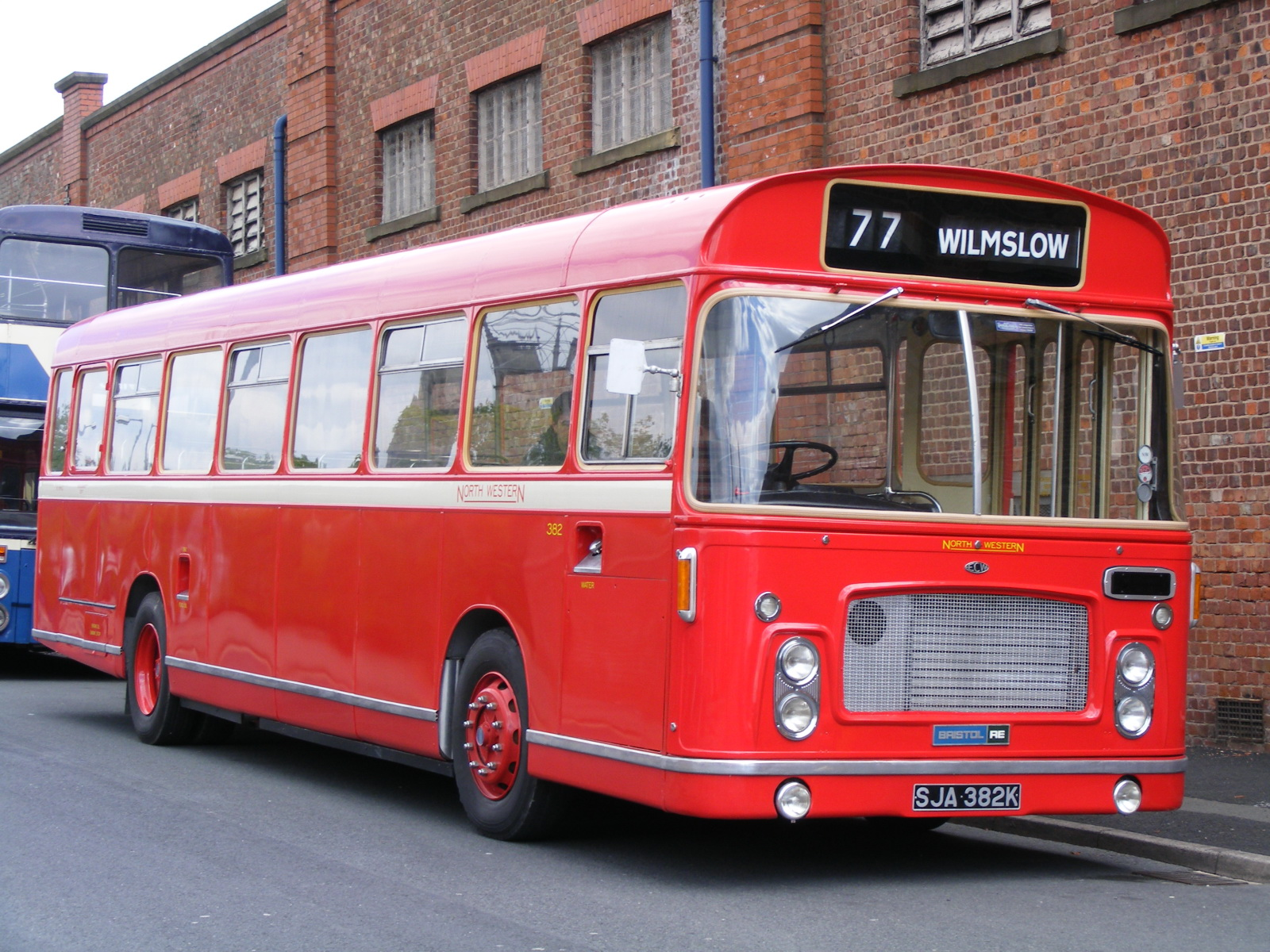
A preserved Bristol RE with ECW bodywork at the Manchester Museum of Transport

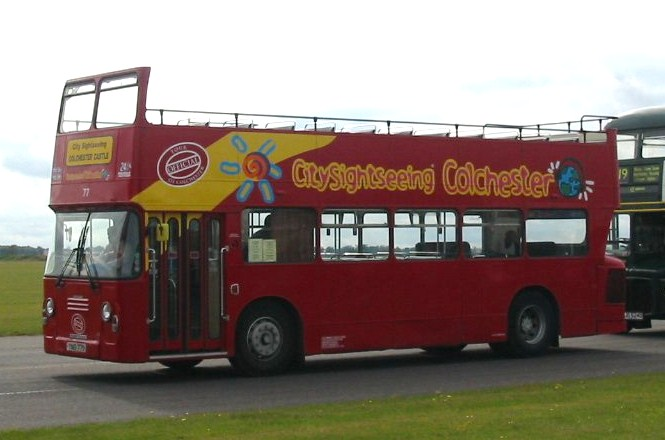
A Leyland Atlantean AN68/1R with ECW bodywork, built in 1978 (YNO 77S) for Colchester Borough Transport, later converted to an open top bus for City Sightseeing operation in Colchester

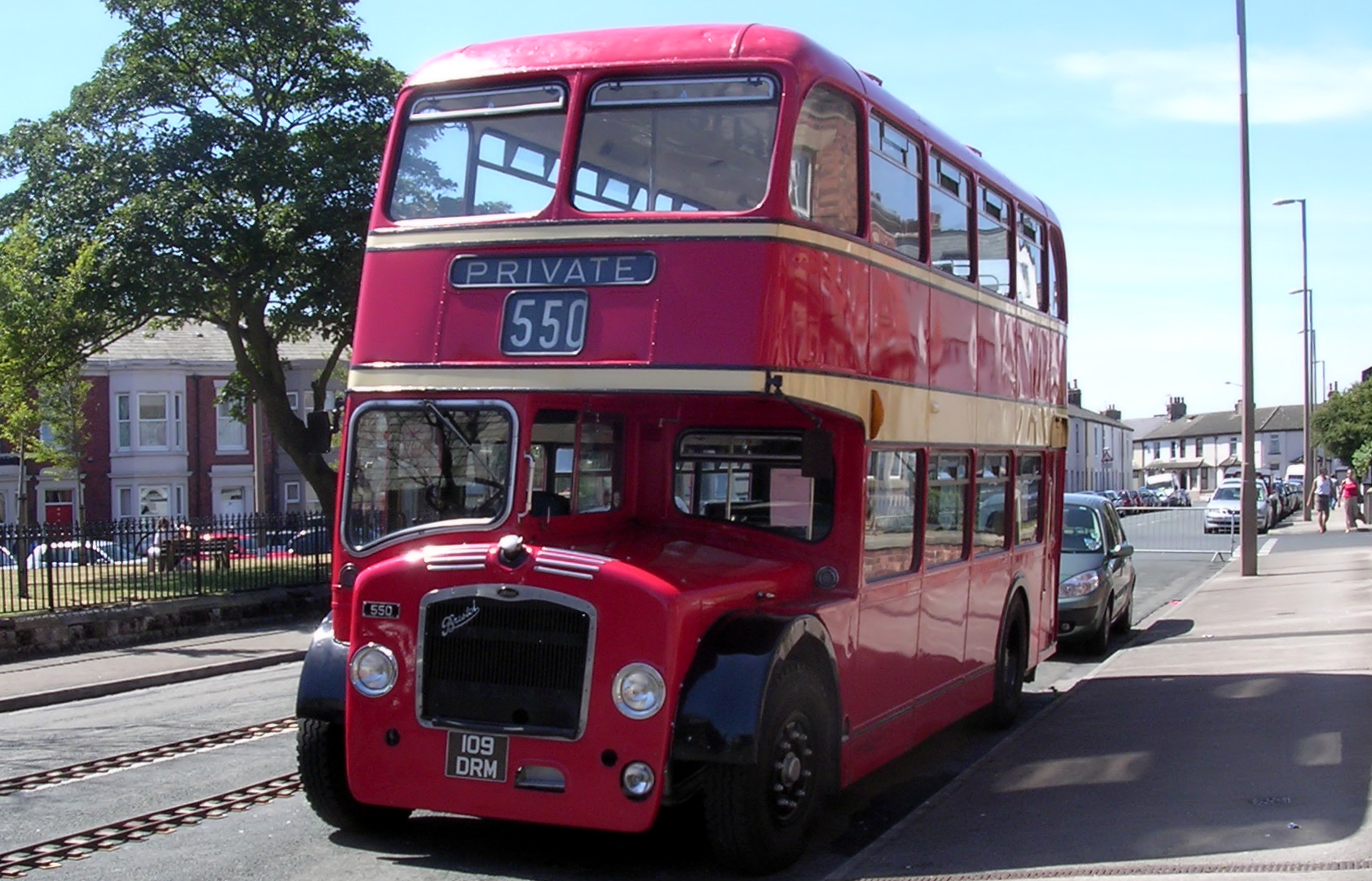
A Bristol Lodekka with ECW bodywork

The origins of Eastern Coach Works (ECW) can be traced back to 1912, when United Automobile Services was founded in Lowestoft to run bus services. United began a coach building business at the Lowestoft site in 1920. In 1931, the East Anglian operations of United were hived off into a new company, Eastern Counties Omnibus Company, and Eastern Counties inherited the coach works - now concentrating on building bus bodies, with a workforce of over 600 people. In July 1936, the coach works were separated into a new company, Eastern Coach Works Limited, which developed into the largest full-time employer in Lowestoft.

In May 1940, the factory received orders from the military authorities to cease production. It was thought that, following the outbreak of World War II, the East Coast would be the first target for an invading German army, so all wheeled vehicles were moved away from the site so that they did not fall into enemy hands. As a result of this, 950 staff were laid off with production shifted to Irthlingborough. By 1947, though, production was back to pre-war levels.

ECW was nationalised in 1947. For the next 18 years, its business consisted mainly of building bus bodies, which were mounted on Bristol chassis, for state-owned bus operators. In 1965, the state-owned Transport Holding Company sold a 25% share in ECW to Leyland Motors, which enabled ECW to sell to the private sector. During the 1960s, it was common to see a bare bus chassis being driven through town by a goggle-wearing driver, delivering the chassis for a body. In 1969, ECW became part of a 50/50 joint venture between the National Bus Company (successor to the Transport Holding Company) and British Leyland (successor to Leyland Motors).

The materials to build the buses came into the Coach works via Essex Road at the back of the factory, but the newly built buses were driven out of the big doors at the front. They drove down the short, narrow lane, with no pavements called Eastern Way, on their way to their new depot. Eastern Way used to be called Laundry Lane, but the name was changed to Eastern Way following the opening of Eastern Coach Works.

The joint venture came to an end in 1982, when British Leyland bought out NBC's shareholding. ECW closed in January 1987. The site was subsequently demolished to make way for the North Quay Retail Park, which opened in 1990. ECW was one of Lowestoft's largest employers, with around 1,200 staff at its peak.

== Products ==
ECW was probably best known for its close association with Bristol Commercial Vehicles. Amongst the Bristol buses most frequently bodied at Lowestoft were the:

- Bristol LH - a small, single deck bus (1970s)
- Bristol Lodekka - a front-engined double deck bus (1950s and 1960s)
- Bristol RE - a single deck bus (1960s and 1970s)
- Bristol VRT - a rear-engined double deck bus (1970s), successor to the Lodekka
- Leyland Olympian - a rear engined double deck bus (1980's) successor to Bristol VRT
