= Kernow (bus company) =

Bus company operating services in Cornwall, England

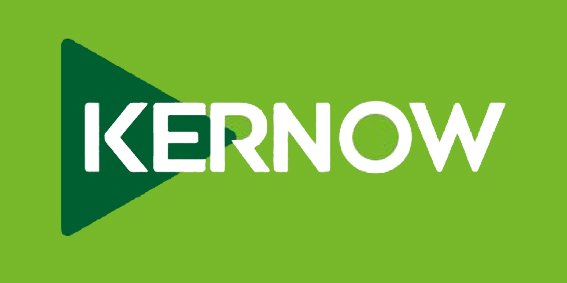

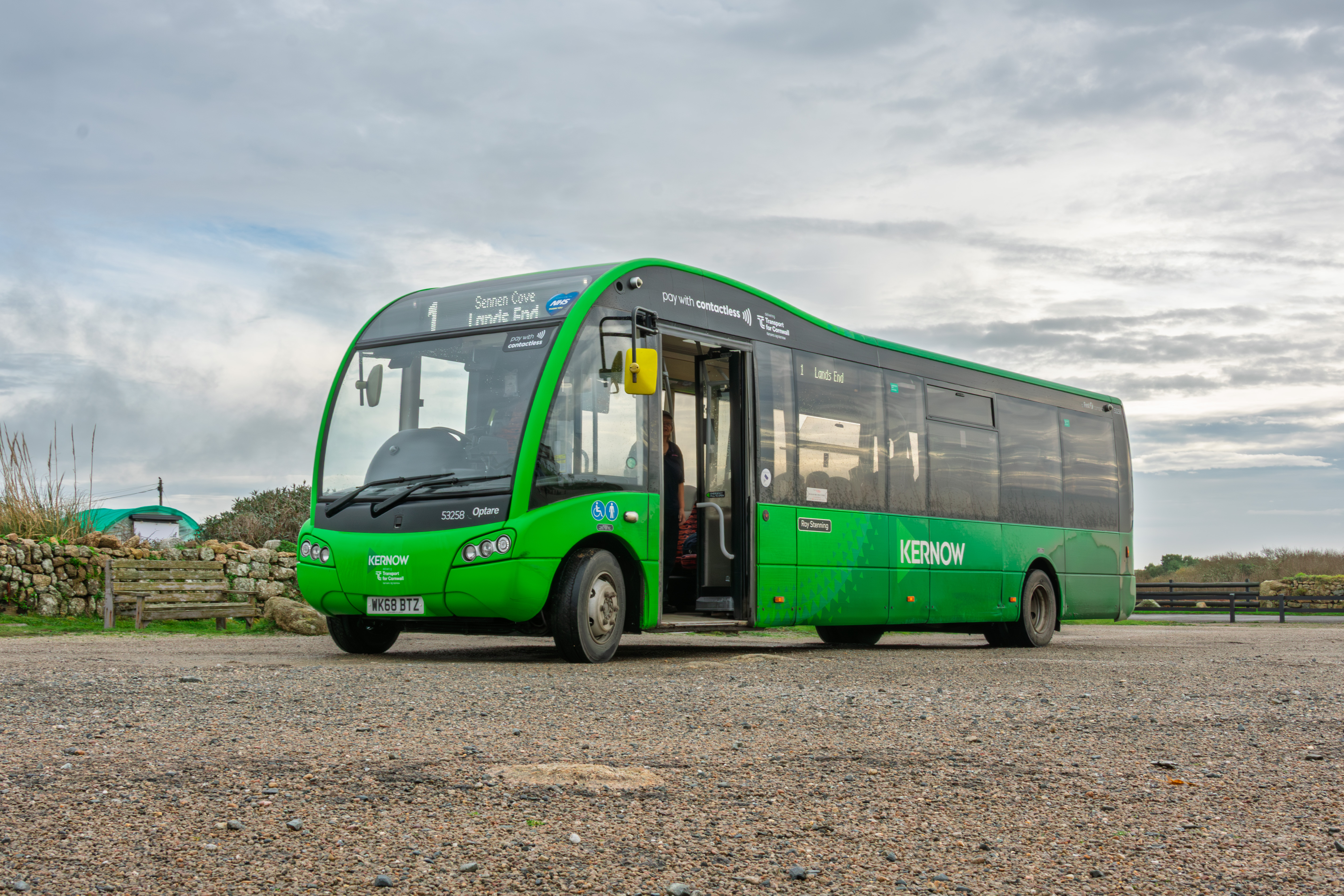
- Optare Solo SR at Land's End in November 2025
- Parent: First South West
- Ceased operation: 2024
- Headquarters: Camborne
- Service area: Mid and West Cornwall
- Service type: Bus services
- Operator: First South West

Kernow (also known as Kernow by First or First Kernow) was a brand used by FirstGroup for its buses in Cornwall, England. The buses were initially operated by its First Devon and Cornwall subsidiary and later by First South West. First stopped using local brands such as Kernow in 2024 and withdrew all local bus services in Cornwall in 2026.

== History ==
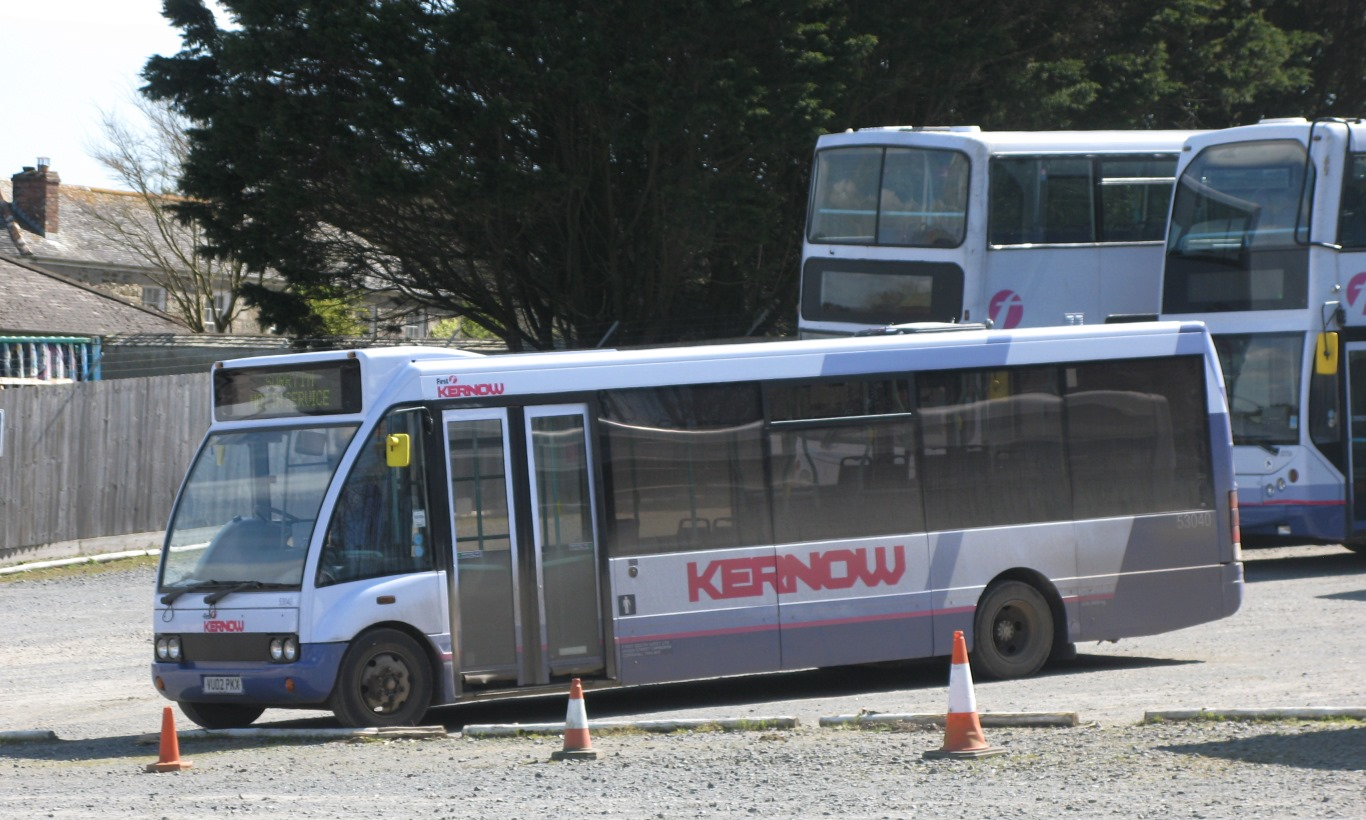
An Optare Solo in First Group livery with Kernow branding (Helston, 2016)

Kernow was created as a brand of First South West, which was formed from two previous operators: Western National (in Cornwall and South Devon) and Red Bus (in North Devon).

First purchased Truronian coaches in 2008 but the Truronian brand was retained for coach operations.

Cornwall Council announced on 6 January 2020 that it had awarded the entire tendered bus network in the county, except the Truro park & ride service, to the Go-Ahead Group from 1 April. The contract consists of 73 routes, which was roughly half of the First Kernow network at the start of 2020. First retained their commercially operated routes and the Truro park & ride contract.

FirstGroup announced in December 2024 that it was ending the use of local brands such as Kernow. It was to be phased out as buses and signs begun being replaced or repainted, however they ceased operating local bus services in Cornwall from 14 February 2026 due to decreasing passenger numbers which made it financially unviable to continue operating in the county.

== Routes ==
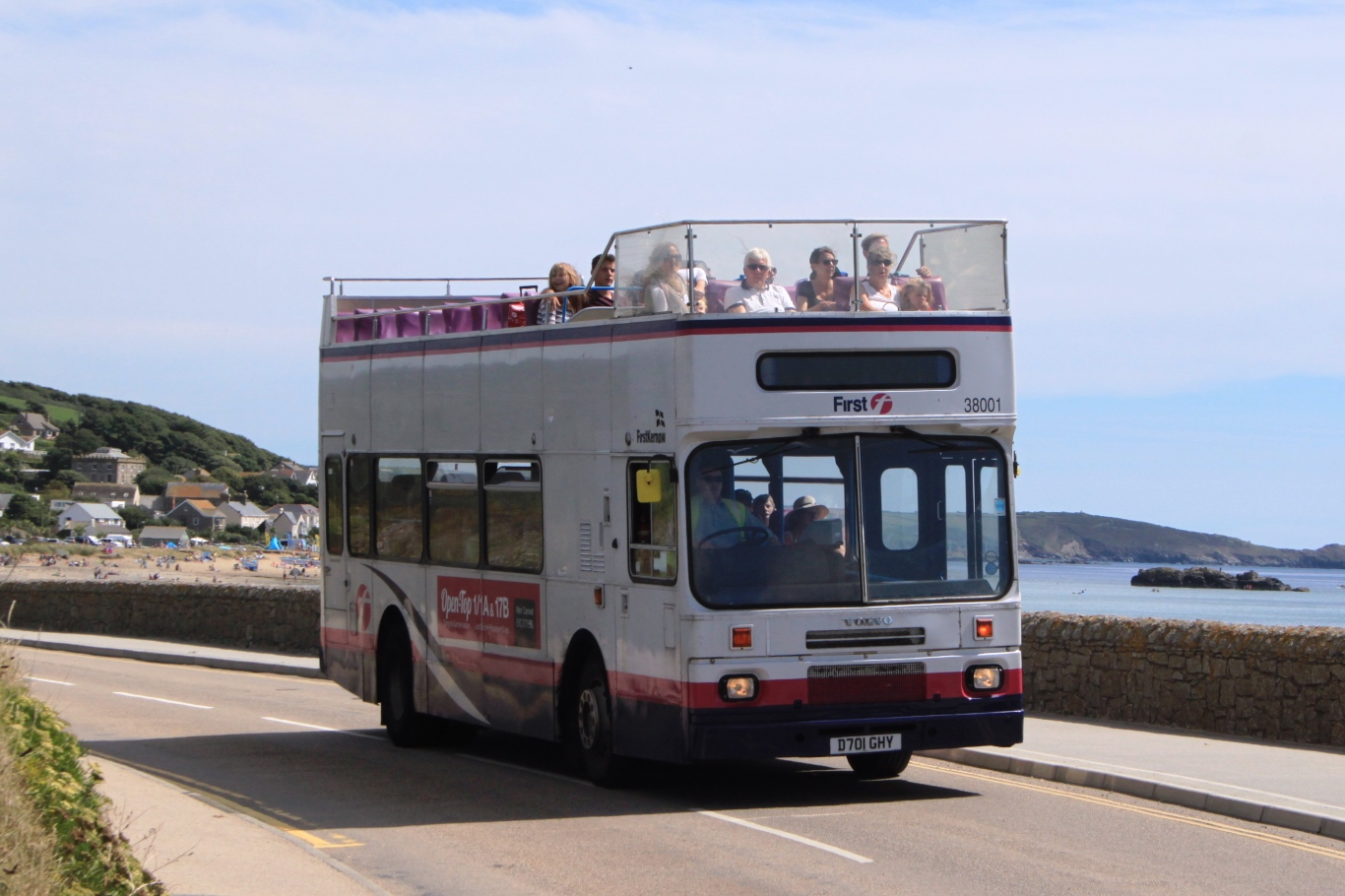
An Alexander RV-bodied Volvo B10M open top on the St Ives to Penzance route before it was branded as the 'Land's End Coaster' (Marazion, 2016)

Kernow routes initially covered mainly central and west Cornwall, west of an imaginary line connecting Camelford, Bodmin and Fowey, although two services continued along the north coast from Camelford as far as Bude. Most routes were interurban or rural in character, but there were local town services in some of the larger urban areas – Falmouth, Newquay, Penzance and St Austell. Kernow operated the park and ride service in Truro on behalf of Cornwall Council, as well as services between Truro, Redruth and the Falmouth University campuses in Falmouth and Penryn.

During the summer months until 2024, Kernow operated open top buses. The service was relaunched under the 'Coaster' brand in 2017. By 2022 Kernow operated four 'Coaster' branded open top bus routes in Cornwall: the 'Land's End Coaster' (Penzance – Marazion – St Ives Land’s End – Penzance circular); the 'Tin Coaster' (Penzance – Lower Boscawell); the 'Atlantic Coaster' (Newquay – Padstow); and the 'Falmouth Coaster' (Falmouth circular). First South West did not run any open top services in Cornwall in the 2025 summer season due to a drop in tourism, with services instead being operated by conventional buses with roofs.

Kernow took over some of Western Greyhound's routes following that company's sudden closure in March 2015, which included services to towns that had seen little or few Kernow services in recent years such as Newquay, Padstow, Perranporth and Wadebridge where nearly all services had been operated by Western Greyhound for some years.

Many rural routes were contracted from Cornwall Council until the Transport for Cornwall contract was given to Plymouth Citybus in March 2020. Routes operated by Kernow in 2021 were the branded services such as 'Tinner', 'Copper', 'Coaster', 'The Mousehole', and 'Sunseeker' along with the Falmouth University services and unbranded routes 17, 19, 24, 27 and 91 which were operated on a commercial basis. Truro College, Truro park and ride and some school routes also continued to run under contract. Kernow started the 'Daytripper' brand started in May 2021, initially for routes to the Eden Project but later extended to include 'Falmouth Coaster' and 'Discover Exeter' open top services and the 'Dartmoor Explorer'.

== Depots ==
The principal maintenance depot and headquarters were at Camborne Bus Station with a second in the Newquay area at Summercourt, which was acquired from Western Greyhound after that company had ceased to trade. The depots at Penzance and Truro also carried out some vehicle checks and minor maintenance.

=== Depots ===
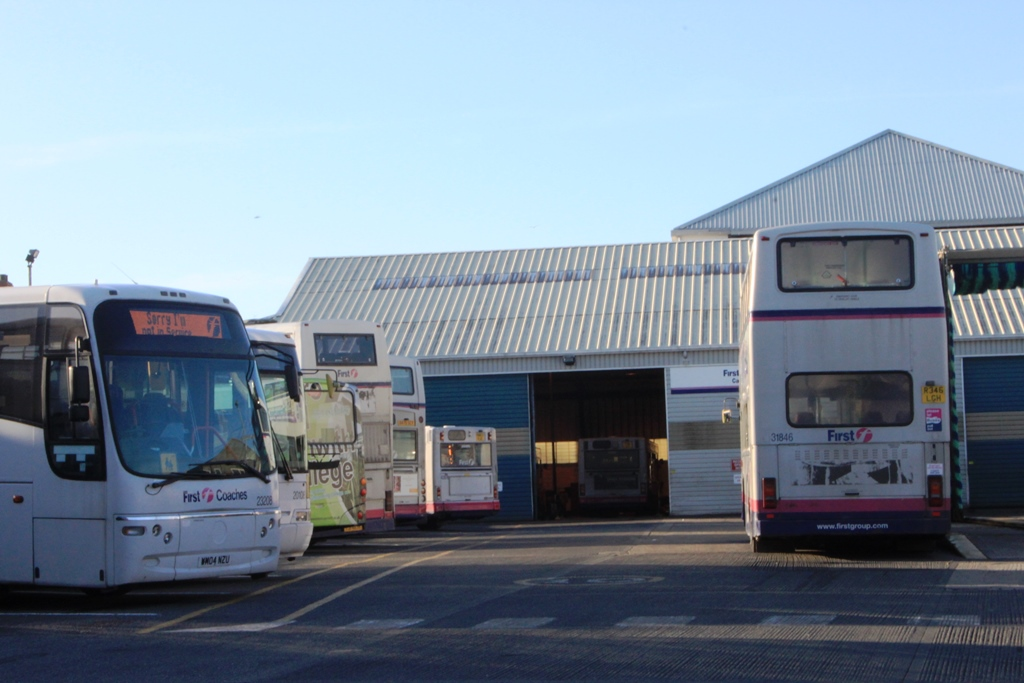
Camborne depot

- Camborne
- Penzance
- Summercourt (Newquay)
- Truro

=== Outstations ===
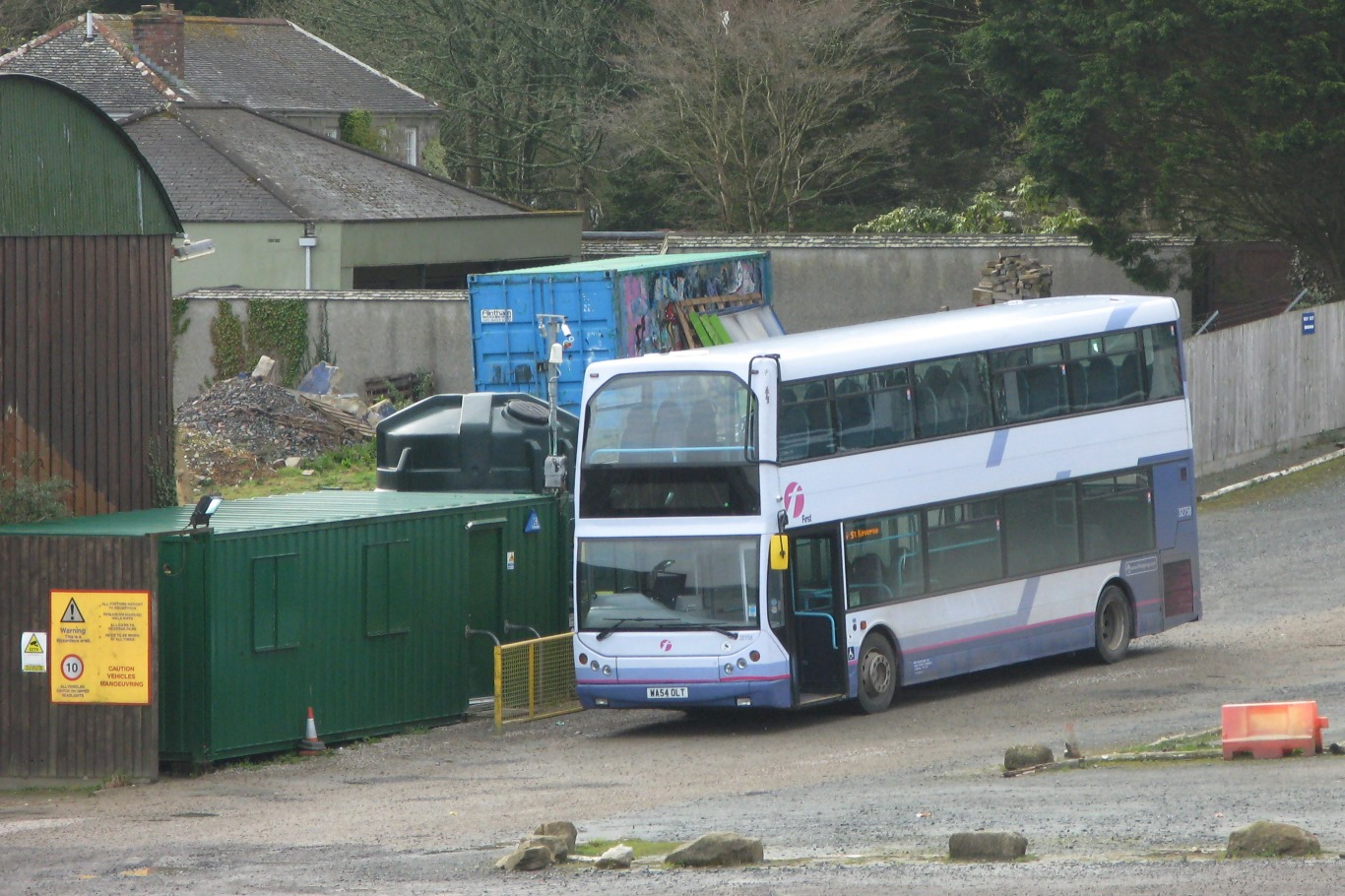
Helston out station

- Bodmin
- Bude
- Eden Project
- Falmouth
- Helston
- Padstow
- Plymouth
- Exeter
- Winkleigh

== Fleet ==
Kernow initially had an older fleet of buses, most of which had been cascaded from other FirstGroup fleets. They included Plaxton Presidents on Volvo B7TL and Dennis Trident 2 chassis, Plaxton Pointer on Dennis Dart chassis, Optare Solos and Mercedes-Benz Citaros from Western Greyhound.

First Kernow received 30 new Alexander Dennis Enviro400 MMCs in late 2016/early 2017 for use on its U1/U2 (blue livery) routes and the Tinner T1/T2 routes (red livery). A further 21 Enviro400 MMCs and 20 Alexander Dennis Enviro200 MMCs were purchased in 2018.

== Livery ==
Some buses allocated to Cornwall carried FirstGroup corporate liveries, although the local brand identities were carried by many of the buses when Kernow ceased operations. The standard Kernow livery used two-tone shades of green, although some routes had their own special liveries:

Colour	Route prefix	Routes	Image
Green	n/a	Unbranded routes	
Teal	n/a	'Atlantic Coaster' serving Newquay and Padstow, 'Lands End Coaster' serving Lands End, Penzance and St Ives, 'Falmouth Coaster' serving Pendennis Castle and Swanpool and 'Tin Coaster' serving Penzance, St Just and Pendeen	
Red	T	'Tinner' between Truro, Camborne and Penzance or St Ives	
Red	U	'Copper' between Redruth and Falmouth	
Blue	U	University services serving the Penryn and Falmouth campuses	
Blue	PR	Truro park and ride	
Cream and blue, green, purple or orange	M	The Mousehole between Penzance and Mousehole	Penzance Bus Station - First 54112 (WA23FXG)
Green	L	The Lizard livery serves the Lizard area, covering Helston, Mullion, Kuggar, Gunwalloe, Hayle, St Ives and Redruth.	
Yellow and purple	D	Daytripper	
Green and white	n/a	The Cornwall College Group livery, Branding changes depending on the college. (Duchy College, Falmouth Marine School, Bicton College and Cornwall College variants)	
