= First South Western =

First South Western may refer to:

- First South West - bus operator in England
- South Western Railway - train operator in England
