= Transport for Cornwall =

Public transport organisation in Cornwall, England

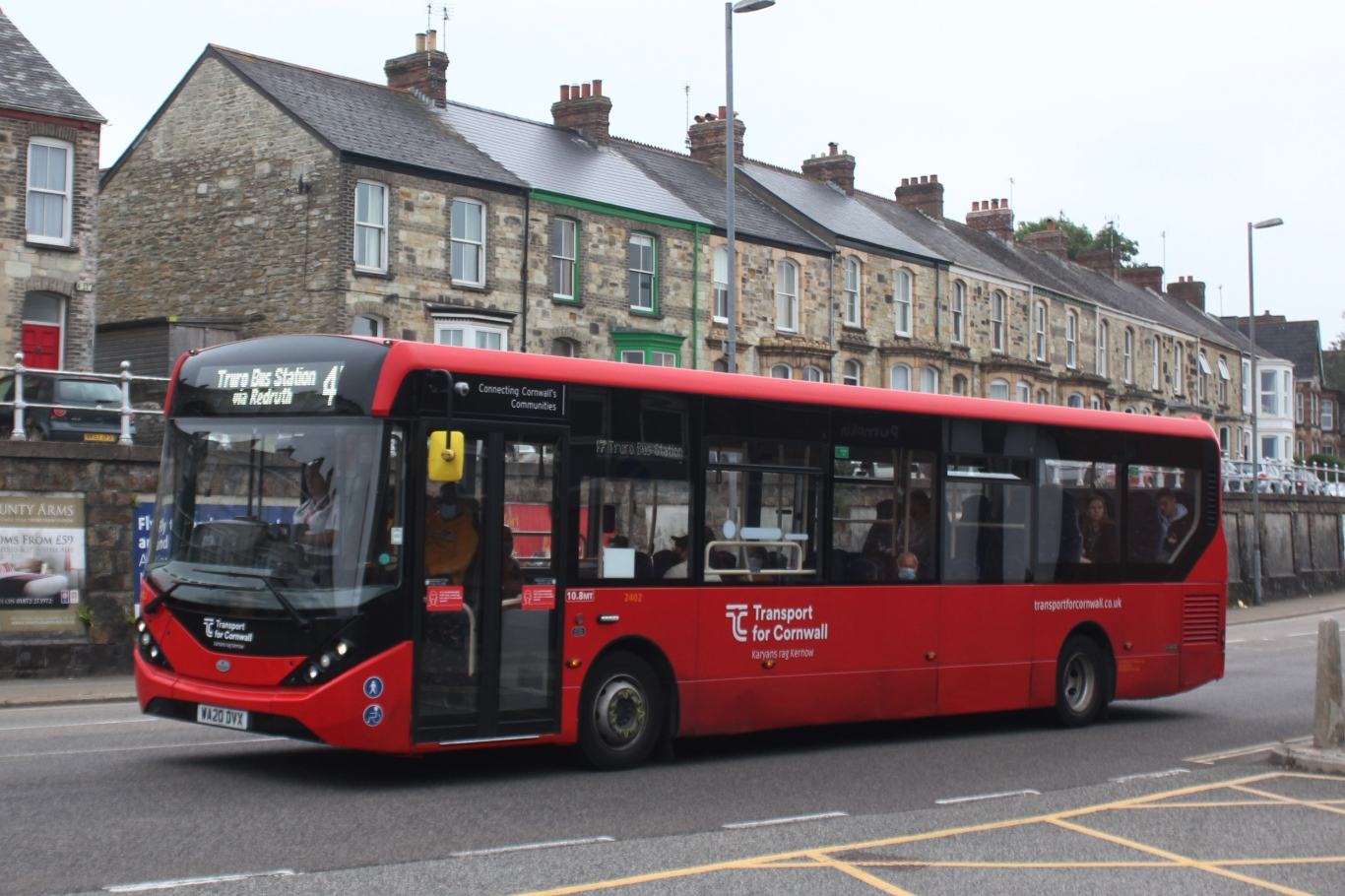
- Transport for Cornwall bus operated by Go Cornwall Bus in Truro
- Parent: Cornwall Council
- Founded: 2015
- Headquarters: Suites 1-2, The Palace Building, Quay Street, Truro, Cornwall, TR1 2HE
- Service area: Cornwall, England, United Kingdom
- Service type: Enhanced Partnership (Bus Services Act 2017)
- Operator: Go Cornwall Bus (Go-Ahead Group), Cornwall by Kernow (FirstGroup), other local bus operators
- Website: transportforcornwall.co.uk

An older variation of the logo

Transport for Cornwall (Cornish: Karyans rag Kernow) is a partnership between local government and transport operators responsible for the development and integration of the transport network in Cornwall.

Transport for Cornwall is responsible for council-funded buses in Cornwall, with various national and local bus companies running the services via franchise. It does not oversee any other forms of public transport in the county, which are limited to passenger rail, air, and ferry services.

== History ==
=== Before the partnership ===
Transport for Cornwall branding arose from the One Public Transport System for Cornwall plan, created by Cornwall Council in 2015, when limited devolution powers were given to Cornwall which included public transport governance. Prior to this, the bus network in Cornwall was run by multiple private operators, with no integrated timetabling nor ticketing, with some tendered services being funded by the council to improve rural access. Traveline provided some combined journey planning.

=== One Public Transport System for Cornwall: Initial partnership ===
Under Cornwall's first devolution deal in 2015, the county was given the power to develop and franchise bus transport. Cornwall Council initially invested in new facilities such as waiting areas, vehicles and real-time arrival displays at bus stops. This was done with extra funding from the Cornwall and Isles of Scilly Local Enterprise Partnership, GWR and Plymouth's Transforming Cities Fund. This was done in cooperation with various local bus operators under the title 'One Public Transport System for Cornwall'.

In January 2020, Cornwall Council awarded Go Cornwall Bus an 8-year contract (totalling £192 million) to provide bus services under the scheme.

=== Launch of Transport for Cornwall brand ===
In March 2020, Go Cornwall Bus partnered with Cornwall Council and local operators to form the new Transport for Cornwall brand, with plans calling for an additional 130 vehicles. The Transport for Cornwall website went live on 14 March 2020.

=== Developments since 2020 ===
The bus single fare cap was increased on 1 January 2025 from £2 to £3 in line with the national policy announced in the October 2024 United Kingdom budget.

The Go Cornwall bus app was merged early in 2025 with the remaining services not on the earlier 'Passenger'-derived programme (mainly First Kernow operations).

With the Bus Services Act 2025, Cornwall is to be part of a pilot scheme regarding bus franchising.

== Organisation and role ==
Transport for Cornwall is not an organisation, but a partnership of organisations. However, it does have staff, both direct and seconded from participating companies and Cornwall Council.

The partnership is responsible for training drivers and plans routes. It directly runs most of Go Cornwall Bus services and subsidises others.

Transport for Cornwall's funding comes from a mixture of sources including direct central government funding, direct community development funding, indirect funding such as fare schemes, and private investment in vehicles from member companies.

== Fares ==
=== Any Ticket, Any Bus: Shared ticketing ===
Under Transport for Cornwall's 'Any Ticket, Any Bus' ticketing system, all participating companies now use one ticket system for journeys inside Cornwall. Despite not being part of the scheme, Stagecoach buses on routes inside Cornwall also accept tickets from other operators, as long as the journey on the original ticket is completely within Cornwall.

Exceptions to the Any Bus, Any Ticket scheme are college and university passes, Park & Ride, and contract buses.

=== Schemes for reducing fare costs ===
Transport for Cornwall received £23.5 million in 2022 from the UK Government as a pilot scheme to increase ridership by reducing bus fares. Fares were therefore further simplified and reduced in April 2022.

=== Tap & Cap ===
Transport for Cornwall's multi-operator capped contactless ticket system, Tap & Cap, caps travel charges at a maximum of £5 a day or £20 a week (as of January 2023), regardless of the number of trips. Passengers pay onboard by tapping their contactless payment method when entering and leaving the bus. Tap & Cap supports Visa, Mastercard, Apple Pay and Android Pay. However, not all companies in the network offer contactless payment, and other fares (including child fares, town zone fares, singles and returns) cannot be bought via Tap & Cap. These can still be bought using cash or contactless methods from the driver in contactless-equipped vehicles. In the future it is planned for bus/rail integrated ticketing as both systems now have Smartcard/Contactless readers.

=== Town zones ===
Cheaper fares are available for travel only within 14 defined "town zones": Penzance, Hayle, St Ives, Camborne, Redruth, Helston, Falmouth-Penryn, Newquay, St Austell, Bodmin, Truro, Bude, Launceston, and Liskeard.

== Identity and marketing ==
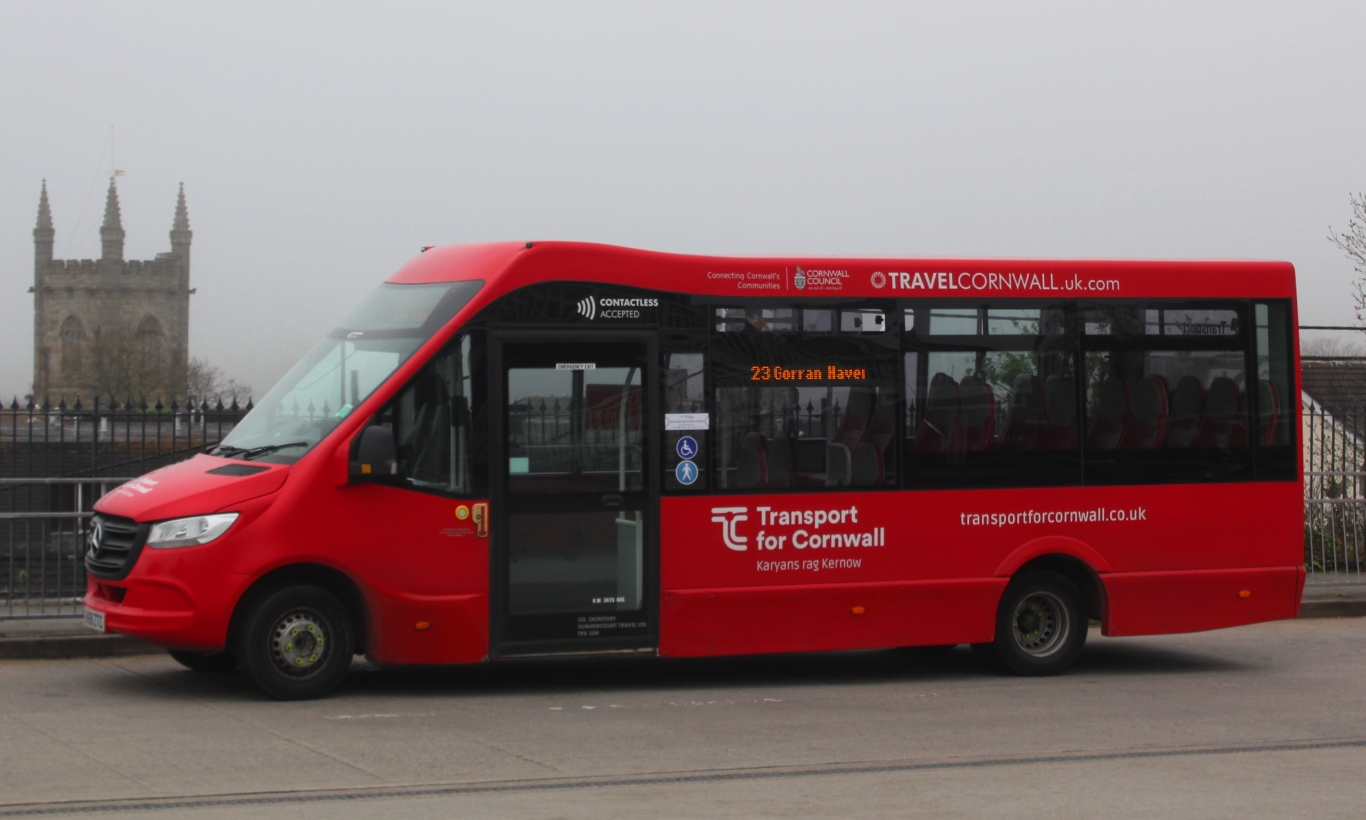
A Mellor Strata operated by Summercourt Travel in Transport for Cornwall livery (St Austell, 2022)

Inspired by Transport for London's roundel, Transport for Cornwall's logo was designed to give an identity to the network as a whole.

New buses in the network have red Transport for Cornwall livery, and old buses from the various operators are being rebranded. Bus stop signs have been updated with the new branding and Transport for Cornwall has also produced branded integrated bus network maps.

In February 2023 Transport for Cornwall launched the Love The Bus campaign, aimed at youth.

== See also ==
- Passenger transport executive
- Media related to Transport for Cornwall at Wikimedia Commons
