= Truronian =

British bus operating company

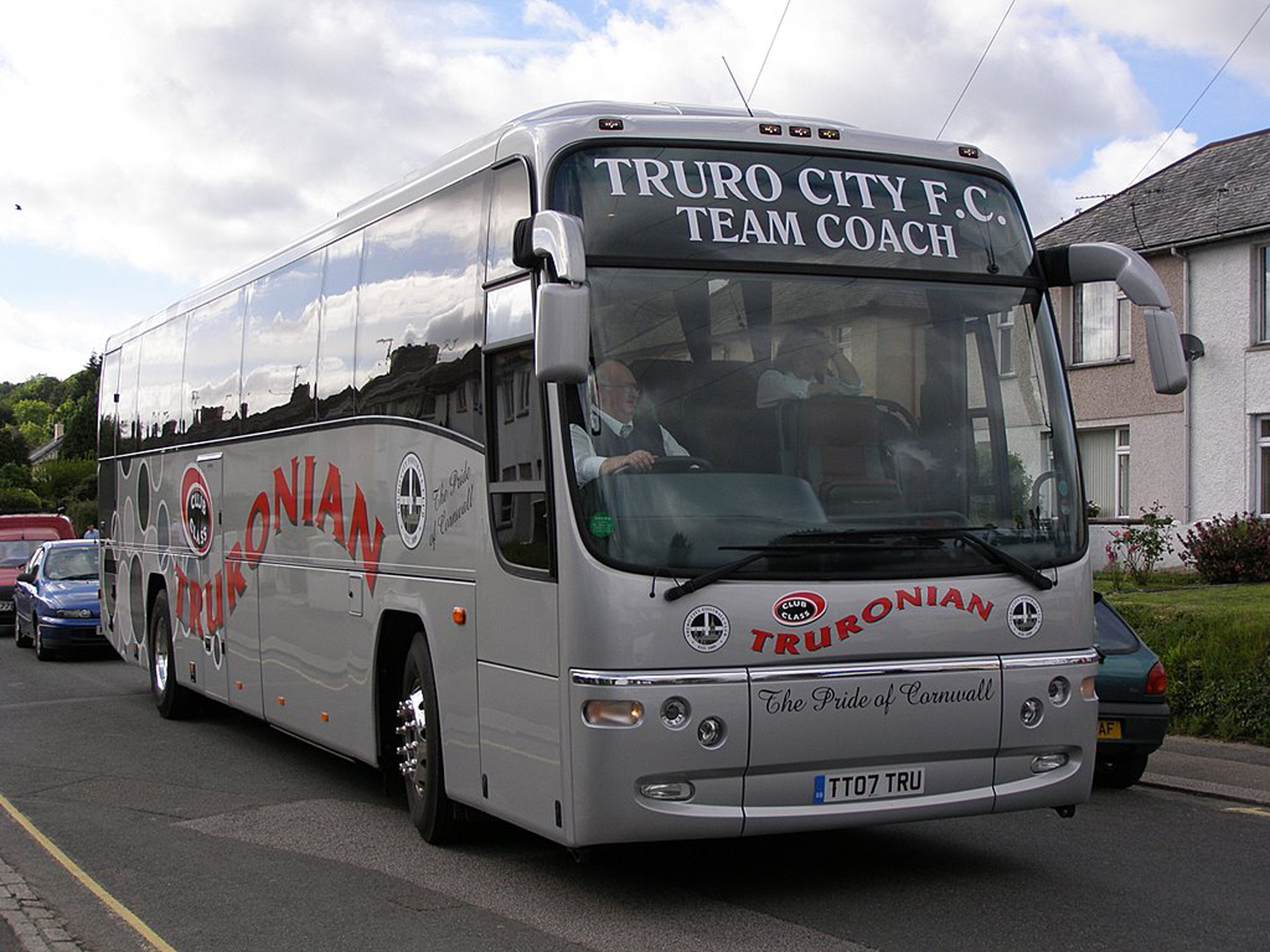
- Plaxton Panther bodied Volvo B12B in May 2007
- Parent: Go-Ahead Group
- Founded: September 1987; 38 years ago
- Headquarters: Truro
- Locale: South West England
- Service area: Cornwall
- Hubs: Truro bus station
- Depots: 2
- Fleet: 70 (February 2008)
- Website: https://www.dartline.co.uk/

Truronian is a coach operator based in Cornwall. Since February 2026 it has been owned and operated by Go South West, a subsidiary of the Go-Ahead Group. Previously, it also had a bus operation and a holiday business.

== History ==
Truronian was formed in September 1987 by former Western National managers Ken Branchett, David Rabey, and Geoff Rumbles. In 1988, the business of Flora Motors, Helston, was purchased, followed in 1993 by CR Williams Coaches, St Agnes.

Services operated included park and ride services for the Eden Project and express services for National Express.

In April 2008, Truroninan was purchased by FirstGroup with 50 buses and 20 coaches and integrated into its First Devon & Cornwall operation.

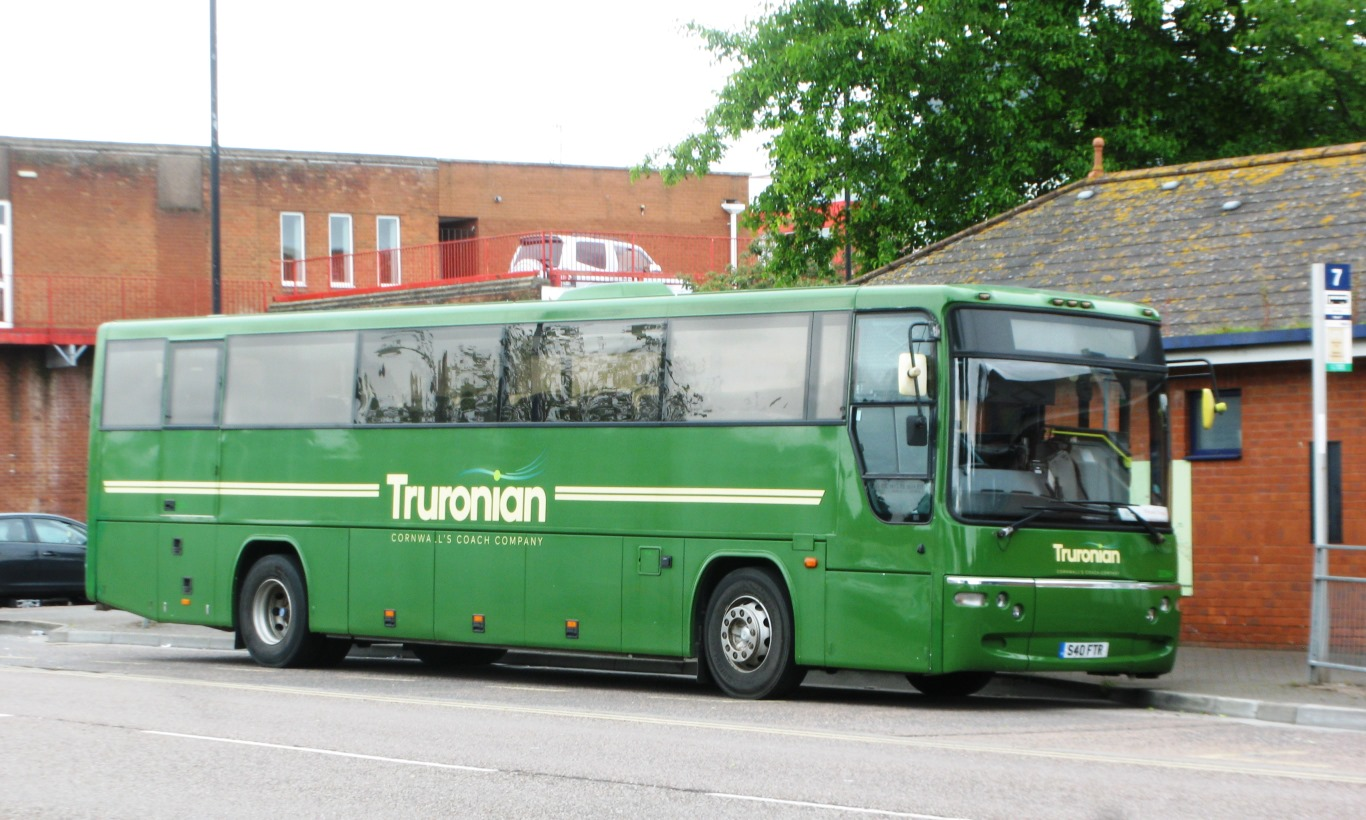
A Plaxton Profile in the green livery used by FirstGroup for Truronian coaches

The holiday business ceased in November 2011. In March 2012, Newell's Travel, a travel agent within Cornwall, began using the Truronian Holidays name for British, Irish and Continental Holidays programme.

In November 2025, as a result of ongoing financial challenges, competition from other operators and significant falls in passenger numbers, First Bus announced that it was to withdraw from Cornwall entirely on 14 February 2026. While not part of the original proposal for exiting the Cornwall market, First Bus sold Truronian Coaches to the Go South West, under their Plymouth Citybus operating license.

As of February 2026, the Go-Ahead Group has started the process of bringing in new vehicles to Truronian, as no vehicles were included in the sale. The new vehicles share the red and white livery style of Dartline coaches, which was previously acquired in 2022 .
