= Plaxton Leopard =

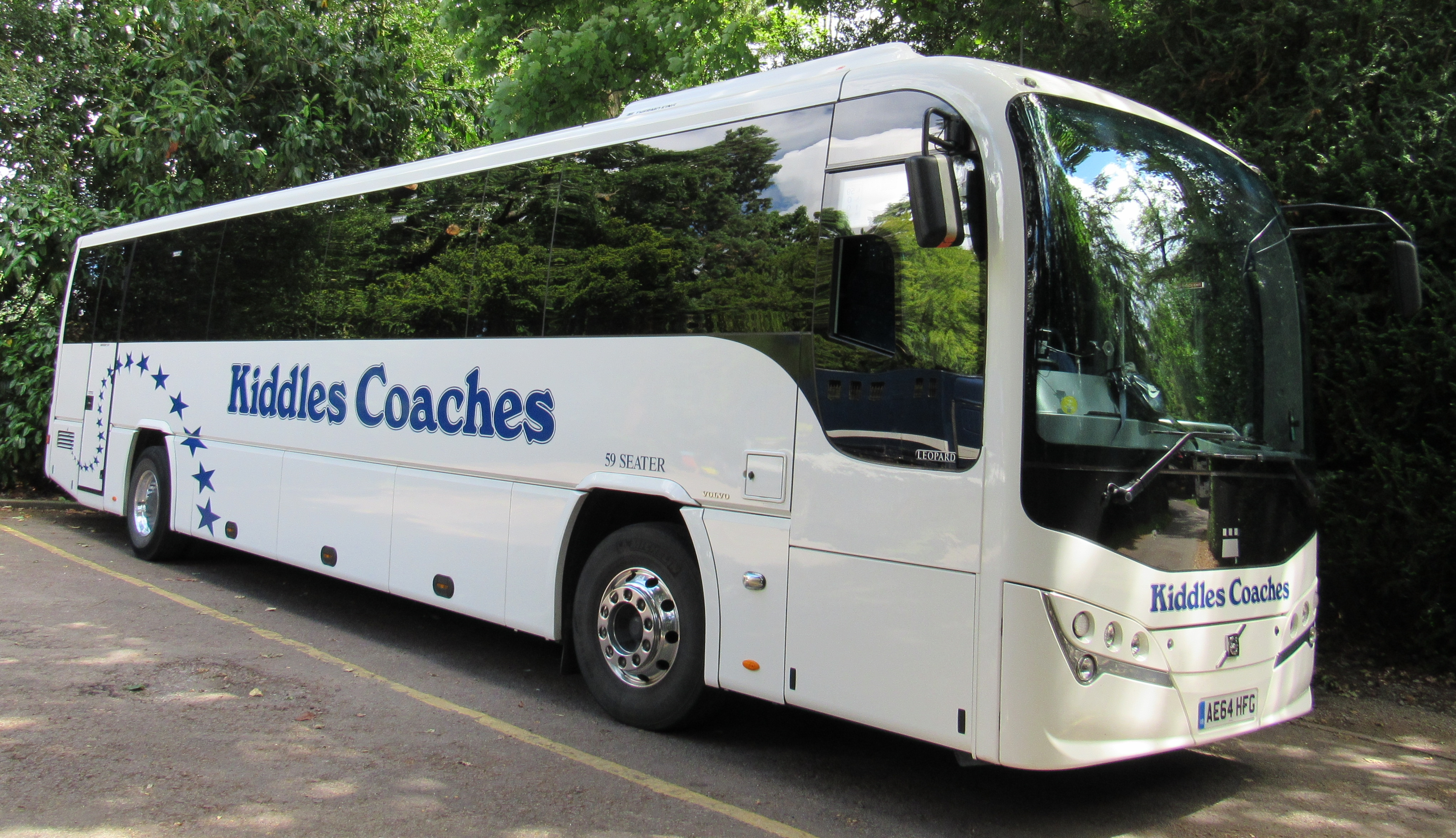
- Plaxton Leopard bodied Volvo B8R

Overview
- Manufacturer: Plaxton
- Production: 2013–present

Body and chassis
- Class: Bus bodywork
- Doors: 1
- Chassis: Volvo B9R; Volvo B8R

Powertrain
- Capacity: 50-72 seated

Dimensions
- Length: 12.8 metres
- Width: 2.50 metres
- Height: 3.45 metres

Chronology
- Predecessor: Plaxton Profile

The Plaxton Leopard is a coach body manufactured by Plaxton. It was introduced in October 2013 as a replacement for the Plaxton Profile.

With a width of 2.50 metres, it is five centimetres narrower than the United Kingdom standard. When designed, it was envisaged that it would also be manufactured by Australian bodybuilder Custom Coaches, at the time a subsidiary of Plaxton's parent Alexander Dennis, where there is a narrower width limit. Even though it never ended up being produced in Australia, the narrower width remained.

Initially fitted to Volvo B9R chassis, it has since been adapted for the replacement Volvo B8R.

== Suspension of production ==
In March 2024, Alexander Dennis announced that production of all Plaxton coaches would be suspended for at least two years, owing to factory capacity being required for the Enviro EV range of buses. In speculating whether production of any existing models might resume, Mark Williams, writing in Bus & Coach Buyer, noted that the MCV EvoTor on Volvo B8R chassis "could be viewed [...] as almost a straight swap for Leopard".
