= The Buses of Somerset =

Bus operator in Taunton and Bridgwater

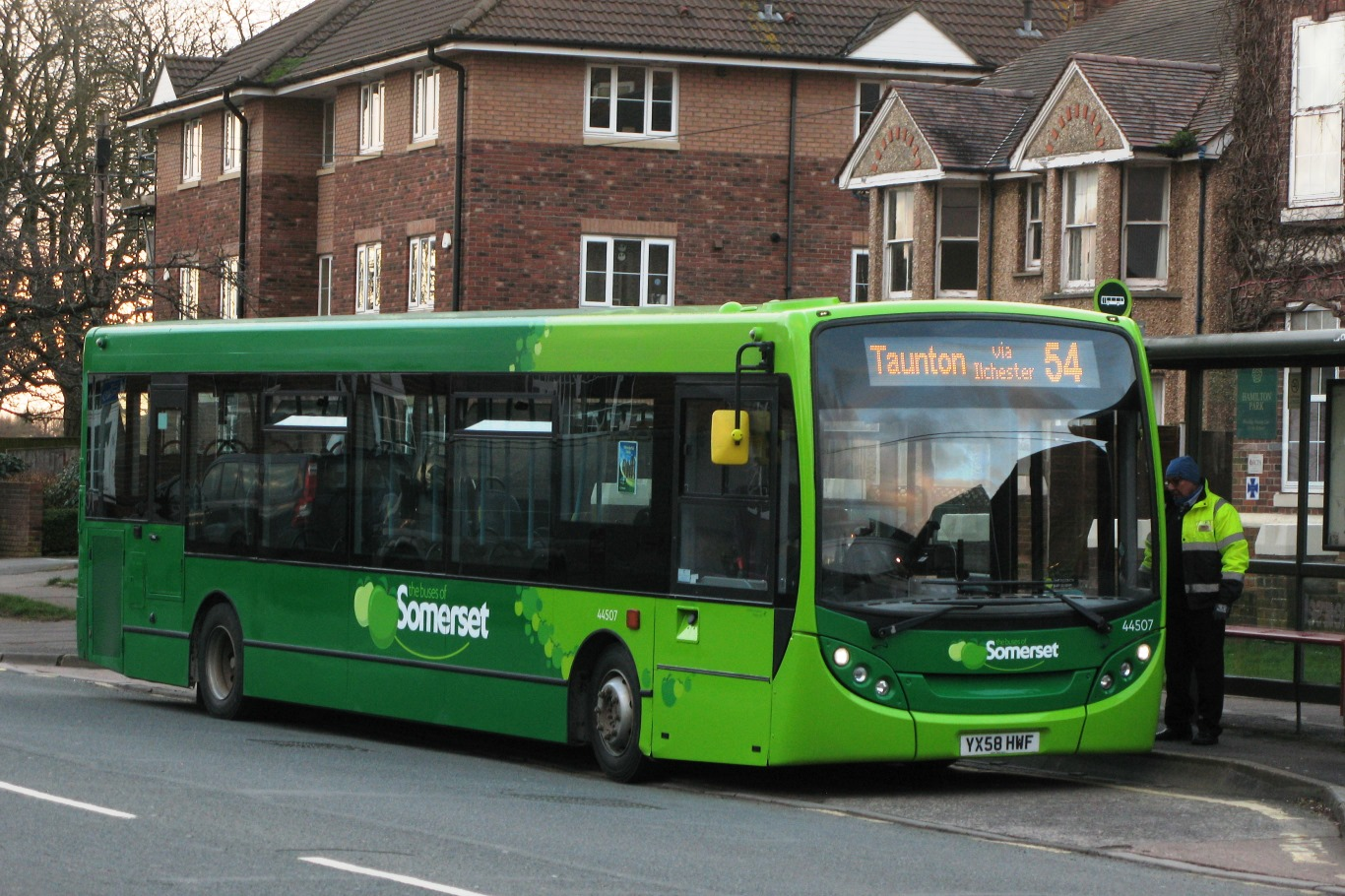
- Alexander Dennis Enviro200 in Taunton in February 2021
- Parent: First South West
- Founded: 2014
- Headquarters: Taunton
- Service area: Somerset; Devon; Dorset
- Service type: Bus services
- Depots: 2
- Chief executive: Alex Carter
- Website: busesofsomerset.co.uk

The Buses of Somerset was a brand used by FirstGroup for its buses in Somerset from its depots in Taunton and other towns from 2014 until 2024. The services were initially operated by its First Somerset & Avon subsidiary but were soon transferred to a new First South West company. Although the brand name is being phased out, it can still be seen on buses and signs.

== History ==
Southern National was formed in 1983 as the Somerset and Dorset operations of Western National (then part of the National Bus Company). It was privatised in 1988, acquired by FirstGroup in 1999 and rebranded as First Southern National. In 2003 the Somerset operations of First Southern National were merged into First Somerset & Avon. In 2014 the services were relaunched as 'The Buses of Somerset'.

FirstGroup announced in December 2024 that it was ending the use of local brands such as The Buses of Somerset. It will be phased out as buses and signs are replaced or repainted.

== Livery ==
Some buses allocated to The Buses of Somerset carry FirstGroup corporate liveries but a local brand identity and livery is carried by most of the fleet. When this appeared it was the first major departure from the FirstGroup corporate identity and livery which was previously applied almost universally across the group's bus operations. The business instead now uses a two tone green and cream livery with bespoke branding, website and social media profiles. Buses allocated to Taunton town services were branded 'The Buses of Taunton' but using the same livery as other buses in the fleet.

The livery was revised from 2020 with different shade of green and new logos. Taunton town services now have a different arrangement of the two green colours and are branded 'Taunton's town buses'. Certain routes have specially branded buses including the former Taunton Park and Ride (orange and purple), Quantock Line (route 28; brown and cream), Burnham-on-Sea to Taunton (route 21; blue) and Exmoor Coaster (blue).

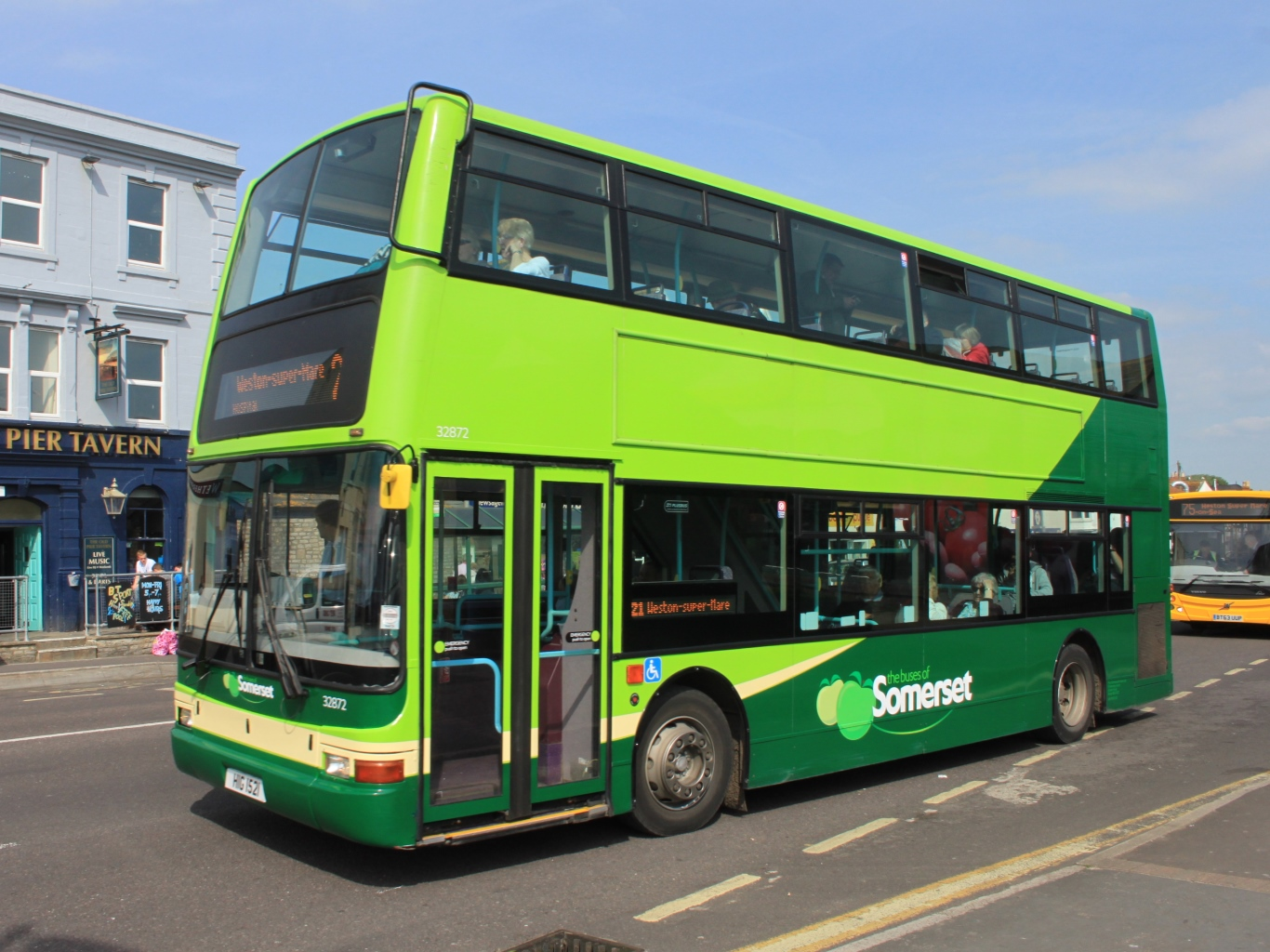
Original fleet livery

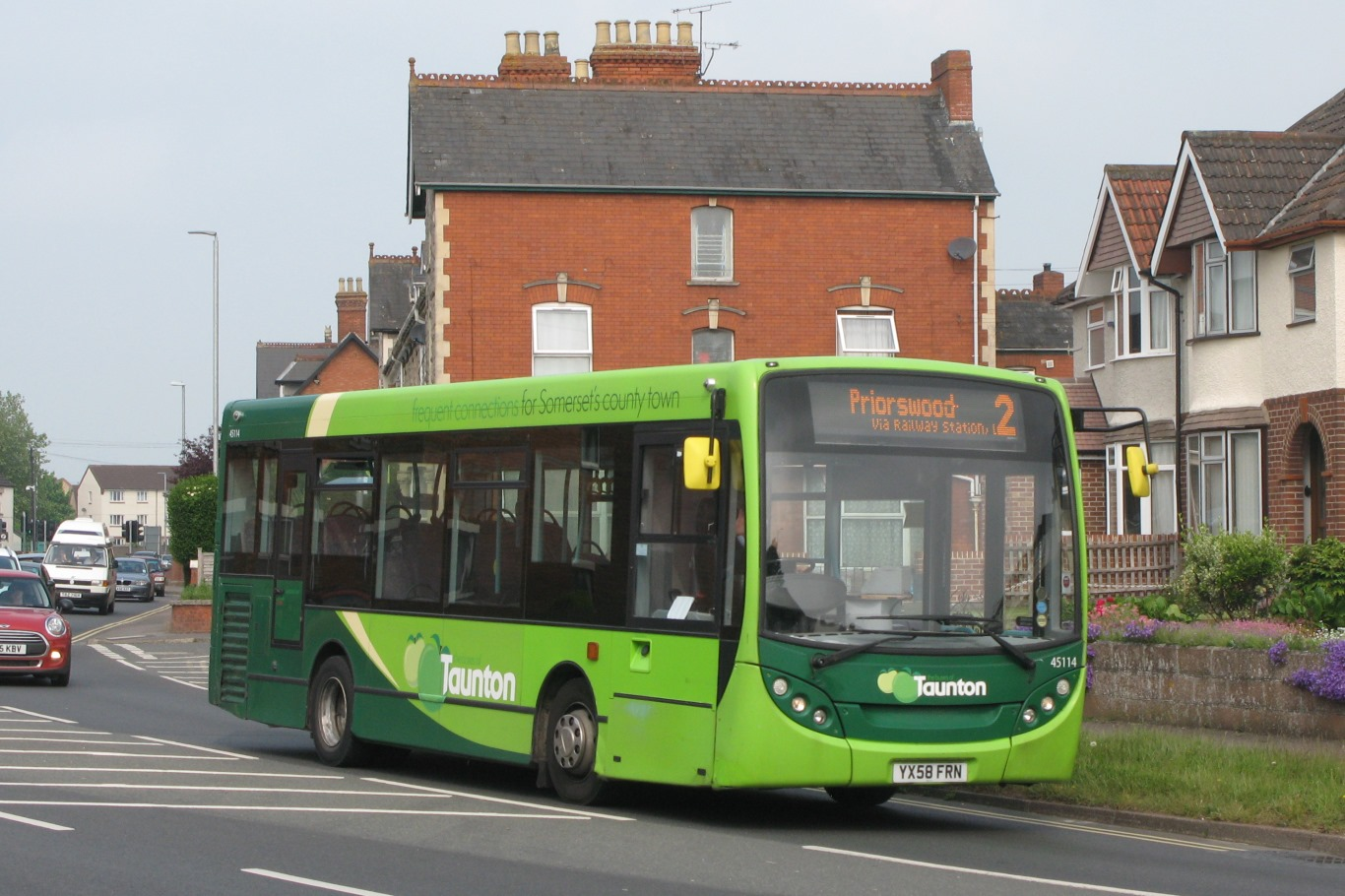
Original Taunton livery

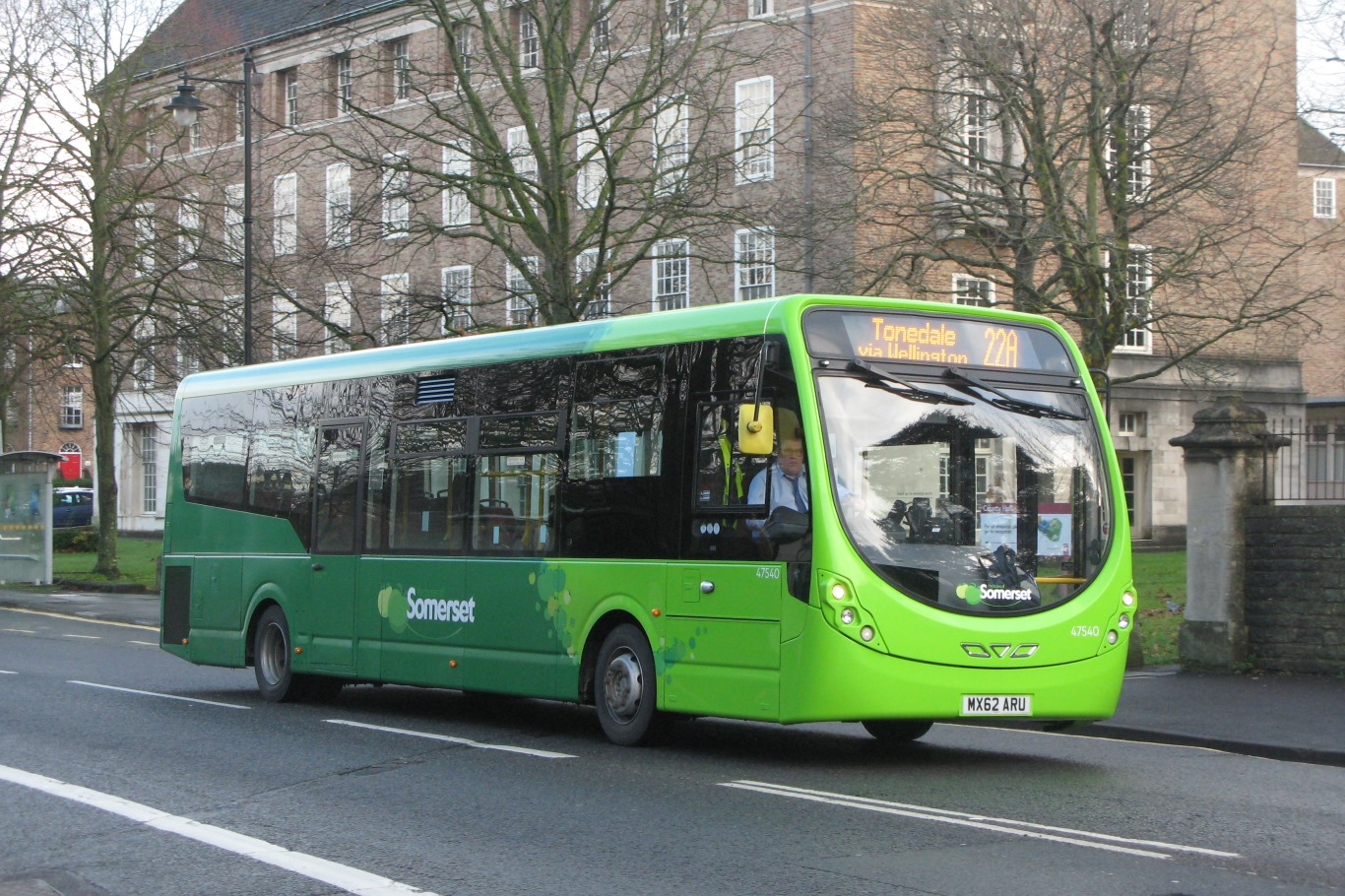
Revised single deck livery

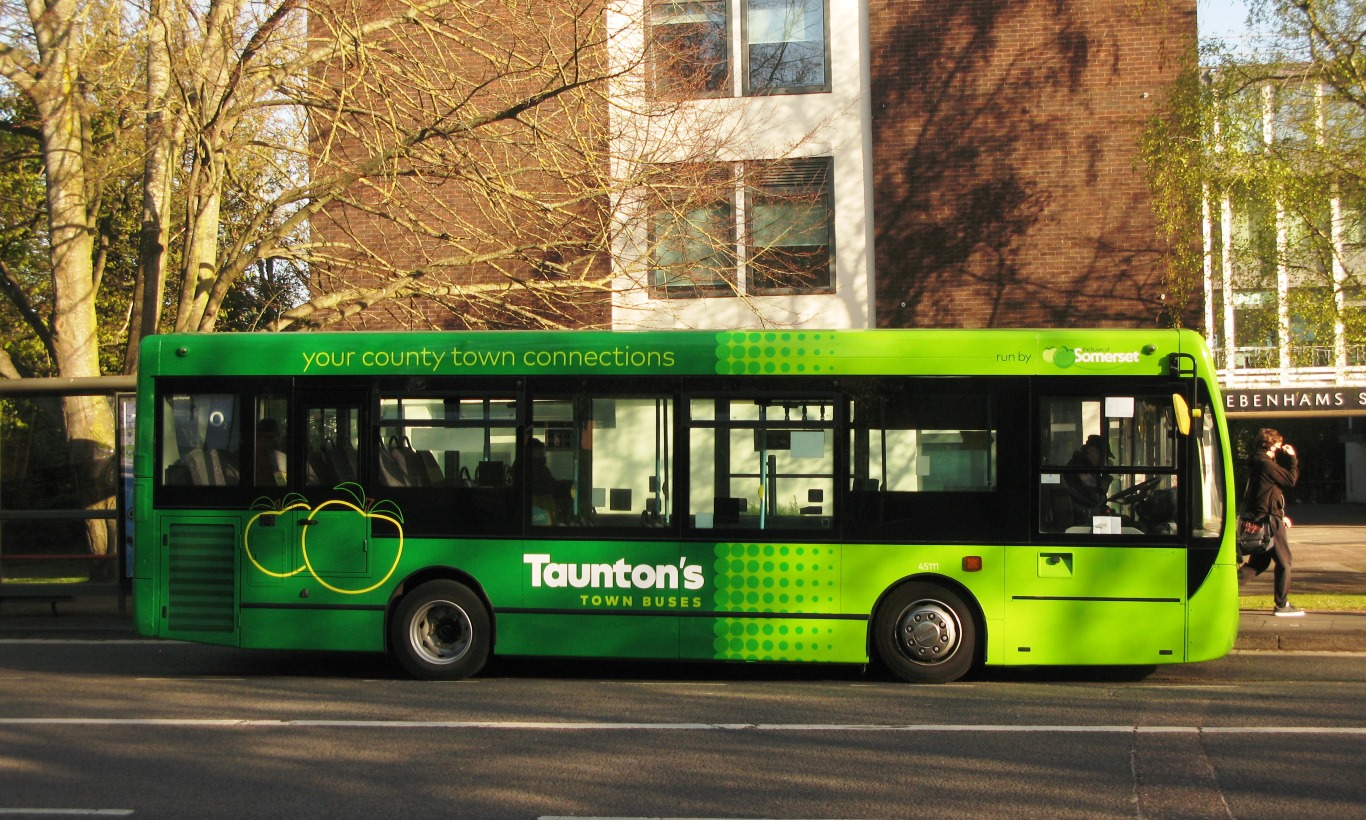
Revised Taunton livery

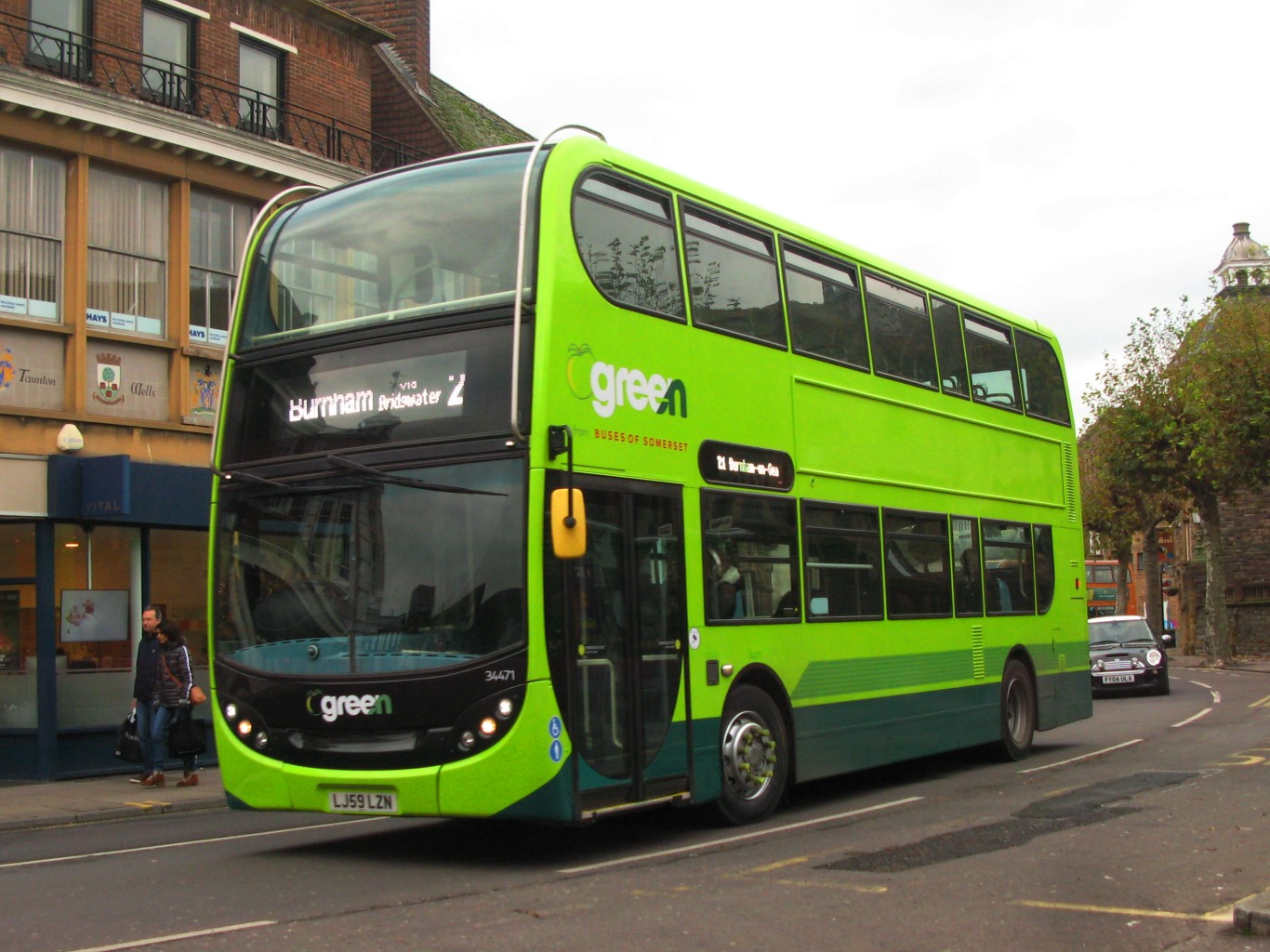
Revised double decker livery
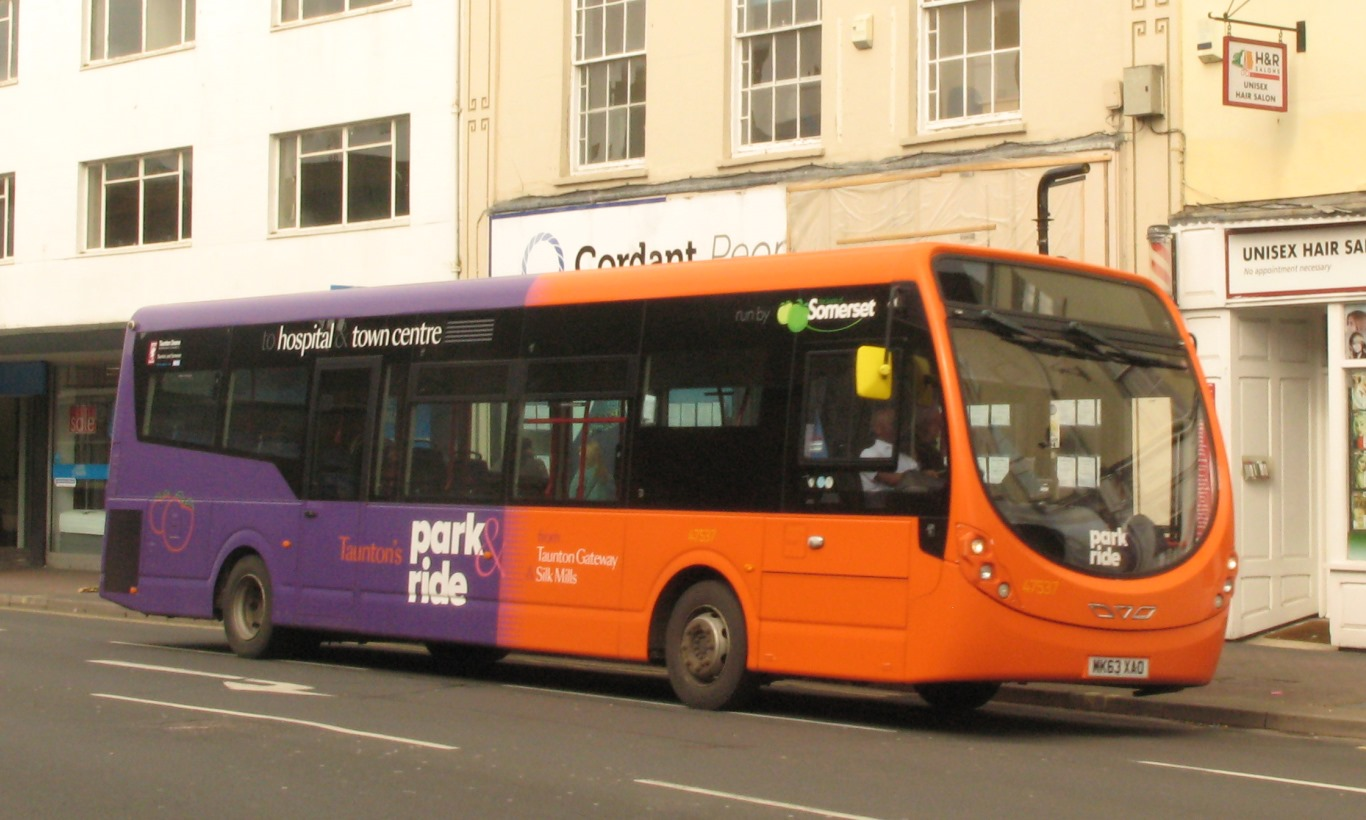
Taunton park and ride

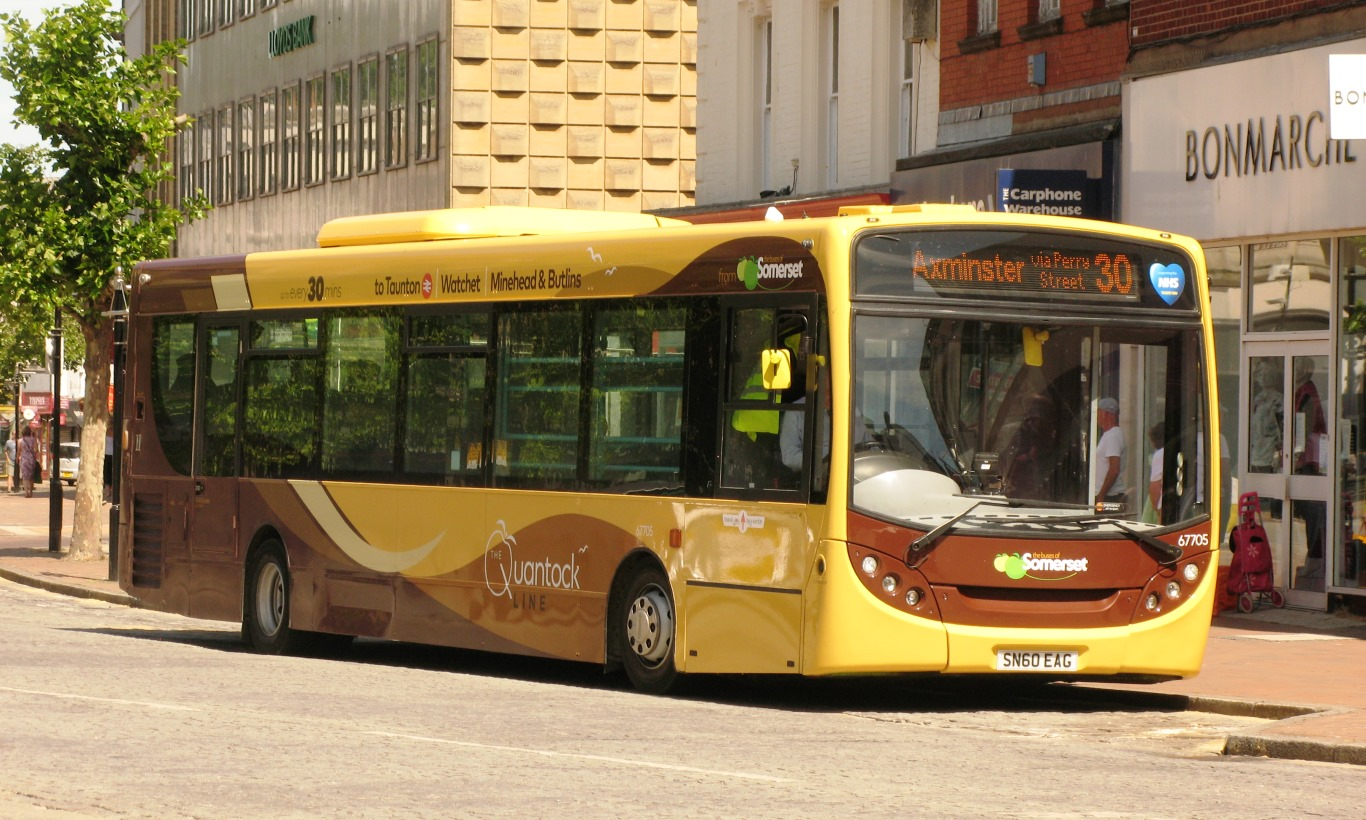
Quantock Line

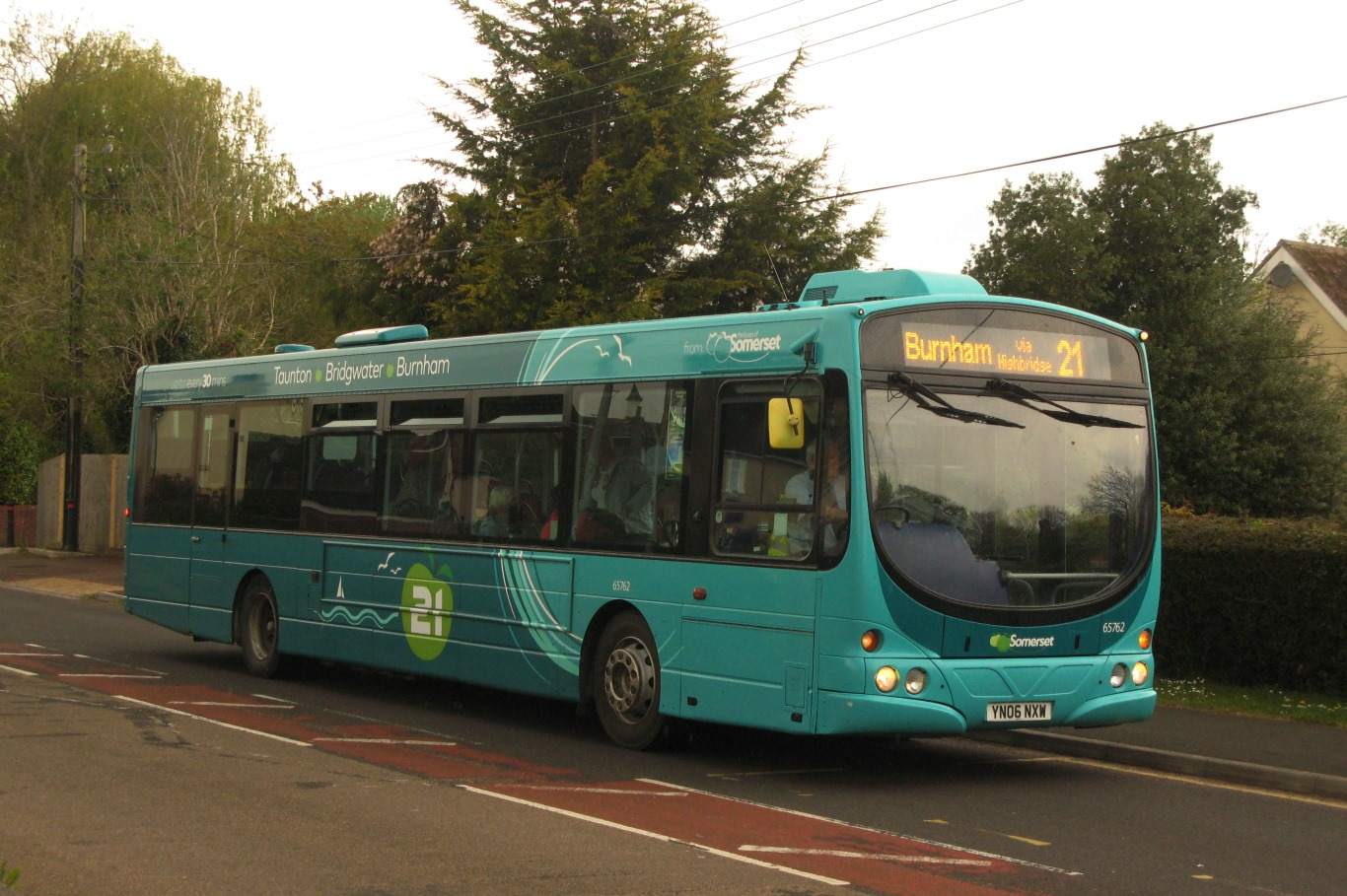
Route 21

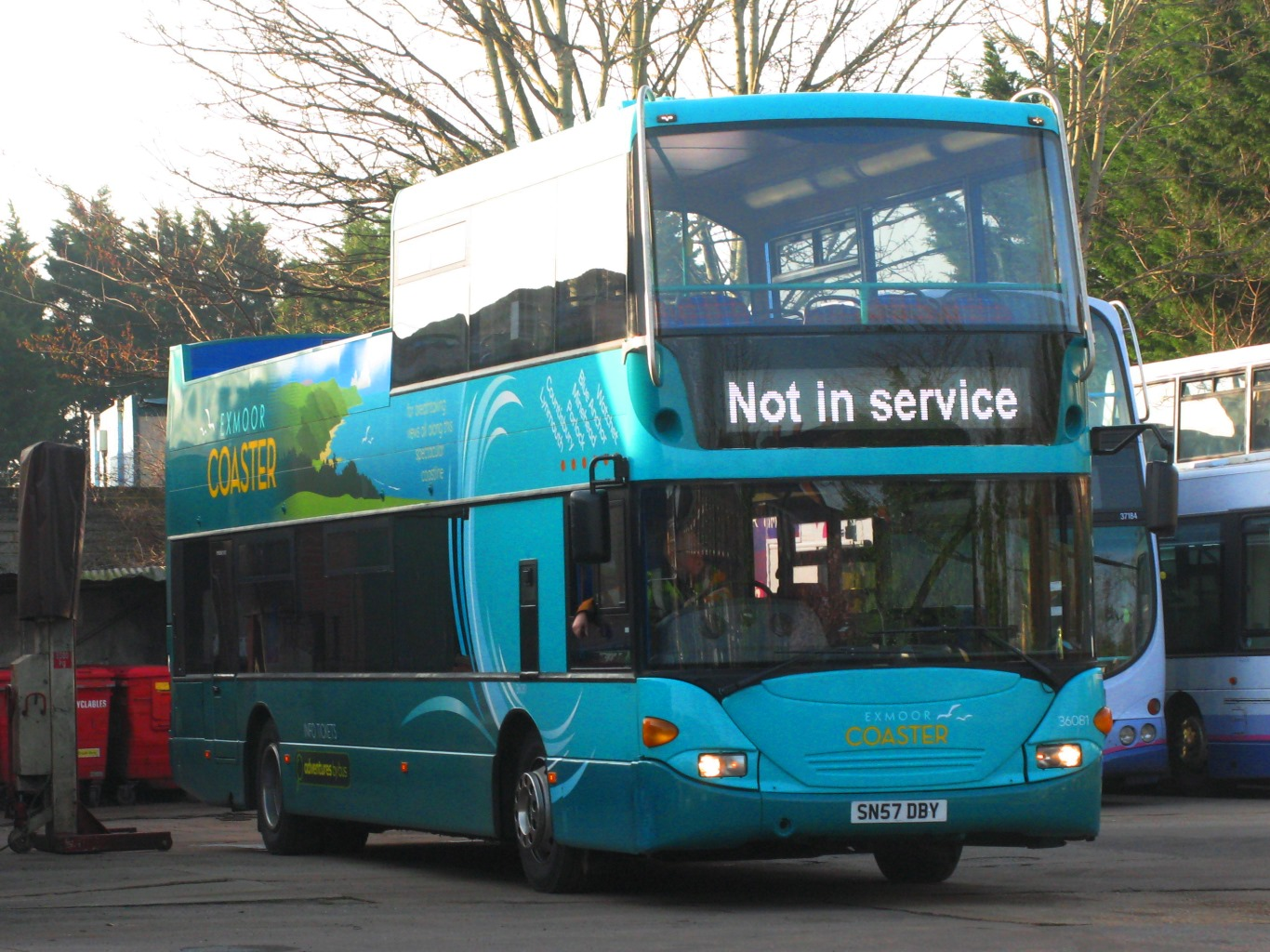
Exmoor Coaster

== Depots ==
The Buses of Somerset initially operated from two depots in Taunton and Bridgwater along with an outstation in Minehead. Yeovil was added in 2016, having previously been part of First Hampshire & Dorset.

In September 2022, the Exeter outstation transferred from Turonian to Buses of Somerset.

The Bridgwater depot closed at the end of 2 September 2023 when crews and vehicles were transferred to the other depots.

After attempts to sell the Yeovil site failed, FirstBus suggested in 2023 that it would demolish it instead. The number of buses operating from Yeovil had reduced from 43 to 9 because some routes had been transferred to First West of England depots.

== Routes ==
The Buses of Somerset routes link Taunton, Bridgwater, Yeovil and other major towns:

- 14 Bridgwater to Cannington (1 journey to Nether Stowey)
- 15 Bridgwater to Minehead (College days only)
- 21/21A Taunton to Burnham-on-Sea
- 22/22A Taunton to Rockwell Green/Tonedale
  - X22 Taunton to Tiverton
  - 22C Taunton to Cullompton (College days only)
- 25/25A Taunton to Cotford St Luke and Wiveliscombe
- 28 'Quantock Line' Taunton to Minehead
  - 28A Taunton to Minehead
- 30 Taunton to Axminster
- 51 Abbey Manor Park to Yeovil Town Centre
- 54 Taunton to Yeovil
- 58 Yeovil to Wincanton
- 61 Cavalier Way to Yeovil Town Centre
- 623/625 Wellington/Taunton to Bridgwater College (college days only)
- EX1 'Exmoor Coaster' Minehead to Ilfracombe (seasonal)
- CR4 Yeovil to Blandford Forum
- Taunton town services
  - 1 Taunton Parade to Wellsprings and Priorswood
  - 1E Silk Mills to Wellsprings via Taunton Parade (evening service)
  - 4 Taunton Parade to Lane Estate
  - 6 Taunton Parade to Holway
  - 7 Taunton Parade to Galmington
- Bridgwater town services
  - B1 Hamp to Bridgwater Community Hospital

== See also ==
- First South West
- First West of England
- Taunton bus station
