= Western Greyhound =

Former bus company in the UK

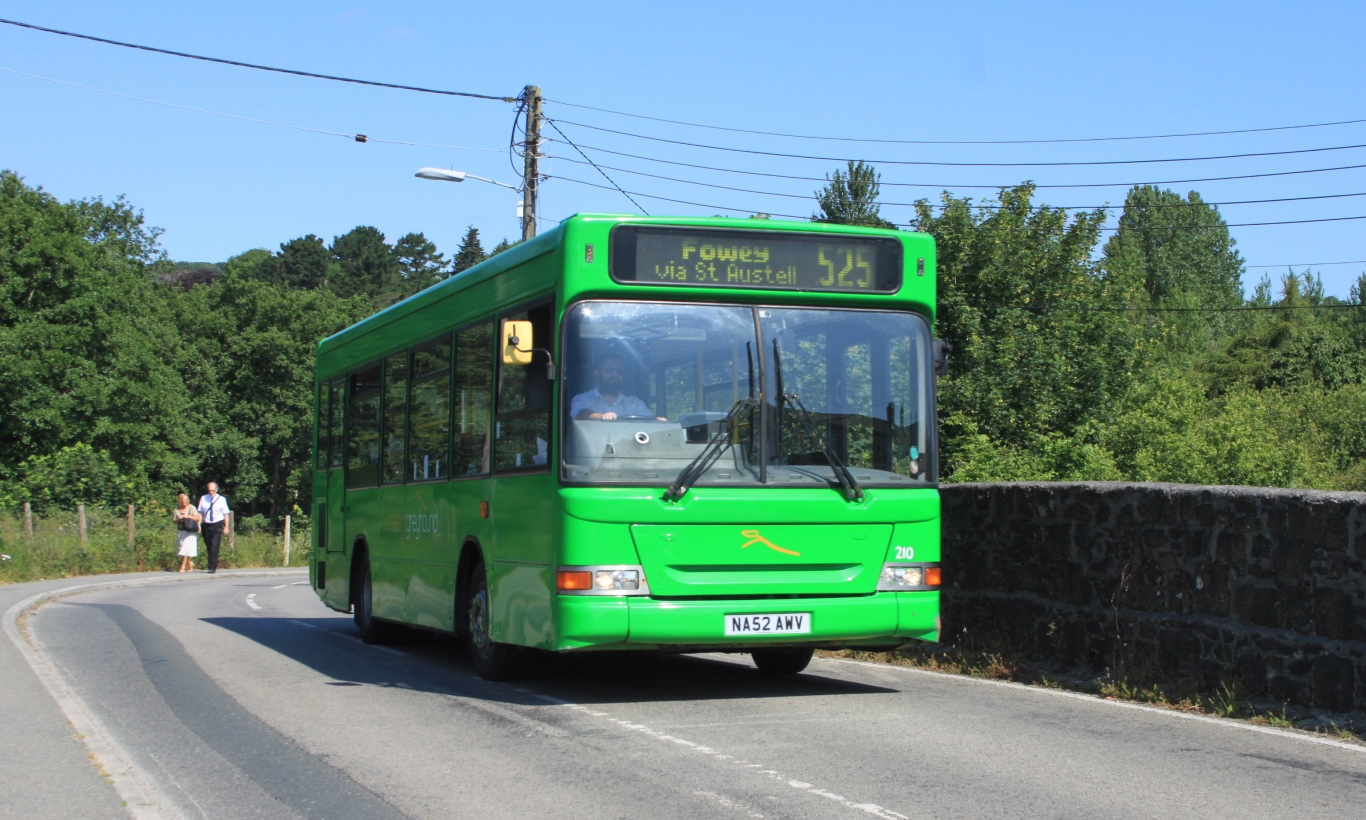
- Plaxton Pointer 2 bodied Dennis Dart SLF in Par in 2014
- Founded: January 1998
- Defunct: 13 March 2015
- Headquarters: Summercourt
- Service area: Cornwall; Devon
- Depots: 2
- Fleet: 65 (December 2014)
- Chief executive: Mark Howarth (1998–2014); Michael Bishop (2014–2015)
- Website: www.westerngreyhound.com

Western Greyhound was a bus operator based in Summercourt, near Newquay, which operated services in Cornwall and Devon from January 1998 until March 2015.

== History ==
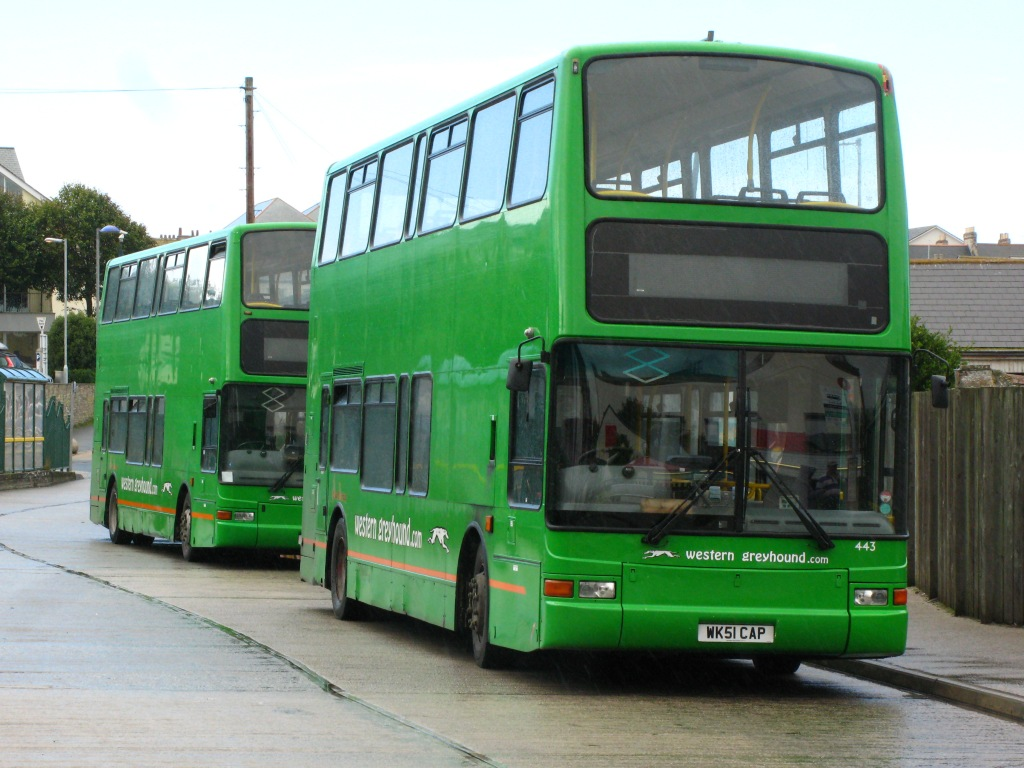
Plaxton President bodied Dennis Trident 2s at Newquay bus station in August 2011

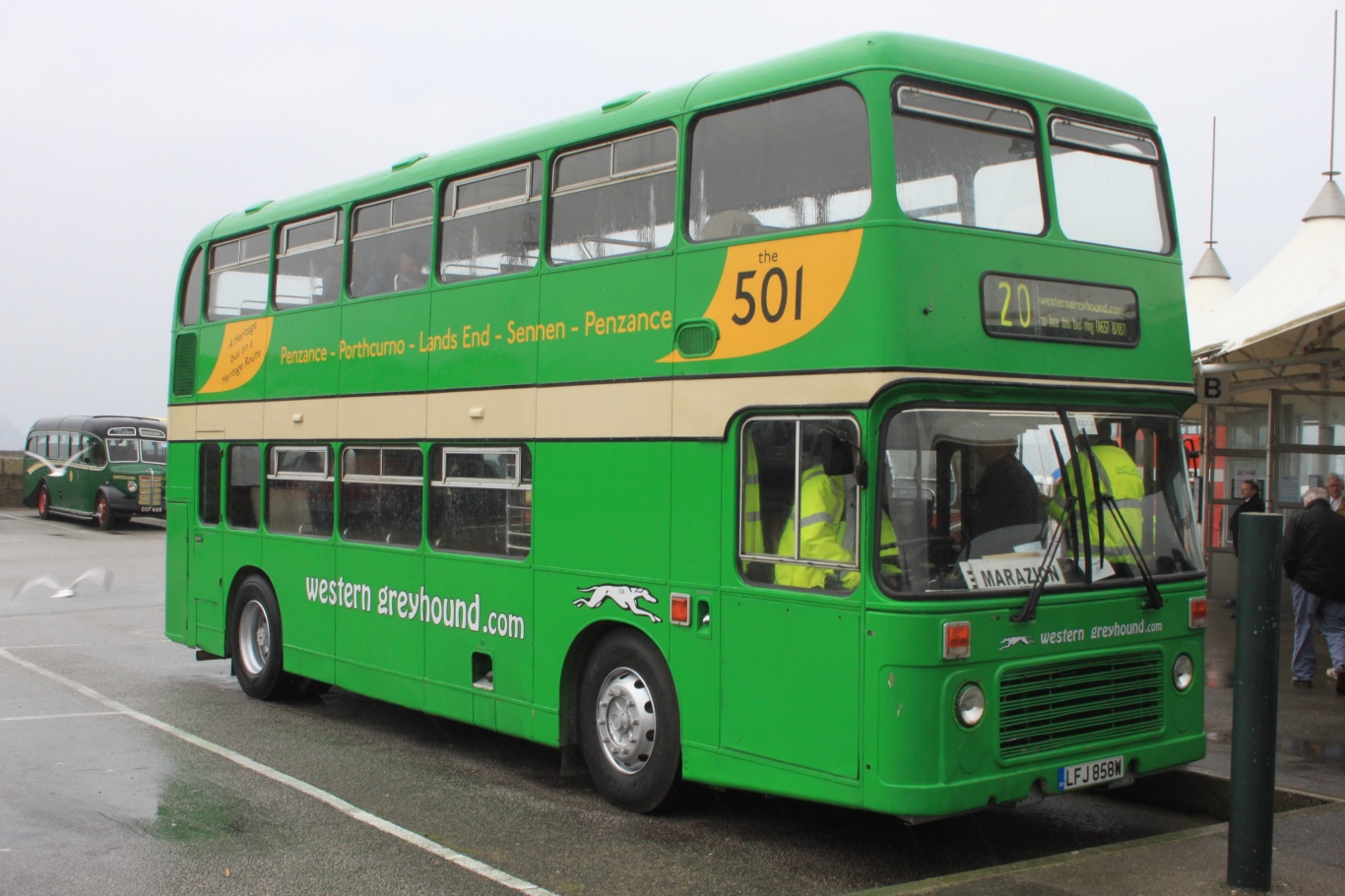
ECW bodied Bristol VRT at Penzance bus station in April 2014

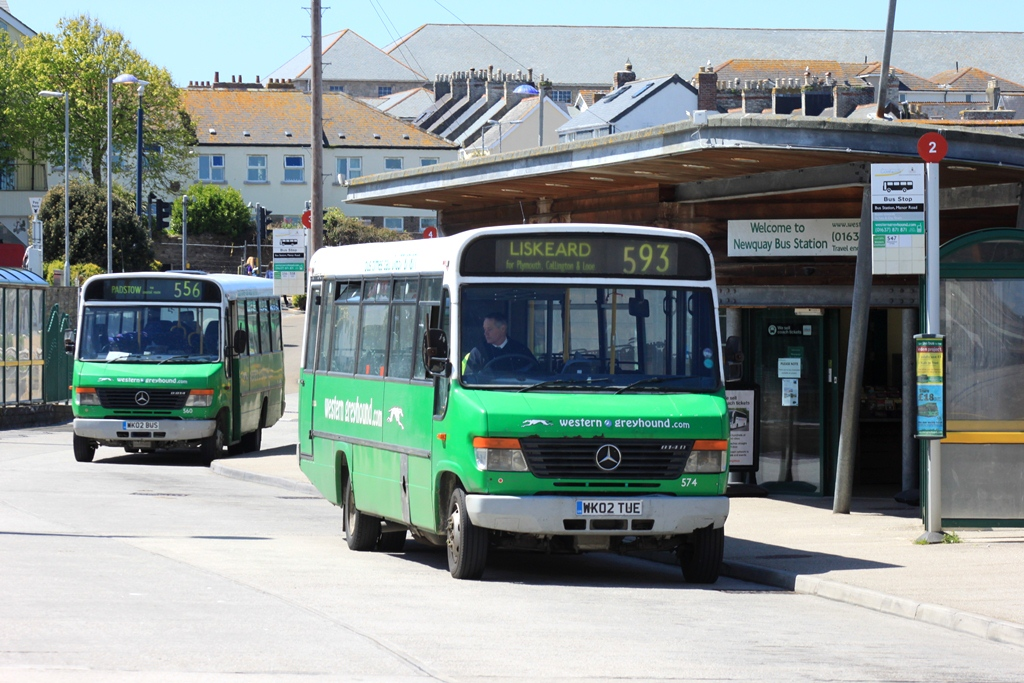
Plaxton Beaver 2 bodied Mercedes-Benz O814s at Newquay bus station in May 2013

Western Greyhound was established in January 1998 to take over the three vehicles and the contracts of Cornishman Coaches, whose owner was retiring. The new company's managing director was Mark Howarth who had previously managed Western National, the local Badgerline (later FirstGroup) operation, and he was joined by Robin Orbell who had also worked for Badgerline. Within a few weeks R&M Coaches, another local operator, also sold out to Western Greyhound which brought one more vehicle and an office near Newquay bus station. This left one other independent bus operator in the town, Pleasure Travel Minicoaches, but this went out of business and the contracts were also taken on by Western Greyhound.

The company expanded beyond contract and private hire work with its first scheduled services on 14 December 1998. These two routes (592 and 594) were contracts awarded by Cornwall Council and were operated by three new minibuses. Further contracts were awarded in 2001, and double decker buses were added to the fleet to operate school routes relinquished by First Devon & Cornwall. After that many more routes were added to the network including some from Plymouth Citybus and DAC Coaches in the south east, and Hookways in the north. There were also some new routes, such as Newquay to Bodmin, two towns which had not previously been directly connected by bus (the service has not survived).

The expanding fleet meant that the company needed a larger depot, and nearby Summercourt was chosen. Initially the depot was on existing premises, but in 2004 a new depot and offices were built. In the same year the ex-Western National bus station in East Street, Newquay was closed on safety grounds and replaced by a new and larger terminal at nearby Manor Road. This is owned by Cornwall Council but was managed on its behalf by Western Greyhound until 2015. Western Greyhound's town centre shop was also moved to the Manor Road site where it became the bus station enquiry office. The company maintained its bus stops and used satellite tracking to monitor its fleet.

In December 2014, the Liskeard based operations were sold to Plymouth Citybus with nine buses, while the remainder of the business was sold to Michael Bishop.

=== Depot fires ===
On 13 May 2013, a serious fire broke out at the Summercourt depot, the alarm being raised just after 01:00. Strong winds fanned the flames which reached more than 50 feet (15 m) height; the fire was put out by 05:00. The fire service prevented it spreading from the parked buses to the workshops or offices and no one was injured. Investigations suggested it was an arson attack. Thirty-four buses (about one-third of the fleet) were destroyed with a value in excess of £1 million. Certain services had to be withdrawn or reduced in frequency for a while but a number of buses were hired from other companies as short-term replacements.

Buses were hired from Anglian Bus, Carmel Coaches, Arriva Midlands, Blackpool Transport, Nottingham City Transport, Norfolk Green, Summercourt Travel, Stagecoach South West and Stagecoach West. All had been returned to their owners by the end of the year.

Another arson attack at the company's Liskeard outstation in January 2014 destroyed three further buses.

=== Cessation ===
Western Greyhound ceased trading on 13 March 2015 citing insurance and financial issues. Western Greyhound's services were taken over by First Devon & Cornwall, Plymouth Citybus and Stagecoach South West.

== Area of operation ==
Western Greyhound was based at Summercourt, near Newquay. It operated throughout Cornwall and into Devon, serving Plymouth, Okehampton and Exeter.

From 2008 until September 2013 Western Greyhound operated the Truro park & ride service under contract to Cornwall Council. This passed to First Devon & Cornwall.

== Fleet ==
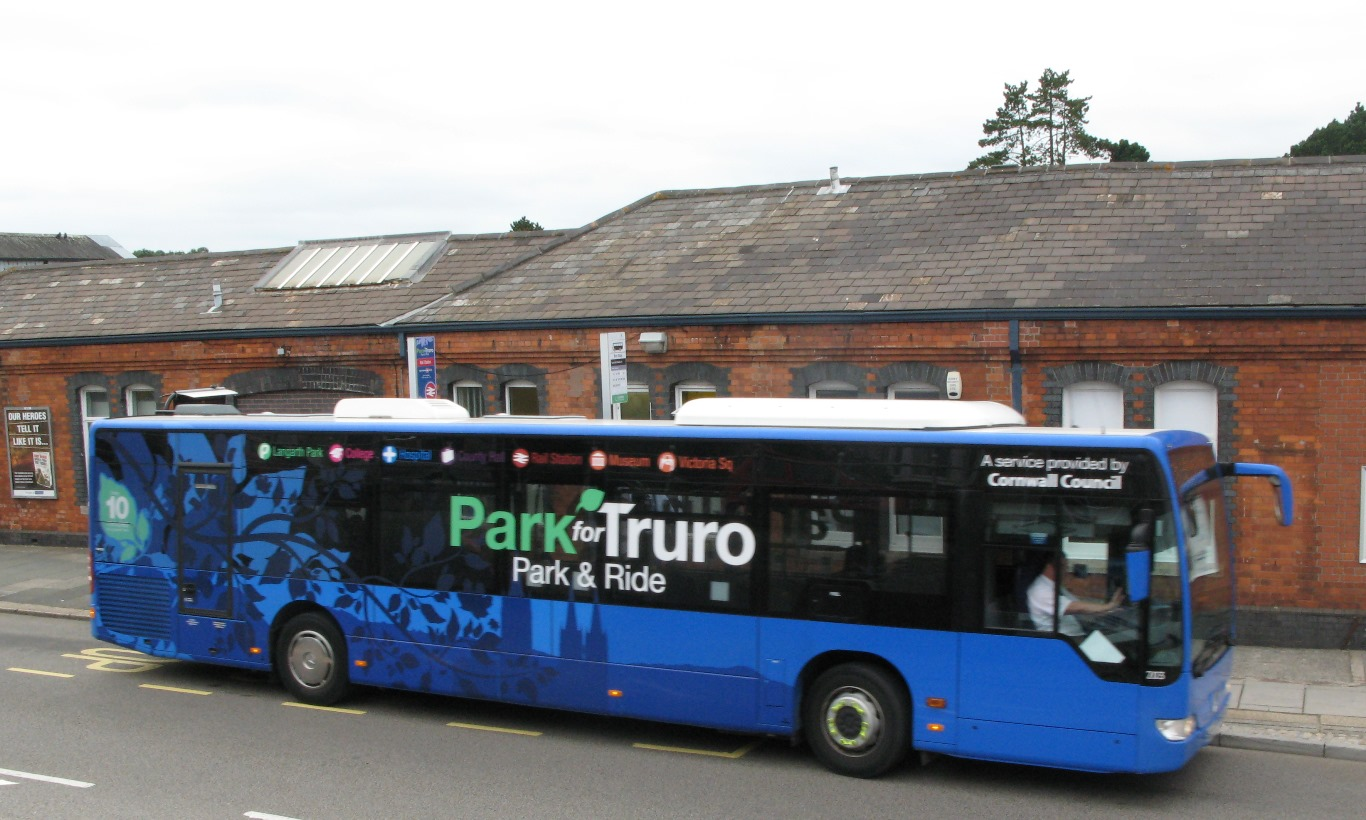
Blue liveried Mercedes-Benz Citaro at Truro railway station in October 2009

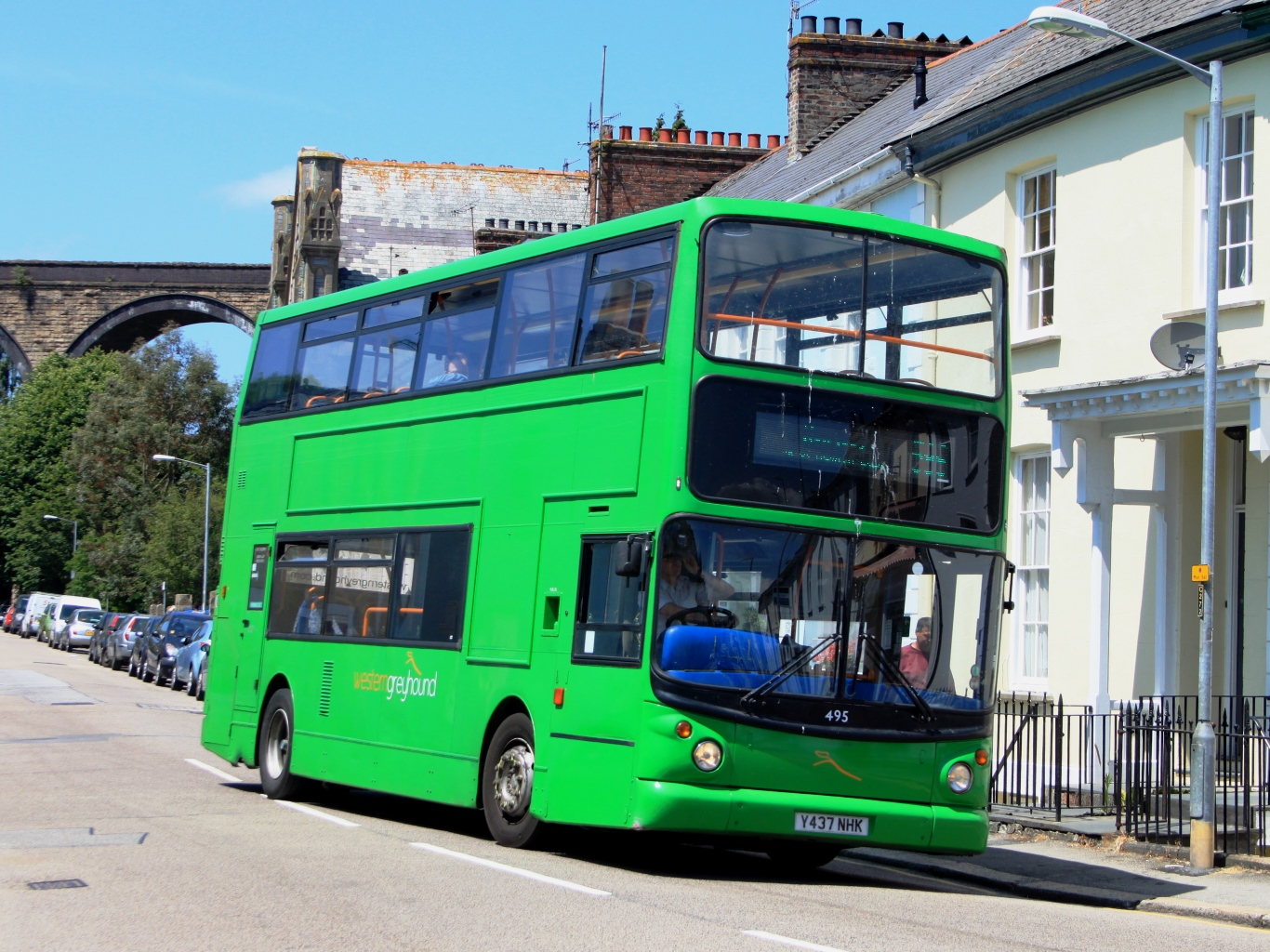
Alexander ALX400 bodied Dennis Trident 2 in Truro

In December 2014, the fleet consisted of 65 buses.

== Liveries ==
Most service buses were painted in a bright green livery. A large fleet name and a greyhound logo was applied in white. One Mercedes-Benz/Plaxton Beaver midibus (599) and an Optare Solo carried a silver livery for a while but in 2012 (599) was repainted into a grey livery to commemorate the Diamond Jubilee of Elizabeth II.

Bright green had not always been the fleet livery. When the services were first introduced the main colour was pink. This was used for several years but when FirstGroup introduced a blue and pink livery to their buses in the area a decision was taken to change the buses to a green livery which was paler than the colour which was used at the end of the company lifespan. The Citaros which used to be used on the Truro Park & Ride service were painted blue.
