= First South West =

Bus operator in South West England

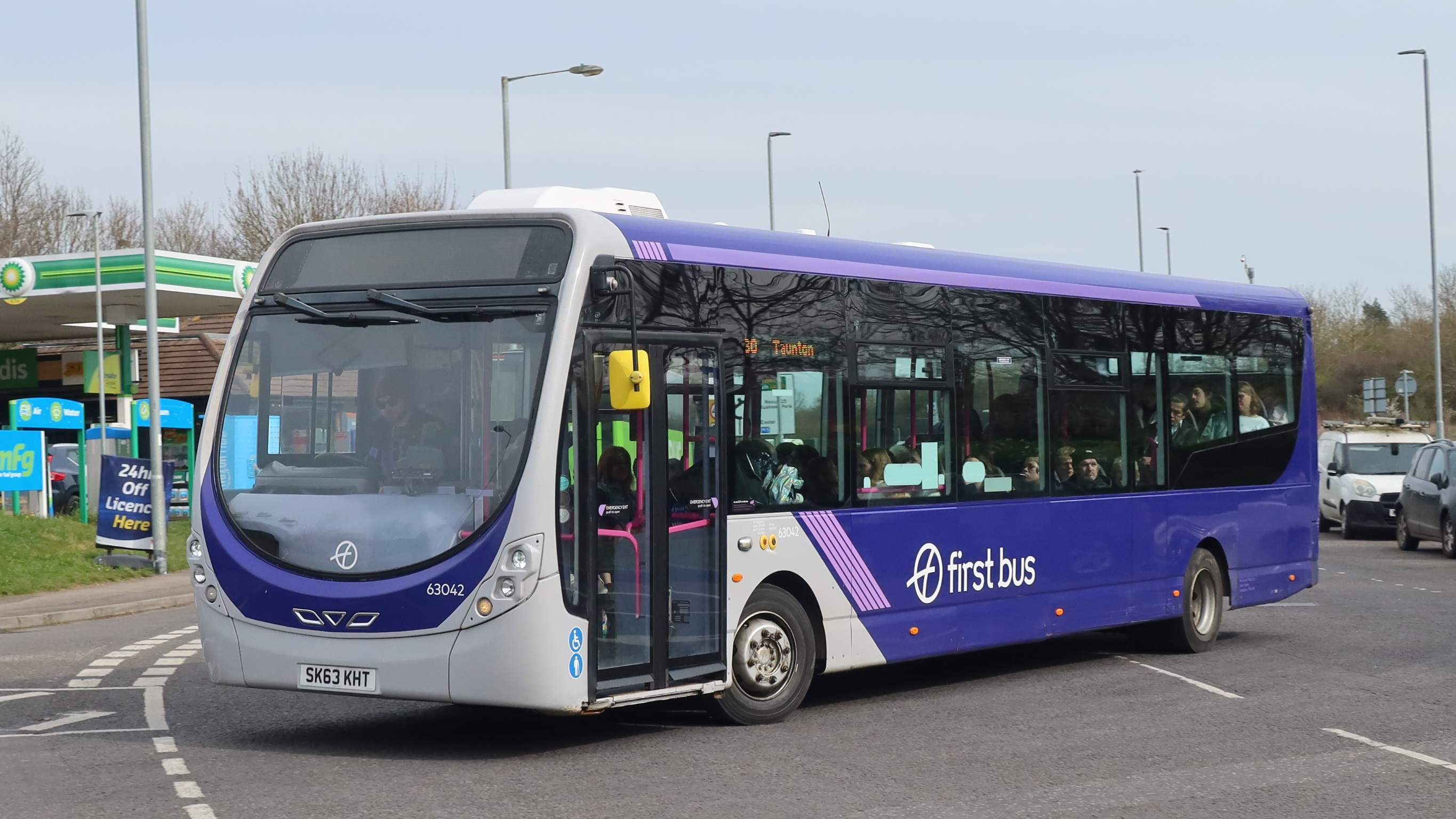
- A Wright StreetLite in Taunton, 2025
- Parent: FirstGroup
- Founded: 2015
- Headquarters: Taunton (Camborne until 2026)
- Service area: Somerset and parts of Devon
- Service type: Bus
- Hubs: Bridgwater, Taunton, Yeovil
- Depots: 2
- Website: www.firstbus.co.uk/somerset

First South West is a subsidiary of FirstGroup which operates bus services in Somerset, England. Some services cross into Devon and until 2026 it also operated from depots in Cornwall.

Until 2025 it included local brands Kernow, Buses of Somerset and Truronian but FirstGroup no longer promotes local brands.

== History ==
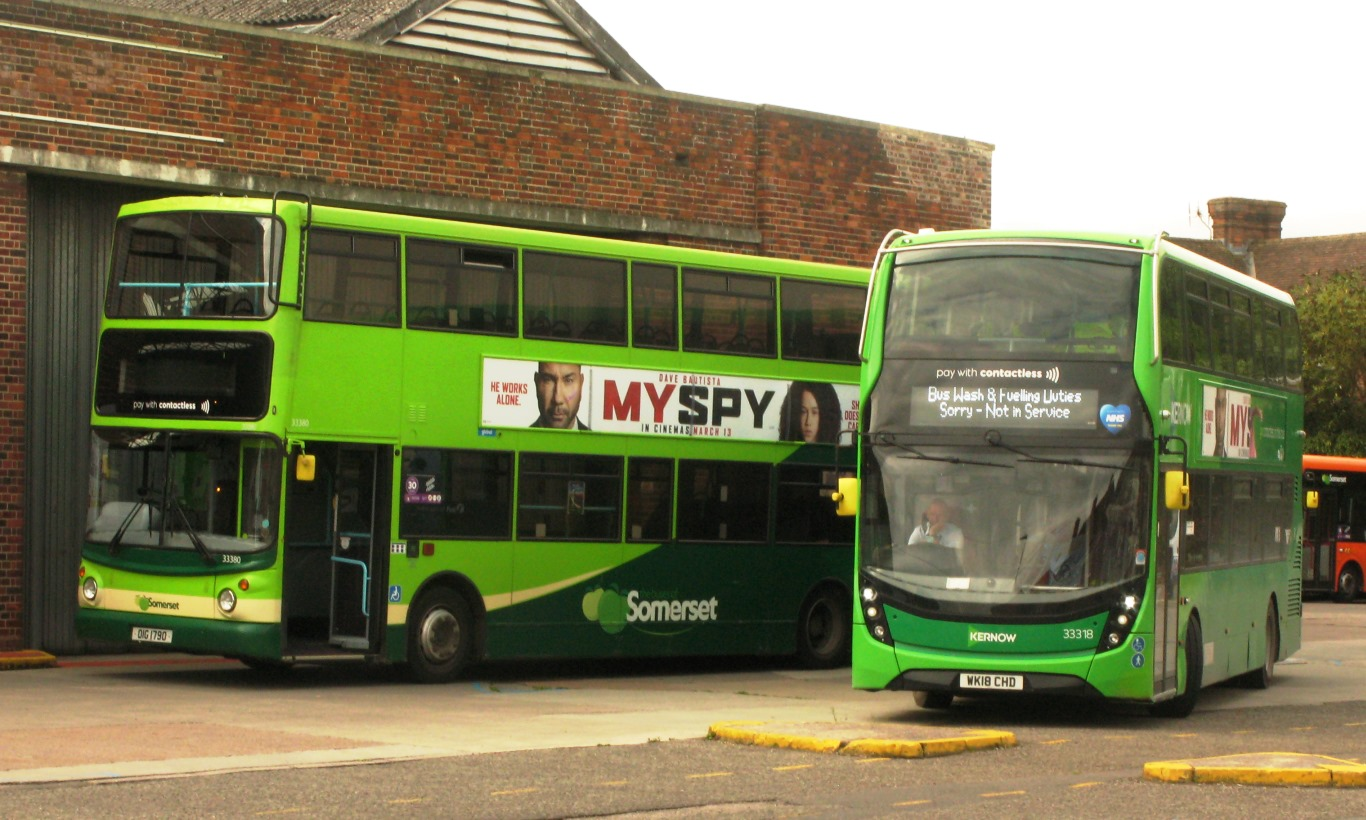
An ALX400 in The Buses of Somerset livery (left) and an Enviro400 MMC in Kernow livery in Taunton, 2020

First South West was known as 'First Devon & Cornwall' until 2015. This had been formed from two previous FirstGroup companies: Western National in Cornwall and south Devon, and Red Bus in north Devon. FirstGroup purchased independent Cornish operator Truronian in April 2008 and merged it into First Devon & Cornwall. First Somerset & Avon routes around Taunton and Bridgwater were transferred to First Devon & Cornwall in 2014 and rebranded as The Buses of Somerset.

On 6 September 2015, the Plymouth, Dartmouth and Tavistock garages were taken over by Stagecoach South West. Torpoint depot was used to store the unused members of the fleet, with it closing after this. At the same time, First Devon & Cornwall changed their name to First South West to reflect their new area of operation which was only in Cornwall and south Somerset.

In January 2020, Cornwall Council awarded the entire tendered bus network within the county to Plymouth Citybus, consisting of 73 routes. Kernow continued to operate their entire commercial network across Cornwall, including Tinner, University, Lizard and Coaster branded routes, as well as the 24, 27, 87 and 91.

From May 2021, First South West launched a number of services under the 'Adventures by Bus' brand across Cornwall, Devon and Somerset. These services were operated commercially and included a number of services that were previously operated by Kernow under different circumstances.

In December 2024, FirstGroup announced that they would be moving away from the majority of locally branded identities within their operating areas as the result of a brand re-focus. This included the Kernow and Buses of Somerset brands operated by First South West, with vehicles and other assets beginning a gradual re-branding process to incorporate the new brand identity.

In November 2025, as a result of financial difficulties, competition by other operators and significant falls in passenger numbers, First South West announced that it was to withdraw from Cornwall entirely on 14 February 2026. Garages and outstations located in Camborne, Falmouth, Penzance, Summercourt and Truro, operating a total of 15 services using a fleet of 85 buses, are to be closed, with up to 275 workers at the depots and outstations being placed at risk of redundancy. First South West's FlixBus operations are unaffected by the closure, while Plymouth Citybus' Cornwall Bus operation launched a replacement network on 15 February

== Area of operation ==
First South West routes cover much of Somerset, mainly in and around Taunton and Bridgwater.

Although the operator is named ‘First South West’, it only operates services in Southern Somerset, with a minority of services operating into Devon. It does not cover the rest of the South West region of England, with these areas being covered by different subsidiaries of the wider FirstGroup business.

Many routes are operated commercially and not under any tender or subsidy by the local council.

First South West, trading as The Buses of Somerset, operated the Taunton Park & Ride service under a contract with Somerset Council signed in 2021. This was due to last for five years, however, First South West informed Somerset Council it no longer finds the route to be viable and ended its commitment in February 2024. The service was taken over by Stagecoach South West.

== Local brands ==
Most First South West services were operated using local branding. FirstGroup announced in December 2024 that it was ending the use of local brands across the country. They were to be phased out as buses and signs were replaced or repainted.

=== Kernow ===
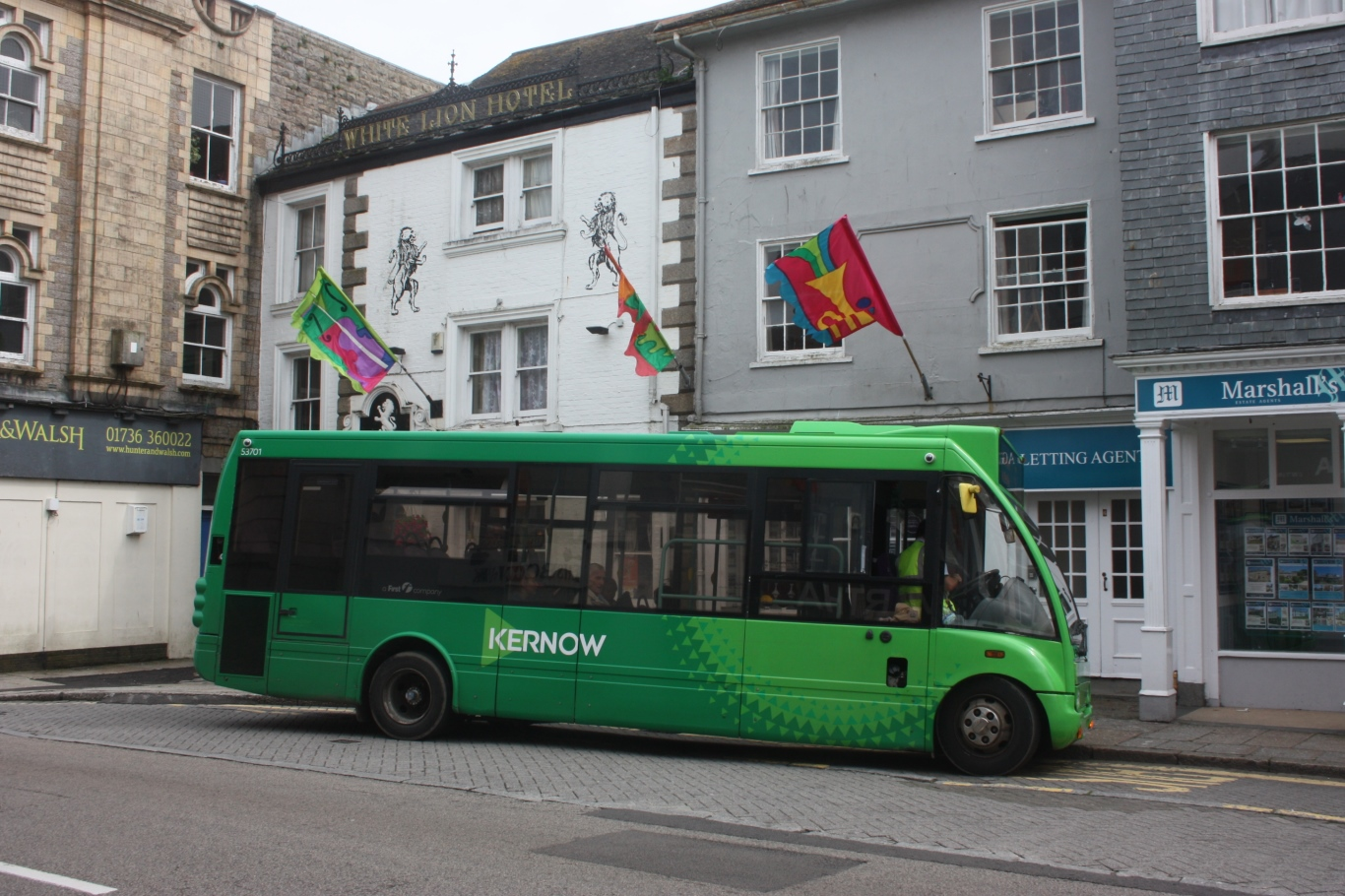
An Optare Solo in Kernow livery (Penzance, 2017)

The Kernow brand was inherited from First Devon & Cornwall when First South West was established in 2015. It operated routes in Cornwall with the headquarters and principal depot at Camborne. Many services were given route-branded buses including the 'Tinner' group of services between Truro, St Ives and Penzance.

=== Buses of Somerset ===
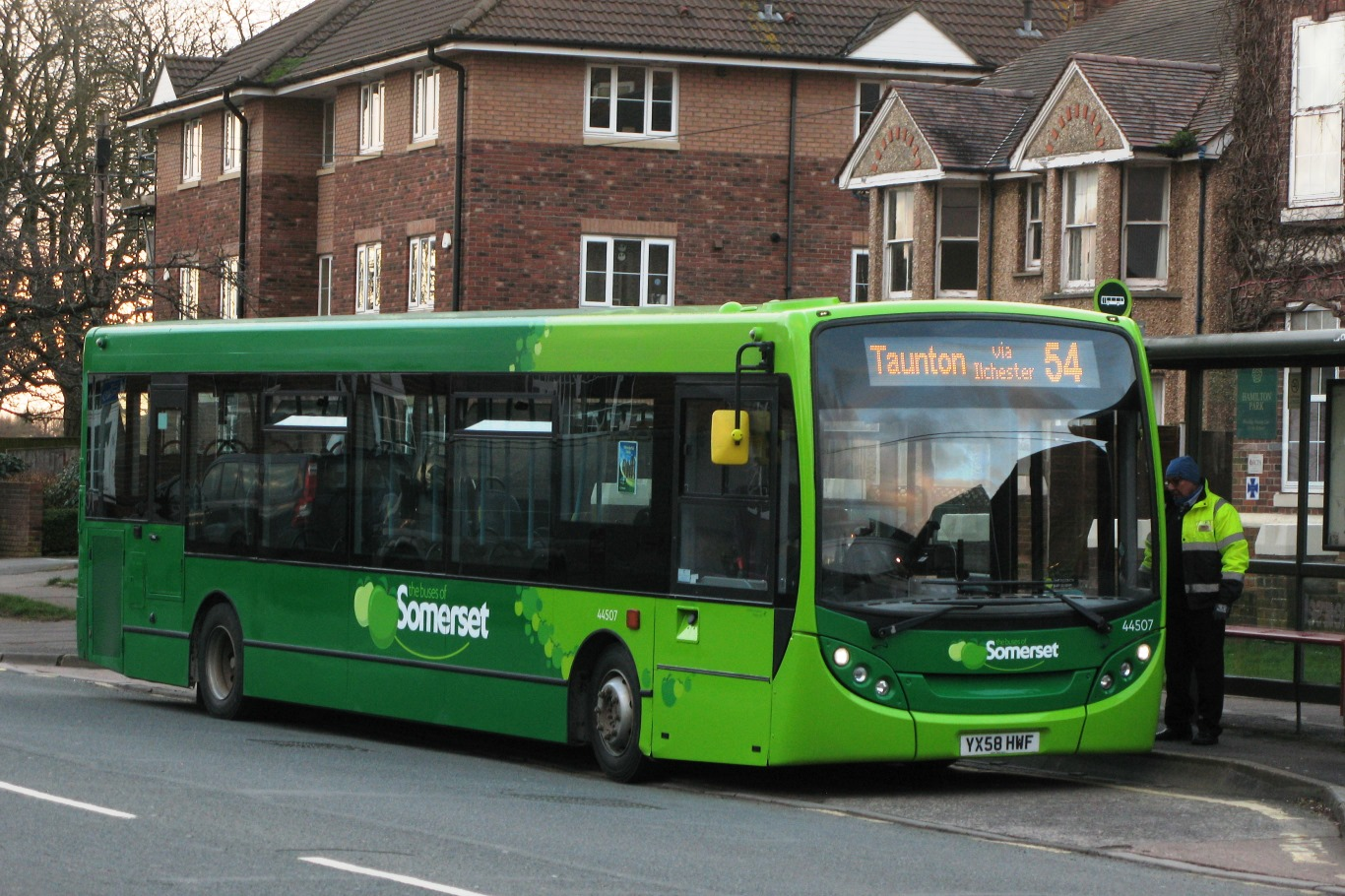
An Alexander Dennis Enviro200 in The Buses of Somerset livery (Taunton, 2021)

The Buses of Somerset brand was used by First Somerset & Avon for services around Taunton and Bridgwater from 2014. The operation was transferred to First South West the following year and later expanded to Yeovil.

=== Truronian ===
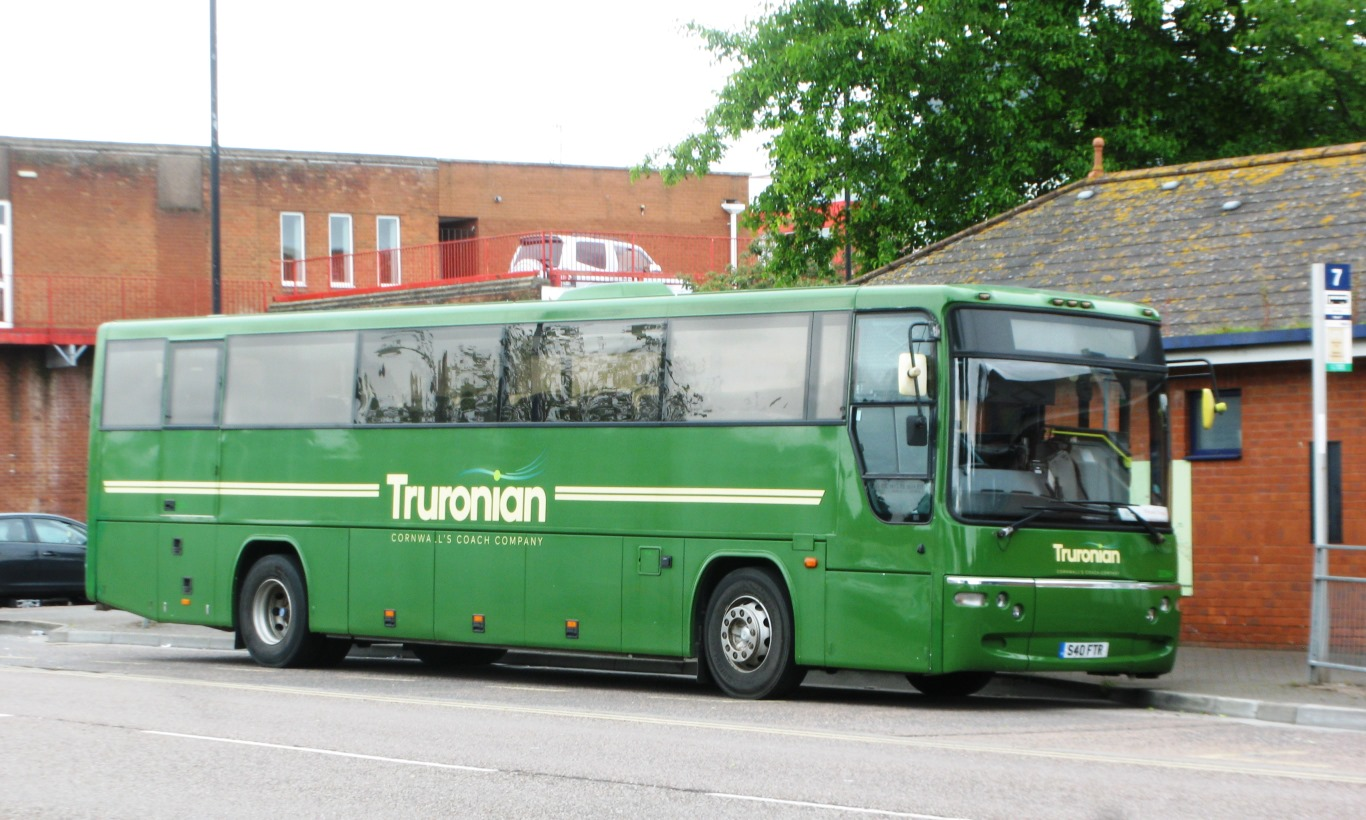
A Plaxton Profile in Truronian livery (Bridgwater, 2024)

Independent operator Truronian was sold to FirstGroup in April 2008. Its 50 buses were absorbed into its Cornish services but its 20 coaches retained the brand for private hire and contract services. These later expanded into Somerset. Truronian was sold to Go South West when First closed its Cornish operations.

=== Adventures by Bus ===
The 'Adventures by Bus' brand operated across First South West's service area from May 2021. It provided many seasonal routes, including the Dartmoor Explorer, Lands End Coaster, Falmouth Coaster, Atlantic Coaster, and Exmoor Coaster services. Many of these services operated using open-top vehicles across the summer season. Adventures by Bus services operated out of various depots and outstations. Adventures by Bus brought First services back to Devon for the first time since September 2015.

Typical vehicle	Service Name	Start	Terminus	Locality	Notes
	Dartmoor Explorer	Plymouth	Exeter	Devon	Operated as a Seasonal route via Yelverton, Princetown, Postbridge, and Moretonhampstead. Ceased operating in 2023.
	Lands End Coaster	Land's End	St Ives	Cornwall	Circular route via Porthcurno, Penzance, Marazion and Sennen previously using open-top vehicles in the summer season. Circular ceased operating before the Summer 2025 season, with Penzance-Land’s End replaced by 1/1A, operated by closed tops.
	Falmouth Coaster	Falmouth Docks	Swanpool	Cornwall	Seasonal circular around Falmouth using open-top vehicles. Ceased operating in 2023.
	Atlantic Coaster	Newquay	Padstow	Cornwall	Seasonal route along the coast between Newquay and Padstow. Previously used open-top vehicles. Ceased before the Summer 2025 season.
	Exmoor Coaster	Minehead	Ilfracombe	Somerset & Devon	Seasonal route via Blue Anchor, Minehead and Exmoor National Park. The only service that continues to operate with open-top vehicles as of the Summer 2025 season.
	Tin Coaster	Penzance	Lower Boscaswell	Cornwall	
	Sunseeker	Gwithian	St Ives	Cornwall	

== Fleet ==
As of April 2019 the fleet consisted of 296 buses and coaches.

First South West used to operate one of the oldest FirstGroup fleets with an average of 11.6 years, but investment in new buses has seen this figure decrease to 9.9 years. New purchases were made in 2016 and 2018 for the now defunct Kernow division. These were ADL Enviro400 MMCs, ADL Enviro200 MMCs and Optare Solo SRs. Most buses are typically second hand from within the FirstGroup fleet. There were previously large fleets of Plaxton Presidents on Volvo B7TL and Dennis Trident 2 chassis and Plaxton Pointer bodied vehicles on a Dennis Dart chassis.

Until December 2006 First South West operated the last sizeable fleet of Bristol VRT double-deck buses in the United Kingdom. Some of these Bristol VRTs have since been preserved.

== Depots ==
- Taunton
- Yeovil

=== Outstations ===
- Minehead

== See also ==
- List of bus operators of the United Kingdom
