= Plaxton Profile =

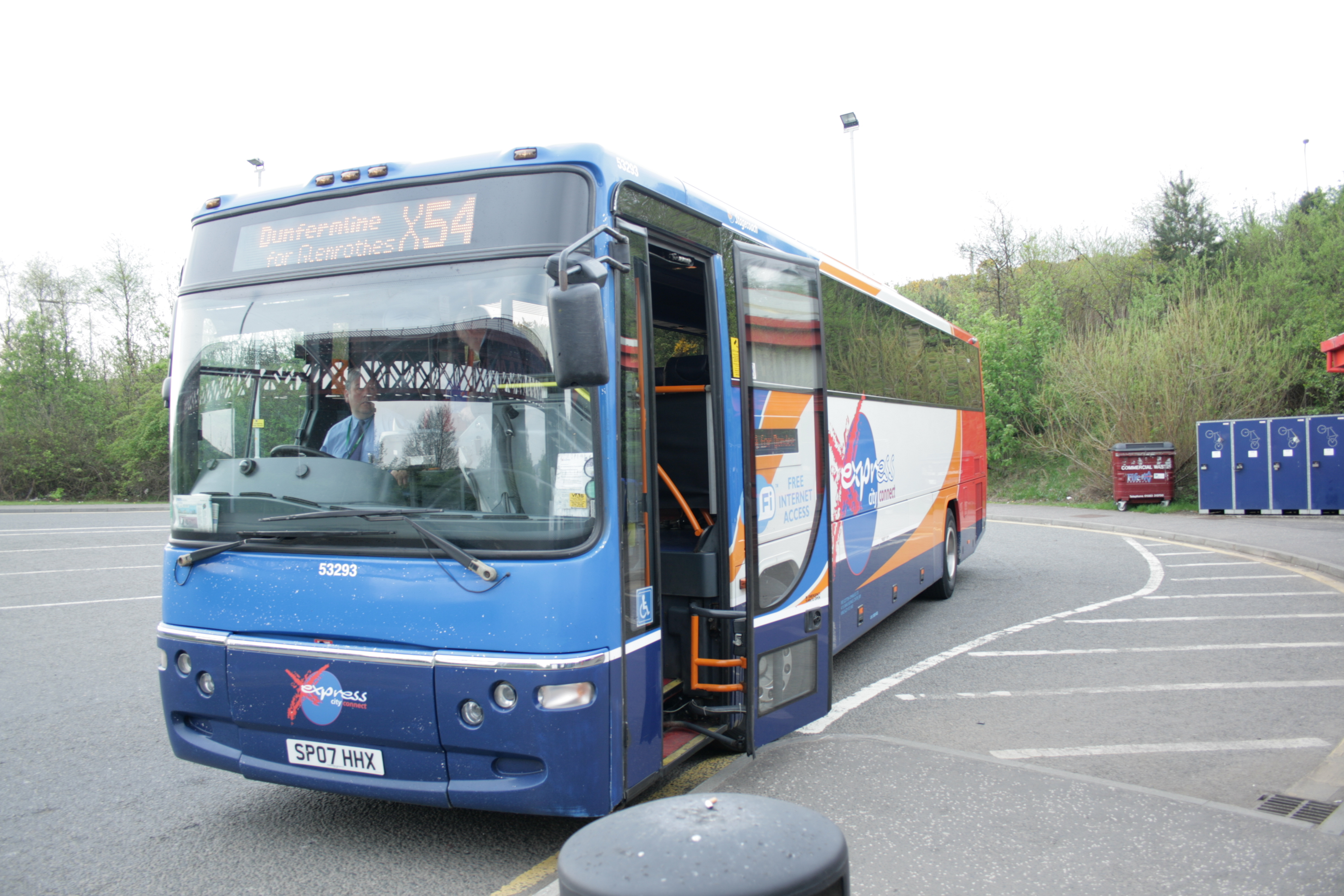
- Stagecoach in Fife Plaxton Profile bodied Volvo B7R at Ferrytoll Park & Ride in May 2013

Overview
- Manufacturer: Plaxton
- Production: 2002 - 2012

Body and chassis
- Doors: 1
- Chassis: Dennis Javelin; Volvo B7R

Chronology
- Successor: Plaxton Leopard

The Plaxton Profile was a coach body manufactured by Plaxton on the Dennis Javelin and Volvo B7R chassis.

It began life as the Premiere 320 which was then updated to the Prima when the Premiere was replaced by the Paragon. The Prima was then modified with the Paragon lower dash panel and rear panel and rechristened the Profile.

It was the first Plaxton coach to meet Disability Discrimination Act 1995 requirements by widening the entrance in order to fit a wheelchair lift. Stagecoach purchased 25 wheelchair accessible Profile bodied Volvo B7Rs following on from a batch of conventional B7Rs.

Warwickshire County Council purchased five Profile bodied B7Rs for its school transport services in 2003. The Profile was not modified to meet the European Commission Whole Vehicle Type Approval with production ceasing in 2012. Its replacement, the Plaxton Leopard, was launched in 2013.
