= Taunton bus station =

Transit building in Taunton, Somerset, England

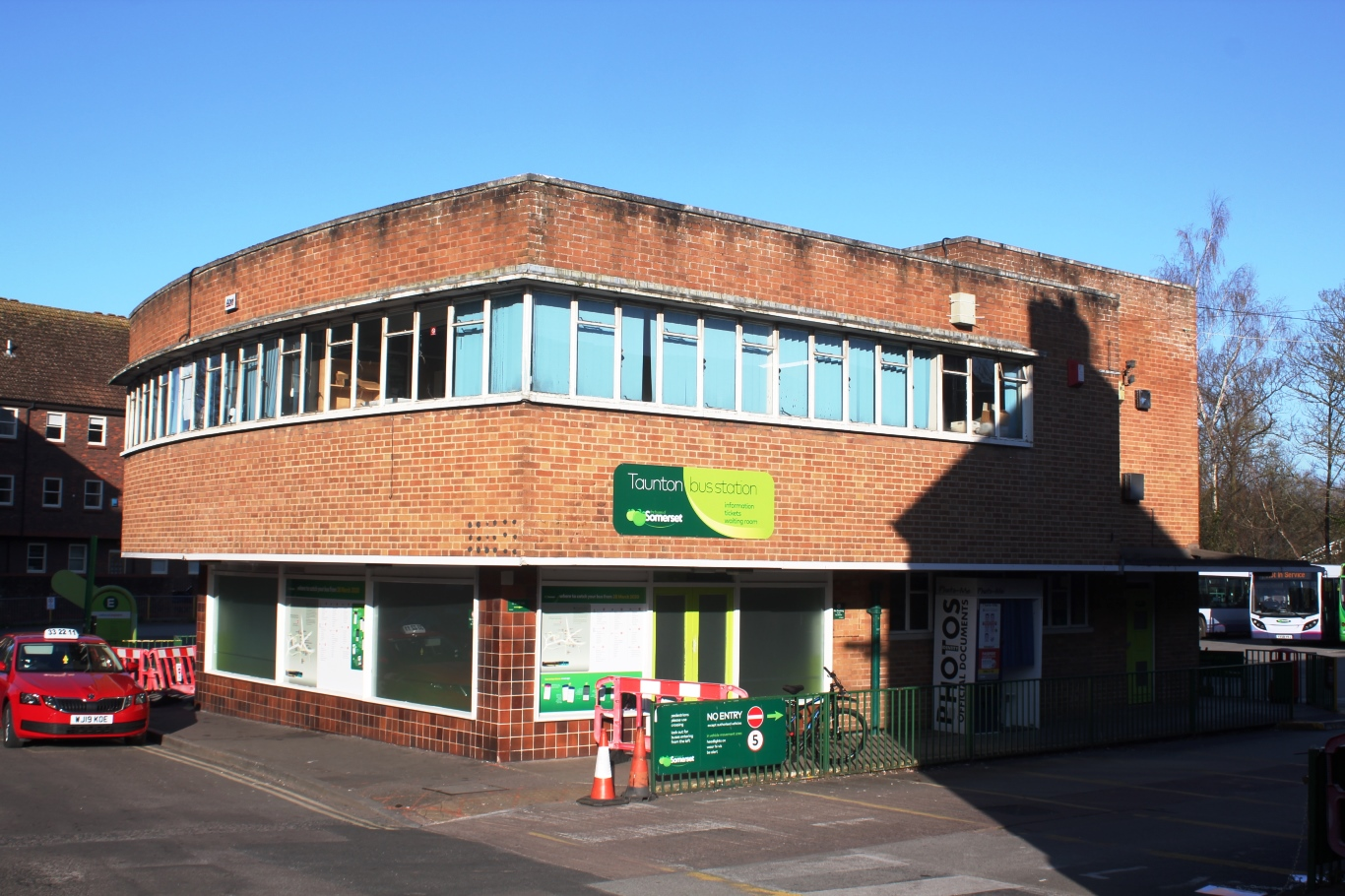

- Location within Somerset

General information
- Status: Closed
- Type: Bus station
- Location: Tower Street, Taunton, England
- Coordinates: 51°00′55″N 03°06′21″W
- Current tenants: The Buses of Somerset
- Completed: 1953
- Opened: 1953
- Closed: 27 March 2020

Design and construction
- Architect: H. A. Starkey

Taunton bus station was situated on Tower Street, Taunton, Somerset, England. It was opened by the Western National Omnibus Company in 1953 and closed in 2020, by which time it was operated by The Buses of Somerset. In 2015 the Transport Trust awarded the station a Red Wheel plaque for its historic value.

== Background ==
The National Omnibus and Transport Company started a service from Taunton to Burnham-on-Sea on 21 July 1920. The following year it began to operate town services in Taunton when the town's single tram line closed due to increases in the cost of electricity. National's operations in Somerset were transferred to the new Western National Omnibus Company (WNOC) when it was set up in 1929.

== History ==
In the 1950s the WNOC started to build town centre bus stations; the first to be approved were at Taunton and Truro in 1949. H.A. Starkey, the architect for the Tilling Group (of which the WNOC was part) designed the Taunton bus station and it was built by F. & E. Small, who tendered £23,041 for the contract. The station opened in 1953 at a site on Tower Street near Taunton Castle. This enabled services to terminate on a dedicated site with passenger facilities rather than at four bus stops around The Parade which was the focal point of the town. As the new bus station was WNOC property, independent operators continued to use their various terminal stops, such as outside the Kings Arms public house in Staplegrove Road beyond the Tone Bridge.

The WNOC and other Tilling Group companies became part of the National Bus Company in 1969 but continued to trade as Western National. In 1983 the bus operations at Taunton passed to a new Southern National (a name previously used by a Western National partner operation in Dorset and east Devon). This company was privatised in 1988, becoming part of FirstGroup in 1999. First Southern National was split up and operations around Taunton were transferred to First Somerset & Avon and rebranded as The Buses of Somerset in 2014 before being transferred to First South West based in Camborne, Cornwall.

The Transport Trust awarded Taunton station a Red Wheel plaque in 2015, describing it as "a rare survivor of a corporate style once common in towns and cities nationwide".

=== Closure ===
The bus station was closed after services on 27 March 2020. The Buses of Somerset stated it would not be economical to perform required upgrades. Later in the year it was sold to the local council for use as a car park, although The Buses of Somerset leased back the offices as they had not found a suitable alternative in the town centre.

Most bus services reverted to the stops on The Parade which had continued to be used by town services but some moved to the stop in Castle Way, a street off Tower Street. Castle Way was used by many independent operators in later years, such as Dartline, Hatch Green, Quantock Motor Services, and South West Coaches, although Berrys Coaches' express service to London makes use of the stop at the King's Arms.

=== Reopening proposal ===
The county council intends to refurbish the site and reopen it as a bus station in 2025. It is currently being used as a NHS vaccination centre.

== Maintenance facilities ==
The site in Tower Street did not have any maintenance facilities. The National company shared a depot with Thomas Motors' "Lavender Blue" buses at the end of South Street from 1920. In 1933 the WNOC bought this company and Dunn's Motor Services which had a depot in the old Bridgwater Road, now known as Hamilton Road. The new owners enlarged the latter site and it continues to be used by The Buses of Somerset.
