= GWR road motor services =

Buses formerly operated by the Great Western Railway in Britain

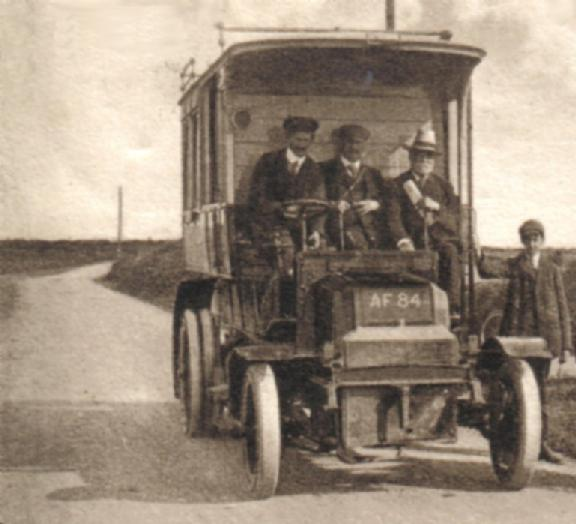
AF84 working a service from Helston to the Lizard in 1904

The Great Western Railway road motor services operated from 1903 to 1933 by the Great Western Railway, both as a feeder to their train services, and as a cheaper alternative to building new railways in rural areas. They were the first successful bus services operated by a British railway company.

== History ==
Faced with an estimate of £85,000 to build a light railway to serve the area south of Helston in Cornwall, the Great Western Railway (GWR) decided to test the market with bus services on the route. They learnt that the Lynton and Barnstaple Railway had been forced by local officialdom to cease using the two buses on their pioneering connection to Ilfracombe and so the GWR bought them to operate a Helston service. The service proved so popular and profitable that further routes were soon established at Penzance and Slough.

By the end of 1904, 36 buses were in operation, 10 more than were in service in London. When the Great Western Railway (Road Transport) Act was passed in 1928 the GWR had the largest railway bus fleet. This Act regularised the railway's operation of road services and also paved the way for them to be transferred out of the railway's control to bus companies, although the railway was to be a shareholder in these companies and there would still be an effort to co-ordinate to road and rail services.

== Vehicles ==
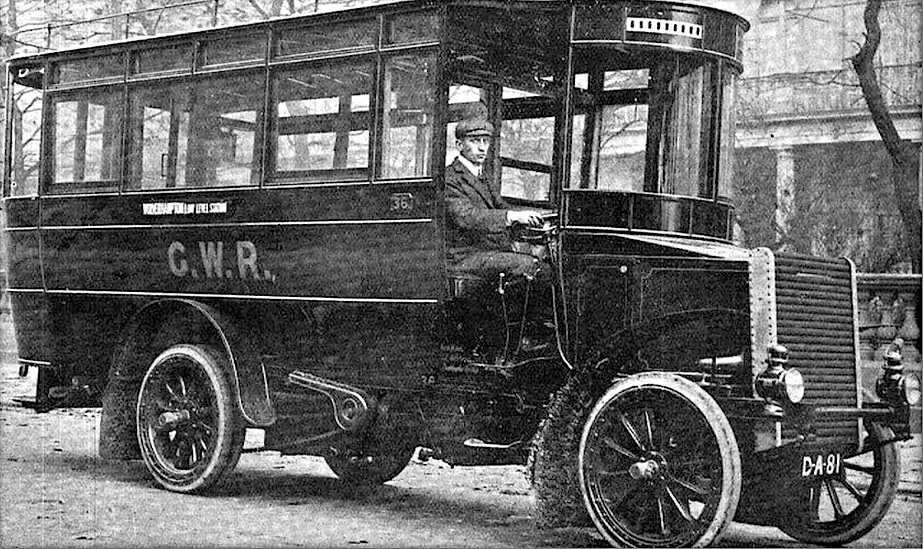
A 1904 Clarkson steam bus

The first vehicles were 16 hp Milnes-Daimler single-deck buses. They were soon supplemented by 20 hp, and later, 30 hp vehicles from the same company. Smaller numbers of vehicles were also supplied by Dennis, Dürkopp, Straker-Squire, and Wolseley, as well as a few Clarkson 20 hp steam buses. Later buses were obtained from AEC, Chevrolet, Daimler, Guy, Leyland, Maudslay, Thornycroft, and a few from Burford, Clement-Talbot, Crossley, Ford, Gilford, Graham Dodge, International, Lancia, Morris, Overland BMT and Vauxhall.

Buses for busier routes were double-deck, while some had luggage compartments for carrying mail bags. For tourist excursions, vehicles – known as "Jersey Cars" – were open, with seats arranged in tiers so that passengers sitting at the back could see over the heads of those in front. More familiar coach types were introduced later and were used on excursions and long-distance "Land Cruises".

== Services in Devon and Cornwall ==
Routes in Devon and Cornwall were transferred to the new Western National Omnibus Company on 1 January 1929, which was half-owned by the Great Western Railway and half by the National Omnibus and Transport Company. Equivalent services are now operated by First South West (in Cornwall) and Stagecoach Devon. In 1929 the railway also took 30% of the shares in the Devon General Omnibus and Touring Company, while the Southern Railway took 20%. At the same time, Western National routes around Bovey Tracey and Moretonhampstead were transferred to Devon General which has since become Stagecoach Devon.

=== Helston and Penzance ===
The first service ran from Helston to The Lizard, connecting with trains at Helston railway station. The service commenced on 17 August 1903, a trial run having been made two days earlier. The service was operated by the railway until the formation of Western National. Other services were operated to Mullion, Ruan Minor, and Porthleven. A Falmouth to Penzance service via Helston was run from 11 July 1921.

A service from Penzance to Marazion had been introduced on 31 October 1903 and ran until 6 August 1916, running beyond Penzance to Newlyn for the first few months. Another service was introduced on 16 May 1904 to St Just which was often extended to Pendeen and Lands End. In 1922 services were introduced from Penzance through St Buryan to Lands End and various villages in the area. Two years later a short-lived service ran to St Ives. In 1925 new services were added from Helston to Redruth, Gweek, St Keverne, Manaccan.

Bus services today at Penzance continue to use a bus station adjacent to Penzance railway station.

=== Plymouth and the South Hams ===
A service from Plymouth to Modbury was introduced later in 1904, with several local services from Modbury to Aveton Gifford, Yealmpton, Bigbury-on-Sea, and Ivybridge. They also ran through Kingsbridge to Salcombe and Dartmouth. Further routes from Kingsbridge ran to Totnes, Newton Abbot, Thurlestone and Hope Cove.

A Plymouth to Roborough route ran from 12 September 1904 until 6 August 1916. Buses were kept underneath the viaduct upon which Plymouth Millbay railway station was built.

=== Torquay and Paignton ===
A service was introduced along the sea front, linking Paignton with Torquay on 11 July 1904. Another route was established from Paignton to Totnes on 20 April 1905, as well a short-lived one to Brixham, and seasonal tours.

The bus station at Paignton is still opposite Paignton railway station.

=== Redruth ===
Services from Redruth started on 29 July 1907 with a route to Falmouth. A network was established over the coming years that reached to Portreath, Illogan, St Day, Carharrack, St Keverne, and Helston.

The corrugated iron railway bus garage still stands behind Redruth railway station, although no longer used for its original purpose.

=== St Austell ===
The first services from St Austell were that to St Columb Road via St Dennis on 3 August 1908 and to Bugle and Bodmin the following month. Other routes were added to Charlestown, Pentewan (3 August 1908), Newquay (29 May 1910), Truro (1911), Trenarren (1 August 1911), St Blazey, Treviscoe (2 October 1911), Par (1 October 1920), Tywardreath and Fowey, also Portscatho (9 October 1923), Mevagissey (17 December 1923), Gorran Haven, Roche (9 July 1928).

The bus station at St Austell is still situated outside St Austell railway station in what used to be the railway goods yard.

=== Other services ===
A service ran from Saltash railway station to Callington from 1 June 1904 to test the market for a proposed light railway, but continued as a bus service until 30 September 1911.

Moretonhampstead railway station was a focal point for tours on Dartmoor, and a regular service to Chagford ran from 9 April 1906 until 31 December 1928. Other routes in the area ran from Bovey railway station to Newton Abbot and tourist spots such as Widecombe-in-the-Moor and Haytor.

== Services elsewhere in England ==
=== Slough ===
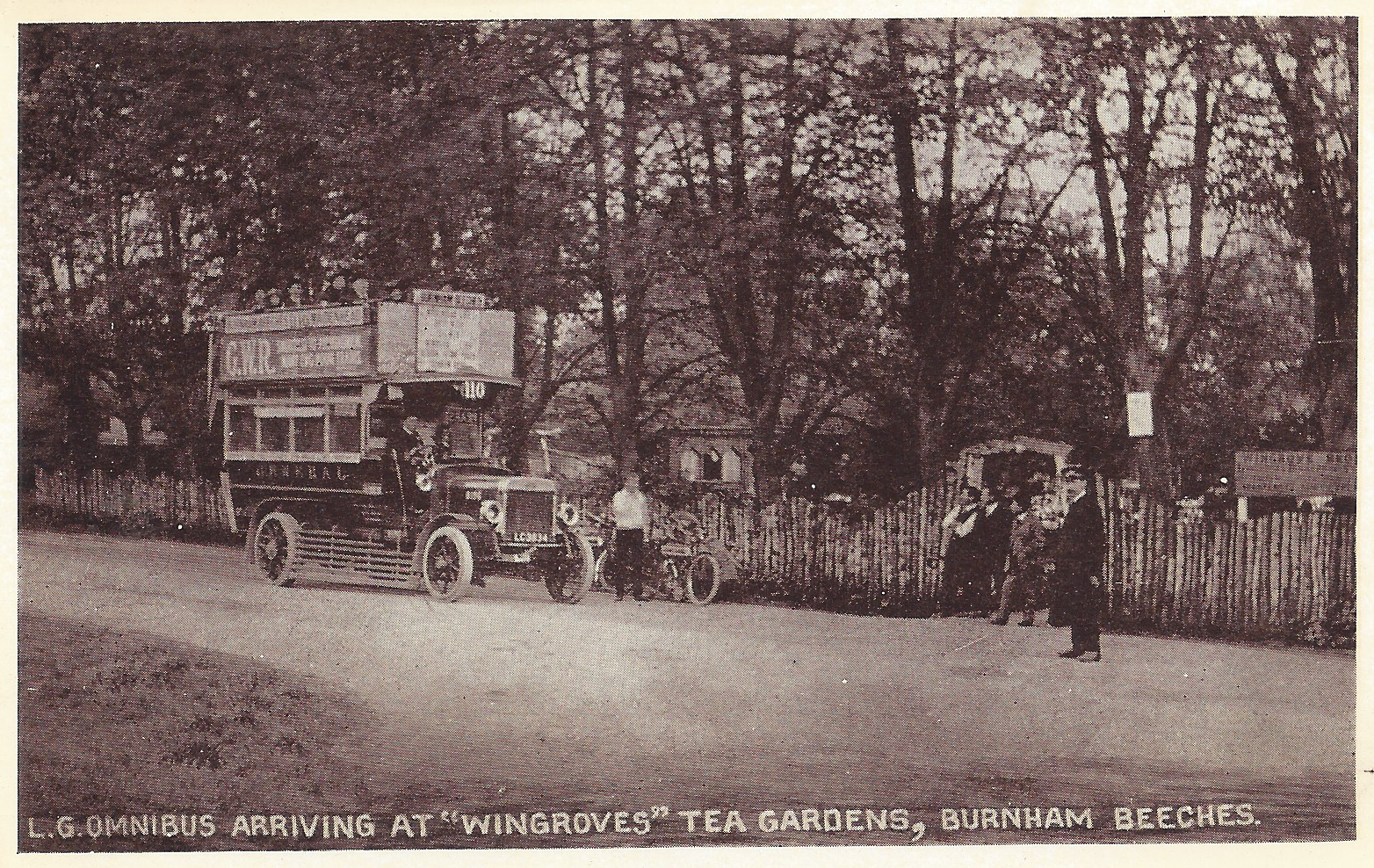
GWR Omnibus at Burnham Beeches near Slough, circa 1914

One of the railway's earliest routes was that from Slough railway station to Beaconsfield, Buckinghamshire, opened on 1 March 1904. Routes to Windsor followed on 18 July 1904 and to Burnham Beeches on 1 May 1908, extended to Taplow in 1927.

=== Cotswolds ===
Services from Stroud railway station were introduced on 9 January 1905 to link with steam rail motor services in the area. Routes linked Stroud with Cheltenham. The Stroud area services were transferred to Western National in 1929. There were also services from Cheltenham to Bishops Cleeve and Winchcombe, later transferred to Bristol Tramways. In 1927 some new routes were started from Pershore. In the following year a long cross-country route from Cheltenham to Oxford was started to connect Cheltenham to the London trains at Oxford, more direct than the all-rail route to London. The service was transferred to Bristol Tramways in 1932.

=== Somerset ===
Some steam buses were tried at Highbridge railway station to work a Burnham-on-Sea to Cheddar service during 1905. The following year a number of services were tried that radiated from Bridgwater, but all had been withdrawn by the end of 1911.

Services were run in Weston-super-Mare along the sea front to the Old Pier and Sand Point, and up the hill to Worlebury. Commencing on 8 July 1928, they continued under GWR operation until 19 July 1931 when they were transferred, along with some routes in Portishead, to Bristol Tramways, which is now First West of England.

=== Other services ===
A route from Wolverhampton to Bridgnorth was operated for a short while from 7 November 1904 using steam buses, and was restarted the following year with motor buses. Stourbridge was linked with Bromsgrove, a town on the Midland Railway, on 13 February 1905.

In the Weymouth area, services started in 1905 jointly with the London and South Western Railway. These, the last services operated by the railway, were transferred to the Southern National company on 1 January 1934.

Other routes could be found at Banbury, Frome, Hungerford, Maidenhead, Marlborough, Newbury, Swindon, and Wantage.

Routes were transferred to various local companies, with the railway taking a shareholding to allow it to exert an influence over the bus services, although routes were often transferred over a period of several months following the signing of the agreements on the dates given. Companies involved were the Birmingham and Midland Motor Omnibus Company (Midland Red – 1 January 1930), City of Oxford Motor Services (28 February 1930), Thames Valley Traction (1 January 1931), although some of those at Slough went to London General Country Services on 10 April 1932. Routes around Swindon were transferred to Bristol Tramways.

== Services in Wales ==
Services started from Wrexham on 11 October 1904. Routes radiated from many stations, including Aberavon, Abergavenny, Aberystwyth, Brecon, Cardigan, Carmarthen, Corwen, Neath, Newcastle Emlyn, New Quay, Oswestry, and St David's.

Services in south and west Wales transferred to the new Western Welsh Omnibus Company on 1 August 1929, which was half-owned by the railway. Services in the north became "Western Transport" from 3 November 1930, which was amalgamated with the London, Midland and Scottish Railway-backed Crosville Motor Services on 1 May 1933. This is now Arriva Buses Wales.
