= Devon General =

British bus operating company

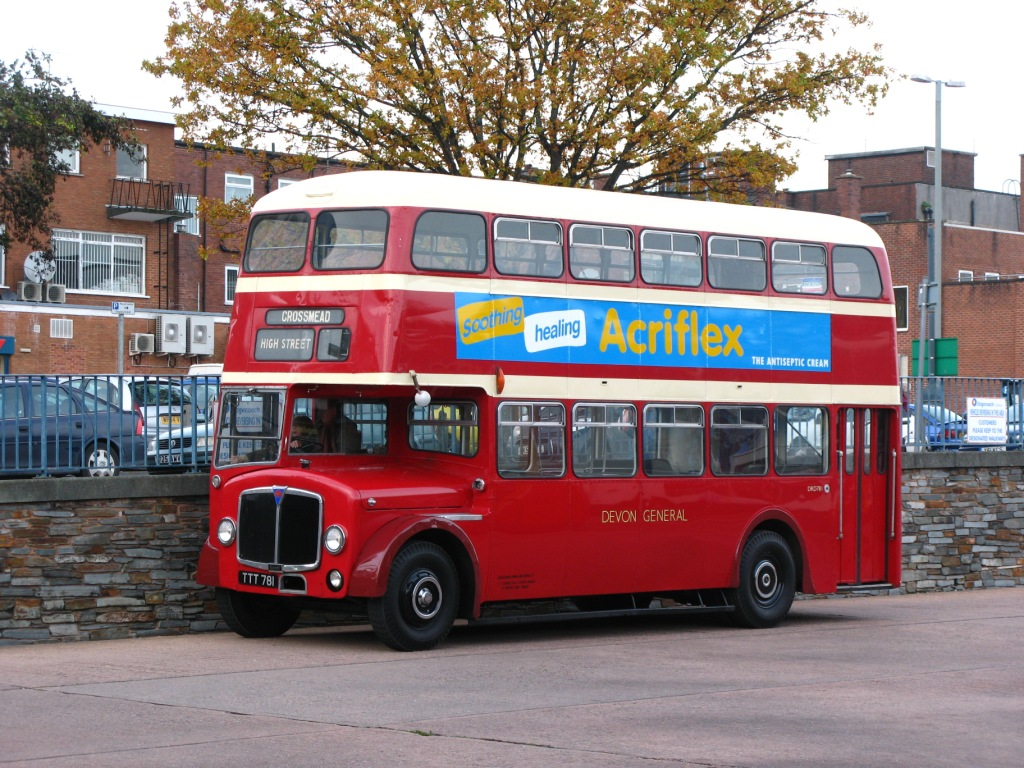
- Preserved Metro Cammell bodied AEC Regent V in Exeter in November 2011
- Parent: British Electric Traction
- Founded: 1919
- Defunct: 1996
- Headquarters: Torquay, later Exeter
- Service area: Devon
- Service type: Bus operator
- Hubs: Exeter, Torbay
- Depots: Exmouth, Exeter, Torquay. Outstations at Newton Abbot, Crediton, Sidmouth

Devon General was the principal bus operator in south Devon from 1919. The name was first used by the Devon General Omnibus and Touring Company which was created in 1919. In 1922 it was purchased by the National Electric Construction Company which merged with British Electric Traction in 1931. Nationalisation in 1969 resulted in 1971 with the company being merged into Western National. In 1983 a new Devon General Limited was created which became the first operating subsidiary of the National Bus Company to be privatised in 1986 when it became the first company of Transit Holdings. It was sold to the Stagecoach Group in 1996 and renamed Stagecoach Devon in 2003.

Coaches were operated under various names, principally Fleet Cars from 1925 until 1933, and Grey Cars from 1932 until 1971.

Its main principal depots were in Exeter and Torquay, but the area of operation covered most of south, east and mid Devon.

== History ==
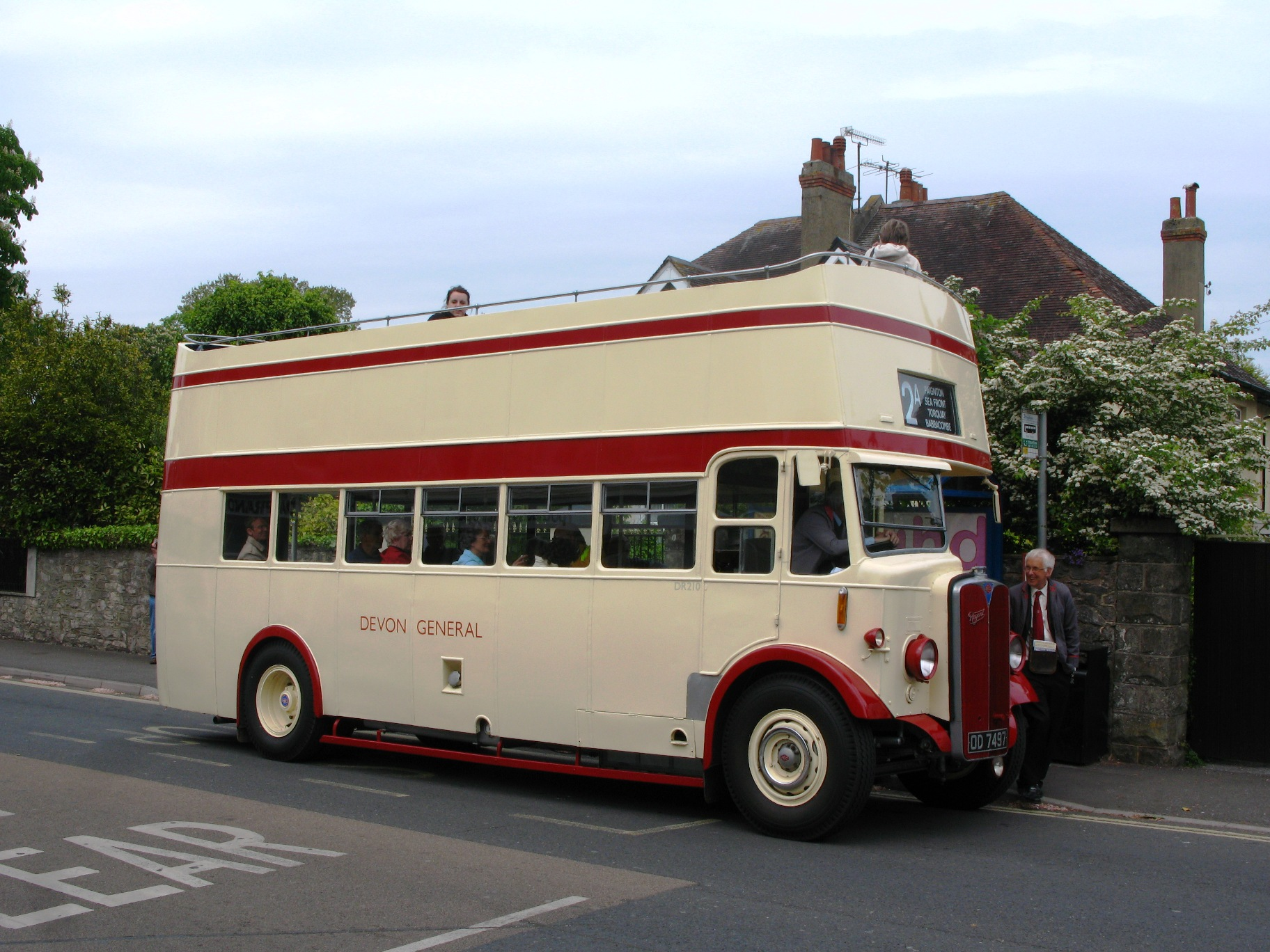
An open top bus used in Torbay from 1955 to 1961

The Devon General Omnibus and Touring Company started operations in south Devon in 1919 with two bus routes from Exeter to Torquay. In 1922 Torquay Tramways bought the company for £36,000, although it was operated as a subsidiary of the National Electric Construction Company (NECC) and the motor buses already owned by the tramway company were transferred to Devon General. Some charabanc tours had been operated by the Torquay Tramways and this continued under Devon General. A local independent company that traded as Fleet Cars was purchased in 1925 but continued to operate as a separate business for a few seasons, during which time a number of other small operators were also acquired and merged with Fleet Cars.

In 1931 the NECC became a part of British Electric Traction (BET). The Torquay tram network was closed in January 1934. The Tramways company was sold to Devon General, the fleet of which was enlarged by 24 buses to allow it to operate the former tram routes.

Devon General had turned down the chance to buy local independent coach operator Grey Cars in 1930 so it had instead been purchased by A Timpson & Sons of Catford in 1931. Timpsons sold the business to Devon General in 1932 and the following year both Grey Cars and Fleet Cars, which had been operated as separate businesses, were merged into Devon General. Most coaches continued to operate under Grey Cars' name, although some small operators that were subsequently bought out by Devon General continued in their old names for a while.

=== National Bus Company ===
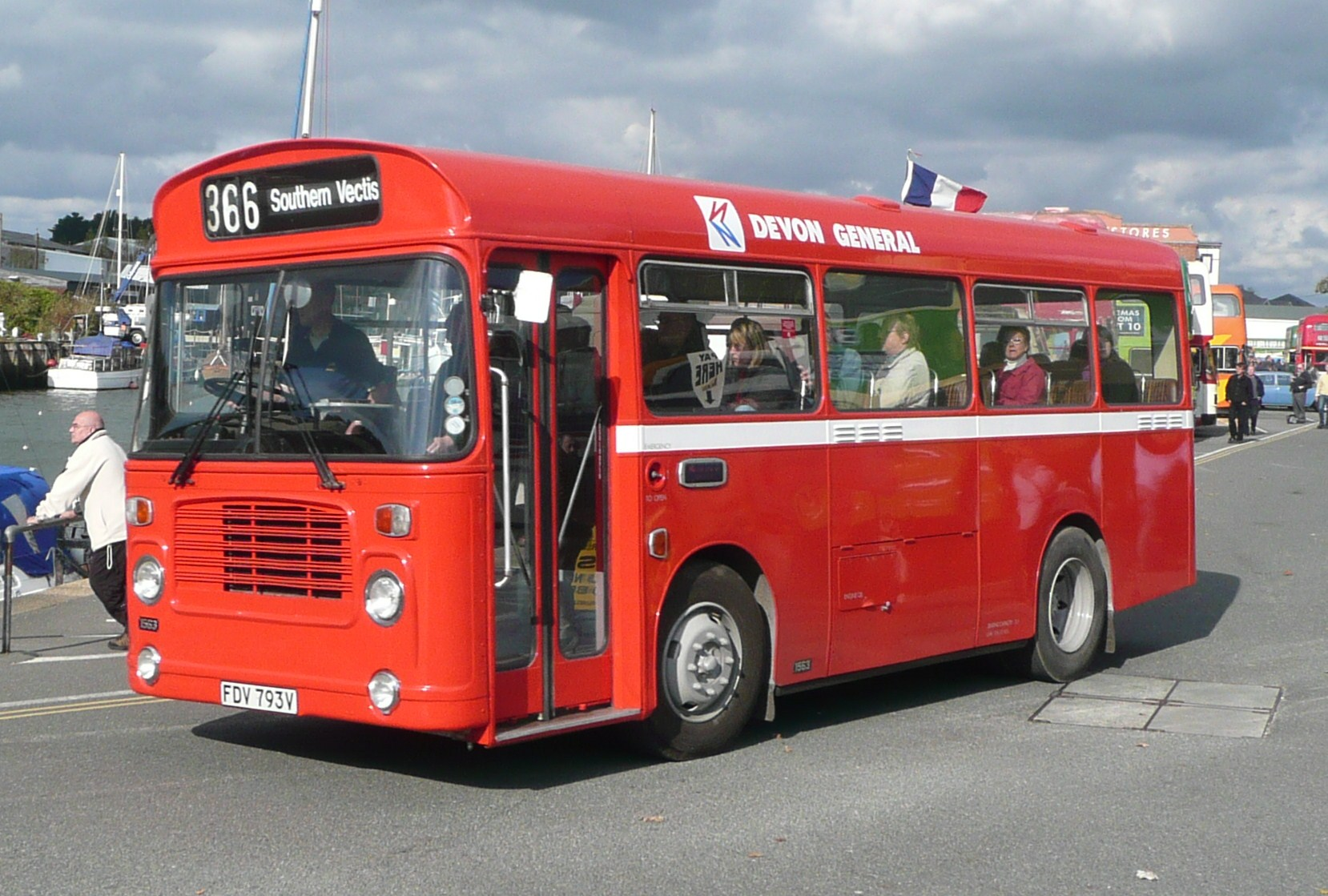
Preserved Bristol LH in Devon General National Bus Company livery in October 2008

BET's bus operations, including Devon General, became part of the National Bus Company (NBC) when it was formed on 1 January 1969. Devon General had worked closely with the Corporation of Exeter's bus services since 1947. In April 1970 the corporation's buses and routes were transferred to the NBC and merged into Devon General. The city's unusual use of route letters (as opposed to numbers) continued.

In January 1971, the NBC transferred the bus operations of Devon General to neighbouring Western National but the Devon General name was retained as a brand, while the Grey Cars coaching operation was transferred to Exeter-based Greenslades. NBC split Western National into four new companies on 1 January 1983, one of which was Devon General Limited. This operated in south and east Devon as the old Devon General had done, but the Tiverton area became a part of a new North Devon operation.

=== Transit Holdings ===
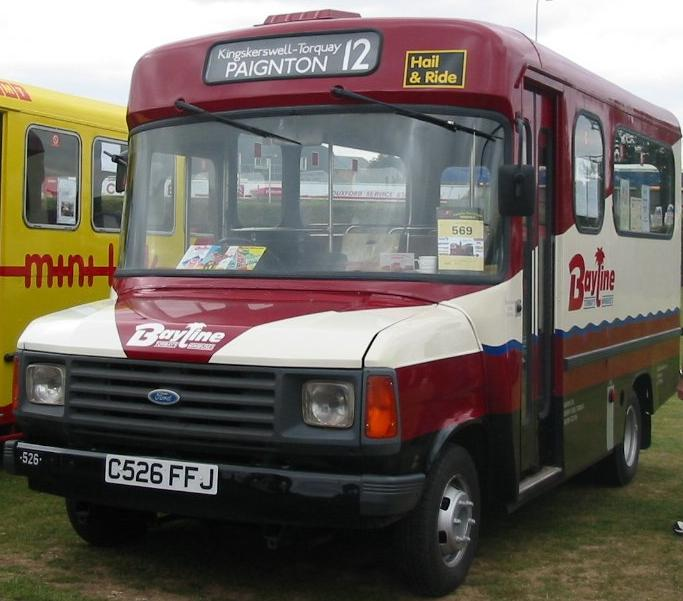
Preserved Bayline Carlyle bodied Ford Transit in March 2008

On 19 August 1986, Devon General became the first NBC operating subsidiary to be privatised under the Transport Act 1985 by being sold in a management buyout led by managing director Harry Blundred.

An experimental high-frequency service using 22 minibuses had been introduced in Exeter on 27 February 1984. By the time the company was privatised in August 1986, the minibus fleet had expanded to more than 200 vehicles, more than half the buses in service. By the end of 1990 all regular services had been converted to minibus operation using a mixture of 16 and 24-seat vehicles.

The new owners of Devon General formed Transit Holdings to operate number of other bus companies, most of them in southern England:

- Bayline (Torquay)
- Devon General (Exeter)
- Docklands Transit (London)
- Portsmouth Transit (Portsmouth)
- Thames Transit (Oxford)
- Transit Australia

Bayline was established in 1992 for the operations in Torbay and Newton Abbot, after which Devon General operated in the Exeter area. Both companies were sold to the Stagecoach Group in 1996, and became Stagecoach Devon in 2003.

== Area of operation ==
Devon General quickly expanded beyond its original routes between Exeter, Newton Abbot and Torquay. A number of small operators were bought out (see below), but area agreements with larger neighbours set out the company's area of operation. While the boundaries changed in detail from time to time, the area was largely set out in two agreements.

- In 1922 an eastern boundary was agreed with the National Omnibus and Transport Company along the road from Minehead via Tiverton, Cullompton and Honiton to Sidmouth.
- In 1924 a northern boundary was agreed with Hardy Central Garage between Okehampton, Bampton and Wellington.
- By 1929 the western boundary had settled at Kingswear, Totnes, Buckfastleigh and Okehampton, with Western National having control beyond.

== Offices and depots ==
Most of the directors of the Devon General Omnibus and Touring Company came from the London area and so the company offices were established in a house Kilmore Road, Forest Hill, London. The first buses were housed at the Exeter Garage Company's premises in Paris Street, Exeter. In 1921 the offices were moved to the new garage that was being constructed at Blackboy Road in Exeter, but the takeover by the NECC the following year saw the office moved back to Queen Street in the city of London.

The merger of NECC with BET in 1932 saw the Queen Street office closed in favour of BET's headquarters in Kingsway, London. At around this time work started on the construction of a new large garage and central workshops at Newton Road in Torquay. The BET headquarters were moved across London to Piccadilly in 1952 but in 1956 the registered offices of Devon General were moved to the garage at 87 Newton Road, Torquay.

When Devon General was absorbed into Western National in 1971, all the office work was moved to the latter company' offices in Queen Street, Exeter. The newly independent Devon General Limited of 1983 chose to remain in Exeter, but moved into offices in Belgrave Road where a new bus depot had opened in 1975.

Buses were based in garages or open yards at

- Ashburton
  - Dropping Wells 1925–1927
  - West Street (Blue Saloon Motor Services) 1927–1928
- Brixham
  - New Road 1935–1939
  - Mount Pleasant Road 1940–1957
  - Bus Station 1957–1992
- Crediton
  - Unknown site 1928?–1931
  - Mill Street 1931–1954
- Exeter
  - Gold's Garage, Heavitree Road 1919–1921
  - Blackboy Road 1921–1971
  - Heavitree Road (Exeter Corporation) 1970–1975
  - Belgrave Road 1975–(1996)
- Exmouth
  - New Street 1921–1931
  - Imperial Road 1931–(1996)
- Moretonhampstead
  - Station Road June – September 1924
  - Steven's Garage, Chagford 1924–1928?
  - Court Street 1928–1971 Moved to a different site in Court Street in 1931
- Newton Abbot
  - Bradley Hotel 1919–1921
  - Newton Road, Kingsteignton 1921–1960
  - Kingsteignton Road 1960–1992
- Paignton
  - Roundham Road 1923–1925
  - Churston 1925–1930
  - Orient Road, Preston 1924–1932
  - Bus Station 1988–(1996) The bus station opened in 1954
- Sidmouth
  - Mill Street 1922–?
  - Station Road, Newton Poppleford ?–1930
  - Woolbrook 1930–1996
- Tiverton
  - Chapel Street (Croscols) 1924–1938
  - Old Road 1938–1971 After 1971 buses were kept at the bus station.
- Torquay
  - Westhill Avenue (Torquay Tramways) 1922–1931
  - Newton Road 1931–1988
  - Torwood Street (Grey Cars) 1933–1940 and 1946–1971
  - Belgrave Road (Court Garages) 1940–1946 and 1966–1973
  - Regents Close 1992–(1996)

One or two buses were also kept at a number of other towns and villages such as Axminster (1922–1924, 1927–1984), Budleigh Salterton (1930–1939, 1988–1989), Crockernwell (1942–1957), Cullompton (1922–1996), East Budleigh 1921–1931, Kenton (1942–1947), Okehampton (1923–1997), Ottery St Mary (1927–1938, 1949–1967), Tiverton Junction (1955–1977), Uffculme (1942–1954).

== Livery ==
The first buses were painted in red with cream relief. Coaches were generally grey with deep red relief and open top buses (introduced in 1955) were given a cream livery with red relief.

In 1972 NBC imposed a standard poppy red colour with white relief, but from 1979 Devon General buses started to be painted in leaf green and white, the same colours as the parent Western National fleet. Six months after the operation became independent of Western National in 1983 a red livery was again adopted. The first minibuses were painted in bright red and yellow colours with a black skirt.

To coincide with privatisation in 1986 a new livery was introduced. Buses were painted an ivory colour with red skirt and lower deck window surrounds.

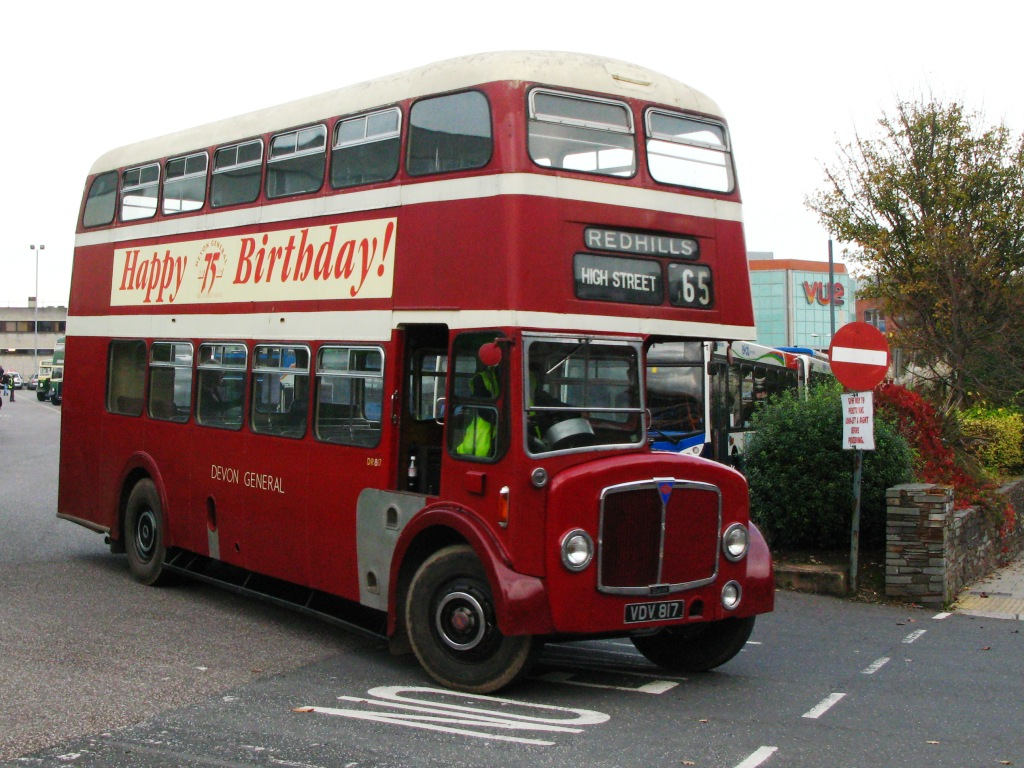
Before 1972

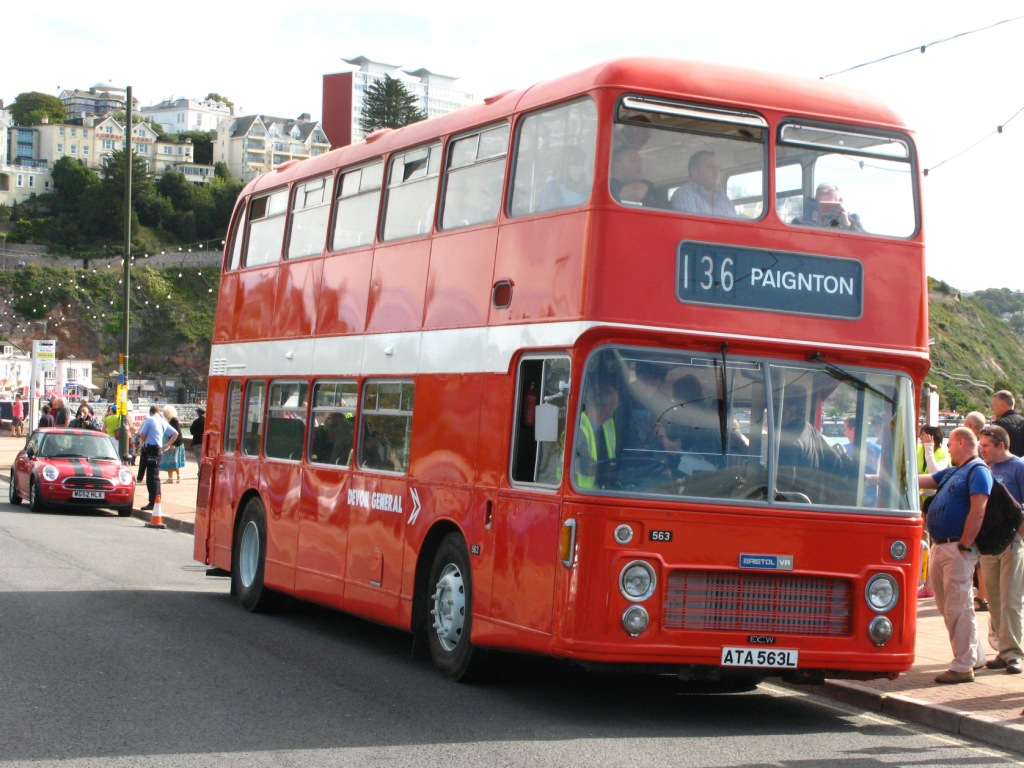
From 1972

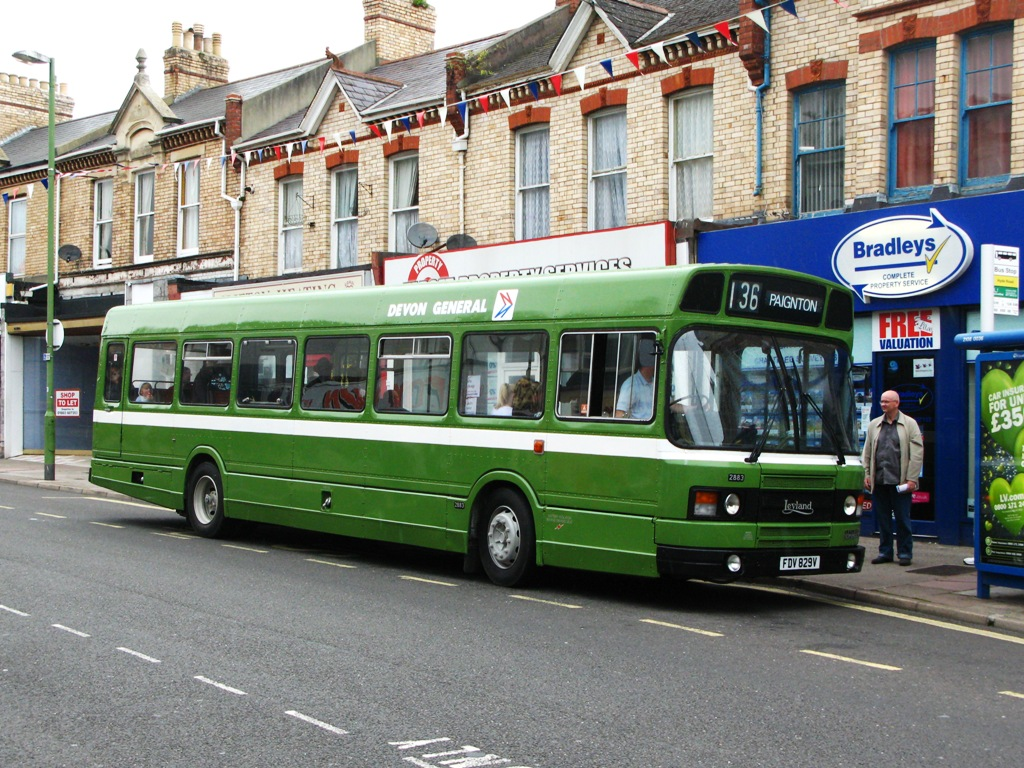
From 1979

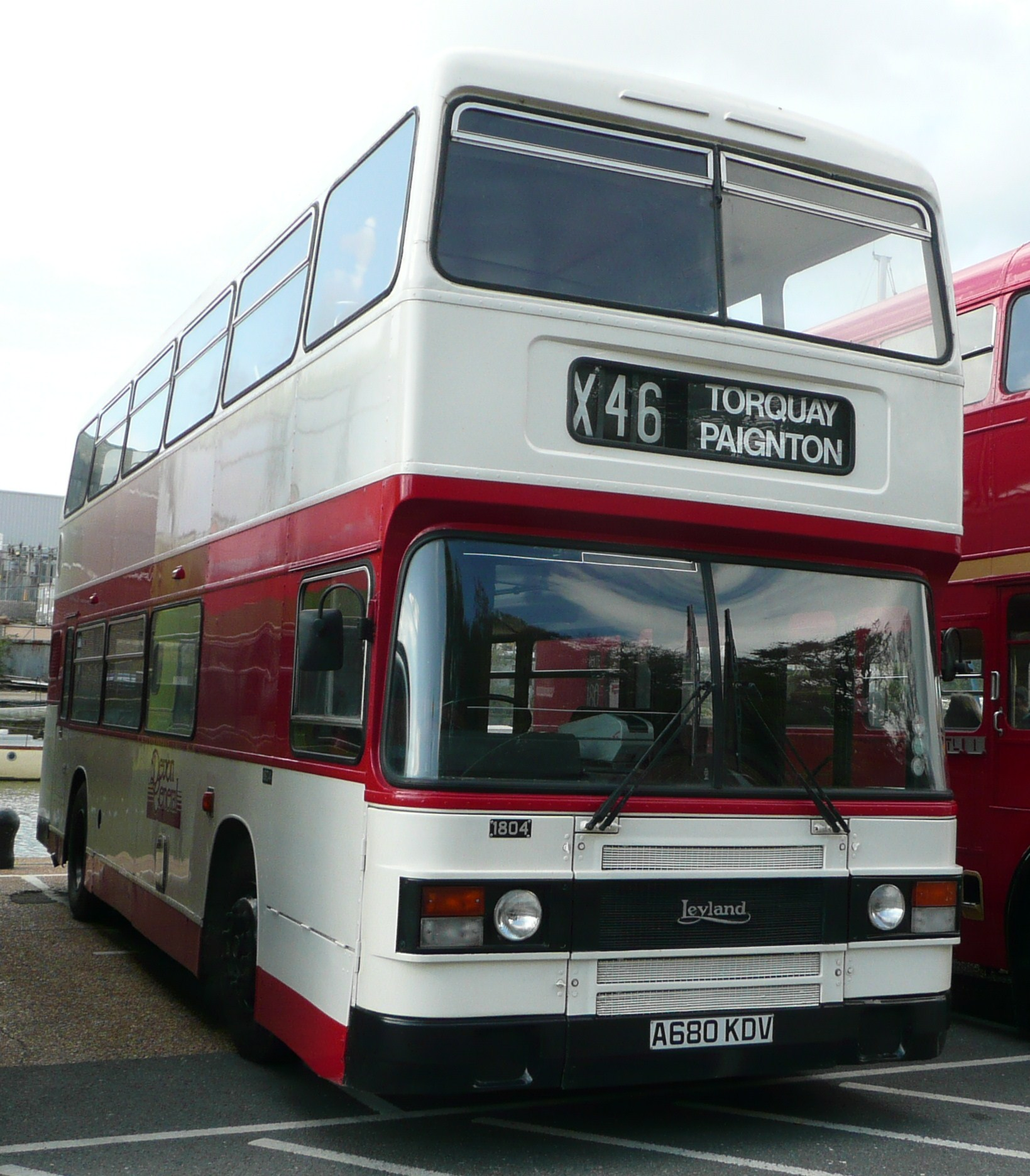
From 1986

== Amalgamated companies ==
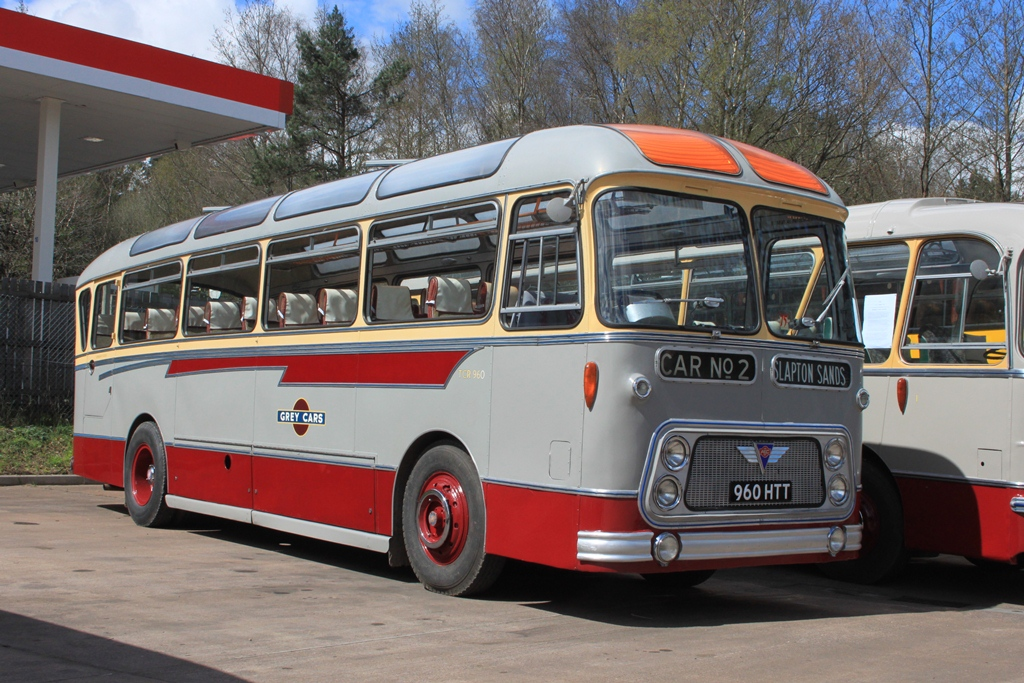
A Grey Cars coach as operated by Devon General in the 1960s

Over the years many rival operators were purchased and their fleets and/or routes were amalgamated into Devon General.

Year	Operator(s)	Location	Vehicles
1922	Torquay Tramways	Torquay	36
1924	Croscols Limited	Tiverton	6
1925	Fleet Cars		5
1925	Comfy Cars	Paignton	4
1926	Whitton	Cullompton	1
1927	Torquay–Chelston Car Company	Torquay	2
1927	Blue Saloon	Ashburton	11
1928	White Heather	Paignton	2
1929	Great Western Railway	Torquay to Paignton route	2
1933	Grey Cars	Torquay	42
1936	Teignmouth Motor Car Company	Teignmouth	3
1936	H.J. Lee	Ottery St Mary	0
1937	G. & W. Harris	Ipplepen	0
1940	W.J. Abbott	Exmouth	0
1948	Witheridge Transport (Greenslade Brothers)	Witheridge	1
1952	W.A. Hart	Budleigh Salterton	5
1952	Balls Bus Service	Newton Abbot	1
1954	A.E. Townsend	Torquay	8
1954	Balls Tours	Newton Abbot	5
1955	H.D. Gourd and Son	Bishopsteignton	1
1957	Falkland Coaches	Torquay	4
1966	Court Garages	Torquay	5
1970	Exeter City Transport	Exeter	65

=== Torquay–Chelston Car Company ===
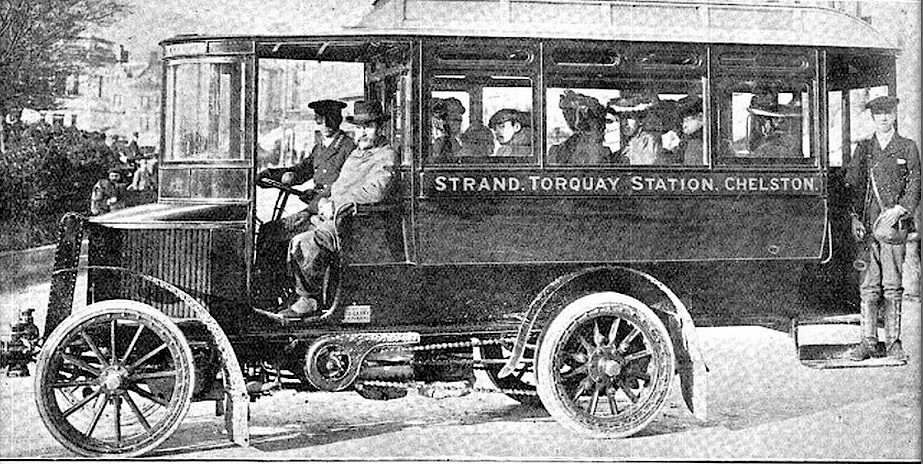
Chelmsford steam omnibus built by Clarkson Ltd, Chelmsford

The Torquay–Chelston Car Company, which Devon General bought in 1927, had its origins in 1903, when a Chelmsford steam bus was demonstrated in Torquay in May 1903. Torquay & District Motor Omnibus Co Ltd, formed on 23 July 1903, ran a Strand - Chelston route from 2 November 1903 via Torbay Road and Rathmore Road terminating at Normanhurst, just short of Rosery Road railway bridge. The bus was green with orange lines and the domed roof was white. It carried 12 inside and 2 beside the driver and 2,828 passengers in the first week. 8 steam buses were working by Easter 1905 between St Marychurch and Babbacombe, but sold after trams started on 4 April 1907. Torquay Road Car took over the old bus garage and ran until liquidation on 24 December 1908.

On 28 March 1911 Torquay-Chelston Steam Car Company Ltd started with 3 Chelmsford buses, possibly those stored after the liquidation. They dropped the 'Steam' part of the name when a single deck RAF type Leyland took over, after Devon General started a competing Meadfoot Beach - Chelston route on 31 March 1923. The Chelston company bought a new Leyland PLSC Lion in 1925. In 1926, Devon General started to shadow the Chelston bus. The company sold out to Devon General in 1927, the Leylands becoming 98 and 99 in their fleet. The Devon General timetables were revised in July, 1929, with numbering similar to current services, including 32 (Torquay - Paignton via Preston), 33 (Strand-Chelston circular) and 35 (Shiphay Turn - Meadfoot Beach).

On the Chelston routes Devon General used Leyland Lions, Dennis Lancet lIs from 1938, AEC Regals from 1939, Leyland Royal Tigers in 1954, AEC Reliances in 1957, Regent IIIs in 1960 and Leyland Atlanteans from 1964.

== See also ==
- Open top buses in Torbay
