= Royal Blue Coach Services =

British bus operating company

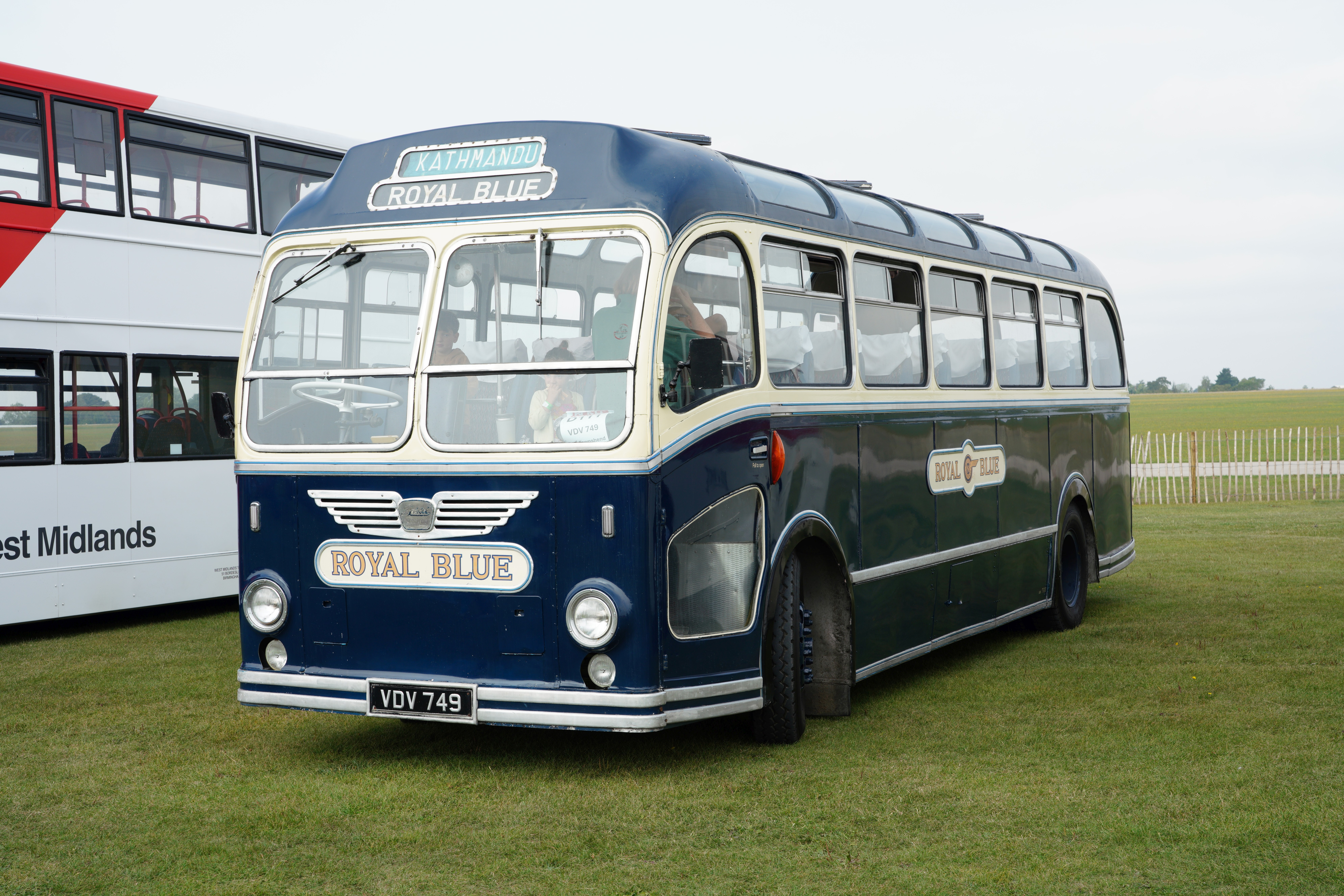
- Preserved Bristol at Sywell Aerodrome
- Parent: National Bus Company
- Founded: 1880
- Ceased operation: 1986
- Service area: England
- Service type: Coach operator

Royal Blue Express Services was a coach operator in the south and west of England from 1880 until 1986.

== History ==
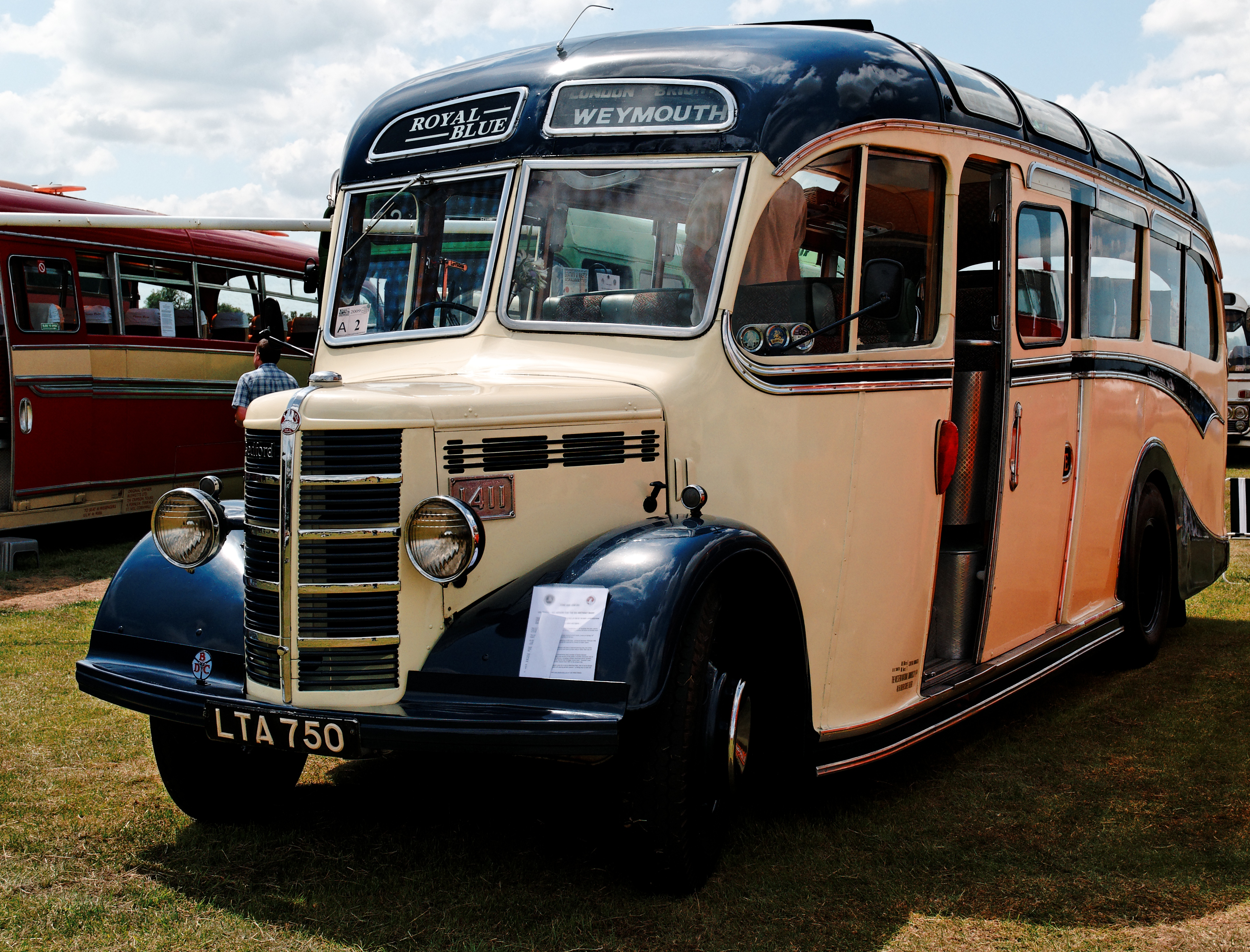
Preserved Duple bodied Bedford OB in June 2009

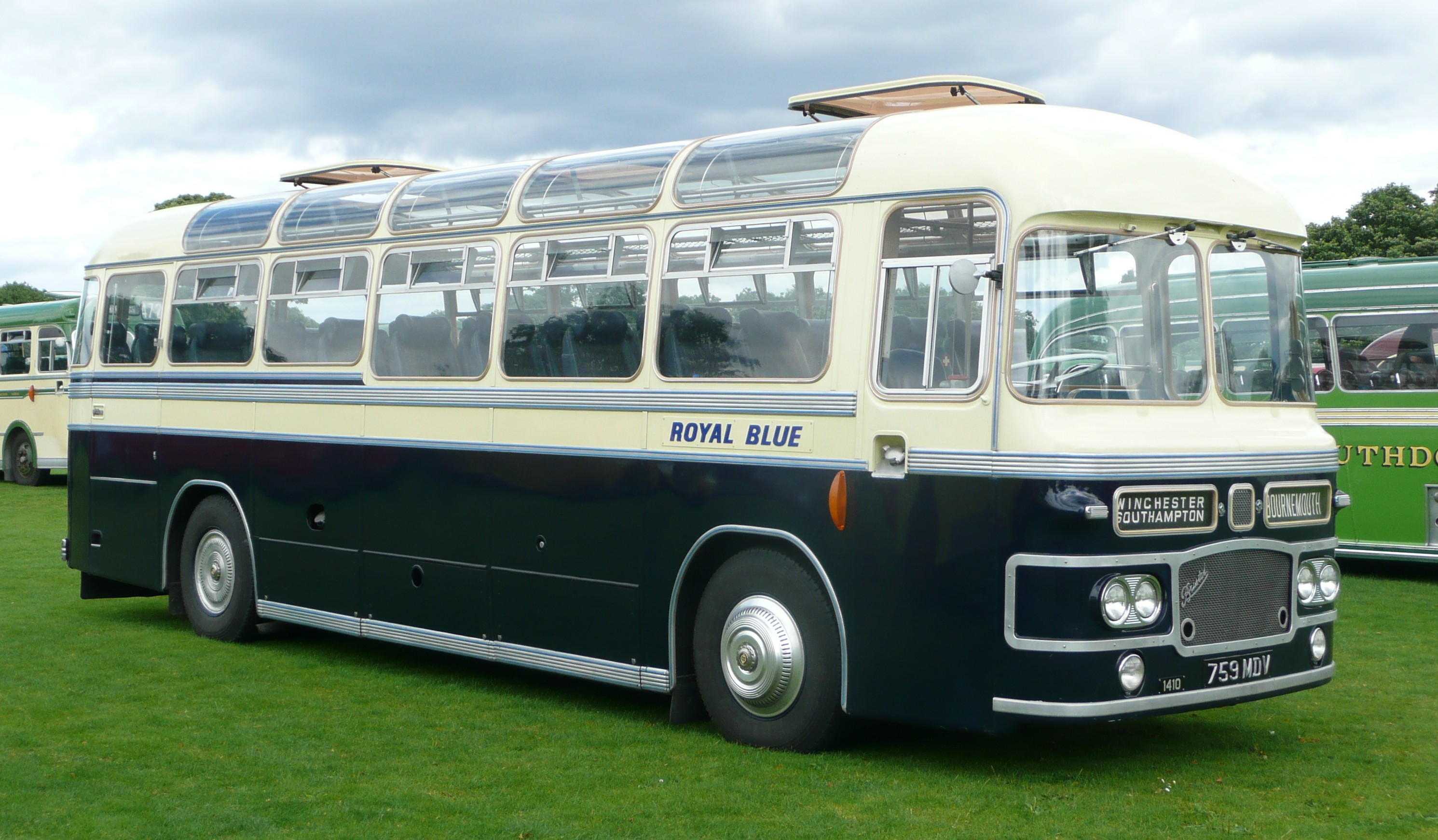
Preserved Bristol in July 2008

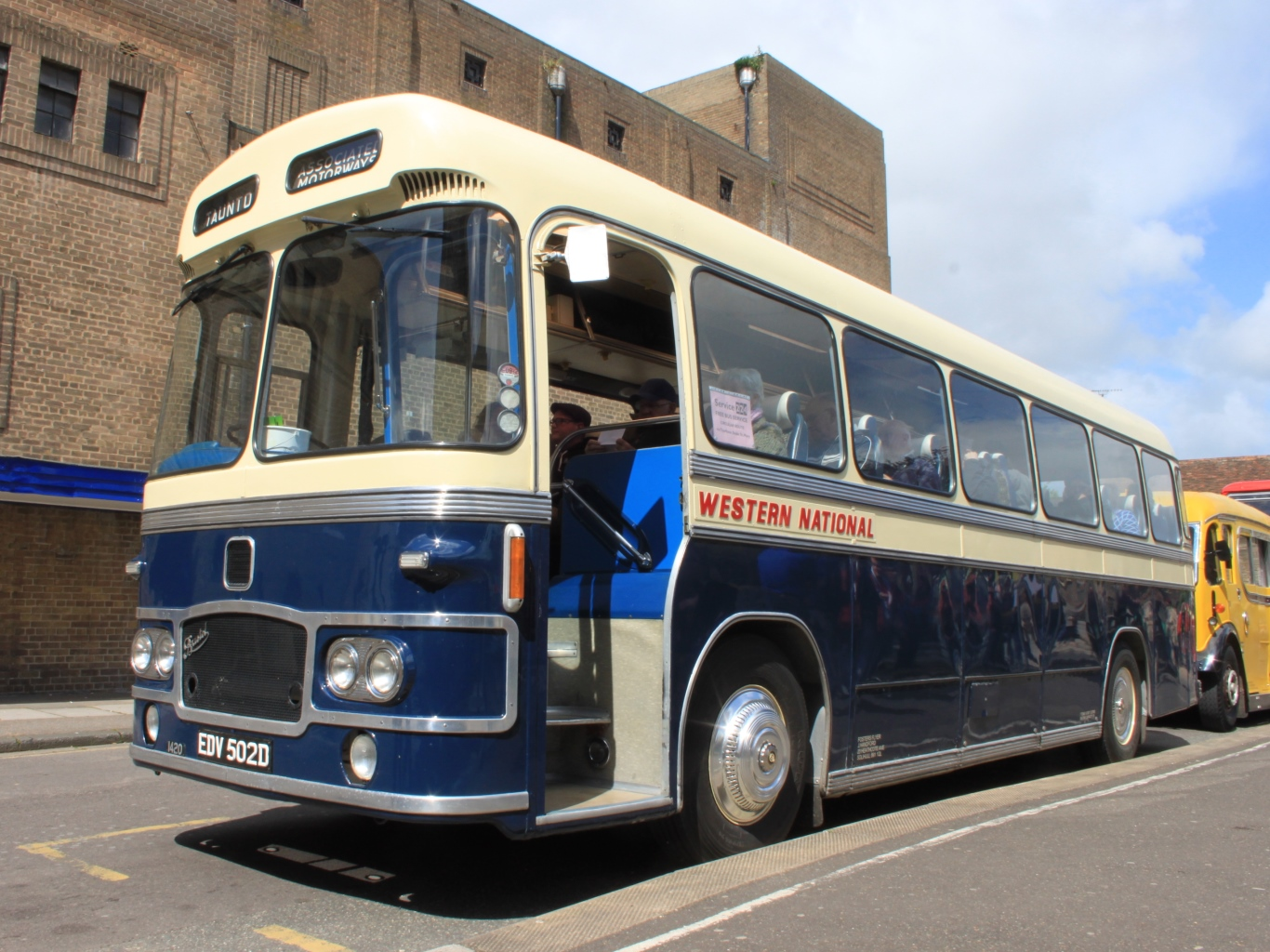
Preserved Bristol MW in May 2014

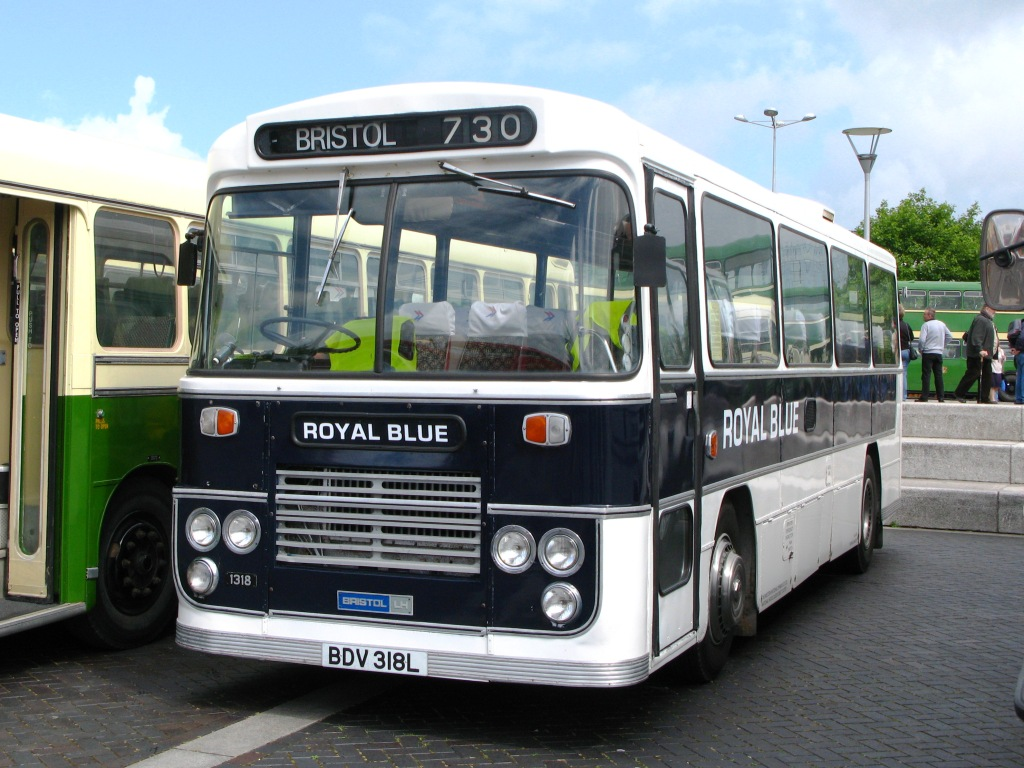
Preserved Marshall bodied Bristol LH6L in May 2011

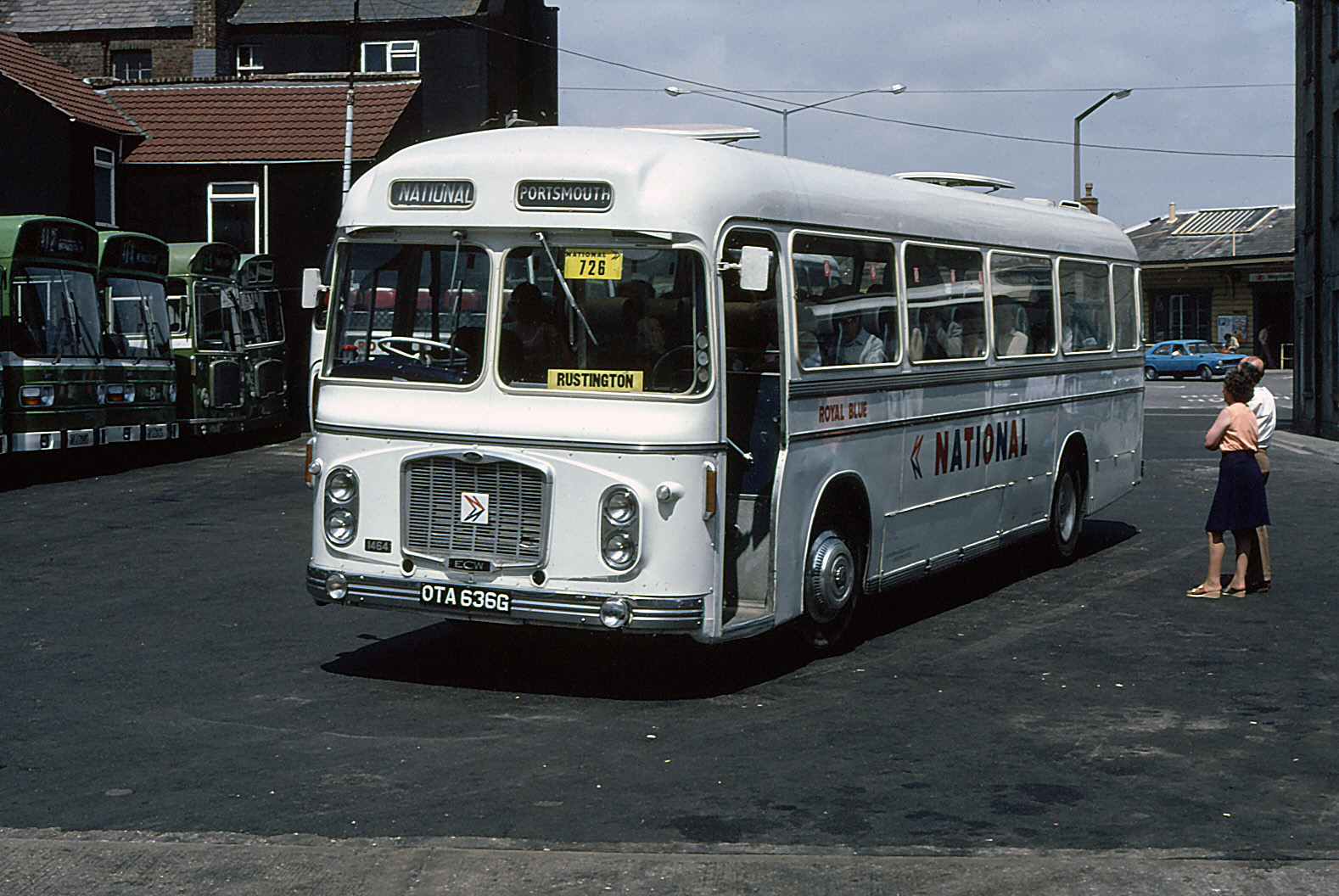
Eastern Coach Works bodied Bristol in Weymouth in 1978 in National Express livery

=== Origins ===
The Royal Blue business was founded in 1880 by Thomas Elliott in Bournemouth. The business, at first known as Royal Blue & Branksome Mews, included the hire of every kind of horse-drawn vehicle, as well as coach building, saddlery and blacksmithing. Elliott soon started a four-in-hand stagecoach service to connect Bournemouth to the railway at Holmsley. That service became redundant when the railway was extended to Bournemouth in 1888, but by then Elliott had started running Royal Blue excursions by charabanc and coach around Bournemouth and the New Forest. When Thomas died in 1911, the business was taken over by his sons John and William.

=== Early motor coach services ===
In 1913, Royal Blue purchased its first motor charabanc, and motors rapidly replaced the horses. In 1919, the Elliott Brothers took advantage of a railway strike to start a motor coach service from Bournemouth to London. The service was so successful that the service was increased to twice a week during 1920, and twice daily during 1921. By 1926, Royal Blue was operating 72 coaches.

Until 1928, the express coach service only carried passengers to and from Bournemouth and London, not intermediate points. In 1928, Royal Blue obtained licences to pick up and set down en route, and started services from Bournemouth and London to many more cities, including Birmingham, Bristol and Plymouth. By 1930, Royal Blue was operating 11 routes, an expansion prompted by the expected passage of the Road Traffic Act 1930, which was to regulate competition for passenger road transport.

The Road Traffic Act led coach operators to eliminate competition in two ways: by buying competitors and by reaching agreements with competitors to share services and pool revenues. Royal Blue did both. It acquired competitors in Plymouth (Traveller Coaches) and Portsmouth (Olympic Services), and made co-ordination agreements with Southdown and East Kent (between Margate and Bournemouth), Greyhound Motors (between London and Bristol), Western National (between London and Plymouth) and Southern National (between London and Paignton). In 1934, Royal Blue was one of the founders of Associated Motorways, which co-ordinated coach routes of six operators.

At the end of 1934, Elliot Brothers sold the Royal Blue business to Western National and Southern National, by then controlled by the Tilling Group. The new owners continued the process of acquiring competitors and expanding the route network, particularly in Devon and Cornwall. The change of control also meant that Royal Blue switched to Bristol for its new coaches, the Tilling Group also controlling the Bristol bus factory.

World War II brought black-out night driving, fuel shortages and bomb damage to Royal Blue garages. Royal Blue was forced to cease operations from October 1942 to Easter 1946.

=== Nationalisation ===
In 1947, the Tilling Group sold its bus operations (including Western National and Southern National) to the British Transport Commission, so that Royal Blue became government owned. State control did little to hinder the expansion of Royal Blue services. Fuel shortages meant that in the early post-war years even those who owned cars hesitated to use them for long journeys, and few people went on holiday abroad, so there was a strong demand for long-distance coach travel. The Beeching cuts of the early 1960s generated more traffic for Royal Blue, and traffic peaked in 1965, with well over 1.5 million passenger journeys.

On 1 January 1963, Royal Blue's owners, Western National and Southern National were included in the British Transport Commission's transport assets passing to the state-owned Transport Holding Company, which in turn passed to the state-owned National Bus Company on 1 January 1969.

In 1972, the National Bus Company formed National Travel, which became National Express, to run long-distance coach services. The following year the operations of Royal Blue were franchised to National Express. Western National continued to own the Royal Blue coaches, but was required to adopt the National Express brand white livery, somewhat inappropriate for Royal Blue. The Royal Blue name was retained.

Unlike many local bus services, Royal Blue's coach services continued to make profits. The spread of the UK's motorway network in the 1970s cut journey times dramatically, and coach travel had a significant cost advantage over rail travel.

=== Privatisation ===
Under the Transport Act 1980, express coach services were deregulated. In January 1983, Western National was divided into four companies and these were privatised between 1986 and 1988. In 1986, to strengthen the national brand, National Express dropped all regional names, and so the Royal Blue name came to an end after 106 years.

In 1988, National Express was sold to its management, and in December 1992 it was floated on the London Stock Exchange.

== Reuse of name ==
The Royal Blue brand has been resurrected, but the reincarnation is related to the original Royal Blue in name only.

In March 2012, Royal Blue Motorcoach was launched in the Bournemouth area, where Elliott Bros began their first Royal Blue services, as a trading name of Self Heritage International Tours Limited.
