= Western National =

Bus Company

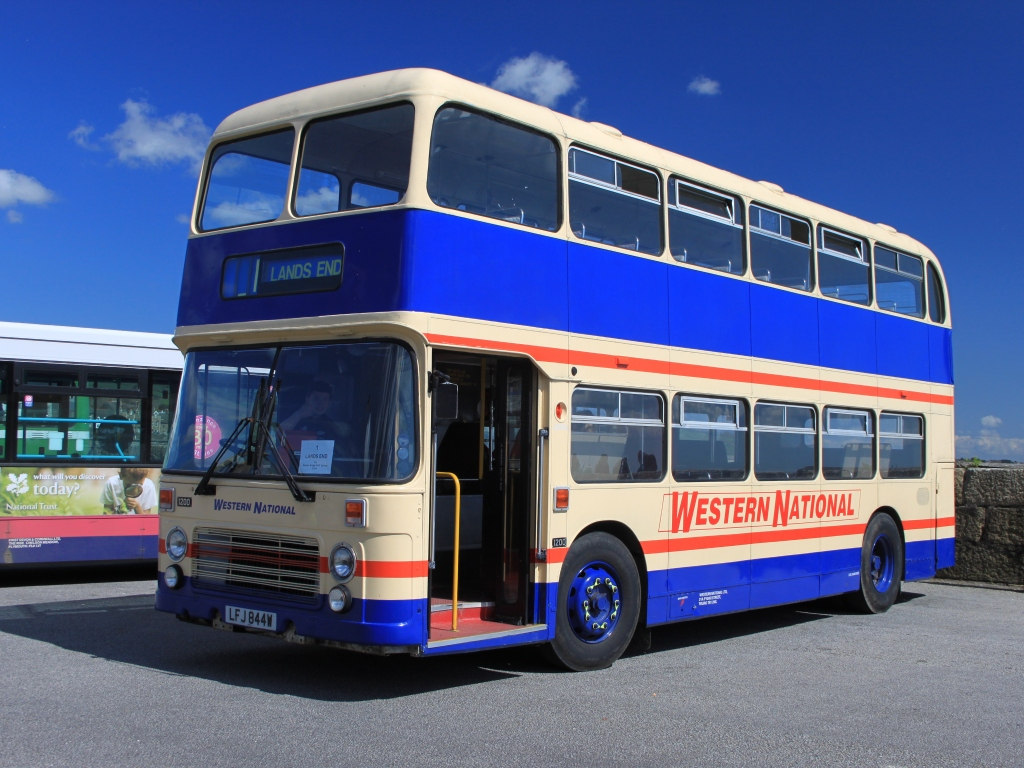
- Preserved Bristol VRT in Penzance in April 2012
- Parent: National Bus Company
- Founded: 1929
- Ceased operation: 1997
- Headquarters: Exeter
- Service area: Cornwall; Devon; Dorset; Gloucestershire; Somerset
- Service type: Bus operator
- Hubs: Plymouth, North Cornwall, West Cornwall
- Depots: Plymouth, Camborne, Penzance

Western National (originally the Western National Omnibus Company) was a bus company operating in South West England from 1929 until the 1990s.

== Early history ==
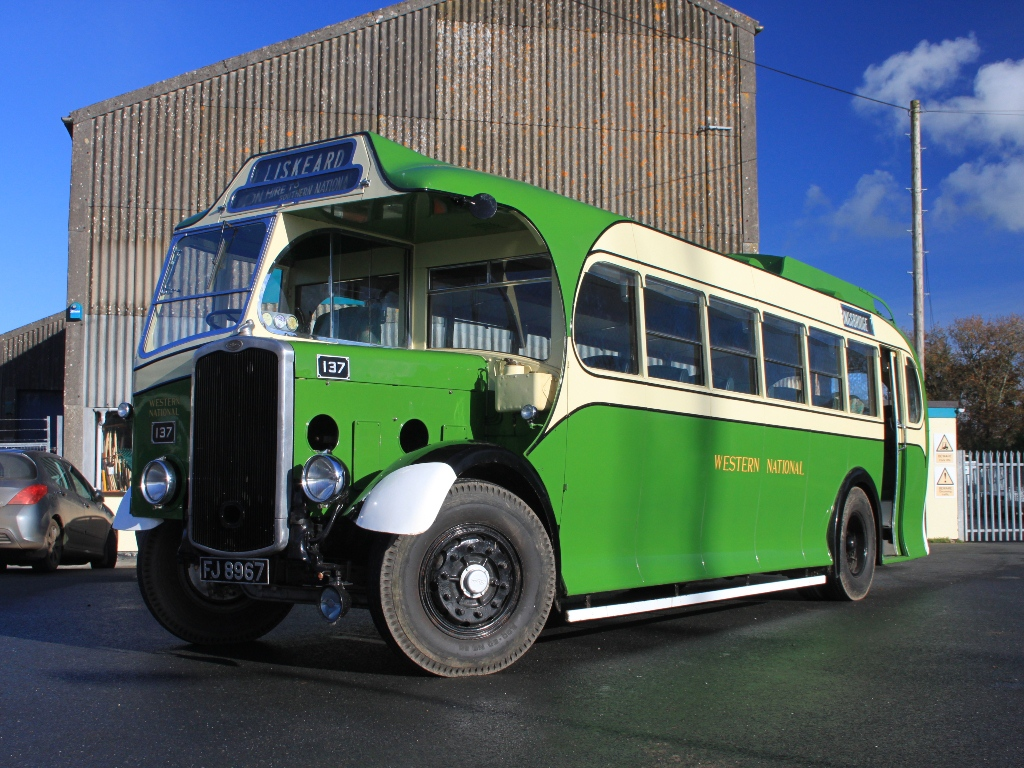
Preserved Bristol H in 2012

The Western National Omnibus Company was founded in 1929 as a joint venture between the Great Western Railway (GWR) and the National Omnibus & Transport Company. The National company had originated in 1909 as the National Steam Car Company, started to run steam bus services in London. The London services ceased in 1919, when the company was renamed National Omnibus & Transport Company. The company expanded outside London, into Essex (1913), Bedfordshire (1919), Gloucestershire (1919), Somerset (1920), Dorset (1921), and Devon and Cornwall (1927).

The GWR had developed an extensive network of bus services in Devon and Cornwall. These services, and those of the National Omnibus in Devon and Cornwall, were transferred to Western National. A few months later, the new company bought the operations of the National company in south west Somerset, Wiltshire and Gloucestershire, and also the GWR bus services around Trowbridge and Stroud. The result was an operating territory stretching from Cheltenham to Penzance, in five areas: Gloucestershire (based in Stroud), Wiltshire (based in Trowbridge), south and west Somerset (based in Taunton), south Devon (based in Plymouth) and Cornwall. Western National's operating territory was interspersed with those of three other major operators: Bristol in south Gloucestershire and north Somerset, Southern National in north Devon and north Cornwall and Devon General in south and east Devon.

In 1931, a controlling interest in the National Omnibus was acquired by the Tilling Group. From then on Western National was run as a Tilling company, although the GWR retained its shares until 1948. Western National and Southern National shared a common management, based in Exeter (although curiously neither company had a depot in Exeter).

At the end of 1934, Western National and Southern National bought Royal Blue Coach Services.

== Nationalisation ==

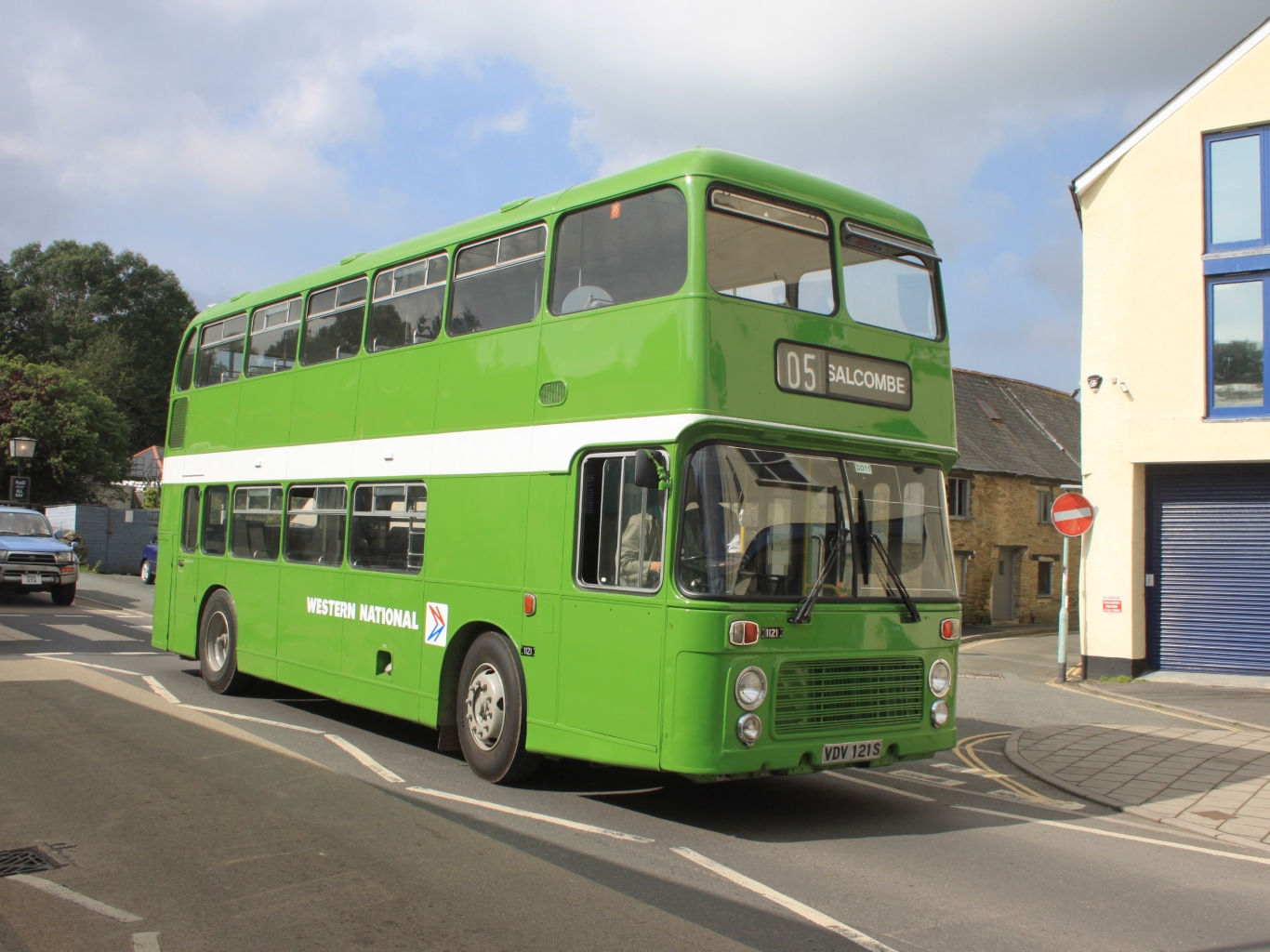
Preserved Eastern Coach Works bodied Bristol VR with NBC livery in 2015

On 1 January 1948, the Great Western Railway was nationalised and, shortly after, the Tilling Group sold its bus interests to the government. Western National therefore became a state-owned company, under the control of the British Transport Commission.

The new regime resulted in some rationalisation of the company's area of operations. In 1950, the Gloucestershire area operations were transferred to Bristol Tramways.

On 1 January 1963, Western National was included in the transfer of the British Transport Commission's transport assets to the state-owned Transport Holding Company which, in turn, passed to the state-owned National Bus Company (NBC) on 1 January 1969.

The NBC embarked on more rationalisation of Western National's operations. In 1969, the operations of Southern National were merged with those of Western National, so that Western National acquired the operating areas of north Cornwall, north Devon and Dorset. In 1970 the Wiltshire area operations of Western National were transferred to Bristol Omnibus Company. Then, in 1971, the NBC transferred the operations of Devon General to Western National, although Devon General was retained as a brand. Western National pulled out of north Cornwall in 1971, leaving the area to local operators. Then, in 1974, the former Southern National operations in the Swanage area of east Dorset were transferred to Hants & Dorset.

== Privatisation ==
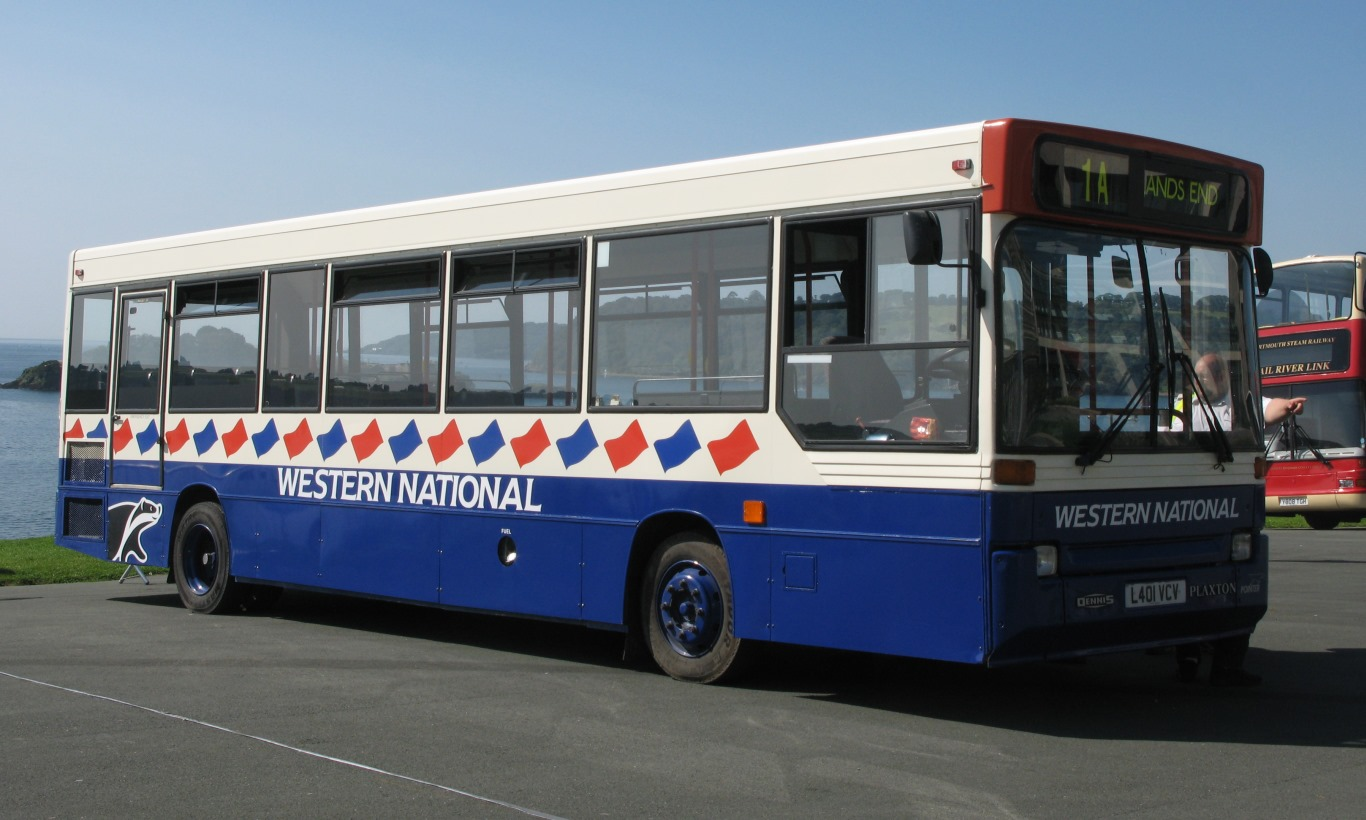
Preserved Plaxton Pointer bodied Dennis Dart with Badgerline-era livery in 2017

In the lead up to deregulation, in January 1983 Western National was divided into four companies:

- Devon General Limited in the old Devon General area in south and east Devon
- North Devon Limited trading as Red Bus in North Devon
- Southern National Limited in Somerset and Dorset
- Western National Limited in Cornwall and Plymouth

On 19 August 1986, Devon General became the first National Bus Company subsidiary to be privatised under the Transport Act 1985 being sold in a management buyout led by managing director Harry Blundred. In 1996 it was sold to Stagecoach and in 2003 rebranded Stagecoach Devon.

On 7 August 1987 Western National, was sold to Plympton Coachlines with Badgerline having an initial 39% shareholding, which was increased to 66% in August 1988. Western National was included in the June 1995 merger of Badgerline with GRT Group to form FirstBus.

North Devon and Southern National were jointly sold to their management on 29 March 1988. On 4 April 1999, both were sold to FirstGroup. First split Southern National into two, the Dorset operations became part of First Hampshire & Dorset, and the Somerset operations part of First Somerset & Avon. The North Devon operations were combined with those of First Western National to form First Devon & Cornwall.

== See also ==
- Taunton bus station
