= Southern National =

British bus operating company

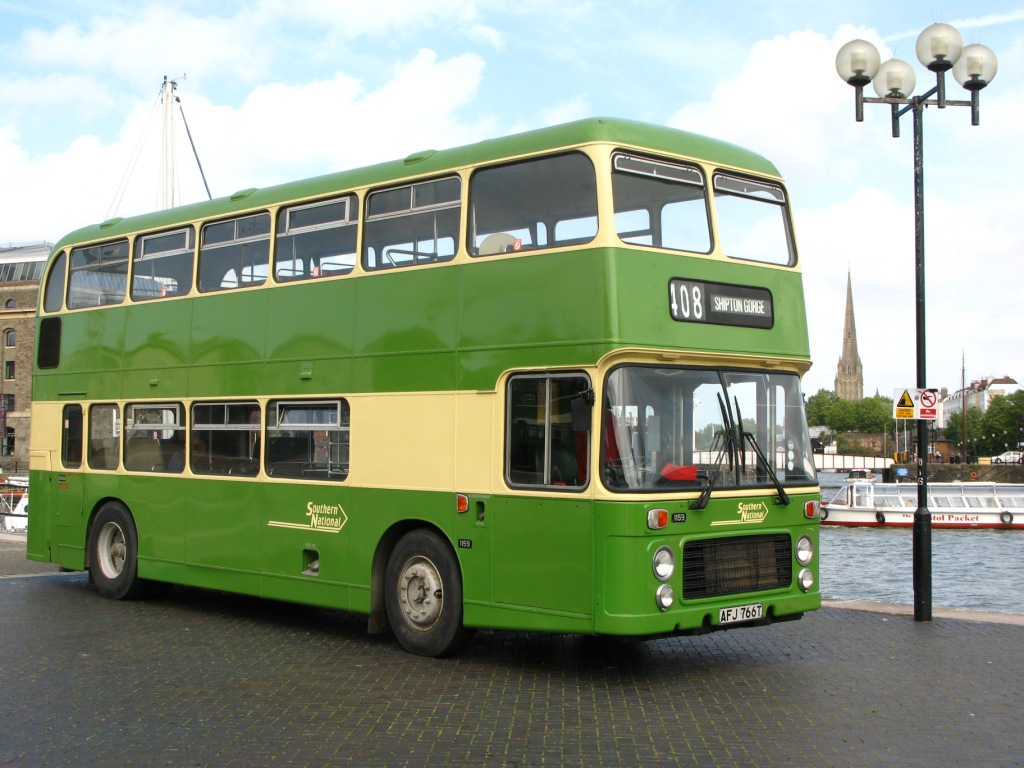
- Preserved Bristol VRT in Bristol in May 2011
- Founded: 1929
- Ceased operation: 1999
- Headquarters: Exeter
- Service area: South West England
- Service type: Bus operator

Southern National was a bus company operating in South West England from 1929 until 1969, and again from 1983 until 1999.

== History ==
=== Original company (1929–1969) ===
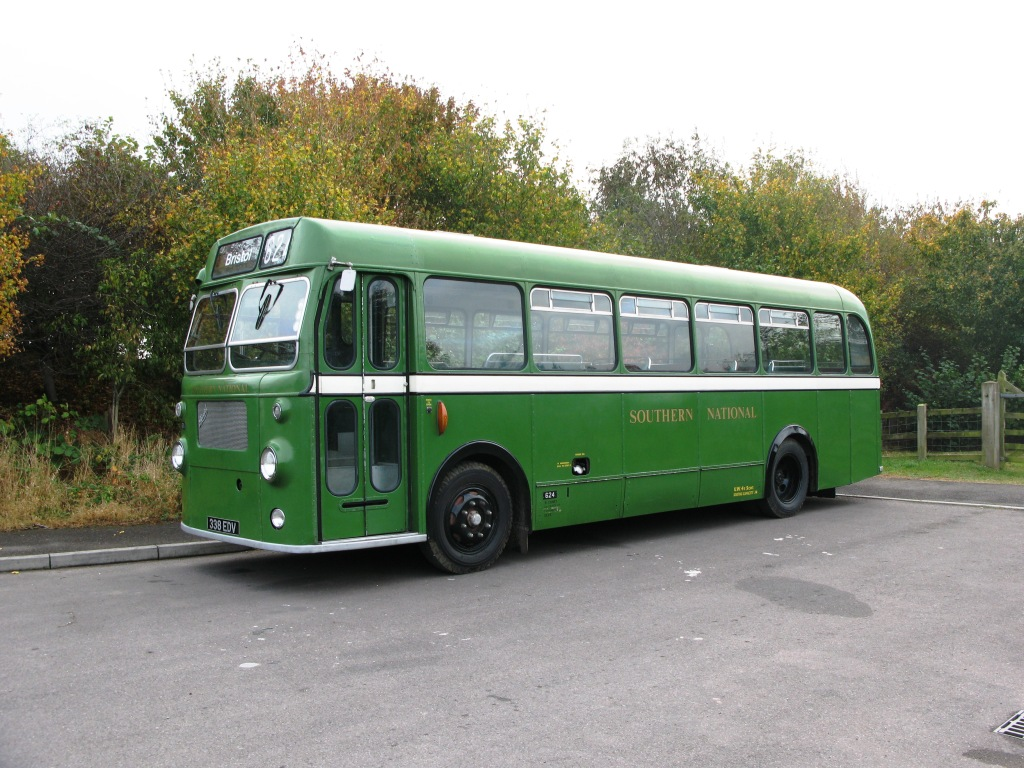
Preserved Bristol SUL4A in October 2009

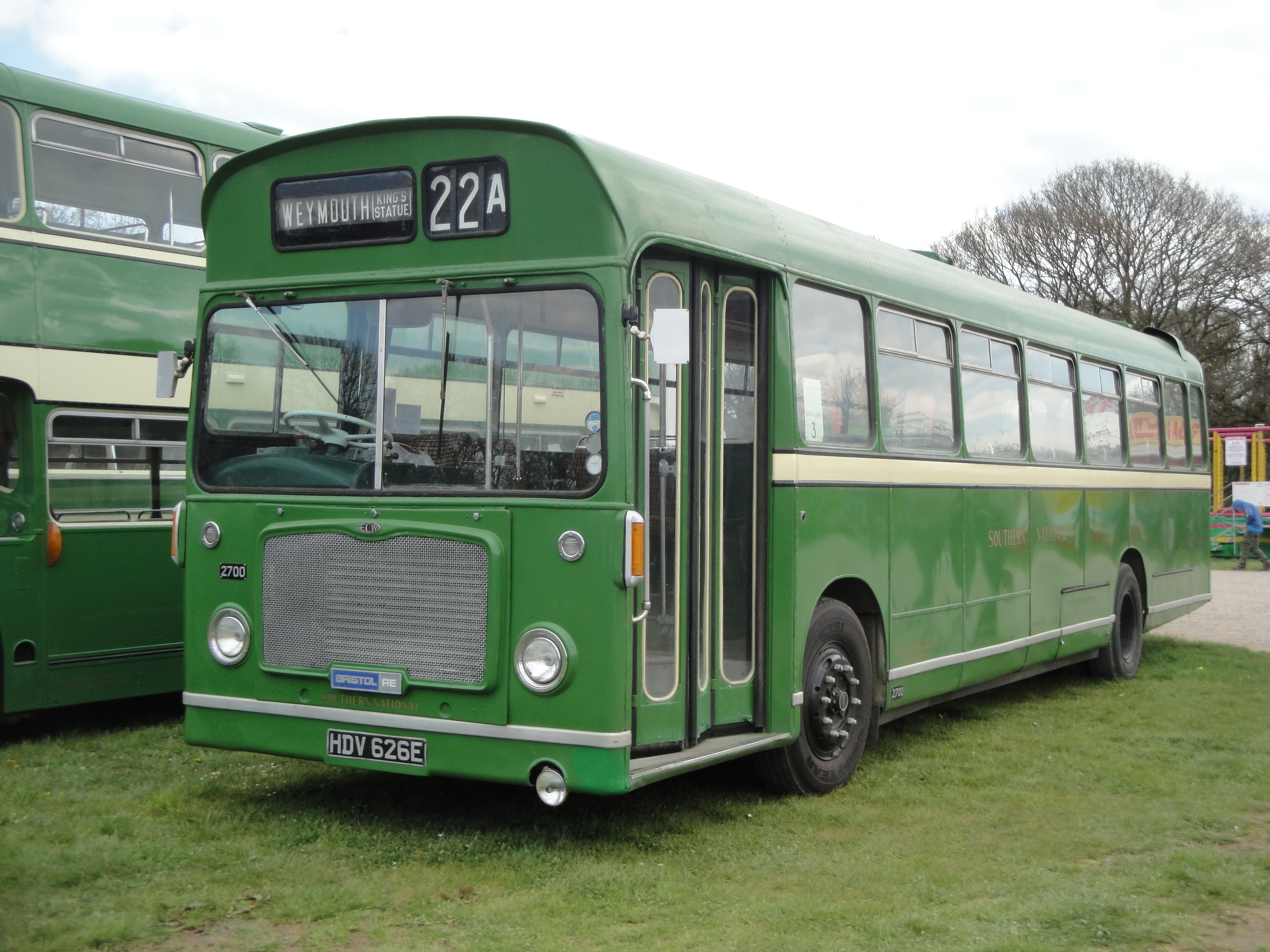
Preserved Bristol RE in April 2012

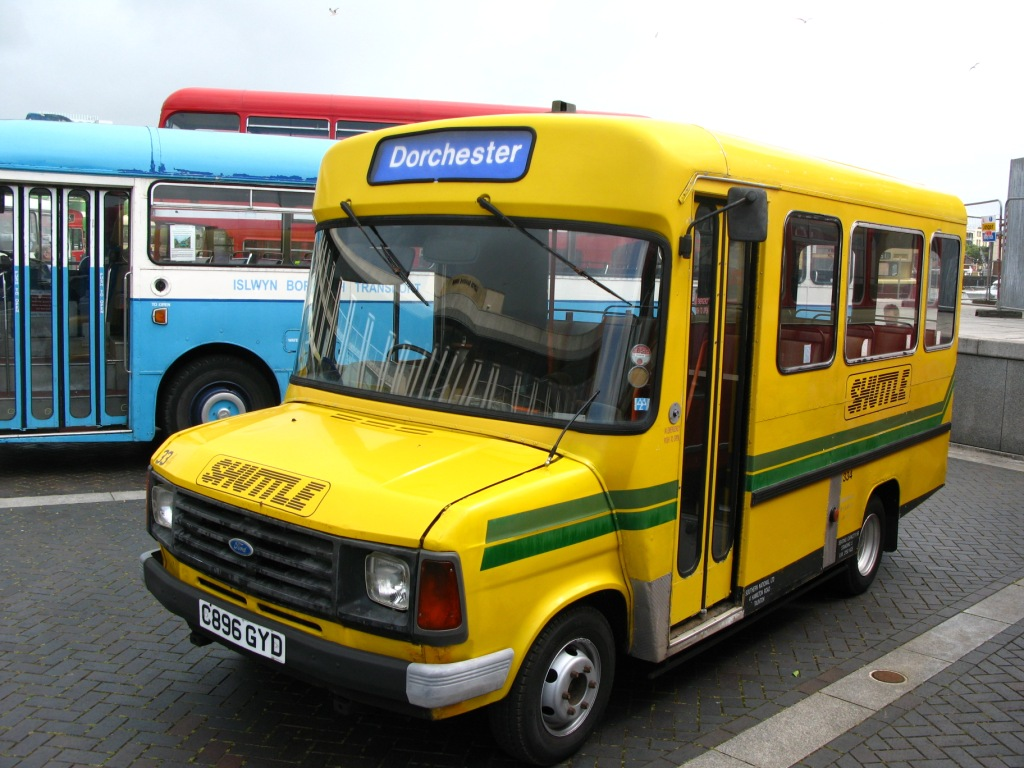
Preserved former Southern National Ford Transit minibus in Bristol in May 2011

Southern National Omnibus Company started in 1929 as a joint venture between the Southern Railway and the National Omnibus & Transport Company. The National company had originated in 1909 as the National Steam Car Company, started to run steam bus services in London. The London services ceased in 1919, when the company was renamed National Omnibus & Transport Company. The company expanded outside London, into Essex (1913), Bedfordshire (1919), Gloucestershire (1919), Somerset (1920), Dorset (1921), and Devon & Cornwall (1927).

Southern National was formed to improve co-ordination of road and rail passenger services in the operating area of the Southern Railway. The railway had very little involvement in bus services, but the National Omnibus transferred its operations in the operating area to the new company. The result was an operating territory split into two areas: Dorset (based at Weymouth) and north Devon and north Cornwall (based at Barnstaple). The two areas were separated by the operating territories of Devon General and Western National.

In 1931 a controlling interest in the National Omnibus was acquired by the Tilling Group. From then on Southern National was run as a Tilling company, although the railway retained its shares until 1948. Western National and Southern National shared a common management, based in Exeter. At the end of 1934, Western National and Southern National bought Royal Blue Coach Services.

On 1 January 1948, the Southern Railway was nationalised, and shortly after, the Tilling Group sold its bus interests to the government. Southern National therefore became a state-owned company, under the control of the British Transport Commission. On 1 January 1963, Southern National was included in the transfer of the British Transport Commission's transport assets to the state-owned Transport Holding Company, which in turn passed to the state-owned National Bus Company (NBC) on 1 January 1969.

One year after its formation, the NBC rationalised its operations, transferring those of Southern National to Western National, and Southern National ceased to operate as a separate entity.

=== Revival (1983–1999) ===
In preparation for privatisation Western National was divided into four companies in January 1983. One of these was Southern National. The territory of the new Southern National was the old Southern National Dorset area together with the south and west Somerset area, which had not previously been Southern National territory.

On 29 March 1988, Southern National was sold in a management buyout. On 4 April 1999, it was sold to FirstGroup. First split Southern National into two, the Dorset operations became part of First Hampshire & Dorset, and the Somerset operations part of First Somerset & Avon.

=== The Buses of Somerset ===
In 2014, First's operations in Taunton and Bridgwater was rebranded under the new name of The Buses of Somerset. Whilst the name and brand were entirely new, the livery is reminiscent of Southern National utilising two tones of green and cream. It is the first major departure from the FirstGroup corporate identity and livery for the bus group.

=== 2015 revival ===
The Southern National brand was revived in 2015 by Somerset transport firm, JJP Holdings SW Limited who already operated buses under the revived Crosville Motor Services brand. It was granted an operator's licence in 2015. In celebration of the news, one of the original Southern National buses has been restored by JJP Holdings, bringing it back to its former glory.

== Legal Entity ==
The original legal entity, Southern National Omnibus Company Limited that was incorporated in 1929, was recycled by the National Bus Company in 1986, renamed Northumbria Motor Services Limited and used as one of the companies into which United Automobile Services was divided in preparation for privatisation. It is now Arriva Northumbria Limited.

== See also ==
- Taunton bus station
