= Tilling Group =

British bus operator and industrial conglomerate

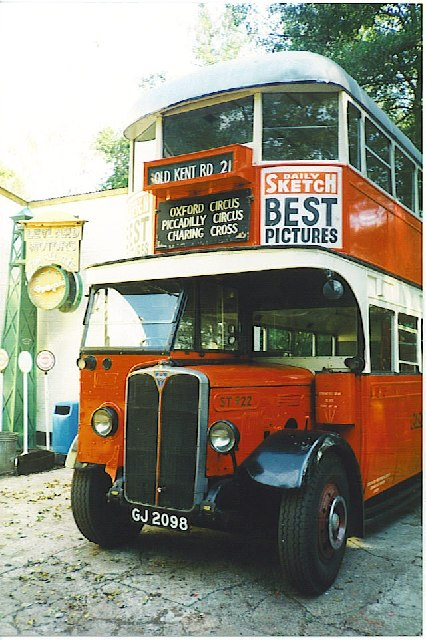
- Tilling Group bus at Cobham Bus Museum, 1997.
- Founded: 1846
- Headquarters: London
- Service type: Rural and urban bus services

The Tilling Group was one of two conglomerates that controlled almost all of the major bus operators in the United Kingdom between World Wars I and II and until nationalisation in 1948.

Tilling, together with the other conglomerate, British Electric Traction (BET), became the main constituents of the country's nationalised bus industry in the late 1960s and was sufficiently well known to have entered popular culture as part of London's Cockney rhyming slang (Thomas Tilling = shilling).

The company continued as an industrial conglomerate after the nationalisation of its bus interests; it was acquired by BTR plc in 1983.

== Origins ==
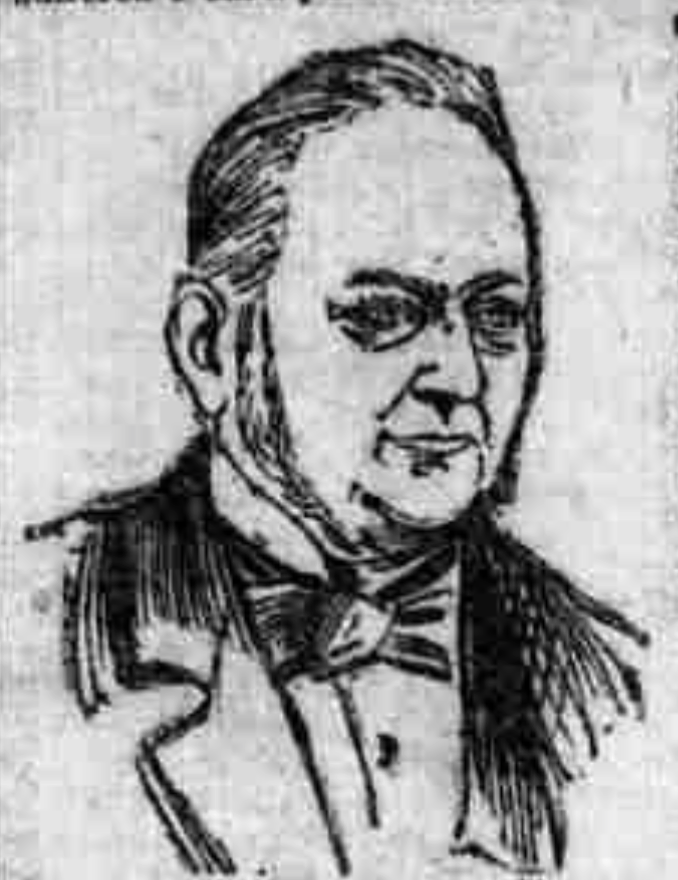
Ink sketch of Thomas Tilling, from an 1893 South London Press article.

The company traces its origins to 1846, when Thomas Tilling started in business. Tilling was born in 1825 at Gutter's Hedge Farm, Hendon, Middlesex, of parents who had moved there from Gloucestershire. In 1846, at the age of 21, he went into the transport business in London as a jobmaster in Walworth using a horse and carriage which cost him £30.

In January 1850, he purchased a horse-drawn omnibus together with the right to run four journeys a day between Peckham and Oxford Street. This bus he drove himself, and at the time had only one employee, a conductor named Joseph Eagle, who stayed with the firm until the end of his working life, well into the 1890s.

By 1856, Tilling owned 70 horses, which he used for bus and general carriage work. When the Metropolitan Fire Brigade was formed in 1866, Tilling was contracted to train and supply horses to haul the fire engines; the horses were trained to respond quickly and, prior to handover to the fire brigade, were employed on bus services (primarily the Peckham route) to gain experience with heavy traffic. Tilling soon became the biggest supplier of horsepower and vehicles in London, with a stable of 4,000 horses by the time of his death in 1893. Tilling is buried at Nunhead Cemetery, south London.

Tilling's omnibuses stopped at predetermined points and ran to a fixed timetable, making them more punctual and orderly than the other operators' buses. This was one of the reasons for his success with customers. Because his buses operated on time, they earned the nickname of "Times" buses, and this became the fleet name painted on the side.

The actress Mabel Constanduros was one of Thomas Tilling's grandchildren; she was a daughter of his son Richard Stephen Tilling.

== Early history ==
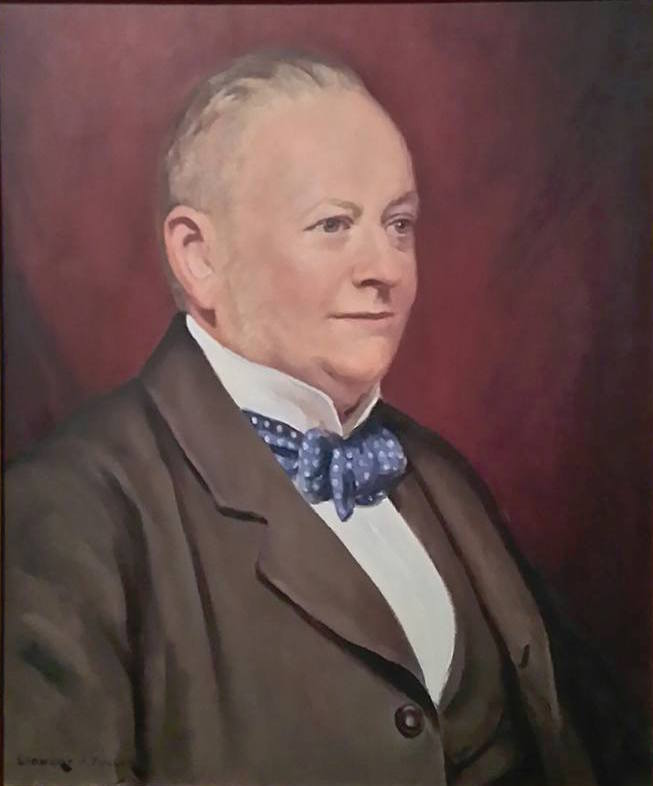
Portrait of Tilling

The business passed to Tilling's sons, Richard and Edward, who, with Thomas's son-in-law Walter Wolsey, formed a limited company, Thomas Tilling Ltd, in 1897. In addition to bus work, the company hired carriages to individuals and to a range of public utilities.

The company put three Milnes-Daimler 24 horsepower (18 kW) motor buses into service in 1904. These were open top double-deckers with 16 inside seats and 18 "outside" on the upper deck, and a speed of 12 mph (19 km/h). These were the first double-decker motorbuses built for public service in London. By 1905, Tilling had 20 motor buses but still owned 7,000 horses, kept in 500 stables. The horses worked the company's 250 omnibuses, and were hired to companies and individuals for hauling goods vehicles, cabs, and carriages. In 1907, Tilling began the first long-distance motor bus service, running 13 buses between Oxford Circus and Sidcup in Kent.

In 1909, Tilling entered into an agreement with the London General Omnibus Company (LGOC), which pooled their resources (and allowed Tilling to remain independent when LGOC led an amalgamation of most of London's bus companies), but which restricted their expansion in the capital. Then, LGOC and Tilling co-operated on a joint route from Peckham to Turnham Green, via Oxford Circus. The LGOC had introduced numbers on all its routes, and this was route number 12. This service between Peckham and Oxford Circus still operates and is still the number 12. It may be the oldest operating bus route in London. In 1915, the first woman bus conductor in London worked on Tilling route number 37. During World War I, women were recruited to replace men who had joined the Armed Forces.

In 1911, Tilling introduced the Tilling-Stevens TTA1 petrol-electric bus into its fleet; despite some drawbacks of the technology, this type formed the mainstay of the fleet for some years. In 1914, just before the outbreak of World War I, the last omnibus operated on the Tilling Honor Oak – Peckham Rye Station route, after which the horses were requisitioned for war work.

== National expansion ==
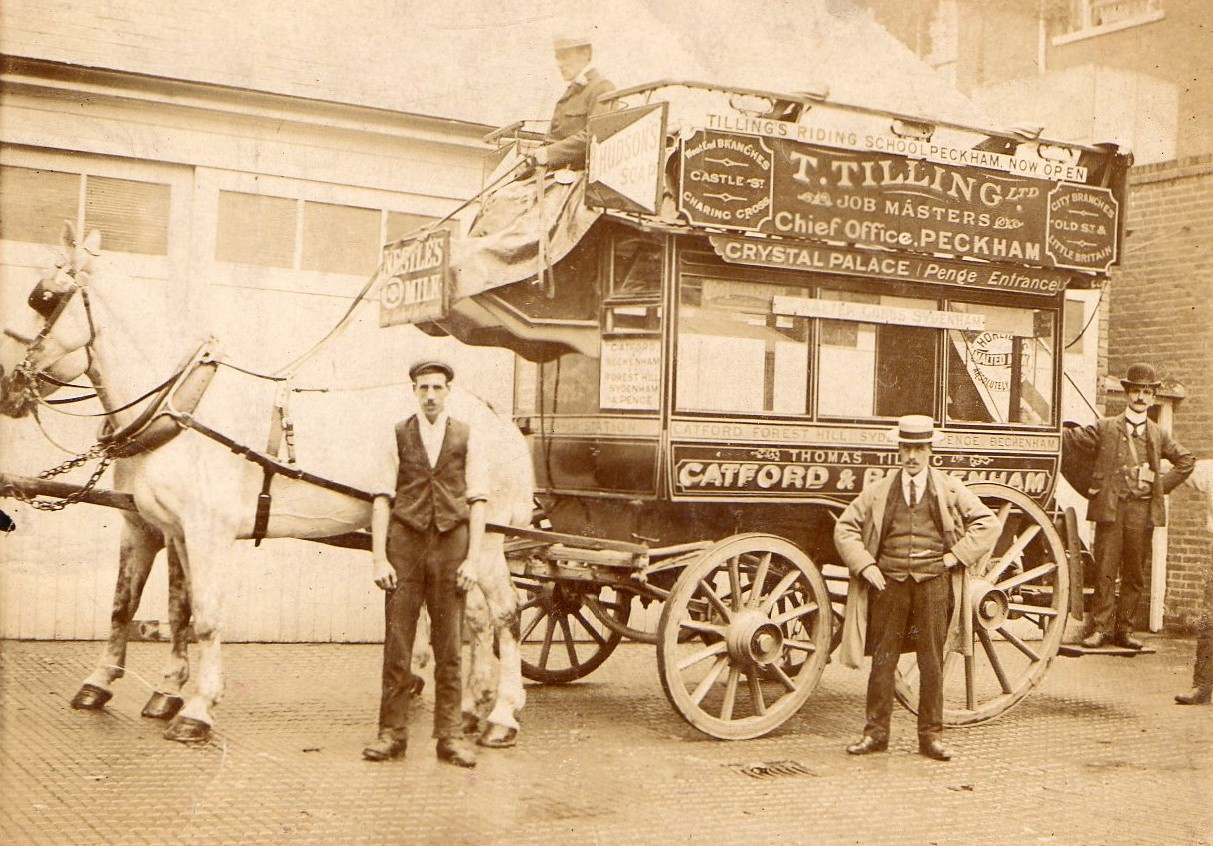
Tilling omnibus in use.

Starting in 1914, with the LGOC dominant in London, the company looked to the rest of Britain outside London for growth. Tilling started to seek new markets in the provinces. The company began operating in Folkestone in 1914, Brighton in 1916, and Ipswich in 1919.

BET had entered into a similar agreement with LGOC in London, and was also expanding outside London. Instead of destructive rivalry, the two companies agreed to work in close co-operation. By 1928, a BET subsidiary, British Automobile Traction Company (BAT), had interests in nineteen bus companies, with Tilling being a co-owner of eleven of them, and at the same time was partly owned by Tilling itself. To simplify the arrangement, BAT was reconstructed with a new title, Tilling & British Automobile Traction Ltd (TBAT), and Tilling exchanged its shares in the various operating companies for an increased shareholding in the new company.

The railways of Britain had grown significantly and many companies had developed bus services. In 1923, most of these "pre-grouping" companies merged to form four mainline companies: Great Western Railway; Southern Railway; London, Midland and Scottish Railway; and London and North Eastern Railway. During the 1920s, the "Big Four" divested themselves of much of the operations of their bus networks by transferring their interests to Tilling and BET in exchange for shares.

The Tilling family's association with the company ended in 1929 with the death of Richard Tilling. In 1931, Thomas Tilling Ltd acquired the Bristol Tramways and Carriage Company, along with the Eastern Counties Omnibus Company, whose bus construction activities were renamed the Eastern Coach Works Ltd (ECW) in 1936.

In 1933, the new London Passenger Transport Board compulsorily acquired the 328 buses that made up Tilling's South London services. In 1935, Tilling took over Royal Blue, which was the premier express coach company in the South and West of England, with a network of routes stretching from Penzance to Margate and Bournemouth to London, having developed tours and local services around Bournemouth and the New Forest in the horse-drawn era and express coach services after the First World War.

Tilling and TBAT continued to trade successfully, but internal disagreements resulted in TBAT being wound up in 1942. The companies in TBAT were split between Tilling and BET, and the two groups continued to operate independently until nationalisation began in the late 1940s. Tilling Motor Services Ltd was formed from the break-up.

== Nationalisation ==
As part of the government's moves toward nationalisation of the transport industry, the Transport Act 1947 resulted in formation of the British Transport Commission (BTC). The railway companies were nationalised from 1 January 1948 with the result that their major stake in the Tilling and BET bus companies passed into public ownership from that date. Tilling sold its remaining holdings to the BTC at the beginning of 1949, as did the Scottish Motor Traction group.

Thomas Tilling (BTC) Ltd. was set up as a BTC subsidiary to run Tilling's London private hire business, which continued under nationalisation.

BET retained its independence but the BTC ultimately gained up to a 50% holding in 17 of its companies so, from 1949, there were still two major bus groups, the nationalised BTC (formerly Tilling) and BET (partly owned by the BTC). By 1955 the BTC and BET companies were often known as the "Associated Companies" since "the actual ownership of the buses [was] to a greater or less extent in the hands of one party". The ex-Tilling companies continued to be commonly referred to as the "Tilling Group" long after nationalisation and normally carried one of two standard liveries – a crimson red or a deep green (often referred to as Tilling Red and Tilling Green), each with cream relief. These liveries remained the standard after formation of the National Bus Company until a new corporate livery of NBC Poppy Red/White or NBC Leaf Green/White was introduced from late 1972. The 1930s acquisition of Bristol and ECW resulted in Bristol chassis and ECW bodywork remaining standard amongst former Tilling Group fleets through the 1970s.

On 1 January 1963, a new body, the Transport Holding Company (THC), took over the bus assets of the BTC, and in 1967, BET sold its remaining bus interests to THC. The National Bus Company was formed a year later, mainly from former Tilling and BET subsidiaries.

=== The "Tilling Group" – Tilling subsidiary bus companies taken over by the BTC ===
1. Brighton, Hove and District
2. Bristol Tramways
3. Caledonian
4. Crosville
5. Cumberland
6. Eastern Counties
7. Eastern National
8. Hants and Dorset
9. Lincolnshire Road Car
10. Southern National
11. Southern Vectis
12. Thames Valley
13. United Automobile Services
14. United Counties
15. Western National
16. West Yorkshire
17. Wilts & Dorset

After nationalisation, the group remained as a management unit within the BTC with the following changes:

- Caledonian was passed to Western SMT within the newly formed Scottish Omnibuses Group
- Mansfield District, Midland General and Notts and Derby Traction were added via Balfour Beatty and Midland Counties Electric Supply Company as a result of nationalisation of the electricity supply industry, 1 April 1948,
- Red & White, United Welsh and South Midland were added with the nationalisation of the Red & White Group in 1950.

== Non-nationalised Tilling Group ==
Following nationalisation of Thomas Tilling Ltd's bus interests, a number of subsidiaries continued under separate ownership as the Tilling Group. Tilling Group was taken over by BTR plc in 1983.

Companies within the Tilling Group post-1948 included:

- Tilcon (formerly Tilling Construction Services Ltd), producer of aggregates and ready-mixed concrete – formed in 1970 by the merger of three existing subsidiaries, sold by BTR to Minorco, now part of Anglo American plc, in November 1995
- Selwood, plant and pump manufacture, sales and hire – acquired 1972
- PASCON, created by merging Palmers, Selwood & Croker within Tilling Group, 1982, sold by BTR in 1994 and now renamed Selwood Pumps
- Heinemann, a publisher acquired in 1961
- Pretty Polly, a lady's hosiery manufacturer acquired in 1957
- Newey and Eyre, electrical and electronic distributors
- DCE including Vokes, dust control equipment
- InterMed, health care
- Graham Group, builders merchants
- Pilkingtons Tiles including Poole Pottery
- Cornhill Insurance, general insurance
- Rest Assured, beds and other furniture
