= Indigo (bus service) =

British bus service

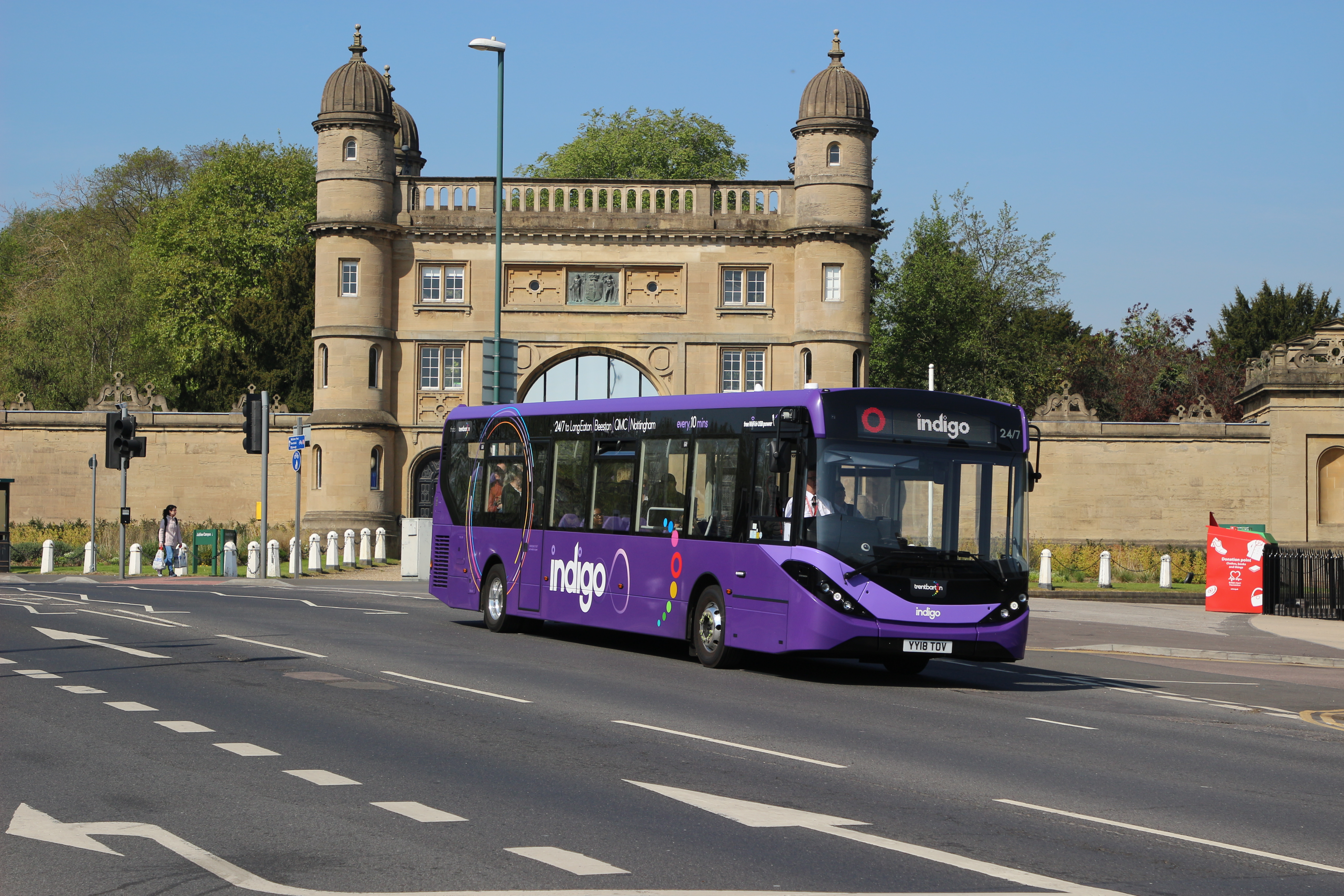
- An Indigo Enviro200 MMC heading towards Nottingham
- Commenced operation: 1992
- Service area: Derbyshire Nottinghamshire
- Service type: Local Bus Service
- Stops: Nottingham, Chillwell, Beeston, Long Eaton, Briar Gate, Breaston, Draycott, Borrowash, Spondon, Chaddesden, Derby
- Stations: Derby Nottingham
- Depots: Nottingham
- Fleet: Enviro200 MMC
- Operator: Trentbarton
- Website: https://www.trentbarton.co.uk/

Indigo is a bus service run by Trentbarton initially launched in 1992 as “Rainbow 5”. It links the cities of Derby and Nottingham via Long Eaton, Beeston, Draycott, Borrowash, QMC, University Campus, Dunkirk Lace Street, and Chaddesden.

== History ==
The route was launched in 1992 by Trentbarton as a stopping service to connect Derby and Nottingham with stops in Chaddesden, Spondon, Borrowash, Draycott, Breaston, Briar Gate, Long Eaton, Beeston, Chillwell and Nottingham. At launch the route operated a 10 minute frequency. The relaunched service saw a 5% increase in ridership in the first four weeks of operation.

The route remained relatively unchanged until 2002 when it was extended to East Midlands Airport, and Loughborough because of this extension the route was upgraded with 25 Scania Solars. Which replaced the Optare Excel's which had been running on the route previously.

In 2011 it was announced that the service would start running 24/7 between Nottingham and Long Eaton, as part of this it was announced that the last bus of the night would depart Derby at 03:00 at weekends and an increased timetable on a Sunday. In this timetable change there was also an increased frequency for the route with busses running every 6–7 minutes at between Nottingham and Long Eaton.

The extension to East Midlands Airport and Loughborough ran until 2012 when this section of the route was replaced by a revised skylink Nottingham route.

On 25 April 2013 a new promotion was announced where students would be able to board with a fare of £1 between Beeston and Nottingham. The premise of the marketing campaign was to get more students to use the service to travel into the city by offering a lower fare compared to other operators and the tram network in Nottingham. In July 2013 rival company Yourbus announced a competing service called Y5 that would operate between Beeston and Derby following the Indigo route. The route operated until the companies collapse in 2019. In September 2013 Trentbarton announced a new service called Zoom which would operate between Long Eaton and Derby however would be an express service to and from Borrowash skipping out Chaddesden and Spondon. The route ran until it was withdrawn in 2017 having been unable to attract sufficient passenger numbers.

In 2018 the route suffered disruption due to a pay and conditions dispute between Nottingham based Barton drivers represented by the Unite union and Trentbarton.

Being one of a few flagship commercial services the Rainbow 5 has regularly been upgraded often receiving the first set of vehicles that the company operates, it was the first route to receive Optare Excel's, Scania Solar's and Wright Eclipse Urbans.

== Connect 5 ==
An additional route was added branded as “Connect 5” that provided a circular service connecting the Nottingham suburb of Toton and the Indigo at Chilwell retail park and Westpoint. With a frequency of every 15 minutes later reduced to every 30. The route was operated with Optare Solo (449, FE02 KDV). The service ran in the late 2000's and was discontinued in 2011 after a few years of operations due to low passenger demand.

== Route ==
The service operates a 10-minute frequency between Nottingham and Long Eaton via QMC, Beeston and Chillwell. 3 busses an hour return to Nottingham from Long Eaton whilst 3 busses continue to Derby. The service operates a 20-minute frequency between Long Eaton and Derby via Briar Gate, Breaston, Draycott, Borrowash, Spondon and Chaddesden before terminating in Derby.

Between 2002 and 2012 Indigo services ran south to East Midlands Airport and Loughborough these runs were displayed with the "5B" markings on the destination display. However, when the Skylink Nottingham changed operator from Nottingham City Transport to Trentbarton the route was revised and the indigo was no longer required to service these areas

Until its closure in 2017 the Nottingham terminus of the route was Broadmarsh Bus Station, after its closure the final stop on Nottingham bound services became Friar Lane. Despite the redeveloped bus station reopening in 2022 Trentbarton kept the terminus at Friar Lane.

== Fleet ==
The route initially launched with a fleet of 20 Optare Deltas painted in the standard Trentbarton livery with a rainbow 5 decals on the side. These operated between 1992 and 1998.

In 1998 the Optare Excel was used to replace the Optare Deltas, a fleet of 20 Excel’s were used to operate the route until their replacement in 2003. These were the first busses to feature the new indigo colour replacing the standard red that the previous generation of busses wore. This would be the origin of the routes name “Indigo”. These were the first Optare Excels that Trentbarton would receive and operate.

In 2003 Trentbarton received its first 25 Scania Solars which were branded up as Rainbow 5 began running on the route not long after. The vehicles were numbered (601-625). Rainbow 5 was the first route to feature the new style livery with a full purple body as well as the new font style.

For a short period an Optare Tempo (306, FD54 JYF) was branded for the Rainbow 5 to test its suitability on the route. Ultimately Trentbarton decided that Wright Eclipse Urbans would be a better fit leaving it as the only Optare Tempo ever branded for the route.

In 2008 a fleet of 25 Wright eclipse Urbans were introduced to the route as part of its rebrand from Rainbow 5 to Indigo. The vehicles were issued with fleet numbers (701-725). The vehicles featured a new standard for Trentbarton which included leather seats and air conditioning. The services ran every 6–7 minutes and included additional vehicles to serve the route’s extension to East Midlands airport. In 2017 the first Eclipse Urban's transferred to other routes across the network in preparation for the new busses that Indigo would receive. Several routes that benefited from the displaced busses included the Calverton connection, Ilkeston Flyer& the Villager.

In 2018 a fleet of 15 brand new Enviro200 MMC busses joined the fleet styled as ultra low emissions vehicles designed to improve air quality within the operation upon entry into service they were numbered (201-215) vehicle 216 joined the route later. The vehicles feature passenger comforts such as USB and wireless charging, Next stop announcements and sunroofs. These vehicles remain in use on the route.

== Incidents ==
In August 2023 an indigo vehicle was stolen from Peveril Drive in Nottingham whilst the driver was away from the bus on a break. The bus was driven recklessly and resulted in other road users to take evasive action causing damage to their own vehicles. The bus was recovered a short while later in Borrowash having crashed into another vehicle and causing £5,000 in damages.

In September 2023 (207, YY18 TPO) suffered a thermal incident in Beeston which resulted in it being written off due to the extensive fire damage. After the incident “Mango spare” (208, YY18 TPU) was rebranded to indigo to maintain 15 dedicated vehicles to the route.

== See also ==
Trentbarton - Route operator

Skylink Nottingham - Route operated by trentbarton

Wellglade - Parent company

Nottingham Express Transit - Tram operator in Nottingham

Nottingham City Transport - Competitor in Nottingham area

Yourbus - Competitor on the route between 2013-2019
