= Optare Delta =

Step-entrance bus body on DAF SB220 chassis

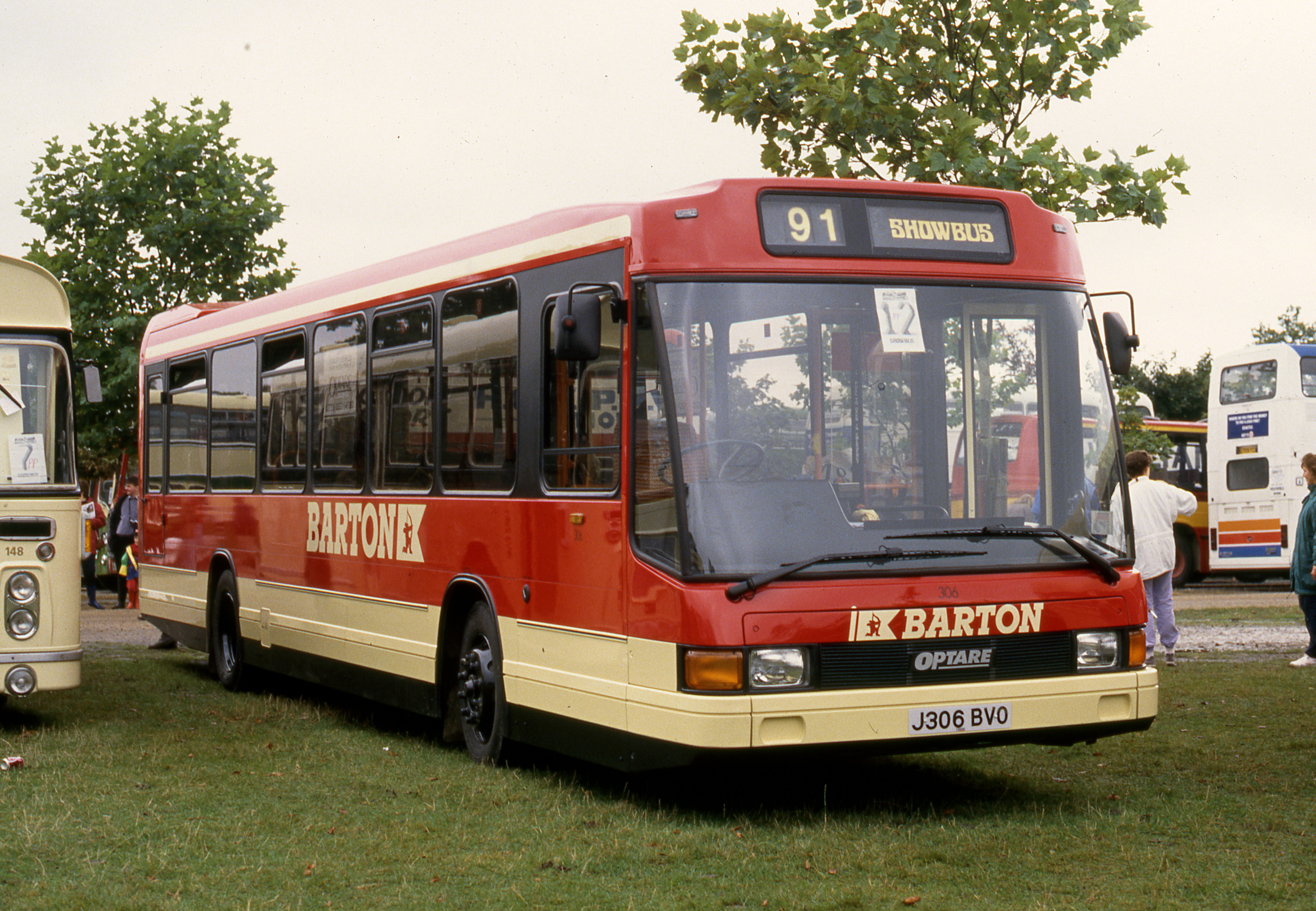
- Barton Buses Optare Delta at Showbus 1991 at Woburn Abbey

Overview
- Manufacturer: Optare
- Production: 1988 - 1999
- Assembly: Cross Gates, Leeds, England

Body and chassis
- Doors: 1 - 3
- Floor type: Step entrance
- Chassis: DAF SB220
- Related: Optare Sigma

Powertrain
- Engine: DAF LC1160
- Capacity: 47-53 seated, 24 standing
- Transmission: ZF Ecomat 4HP500 4-speed automatic ZF Ecomat 5HP500 5-speed automatic

Dimensions
- Length: 11.95 metres (39.2 ft)
- Width: 2.50 metres (8 ft 2 in)
- Height: 3.00 metres (9.84 ft)

Chronology
- Successor: Optare Excel

The Optare Delta is a single-deck bus body manufactured by Optare between 1990 and 1999 on the DAF SB220 chassis. The Delta was Optare's first full-size transit bus body, with the company having previously built minibus bodies on Volkswagen LT55 and Mercedes-Benz 811D chassis. The Delta was succeeded by the Optare Excel from 1995 onwards, with production of the Delta body ceasing in 1999.

== Design ==
First announced in early 1988, the Optare Delta was formally launched as the first body for the UK market to be fitted to the DAF SB220 chassis in June 1988. The Delta bodywork featured a distinctive sloping one-piece windscreen with a separately mounted destination display, as well as gasket glazed tinted windows in the passenger cabin, and was constructed with an Alusuisse bolted aluminium frame, which Optare had gained the exclusive rights to use in Great Britain. At a length of 11.6 metres (38 ft), the Delta was marketed to three configurations: as a standard city bus, carrying 53 seated and 24 standing passengers, or to either city or intercity specification with 47 passengers seated hard plastic seats.

The Delta was powered by a DAF LC1160 11.6 litres (2.6 imp gal; 3.1 US gal) turbocharged six-cylinder engine, and it could be optioned with either ZF Ecomat 4HP500 or 5HP500 automatic gearbox. The Delta's front suspension could "kneel", allowing the 310 millimetres (12 in) entrance step to lower to a height of 200 millimetres (7.9 in), while air springs and a centrally mounted steering column, unusual for British buses at the time, were also provided.

Production of the Delta eventually ceased in 1999, around the time the second-generation low-floor Optare Excel began entering production.

=== Articulated designs ===
The Delta's design was originally utilised by Optare as part of proposals for a trolleybus system in Leeds. Though the trolleybus proposal did not progress further, Optare instead redesigned the bus to be a diesel double-fronted articulated bus on DAF SB220 chassis. A mock-up bus was built, and an order for 12 articulated Deltas was considered in 1992 by Go-Ahead Northern when the operator proposed a guided busway serving Newcastle upon Tyne and Sunderland, however no orders resulted due to the busway never being approved.

An articulated Optare Delta was eventually developed by vehicle fitters Sutrak UK and BTSE 2000 in 1992, designed for use as a European roadshow vehicle by American multi-level marketing company Amway. Named the 'Amway Showcase', the vehicle was built on a left-hand drive MAN articulated chassis and LAG Panoramic coach framework, using a combination of Bova Futura coach mouldings, the Optare Delta's front fascia and the LAG Panormaic's rear fascia. Internally, the Amway Showcase featured a broadcasting studio, a portable stage, a NICAM stereo video system, and an IBM AS/400 computer for demonstrating Amway's customer support system. This bus was exported to Ireland for use by Dublin radio station FM104 in May 1996, however the bus was eventually scrapped after the collapse of its suspension frame had rendered it inoperable.

== Operators ==
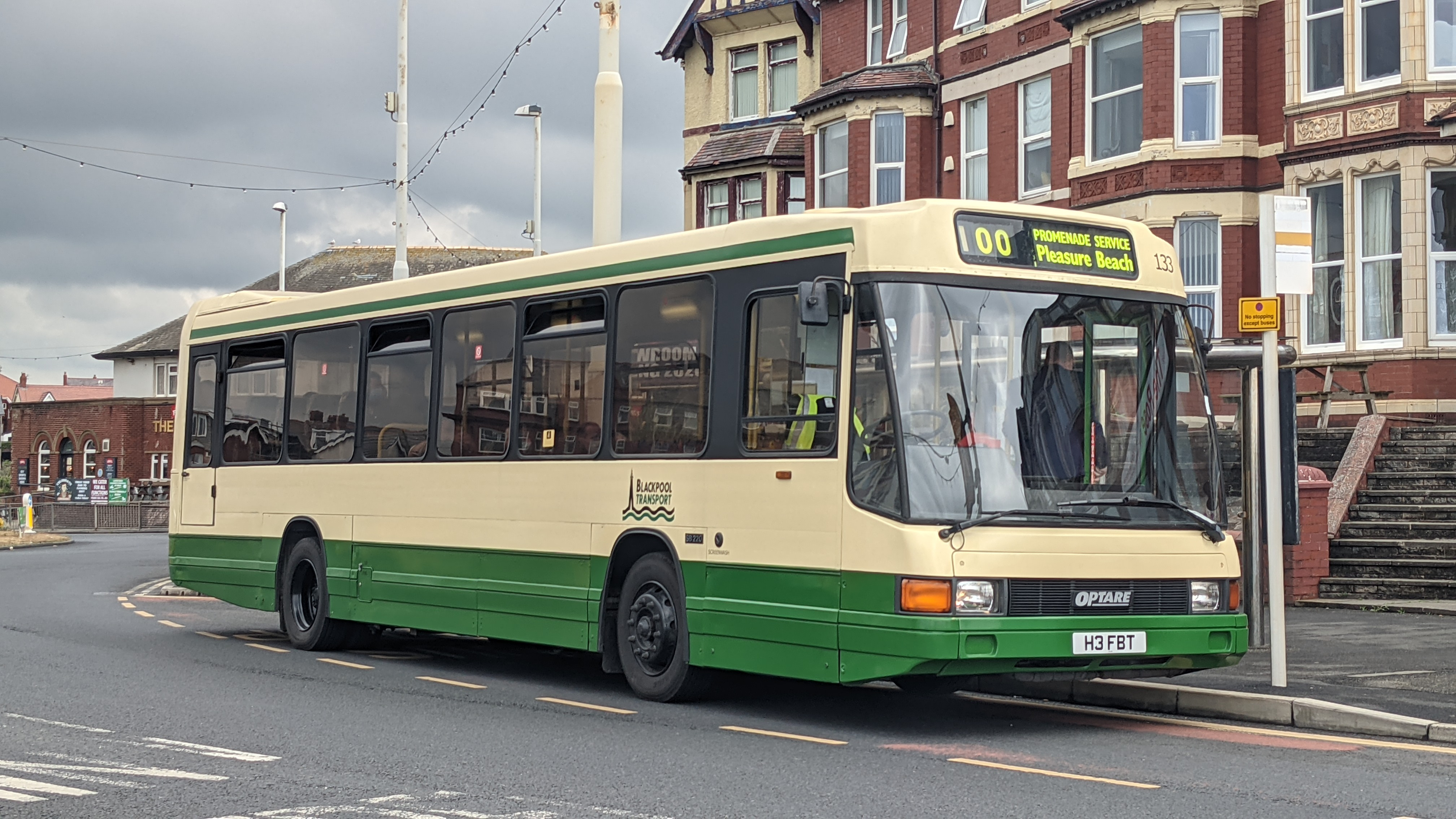
Preserved Blackpool Transport Optare Delta on the Blackpool Promenade in July 2021

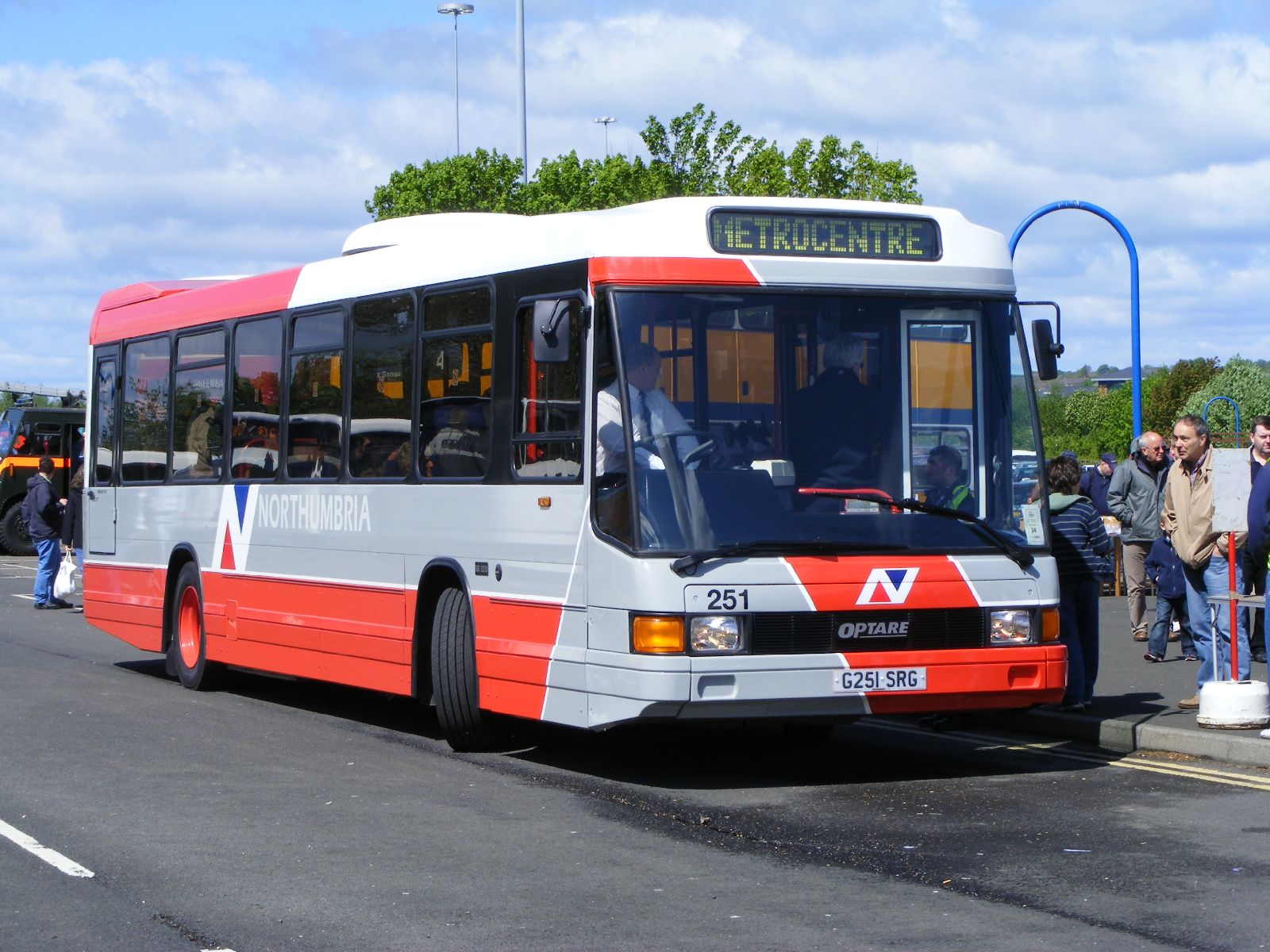
Preserved Northumbria Motor Services Optare Delta at the MetroCentre in Gateshead in May 2009

The combined Trentbarton companies were the largest purchaser of Optare Deltas, purchasing a total of 51 between 1991 and 1993, with all but ten being delivered to Trent Buses, predominantly for use on the operator's Rainbow Routes network.

The second largest operator of Deltas was British Airways, who purchased 49 of the type between 1990 and 1993 for airside passenger transfer services at Heathrow Airport. These Deltas were unique in having three entrance doors, with a centre offside exit door situated opposite a nearside exit door, reducing seating capacity to up to 40 passengers; a batch of six Deltas delivered for use on a ten-minute landside shuttle between Terminal 1 and Terminal 4 had their doors sealed by HM Customs and Excise on each journey to eliminate the need for re-checking passengers and luggage at the destination terminal.

London Regional Transport's London Buses business units took delivery of 35 Deltas between 1990 and 1992, with most being built to dual-door configuration. After initial examples were bought for evaluation by London General and East London in 1989, 19 dual-door Deltas were delivered to East London in April 1992, and prior to this, seven Deltas were also delivered to Westlink in 1990.

Go-Ahead Northern first took delivery of 14 Deltas in 1989, which were followed by an additional five in 1990. Competing operator Northumbria Motor Services took delivery of 17 between 1989 and 1990, while elsewhere in the North East of England, other operators included United Automobile Services, OK Motor Services and Teesside Motor Traction.

Other notable operators of the Optare Delta included PMT of Stoke-on-Trent, taking delivery of nine in 1990, Blackpool Transport, who first purchased eight Deltas in 1990, going on to purchase 20 more between 1991 and 1993, Yorkshire Rider, who took five Deltas in 1990 as part of type evaluations for a guided busway project, Ipswich Buses, who took its first Delta in 1991, following with another four delivered in 1994, and Fylde Borough Transport, who took three Deltas in 1991. Among the Delta's final customers were Reading Buses, who after first purchasing ten Deltas in 1989, took delivery of a second batch of ten between 1995 and 1996.
