= Optare Sigma =

Step-entrance single-deck bus body on Dennis Lance chassis

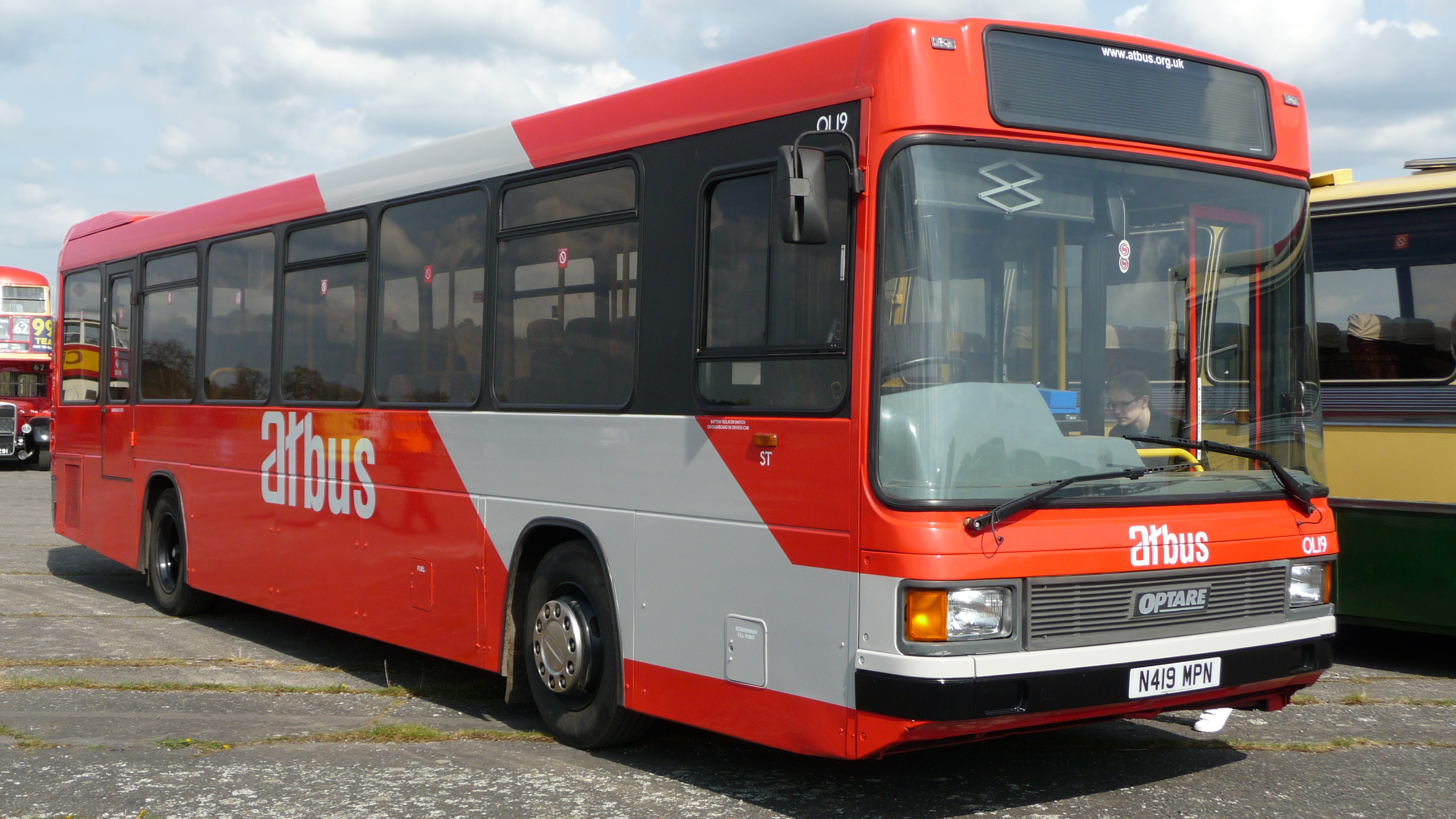
- Atbus Optare Sigma bodied Dennis Lance in 2009

Overview
- Manufacturer: Optare
- Production: 1994 - 1996
- Assembly: Cross Gates, Leeds, England

Body and chassis
- Doors: 1-2
- Floor type: Step entrance
- Chassis: Dennis Lance
- Related: Optare Vecta; Optare Spectra

Powertrain
- Engine: Cummins C6T
- Capacity: 47-51 seated, 24 standing
- Transmission: ZF Ecomat 4HP500; ZF Ecomat 5HP500

Dimensions
- Length: 11.8 metres (39 ft)
- Width: 2.5 metres (8 ft 2 in)
- Height: 3.2 metres (10 ft)
- Curb weight: 16,800 kilograms (37,000 lb)

Chronology
- Successor: Optare Excel; Optare Prisma

The Optare Sigma was a step-entrance single-deck bus body manufactured by Optare between 1994 and 1996 on the Dennis Lance chassis.

== Design ==
Launched in April 1994, the full-size Sigma body was produced exclusively on the Dennis Lance chassis, beginning an effort by Optare to produce bodies for a more diverse range of chassis following the collapse of the United Bus manufacturing group. The Sigma body was constructed using the same Alusuisse bolted aluminium frame system used on the Vecta mid-size bus body, and the styling closely resembled the Vecta, albeit in longer form. Options included guide wheels for use on a guided busway, dual door configuration as well as a centre offside door for use on airport bus services.

The Sigma had a low entrance step height of 314 millimetres (12.4 in), with a second step taking passengers into a seating compartment with capacity for up to 51 seated passengers; the Sigma's seats were mounted on tracking floor rails, allowing for seating to configured to the individual needs of operators. Other interior features included options for luggage racks and air conditioning, as well as tinted side and rear windows.

== Operators ==
Compared to the Vecta, a significantly smaller number of Optare Sigmas were produced. Only three operators bought the Sigma in large batches: the largest was Brighton & Hove, who took delivery of 20 Sigmas in 1996, while Trent Buses additionally took delivery of 17 Sigmas in late 1995. Gateshead & District took delivery of 14 Sigmas in 1994 for use on services in Bishop Auckland competing with local independent OK Motor Services.

Two other operators purchased single a Sigmas each. These were Ipswich Buses, who took delivery of the first production Sigma in 1994, the only Sigma built to dual-door configuration, and Busways Travel Services, who took delivery of a Sigma later in 1994 for use on a Newcastle upon Tyne to Gateshead MetroCentre shuttle service.
