= Optare Excel =

Low-floor integral single-deck bus

Optare Excel NABI 700SE
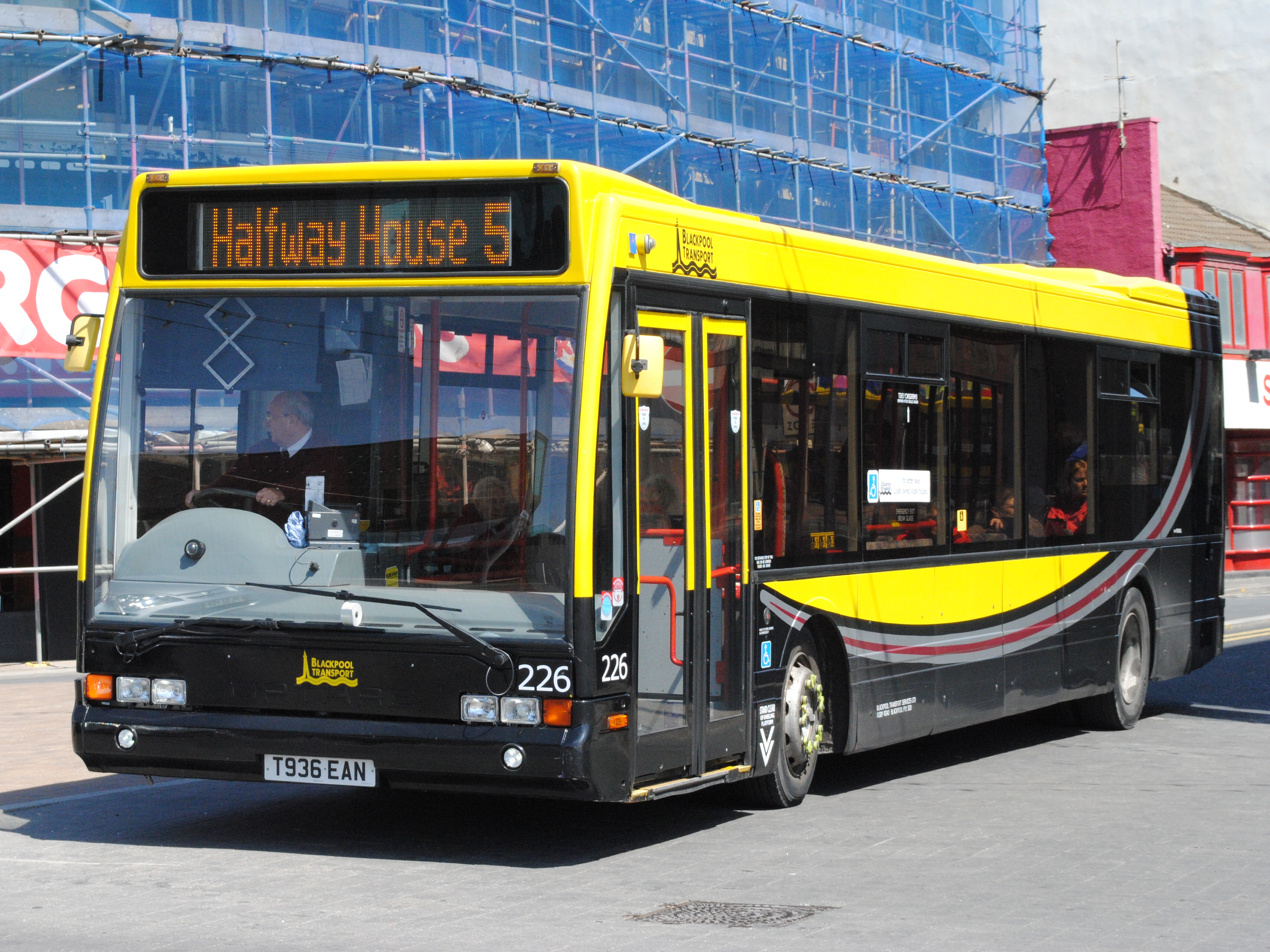
- Blackpool Transport Optare Excel in Blackpool in May 2013

Overview
- Manufacturer: Optare
- Production: 1995-2004
- Assembly: Cross Gates, Leeds, West Yorkshire
- Designer: Capoco Design

Body and chassis
- Doors: 1 or 2
- Floor type: Low floor Step-entrance (NABI 700SE)

Powertrain
- Engine: Cummins 6BT; Mercedes-Benz OM906LA
- Capacity: 27-48 seated, 16-22 standing
- Power output: 160 bhp (119 kW)
- Transmission: Allison 'World Series' B300R

Dimensions
- Length: 9.6 m (31 ft); 10 m (33 ft); 10.7 m (35 ft); 11.5 m (38 ft); 11.8 m (39 ft)
- Width: 2.5 m (8 ft 2 in)
- Height: 3 m (9.8 ft)
- Curb weight: 8,560 kg (18,872 lb)

Chronology
- Predecessor: Optare Delta; Optare Sigma
- Successor: Optare Tempo

The Optare Excel is a low-floor full-size single-decker bus manufactured by Optare. Manufactured as an integral bus, the Excel was launched in 1995 as one of the first fully low-floor single-deck buses in the United Kingdom, replacing the step-entrance Optare Sigma on Dennis Lance chassis.

== Design ==
Launched in October 1995, the Optare Excel was the manufacturer's first full-size low-floor city bus, built with aluminium and fibreglass panels over a steel frame as opposed to previous Optare products using the Alusuisse system, and featured distinctive Capoco Design styling. Most notably, early Excels included a simple flat panel with embossed Optare lettering set between two pairs of twin headlamps, which was situated below a very large one-piece curved windscreen. Power came from a Cummins 6BT 6-cylinder turbo-diesel engine capable of producing 160 brake horsepower (120 kW), which was mated with a Allison 'World Series' B300R automatic transmission.

The Excel featured a 320 millimetres (13 in) low step at the entrance door, capable of being lowered to 240 millimetres (9.4 in) at the kerbside via the 'kneeling' function of the integrally-built chassis, and the Excel's interior featured a fully-flat floor up to the rear axle, where two steps led to raised rear seats. Built to 9.6 metres (31 ft), 10 metres (33 ft), 10.7 metres (35 ft), 11.5 metres (38 ft) and 11.8 metres (39 ft) lengths, passenger-carrying capacity ranged from between 36 seated and 16 standing to 48 seated and 22 standing.

=== Excel 2 ===
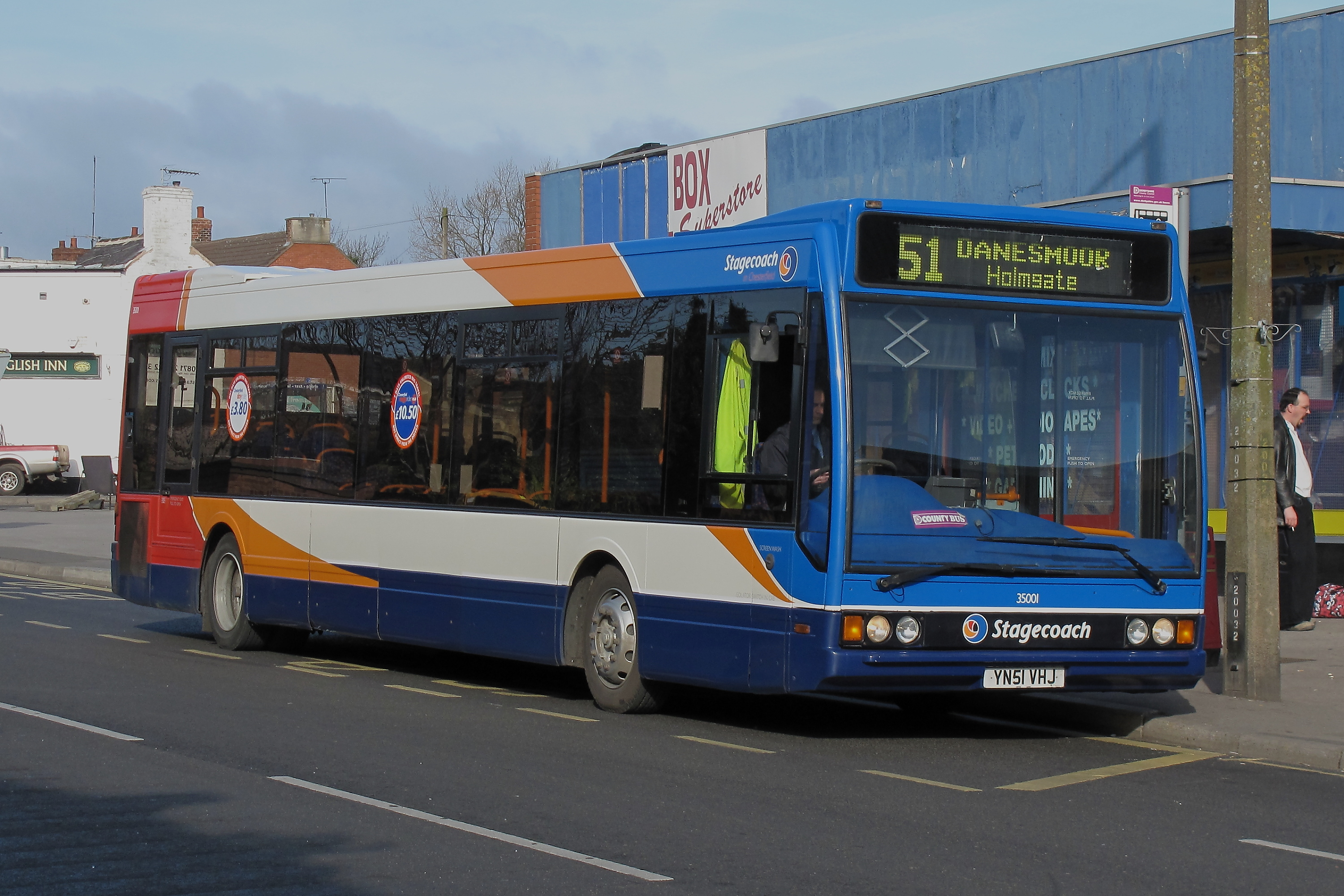
Stagecoach in Chesterfield Optare Excel 2 in Clay Cross in March 2009

The Excel was updated in 1999, with the front similar to that of the Optare Solo and with round headlights, two less rear lights, and a repositioned fuel-filler cap. A Mercedes-Benz OM906LA engine was also made available as an option alongside the standard Cummins 6BT.

This updated Excel was known as the Excel 2, which replaced the Delta which by then had finished production. The original Excel was still sold alongside the Excel 2 until it was discontinued by Optare in late 2000. Excel 2s were only built in 10.7 m (35 ft), 11.5 m (38 ft) and 11.8 m (39 ft) configurations.

The Excel 2 was itself replaced by the Optare Tempo upon its launch in October 2004.

== Operators ==
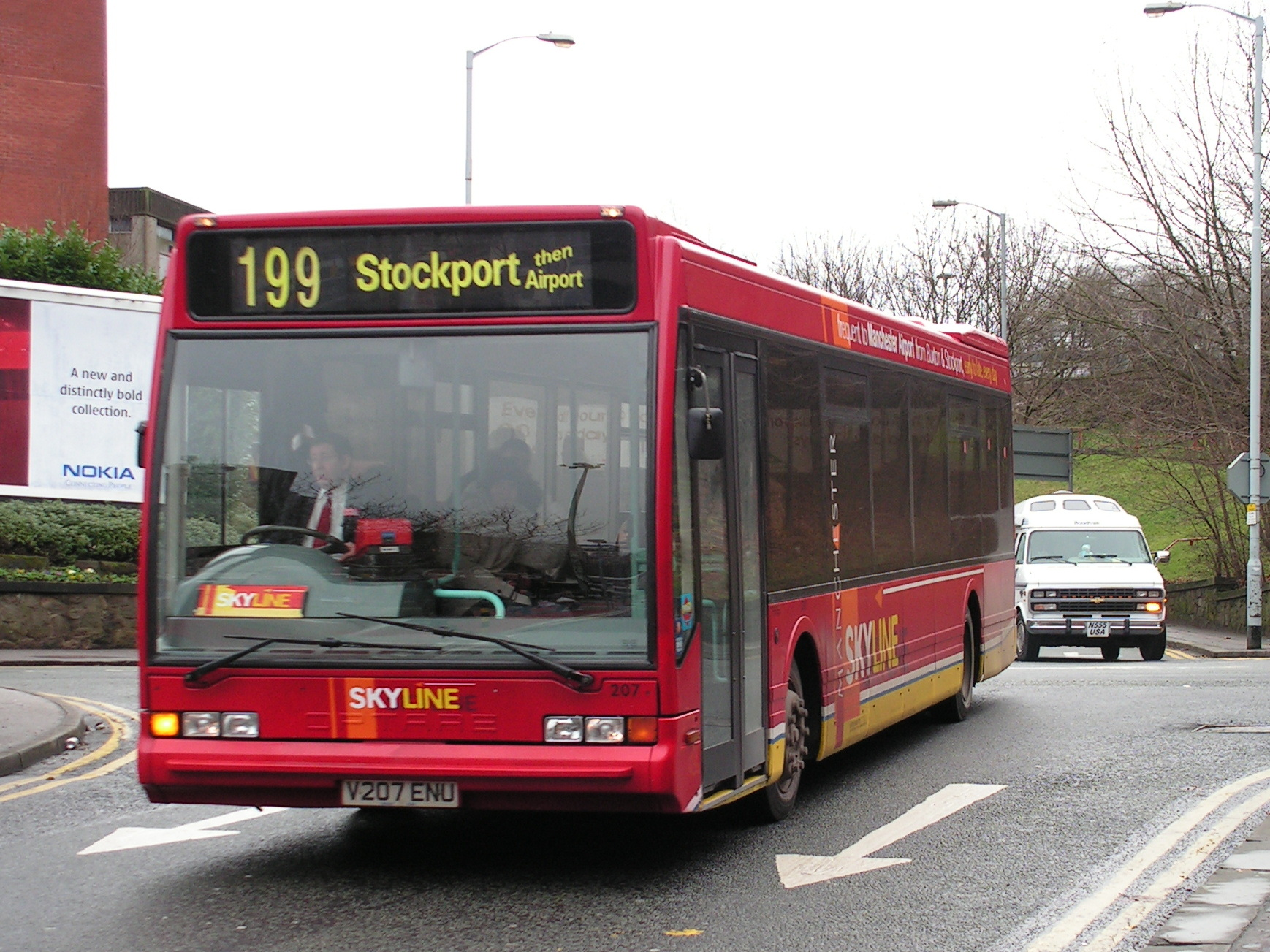
Trentbarton Skyline branded Optare Excel in Stockport in December 2004

The first eight production Excels began to be delivered to Blackpool Transport in May 1996, with orders following from Nottingham City Transport and Reading Buses. Trent Buses were the overall largest operator of Excels and Excel 2s, ordering a total of 112 of the type from 1998 to 2001.

Another major operator of Excels were Reading Buses, who after taking delivery of their first seven in 1997, purchased a further 45 Excels and Excel 2s between 1997 and 2002. Thirty-five Excels were also delivered to Travel West Midlands for use in Wolverhampton in early 1999, while East Yorkshire Motor Services purchased a total of 24 Excels between 1996 and 1999 for services in Kingston upon Hull and Scarborough.

In London, Metrobus took delivery of ten Excels during 1996, with London United also purchasing six Excels in 1997, initially branded for use on route 371. Other London operators included Travel London, Capital Citybus and Thorpes, the latter purchasing four Excels for operation on the wheelchair-friendly Stationlink service.

Sixteen Excel 2s were purchased by the Stagecoach Group in 2001 for operation in Worksop with their East Midlands subsidiary. Fifteen Excels were delivered to Cardiff Bus between October and November 1997, ten were delivered to First Leicester in 1997, while Go North East also purchased numerous examples. Smaller operators of Excels included Kinchbus, Springfield Coaches of Wigan, Swanbrook Transport, and Williamsons Motorways of Knockin. Three Excels were also uniquely built as 'Earthstation' shuttle vehicles for a British Telecom sightseeing service around the Goonhilly Downs Site of Special Scientific Interest in September 1996.

=== Exports ===
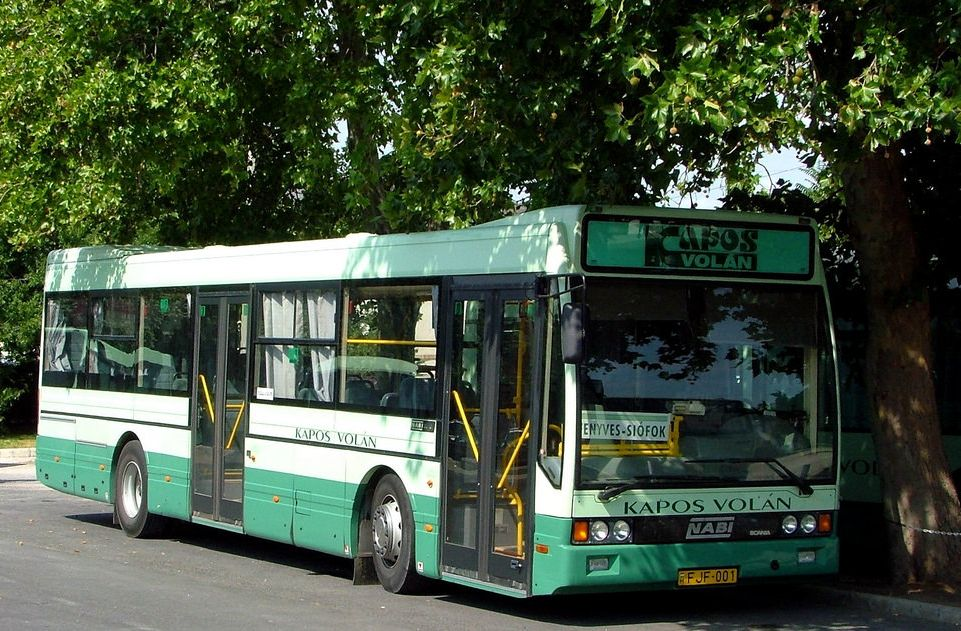
Kapos Volán NABI 700SE left-hand drive Excel 2 in Hungary

Optare also built a small export market for the Excel in both Malta and Hungary. A single 10.6 metres (35 ft) Excel was exported to Malta as the country's first low-floor bus for use by Cancu Supreme Travel of Żejtun, with features for the Maltese bus market including the removal of the internal heating system, larger sliding windows, an uprated Cummins engine producing 215 brake horsepower (160 kW) and an overall seating capacity of 45.

In 2002, the Optare Excel 2 was rebadged by NABI, Optare's parent company at the time, and launched as the NABI 700SE for the Hungarian market. The NABI 700SE was built to left-hand drive step-entrance configuration, with options for either two or three entrance and exit doors, and capable of carrying up to 85 passengers. The first four 700SEs entered service in Kaposvar with the Kaposvar Transit Company in August 2002.
