= Wright Solar Fusion =

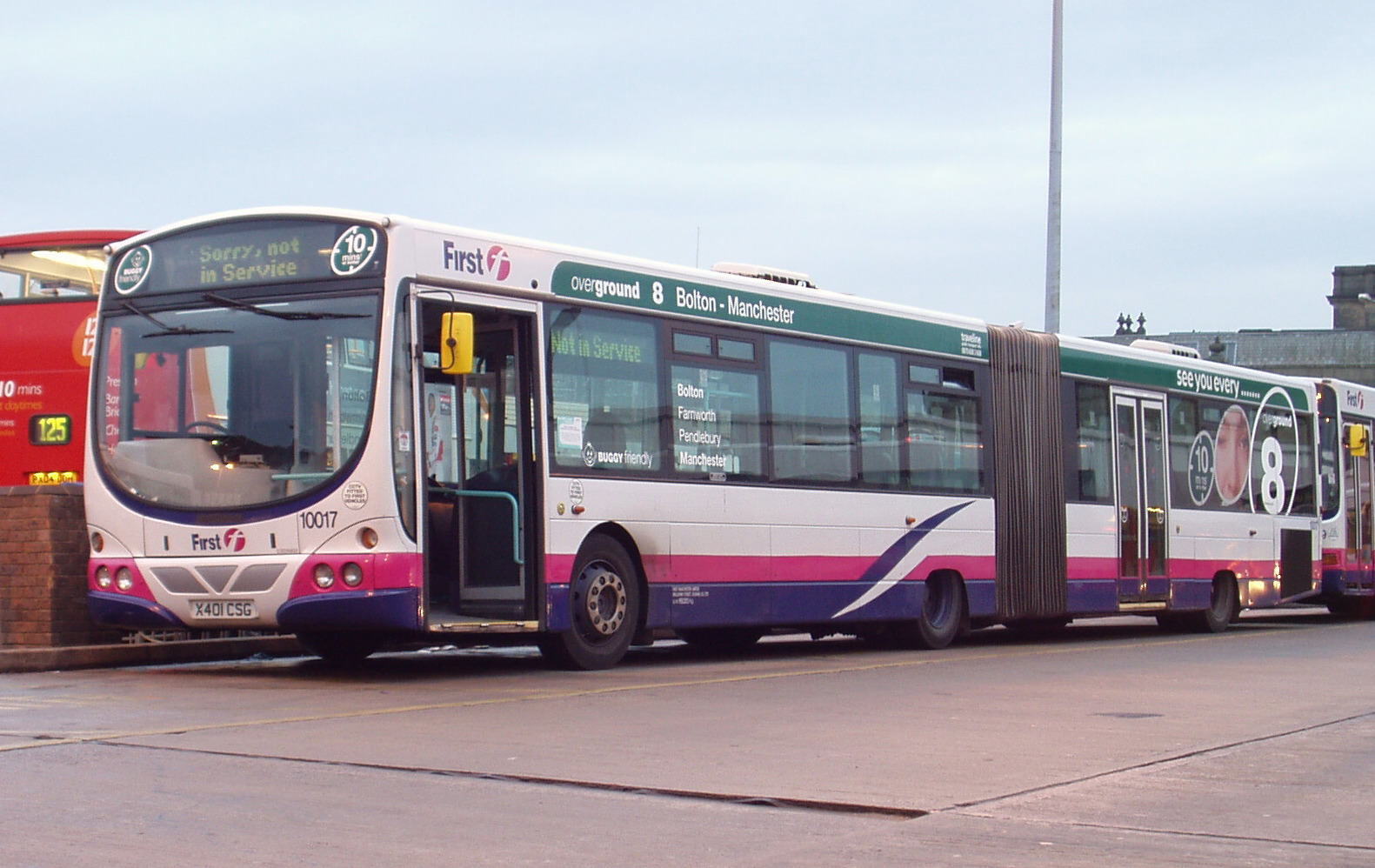
- First Manchester Wright Solar Fusion bodied Scania L94UA at Bolton bus station in November 2007

Overview
- Manufacturer: Wrightbus
- Production: 2001-2002
- Assembly: Ballymena, Northern Ireland

Body and chassis
- Doors: 2 or 3
- Floor type: Low entry
- Chassis: Scania L94UA
- Related: Wright Solar

Powertrain
- Engine: Scania
- Capacity: 58 or 59 seated
- Transmission: ZF Friedrichshafen

Dimensions
- Length: 17.94 metres
- Width: 2.50 metres
- Height: 3.08 metres

The Wright Solar Fusion was a type of low floor articulated bus body built on the Scania L94UA chassis by Wrightbus. It was the articulated version of the Wright Solar. Only 11 were produced with Nottingham City Transport purchasing five, Go North East purchasing four and First Manchester and Doig's of Glasgow one each.

The Solar Fusion shares a similar bodywork style to the Wright Eclipse Fusion with the main differences being the window and seating before the rear exit doors, and the full rear window due to the transverse engine of the Scania L94 chassis, rather than the vertically mounted fitted to the B7LA chassis.

A First Manchester Solar Fusion was involved in an accident in 2016 on the M60 motorway. Although there were no casualties, the bus was later scrapped after being stored at Manchester's Oldham depot.

One of Nottingham City Transport's Solar Fusions was preserved by Nottingham Heritage Vehicles, while another was converted into a static library for the Alderman Pounder Infant School in Chilwell.
