= OK Motor Services =

Former British bus operator

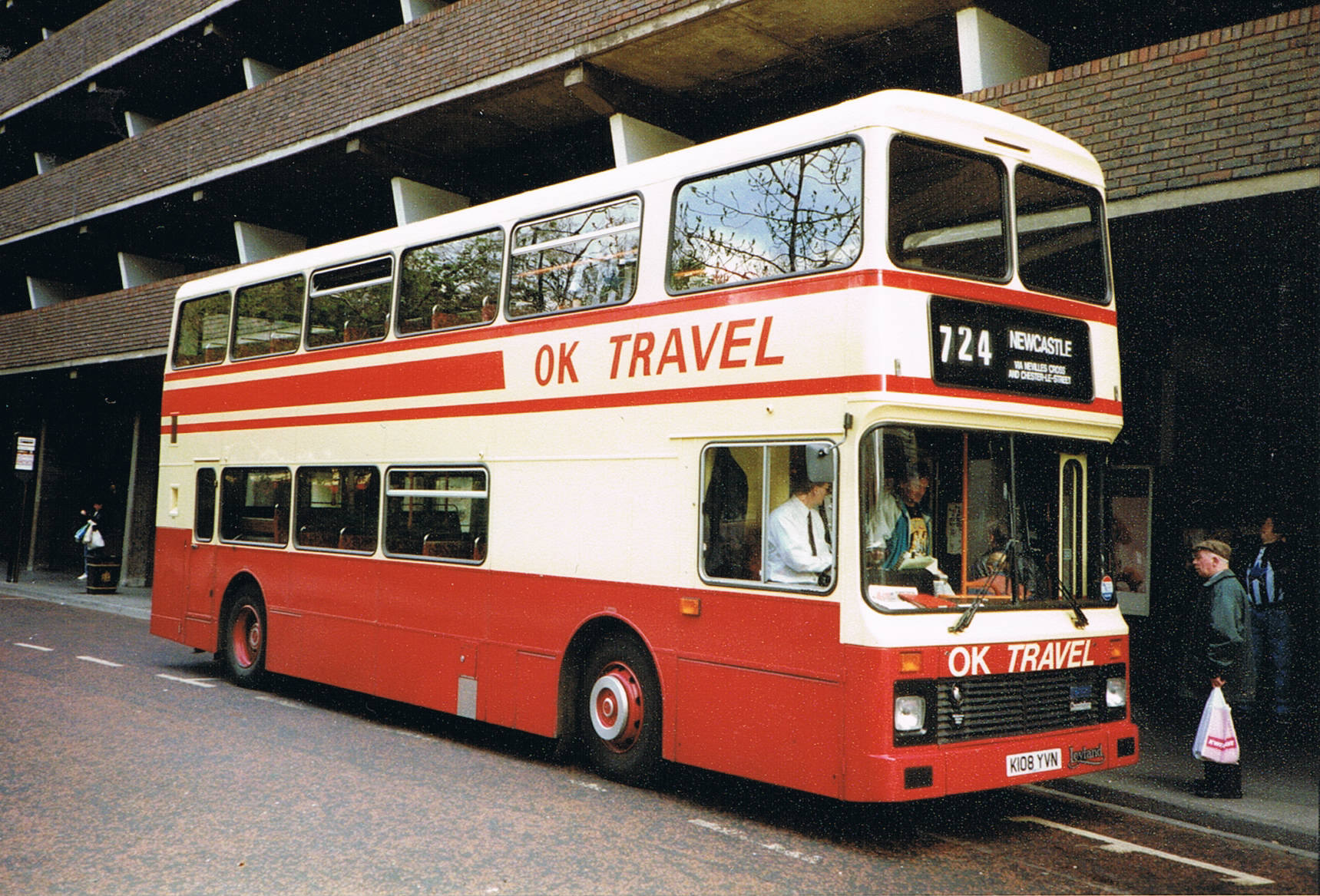
- Founded: April 1912; 113 years ago
- Ceased operation: March 1995; 30 years ago
- Headquarters: Evenwood, County Durham; England
- Service area: County Durham; Tyne and Wear
- Service type: Bus and coach
- Owner: Wade Emmerson

OK Motor Services was a bus company, which operated local and regional bus services in County Durham and Tyne and Wear, England. The company was purchased by the Go-Ahead Group in March 1995. Following rationalisation and rebranding, the OK Motor Services livery disappeared from the roads, as services were integrated with Go North East.

== History ==
The company was founded on 6 April 1912 in Evenwood, near Bishop Auckland in County Durham, England, by Wade Emmerson. The first route ran from Bishop Auckland to Evenwood.

The original name was Gaunless Valley Motor Services, with the name OK Motor Services coming from a consortium of operators who started to run from the area to the Great North Exhibition in Newcastle, in the late-1920s. The name OK was used and means as it suggests – the service was "OK".

The first garage was located in Evenwood, near Bishop Auckland, with an office being opened within Bishop Auckland Town Hall during the early 1930s. The site of the main garage was acquired and developed during the 1930s in North Bondgate.

A further depot was opened at Heaton, with further depots at St Helen Auckland and Shotton Colliery acquired, along with the business of F Lockey & Sons.

During the early 1980s, the company replaced OK Motor Services name with OK Travel, and introduced a simplified version of the eye-catching livery of dark red, light red and cream.

After deregulation, the company acquired two further depots. A depot at Team Valley was acquired to replace Heaton, with a further depot constructed in Peterlee, as a replacement for that at Shotton Colliery.

=== Takeover by Go-Ahead Group ===
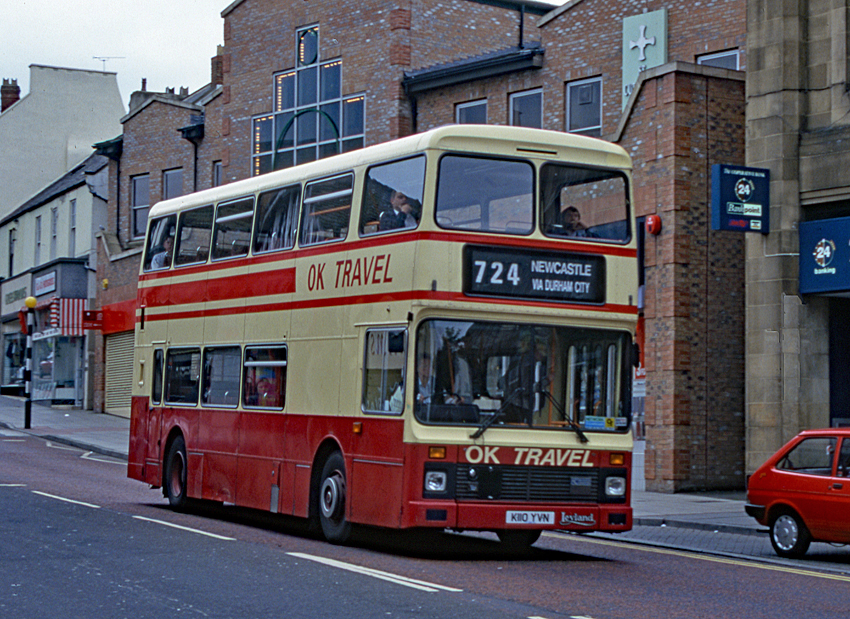
A Leyland Olympian, seen in Chester-le-Street in June 1996, following acquisition by Go North East.

Go-Ahead Group had already made approaches to Wade Emmerson Sr., who ran the business, but the shareholders had no interest in selling it. However, Go-Ahead was advised that if the business did become available for sale, they would be given the first refusal.

Wade Emmerson Sr. died unexpectedly in August 1994. Wade Emmerson Jr., the company's majority shareholder, was approached by Go-Ahead, which expressed its continued interest in acquiring the business. He was also approached by other operators, including Northumbria Motor Services, but decided to enter detailed negotiations only with Go-Ahead. In March 1995, Go-Ahead Group acquired OK Motor Services for £5.4 million.

Following the acquisition, many of OK's staff, including the general manager, Charles Marshall, became employees of Go-Ahead. OK initially became one of Go-Ahead's locally managed subsidiaries, with Marshall remaining in charge. Go-Ahead later took steps to streamline the business, with several of the group's earlier acquisitions transferred to OK. However, the local identities were soon abandoned, and the OK name disappeared.

The garage at Bishop Auckland was demolished, following closure by Go North East in March 2006, with a limited number of services transferred to Go North East's depot at Chester-le-Street, with most local services transferring to Arriva North East.

=== A brief revival ===
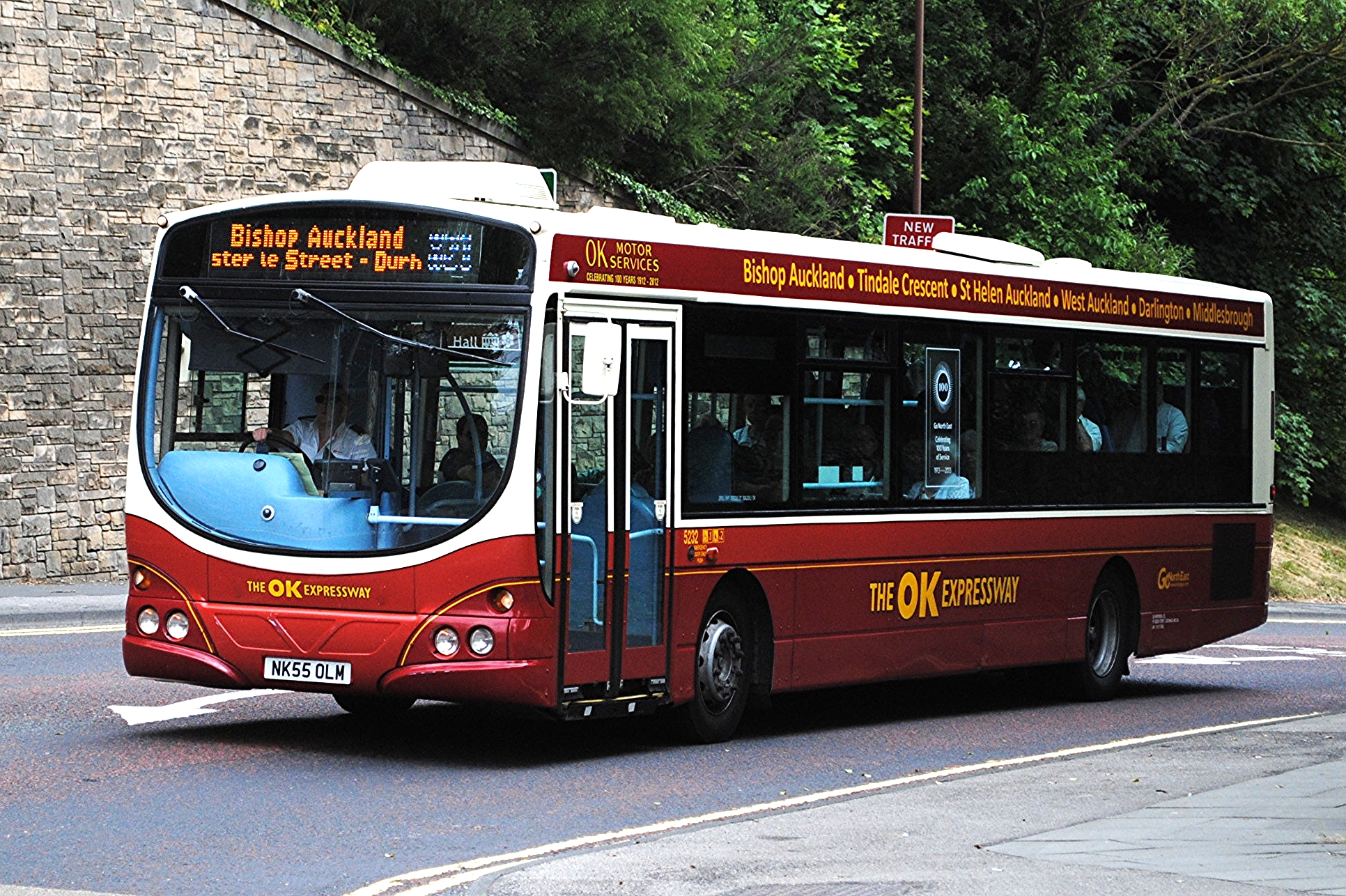
A Go North East Scania L94UB/Wright Solar branded in The OK Expressway livery.

On 23 January 2012, the OK Motor Services brand was briefly revived by Go North East, following the introduction of new services OK Way 18, which ran between Coundon and Tindale Crescent, and OK Expressway OK1, which ran between Crook, Bishop Auckland and Darlington. (Note: The OK Expressway OK1 was later extended to Middlesbrough, with services between Crook and Bishop Auckland reduced.)

On 10 August 2013, Go North East withdrew service OK1, as a result of a fall in passenger numbers towards the end of its 18-month trial. Service 18 was withdrawn in May 2019, with the route subsequently covered by an extension of service X21 from Newcastle, Chester-le-Street and Durham.

=== Preservation ===
In November 2007, a new OK Motor Services Ltd was formed at Companies House. The company remained dormant under the original owner but was acquired on 21 October 2014 by Tim Phillips, who had also previously formed a new OK Travel Ltd on 30 October 2012, under a different company number. Tim Phillips had acquired for restoration a Leyland Tiger (LFT 5X), originally purchased by OK Motor Services, with the company awarded an operator's licence on 25 May 2016.

== Operations ==
=== Depots ===
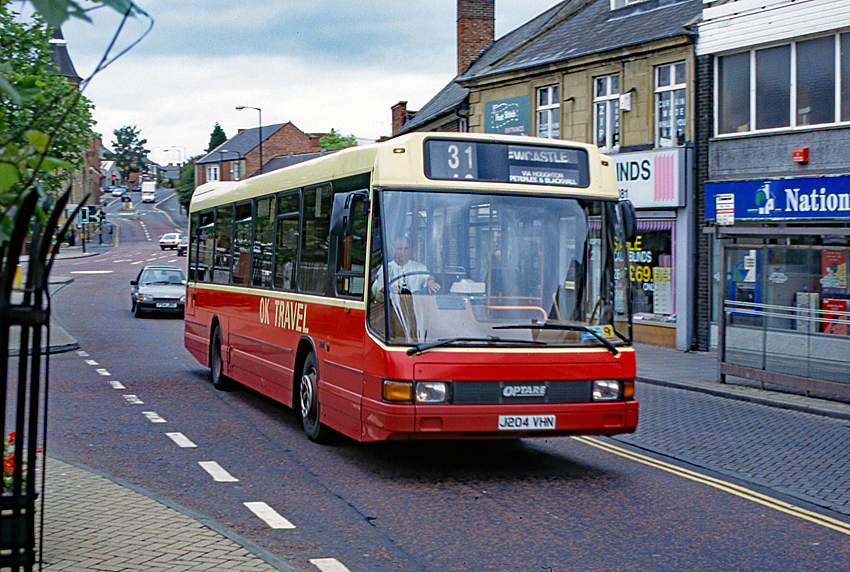
DAF Optare on route 31 in Chester-le-Street in 1996

The company formerly operated from the following depots across the region: Bishop Auckland, (Note: Passed to Go North East, and subsequently closed in March 2006, with flagship services transferred to Chester-le-Street.) Heaton, Peterlee, Shotton Colliery (Note: Formally owned by F Lockey and Sons. The depot closed in 1989 when the new depot was opened in Peterlee.) and Team Valley.

=== Fleet ===
By 1994, the company operated 212 vehicles, with an average fleet age of about 11 years. In the preceding year, the company had bought a total of 47 brand-new vehicles.
