= Wright Solar =

Low-floor single-deck bus body

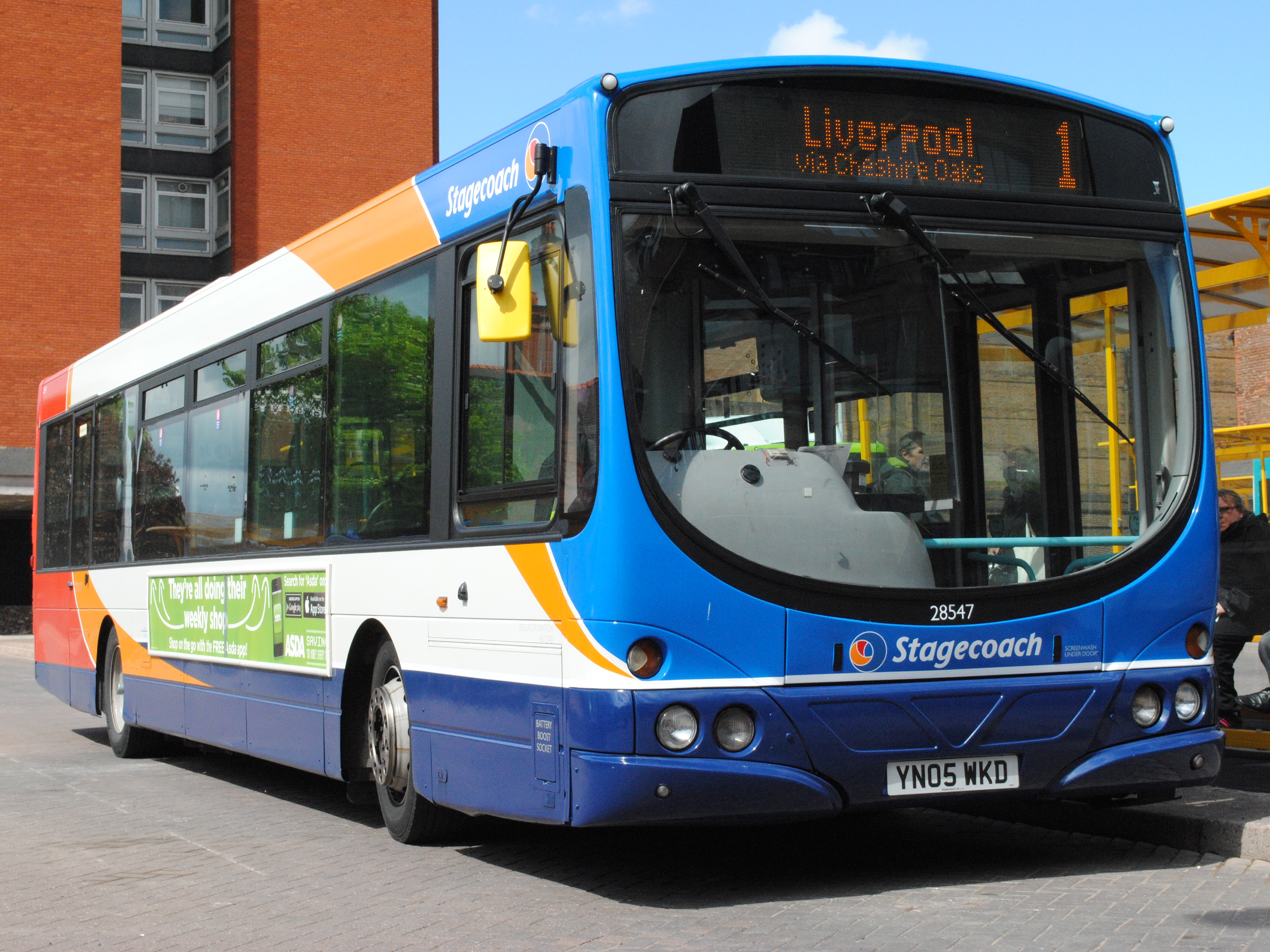
- Stagecoach Merseyside Wright Solar bodied Scania L94UB in Chester in May 2013

Overview
- Manufacturer: Wrightbus
- Production: 2000–2011
- Assembly: Ballymena, Northern Ireland
- Designer: Paul Blair; Trevor Erskine

Body and chassis
- Doors: 1 or 2
- Floor type: Low entry
- Chassis: Scania L94UB; Scania K230UB
- Related: Wright Solar Fusion; Wright Eclipse

Powertrain
- Engine: Scania DC901/DC904
- Capacity: 74 (46 seated, 28 standing)
- Transmission: ZF Friedrichshafen

Dimensions
- Length: 11.95 metres (39.2 ft)
- Width: 2.50 metres (8 ft 2 in)
- Height: 3.00 metres (9.84 ft)

Chronology
- Predecessor: Wright Axcess-Floline

The Wright Solar is a low entry single-decker bus body that was built on Scania L94UB and Scania K230UB chassis by Wrightbus between 2000 and 2011. The Wright Solar Fusion is an articulated version.

== Design ==
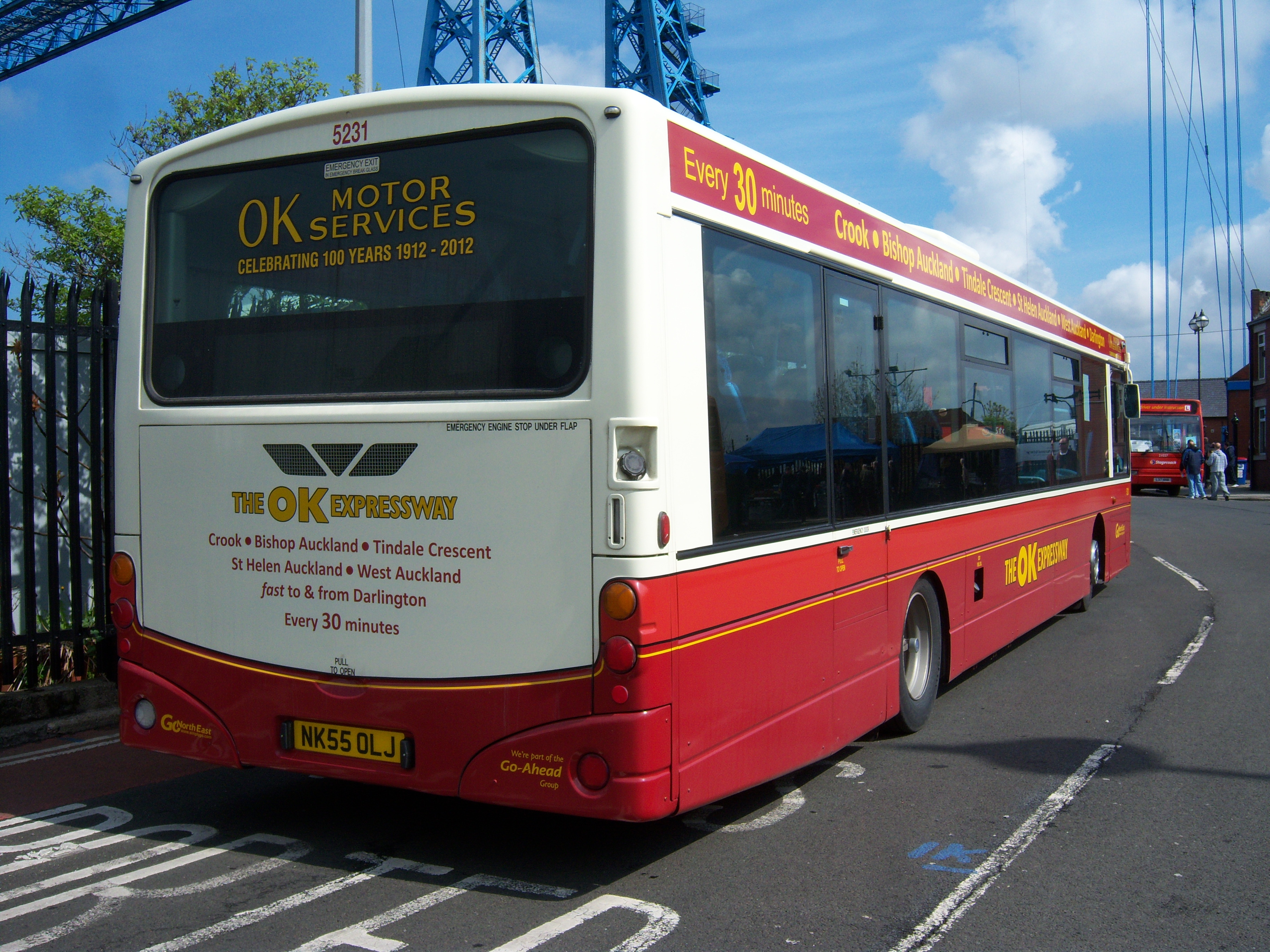
Rear view of Go North East Wright Solar bodied Scania L94UB in April 2012

First launched at the Coach & Bus '99 expo on the Scania L94UB chassis alongside the Wright Eclipse and later tested for 22 weeks at the Millbrook Proving Ground, the Wright Solar was jointly the first Wrightbus product to make use of a new rounded 'Millennium City Bus' design concept introduced by designers Paul Blair and Trevor Erskine. The Solar featured a new distinctive front fascia with curved front and rear Protech polypropylene and glassfibre composite panels, intended to retain their shape upon impact, and a one-piece semicircular windscreen.

The Solar body was assembled using Wrightbus' 'Aluminique' bolted aluminium frame, a successor to the Alusuisse system used on previous Wright products. Internally, the bus featured the 'Floline' sloped floor system, removing the need for multiple steps towards the rear of the interior, alongside a 320 millimetres (13 in) entrance step that was capable of lowering to 200 millimetres (7.9 in) through the suspension's 'kneeling' capability; these features were duplicated on the Eclipse and other related single-deck Wrightbus products. Options for gasket window glazing instead of standard bonded glazing, as well as the addition of a centre exit door, were additionally offered.

=== Solar Rural ===
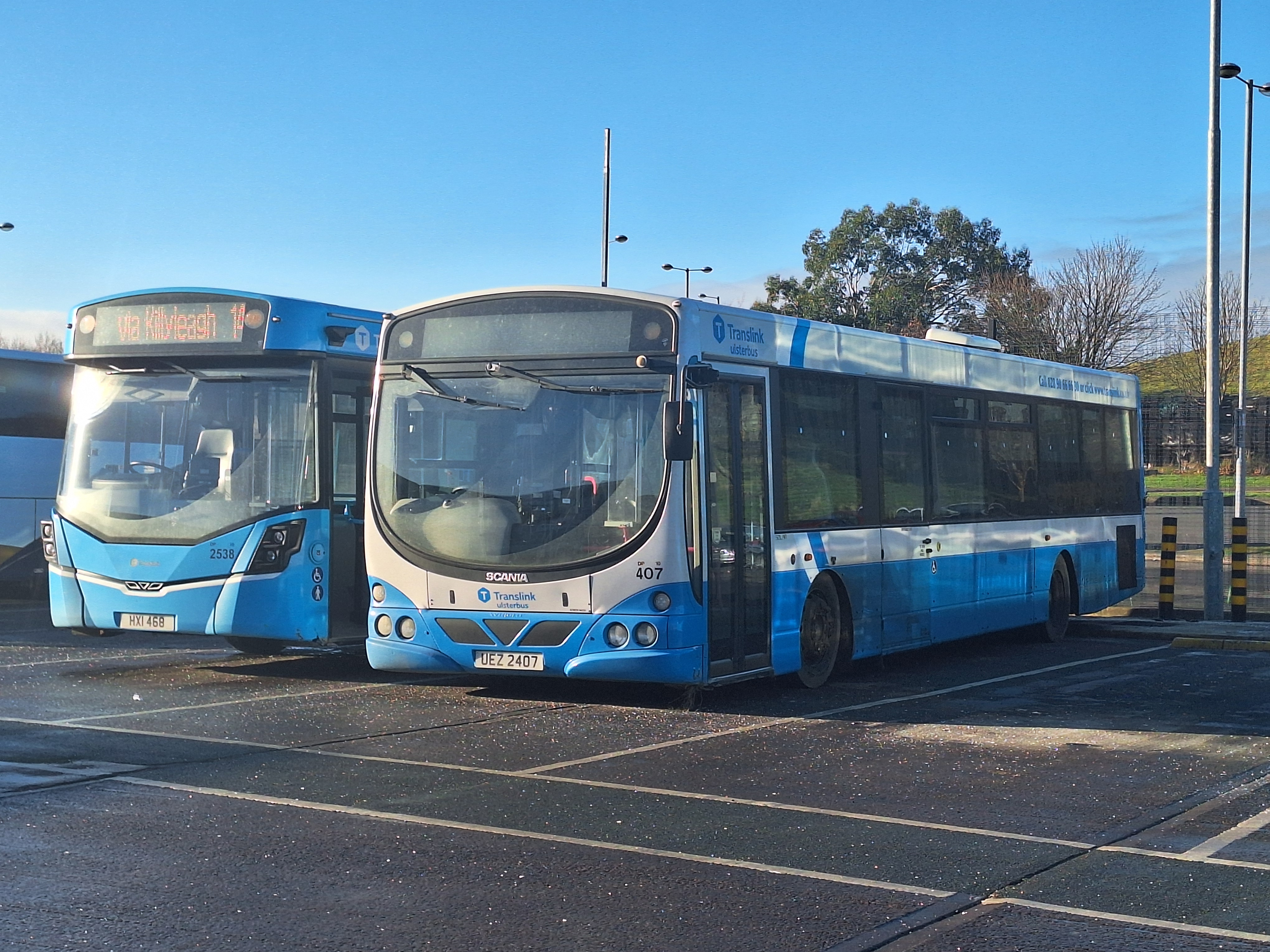
Ulsterbus Wright Solar Rural bodied Scania K230UB at Downpatrick bus station in January 2024

In 2008, in co-operation with Translink, Wrightbus launched the Solar Rural on Scania K230UB chassis, designed for use by Ulsterbus on rural bus services across Northern Ireland. Compared to the standard Solar, these buses were built with a separate hinged wheelchair entry door providing direct access to the wheelchair bay, allowing for a smaller front entrance to be provided, and was upseated to have two-plus-two seating at the front and two-plus-three seating at the rear, with all seats equipped with seatbelts to allow the Solar Rural to be used as a school bus.

== Operators ==
The first two Wright Solars were delivered as demonstrator units, with one delivered to FirstGroup specification for service with First Glasgow and the other delivered to Translink for use by Ulsterbus. Translink were ultimately the largest operator of the Solar, purchasing a total of 198 on Scania L94UB chassis, as well as being the exclusive operator of all 122 Wright Solar Rurals, while Go North East purchased 80 Solars and Trentbarton purchased 92.
