= Blackpool Transport =

Bus and tram operator in Blackpool, England

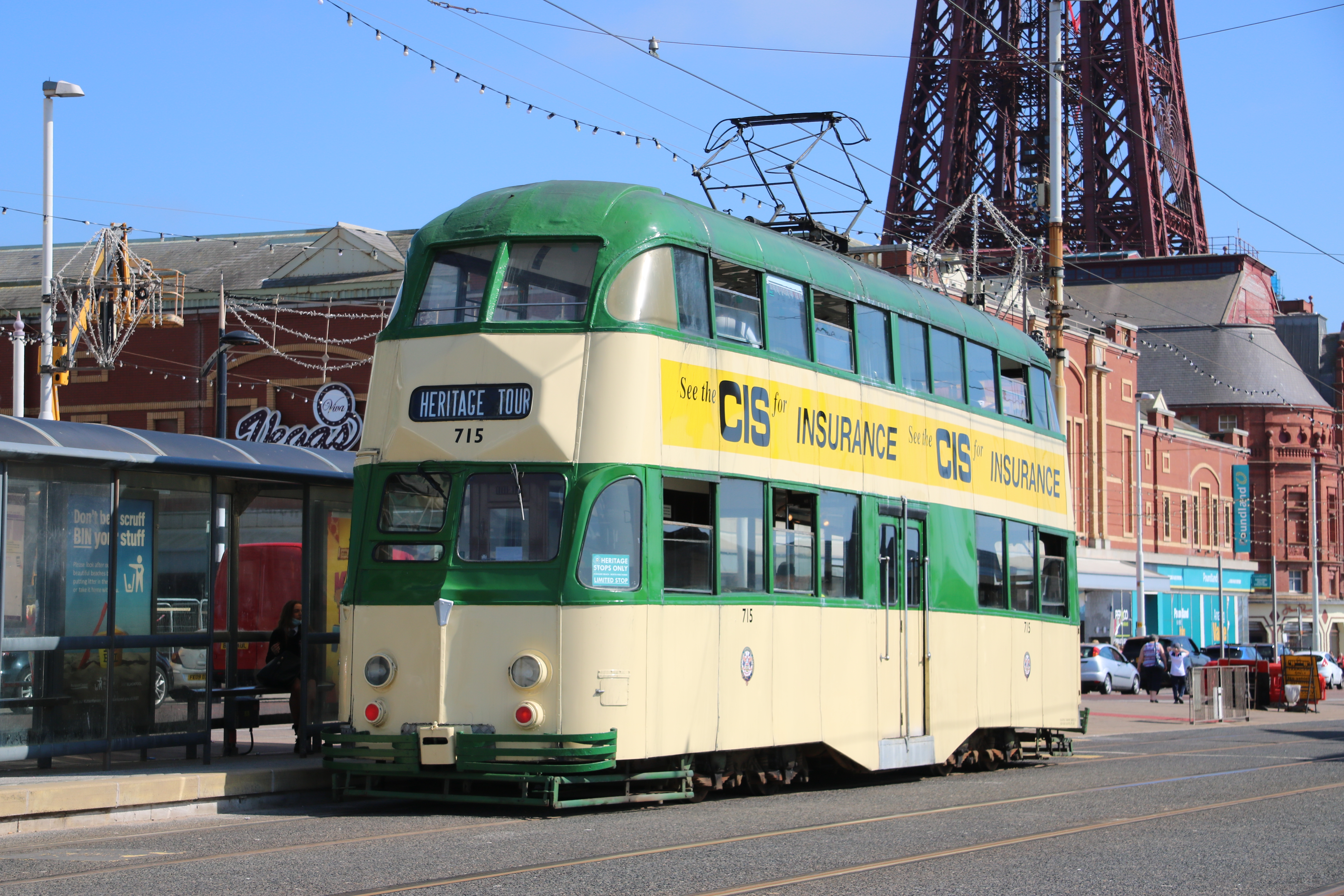
- English Electric Balloon tram at North Pier in July 2021
- Parent: Blackpool Borough Council
- Founded: 1885 (141 years ago)
- Headquarters: Rigby Road, Blackpool
- Service area: The Fylde Coast, Lancashire
- Service type: Tram and bus
- Destinations: Fleetwood, Lytham St Annes, Knott End, Poulton-le-Fylde
- Depots: Starr Gate (Flexity 2 Trams); Rigby Road (Bus and Heritage Trams)
- Fleet: 98 buses 25 trams Various heritage trams
- Chief executive: Lea Harrison
- Website: www.blackpooltransport.com

Blackpool Transport Services Limited is a bus and tram operator running within the boroughs of Blackpool and Fylde and into the surrounding area, including Fleetwood, Lytham St Annes, Poulton-le-Fylde, Cleveleys, Fleetwood. Blackpool Transport is owned by Blackpool Council.

== History ==
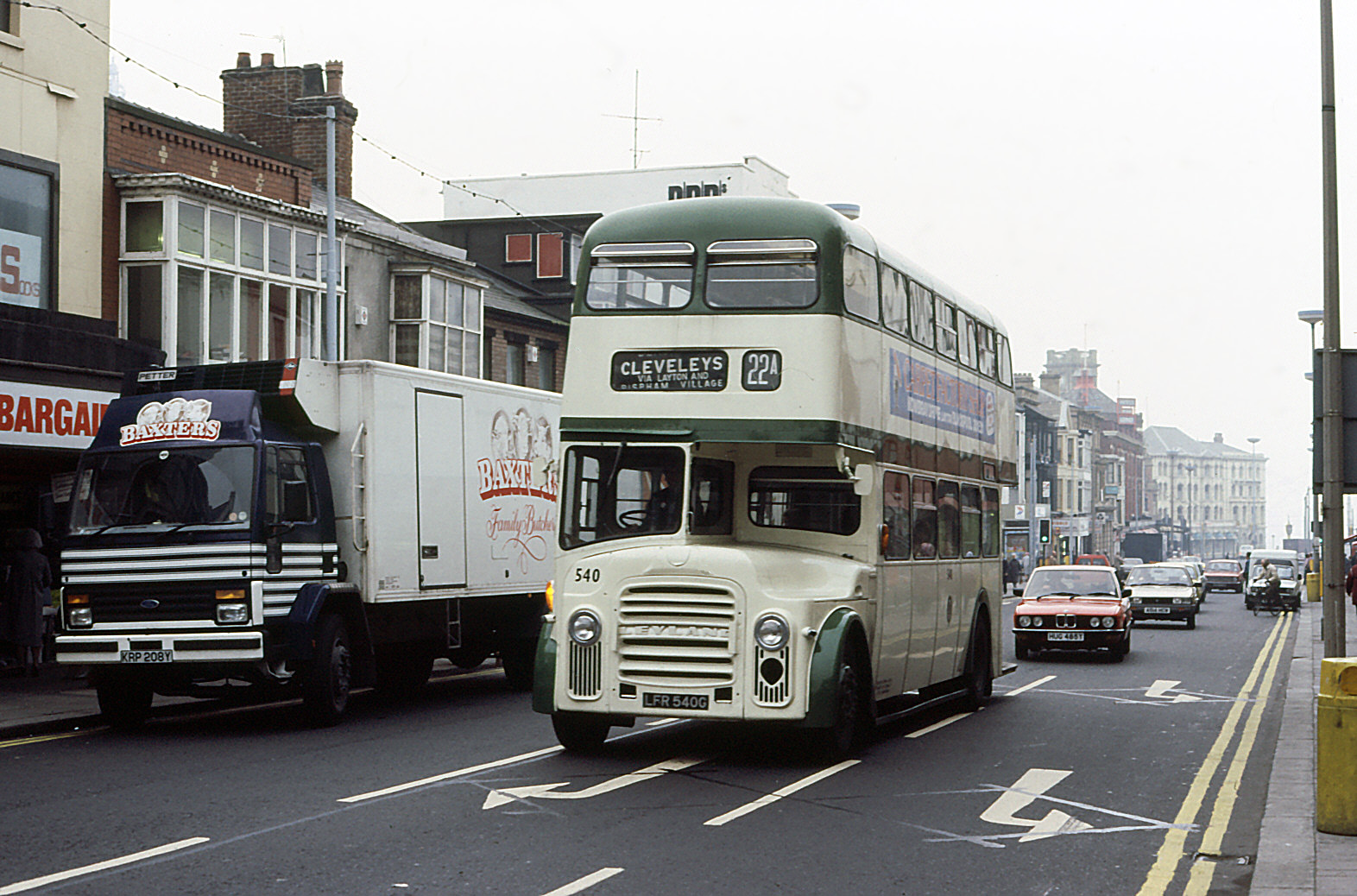
Metro Cammell bodied Leyland Titan on Talbot Road in November 1983

Blackpool Transport was founded in 1885 by the town council. The tramway opened on 29 September 1885 using a conduit system to operate the trams using electricity. However, due to difficulties with this method of operation, 550V overhead wiring was installed over the tracks in 1899 to replace the conduit system. On 2 July 1921, Blackpool Transport's first motorbus service commenced, with two Tilling-Stevens petrol-electric single-deck buses purchased to run a service between Cleveleys and Thornton railway station, while the first route to operate wholly within the borough of Blackpool commenced in December 1922, running between Adelaide Place and Devonshire Road.

To comply with the Transport Act 1985, the assets of Blackpool Transport were transferred to a new legal entity, Blackpool Transport Services Limited. Neighbouring operator Fylde Borough Transport, which at the time traded as Blue Buses, was taken over in 1994; it had previously been a council-owned operation itself, but spent five months in private ownership before Blackpool Transport's takeover.

Metro Coastlines logo

The company's network was relaunched in April 2001 under the name Metro Coastlines. Along with the new name came a new colour-coded service: each core bus route was operated by vehicles painted in a livery heavily featuring that route's colour. There were twelve such routes, and the historic tramway along the promenade also had its own variation of the livery.

On 26 July 2010, Metro Coastlines branding was discontinued and the company resumed trading as Blackpool Transport. Buses had their Metro Coastlines logos removed and replaced with a new tower and waves logo, along with a black and yellow colour scheme. The tramway now uses a purple and white colour scheme, introduced in 2012 and based on Blackpool Council's main colour schemes. The tower and waves logo does not feature on the Bombardier Flexity 2 trams but is featured at the top of the central doors on the modernised English Electric Balloon trams.

== Operations ==
Blackpool Transport has three offices from which daily operations are run. Rigby Road is the registered headquarters for the company and is where all buses and heritage trams are kept and maintained. The depot contains a bus engineering shed, heritage engineering shed and fitting and paint shops onsite. In May 2024, Blackpool Transport announced it was seeking contractors to work on refurbishing one of the older buildings at Rigby Road, with plans to fit chargers to support a future intake of between 90 and 115 battery electric buses funded by a £20 million Zero Emission Bus Regional Areas (ZEBRA) grant.

Blackpool Transport's trams are stored, maintained and operated from the Starr Gate depot on the promenade. This building houses all the "new" fleet Bombardier Flexity2 trams with a dedicated engineering bay.

For a short while, Blackpool Transport also operated a travel shop on Market Street in Blackpool. This was designed to house a customer-service team, although it was abandoned due to the COVID-19 pandemic. Blackpool Transport still use this property, but it is now closed to the public.

=== Bus fleet ===
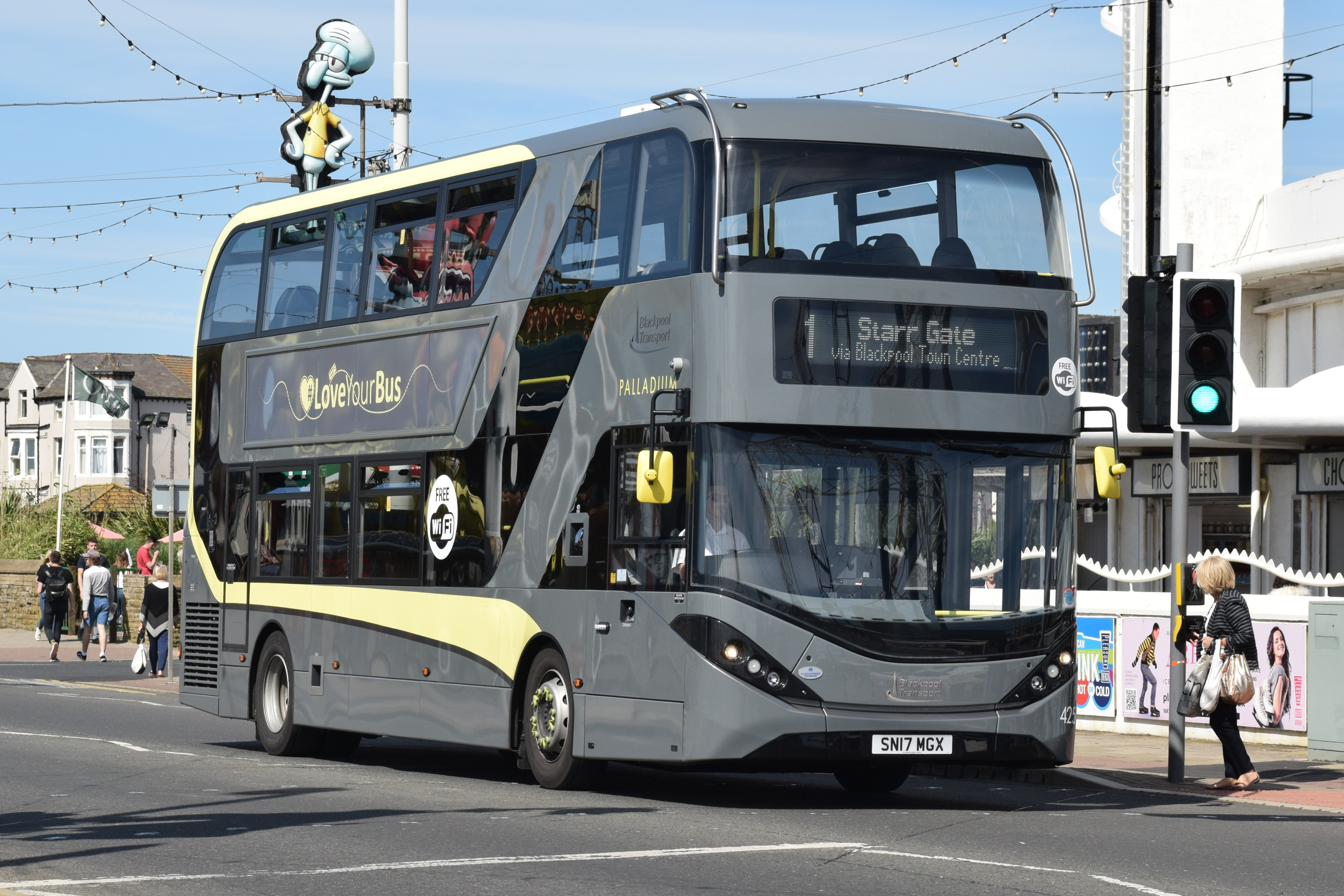
'Palladium' branded Alexander Dennis Enviro400 City at Pleasure Beach in July 2017

As of October 2025, the Blackpool Transport bus fleet consisted of 98 active vehicles.

Between 1933 and 2001, the bus fleet's livery was green and cream, with different arrangements of the two colours decade after decade. This livery was discontinued in 2001 with the introduction of the Metro Coastlines brand, which also saw each bus stop and route timetable being colour-coded. The Metro Coastlines brand was later replaced in 2010 with a new black-and-yellow livery, replacing all of the route-branded liveries.

==== Palladium ====
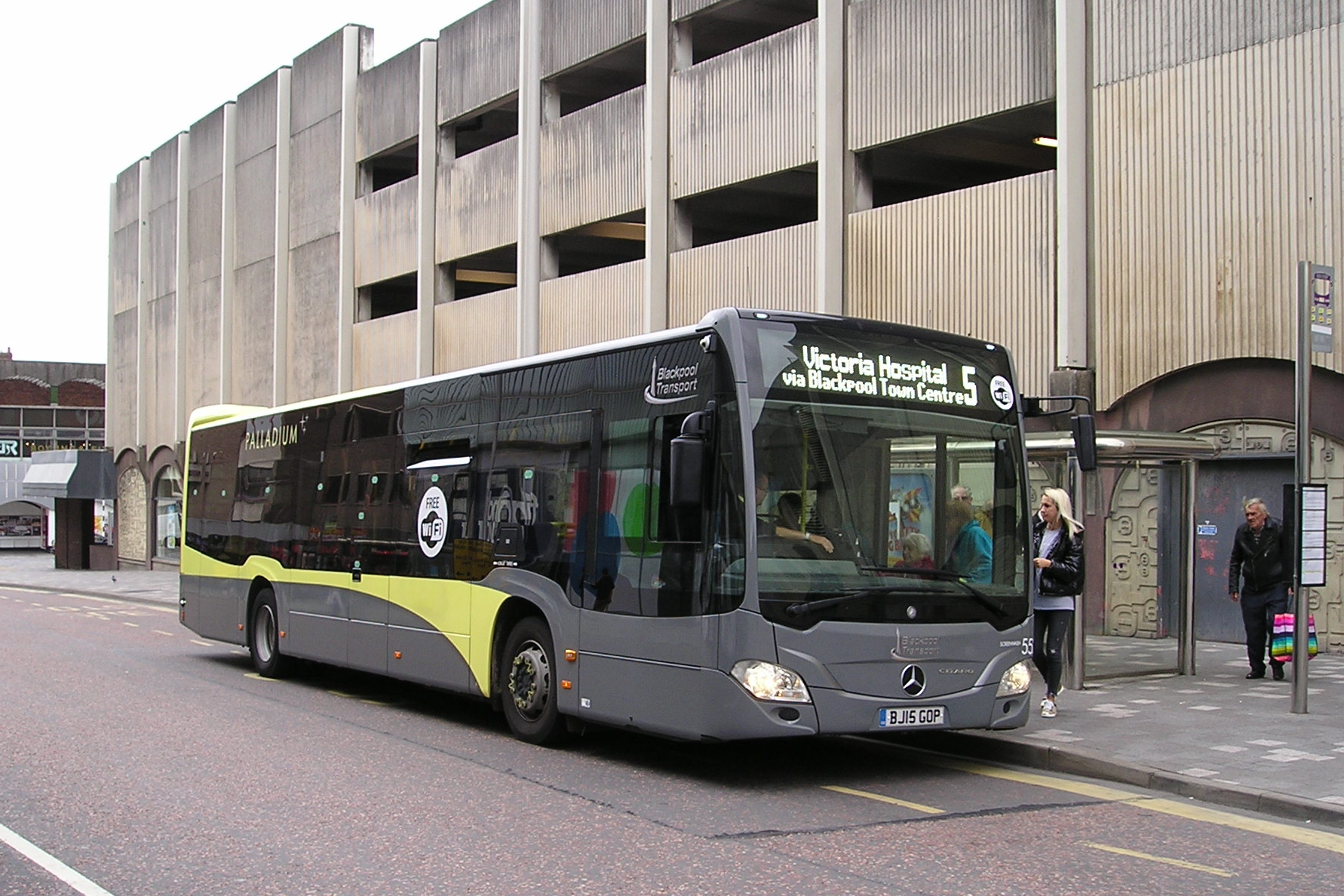
'Palladium' branded Mercedes-Benz Citaro C2 on Springfield Road in September 2018

In May 2015, Blackpool Transport unveiled the new 'Palladium' premium brand on its bus network. All vehicles with Palladium specification are fitted with Wi-Fi, e-Leather seating, wood-effect flooring and a grey-and-yellow livery, designed by public transport marketing specialist JR Buzz. The first route to be upgraded was the 5, which received a batch of new Mercedes-Benz Citaro C2s.

The 7 and 9/9A were upgraded to Palladium buses in 2016, with the latter receiving a batch of new Alexander Dennis Enviro400 Citys, the first of their type to enter service outside of London. Other routes which have been upgraded to Palladium standard are services 6, 9, 11 and 14, with a mix of refurbished and new high-specification Enviro400 City and Enviro200 MMC vehicles. These deliveries coincided with a five-year plan to renew the majority of the fleet, with the aim of no vehicle in the fleet being older than five years by the beginning of 2020.

By 2019, the entire Blackpool Transport bus fleet had adopted the Palladium branding.

=== Tram fleet ===
Blackpool Transport also operates the Blackpool Tramway, which currently has a varied fleet of eighteen modern Bombardier Flexity 2 articulated low floor trams, and nine modernised 1930s double-deck English Electric Balloon cars. The assortment of various heritage trams were suspended in December 2024 due to operational difficulties relating to their age.

== Gallery ==
=== Buses ===
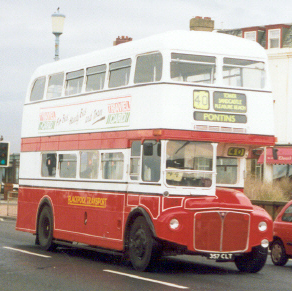
AEC Routemaster in April 1994

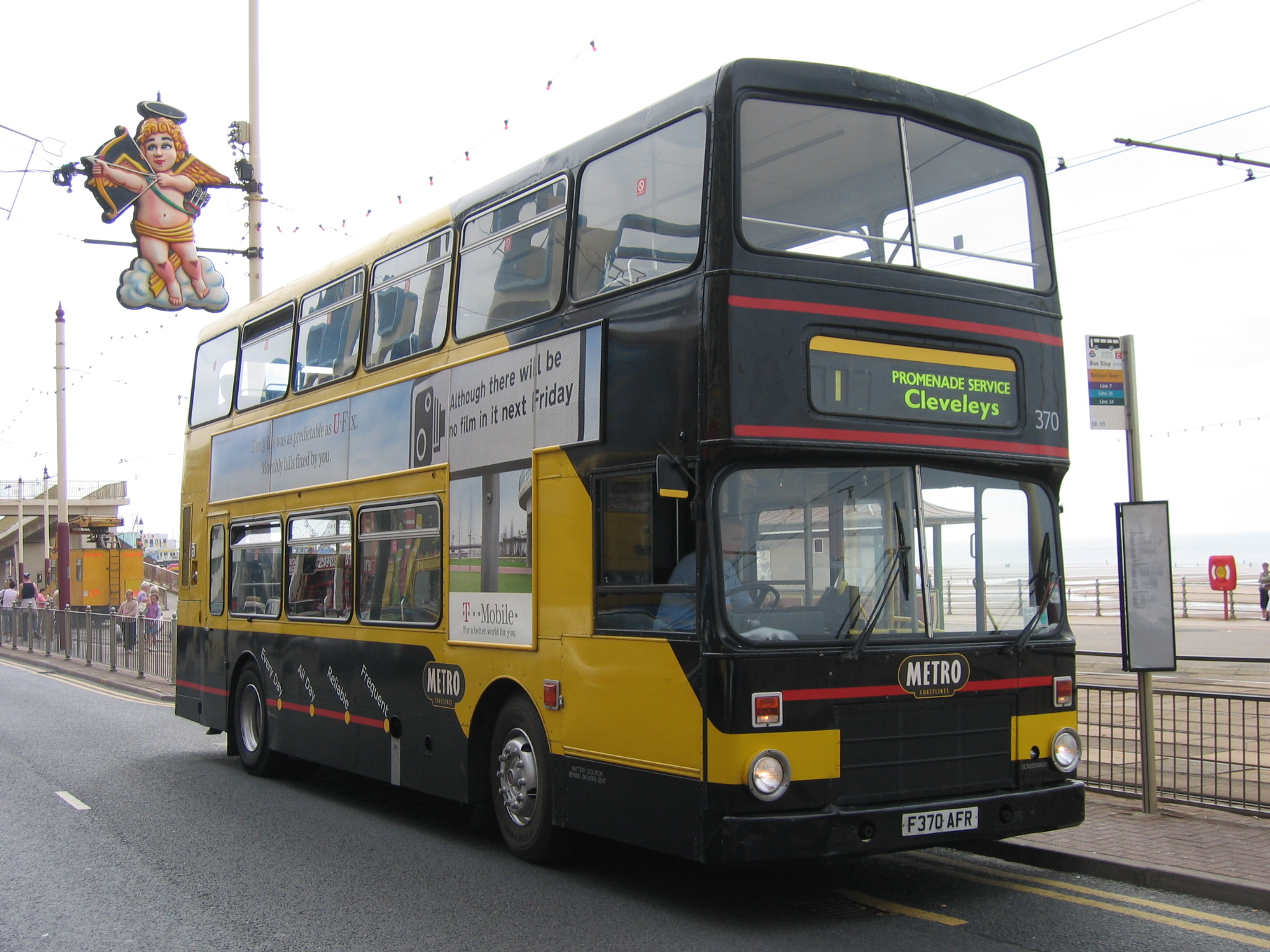
Metro Coastlines-branded East Lancs bodied Leyland Olympian on the Promenade in August 2005

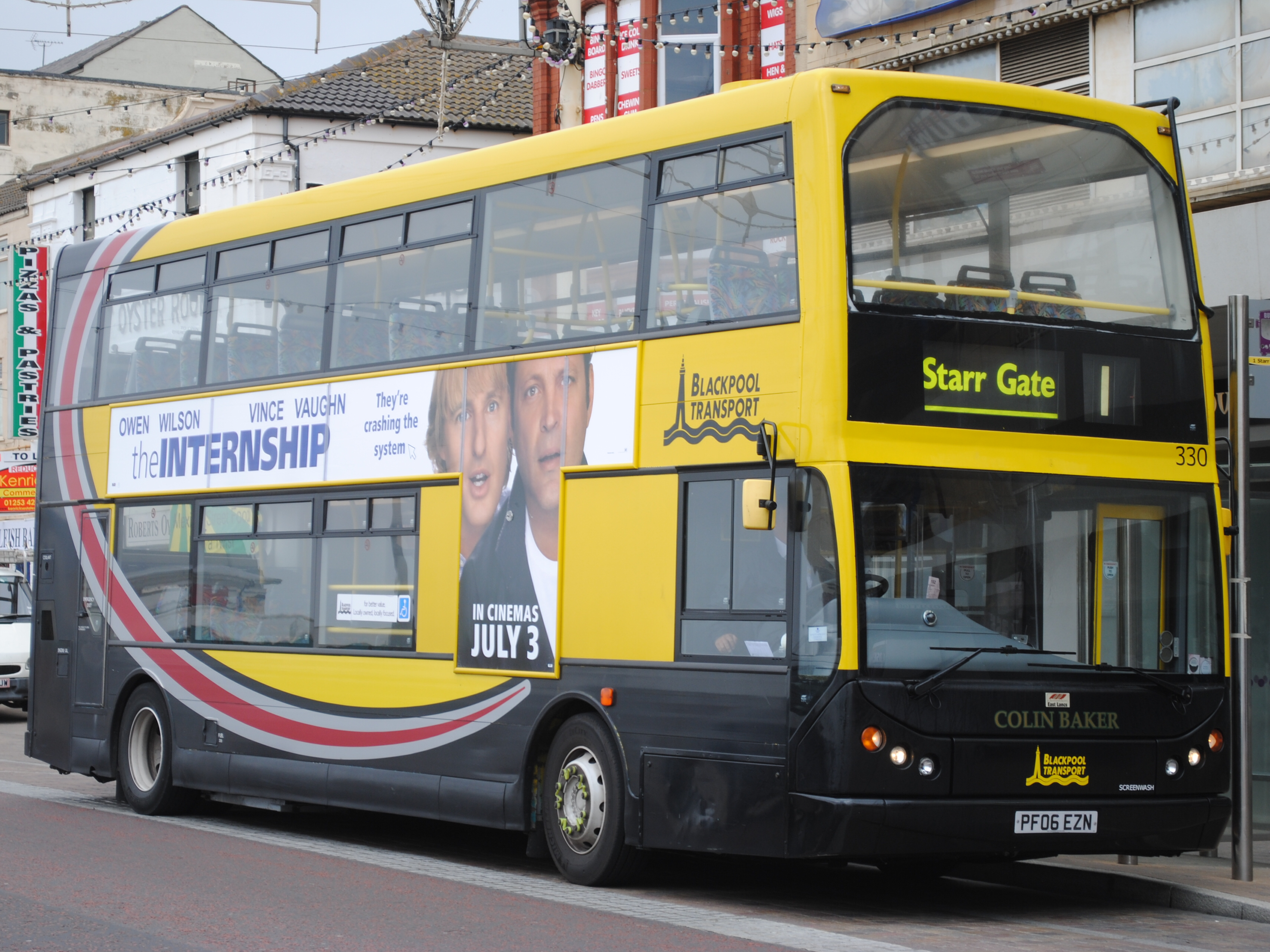
East Lancs Myllennium Lolyne-bodied Dennis Trident on the Promenade in June 2013

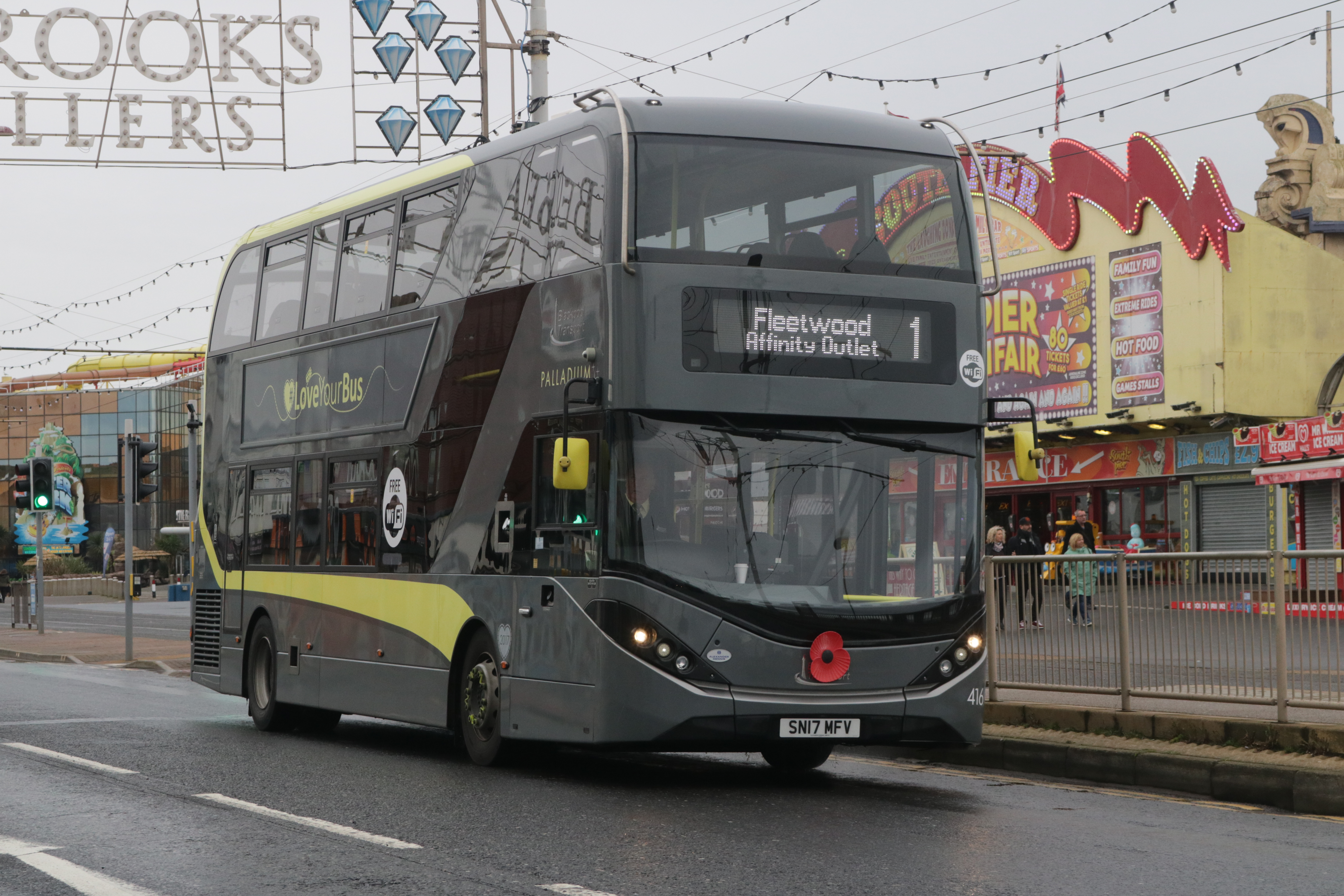
Enviro400 City in Blackpool town centre in November 2019.

=== Trams ===
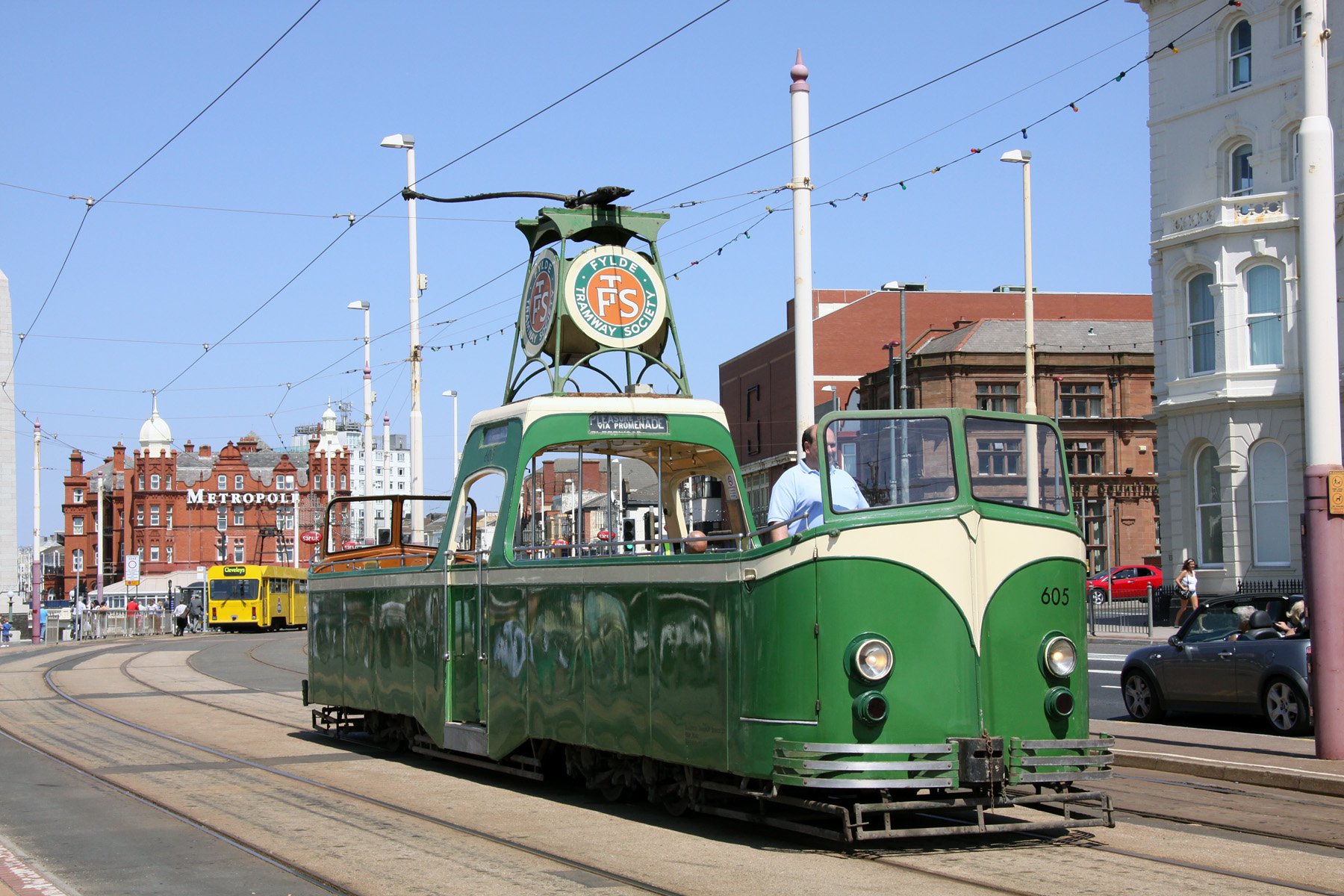
Open-boat tram No. 605 in Blackpool in May 2009

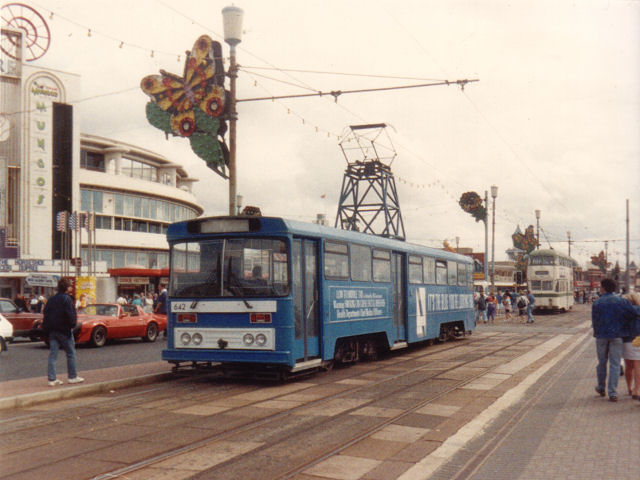
Centenary tram No. 642 at the Pleasure Beach in August 1990

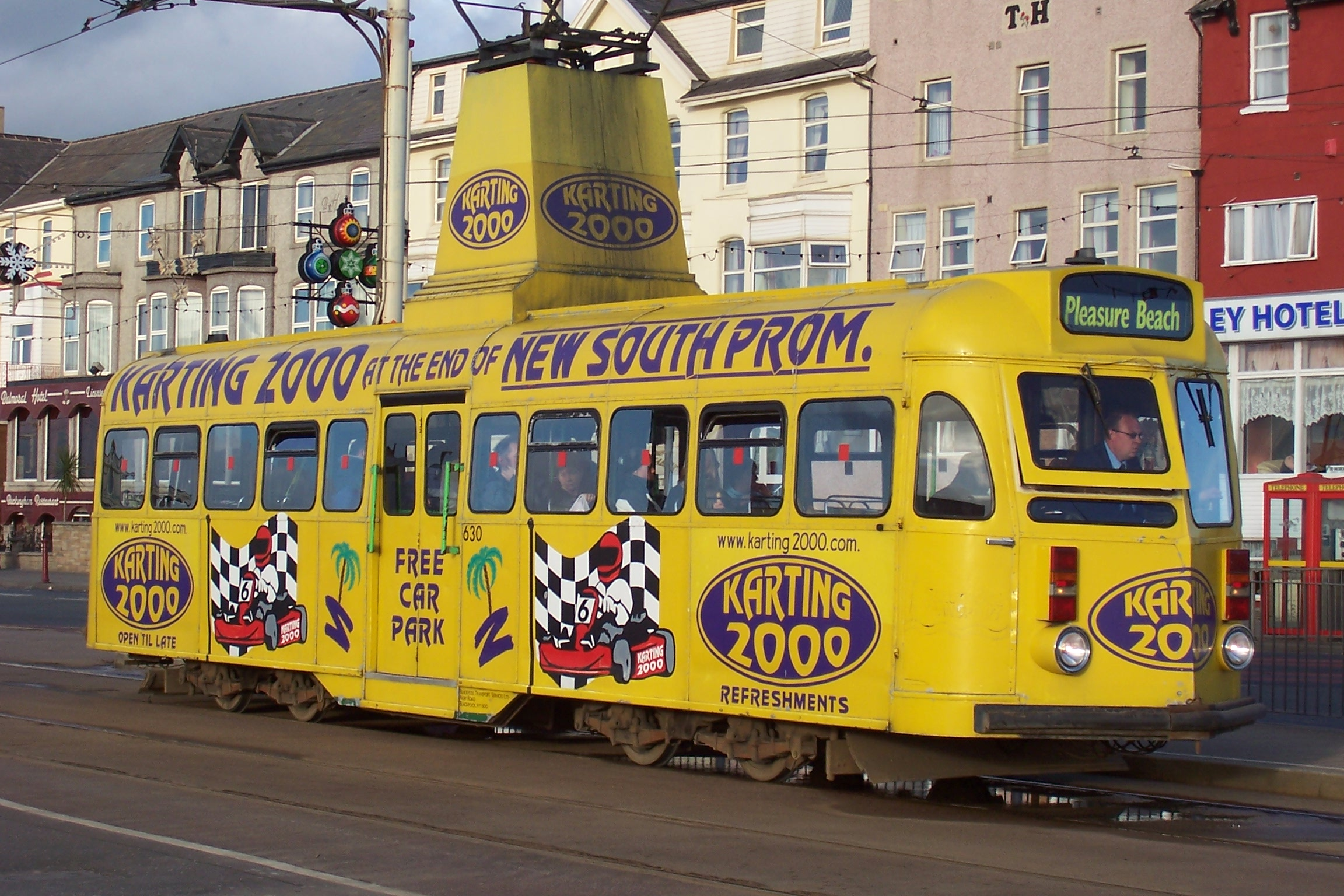
Brush Railcoach tram No. 630 in Blackpool in October 2005

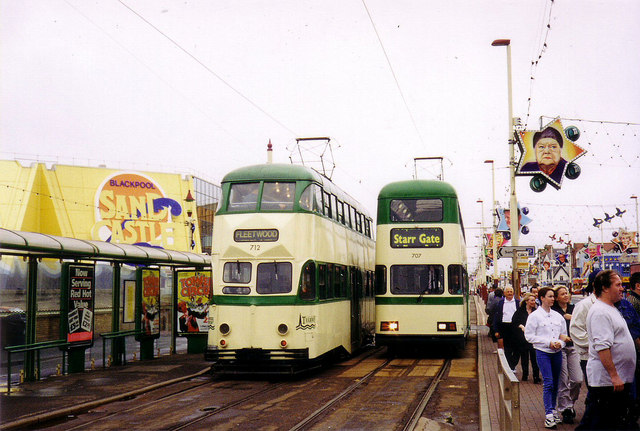
English Electric Balloon tram No. 712 and Millennium tram No. 707 at Sandcastle Water Park in July 1998

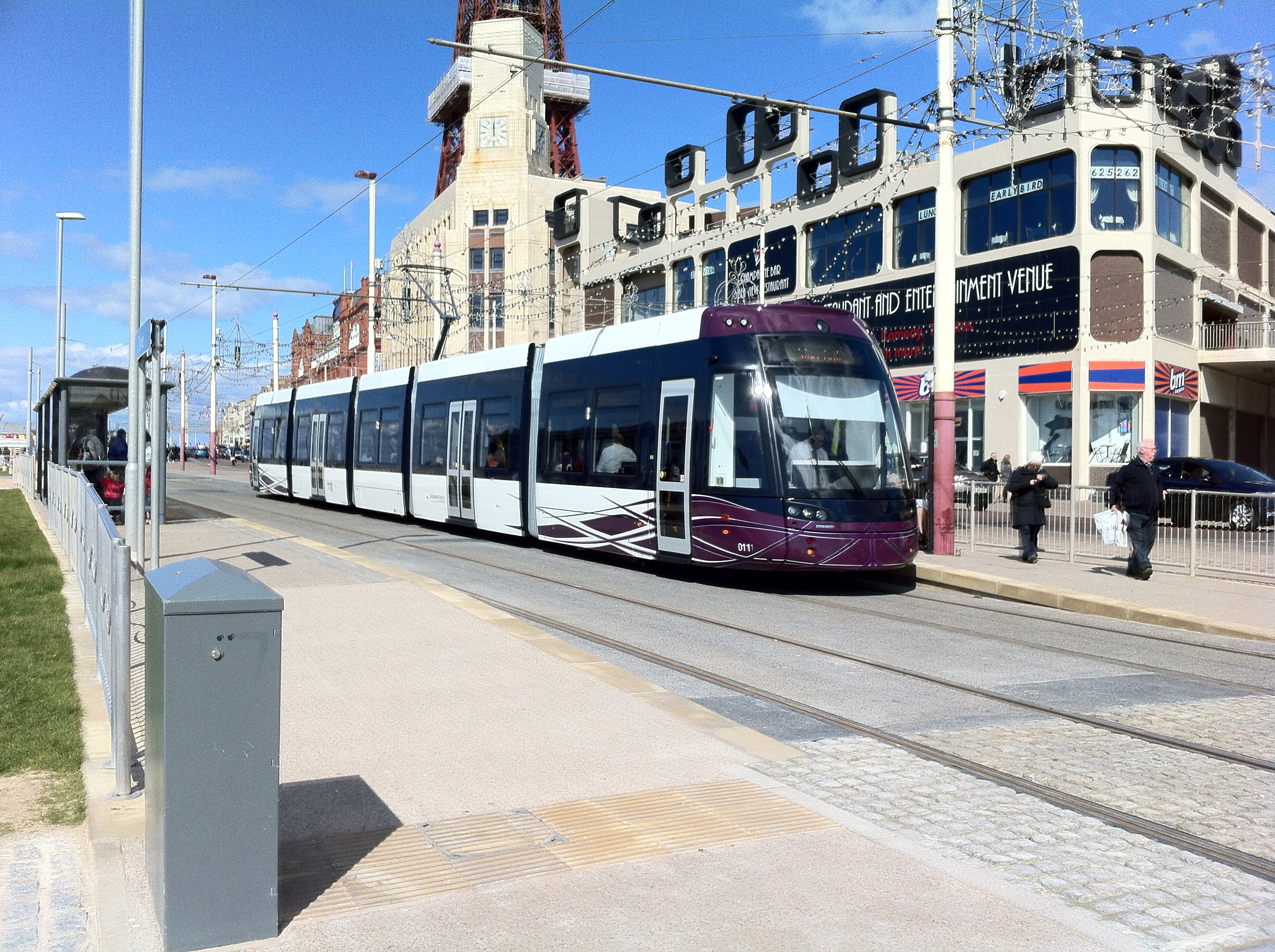
Flexity 2 tram at tower tram stop going to Starr Gate.

== See also ==
- Public transport in the Fylde
