= Trentbarton =

Bus operator in the East Midlands of England

trentbarton

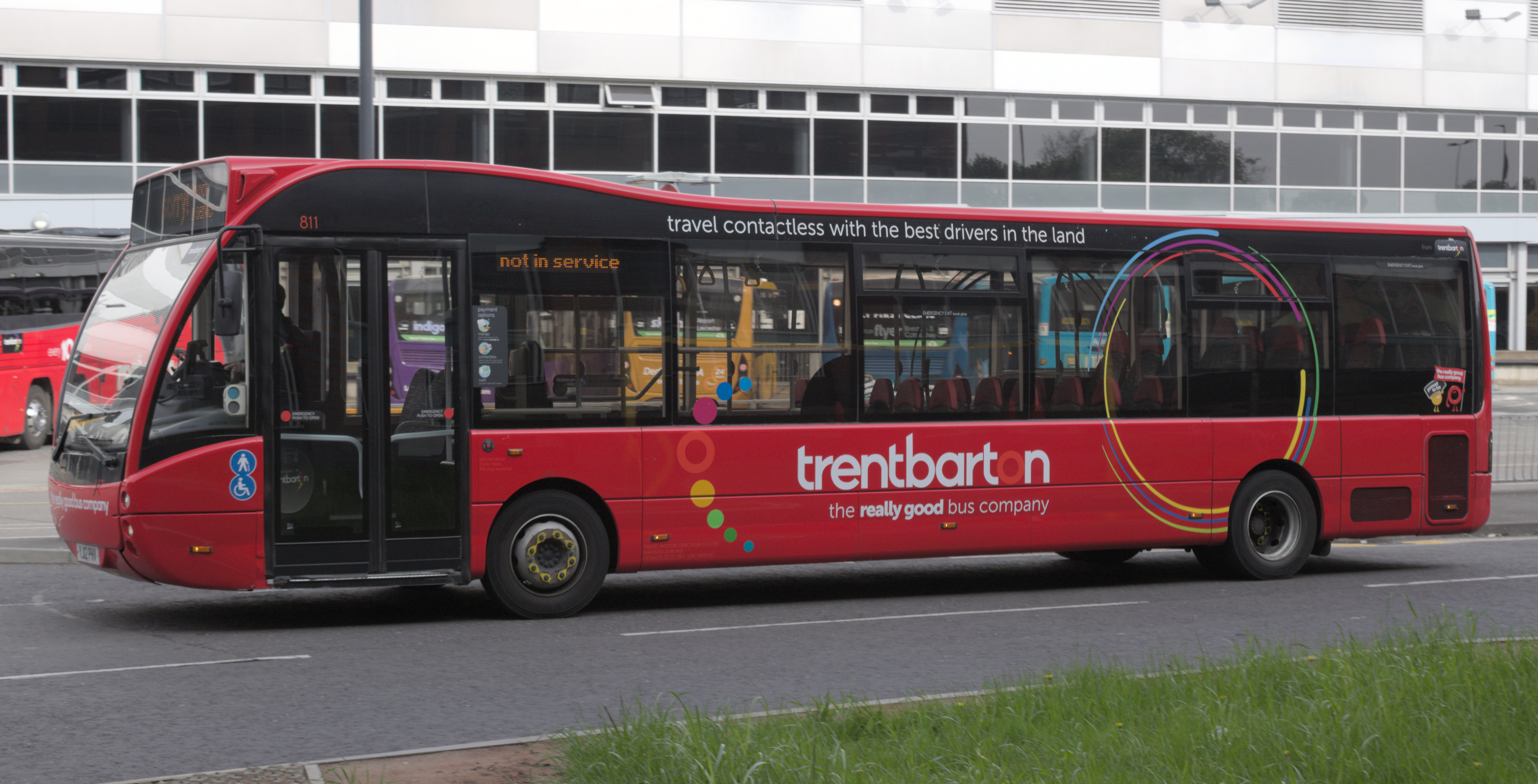
- An Optare Versa with generic trentbarton branding at Derby bus station in April 2025
- Parent: Wellglade Group
- Founded: October 1913; 113 years ago
- Headquarters: Heanor, Derbyshire; England
- Service area: Derbyshire; Leicestershire; Nottinghamshire; Staffordshire
- Service type: Bus and coach
- Routes: 43 (June 2024)
- Depots: 5
- Fleet: 247 (June 2024)
- Managing Director: Tom Morgan
- Website: www.trentbarton.co.uk

trentbarton (stylised in all lowercase) is a bus operator in the Nottinghamshire, Derbyshire, Leicestershire, and Staffordshire regions. Trentbarton is part of the Wellglade Group.

== History ==
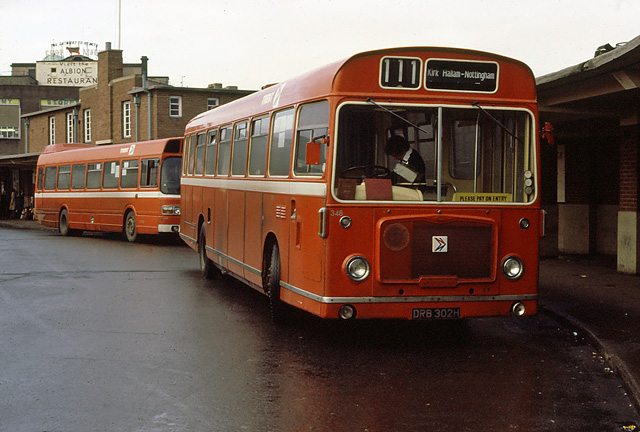
NBC Trent buses at Derby bus station in 1980

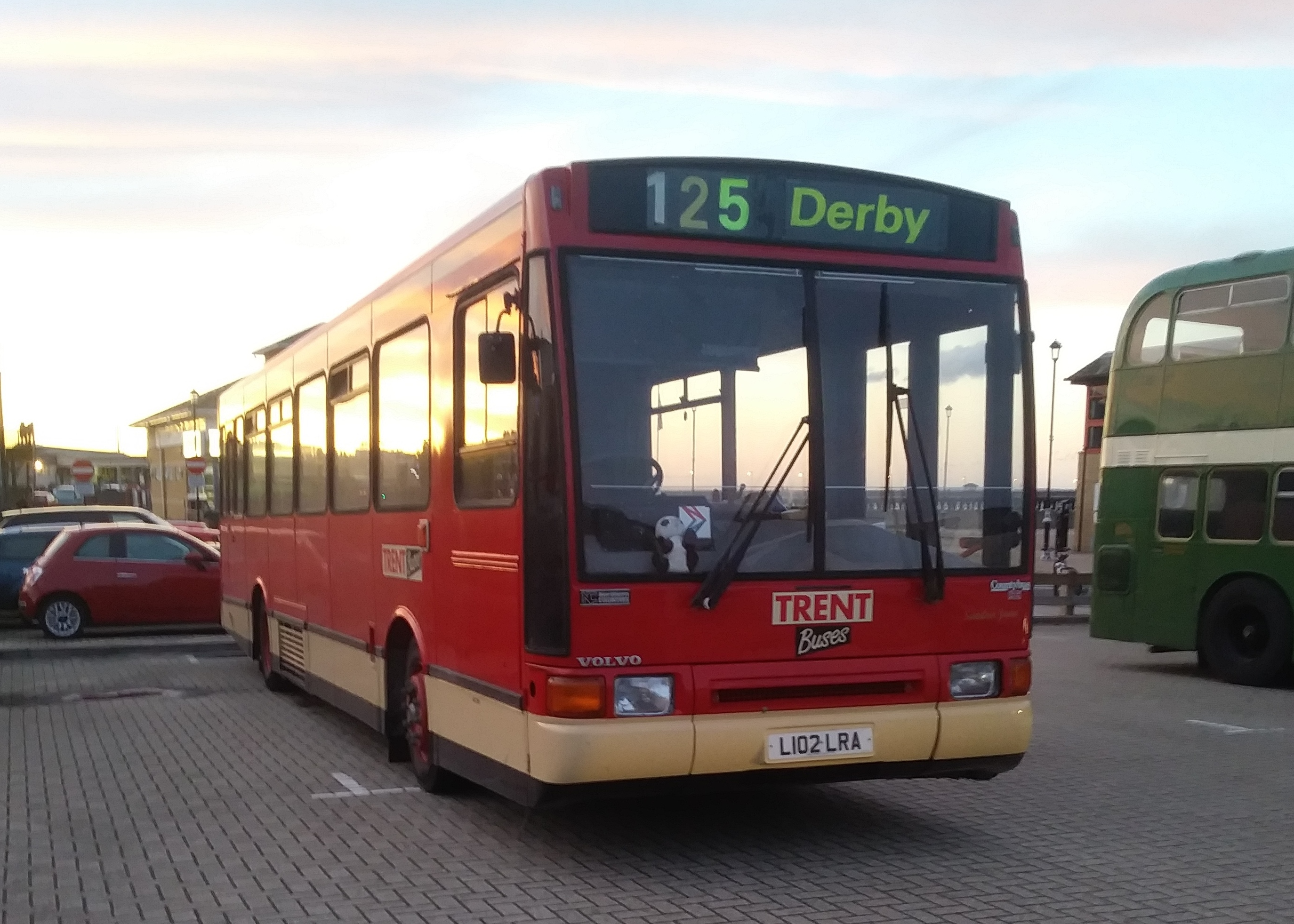
Preserved Trent Buses Northern Counties Paladin bodied Volvo B10B in October 2019

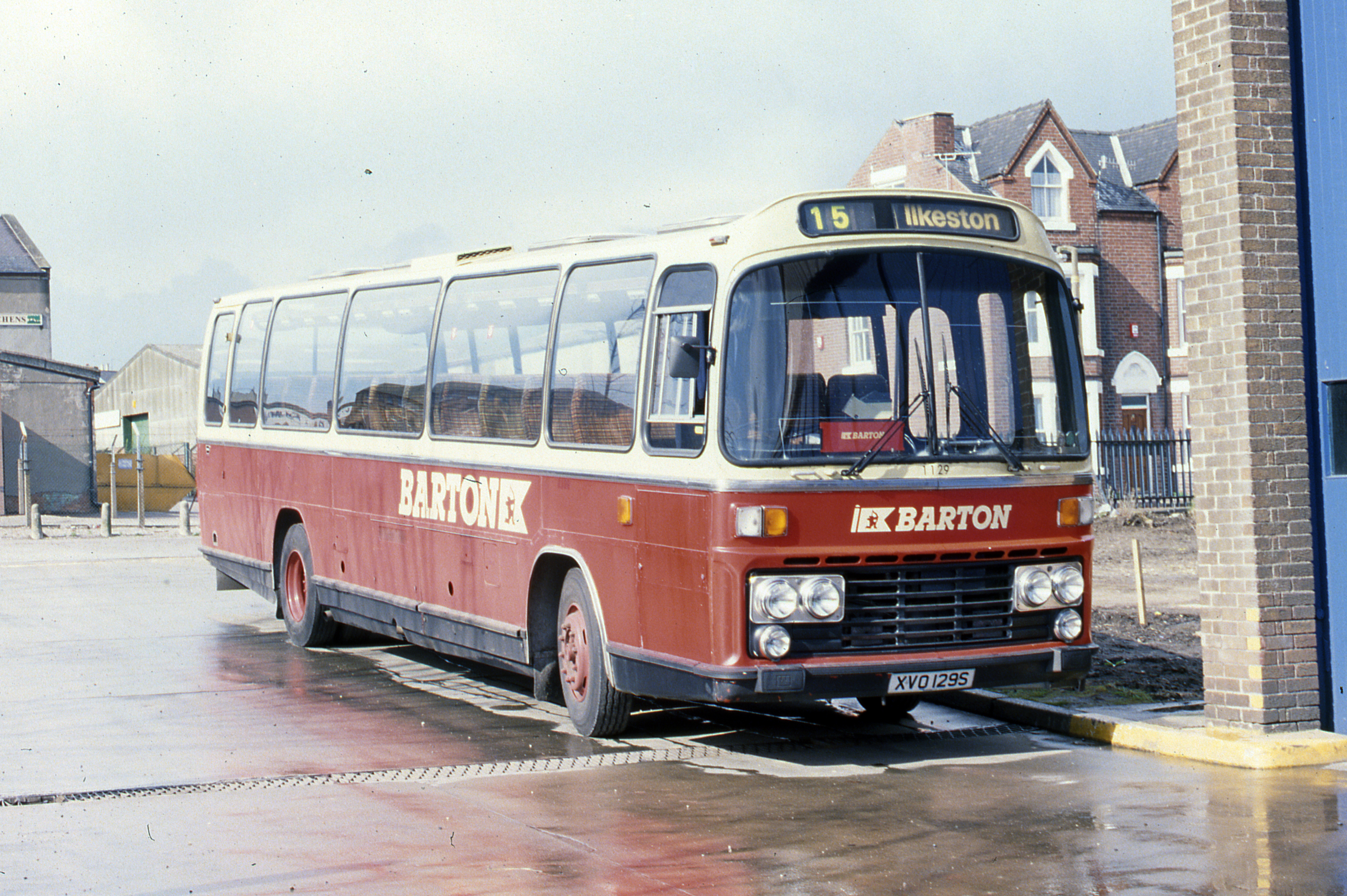
Barton Buses Plaxton Supreme bodied Leyland Leopard in 1993

In October 1913, the Trent Motor Traction Company was founded, commencing operations with a bus service between Ashbourne and Derby. A second service between Derby and Stapleford was introduced the following month. The Trent Motor Traction Company's buses were originally painted green; however, from 1923, the fleet colour was changed to red.

By 1925, a large network of services was operating from Derby, Loughborough and Nottingham; as services expanded, the Trent Motor Traction business grew, with a total of seven depots being established, with a total of 52 smaller operators subsequently acquired during the 1930s. Around this time, Trent Motor Traction standardised on buses manufactured by Midland Red, the last of which were delivered following the outbreak of the Second World War in 1940.

In August 1949, a co-ordination agreement was reached between the Trent Motor Traction Company and the Derby Corporation. A joint service operated by both Trent and Derby, running from the town to Cavendish via Corporation Avenue, was established, with return tickets purchasable for use on both operators' buses. This co-ordination scheme was maintained until the mid-1980s, being renewed in 1979 to split Derby's services to be operated 83.34% by Derby Transport, with the remaining 16.66% operated by Trent Motor Traction. Additionally in 1958, following the opening of the A52 road, Trent Motor Traction and neighbouring Barton Transport commenced operations of a joint express coach service between Derby and Nottingham.

In 1969, Trent Motor Traction, which had previously been under the ownership of British Electric Traction, became part of the National Bus Company (NBC), and in 1972, took over the operations of fellow NBC subsidiary Midland General, including its Notts & Derby Traction subsidiary; the identities of both companies, however, were retained as part of this takeover. A fire at the company's Meadow Road depot in Derby on the night of 14 July 1976 destroyed 40 buses and damaged another 12, and despite costing the operator £1 million (equivalent to £9,481,000 in 2025) in damages, operations ran as normal the following morning.

Following the passage of the Transport Act 1985, which deregulated the British bus industry and ordered the break-up of the National Bus Company, Trent Motor Traction was sold by the NBC in a management buyout, led by Brian King and Ian Morgan, to the Wellglade Limited holding company in January 1987, with the newly-independent business renamed Trent Buses. Trent Buses gained a 6% shareholding in Leicester City Transport in January 1988 following the sale of its competitive operations and depot in Loughborough, Leicestershire, and in 1989, the business of Barton Transport was purchased by Trent Buses for £22 million (equivalent to £58,211,000 in 2025), becoming a separate subsidiary company of the main Trent Buses operation, although both subsidiaries soon began co-ordinating their operations on a day-to-day basis. Following the introduction of a corporate livery scheme, the separate Trent Buses and Barton Transport companies began to be brought together as 'Trentbarton' from 2002 onwards, with a merger of the companies formally completed in 2005.

During September 2022, it was announced that managing director Jeff Counsell was to retire in February 2023. He was succeeded by Tom Morgan, the former commercial director for the Trentbarton and Kinchbus companies.

== Services and brands ==
Trentbarton operates services from Loughborough, Ashbourne, Burton upon Trent, Chesterfield, Derby, Ilkeston, Mansfield, and Nottingham with most operating under a brand name with branded vehicles although some still use conventional route numbers, Some services within the network operate through to around 03:00 on Saturday and Sunday mornings.

During the 1990s and 2000s, Trentbarton operated a large network of 'Rainbow Routes', with frequent services running from Nottingham and Derby under R-prefixed route numbers, replacing pre-existing numbered services. The first of these routes was launched in early 1992, operating using a fleet of 20 new Optare Deltas cleaned out in front of passengers at Derby bus station between service runs. The relaunched routes saw a 5% rise in ridership in their first four weeks of operation.

Services part of the Rainbow Routes network included R11, R12 and R13 from Nottingham to Eastwood and into Derbyshire, later rebranded to 'Rainbow One' and 'Rainbow Allestree', the latter running from Derby to the village of Allestree; this service is now known as 'The Allestree'. Most of the Rainbow routes were rebranded in the early 2000s leaving just 'Rainbow 1 to 5', running frequent buses from Nottingham to various suburban towns. Branding for Rainbows 2 through 5 were later rebranded into The Two (2009), The Threes (2012), i4 (2012) and Indigo (2008) respectively, leaving just 'Rainbow One' as the remaining Rainbow Routes brand.

'Indigo' became the first Trentbarton bus service to operate a '24 hours a day, 7 days a week' from 24 July 2011. 'Indigo' also operated between East Midlands Airport and Loughborough until March 2012, when that section of the route was replaced by a revised 'skylink Nottingham' service, which runs between Nottingham and East Midlands Airport via a quicker route.

Buses operate from Nottingham to the suburbs of Calverton, Cotgrave and Keyworth while the 'mainline' and 'rushcliffe villager' run along the A52 to Bingham and Radcliffe-on-Trent.

In Derby, Trentbarton run some urban services, such as the limited-stopping Comet service, and 'The Mickleover' and 'The Allestree'. There are also a number of longer-distance services for example 'Swift' to Uttoxeter and 'The Sixes' to Belper, Matlock and Bakewell with their unusual numbering system: 6.0, 6.1, 6.2, 6.3, 6.4, 6E, 6N and 6X. 'The Villager' services run south to Burton on Trent with the numbering system V1 and V3 (although V3 is no longer considered as a part of The Villager brand) plus a number of services run north towards Ilkeston and Heanor such as the Ilkeston Flyer and 'H1' respectively.

Trentbarton also runs the Xprss38, a non-stop route between Derby and Burton, which was formerly named the X38 and operated jointly with Arriva Derby before becoming an independent route on 31 August 2024 after a dispute between the two operators.

Trentbarton also operates a number of express services around the East Midlands. These include:

- 'Red Arrow' service from Nottingham to Derby.
- Comet from Chesterfield to Derby via Clay Cross, Alfreton and Ripley
- Xprss38 service from Derby to Burton upon Trent
- Skylink Express from Nottingham to East Midlands Gateway and Airport
- Rainbow One from Nottingham to Eastwood, Heanor, Alfreton, Ripley and Jacksdale

Services that operate with conventional numbers (for example V3) are operated using plain red vehicles which feature branding advertisements for the Mango and Hugo apps, these vehicles also substitute for a branded vehicle if it is unavailable.

As a result of driver shortages and lower passenger numbers following the COVID-19 pandemic, Trentbarton announced in August 2022 that already-suspended services Spondon Flyer and 1A would officially be withdrawn, while service 141 would be transferring to Stagecoach East Midlands from 4 September. From 2 October 2022, a number of other services were revised alongside the creation of a new local network centred around Ilkeston and Heanor to replace long-standing services, including Amberline and Black Cat.

The new network was introduced with new routes 31, 32, 33, and 34 to replace the long lasting routes 20, 21, amberline, black cat, and connect C1 and C2 on the 2nd of October 2022.

=== High Peak Buses ===
In April 2012, Trentbarton entered into a joint venture with Centrebus. This saw the company's operation in Buxton combined with Bowers Coaches to form High Peak Buses.

The joint company operates all services previously run by Bowers Coaches, as well as the Buxton operations of Trentbarton, including the 199 service, which runs between Buxton and Manchester Airport via Stockport, as well as the Transpeak service which runs between Buxton and Derby via Matlock, and also used to run on from Buxton towards Stockport and Manchester.

=== Ticketing schemes ===
The 'Mango' system was initially tested on the company's Rainbow 4 (now i4) and Indigo routes. After this proved successful, Trentbarton proceeded to extend the scheme to all of its services.

Trentbarton previously had a scheme called Kangaroo which included daily and weekly travel cards, as well as the longer running Kangaroo Seasons card. The Kangaroo Seasons card became the Robin Hood card in 2016.

== Depots ==
Trentbarton operates from depots in Derby, Langley Mill, Nottingham and Sutton in Ashfield, with outstations located in Ashbourne, Belper and Matlock. The Langley Mill depot also serves as the headquarters for Trentbarton and the wider Wellglade Group.

Optare Solo SR "trentbarton" livery seen at Burton Upon Trent on route V3.

== Fleet ==
Trentbarton operates a wide range of vehicle types from their bus depots, including Wrightbus bodies, Alexander Dennis bodies and Optare bodies.

Trentbarton operated buses with the Wright Solar body in public service until July 2026, when the last was withdrawn after needing one over a weekend because of an event going on at the time, all trentbarton Wright Solar bodies were supposed to be withdrawn earlier..

== See also ==
- Notts + Derby, a Wellglade Group subsidiary with a similar operating area.
- Kinchbus, a Wellglade Group subsidiary with a main operating area of Loughborough.
- High Peak Buses, a joint venture between Wellglade and Centrebus.
