= Centrebus Group =

English transport company

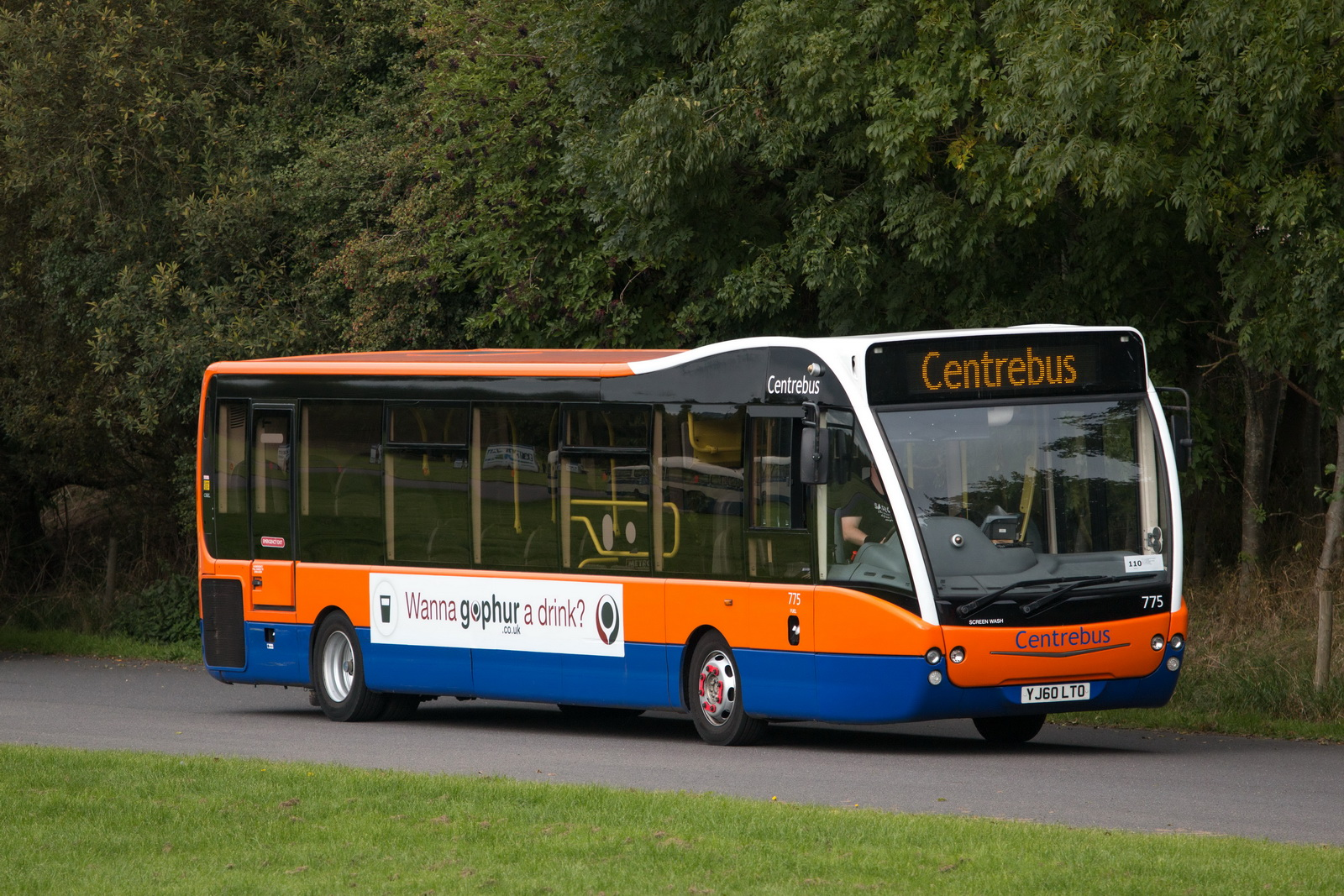
- an Optare Versa in 2017
- Type: Private Limited
- Industry: Public transport
- Founded: 2002
- Headquarters: Leicester, England
- Area served: United Kingdom
- Key people: Julian Peddle (CEO)
- Services: Bus
- Subsidiaries: Chaserider; Centrebus; High Peak Buses; D&G Bus

Centrebus Group, is a public transport company based in Leicester with bus services in the Midlands, North West and South East of England.

Owned by Julian Peddle, the group contains Chaserider, Centrebus, High Peak Buses and D&G Bus.

== History ==
Centrebus was founded during 2001 as Anstey Buslines. In 2002, they merged with the businesses of inMotion and Lutonian to form Centrebus.

== Subsidiaries and interests ==
=== High Peak Buses ===
Centrebus purchased Bowers Coaches in 2007 who operated services around the Derbyshire peaks.

During 2012 they entered a joint partnership with Wellglade Group subsidiary trentbarton to form High Peak Buses, This saw the Bowers coaches and Trent Barton's Buxton area services combined into one operation based at the latter's Dove Holes depot.

=== D&G Bus ===
D&G Bus is a bus operator serving the West Midlands and North West formed by David Reeves and Gerald Henderson in April 1998 initially operating four buses on two routes under contract to Stoke-on-Trent City Council. It expanded with both route and school services in Cheshire and Staffordshire with 16 buses by the end of 1998. In April 2005 D&G Bus purchased Wednesfield based Midland, which was sold to Arriva Midlands in 2012. In 2006 following Gerald Henderson's sudden death Julian Peddle purchased Henderson's shareholding in the business.

In December 2019, Julian Peddle's Centrebus Group purchased David Reeves shareholding in D&G bus, at present it will continue to operate as a separate unit from Centrebus.

=== Hotspur ===
During 2026, D&G bus announced they'd been successful in gaining a number of Shropshire Council contracted routes within Shrewsbury from 1st September 2026, they will be operating these services under the revived HotSpur name from a localised depot in Shrewsbury, it was later announced they will be taking over the revised Shrewsbury park-and-ride contracted routes from 1st November 2026.

=== Chaserider ===
During November 2020, D&G Bus announced they would be taking over the Cannock depot of Arriva Midlands from the end of January 2021 with operations in Cannock and Stafford running under the revived Chaserider brand.

== Former Interests ==
In January 2004, Centrebus acquired the St Albans operation of Blazefield although in March 2008 it was sold to Uno.

In May 2008 Centrebus entered into a partnership with Arriva Bus UK to form Centrebus Holdings to allow the Huddersfield operations of Stagecoach Yorkshire to be purchased. Despite the common name and livery, Centrebus Holdings has never been owned by Centrebus.

In August 2008, Arriva Midlands' depot in Hinckley was transferred to Centrebus Holdings. In September 2008, Centrebus purchased the bus operations of Woods Coaches in Leicester.

In 2013, Arriva purchased Centrebus' share of Centrebus Holdings and Hinckley operations, rebranding the Huddersfield operations as Yorkshire Tiger and the Hinckley operations as Hinckley Bus. This received approval from regulators in May 2014.
