= Bowers Coaches =

Bus company based in Derbyshire, England

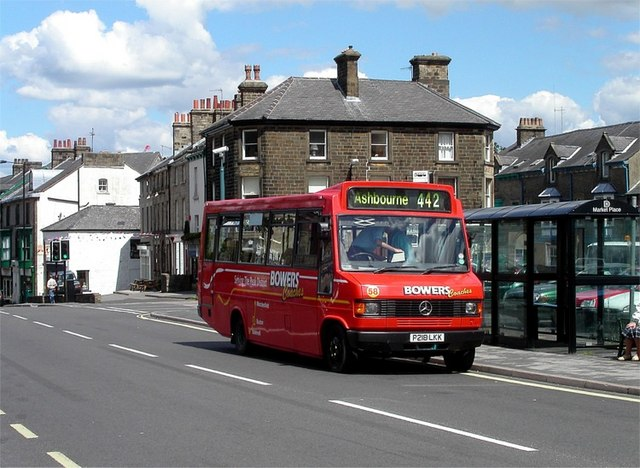
- Plaxton Beaver bodied Mercedes 709D in Buxton in May 2005
- Parent: Centrebus
- Founded: 1952
- Ceased operation: 2012 (merged to form High Peak Buses
- Headquarters: Chapel-en-le-Frith
- Locale: East Midlands; North West
- Service area: Cheshire; Derbyshire; Greater Manchester
- Service type: Bus operator
- Routes: 19 (March 2012)
- Depots: 1
- Fleet: 29 (August 2011)
- Website: www.bowersbuses.com

Bowers Coaches was a bus company based in Chapel-en-le-Frith, Derbyshire, England. The company operated bus and coach services in Cheshire, Derbyshire and Greater Manchester from 1952 until 2012. In its later years, it was a subsidiary of Centrebus and in 2012 it was merged with the Dove Holes depot of Trent Barton to form High Peak Buses.

== History ==
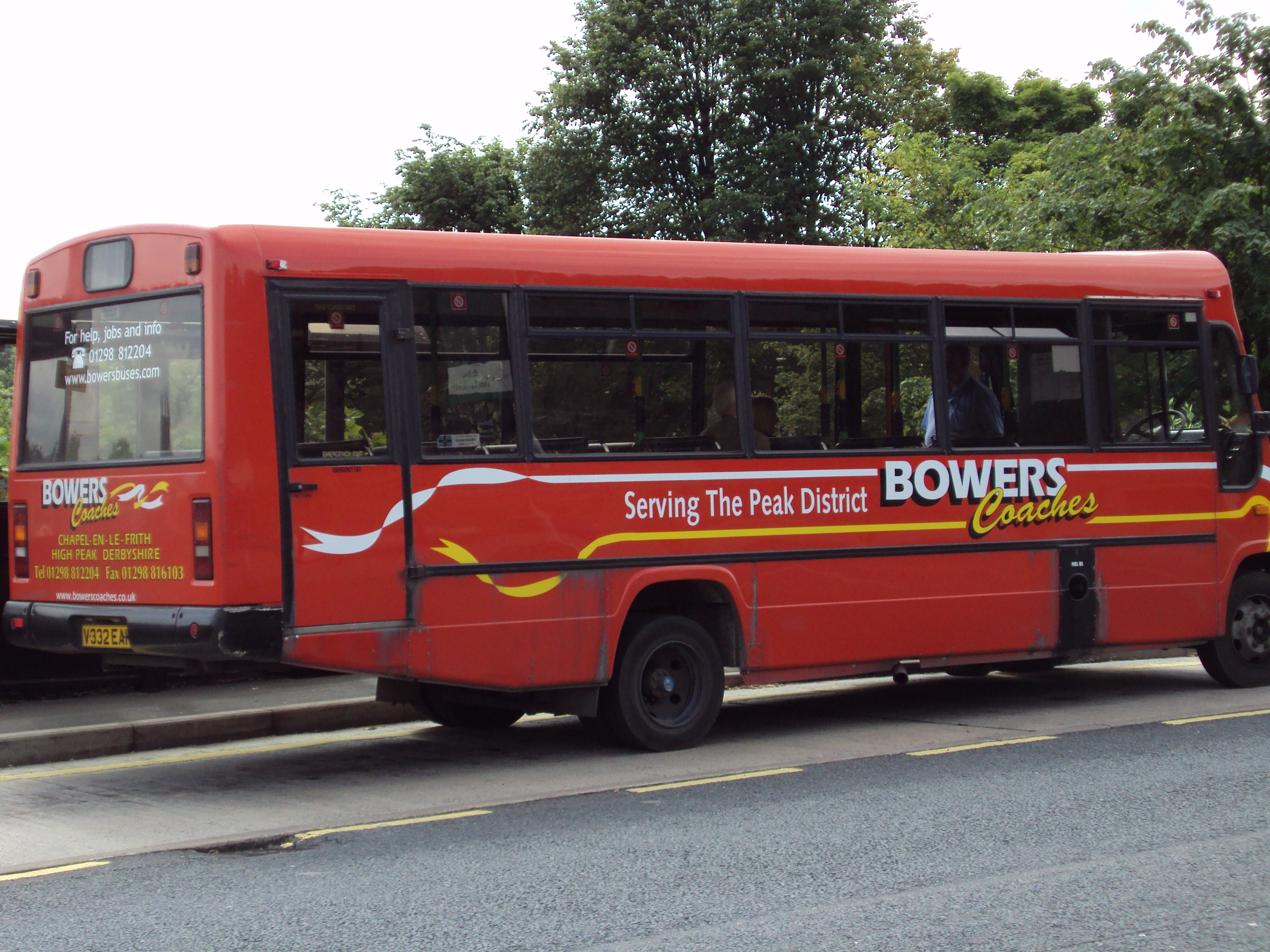
Plaxton Beaver bodied Mercedes 709D in Buxton in August 2009

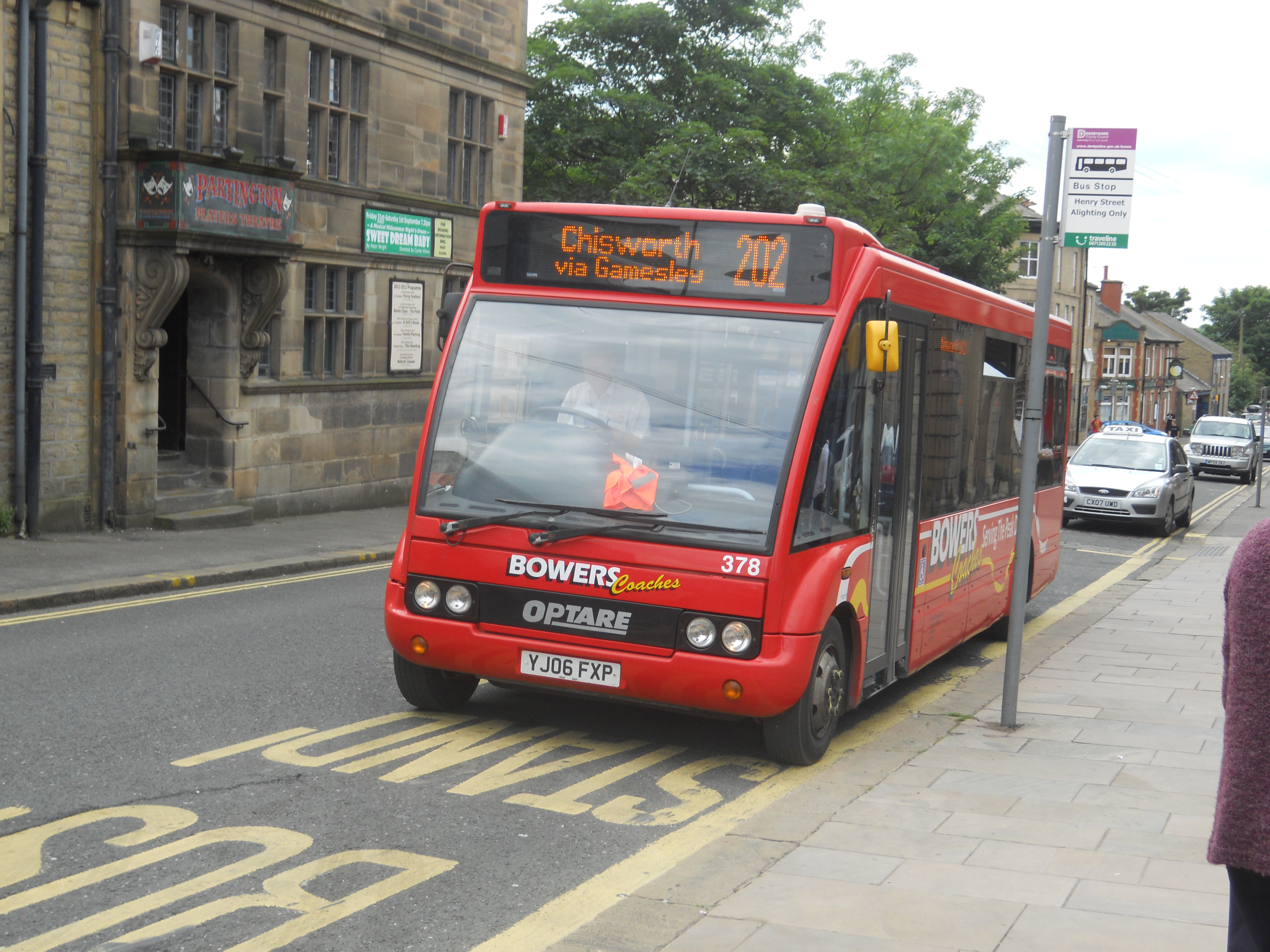
Optare Solo in Glossop in August 2012

Bowers Coaches was founded in 1952 by Eric Bower as a coach operator. In 1957, the charter operations of Park Hire Garages & Motors were acquired. It later expanded into local bus operation, particularly after the deregulation of local bus services in 1986. Based in the High Peak district of Derbyshire, it operated services centred on the towns of Buxton, Glossop and New Mills extending to some surrounding areas such as the town of Marple in Stockport and Ashbourne in the Derbyshire Dales.

In June 2007, the business was purchased by Centrebus who introduced its corporate orange and blue livery, but retained the Bowers trading name. Bowers ceased trading on 31 March 2012 when Centrebus entered a 50/50 joint venture with Wellglade Group that saw the latter's Trent Barton subsidiary combine its Dove Holes operations with those of Bowers to form High Peak Buses.

Although the trading name has ceased to be used, services are still operated using Bowers Coaches operating licence.

== Routes ==
As at March 2012, Bowers Coaches operated 19 routes:

- 19: Macclesfield to Prestbury
- 27: Macclesfield to Chelford via Knutsford
- 42: Buxton to Ashbourne
- 58: Buxton to Macclesfield
- 60: Buxton to Disley
- 61: Buxton to Glossop via New Mills and Hayfield
- 62: Marple to Hayfield via New Mills
- 64: Macclesfield to Glossop via New Mills and Hayfield
- 69: Hayfield to Chapel-en-le-Frith via New Mills
- 69A: Glossop to Chapel-en-le-Frith via Hayfield
- 76: Buxton Town Service
- 189: Buxton to Whaley Bridge via Dove Holes, Chapel-en-le-Frith and Chinley
- 190: Buxton to Whaley Bridge via Peak Forest, Chapel-en-le-Frithand Chinley
- 300: Knutsford Town Circular
- 389: New Mills Town Service
- 393: Padfield to Shirebrook Park via Glossop
- 394: Glossop to Stepping Hill Hospital via Marple
- 411: Ashbourne to Parwich
- 442: Ashbourne to Buxton via Hartington, Warslow and Longnor

The majority were operated under contract to Derbyshire County Council and other local authorities; however, a number of services such as route 61 between Glossop and Buxton were operated commercially. Until September 2007, the company operated an hourly service between Hayfield and Stockport, Greater Manchester as route 62/62A; however, this service was withdrawn to run only as far as Marple due to falling revenues.

== Fleet ==
As at August 2011, Bowers operated a fleet of 29 buses.
