= Centrebus =

English bus operator

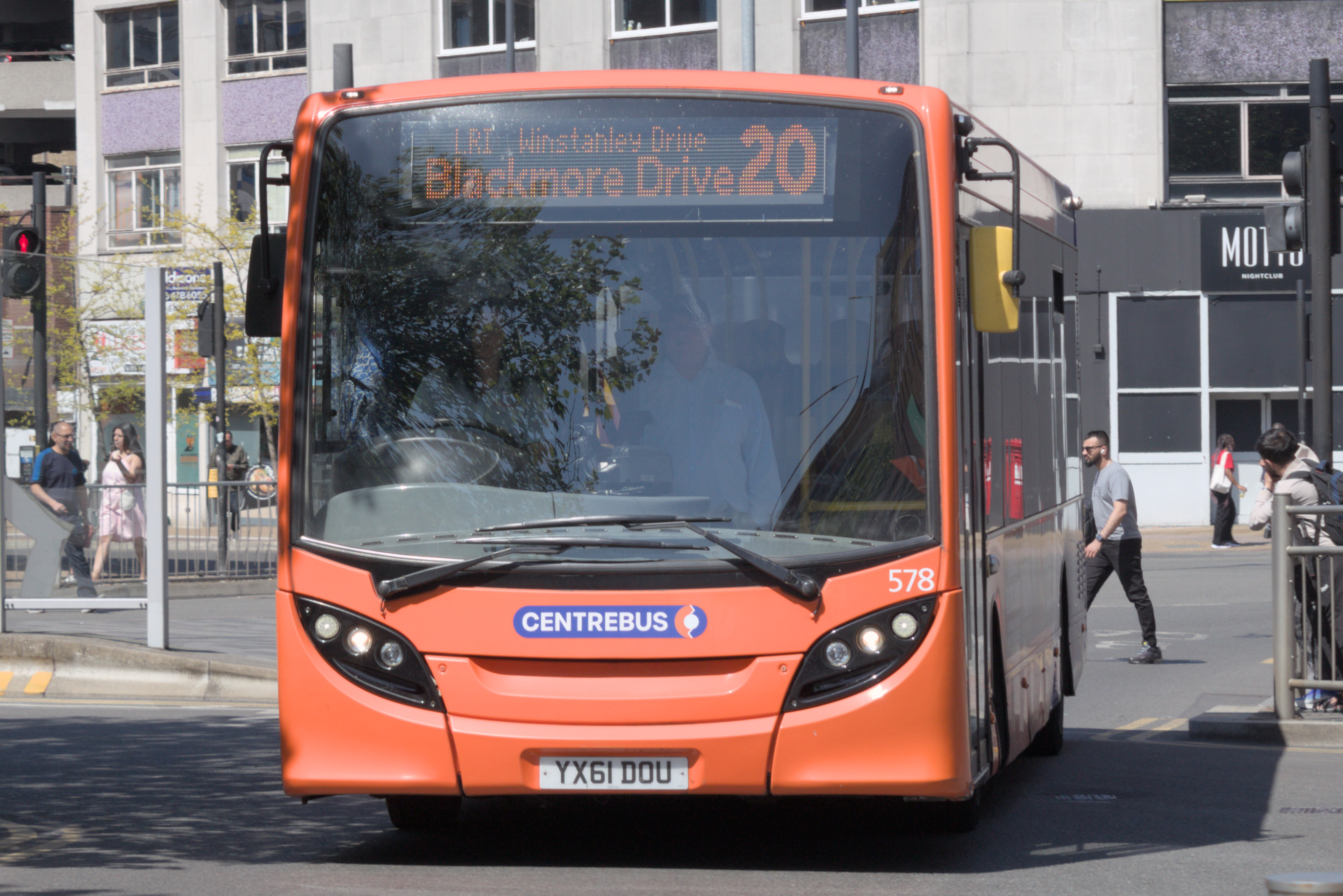
- Enviro200 operating service 20 in Leicester with the revised Centrebus logo.
- Founded: 2001
- Headquarters: Wenlock Way, Leicester
- Service area: Bedfordshire; Hertfordshire; Leicestershire; Lincolnshire; Rutland
- Service type: Bus services
- Depots: Grantham; Leicester; Luton
- Fleet: 380+ (August 2024)
- Chief executive: Julian Peddle
- Website: www.centrebus.info

Centrebus Limited, trading as Centrebus, is a bus company based in Leicester operating services in Bedfordshire, Hertfordshire, Leicestershire, Lincolnshire, Nottinghamshire and Rutland.

Centrebus hold a 51% shareholding in High Peak Buses and since December 2019 D&G Bus has become a part of the Centrebus Group through shareholder Julian Peddle.

== History ==
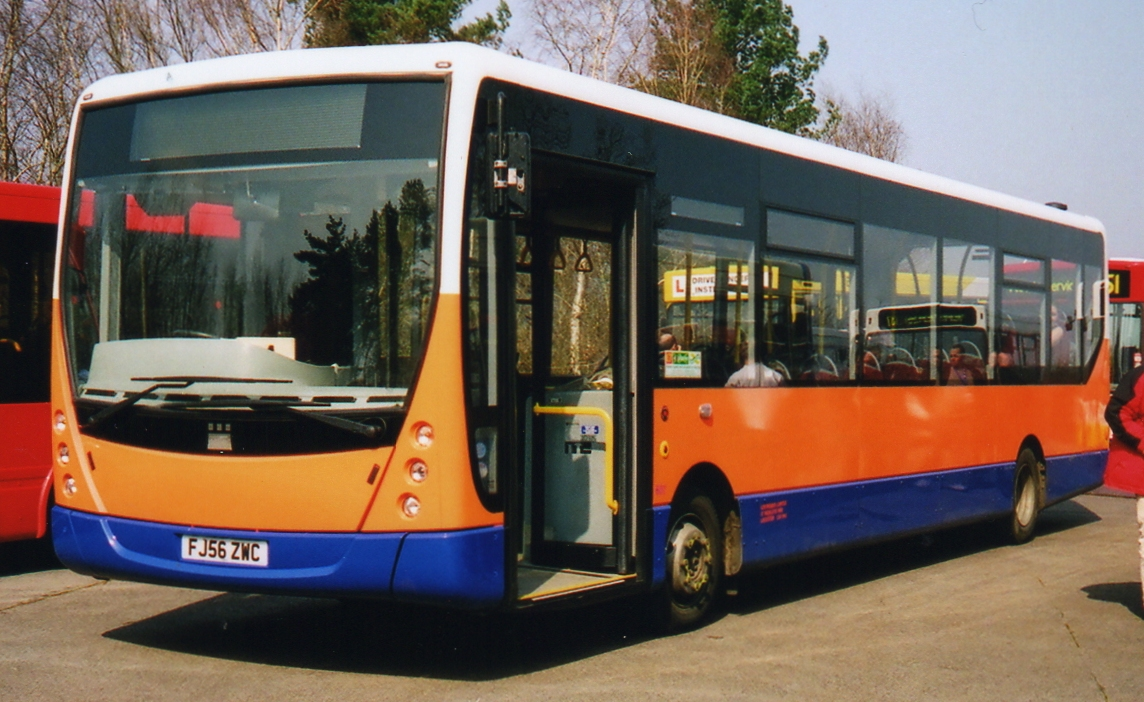
Plaxton Centro bodied VDL SB120 in April 2007

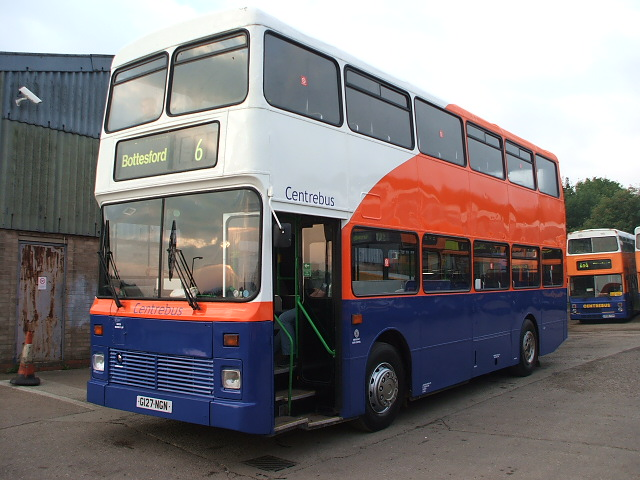
Northern Counties Palatine bodied Volvo B10M-50 in September 2008

Centrebus was founded in 2001, it was previously known as Anstey Buslines. In 2002, the businesses of inMotion, Dunstable, Lutonian, Luton and Centrebus, Leicester merged to form the basis of the business today.

=== Former Operations ===
In January 2004, Centrebus acquired the St Albans operation of Blazefield although in March 2008 it was sold to Uno. During February 2005 operations commenced around Grantham, following the closure of MASS Transit.

In June 2007, Centrebus purchased Bowers Coaches, which through a joint venture with Wellglade Group became High Peak Buses in 2012. based in Chapel-en-le-Frith, Derbyshire. Bowers operated services around Cheshire, Derbyshire and Greater Manchester. In April 2012 Centrebus transferred the business into a joint venture with the Wellglade Group to form High Peak Buses with Bowers operations relocated to Trent Barton's Dove Holes depot.

Centrebus shareholders formed Centrebus Holdings in May 2008 with Arriva taking a 40% shareholding. Centrebus Holdings was an independent company from the main business, but was managed by Centrebus on a day-to-day basis. In September 2013, Arriva bought out its partners with the West Yorkshire operations rebranded as Yorkshire Tiger and the Hinckley operations as Hinckley Bus. Despite the name, Centrebus Holdings has never had any shareholding in Centrebus, and was formed to take over K-Line and Stagecoach Huddersfield, and subsequently the Hinckley operations of Arriva Midlands.

In September 2008, Centrebus purchased the local bus operations of the Woods Coaches, Leicestershire business. In August 2009, the business of Trustybus, with operations in Essex and Hertfordshire, was acquired by Centrebus. In August 2010 Centrebus took over the operations of Judges Mini Coaches, Corby with routes serving Kettering, Milton Keynes, Welford, Wellingborough, Wicken and Yardley Gobion.

In May 2011, Centrebus took over West End Travel of Melton Mowbray and its fleet of buses and services in Melton Mowbray and Rural Rider services. In October 2011 Centrebus purchased Paul James Coaches, Saxby from Veolia Transport with 21 buses.

In July 2011 Centrebus took over the business of Kimes Buses, Folkingham. Kimes was founded in 1945 and sold in January 1997 to its employees. It operated a fleet of 23 vehicles at the time of the takeover. Its green and cream livery and the Kimes name were retained by Centrebus. In August 2013 the depot was closed with operations transferred to Centrebus' Grantham depot.

=== Network contraction ===
In November 2012, Centrebus closed its Harlow depot with most routes passing to Roadrunner Buses. The remaining routes moved to the Stevenage depot, allowing the business to consolidate its East Hertfordshire operations on a single site.

In June 2017, Centrebus closed its Saxby depot, citing rising costs and declining patronage with all services passing to either Leicester or Grantham depots.

In October 2019, Centrebus closed its Corby depot, citing rising costs and declining patronage with services passing to other depots or operators.

In May 2021, Stevenage Depot was closed by Centrebus with most services moved to Luton depot. some routes were transferred to Luton while others were transferred to other operators, with Trustybus, Richmonds, A2B Travel and Chiltern Automotive all taking on former Centrebus routes.

== Depots ==
Centrebus currently operate from four depots across England:

- Wenlock Way for the Leicester operations,
- Tollemache Road for Grantham operations,
- Hallsteads, Dove Holes for HighPeak operations,
- Bilton Way for Luton operations/Hertfordshire routes.

Wenlock Way, Leicester is also the headquarters of Centrebus Group.

=== Electric Buses ===
During 2021 Leicester City Council successfully applied for £19 million of funding from the Government's ZEBRA scheme with Centrebus operating five Yutong E12 electric buses on the University Hospitals of Leicester Hospital Hopper service, Centrebus gained a further six Yutong E10 buses during late 2022 for the 40 Orbital. A further three Yutong E9 mini-buses were added to the Leicester fleet in April 2023 for the Hop! Leicester City Centre free bus service.
