= Notts + Derby =

Bus operator, part of Wellglade group

Notts+Derby

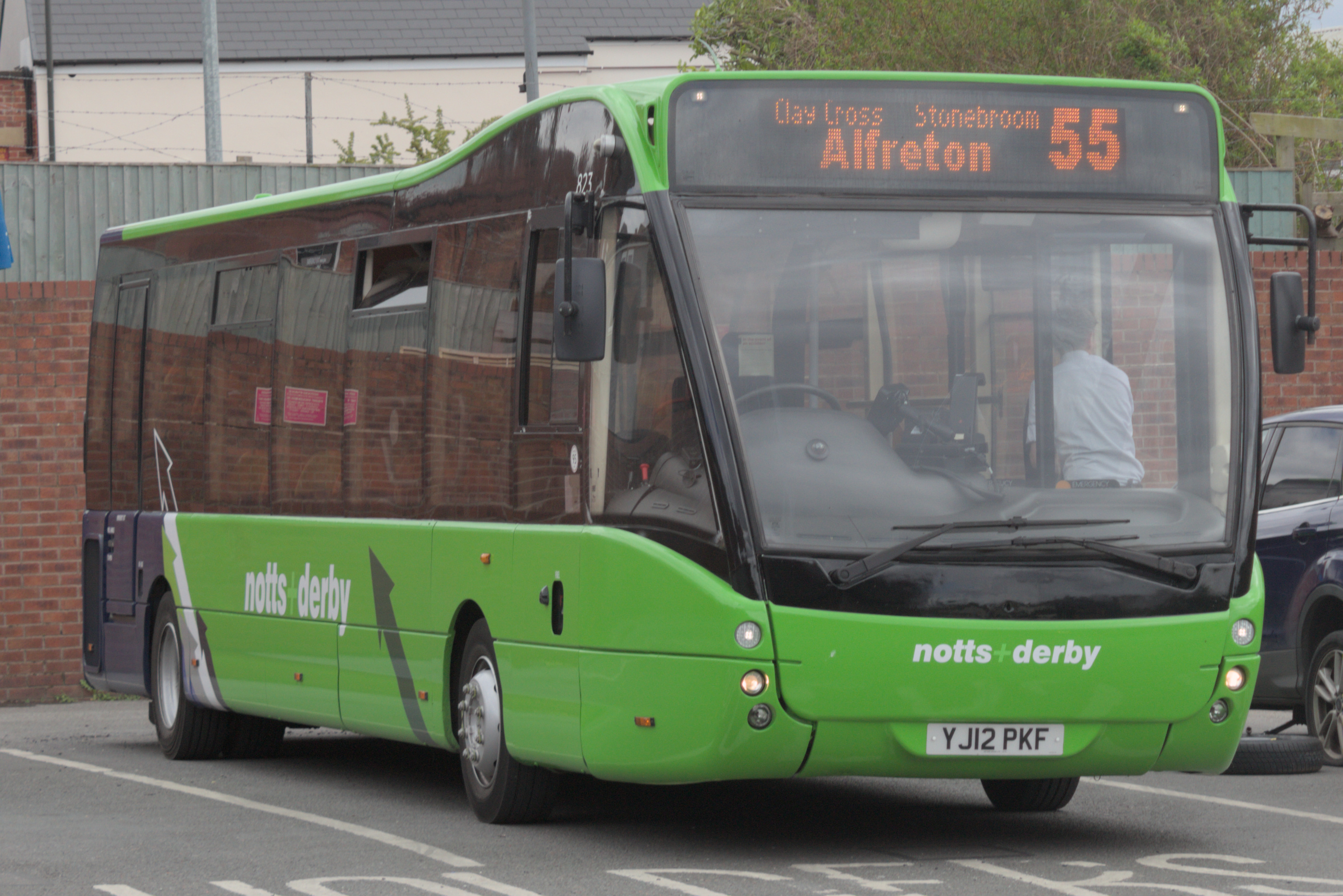
- Optare Versa parked outside Chesterfield Coach Station in May 2025
- Parent: Wellglade Group
- Founded: 1986
- Headquarters: Derby
- Service area: Nottinghamshire; Derbyshire
- Service type: Bus services
- Fleet: 66 (Jan 2025)
- Website: www.nottsderby.co.uk

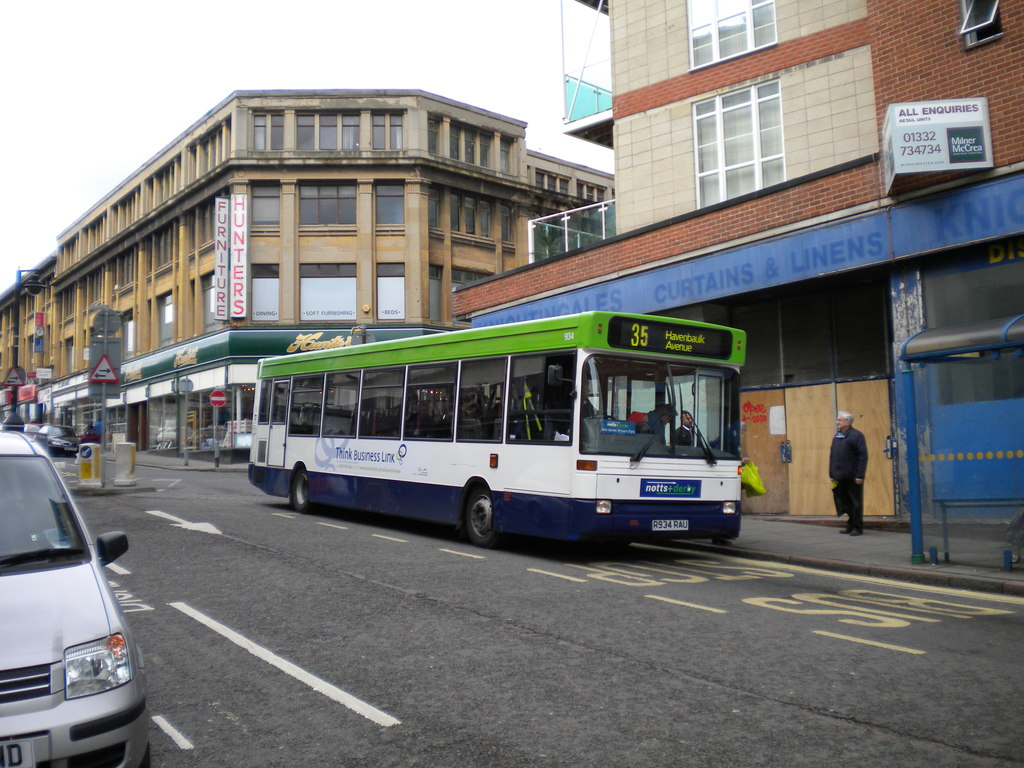
Plaxton Pointer 1 bodied Dennis Dart SLF in Derby in March 2010

Notts+Derby is a bus operator providing services in Nottinghamshire and Derbyshire. It is a subsidiary of the Wellglade Group.

== Services ==
Notts+Derby operate a number of contracted bus services around Nottinghamshire and Derbyshire. One of their largest contracts is with the University of Derby for services linking students with campuses and other key locations in Derby.

Notts+Derby also operate Derby College shuttle buses between their three main campuses.

As a result of CT4N ceasing trading on 14th August 2026, Notts+Derby had been awarded the contract by EMCCA to provide the replacement services for parts of services 20, L2, L4 and L14, which commence(d) operation on 1st September 2026.

As of November 2024, Notts+Derby operate the following commercial and tendered bus services:

Routes and Services
Route number	Route	Notes
2	Chaddesden - City Centre - Moy Park	
19	Spondon circular	
27	Larklands - Ilkeston - Kimberley - Swingate	
55	Chesterfield - Alfreton	
59 59A	Derby - Breadsall - Stanley Common - West Hallam - Ilkeston - Shipley View	
71 72	Derby - Little Eaton - Holbrook - Bargate - Openwoodgate - The Fleet - Belper	
71 72	Most journeys then continue beyond Belper to Whitehouse Rise as service 72	
137	Langley - Heanor - Loscoe - Bargate - Openwoodgate - Belper - St Elizabeth School	
138	Belper - Parks Estate - Kilburn - Loscoe - Heanor - Langley	
147	Parks Estate - Belper - Ambergate - Ripley - Street Lane	
148	Alfreton - Pentrich - Ripley - Elms Estate - Codnor - Waingroves - Porterhouse - Ripley - Pentrich - Alfreton	
148A	Alfreton - Pentrich - Ripley - Porterhouse - Codnor - Waingroves - Elms Estate - Ripley - Pentrich - Alfreton	
Royal Derby	Royal Derby Hospital - City Centre - Florence Nightingale Hospital	
Link2	Royal Derby Hospital - Mickleover - Langley Country Park - Mackworth - Royal Derby Hospital	

University of Derby UniBus services are provided by Notts+Derby

UniBus Routes and Services
Route number	Route
U1/U1X	Derby Train Station to Derby University (Via City Centre, Cathedral Court, Princess Alice Court, Sir Peter Hilton Court and Peak Court)
U2	University of Derby campus circular service via Markeaton Park, Ashbourne Rd and Britannia Mill

== Fleet ==
As of January 2025, the fleet consists of 66 vehicles. Fleet models include: Optare Solos, Plaxton Centros, as well as ex-Nottingham City Transport Scania Omnidekkas, ADL Enviro 400s and Wright Eclipse Geminis from other operators within the Wellglade Group.

Notts+Derby received their first new buses in the summer of 2022, two Enviro 200MMCs and three ADL Enviro 400s will join the fleet for the UniBus services. One of the Scania Omnidekka's in the fleet was destroyed after catching fire on 11 July 2022. They also operate a small number of Fiat Ducato & Mercedes-Benz Sprinter minibuses for Derby Community Transport services.
