= Optare Solo =

Low floor minibus/midibus, built since 1998

Optare Solo Switch Solo SR
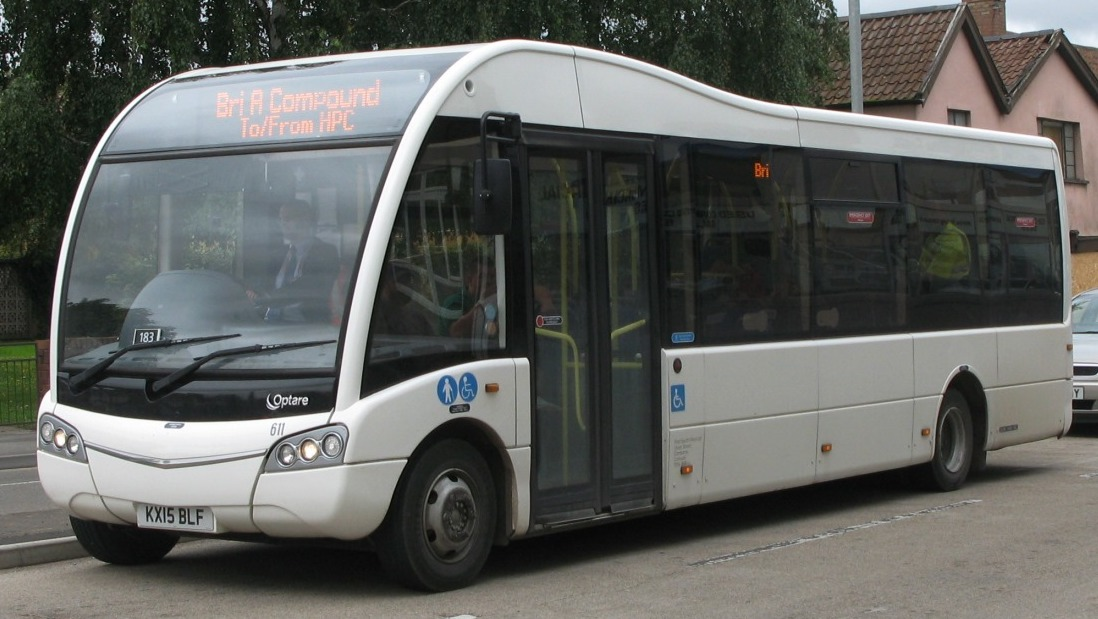
- Somerset Passenger Solutions Optare Solo SR in Bridgwater in August 2017

Overview
- Manufacturer: Optare/Switch Mobility
- Production: 1998–2012 (Solo); 2008–2025 (Solo SR)

Body and chassis
- Class: Minibus; Midibus
- Body style: Single-decker bus
- Doors: 1 door or 2 doors
- Floor type: Low entry

Powertrain
- Engine: Cummins B series/ISB/ISBe; MAN; Mercedes-Benz
- Capacity: 17–37 seated
- Transmission: Allison; Siemens (hybrid electric); Enova Systems (fully electric); Magtec (fully electric); Voith DIWA (SR version only)

Dimensions
- Length: 7.10–10.30 m (23 ft 4 in – 33 ft 10 in)
- Width: 2.33–2.5 m (7 ft 8 in – 8 ft 2 in)
- Height: 2.73 m (8 ft 11 in)

Chronology
- Predecessor: Optare MetroRider

The Switch Solo (formerly sold as the Optare Solo) is a low-floor minibus/midibus with one or two doors manufactured by Switch Mobility in the United Kingdom from 1998 until 2025. The Solo name is a play on its low-floor status, the manufacturer marketing its vehicle as having an entrance that is "so low" from the floor, namely 200 mm (8 in) with kneeling suspension. In January 2012, Optare announced the end of production for the original Solo design with a modified Solo SR taking over.

The original innovative design, featuring a front axle ahead of the entrance door, gained a Millennium product award, along with a Queen's Award for Enterprise, in 2000.

== Construction ==
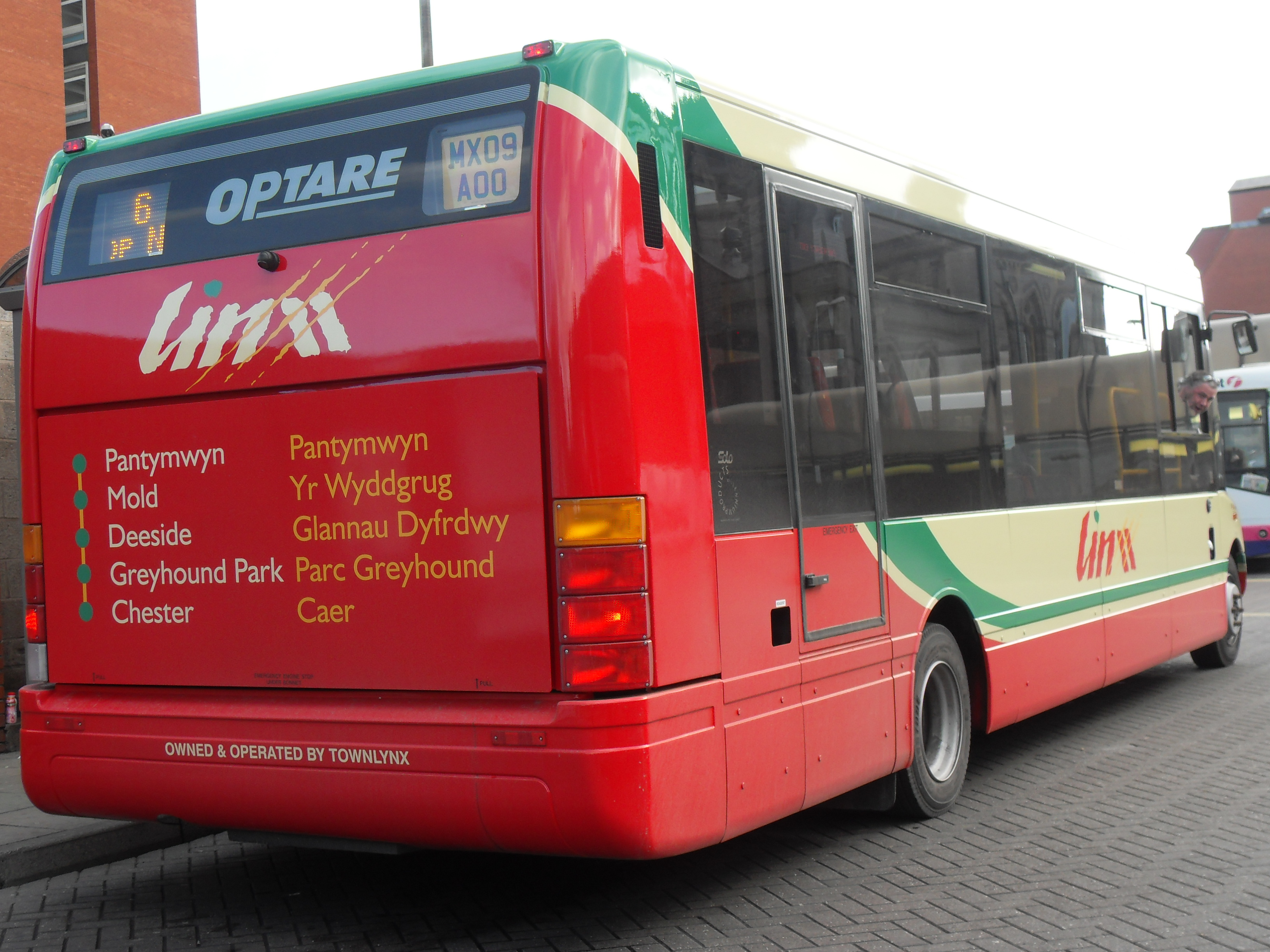
Rear of a Townlynx Solo M880 in Chester in April 2009

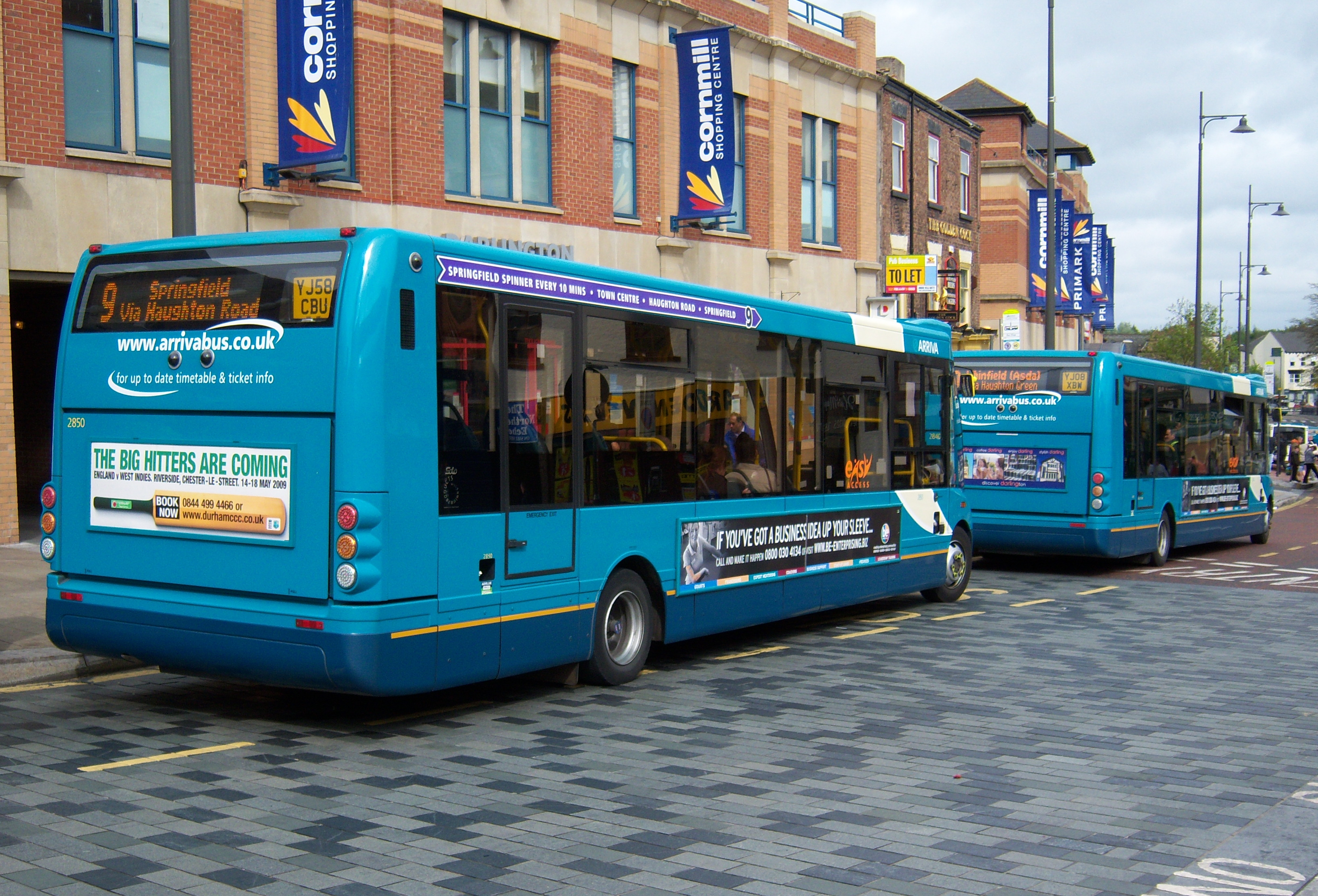
Rear of an Arriva North East Solo M950 in Darlington in May 2009. Note the difference in tail lights used on both rears.

The Solo is an integral midibus (as opposed to a separate chassis and body) built in a modular design, with steel frame and fibreglass panels. It is powered by a Mercedes-Benz OM904LA engine, which produces 122 bhp (91 kW) or 147 bhp (110 kW) according to specification, and it is typically mated to an Allison 2000 automatic gearbox. Options of a Cummins ISBe 6-cylinder 185 bhp (138 kW) engine or a MAN engine later became available. There was also the option of a 4-speed Allison AT545 gearbox. In 2005 a hybrid Solo was constructed, using a small diesel unit and an Eneco (now known as Traction Technology) battery propulsion unit.

The Switch Solo is available in various lengths: 7.8 m (25 ft 7 in), 8.5 m (27 ft 11 in), 9.2 m (30 ft 2 in) and 9.9 m (32 ft 6 in) - all 2.5 m (8 ft 2 in) wide. The chassis type code of the Solo denotes the length – M780 corresponds to 7.8 m, M850 to 8.5 m, and so forth. However, the Cummins-powered Solos required extra rear bodywork in order to accommodate the larger engine, which increased the overall length by 0.3 m (1 ft). This is reflected in the chassis code, so a Cummins-powered Solo was coded M810, M880, M950 or M1020.

Along with the launch of the 9.9 m (32 ft 6 in) model, the Solo was also first offered with LED-type rear lights, as opposed to the standard rectangular clusters. Seating capacities range from 25 for an M780, 29 for an M850, 33 for M920 and 37 for an M990.

== Original variants ==
=== Slimline ===
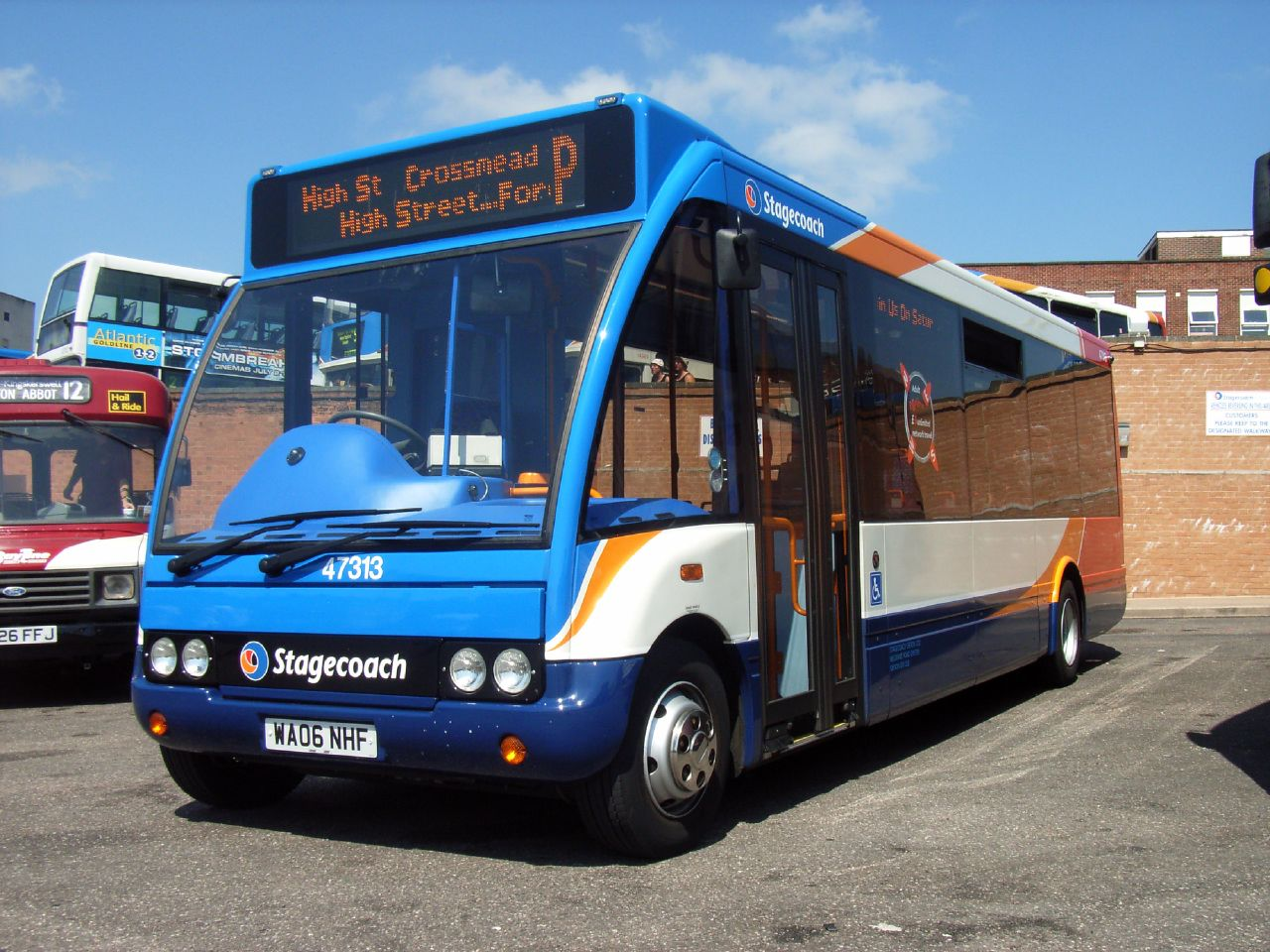
Stagecoach South West Solo Slimline in Exeter in July 2006

A narrow-bodied version named the "Slimline" was launched in 2004 with the first examples entering service in August. It is 2.33 m (7 ft 8 in) wide, and identifiable by small rear wheel wheelarch extensions. Available across all lengths except the M990, the Slimline is identified by having an SL-suffix in the chassis code, e.g. M780SL for a 7.8 m (25 ft 7 in) long version. The Optare Solo Slimline is a 25-seated low-floor bus to replace the Optare MetroRider.

The compact size of an M780SL, with its seating capacity of 25, has made it a popular choice for replacing earlier-generation minibuses, such as the MCW Metrorider, and other van-based buses.

=== SE ===
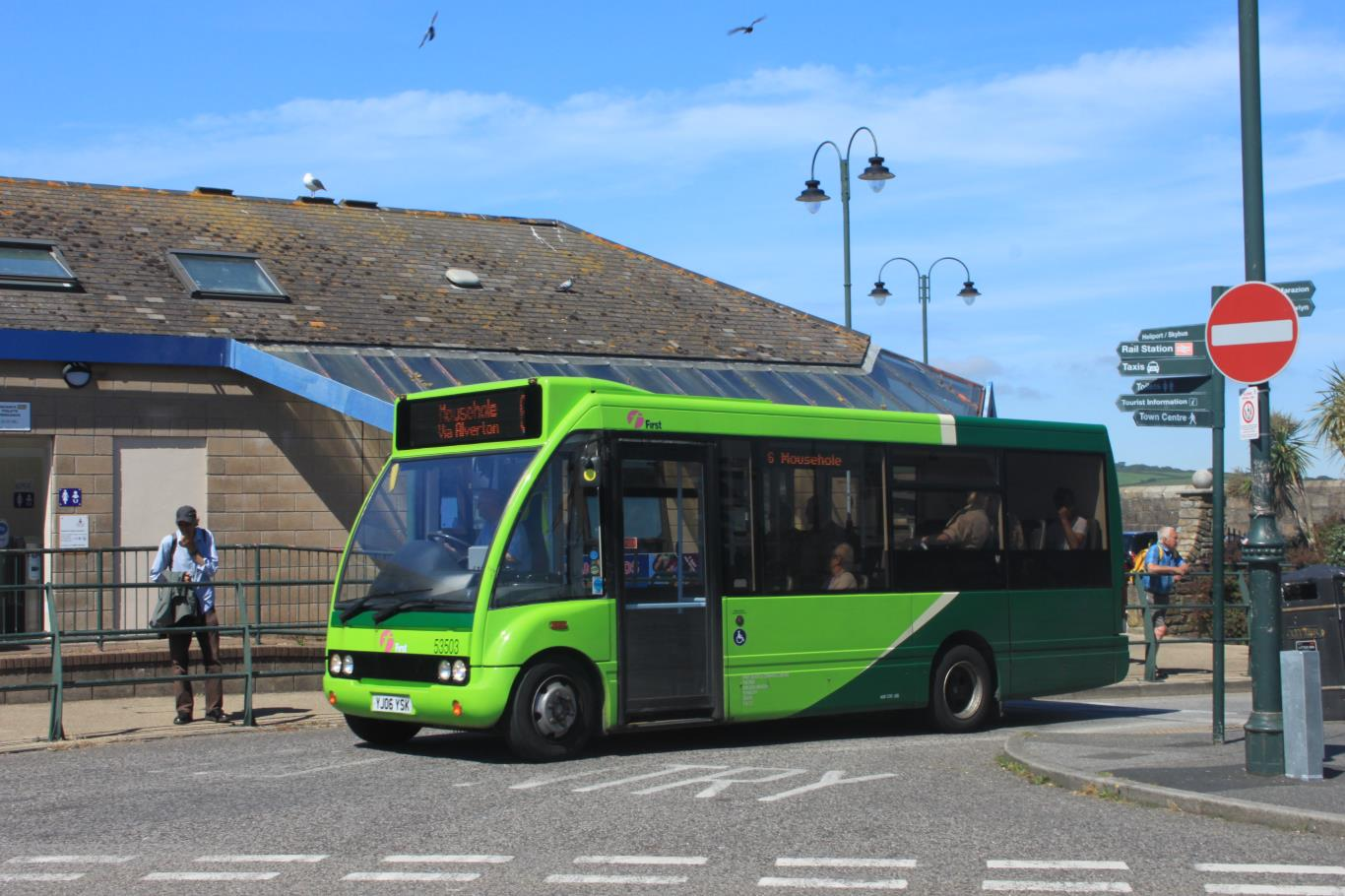
First South West Solo SE at Penzance station in June 2015

In June 2006, Optare announced the arrival of another Solo model – the Solo SE. At just 7.1 m (23 ft 4 in) in length, it is the shortest Solo offered, and is capable of seating 23. It also uses a single-piece entrance door as an option. This is a variant of the Slimline – hence it is 2.33 m (7 ft 8 in) wide, but noticeably the rear track has been reduced compared to previous Slimline models, eliminating the need for wheelarch extensions on the rear of the bus. Optare also produced a 7.8 m (25 ft 7 in) long version of the SE.

The first SE built, the former Optare demonstrator, entered service with Regal Busways, of Essex, in September 2006. The company has since acquired a further four examples.

=== Hybrid ===
Optare first experimented with a hybrid electric variant of the Solo in 2004, supplying Solo body shells for Dutch utility company Eneco, who had developed a hybrid drive system consisting of a Volkswagen 1.9 litres (0.42 imp gal; 0.50 US gal) engine paired with a Siemens electric generator. The hybrid system was configurable in three tuneable modes: a 'diesel electric urban' mode, a 'full electric drive' mode that allowed the bus to travel up to 8 kilometres (5.0 mi) on battery power, and a 'motorway mode', allowing for the bus to reach the maximum speed limit. This system was fitted to the Solo shells, which were sold to a handful of operators such as First Bristol and Merseytravel, and was also retrofitted to a First Manchester Solo first delivered to the operator in 2002. However, operational issues with the hybrid system, including high fuel consumption and engine noise, meant that most of these early hybrid Solos were eventually converted back to diesel power.

Optare later launched a hybrid electric Solo in 2010, this time featuring a Euro VI Mercedes-Benz OM904LA engine paired with a Siemens electric drive system, with Bluways battery capacitors mounted on the roof of the Solo body. This combination allowed for a power output of 130 kilowatts (170 hp) and a 30% reduction in carbon dioxide emissions compared to diesel Solos. On the original Solo body, the first ten Solo hybrids were exported to Arriva Malta in 2011, with further deliveries of Solo hybrids being made to Cumfybus of Southport and Uno of Hatfield.

=== EV ===
In March 2009, Optare launched the all-electric version of the Solo, the Solo EV. The vehicle's top speed is limited to 90 km/h (56 mph). Since the summer of 2013, the vehicle uses a high-efficiency MAGTEC P180 Permanent Magnet Motor-Gearbox rated at 150 kW and powered by two banks of Valence lithium-ion phosphate batteries. The two packs work in parallel and provide 307 V with a total capacity of 92 kWh.

== Solo^{+} ==
In November 2008 the 'new' Optare unveiled the Solo^{+} – a completely restyled variant to celebrate ten years of the Solo as a new low-entry bus and was launched at the Euro Bus Expo 2008. It shared the same styling with the Rapta, which was launched at the same show. It sees the return of the flat side windows and roof as well as a steeper front end with an integral destination box. Proposed options include a full electric drive.

However, the plan of producing the Solo^{+} was dropped afterwards. The new product met with a poor market response and never made it beyond the prototype stage.

== Solo SR ==
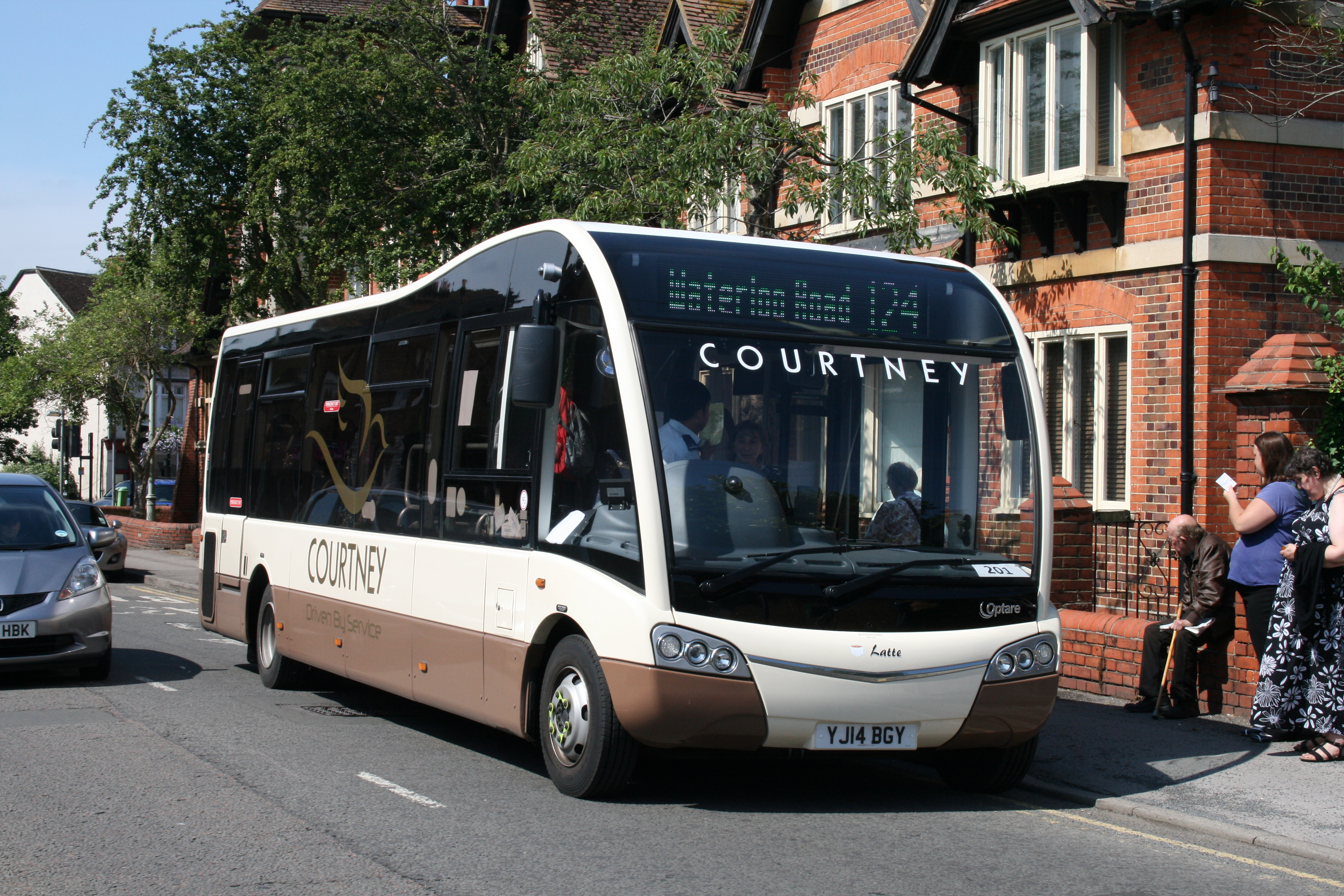
Courtney Buses Solo SR in Wokingham in July 2014

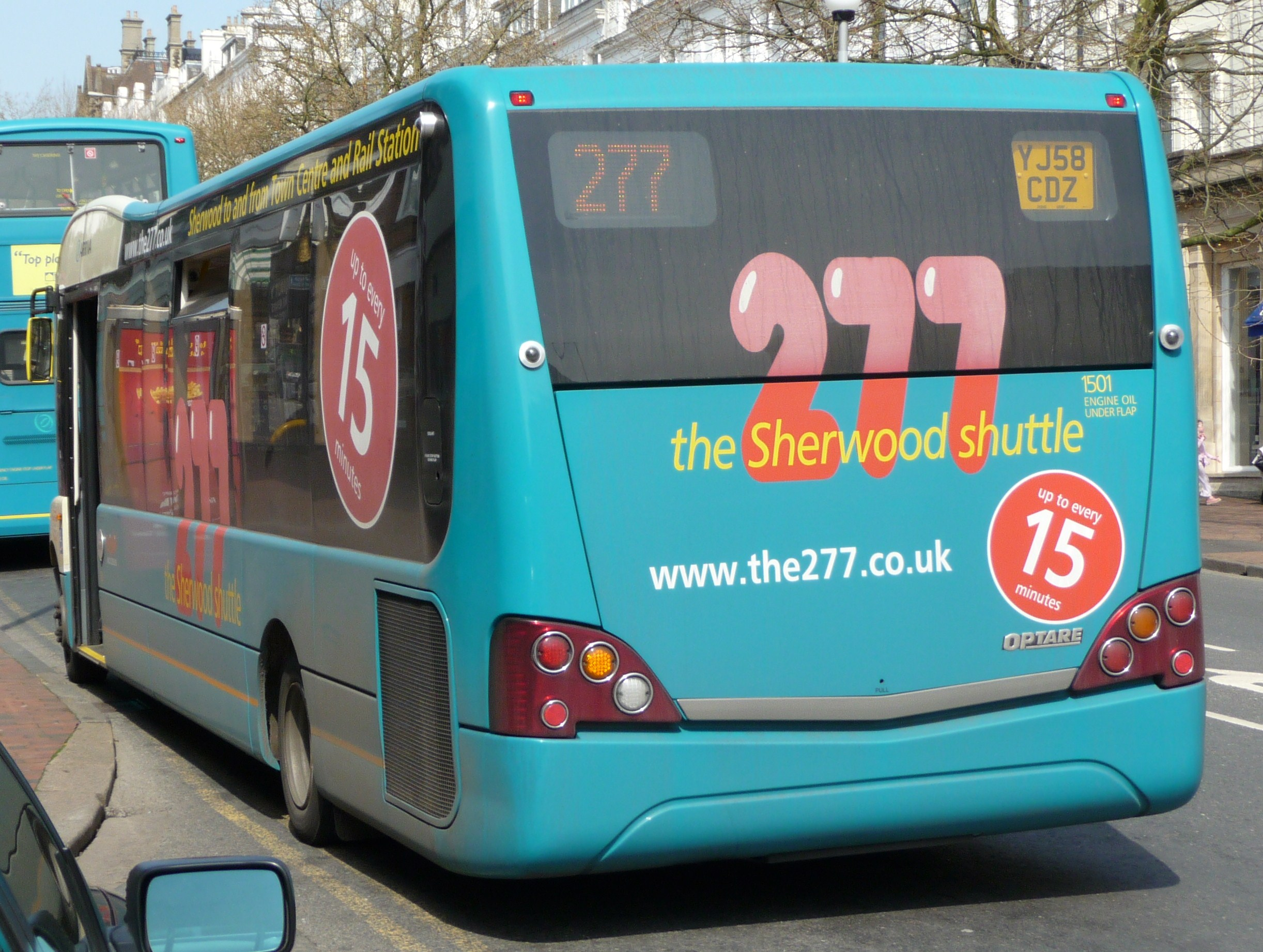
Arriva Kent & Sussex Solo SR rear in Tunbridge Wells in April 2009

In October 2007, Optare unveiled the Solo SR at the Coach & Bus Show. It is a completely-restyled version of the Solo drawing styling features from the Versa, such as the curved side windows and sweeping roof (with the destination screen and air conditioning unit underneath). Some features of the Solo such as the curved front windscreen and the unusual chassis layout, with the front wheels ahead of the doorway, were retained. Another new unusual feature to the Solo SR is the lack of a destination box on the standard model. However, Optare offers this as an option to individual customer specification.

In January 2012, Optare announced that the facelifted Solo SR would replace the standard Solo for both UK and export markets, with the original Solo design being withdrawn from sale.

The Solo SR was then available in 7.2 m, 7.9 m, 8.9 m and 9.6 m variants, all available in the Slimline (2.35 m wide) version. 8.9 m and 9.6 m models are available in the wider 2.5 m body width. All 2012 Solo SRs feature curved side glazing and high specification interiors allowing up to 37 seats in the longest derivative.

Some of the bodywork components had been redesigned to take advantage of the benefits achieved on the Tempo SR design, which reduced both weight and cost and further improved fuel economy.

After having been stopped following Switch Mobility's repositioning towards manufacturing zero-emissions vehicles, production of conventional diesel Solo SRs was restarted in October 2023 when the Stagecoach Group announced the purchase of 70 buses, 60 of them being Euro VI diesel Solo SRs, to replace its older buses within the fleet. The first of these were delivered in mid-2024, with the order being increased to 118 SRs in July 2024; Solo SRs from this order were delivered to Stagecoach Cumbria & North Lancashire, Stagecoach Manchester for Bee Network franchised bus services, Stagecoach South for services in Andover, Stagecoach South Wales and Stagecoach West Scotland. Centrebus Group operator High Peak Buses additionally took delivery of two new SRs during August 2024.

=== Hybrid ===
The diesel-electric hybrid single-decker bus had room for 53 passengers; its configuration can be changed to provide seating for up to 34 passengers plus one wheelchair with additional standing room. Its peak power demands are met by batteries that are recharged on-board by the diesel generator.

=== EV ===
A battery electric variant of the Solo SR debuted in 2012. Equipped with a Enova Systems P120 electric drivetrain as well as a water-cooled 15.2 kW on-board charger capable of reaching full capacity in six hours, using dedicated charging this could be reduced to less than 2 hours but the caveat being it only charges to 90% using dedicated Chademo chargers. On board charging requires a 36A 3phase cable to feed into the chargers to provide 377V at 36A across 2x chargers. The batteries being a 26S2P in each pack. The first-generation electric Solo SR was fitted with a 100 kwh battery pack, giving a maximum range of 90 miles (140 km).

First-generation electric Solo SRs were commonly distributed across rural towns in Scotland with funding from the Scottish Green Bus Fund, while a fleet of six electric Solo SRs delivered to Stagecoach Highlands in 2015 for services in Inverness received battery pack upgrades that saw their range increased to a total 130 miles (210 km).

Under Switch Mobility, the first six "next-generation" Solo SRs, with a maximum battery capacity of 135 kWh, were first delivered to Ulsterbus for use in Coleraine, with two of the six being allocated for Giant's Causeway shuttle services.

== Operators ==
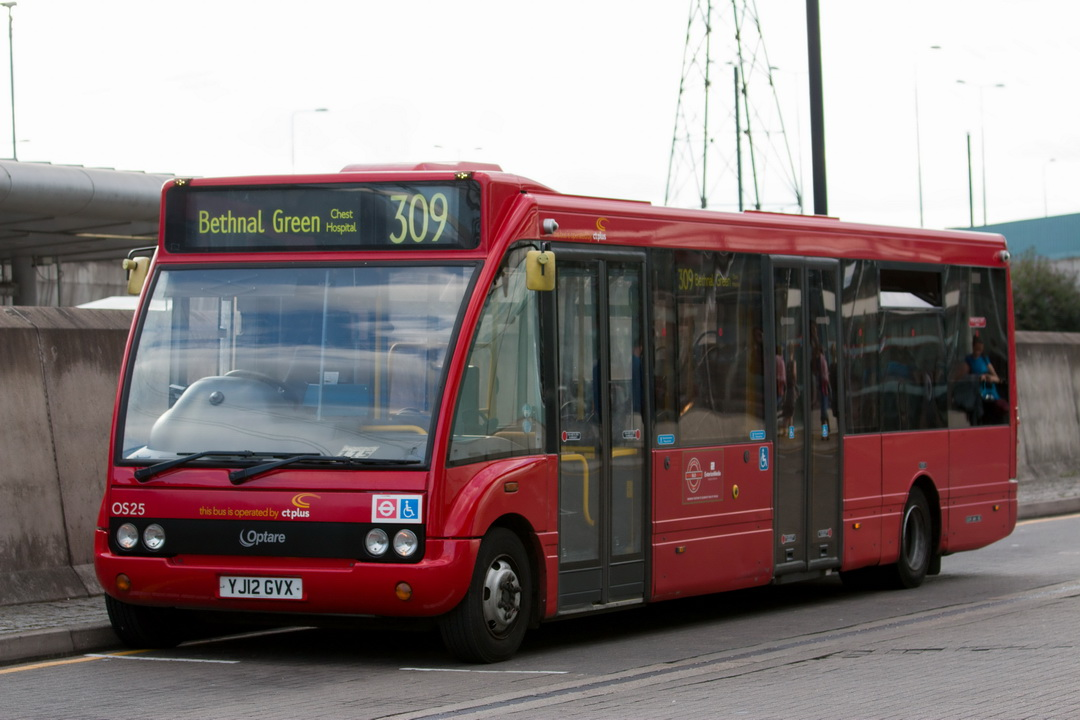
CT Plus Solo M960 in July 2014

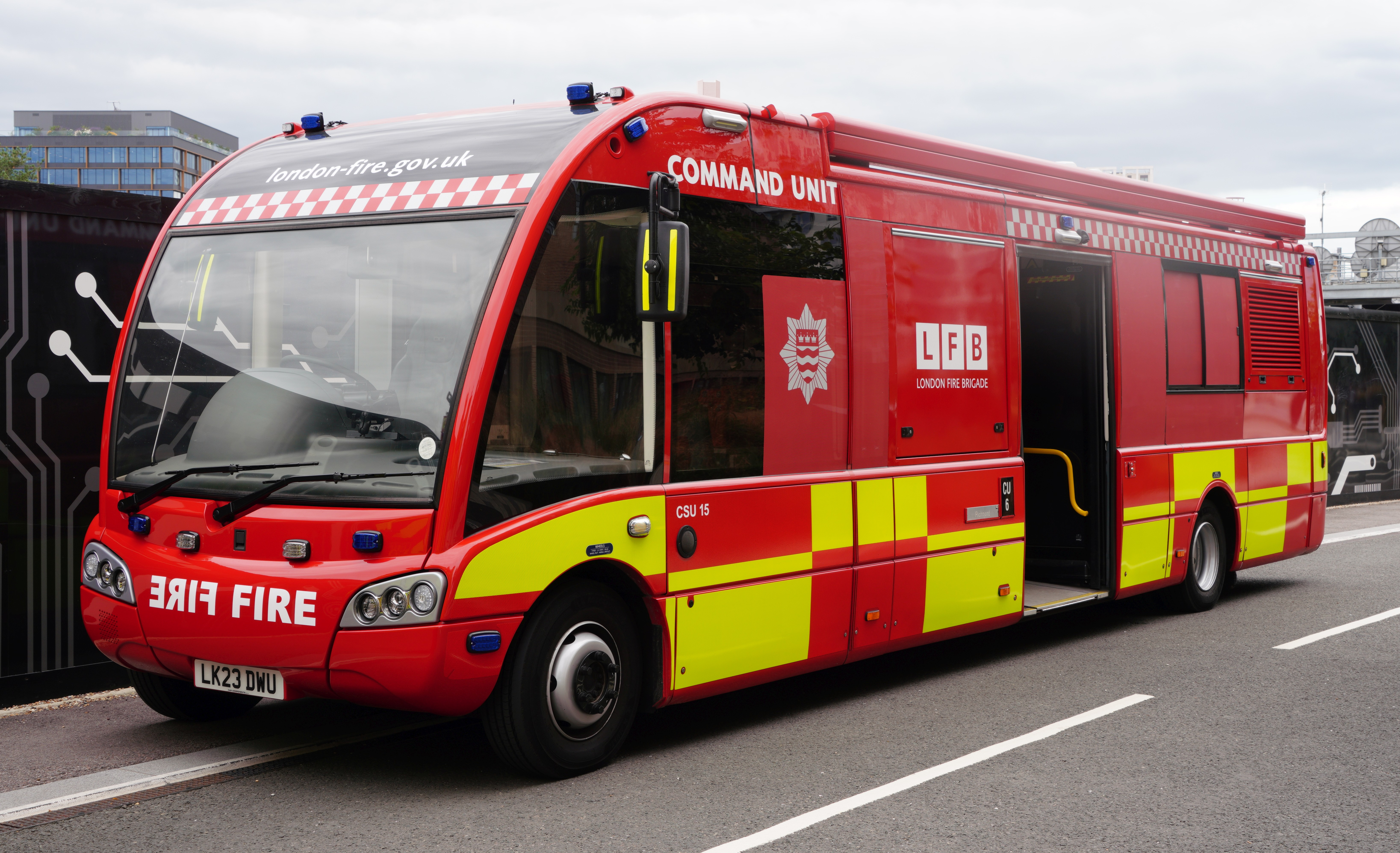
London Fire Brigade Solo SR M990 Command Unit in August 2024

=== United Kingdom ===
The first 32 production Optare Solos entered service in Poole in 1998 with Wilts & Dorset, with the operator eventually taking delivery of 85 Solos to replace its fleet of Optare MetroRiders. Arriva, FirstGroup, Go-Ahead Group, Stagecoach Group, Wellglade Group, Translink in Northern Ireland, and Travel West Midlands made subsequent orders, with all having operated large fleets. Solos have been operated by Transport for London operators Arriva London, Quality Line, Metrobus and Travel London. A fleet of 33 Solo SRs are also operated by LibertyBus in Jersey.

In 2024, the London Fire Brigade started operating nine Solo SR-based Command Units converted by Bence. The vehicles are sent to large incidents and provide a working space with computer equipment for coordinating the emergency response.

=== Malta ===
In 2011, Arriva Malta purchased ten Optare Solo Hybrids for some of its routes in Malta and Gozo. These were passed on to Malta Public Transport in early 2014 after Arriva pulled out from Maltese bus operations, but their use declined and, after summer 2015, they sporadically appeared in summer 2016 and summer 2017 before being withdrawn.

Between 2014 and 2015, Malta Public Transport leased 23 Optare Solo SRs from United Kingdom lessor Dawsonsrentals as temporary cover while a fleet of new Otokar buses were being manufactured. These buses were eventually returned to the United Kingdom off lease in September 2015.

=== Republic of Ireland ===
The Solo Slimline saw frequent use on local bus services from Bray, County Wicklow operated by Finnegan Bray, with further examples operated throughout the rest of Ireland by Bus Éireann.

=== Europe ===
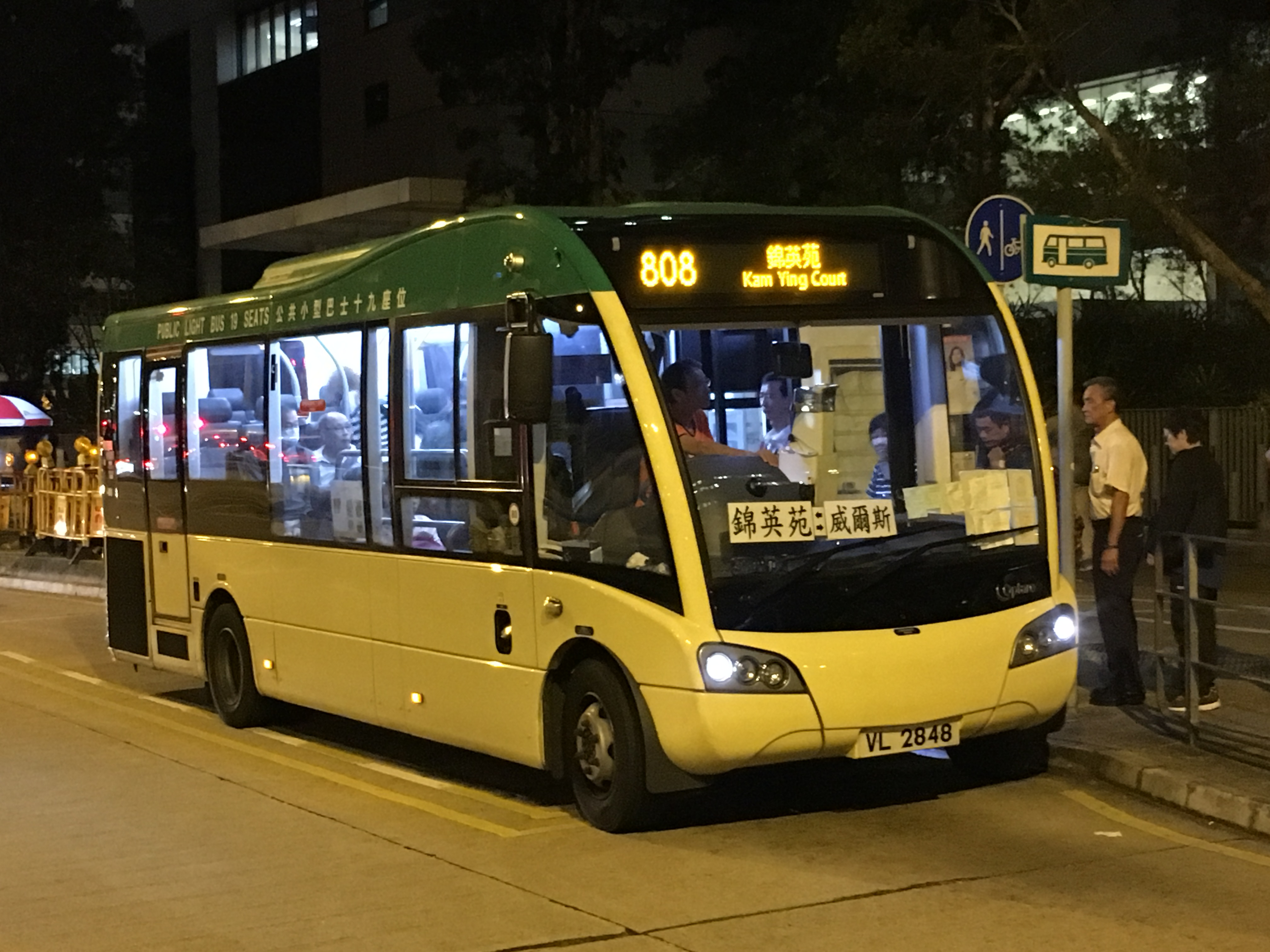
Optare Solo SR public light bus in Hong Kong

Netherlands operator Syntus purchased 25 Solos in 2010. In 2015, Solo EVs were delivered to Karlstad in Sweden. In Hungary, Kapos Volán bought one, which is operating in Siófok.

=== Asia ===
In Hong Kong, AMS Public Transport (Chinese: 進智公交) and Koon Wing Motor Limited (Chinese: 冠榮車行) respectively bought Optare Solo SRs in 2018 for trials on public light bus services, becoming the first low-floor public light buses operated in Hong Kong.

=== North America ===
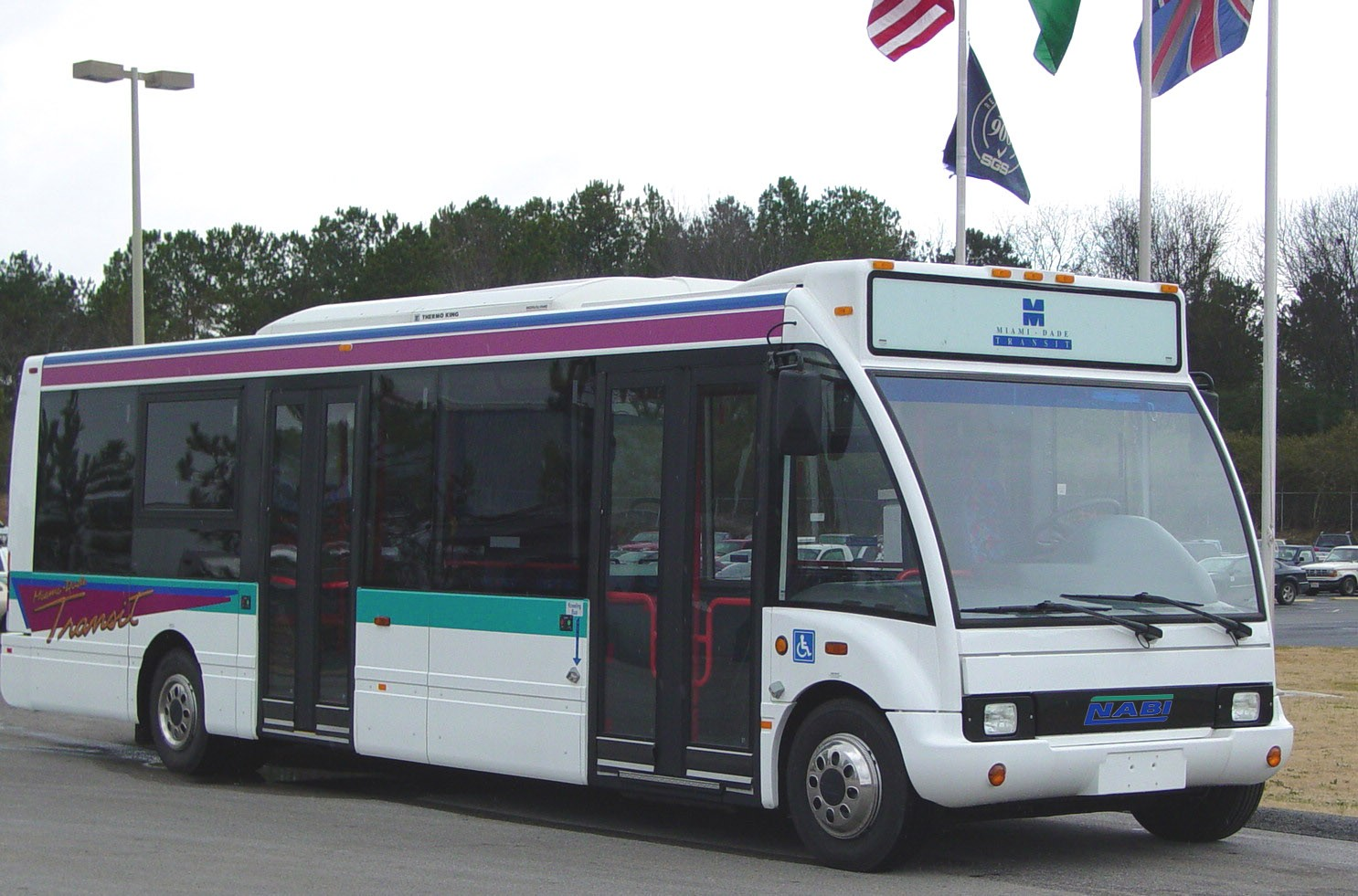
Miami-Dade County North American Bus Industries 30-LFN (2 doors) in May 2013

In the United States, a left hand drive version of the Solo was sold from 2003 to 2005 by North American Bus Industries (which at the time owned Optare) as the 30-LFN. Major purchasers were American Eagle Airlines and Miami-Dade Transit. NABI's sale of Optare coupled with poor sales led to its discontinuation from the US bus market.

=== Middle East ===
In 2010, four Solos were purchased by Israeli operator Dan Bus Company.

A fleet of 94 air-conditioned Solo SRs were also purchased by the RTA in Dubai in 2018.

=== South Africa ===
In 2012, Optare began delivering the first of 190 Solo SRs for Cape Town's MyCiTi bus rapid transit system. These were supplied as knock-down kits and assembled locally, entering service in the city from March 2013.

=== Australia ===
In New Zealand, Reesby Buses imported nine Solo M880s to operate in Rotorua.

In Australia, Optare Solos have been purchased by SkyBus, Transdev Melbourne and Ventura Bus Lines in Melbourne and the Donric Group for school transport in Victoria, and Bus Queensland for services in Toowoomba and Hamilton Island.
