= Wellglade Group =

English Midlands transport group

- Founded: 1986
- Headquarters: Heanor
- Service area: Derbyshire; Leicestershire; Nottinghamshire; Staffordshire; South Yorkshire
- Service type: Bus, coach & tram services
- Fleet: circa. 500 buses 37 trams
- Operator: Derby Community Transport; High Peak Buses 50% Kinchbus; Littles Travel; Midland General; Nottingham Express Transit; Notts & Derby; TM Travel; Trentbarton

The Wellglade Group is a transport group operating bus and tram services in the English Midlands.

== History ==
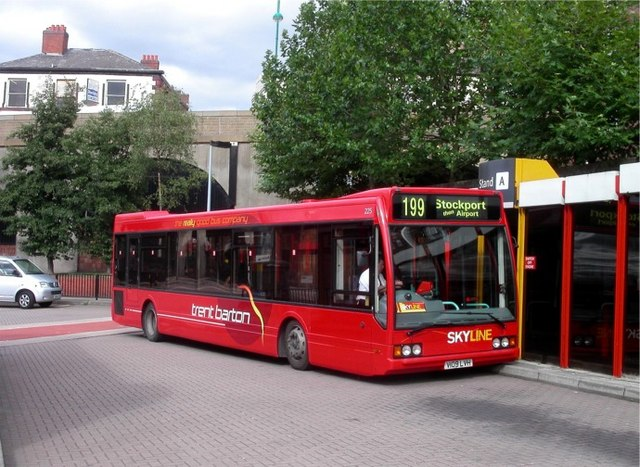
Trentbarton Optare Excel at Stockport bus station in August 2006

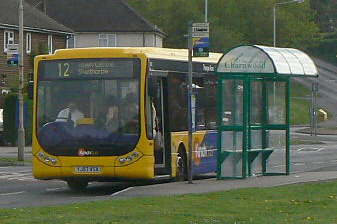
Kinchbus Optare Tempo in Loughborough in April 2011

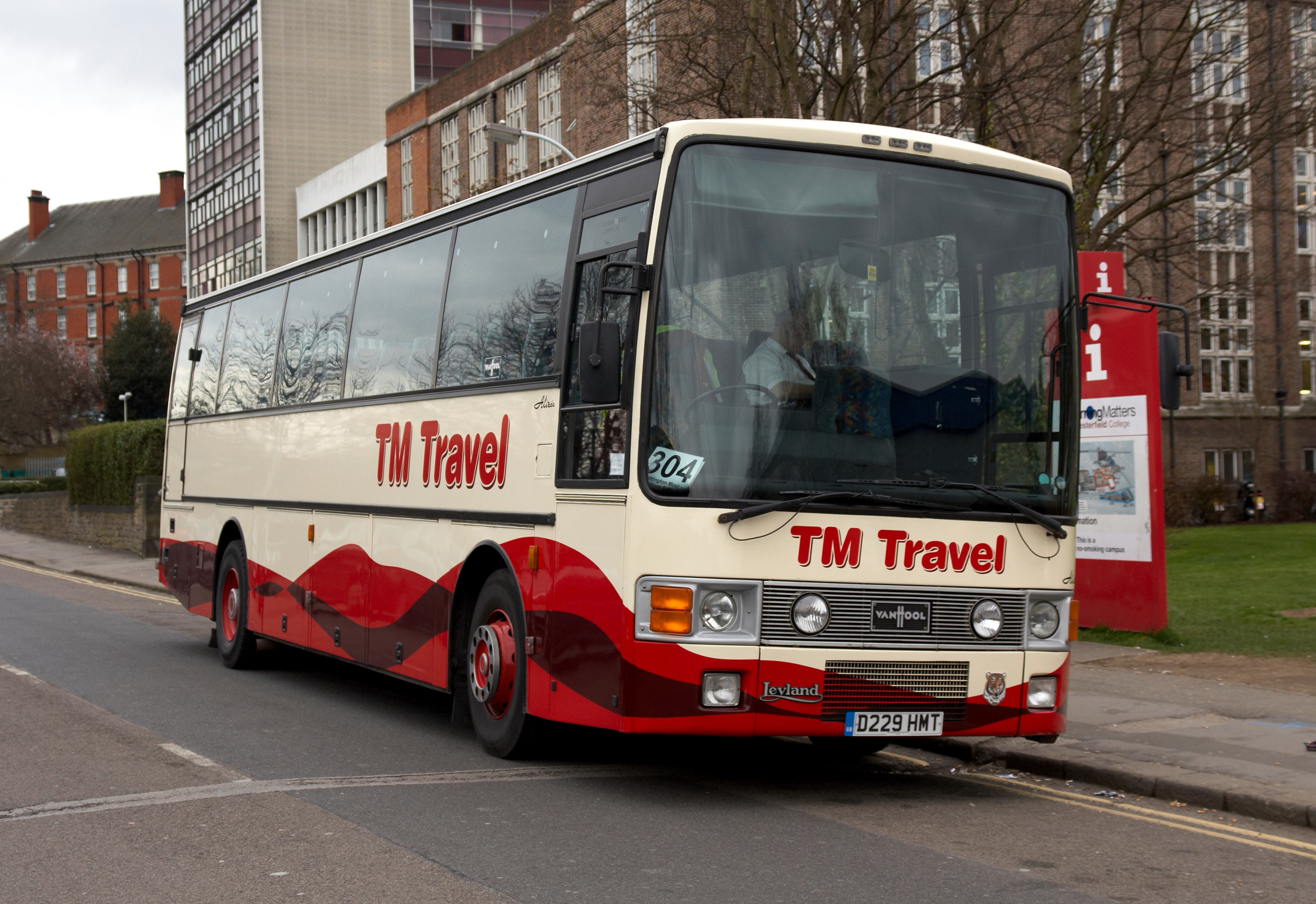
TM Travel Van Hool bodied Leyland Tiger in Chesterfield in March 2009

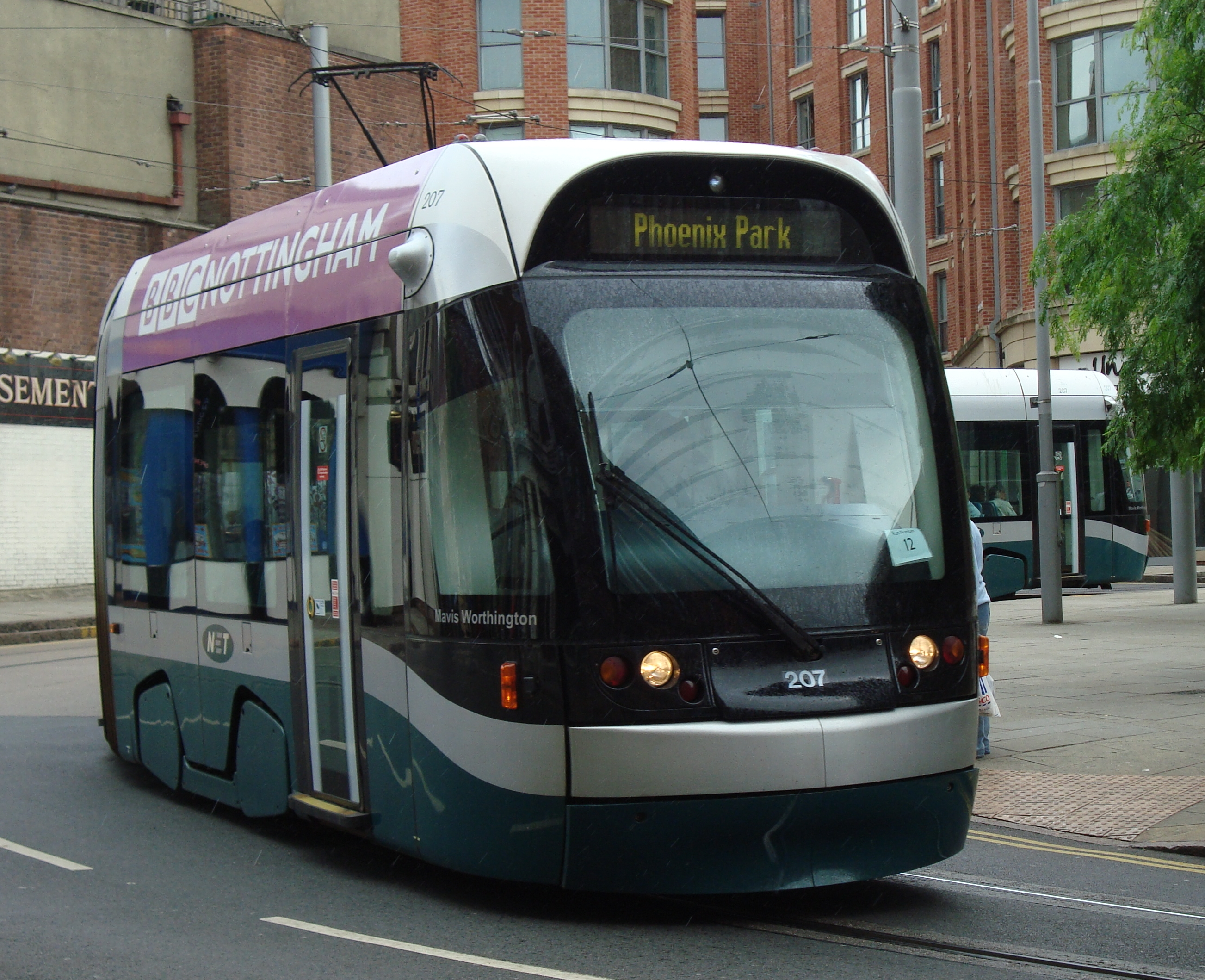
Nottingham Express Transit AT6/5 tram in Nottingham in July 2009

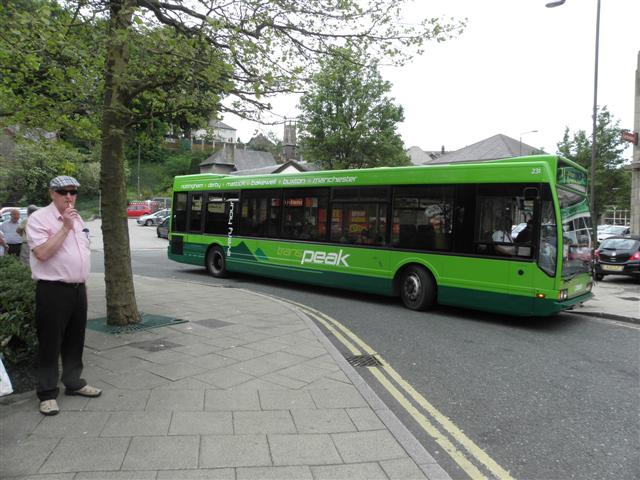
High Peak Buses Optare Excel in Buxton in May 2012

Wellglade was formed in 1986 when Brian King and Ian Morgan purchased Trent Buses from the National Bus Company in a management buyout. In 1989 the business of Barton Transport was purchased.

In 1998 Wellglade purchased the Kinchbus business in Loughborough. In January 2010 TM Travel of Sheffield was purchased. In January 2012 Wellglade took over the bus operations of Felix Bus Services.

In December 2011 Tramlink Nottingham took over the running of the Nottingham Express Transit tram network, as a 12.5% shareholder in the operating consortium. In April 2012 Centrebus Bowers Coaches operation and services operated from the Dove Holes depot of Wellglade's Trentbarton were combined to form High Peak Buses.

During September 2022, it was announced that current managing director Jeff Counsell will retire in February 2023 and will be succeeded by Tom Morgan who is the current commercial director for Wellglade Group.

== Subsidiaries and Interests ==
=== Current ===
==== Trentbarton ====
Trentbarton operates services from Bakewell in the north to Coalville in the south as well as Ashbourne, Burton upon Trent, Chesterfield, Derby, Ilkeston, Mansfield, and Nottingham. It was formed when the Trent Buses and Barton Transport operations were merged.

==== Kinchbus ====
Kinchbus is a bus operator based in Loughborough. It was originally an independent company established by Gilbert and Janet Kinch.

Kinchbus operate some local services around Loughborough along with their Kinchbus2 route between Barrow-upon-Soar and Loughborough, Skylink from Leicester to Derby via Loughborough and East Midlands Airport.

Kinchbus use the slogan 'Loughborough's Finest' which is advertised across their fleet of buses. Following the collapse of Nottingham based Premiere Travel on 24 January 2013, Kinchbus reinstated their service 9 between Loughborough and Nottingham which was the first route to have the new refreshed version of the current livery and logo which have been in place since 2007.

==== Notts and Derby ====
Notts + Derby operates a small number of local bus services, school buses and contract and private hire work in Nottinghamshire and Derbyshire. They operate a fleet of vehicles, most of which previously operated with Trentbarton and Nottingham City Transport. They now use a substantial amount of Ex Lothian buses in more recent years.

==== TM Travel ====
TM Travel is a bus operator based in Halfway, Sheffield, operating bus services in South Yorkshire and Derbyshire. It was founded in 1995 as a family-owned operation with one bus. School bus services and National Express services were later introduced. The company moved into scheduled bus service operation in 1999, winning a contract from Derbyshire County Council. A local route in Bolsover was launched a year later. In 2004 TM Travel took over a route between Sheffield and Chesterfield previously run by Thompson Travel. A number of South Yorkshire Passenger Transport Executive contracts were won over the following few years and the fleet increased in size to over 100 vehicles, prompting a move from Chesterfield to Halfway. As of March 2008, TM Travel was the largest independent coach and bus operator in Derbyshire, employing 120 staff, with all operations (including maintaining the fleet of vehicles) handled in-house. TM Travel was acquired by Wellglade Group in January 2010. As of June 2026, the TM travel fleet consists of 46 buses, most of the fleet wears an allover red livery with company logos although a number of buses transferred from other Wellglade Group companies remain in their respective liveries

==== Nottingham Express Transit ====
In March 2011 the Tramlink Nottingham consortium which Wellglade holds a 12.5% shareholding in, was awarded the Nottingham Express Transit 2 contract by Nottingham City Council. In December 2011 Tramlink Nottingham took over the running of the tram network.

==== High Peak Buses ====
In April 2012, Centrebus and Trentbarton entered a 50/50 joint venture, which saw Centrebus owned Bowers Coaches and trentbarton's Buxton area services combined to form High Peak Buses based at the latter's Dove Holes depot.

Centrebus Group operate the day-to-day running of the combined operations.

==== Kleanline ====
Wellglade also owns cleaning service provider Kleanline.

==== Littles Travel ====
During November 2024, Wellglade Group acquired the business of Littles Travel based in Ilkeston, which will continue to operate as a separate entity to other Wellglade Group companies.

=== Former and Inactive Subsidiaries and Interests ===
==== First Leicester ====
Through the Trentbarton operations, Wellglade Group acquired a 6% shareholding of First Leicester in 1993, First Bus UK are the majority shareholder in the operations. During 2024, First Group purchased the Wellglade Group shareholding in Leicester CityBus ending the long standing shareholding.

==== Midland General ====
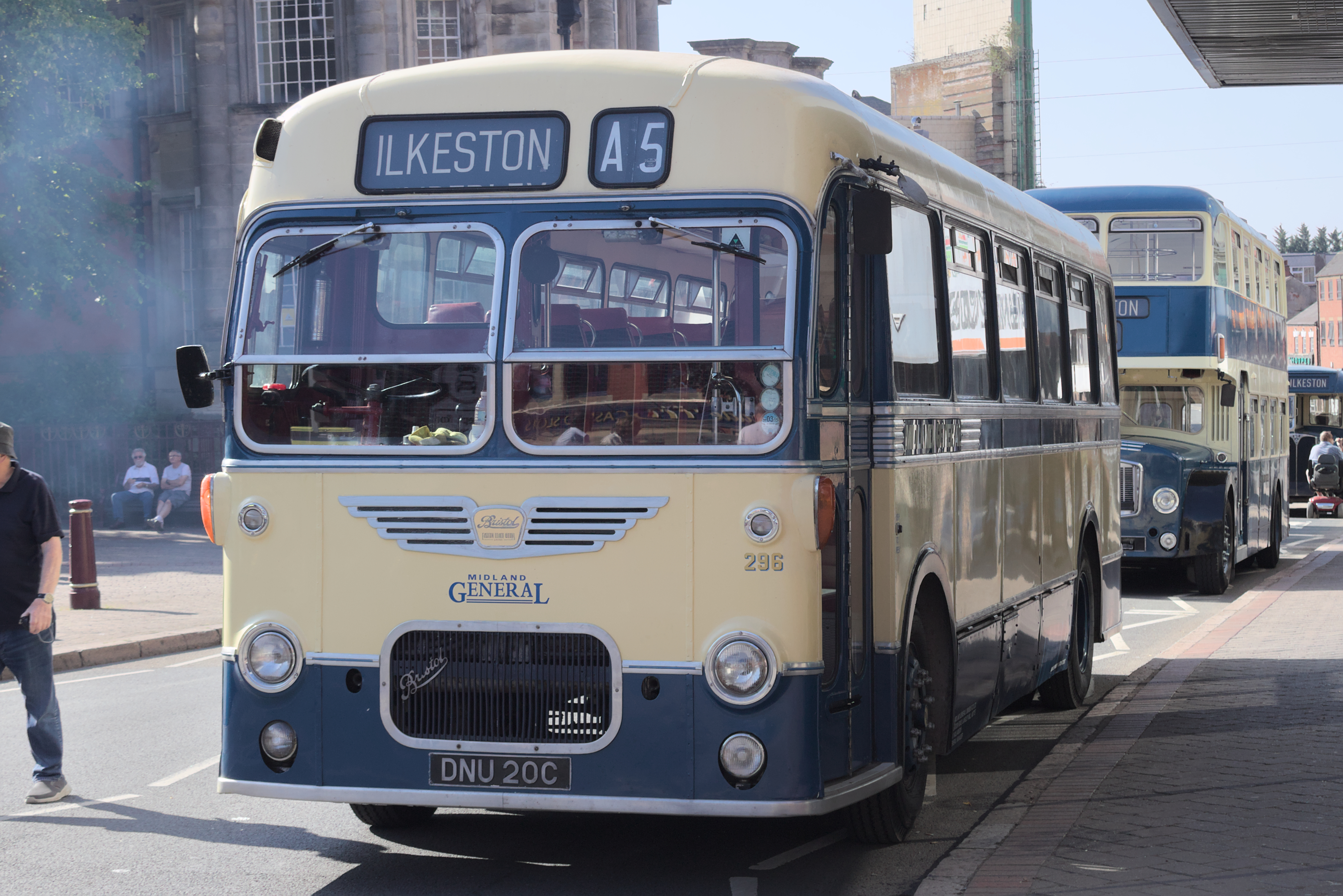
Midland General preserved Bristol bus on display at Ilkeston in August 2025

The Midland General Omnibus Company was incorporated in 1920 as a company in the Balfour Beatty group with a depot at Langley Mill. In 1972 the company's operations were merged with those of Trent and the Midland General fleetname ceased to be used.

The name was resurrected when Bargain Bus routes BB2 to Cotgrave and BB4 to Long Eaton were started in Nottingham in competition with Premiere Travel's services. These were withdrawn after Premiere Travel decided to withdraw their services.

The Black Cat and Ilkeston Flyer services acquired from Felix in January 2012 were to be operated by Midland General. In practice buses of the Notts + Derby fleet operated both services and the Midland General name has disappeared from the timetables.

==== Felix Bus Services ====
In January 2012 Wellglade purchased some assets from Felix Bus Services. Felix already shared two routes with Trentbarton, these being Black Cat and Ilkeston Flyer. Despite the appearance of the Midland General name in timetables, the former Felix journeys were operated by Notts + Derby.
