= Kimes Buses =

British bus company

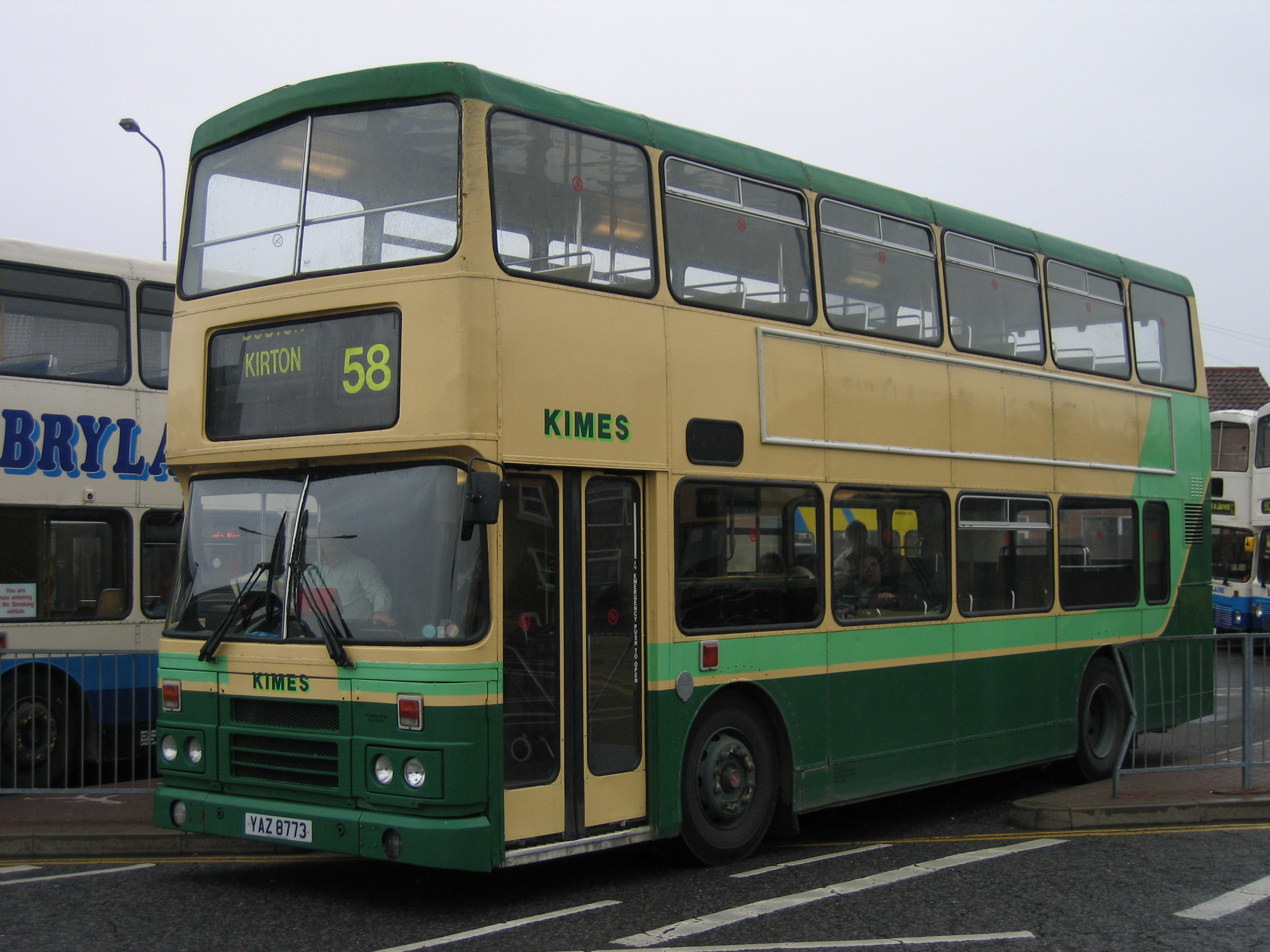
- Kimes Bus at Boston Bus Station
- Parent: Centrebus (2011–2013)
- Founded: 1946
- Defunct: 2013
- Headquarters: Folkingham
- Service area: Folkingham
- Service type: Bus services
- Website: https://web.archive.org/web/20110308075130/http://www.kimesbuses.co.uk/

Kimes Buses was a bus operator based in Folkingham, Lincolnshire, England.

== History ==
Kimes Bus Company was formed in 1946 by Richard Kime, when he purchased a transport business from Alfred King of 35 Market Place in Folkingham. The original routes ran to the surrounding towns of Sleaford, Bourne, Spalding, Boston, and Grantham. Between September 1949 and December 1956, the routes were extended to service RAF Folkingham. Kimes also inherited Holme Delight of Donington's stage carriage license. By 1970, a garage was established to the north of Sleaford Road, by 1988, Kimes had a fleet of 27 vehicles, of which 9 were double-decker buses. A significant part of the business was holiday coach tours, hence the name of the company at the time, Kimes Coaches.

In January 1997, the business was sold, and turned from a family business into a worker's co-operative, with Paul Brown as the manager. In December 2009, ice forced Kimes to cancel its services in the south of Lincolnshire. After the sudden death of Paul Brown in 2011, the company was sold to Centrebus, at which time it was operating 23 vehicles, and also operating services at Oakham and Peterborough. As Folkingham was only a small town, the viability of the depot was questioned, and it permanently closed at the end of August 2013, with most workers opting to continue working at new sites, however a small number were made redundant. The routes were taken over by Centrebus itself.

== Fleet ==
At its peak in 1988, Kimes had 27 vehicles. The livery was originally green and cream, however in the company's later years it became predominantly entirely cream. Kimes ran many Leyland Olympian buses.
