= High Peak Buses =

Bus operator in England

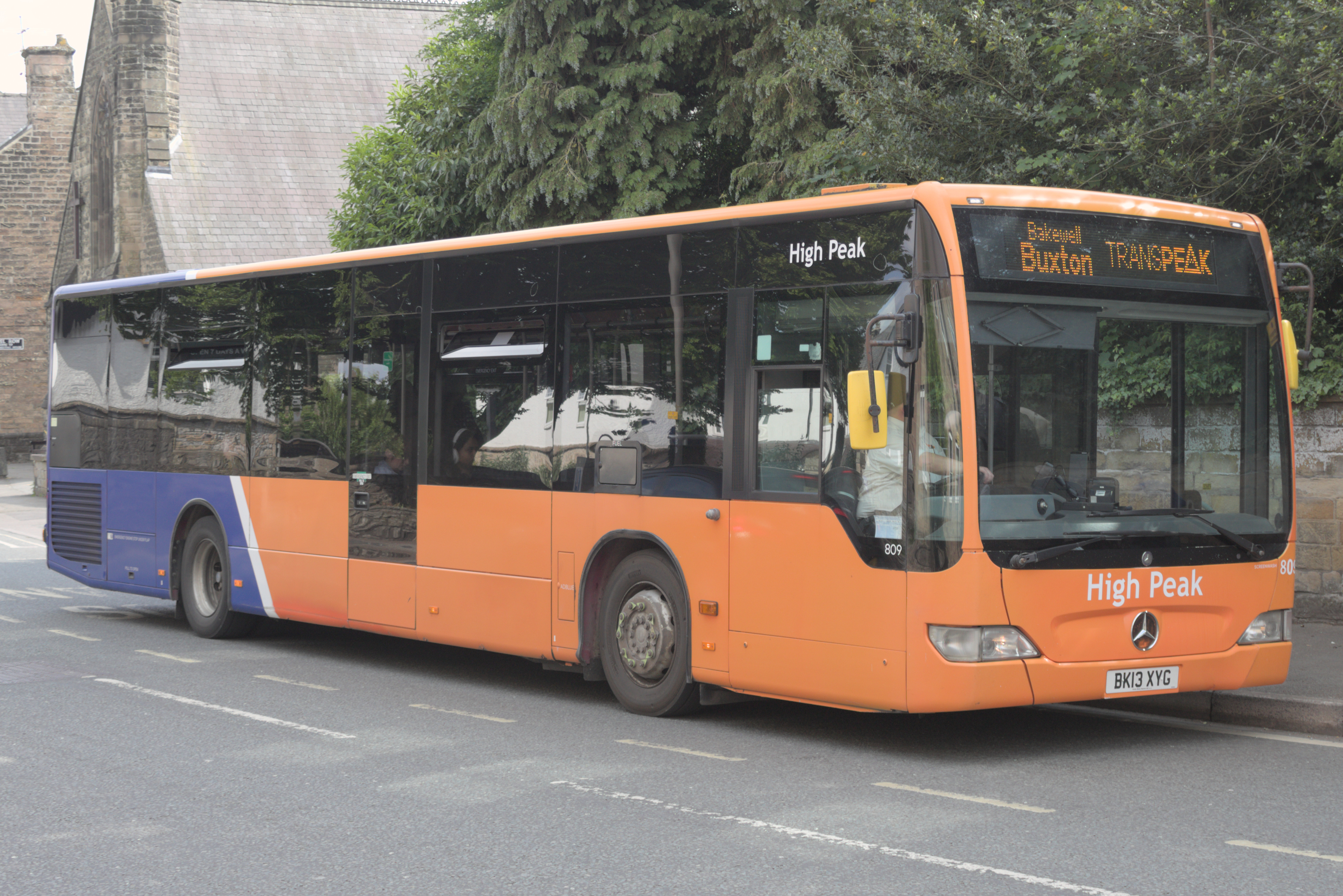
- Mercedes-Benz Citaro on Transpeak at Bakewell in June 2025
- Parent: Centrebus Group (50%); Wellglade Group (50%)
- Founded: 1 April 2012
- Headquarters: Dove Holes
- Service area: Derbyshire; Greater Manchester; High Peak; South Yorkshire
- Service type: Bus services
- Routes: 24 (April 2025)
- Destinations: Ashbourne, Buxton, Derby, Glossop, Hyde, Macclesfield, Manchester, Manchester Airport, Marple, Stockport, Hazel Grove, Sheffield
- Depots: 2
- Fleet: 45 (April 2025)
- Fuel type: Diesel
- Operator: Centrebus Group
- Website: highpeakbuses.com

High Peak Buses Limited is a bus company based in Dove Holes, Derbyshire, formed in 2012. It operates a mixture of local and long-distance commercial and subsidised public bus services in and around the Borough of High Peak, after which it is named. Services in the Alfreton and Matlock areas are operated under the Hulleys brand.

== History ==
In April 2012, Centrebus and Wellglade Group entered a 50/50 joint venture. This saw Bowers Coaches and Trentbarton's Buxton operations combined based at the latter's Dove Holes depot.

== Services ==
High Peak operates all services previously run by Bowers Coaches and the Buxton depot of Trentbarton, including:

- Skyline 199 service from Buxton to Stockport and Manchester Airport
- Transpeak from Buxton, Bakewell, Matlock then onto Belper & Derby,
- Other local services serve Glossop, New Mills, Whaley Bridge, Ashbourne and Marple.

== Fleet ==
Most of the fleet wears the Centrebus corporate livery, with the vehicles used on Skyline199 and Transpeak have their own dedicated liveries. Skyline199 has a dedicated fleet of mostly Enviro200 MMCs, while Transpeak now is a sole operation of 5 Mercedes Citaros. As of January 2026, the former TransPeak Enviro200s have transferred to Chaserider.

The Centrebus group continue to invest in its fleet, with the addition of five 2015 Mercedes Citaro O295s in early 2026, formerly at Blackpool Transport.

== Depots ==
High Peak has a fleet of around 50 vehicles all based at the former Trentbarton depot in Dove Holes and employs over 100 people. High Peak opened a Depot at the former Hulleys depot at Baslow.

== Gallery ==
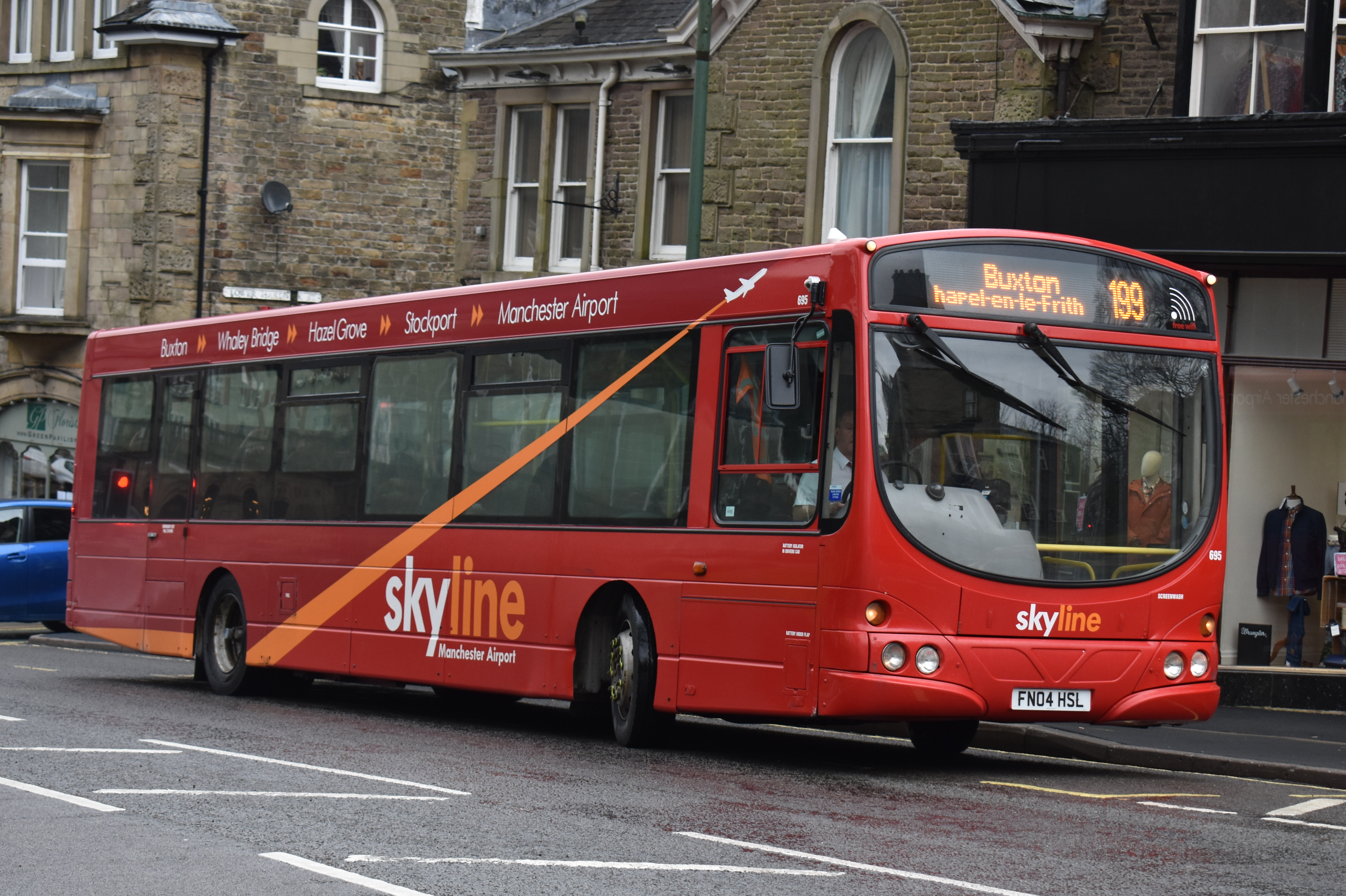
Wright Solar on Skyline 199 at Buxton in April 2018

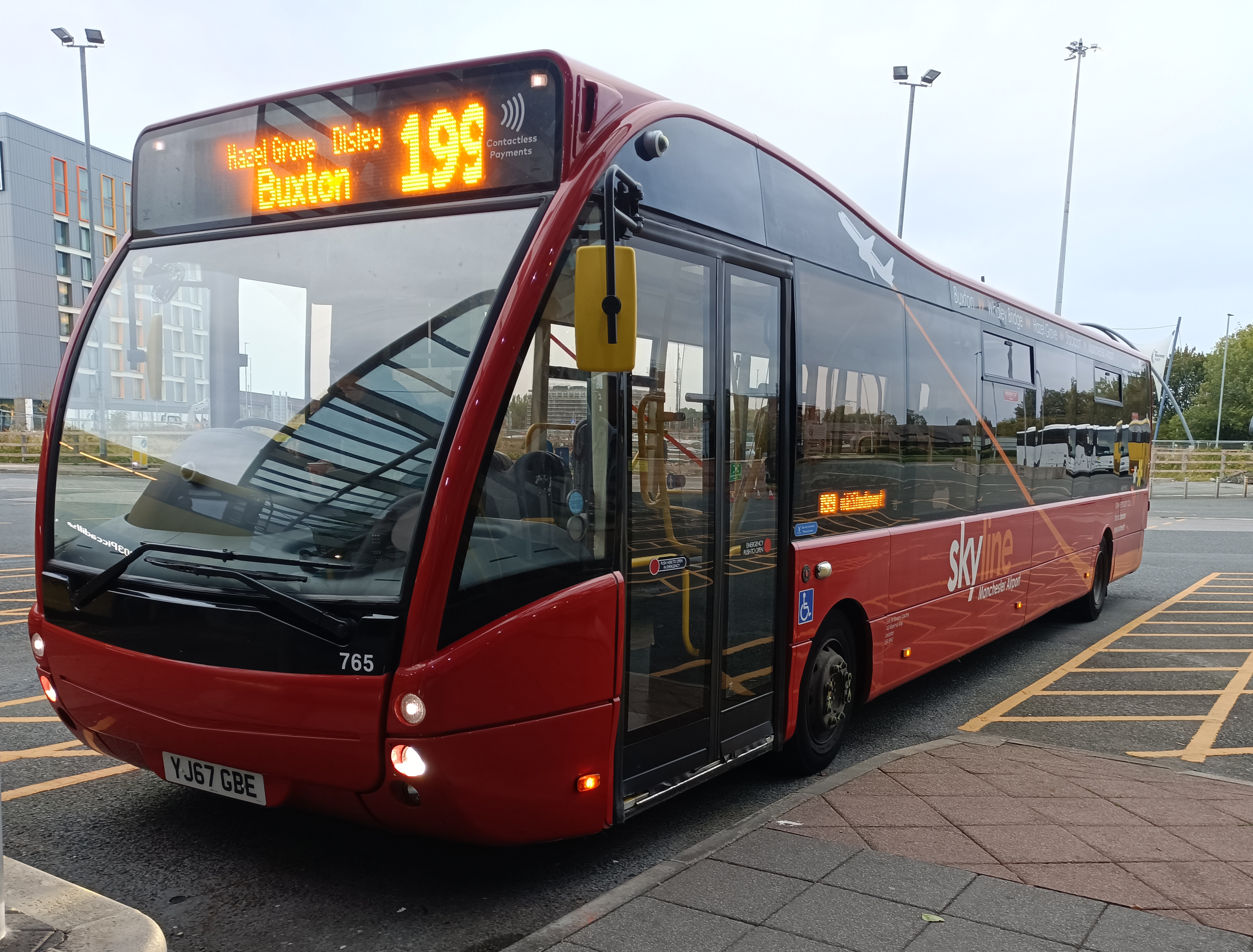
Optare Versa on Skyline 199 at Manchester Airport in October 2025.

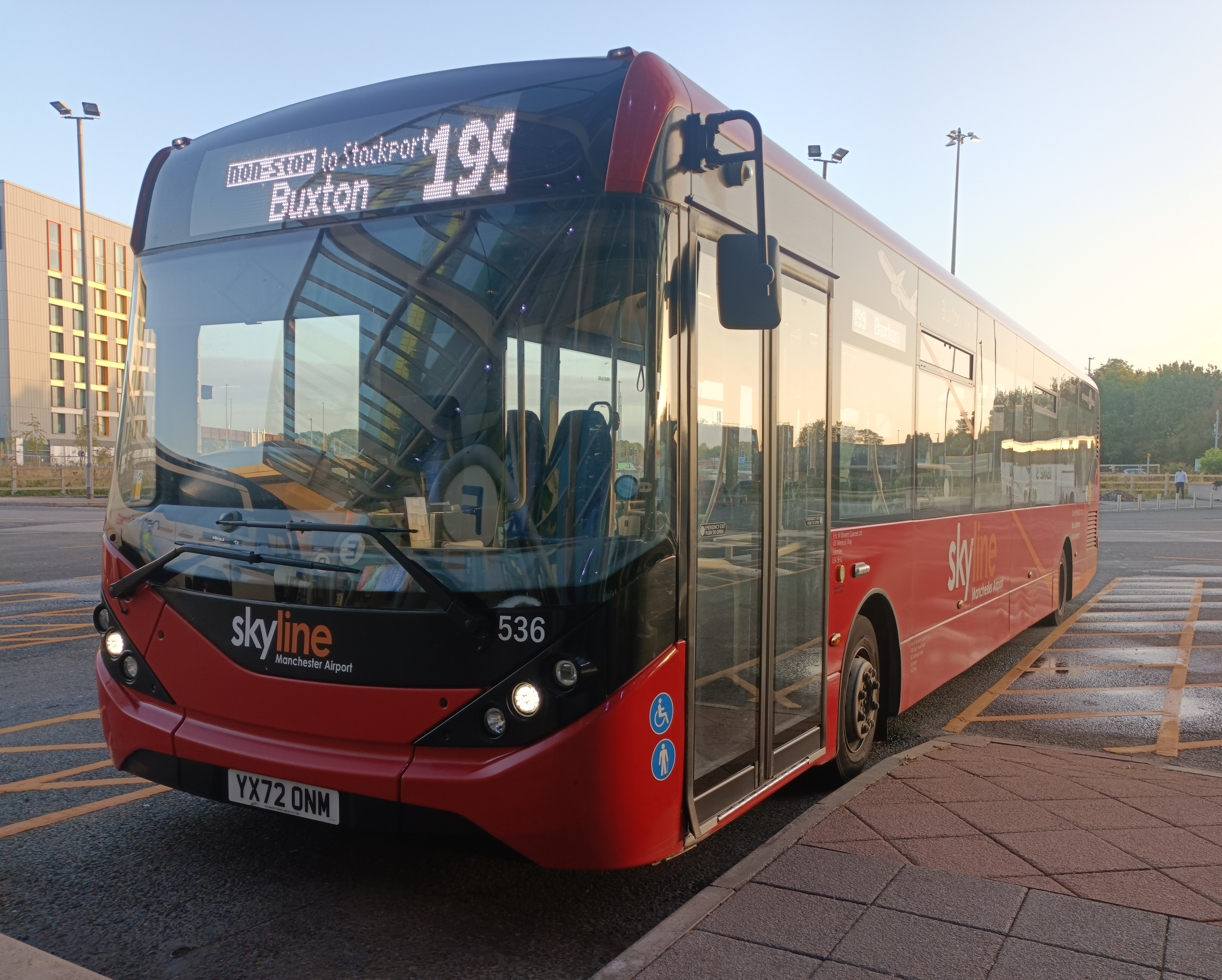
Alexander Dennis Enviro200 MMC at Manchester Airport in August 2025

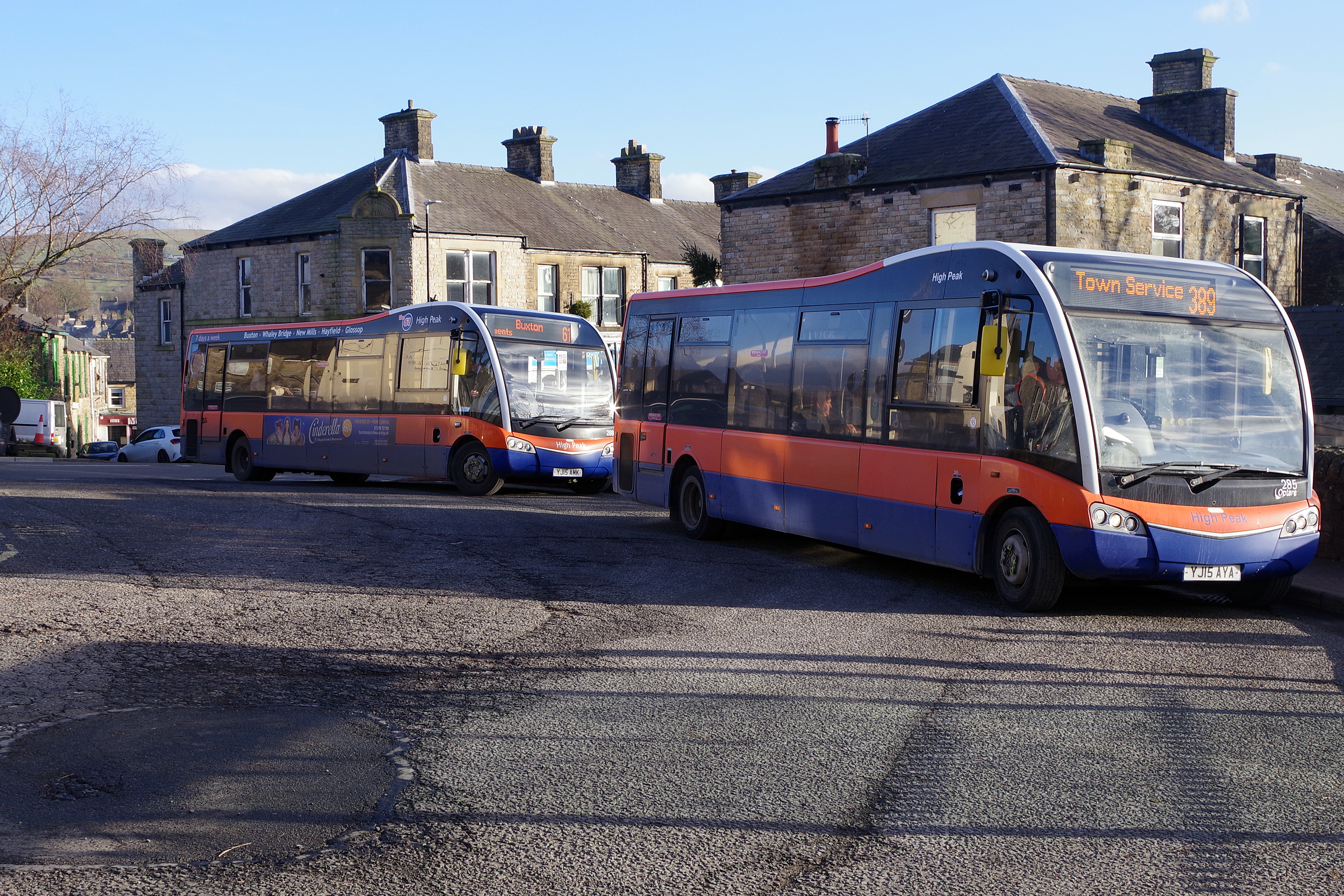
Two Optare Solo SRs at New Mills in January 2024

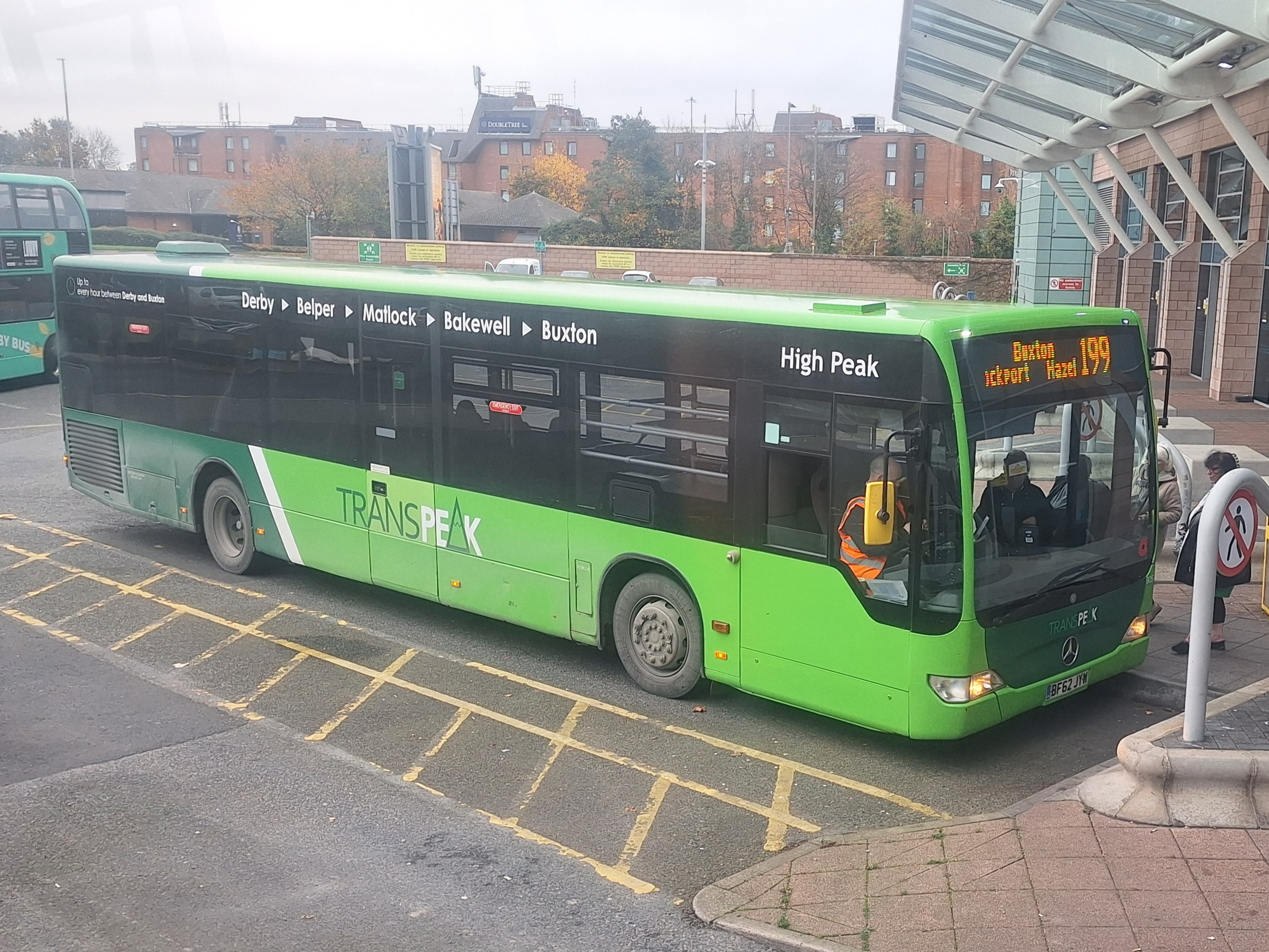
Mercedes-Benz Citaro 0.530 at Manchester Airport in November 2024

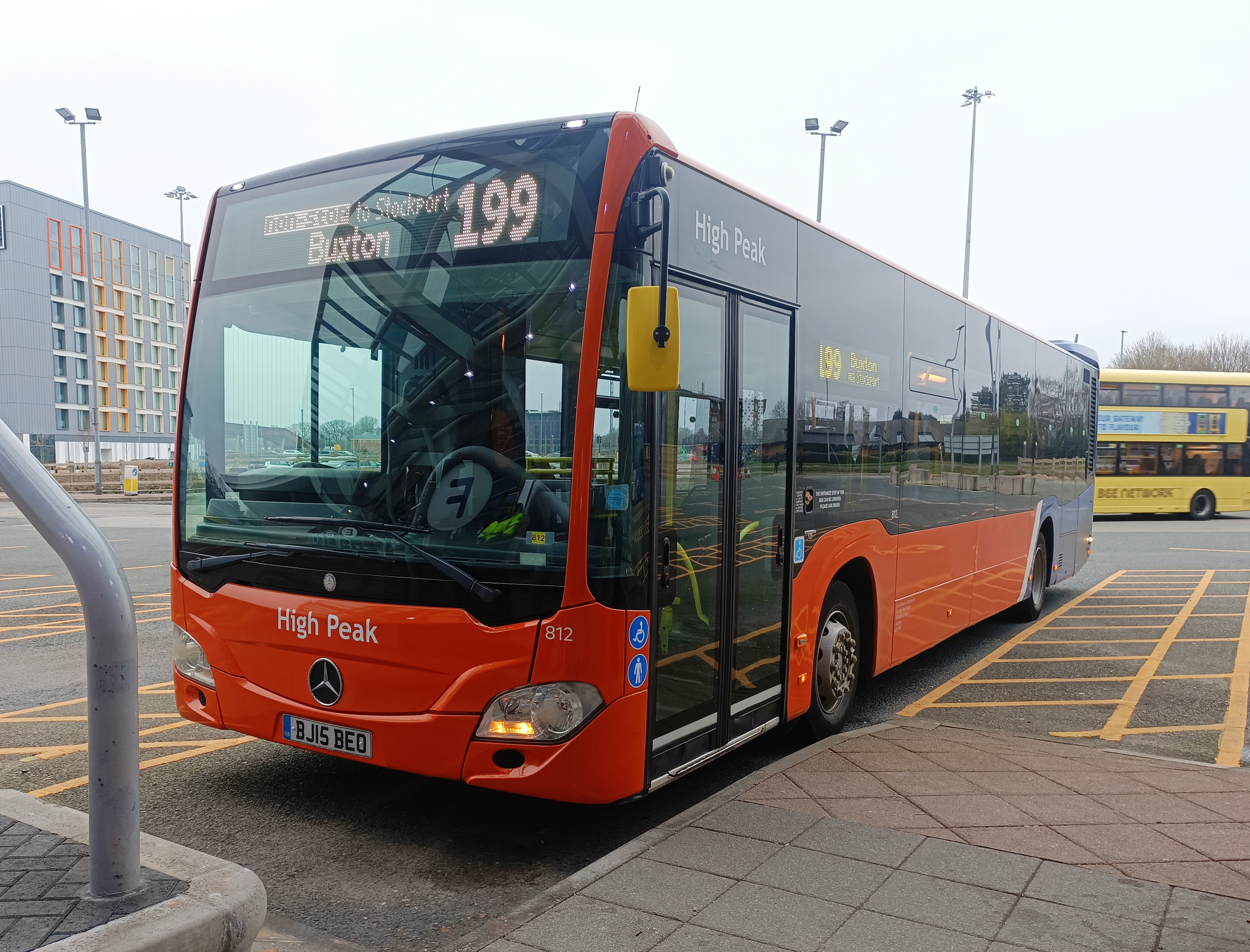
Mercedes-Benz Citaro 0.295 at Manchester Airport in March 2026
