= Dove Holes =

Village in Derbyshire, England

Coordinates: 53.300°N 1.889°W

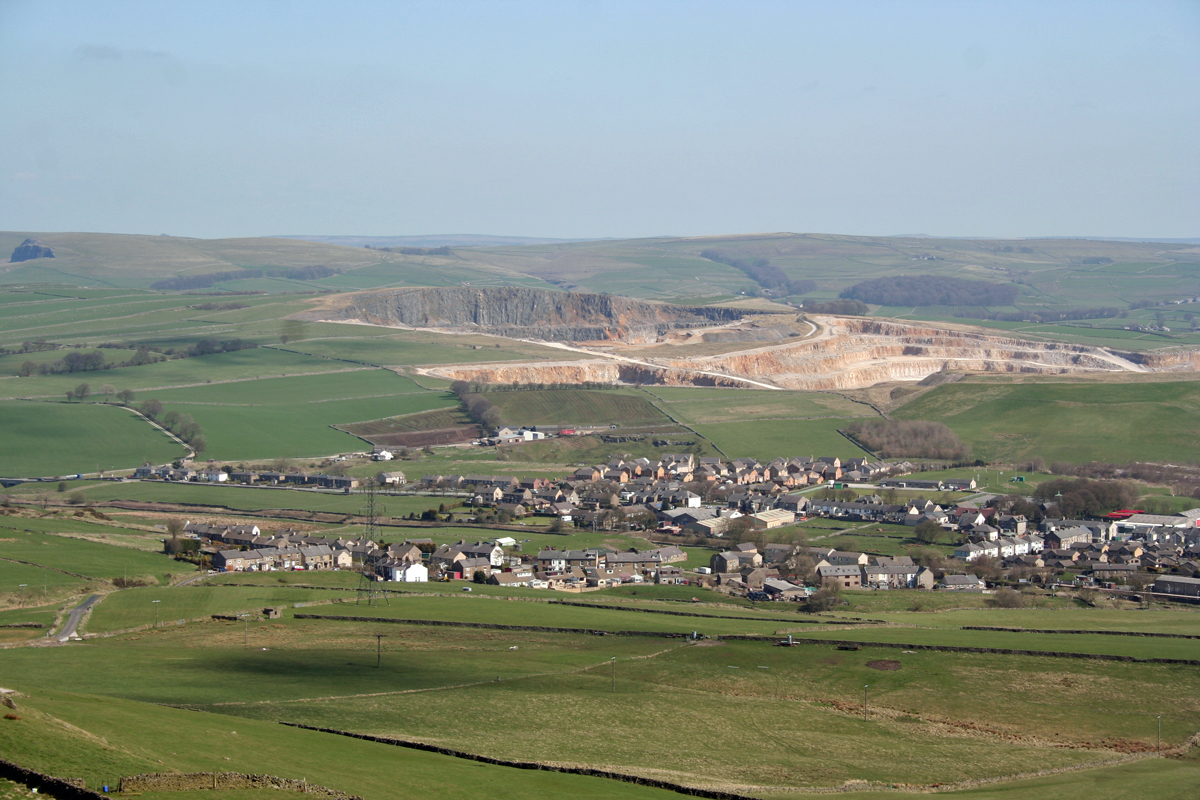
- Dove Holes from Combs Moss

- Location within Derbyshire
- OS grid reference: SK074781
- Civil parish: Chapel-en-le-Frith
- District: High Peak
- Shire county: Derbyshire
- Region: East Midlands
- Country: England
- Sovereign state: United Kingdom
- Post town: BUXTON
- Postcode district: SK17
- Dialling code: 01298
- Police: Derbyshire
- Fire: Derbyshire
- Ambulance: East Midlands
- UK Parliament: High Peak

Dove Holes is a village in the High Peak district of Derbyshire, England. It has a population of about 1,200 (2001), shown in the 2011 Census as being included in the population of Chapel-en-le-Frith. It straddles the A6 road, approximately three miles north of Buxton and three miles south of Chapel-en-le-Frith.

== History ==
Evidence of human occupation at Dove Holes can be traced back to the Neolithic period (late Stone Age) because of the existence of a henge, known locally as The Bull Ring, and an adjoining tumulus. In the Middle Ages, the area was used as the royal hunting Forest of High Peak (now known as Peak Forest), an area set aside as a royal hunting forest. The village's name is believed to derive from the Celtic word dwfr (dŵr in modern Welsh), which means water, hence Water Holes or Dove Holes. The same word is the origin of the name Dover for the famous Channel ferry port.

In 1650, a General Survey of the Manor of High Peak was made to assess the property of the late King Charles. This recorded that people were burning limestone around the village and that there were 14 kilns thereabouts, the burnt lime (quicklime) being slaked and used by farmers to condition the soil in their fields. At that time, lime kilns could be built and demolished without authority.

With the coming of the Industrial Revolution, and the opening of the Peak Forest Tramway in 1796, the limestone quarries were commercialised. The first of these was at nearby Loads Knowl and others quickly followed along Dove Holes Dale. Undoubtedly, the opening of the tramway and the consequent expansion of commercial limestone quarries contributed greatly to the expansion of the village. For the first time, there was an outlet for limestone in Manchester via the tramway, Bugsworth Basin, the Peak Forest Canal and the Ashton Canal.

== Description ==
The village lies on the fringe of the Peak District National Park.

Residents live either in the village or on outlying farms. There are around six farms in the village and many more within the boundaries of the parish. There are also large limestone quarries that, over the years, have made an important contribution to the local economy.

Buxton Mountain Rescue Team has been based in Dove Holes since the 1970s. Their present base in the village was opened in 1990 by Diana, Princess of Wales.

== Amenities ==
There are two public houses, one of which offers accommodation. There is a daily milk delivery service and a mobile library every fortnight. There is a church, Methodist chapel and a community centre. Dove Holes Church of England Primary School is on Hallsteads and serves the village and surrounding area. With three classes, the school currently teaches just over forty pupils.

== Transport ==
Dove Holes railway station is a stop on the Buxton line. Northern Trains operates generally hourly services in each direction between Manchester Piccadilly, Stockport and Buxton.

High Peak Buses operates bus route 199, which provides a regular service between Buxton, New Mills, Stockport and Manchester Airport. There is a bus garage in the village.

The A6, which connects Carlisle in Cumbria with Luton in Bedfordshire, passes through Dove Holes; it connects the village with Stockport to the north-west and the Peak District to the south-east.

== In popular culture ==
In 2001, the village was voted the ugliest village in Britain in a BBC Radio 5 Live poll. However, the railway station was chosen in 2019 to feature in the music video for the chart-topping single "Someone You Loved" by singer Lewis Capaldi.
