= List of current bus operators of the United Kingdom =

This list is a structured list of current operators, for an alphabetically ordered index of current and former operators, see List of bus operators of the United Kingdom

This is a list of current bus and coach operators of the United Kingdom, including public transport, private hire and tour operators.

== Large groups ==
Most bus services in the United Kingdom are run by the Big Five, five large groups of companies which emerged in the 1990s from the consolidation of bus companies privatised in the 1980s. These groups are all focused on transport. Some of them also run rail services, express coach services and overseas transport companies.

They are:

- Arriva
  - See List of Arriva bus companies
- FirstGroup
  - See List of First UK bus companies
- Go-Ahead Group
  - See List of Go-Ahead bus companies
- Mobico Group
  - See List of Mobico Group UK bus companies
- Stagecoach Group
  - See List of Stagecoach UK bus companies

== Foreign-owned groups ==
A number of large foreign companies have entered the UK bus market, these include:

- ComfortDelGro
  - See ComfortDelGro UK bus companies
- RATPDev
  - See List of RATPDev companies
- Transdev
  - See List of Transdev UK bus companies

== Other bus groups ==
- Rotala
  - Diamond East Midlands
  - Diamond North West
  - Diamond South East
  - Diamond West Midlands
  - Hotel Hoppa
  - Preston Bus
- Centrebus
  - Centrebus
  - Chaserider
  - D&G Bus
  - High Peak Buses (formed in April 2012 between Trentbarton (Dove Holes Depot) and Centrebus)
- Wellglade Group
  - Kinchbus
  - Notts + Derby
  - TM Travel
  - Trentbarton

== Municipal operators ==
For a list of the remaining local-government owned bus companies see Municipal bus companies.

== London ==
In London, a variety of companies run buses under contract to London Buses. They are:

- companies owned by four of the 'Big Five':
  - Arriva London
  - Go-Ahead London (London Central, London General, Blue Triangle, Docklands Buses)
  - First Bus London (London Sovereign, London United)
  - Stagecoach London (East London, Selkent, Thameside)
- companies owned by other groups:
  - Transport UK Group (Transport UK London Bus)
  - ComfortDelGro (Metroline)
- independent operators:
  - Uno

== Northern Ireland ==
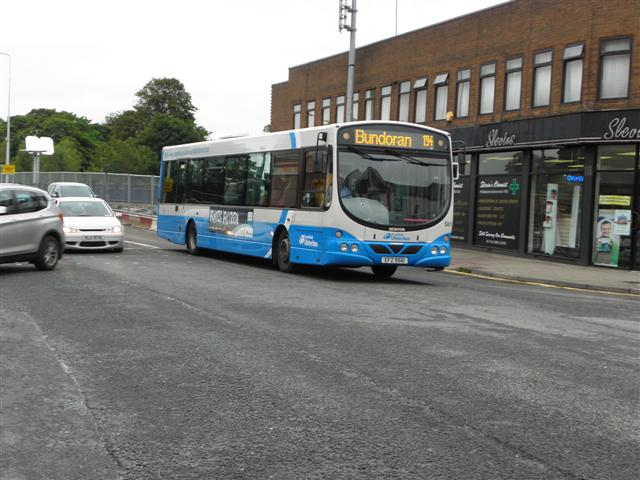
In Omagh with an Ulsterbus to Bundoran.

In Northern Ireland most bus services are operated by government-owned Translink through their subsidiaries:

- Foyle Metro
- Metro (formerly Citybus)
- Ulsterbus

Some cross-border services are operated by Bus Éireann.

== Independent companies ==
=== England ===
- Alba Coaches
- Bakers Dolphin
- Berrys Coaches
- The Big Lemon
- Bullocks Coaches
- Black Cat Travel
- Chalkwell Coaches
- Connect2Wiltshire
- Connexionsbuses
- Country Bus (Newton Abbot)
- Cumfybus
- Dales & District
- Delaine Buses
- Go-Coach
- Hatch Green Coaches
- Hodge's Coaches
- Hornsbys Bus & Coach
- Johnsons Coach & Bus Travel
- J.R Dent Bus & Coach
- Kirkby Lonsdale Coaches
- Leisuretime
- Lynx
- Mayne Coaches
- Minsterley Motors
- Mountain Goat
- NIBS Buses
- PC Coaches of Lincoln
- Quantock Motor Services
- Redwing Coaches
- Redline Buses
- Red Rose Travel
- Red Eagle Buses
- Safeguard Coaches
- Skills Coaches
- Southdown PSV
- South West Coaches
- Speciality Coach Hire
- Stephensons of Essex
- Sullivan Buses
- Star Travel Buses
- Thames Valley Buses
- Travel Express
- Trustybus
- Tates Travel
- Uno
- Whippet
- Wilfreda Beehive
- Xelabus
- York Pullman
- Z & S Transport

=== Scotland ===
- Bruce's Coaches
- Speciality Coach Hire
- McGill's Bus Services
  - McGill's Scotland East
  - Xplore Dundee
- West Coast Motors
  - Borders Buses
- Peter Hogg of Jedburgh
- Shiel Buses
- Shuttle Buses

=== Wales ===
- Leisuretime
- Edwards Coaches
- Lloyds Coaches
- Richards Brothers
- Tanat Valley Coaches

== Tour bus companies ==
- Big Bus Tours
- City Sightseeing
- Golden Tours
- The Original Tour

== Express coaches ==
UK express coach operators include:

- EasyBus
- FlixBus
- Green Line Coaches, part of Arriva
- National Express
- Parks Motor Group
- Scottish Citylink
- Ember
