= List of bus operators of the United Kingdom =

This list is an alphabetically ordered index of current and past operators. For a structured list of current operators, see List of current bus operators of the United Kingdom

This is a list of bus and coach operators of the United Kingdom. The list includes both current and historic entities, private companies and public operators, sub-brands and holding companies and public transport, private hire and tour operators.

Entries in italics are redirects.

== A ==
- Aberdeen Corporation Transport
- Abellio Surrey
- Aircoach
- Aldershot & District Traction
- Alder Valley
- W Alexander & Sons
- Anglian Bus
- Arriva Buses Wales
- Arriva Colchester
- Arriva Fox County
- Arriva Guildford & West Surrey
- Arriva Kent Thameside
- Arriva London
- Arriva Midlands
- Arriva North East
- Arriva North West
- Arriva Northumbria
- Arriva Shires & Essex
- Arriva Southend
- Arriva Southern Counties
- Arriva Yorkshire
- Avon Buses
- Ayrshire Bus Owners (A1 Service)

== B ==
- B&D Coaches
- Badgerline
- BakerBus
- Bakers Dolphin
- Barton Transport
- Bellairs & Dootson Coaches
- Big Bus Tours
- Birkenhead Transport
- Birmingham City Transport
- Birmingham Motor Traction
- The Blackburn Bus Company
- Blackpool Transport
- Blue Bus of North Lanarkshire
- Blue Bus of Penwortham
- Blue Triangle
- Bluestar
- Borders Buses
- Bowers Coaches
- BrightBus
- Brighton & Hove
- Bristol Omnibus Company
- Bristol Tramways & Carriage Company
- Bullocks Coaches
- Burnley Bus Company, The
- Buses of Somerset
- Busways Travel Services
- Bee Network

== C ==
- Cardiff Bus
- Caroleon Buses (operates service 19 in Walsall)
- Carousel Buses
- Carters Coach Services
- Central Scottish
- Central Connect
- Centrebus
- Chaserider (trading name of D&G Bus)
- Cheltenham and Gloucester Omnibus Company
- Cheltenham District Traction
- Clyde Fastlink
- Clydeside Scottish
- CMT Buses
- Compass Travel (West Sussex)
- Connect Buses
- Connect2Wiltshire
- Countywide Travel
- Coventry Corporation Transport
- Crawley Fastway
- Crosville Motor Services
- Crossgates Coaches (formerly Veolia Transport Cymru)
- CT4N
- Cumfybus

== D ==
- Dales & District
- Damory Coaches
- Delaine Buses
- Devon General
- D&G Bus
- Diamond East Midlands (formerly Midland Classic)
- Diamond North West
- Diamond South East
- Diamond West Midlands
- Docklands Buses
- Dot2Dot
- Dunn-Line

== E ==
- Ealing Community Transport
- East Kent Road Car Company
- East London
- East Yorkshire Motor Services
- Eastern Counties Omnibus Company
- East Midland Motor Services
- Eastern National Omnibus Company
- Eastern Scottish
- EasyBus
- Edwards Coaches
- Ensignbus
- Epsom Coaches
- Express Motors
- East Coast Buses

== F ==
- Falcon Coaches
- Fastrack
- Felix Bus Services
- Finglands Coachways
- Fife Scottish
- First Aberdeen
- First Beeline
- First Bus London
- First Cymru
- First Eastern Counties
- First Essex
- First Glasgow
- First Greater Manchester
- First Hampshire & Dorset
- First Leicester
- First Potteries
- First South West
  - Buses of Somerset
    - Somerset Passenger Solutions
  - Kernow
  - Truronian
- First South Yorkshire
- First Student UK
- First West of England
- First West Yorkshire
- First Worcester
- First York
- Fleet Buzz
- Flexibus
- Foyle Metro

== G ==
- GHA Coaches
- Glasgow Citybus
- Glenvale Transport
- Go Cornwall Bus (part of Go South West)
- Go Devon Bus (part of Go South West)
- Go North East
- Go North West
- Go South Coast
- Go-Ahead London
- Golden Tours
- Grampian Regional Transport
- Green Line Coaches
- Green Triangle Buses
- GWR road motor services

== H ==
- Halifax Joint Committee
- Halton Transport
- Hanson's Local Buses
- Hants & Dorset
- Harrogate Bus Company, The
- HCT Group
- Highland Scottish
- High Peak
- Holderness Area Rural Transport
- Hotel Hoppa
- Hulleys of Baslow

== I ==
- Invictaway
- Ipswich Buses

== J ==
- Jim Stones Coaches
- John Fishwick & Sons
- Johnsons Coach & Bus Travel
- Jolly Bus

== K ==
- Keighley Bus Company, The
- Kelvin Central Buses
- Kinchbus
- Konectbus
- Kirkby Lonsdale Coach Hire

== L ==
- Lancashire United Transport
- Leicester City Transport
- Leicester Citybus
- LinkUp
- Let's Go, trading name of Travel Express Ltd, Wolverhampton.
- Lloyds Coaches
- London Central
- London Country
- London Country North East
- London Country North West
- London Country South East
- London Country South West
- London Electrobus Company
- London General
- London General Omnibus Company
- London Pride Sightseeing
- London Sovereign
- London United
- Lothian Buses
- Lothian County
- Lowland Scottish
- Lucketts Travel
- Ludlows
- Lynx

== M ==
- Magic Bus
- Maidstone & District Motor Services
- Maidstone Corporation Transport
- Manchester Community Transport
- Mayne Coaches
- McGill's Bus Services
- McGill’s Midland Bluebird
- McGill's Scotland East
- Megabus
- Merseybus
- Metro (Belfast)
- Metrobus (South East England)
- Metroline
- Metroline Manchester
- Metroshuttle
- Metro Coastlines
- Midland Red
- Midland Fox
- Midland Red East
- Midland Red South
- Midland Red West
- Midland Scottish
- Minsterley Motors
- MK Metro
- Moss Motor Tours
- Mountain Goat
- Munro's of Jedburgh

== N ==
- National Express Coaches
- National Express Coventry
- National Express West Midlands
- National Welsh Omnibus Services
- New Enterprise Coaches
- New Forest Tour
- Newport Bus
- NIBS Buses
- Nippy Bus
- North Birmingham Busways
- North Western Road Car Company (1923)
- North Western Road Car Company (1986)
- Northern General
- Northern Scottish
- Nottingham City Transport
- Nottingham Express Transit
- NSL Buses
- Newbury & District (N&D)

== O ==
- Oban & District
- OK Motor Services
- Oxford Bus Company

== P ==
- Parks of Hamilton
- Pennine Blue
- Plymouth Citybus
- Premiere Travel
- Preston Bus
- Probus Management

== Q ==
- Quality Line
- Quantock Motor Services

== R ==
- Reading Buses
- Red & White Services
- Ribble Motor Services
- Richards Brothers
- Rhondda Transport Company
- Rosso
- Royal Mail Postbus

== S ==
- Safeguard Coaches
- Samuel Ledgard
- Sanders Coaches
- Scottish Bus Group
- Scottish Citylink
- Scottish Motor Traction
- Scottish Omnibuses
- Selkent
- Southampton Citybus
- South Gloucestershire Bus & Coach
- South Notts Bus Company
- South Wales Transport
- South West Coaches
- South Yorkshire Transport
- Southdown Motor Services
- Southdown PSV
- Southern National
- Southern Vectis
- Speciality Coach Hire
- Stagecoach East
- Stagecoach Grimsby-Cleethorpes
- Stagecoach in Eastbourne
- Stagecoach in Hastings
- Stagecoach in Hull
- Stagecoach in Lincolnshire
- Stagecoach in Mansfield
- Stagecoach in Warwickshire
- Stagecoach London
- Stagecoach Manchester
- Stagecoach Merseyside
- Stagecoach Norfolk
- Stagecoach North East
- Stagecoach Oxfordshire
- Stagecoach Sheffield
- Stagecoach South
- Stagecoach South East
- Stagecoach South Scotland
- Stagecoach South West
- Stagecoach South Wales
- Stagecoach Strathtay
- Stagecoach West
- Stagecoach Yorkshire
- Stephensons of Essex
- Strawberry
- Sullivan Buses
- Swansea Metro
- Swindon's Bus Company

== T ==
- Tanat Valley Coaches
- Team Pennine
- Tellings-Golden Miller
- Thames Travel
- Thames Valley Buses
- Thames Valley Traction
- The Big Lemon
- The Kings Ferry
- The Original Tour
- Thomas Tilling
- TM Travel
- Tourist Group
- Tower Transit
- Transdev Blazefield
- Translink (Northern Ireland)
- Transport UK London Bus
- Trathens Travel Services
- Travel de Courcey
- Travel Express
- Trentbarton
- Truronian
- Tates Travel

== U ==
- Ulsterbus
- United Automobile Services
- United Counties Omnibus
- United Welsh
- Uno

== V ==
- Vale of Llangollen Travel (t/a Vale Travel)
- Vision Bus

== W ==
- Wardle Transport
- Warrington's Own Buses
- Webberbus
- Wessex Bus
- West Coast Motors
- West Midlands Bus
- West Riding Automobile Company
- Western Greyhound
- Western National
- Western Scottish
- Western SMT
- Western Welsh
- Whippet Coaches
- Wilfreda Beehive
- Wilts & Dorset

== X ==
- Xelabus
- Xplore Dundee

== Y ==
- Yellow Bus Services
- Yellow Buses
- Yelloway Motor Services
- Yorkshire Coastliner
- Yorkshire Terrier
- Yorkshire Traction
