= Blue Bus of North Lanarkshire =

Blue Bus
- Founded: 2004
- Headquarters: Allanton
- Service area: North Lanarkshire
- Service type: Bus services
- Routes: 4
- Website: www.bluebuslimited.com

Blue Bus of North Lanarkshire, also known as Blue Bus of Shotts or Law of Shotts, is a bus operator primarily serving the area of Shotts, North Lanarkshire in West Scotland.

It is a mainly local bus operator, based at Allanton, but is also involved in private coach business. The company was formed from the remnants of the bankrupted HAD Coaches. Blue Bus operate a variety of services across central Scotland. As of January 2016 the company operates services on four routes between Lanarkshire and West Lothian. There routes restored links that had been lost since the privatisation of Scottish bus services.

Blue Bus operated a fleet of Plaxton Beaver 2s and Alexander Sprint bodied Mercedes-Benz 709Ds, However by the 2015 most of the fleet had been converted to Low floor operations

In 2010 the company said they had approached Strathclyde Partnership for Transport (SPT) asking for a route serving Torbothie, Shotts to be subsidised, but were told there was no funding available. The original service was to cease 6 May. Ultimately, however, Strathclyde Partnership for Transport agreed to subsidize the route and the route was replaced with new service 10 May 2010.

In October 2019, the company announced it would crease trading on the 20th December 2019, as the route were no longer commercially viable, stating it was due to the presence of Lothian Buses and First Bus.

== Public hearing ==
On the 26 October 2010, the company was fined £3,500, when the Vosa bus compliance officers noted the early and late running on a number of occasions. A driver was also found to have taken a bus out of service and stopped at his house for lunch, he was sacked the same day. Blue Bus will be appealing the decision of the Traffic Commissioner.

== See also ==
- List of bus operators of the United Kingdom
