= Strawberry (bus operator) =

Bus operator in the United Kingdom

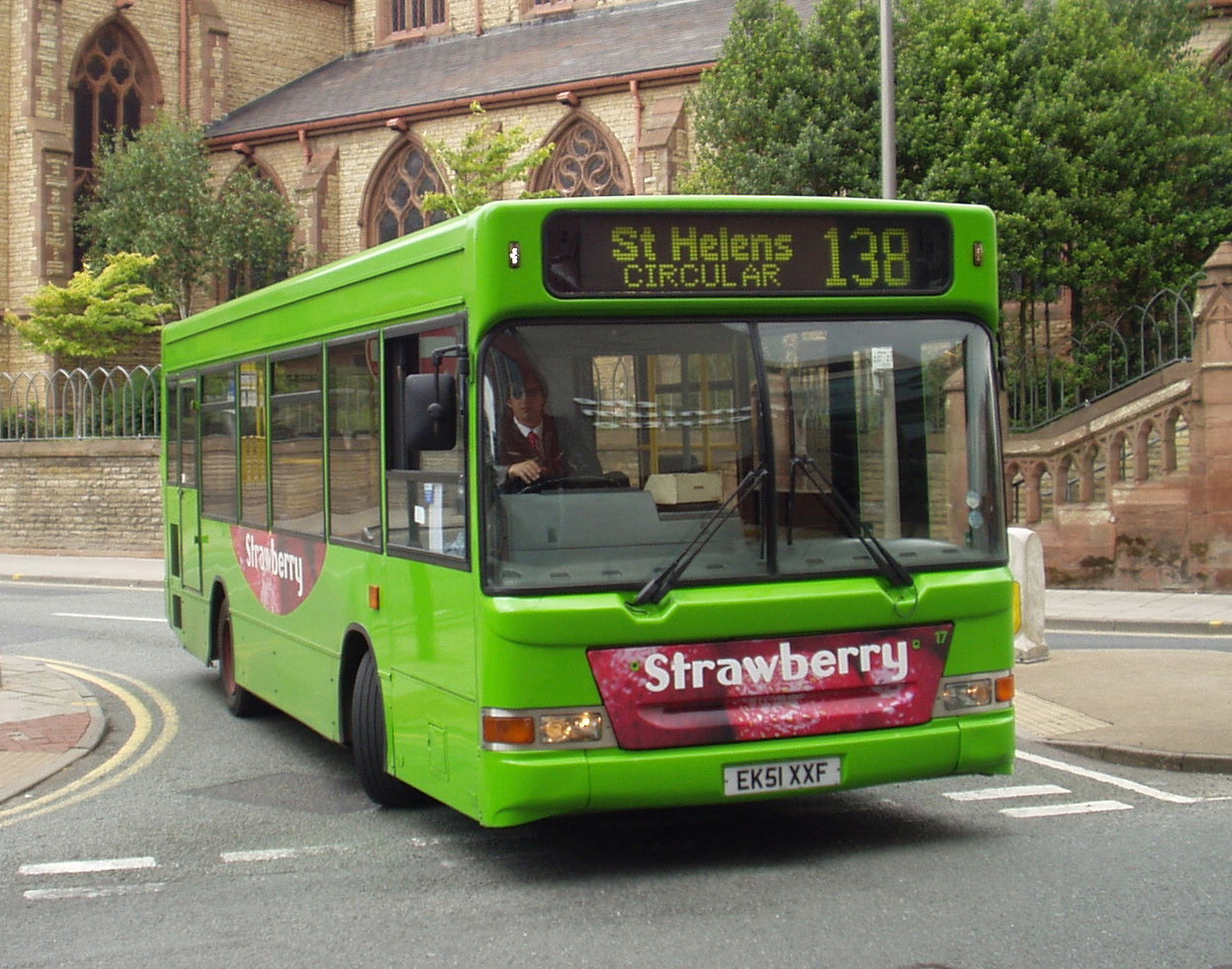
- Plaxton Pointer 2 bodied Dennis Dart MPD in St Helens
- Founded: 2009
- Service area: Greater Manchester, Merseyside
- Service type: Bus service
- Destinations: St Helens, Ormskirk
- Website: Strawberry Bus - Web Archive; South Lancs Travel website

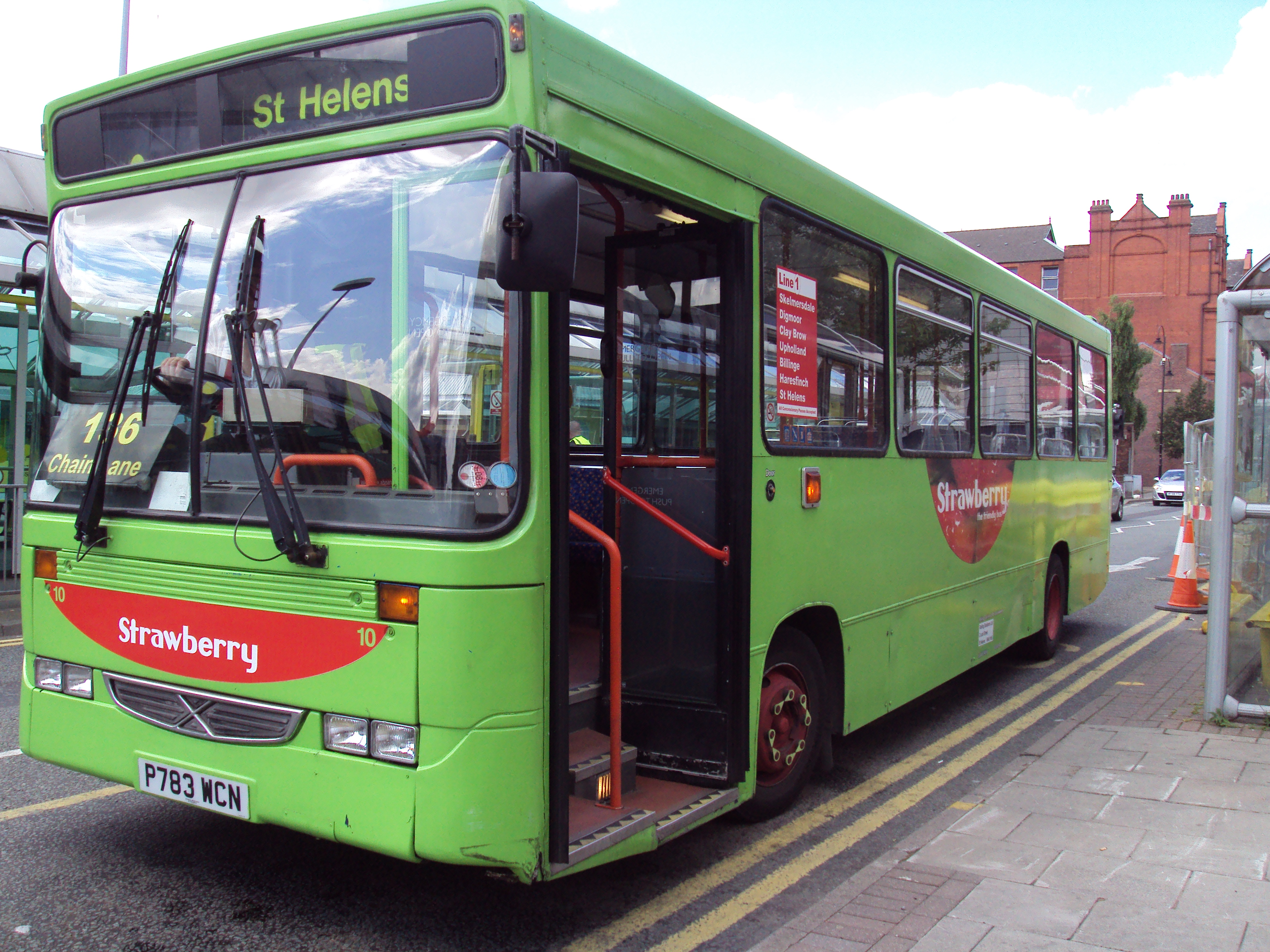
Alexander Dash bodied Volvo B6 in Merseyside.

Strawberry was a bus operator founded in 2009. It was initially based in St Helens, Merseyside.

== History ==
The company attracted attention by offering free rides for passengers with red hair for a period. By March 2010 it operated two routes, with a third planned. In February 2011 it was operating nine routes in addition to works and school services. Three months later it acquired another route, linking St Helens to Ormskirk.

In January 2012, Strawberry merged with South Lancs Travel and moved its operations to the larger operator's depot in Atherton. South Lancs Travel had itself been acquired by D&G Bus, which held shares in Strawberry, shortly before the merge. Strawberry's founder Oliver Howarth became joint operations director of the enlarged company.

== See also ==
- List of bus operators of the United Kingdom
