= Travel Express =

British bus operating company

Travel Express (Let's Go!)
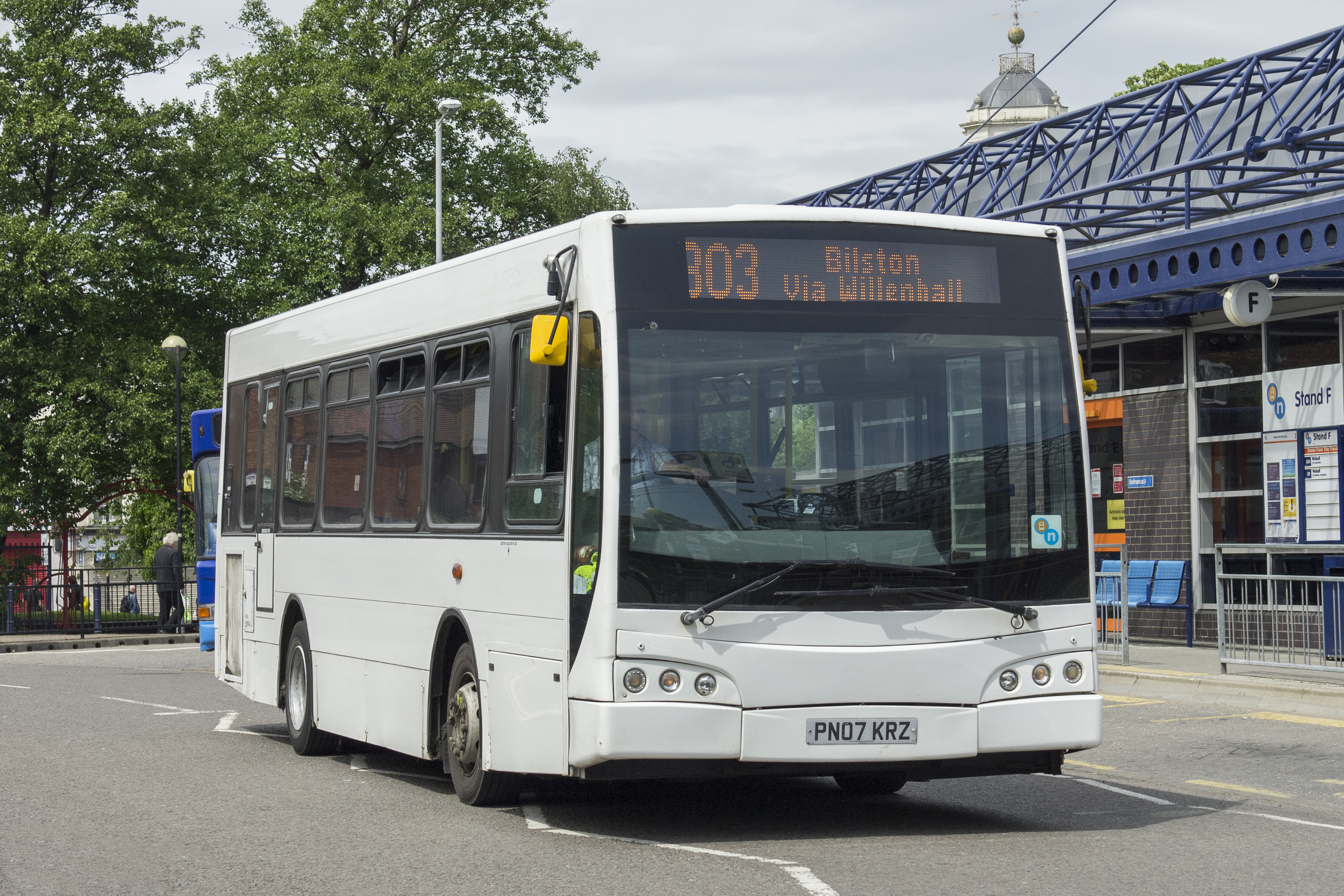
- East Lancs Esteem in 2020
- Parent: Kishan Singh Chumber
- Headquarters: Blakenhall, Wolverhampton
- Service area: Wolverhampton / West Midlands
- Service type: Bus services
- Routes: 3
- Depots: Dudley Road, Wolverhampton
- Fleet: 17

Travel Express is a bus company based in Wolverhampton, West Midlands, England.

== History ==
Travel Express was founded in 2000 by Kishan Singh Chumber. Initially, the company ran services in Birmingham before switching operations to Wolverhampton.

== Services ==
Travel Express operated six main services around Wolverhampton including services 1, 11 and 59, which compete with National Express West Midlands. Travel Express also operated four Transport for West Midlands tendered services - 63, 64, 65 (in Wolverhampton) and 303 Bilston to Willenhall but these are now operated by Diamond Bus following retendering. In addition positioning journeys were operated on service 3 and 529.

Previously, Travel Express have operated service 2 to Bushbury Hill, 32 to Northwood Park and 529 to Walsall in competition with National Express West Midlands.

== Fleet ==
The current fleet consists of Alexander Dennis Enviro200s, with one of them believed to be the only Optare Esteem bodied example left operating public routes in the whole country. They previously had a number of Dennis Darts in the fleet but these have since departed. The company operates from the one-time Midland Red garage in Dudley Road, Wolverhampton.

== Criticism ==
The company came under fire in January 2015 following a public enquiry by Traffic Commissioner Nick Jones, with the investigation finding that buses were unsafe and dirty, basic safety principles were unmet and that the company employed no cleaner, whilst branding manager Kishan Chumber 'incompetent'. Chumber responded, stating that the results of the public enquiry were a "gross vilification of the business" and that Travel Express were being unfairly targeted. The company had its number of allowed buses reduced from 13 to 8, and its routes reduced from 4 to 2. In September 2015, the company's licence was revoked for failing to comply with requirements imposed by the Traffic Commissioner.

In 2016, Travel Express, now trading as ‘Let’s Go’ received a new licence to operate 8 vehicles, under three conditions:

- The company employ a full-time transport manager,
- The company employ a full time mechanic,
- Mr Chumber has no role in vehicle maintenance.

In 2018, Travel Express' owner, Kishan Singh Chumber, applied to be re-instated as a Transport Manager for the company. At the January 2018 Traffic Commission meeting, he withdrew his application.

In May 2024, it was announced that the company would have its license revoked with effect from 16 June 2024. The TfWM contracted routes began to be operated by Diamond Bus from Monday 17 June 2024. Commercially operated journeys on services 1, 3, 11 and 529 would not be replaced.

Let's Go continue to operate the 1, 11 and 59 services while awaiting their appeal against the revoking of their license.

== See also ==
- List of bus operators of the United Kingdom
