= Connect2Wiltshire =

Demand responsive transport network in southern Wiltshire

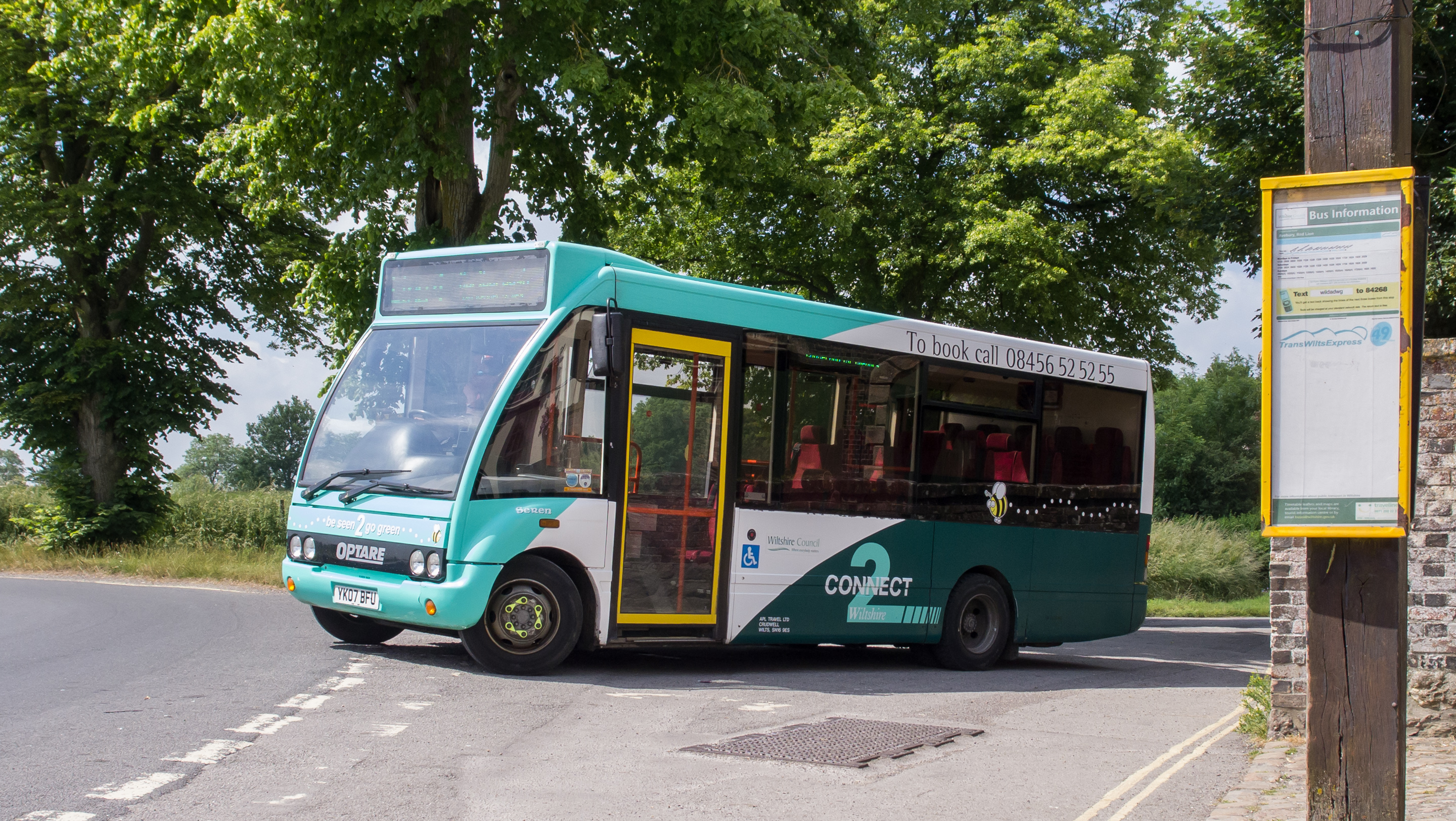
Optare Solo in Avebury, July 2013

Connect2Wiltshire is a demand responsive transport network in southern Wiltshire, England. It is funded by Wiltshire Council and operates in several areas including Calne, Kennet Valley, Mere, the Vale of Pewsey, Wootton Bassett, Malmesbury and the Woodford & Wylye Valleys.

The network combines the former Wigglybus and other shared taxi networks under one brand. Unlike many bus services, all passengers have to book at least one hour before travelling. It operates standard taxi services also. Unlike standard taxis, these are charged at bus rates. The name was chosen because the council required a new licence to use the name Wigglybus.

Connect2Wiltshire also oversee bus routes 101/102/103 (Devizes to Pewsey), operated since August 2017 by Salisbury Reds. These are ordinary bus routes and do not have to be pre-booked.

In 2022, the Department for Transport awarded £1.2million to Wiltshire Council for an on-demand bus service in Pewsey Vale and Marlborough. Services began in Pewsey Vale on 31 July 2023 under the Wiltshire Connect brand.

== See also ==
- List of bus operators of the United Kingdom
