= Cumfybus =

English bus company

Coordinates: 53°27′21.6″N 2°35′22.2″W

Cumfybus Limited

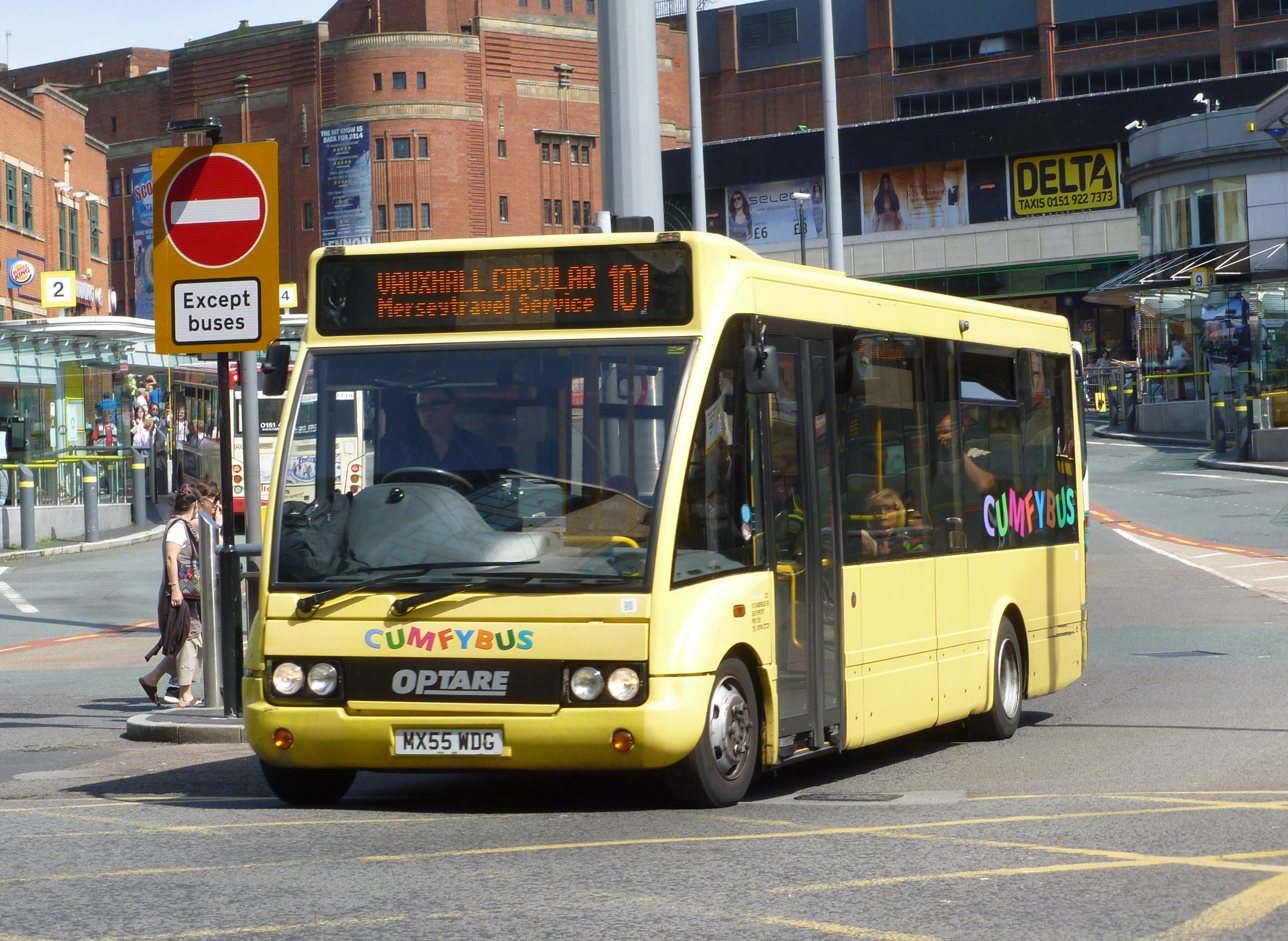
- Optare Solo in Queen Square bus station in June 2014
- Founded: 1986
- Headquarters: Southport
- Service area: Merseyside
- Service type: Bus services
- Routes: 3 (March 2026)
- Depots: 1
- Fleet: 16 ( January 2025)
- Fuel type: Diesel; Diesel-Electric Hybrid
- Website: www.cumfybus.co.uk

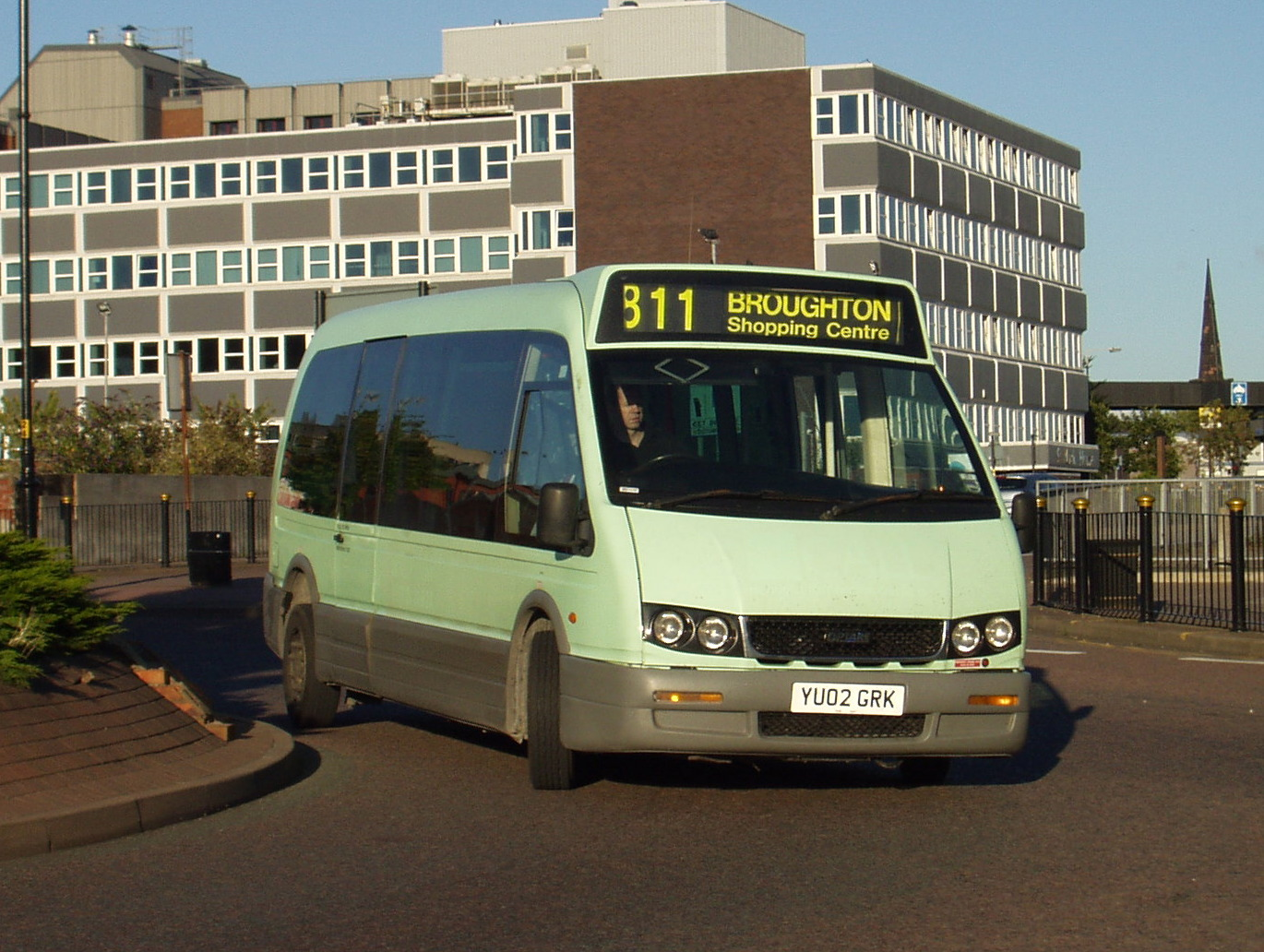
Optare Alero in Birkenhead in August 2007

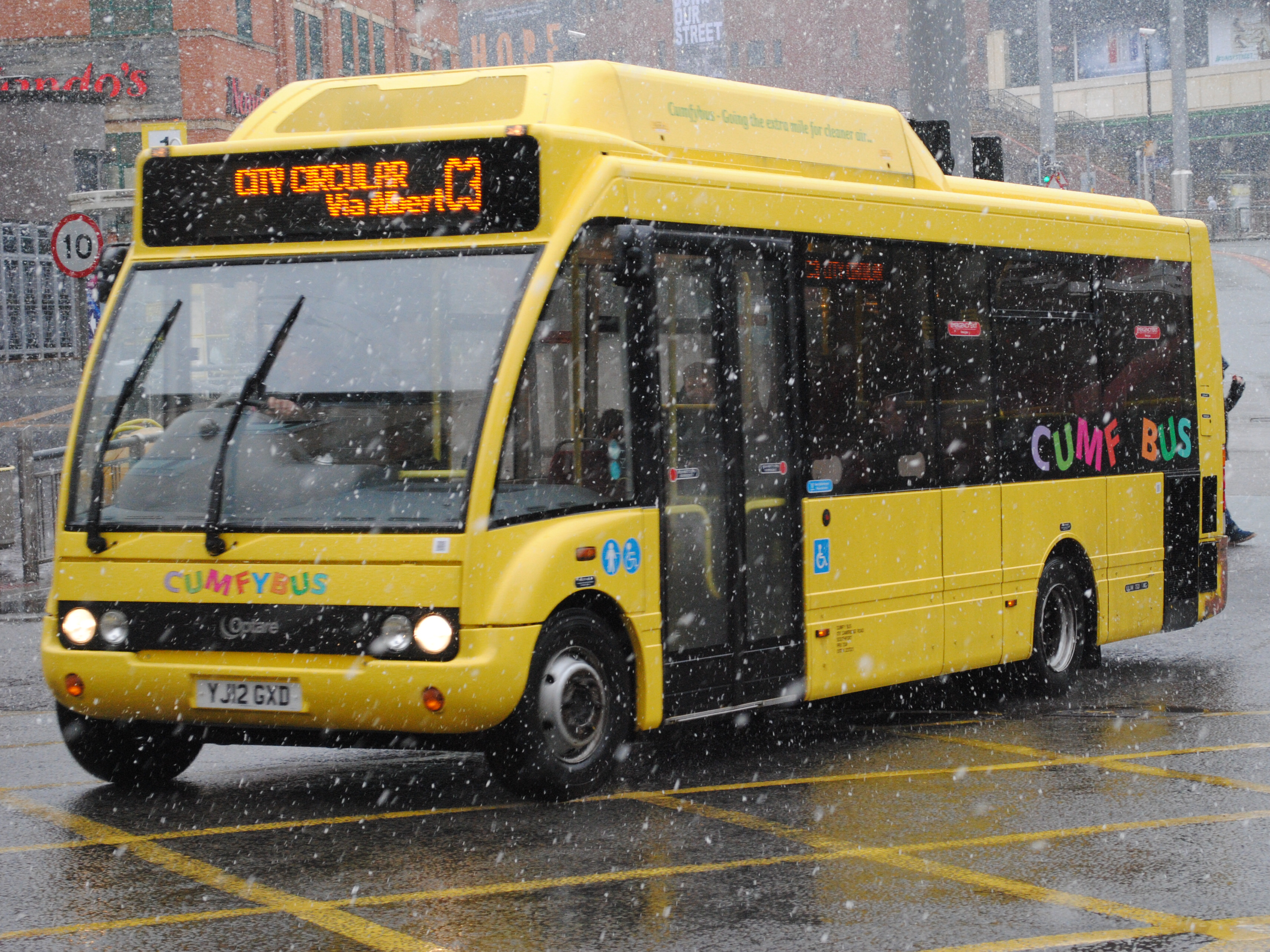
Optare Solo hybrid in Liverpool in March 2013

Cumfybus is a bus company based in Southport, Merseyside.

== History ==
Cumfybus was founded in 1986 by Marshall and Patricia Vickers

As time went on, depots were opened in Aintree, Southport, Kirkby and on the Wirral (initially at Birkenhead before moving to Moreton in 2012). Cumfybus had a short venture outside of Merseyside when it operated services around Blackpool and the Fylde area in 2010. In late 2012, the company moved all operations to a central location at Aintree. The yard at Southport was kept for additional storage and/or maintenance. The Fylde, Kirkby and Wirral depots were closed.

In July 2013 Cumfybus opened a depot in Bolton following it being awarded tendered routes by Transport for Greater Manchester in the wake of the collapse of Maytree Travel.

In March 2019, following the expiry of, or unsuccessful renewal bids for, some of the tendered contracts, the company closed Bolton depot. The vehicles returned to Merseyside and were allocated to the remaining depots at Aintree and Southport for use on new contracts and to replace older vehicles on existing routes. The remainder of the Greater Manchester operation - 5 routes, all drivers, management and support staff and four Optare Versa hybrid vehicles provided by Transport for Greater Manchester) transferred to local firm Tyrers Coaches from 1 April 2019.

== Operations ==
Cumfybus now operate 3 regular bus services and 5 school contracts in Southport. They previously operated services in parts of Liverpool and Lancashire and Greater Manchester. The company also used to operate the Southport 'Park & Ride' service from the Esplanade and Fairways Car Parks into Southport Town Centre on behalf of Sefton Council. As of April 2024, 'Park & Ride' was permanently withdrawn by Sefton Council.

== Fleet ==
As of October 2024, the fleet consisted of 15 buses, predominantly Optare Solos and Optare Versas. A number of these no longer work and have been declared SOR. Some equally old double deck vehicles are based at Southport, with one stored at the former Aintree depot, which closed in April 2024 and is used for the remaining school services in Liverpool.

== Hybrid buses ==
Diesel-Electric Hybrid Buses were introduced for the Liverpool city centre CityLink C1-C5 routes in May 2012. These came in the form of 13 Hybrid Optare Solos of the original design (not SR). These look very similar to the Yellow Solos that they replace but they have the extra box on the roof which houses all the electrical equipment.

== Livery ==
The standard fleet livery is all-over yellow, with multi-coloured fleet names. A few vehicles carry other liveries, including white, silver, or overall advertisements.

== See also ==
- List of bus operators of the United Kingdom
- Public transport in the Fylde
