= WebberBus =

British bus company

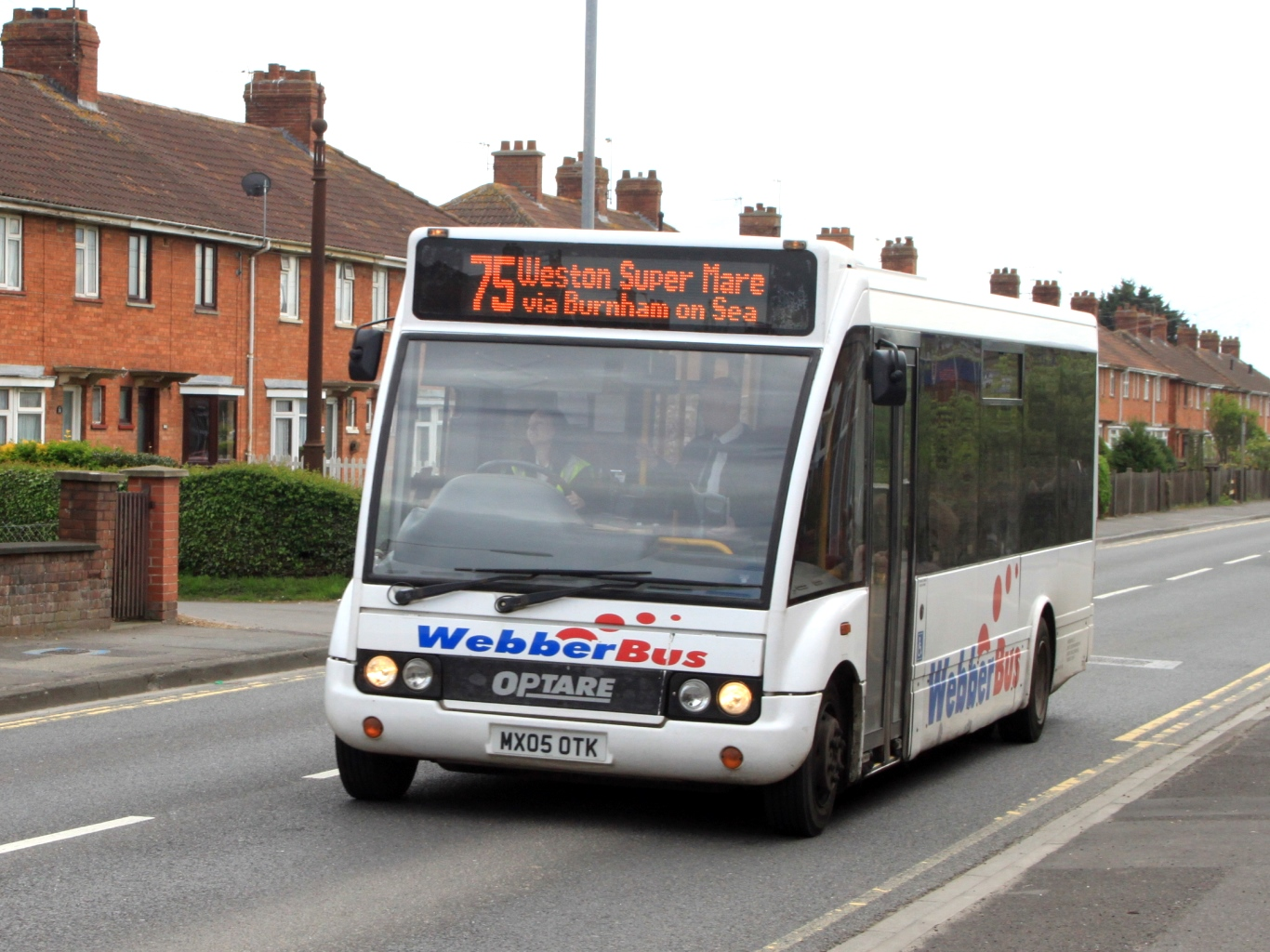
- Optare Solo M850SL in Bridgwater in April 2014
- Founded: 1999
- Ceased operation: 12 May 2016
- Headquarters: Bridgwater
- Service area: Somerset
- Service type: Bus and coach services
- Website: www.webberbus.com

WebberBus was a privately owned company that operated bus services around Bridgwater, Burnham-on-Sea, Highbridge, Minehead, Taunton, Street, Glastonbury, and Wells in Somerset and also around Weston-super-Mare in North Somerset, England.

It operated regular inter-urban services radiating from Taunton on a commercial basis, as well as a number of rural services and local town routes under contract to Somerset County Council and North Somerset Council. The company also operated dedicated yellow school buses on contracted work, and also a fleet of coaches for private hire.

== History ==
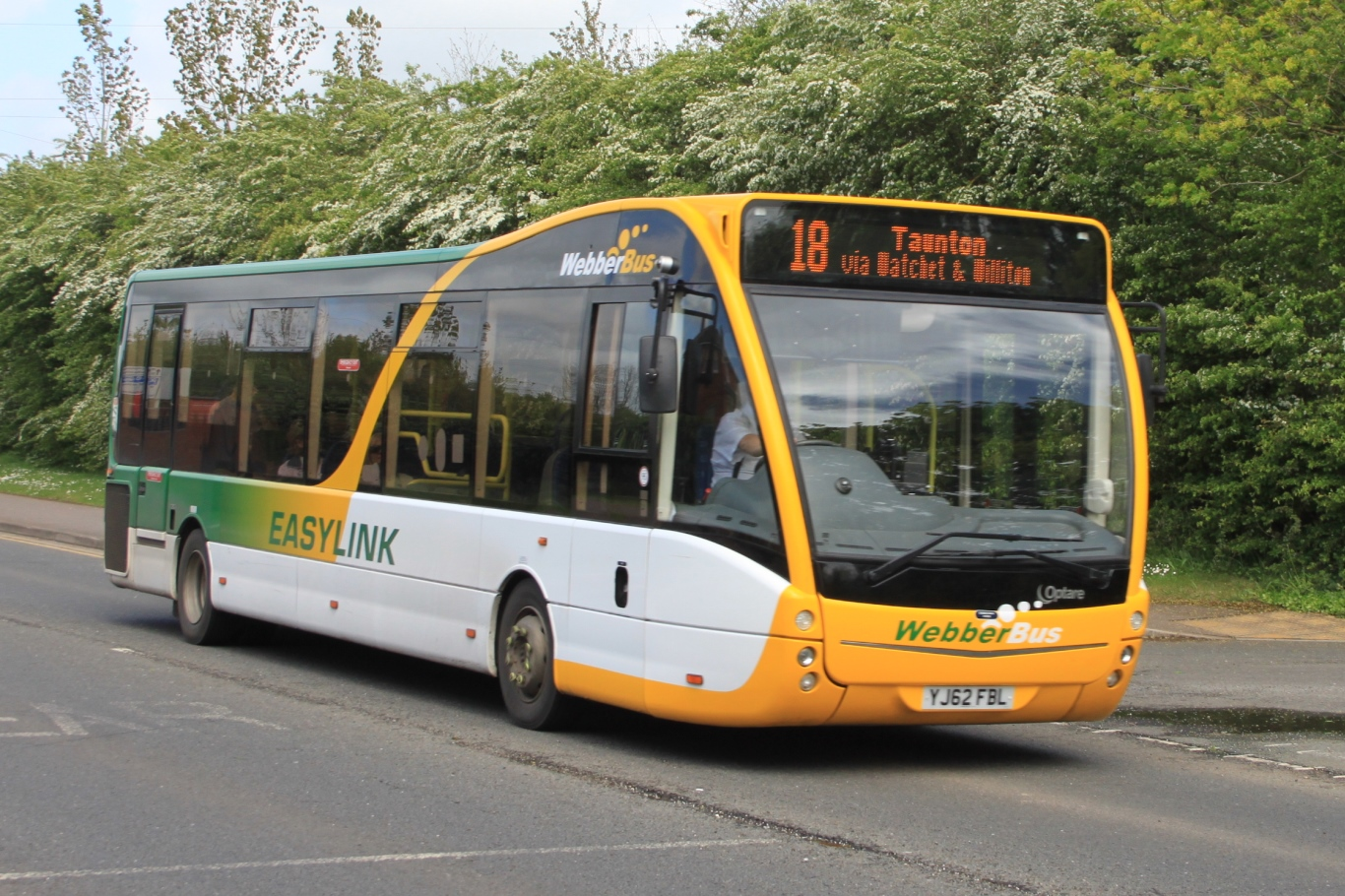
Easy Link liveried Optare Versa in Taunton in April 2014

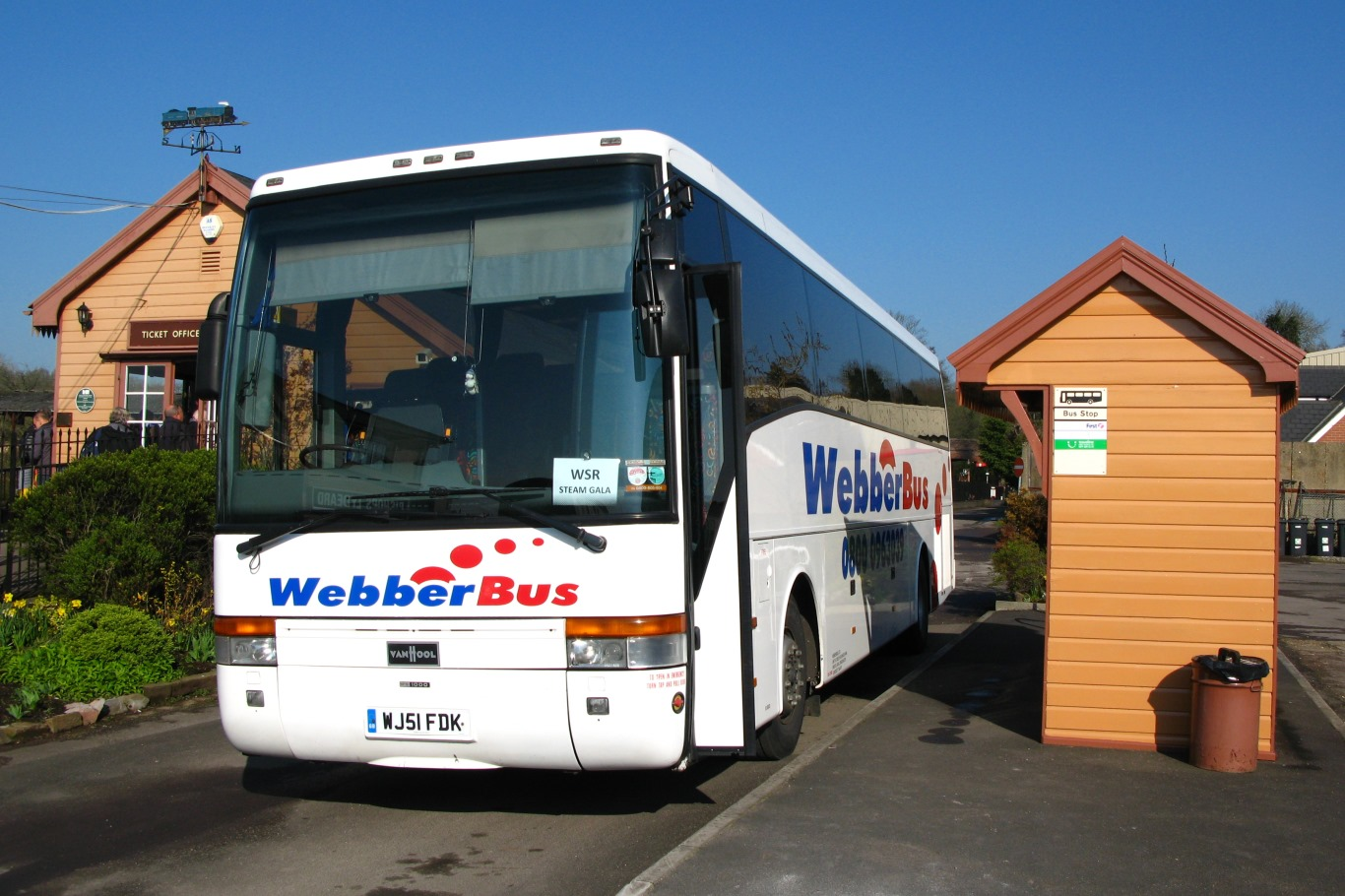
Van Hool bodied DAF at Bishops Lydeard railway station in April 2014

Over 50 years ago the hauliers F Webber & Son expanded their business to include passenger transport with a number of contracts to carry children from Exmoor to school. In 1999 WebberBus was formed, at the time that a second depot was opened in Bridgwater.

In 2005 WebberBus won two contracts from Somerset County Council to operate route 16 from Bridgwater to Langport, and routes 100/101 the Minehead Town Service.

Their first commercial route commenced in January 2007, route 105 from Minehead to Watchet and Williton.

A new route between Bridgwater and Taunton was launched in February 2008 with two Optare Versas. The route proved so successful that a third vehicle was acquired in January 2009 to operate an extension to Burnham-on-Sea.

In 2009 WebberBus gained two more contracted routes from First Somerset & Avon on the basis of operating better quality vehicles. The company had invested £1.5 million into its bus fleet in the preceding four years.

At the start of 2010, WebberBus won the contracts to operate four routes in Weston-super-Mare from North Somerset Council. In February 2013 North Somerset Council announced that the contracts for these routes would be terminated, due to poor service provision.

In March 2010, WebberBus won the contract to operate the Taunton Flyer Park and Ride service between two car parks at Silk Mills and Taunton Gateway. Eight new Optare Versas were ordered to operate the routes. The seven-year contract began in November 2010.

However, on 17 April 2014, Somerset County Council announced the contract for the Taunton Park & Ride services had been terminated due to complaints of late and missing buses, and that The Buses of Somerset would operate the Park & Ride services in the interim.

On 12 May 2016, WebberBus ceased operations after encountering financial difficulties. Somerset County Council stepped in to arrange replacement operators to cover as much work as possible from the following day.

At the end of May 2016 Somerset County Council made an allegation of financial irregularity to the Avon & Somerset Constabulary, and the Economic Crime Team began an investigation.
