= Leisuretime =

Travel agency in the United Kingdom

- Company type: Private
- Industry: Tourism
- Founded: 1995; 31 years ago
- Founder: Ceri Johnson
- Headquarters: Cardiff, Wales, United Kingdom
- Area served: United Kingdom
- Products: Coach holidays, short breaks and cruises
- Services: Travel agency, tour operator
- Number of employees: 50+ (2016)
- Parent: Toureasy (The Group Travel Company Ltd)
- Website: www.leisuretime.co.uk

Leisuretime is a British travel agent and tour operator specialising in coach holidays, short breaks and cruises. The company's head office is located in the centre of Cardiff, Wales.

== History ==
Leisuretime was founded in 1996 by Ceri Johnson who leased a vacant office at the former Cardiff Bus headquarters. Originally trading as Leisure Time Tours, the company began by running coach holidays from South Wales to destinations across the United Kingdom.

The company expanded considerably in 2017 with the opening of a new head office and call centre, a store refurbishment programme and the introduction of new pick-up points and destinations to its holiday programme. Leisuretime has also extended its partnerships with both national and independent travel agents including Thomas Cook and Travel House, and online travel agents including Door2Tour and Coachholidays.com.

In 2014 the company began to utilise its sales channels by launching partnerships with a range of third-party licensed tour operators, enabling the sale of a wider range of holidays. The company went on to sell travel arranged by third-parties under the Leisuretime brand alongside its Cruise Centre and CoachHoliday.com brands.

The company was a member of ABTA and various other travel organisations including the Advantage Travel Partnership.

The Leisuretime brand was acquired by sustainable coach tour operator, Toureasy, in 2022.

== Sponsorship ==
Leisuretime is a well-known sponsor of Welsh sports clubs and societies. The company is the main shirt sponsor of Principality Premiership club, Merthyr RFC and has partnerships with Newport County AFC, Dragons and Ospreys amongst others.

As of 2017, the company is also a title sponsor of Toby Davis, competing in the Volkswagen Racing Cup for teamHARD.

== Charity ==
Leisuretime works alongside Tŷ Hafan, a Welsh-based charity that provides holistic palliative care for children with life-limiting conditions, organising travel experiences for children at the hospice and their families.

== Recognition ==
The company was recognised in November 2016 at the British Travel Awards, where it won the awards in the Best Coach Holiday Company and Best Local Travel Agency categories.
