= Mountain Goat (bus company) =

British bus company

- Founded: 1972
- Headquarters: Windermere
- Service area: Lake District
- Service type: Coach tours
- Destinations: Bowness on Windermere; Coniston; Grasmere; Kendal; Windermere
- Hubs: Windermere
- Website: Official website

Mountain Goat is a bus operator and travel company based in Windermere in the Lake District, England.

== History ==
Mountain Goat was established in 1972 operating minibus tours to the more remote parts of the Lake District. In 2014, the company won a tender to develop the main tourist centre in Windermere from South Lakeland District Council, spending £150,000 on redevelopment. The company supports the use of the local workforce to run the centre in order to make visitors more welcome.

== Services ==
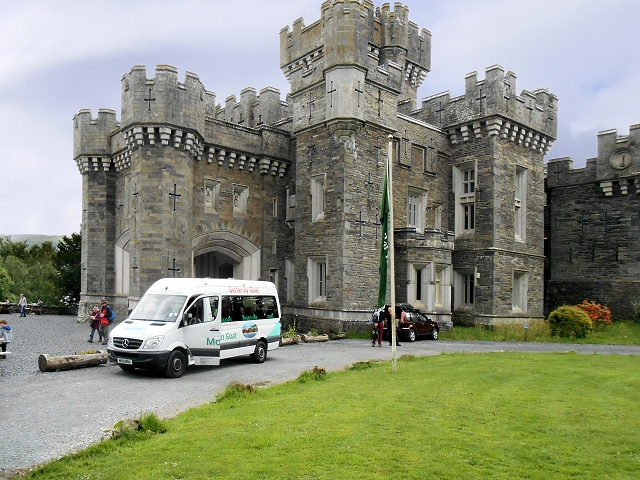

The company runs a service for foot passengers crossing the lake from Bowness-on-Windermere to Hill Top. This is route number 525, and runs between Ferry House and Hawkshead. You can also take the 525 from Hawkshead, where it does a round loop via Wray Castle.
