= Bakers Dolphin =

Bus and coach operator in Somerset, England

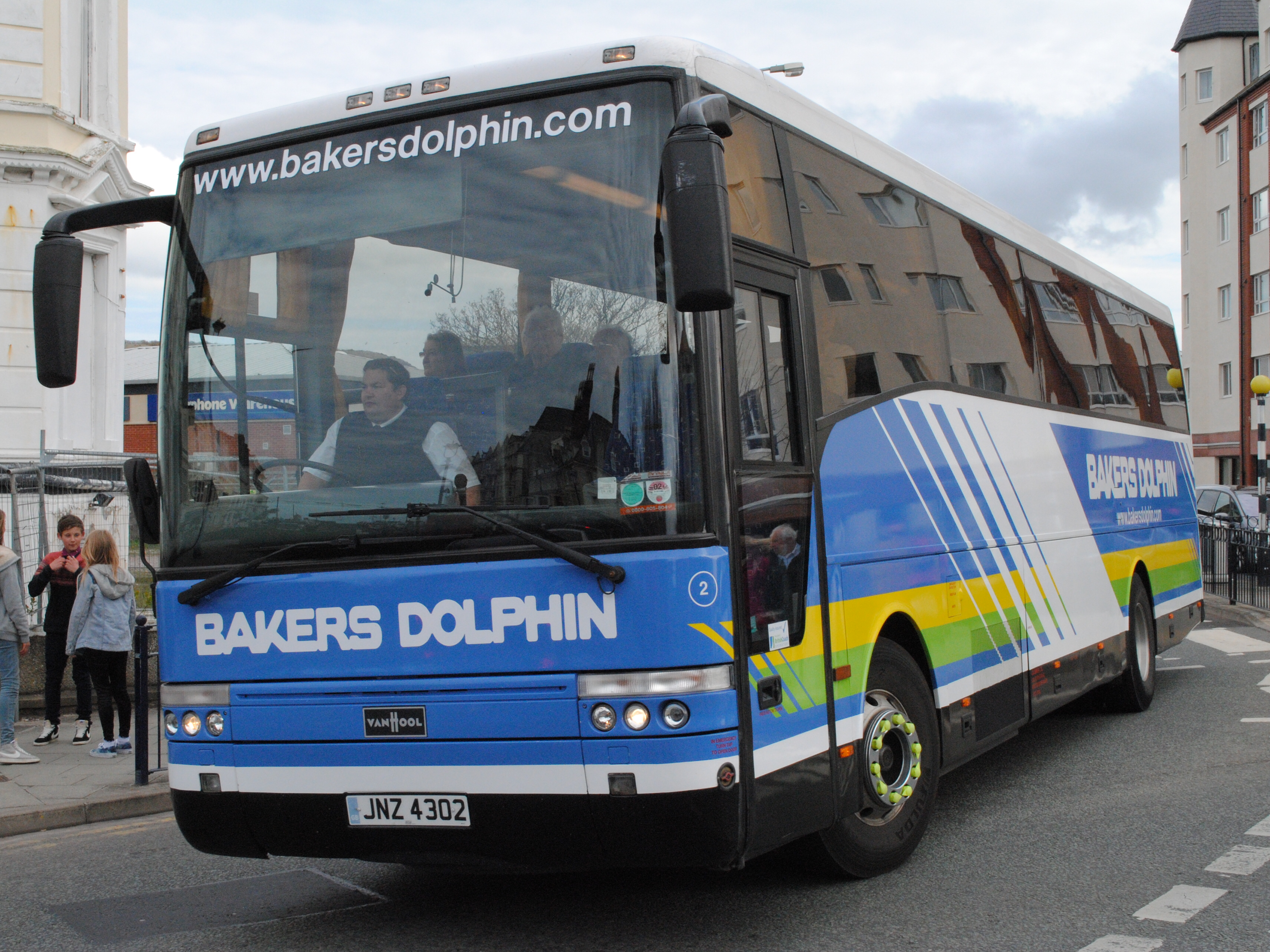
- Van Hool bodied Volvo B10M in Llandudno in May 2013
- Parent: JN Baker ltd
- Headquarters: Weston-super-Mare
- Service type: Bus & coach services
- Chief executive: Max Fletcher
- Website: www.bakersdolphin.com

Bakers Dolphin is the trading name of Baker's Coaches, a bus and coach company based in Weston-super-Mare.

== History ==
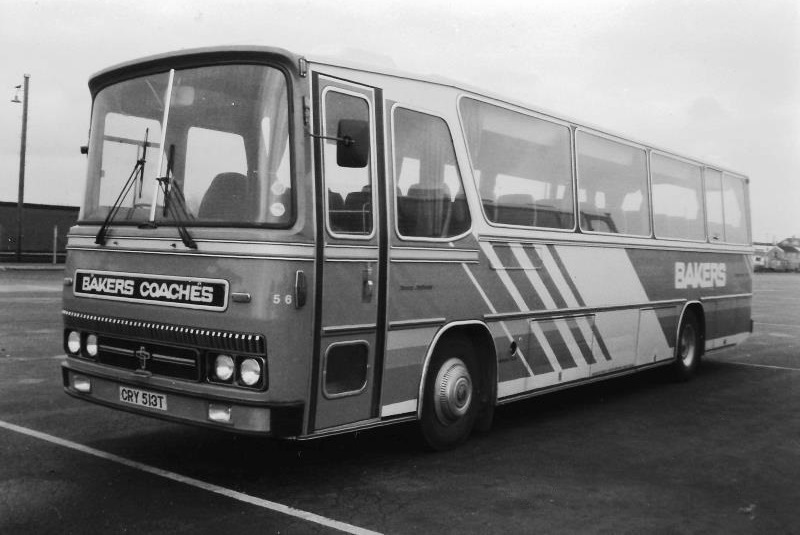
Caetano bodied Bedford YMT in Weston-super-Mare in November 1986

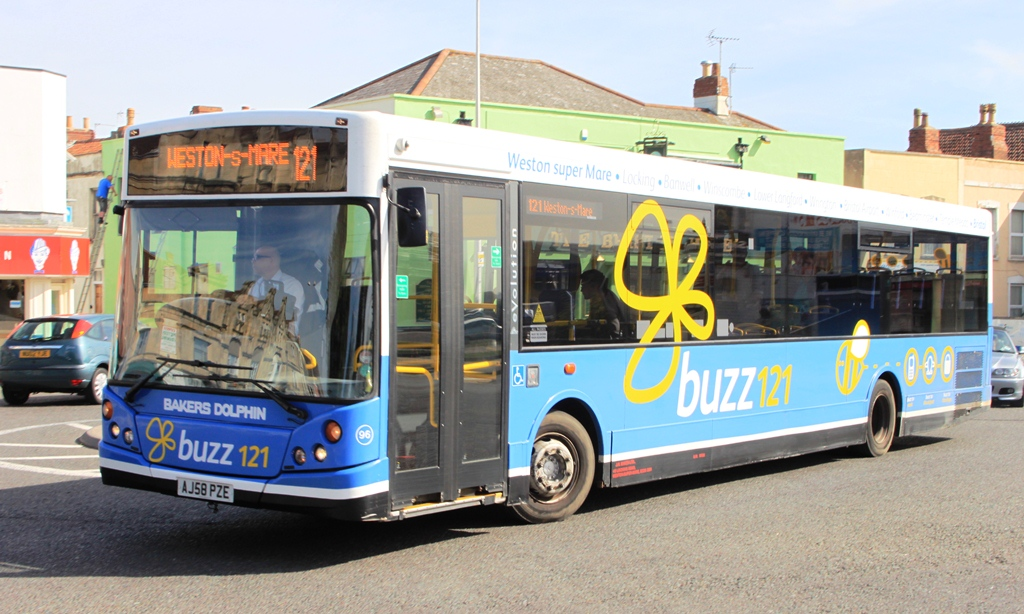
Bakers Dolphin MCV Evolution bodied MAN 14.240 at Weston-super-Mare station in August 2012

In 1889, Charles Baker established a business with a pony chair for hire in Weston-super-Mare. The business expanded and in the early 1900s, Baker won a contract from the Royal Mail to deliver mail to the Cheddar Valley. Horses and carriages were also provided to funeral directors. With the outbreak of World War I, most of Baker's horses were commandeered by the British Army.

In 1923, the company purchased two motor coaches and began operating leisure trips. By the beginning of World War II the fleet had grown to 12. During the war, Bakers operated services transporting aircrews for British Empire Airways. By 1945, the fleet had grown to 30. With the end of the war, Bakers began operating day tours from Weston-super-Mare.

In 1952, the Weston-super-Mare branch of Bristol's largest operator Wessex Coaches, was purchased. With the opening of Britain's motorway network in the 1960s, Bakers expanded its tour operations.

In 1981, Bakers purchased the business of Wems Coaches, its largest competitor in the West Country, the combined fleet totaled 77 vehicles. In November 1984, Bakers merged with travel company Dolphin Travel, with the business rebranded Bakers Dolphin Travel with 100 shops. In 1998, the travel business was sold to First Choice Holidays. Following an inquiry into a large number prosecutions for tachograph offences, the Traffic Commissioner temporarily reduced the operating licence from 85 to 75 vehicles in 2013.

In 2008, Bakers Dolphin opened a high street store in Weston-super-Mare, followed in 2014 by another in Bristol Broadmead.

== Services ==
Bakers Dolphin previously operated public bus routes but now only run school bus services in Somerset. Until August 2013, Bakers Dolphin operated a service to London under the London Flyer banner.
