= Wilfreda Beehive =

English bus company

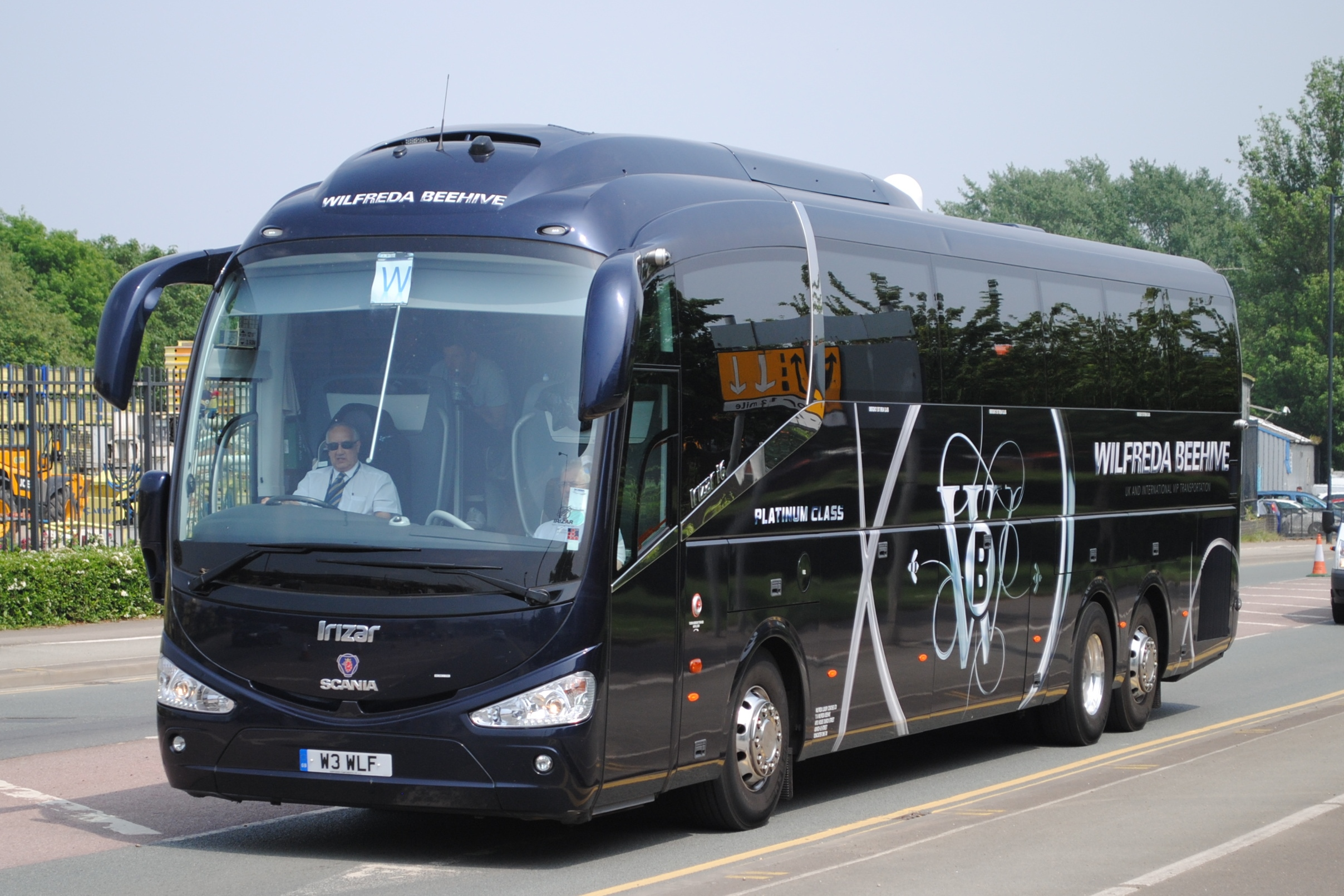
- Irizar I6 bodied Scania in May 2006
- Parent: FirstGroup
- Founded: 1949
- Headquarters: Adwick le Street, England
- Service type: Bus & coach services
- Depots: 1
- Fleet: 45 (April 2026)
- Website: www.wilfreda.co.uk

Wilfreda Beehive is a bus and coach operator based in Adwick le Street, England. It is a subsidiary of FirstGroup,

== History ==
Wilfreda Luxury Coaches was formed in 1949 by Bill and Marie Scholey. They took the name from a coach they bought from Wilfred Graham, a taxi operator in Doncaster who named his daughter Wilfreda and then named a coach after her.

At first, the company operated coach services from a depot at Ranskill, near Bawtry. In 1987 it acquired Beehive Services of Adwick le Street with the combined business renamed Wilfreda Beehive, growing its fleet from nine to 23 coaches.

After deregulation, Wilfreda Beehive began operating route services, selling them to Mainline Group in 1997.

In 2001 Wilfreda began operating service buses again. Many of its routes are school services or South Yorkshire Passenger Transport Executive contracts, a large number of which have been won from other operators. It later restarted operating competitive commercial services. In 2006, the company took over Eagre Coaches, Gainsborough which operated coach tours and holidays.

The company remained in family ownership, managed by the founders' grandson Peter Scholey until it was sold in April 2026 to FirstGroup.

== Fleet ==
As at April 2026, the fleet consisted of 45 buses and coaches.
