= Quantock Motor Services =

English bus operator

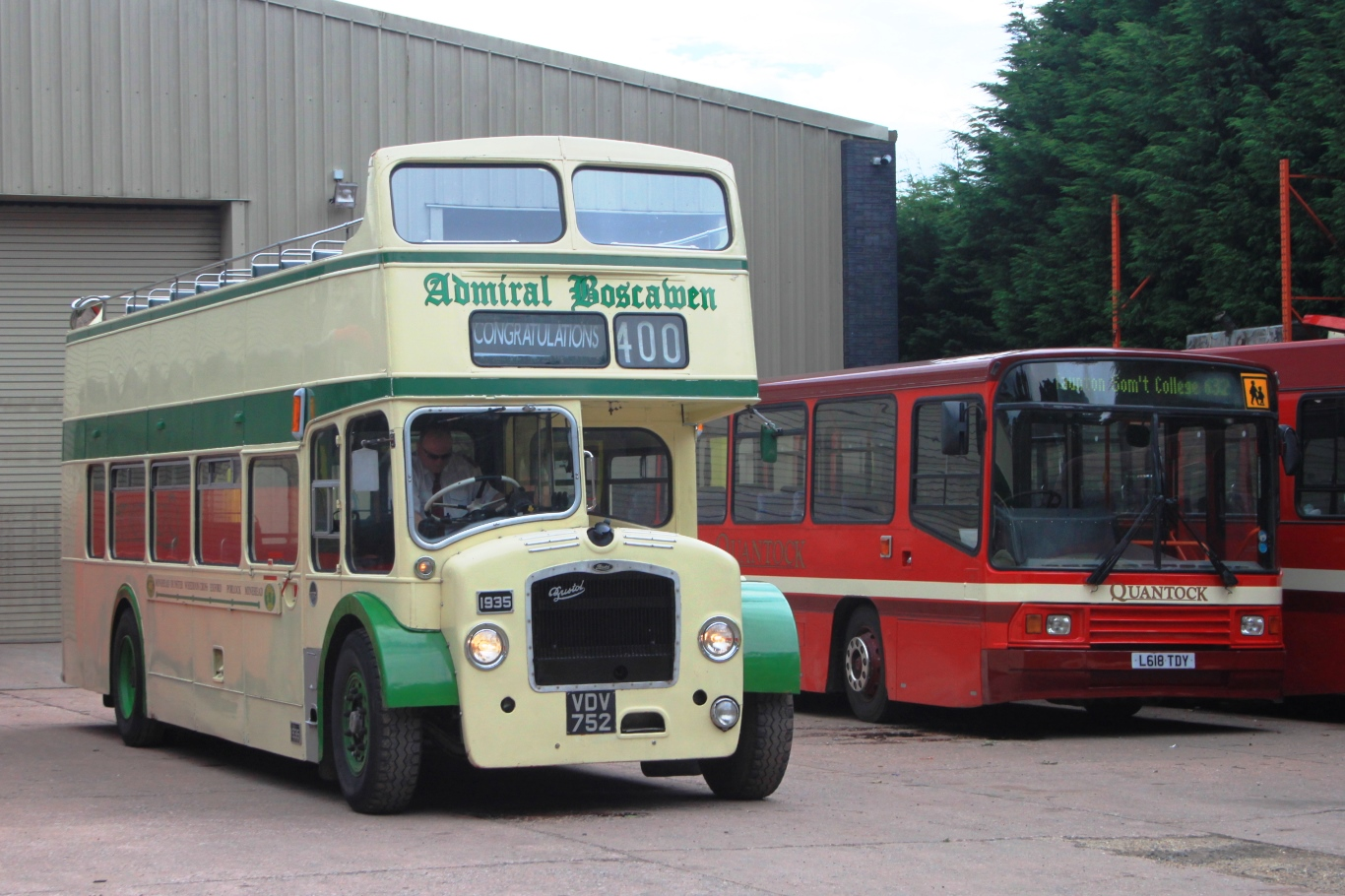
- Heritage Bristol LDL6G & Volvo B10M service bus at Bishops Lydeard depot in August 2012
- Parent: Stephen Morris
- Founded: 2001
- Headquarters: Bishops Lydeard
- Service area: Somerset
- Service type: Bus & coach services
- Hubs: Minehead
- Fleet: 15 (October 2013)
- Chief executive: Stephen Morris
- Website: www.quantockheritage.com

Quantock Motor Services is a privately owned bus operator in Bishops Lydeard, Somerset, England. The company operates a substantial heritage fleet for private hire and on route 300.

== History ==
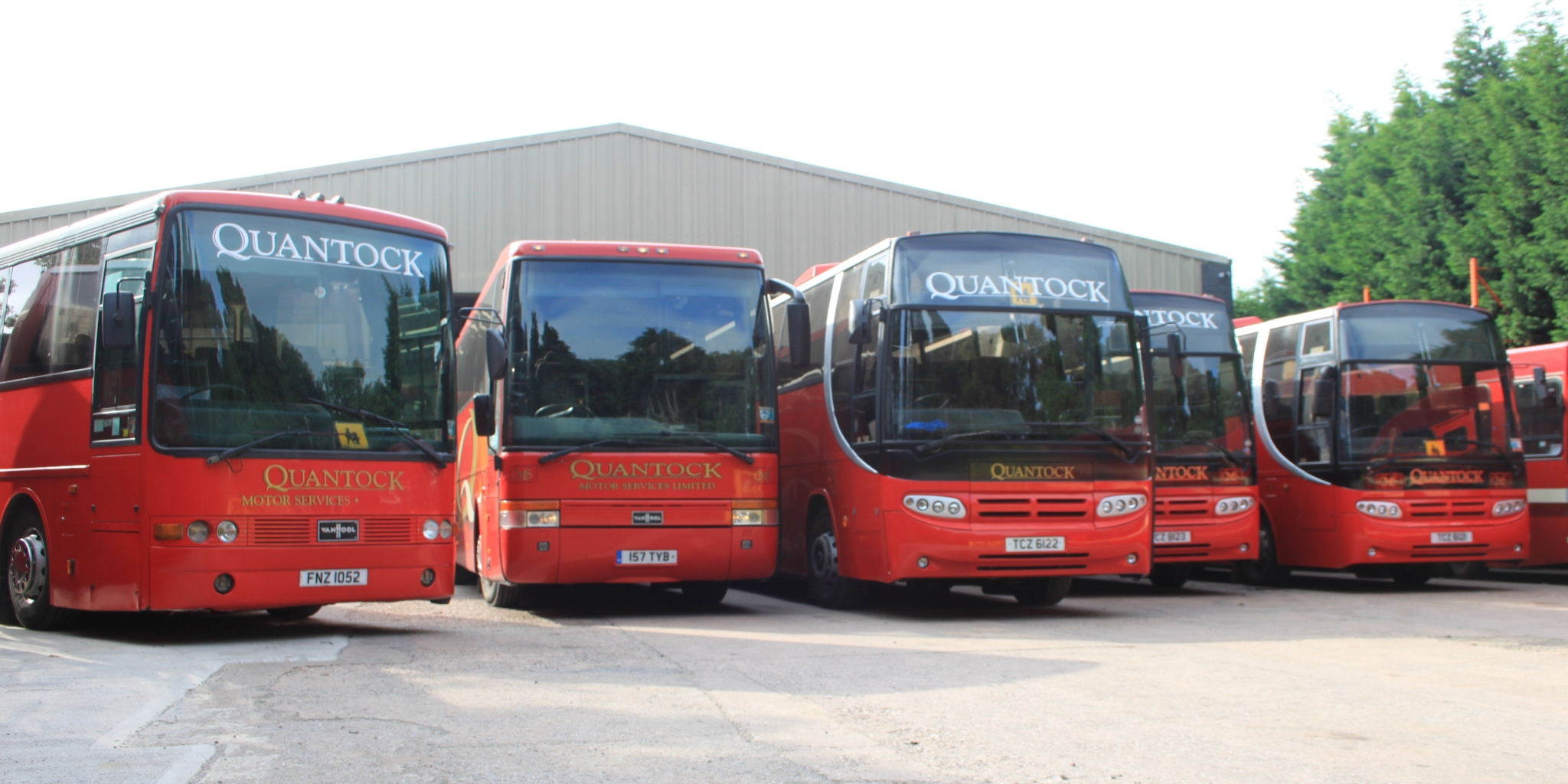
Coach fleet at Bishops Lydeard depot in September 2012

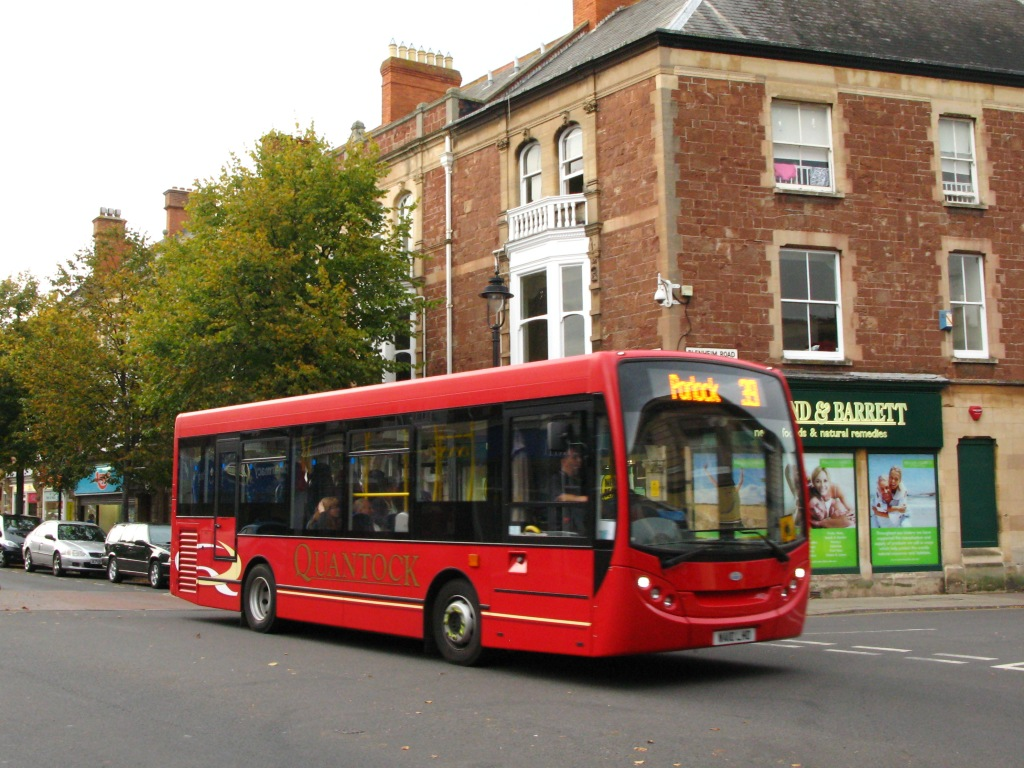
Alexander Dennis Enviro200 in Minehead in October 2010

Rexquote, a transport engineering business in Bishops Lydeard, operated a fleet of old buses under the name of Rexquote Heritage. As well as private hire, some regular circular tourist routes were advertised. One such was between Weston-super-Mare, Sand Bay and nearby tourist attractions in the summer of 2000. In 2002 the Exmoor Explorer circular service was started from Minehead.

In 2001 Rexquote established a new Quantock Motor Services operation. It was initially based in Ilfracombe, with three vehicles to operate schools contracts and a service from Combe Martin to Barnstaple. On 6 September 2014, Quantock Motor Services ceased operating its four route services as well as school services. The vintage hire business continues to trade.

== Routes ==
Public services ceased in September 2014, at which time four services were being operated:

- 10 Wellington - Wiveliscombe - Langley Marsh
- 25A Taunton - Norton Fitzwarren - Tithill
- 39 Minehead - Porlock Weir
- 300 Minehead - Lynmouth

=== Service 300 ===
Route 300, between Lynmouth and Minehead, was for a time branded 'Exmoor Coastal Link'; it appeared in April 2008 in the Daily Telegraph list of the 20 best bus routes in England for over 60s to use free their bus passes. In 2010 it featured on a local BBC programme that featured "great South West journeys".

The regular vehicle for many years was an East Lancashire bodied Scania N94UD open top bus. After the 2012 season this was sold and replaced with a single-deck open top Alexander PS bodied Volvo B10M. The service ceased operating in September 2014, but returned the following summer using heritage (not necessarily open top) buses.

Today, the 300 is now run by The Buses of Somerset as the open top 'Exmoor Coaster' service.

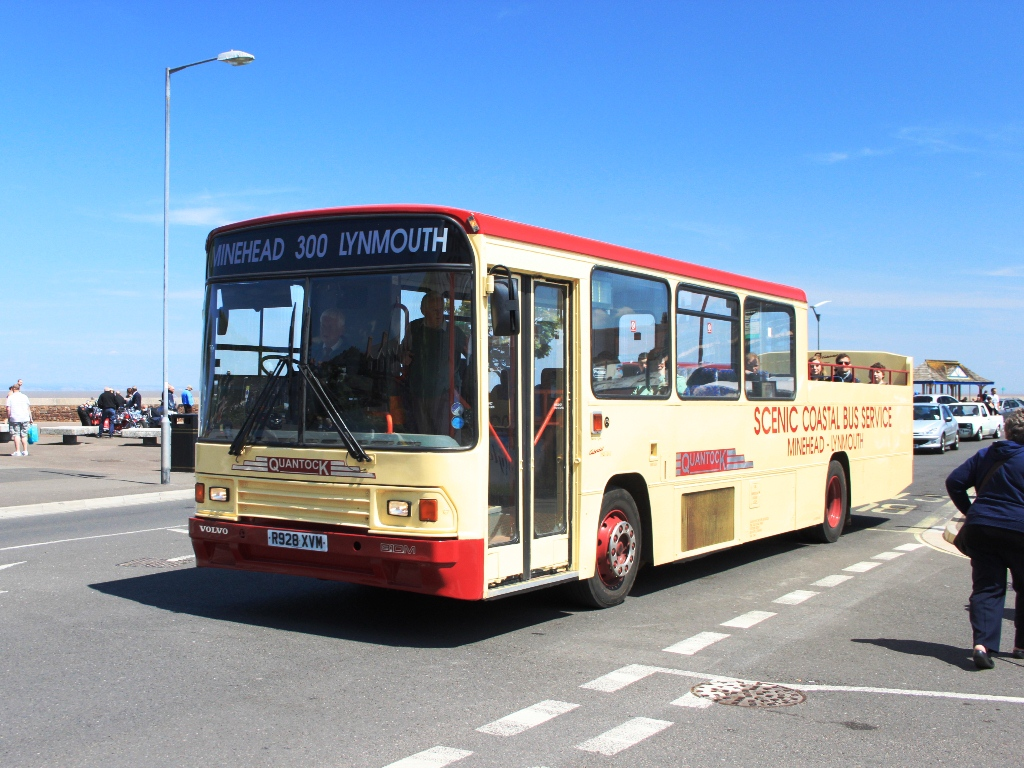
Minehead sea front

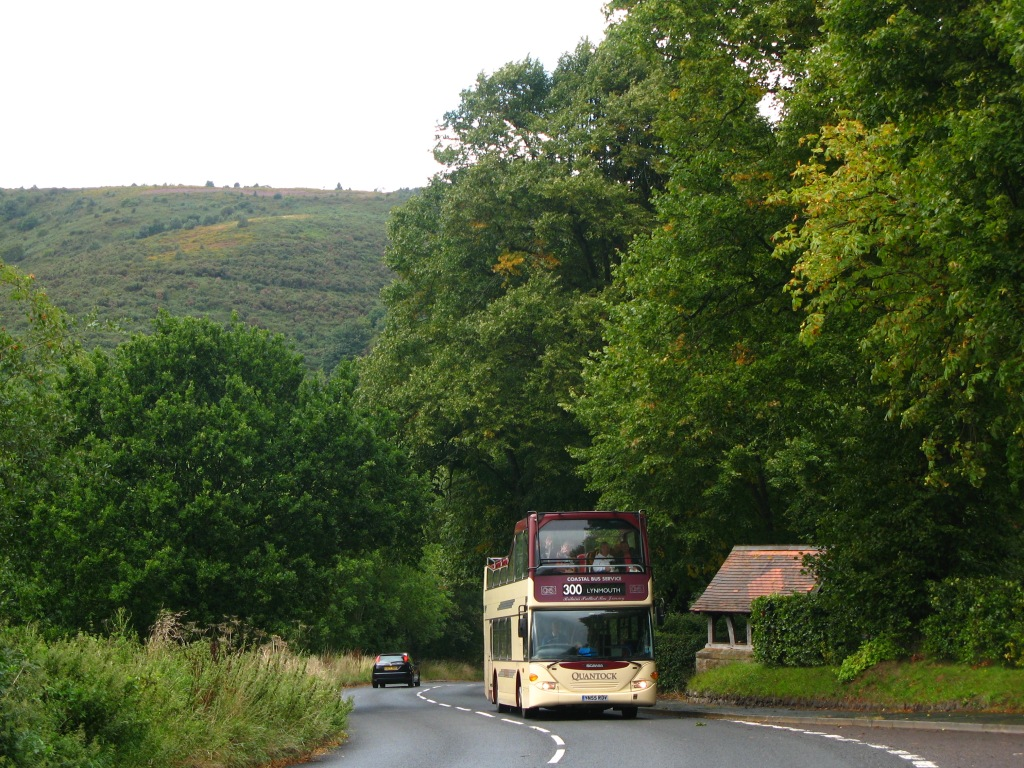
Woodcombe

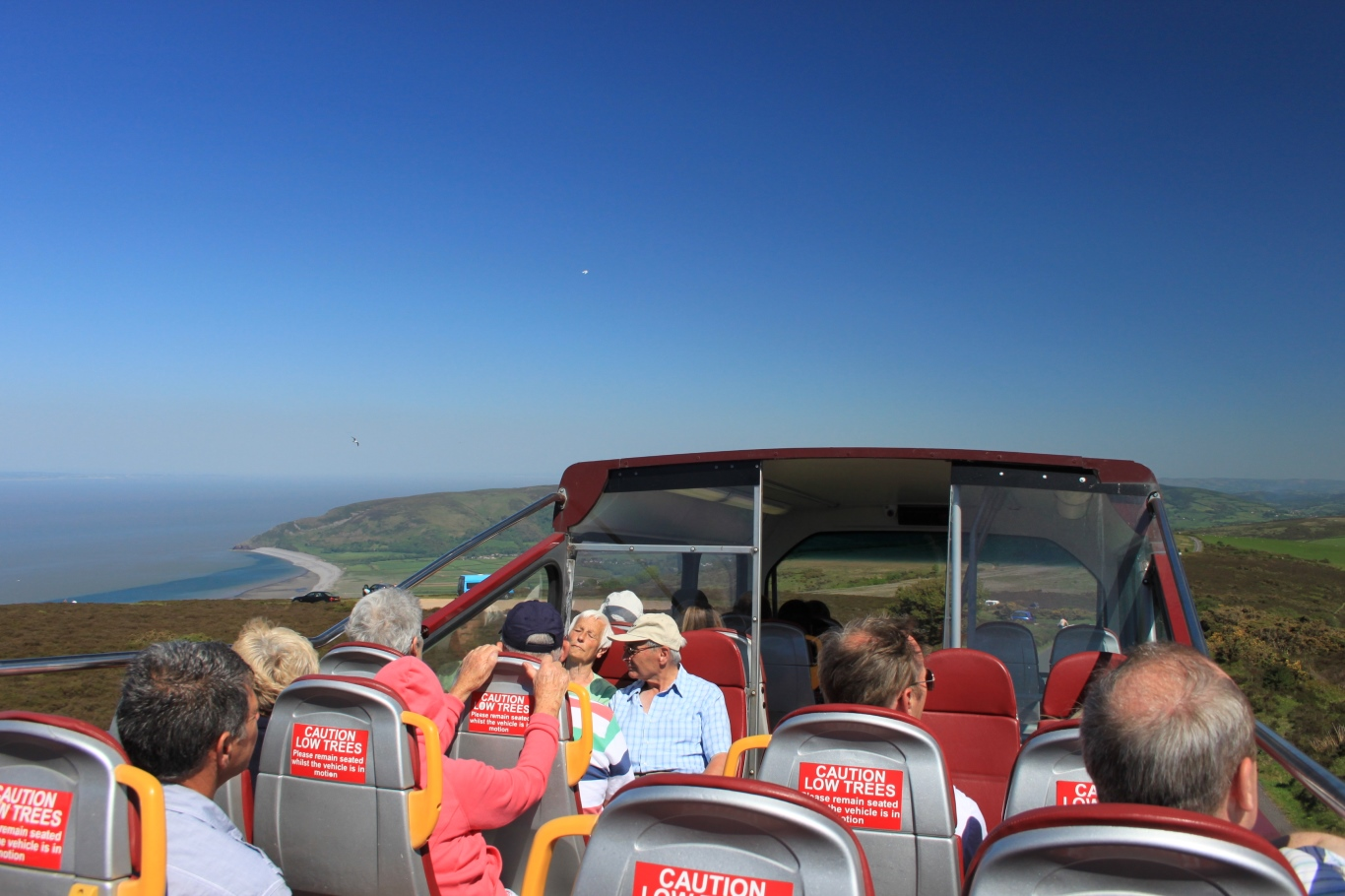
Near the top of Porlock Hill

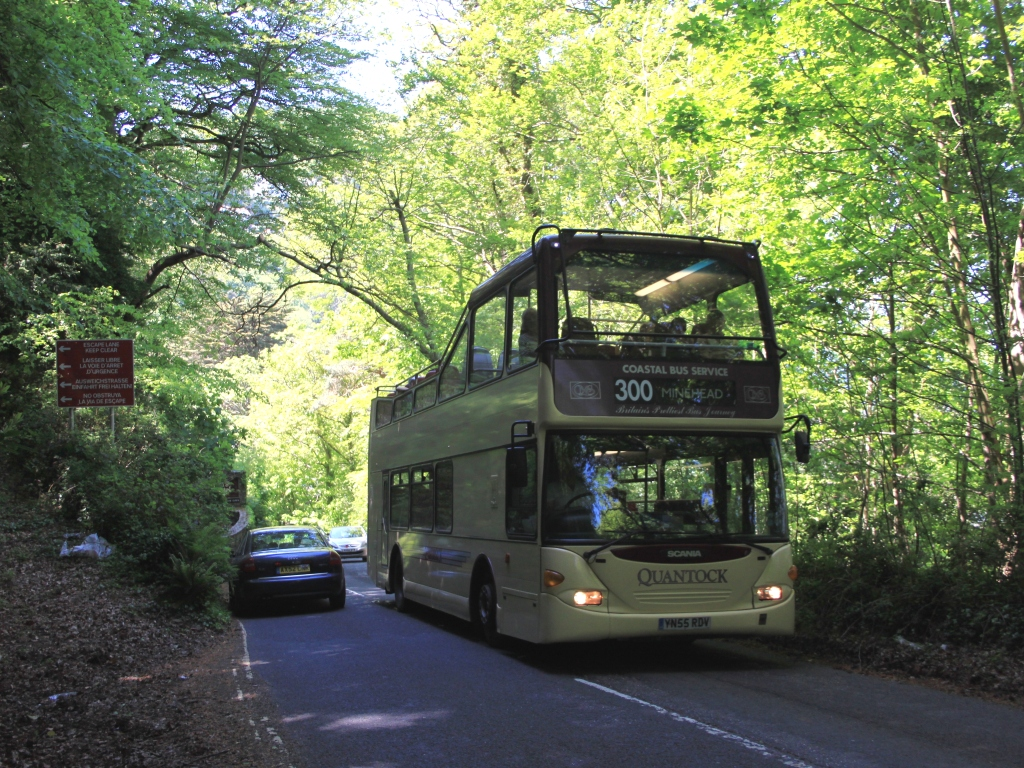
Countisbury Hill, Lynmouth

=== Service 400 ===
Until 2011 the service 400 'Exmoor Explorer' operated a circular tour from Minehead to Dunster, Timberscombe, Wheddon Cross, Exford and Porlock. Operated by heritage open top buses, it only ran on selected days during the summer but was withdrawn after Somerset County Council funding was withdrawn. It had been a recommended route in Scenic Britain by Bus.

== Depots ==
During 2010 the depot was relocated from Norton Fitzwarren, to a facility next door to Bishops Lydeard railway station on the heritage West Somerset Railway. Heritage vehicles undergoing restoration are at an outstation in Langley Marsh, Wiveliscombe.

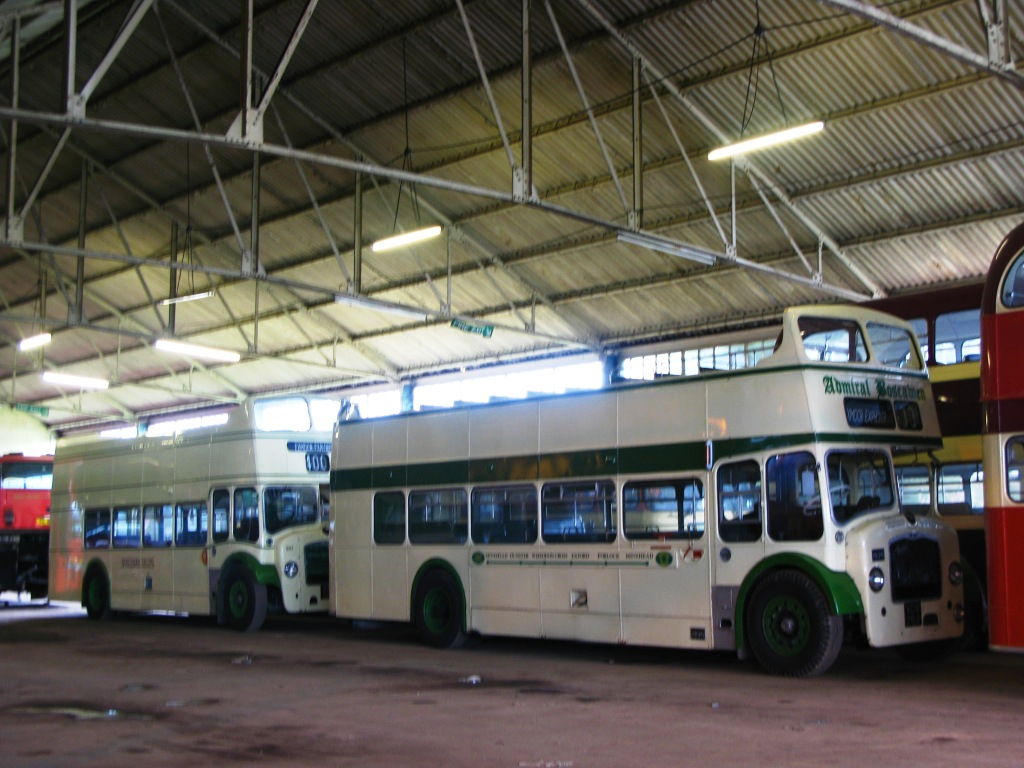
Taunton

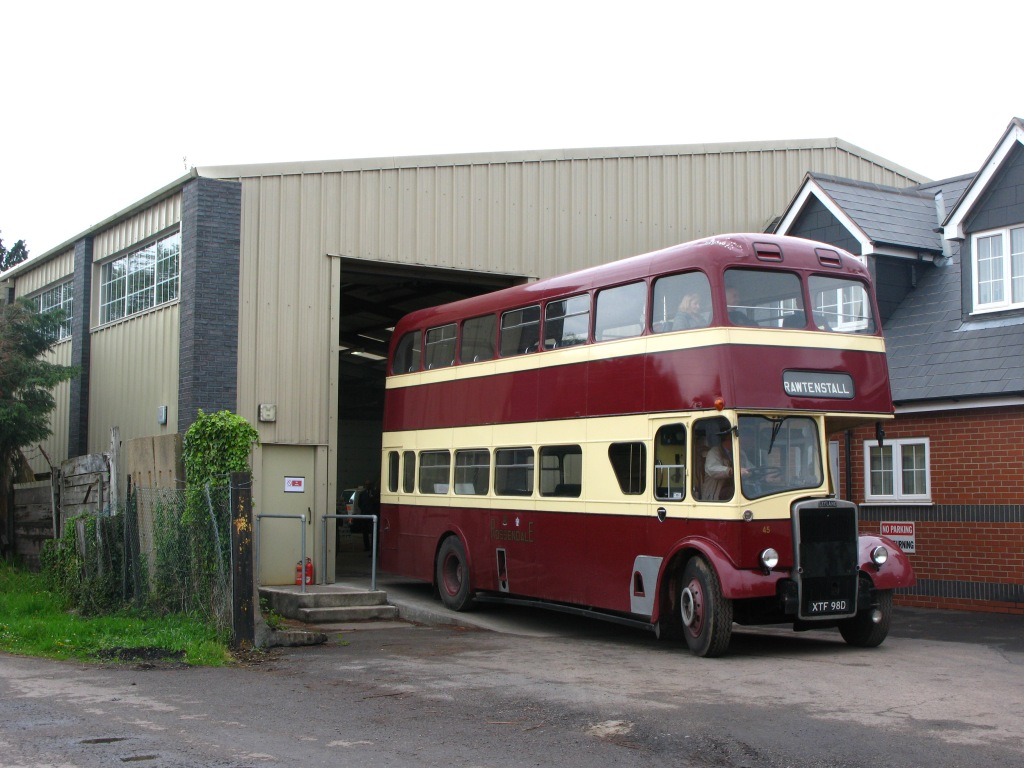
Bishops Lydeard

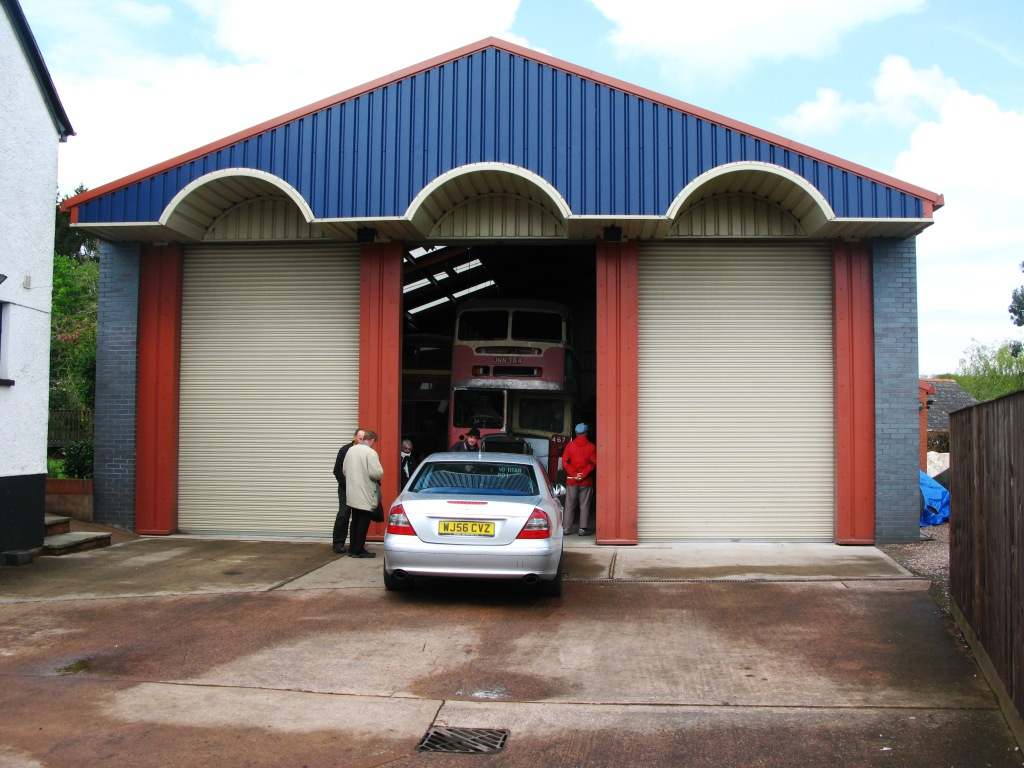
Langley Marsh

== Fleet ==
As at October 2013 Quantock Motor Services operate 15 modern vehicles painted in a red livery. A new Alexander Dennis Enviro200 was purchased in 2010 for new contracts.

=== Heritage vehicles ===
A number of older vehicles are operated by Quantock Motor Services, although not all are licensed for paid operations.

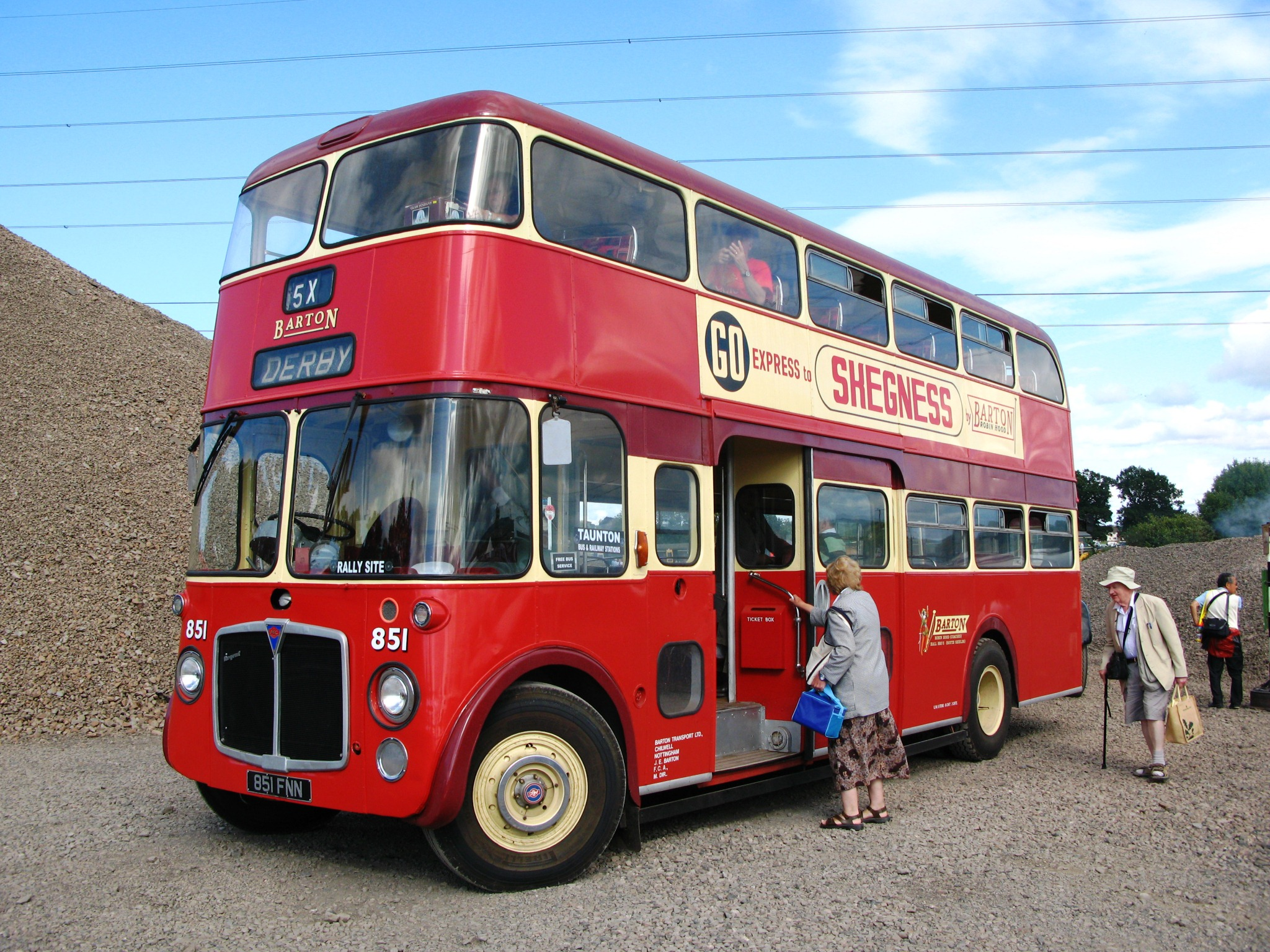
Northern Counties bodied AEC Regent V

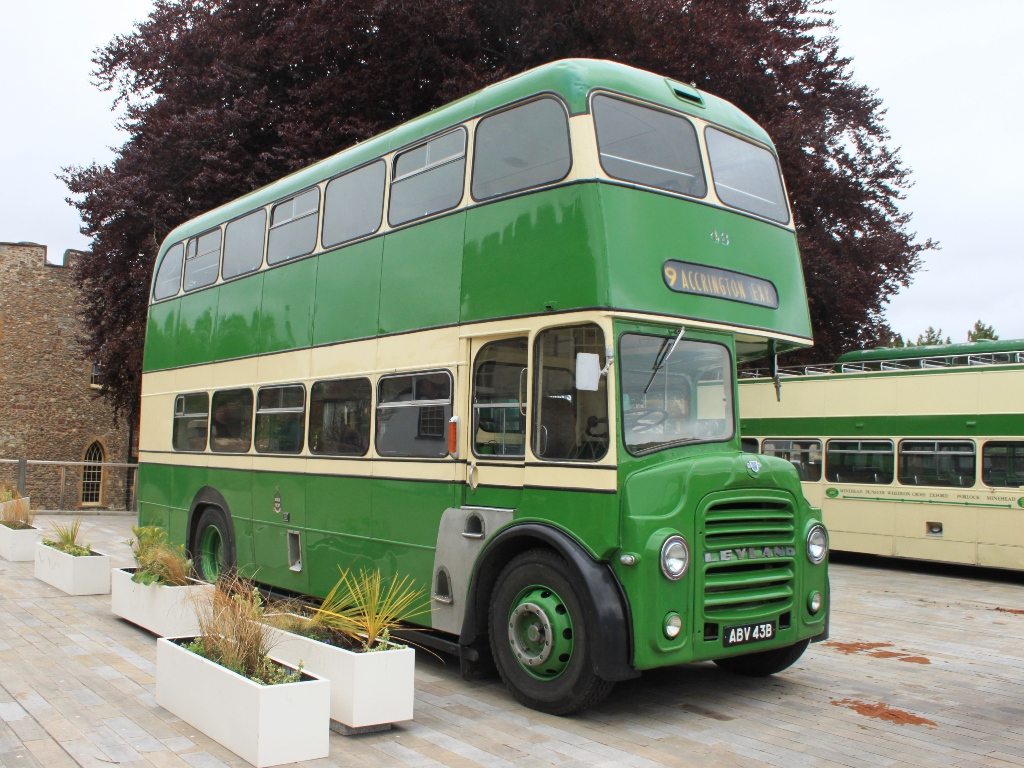
East Lancashire bodied Leyland PD2

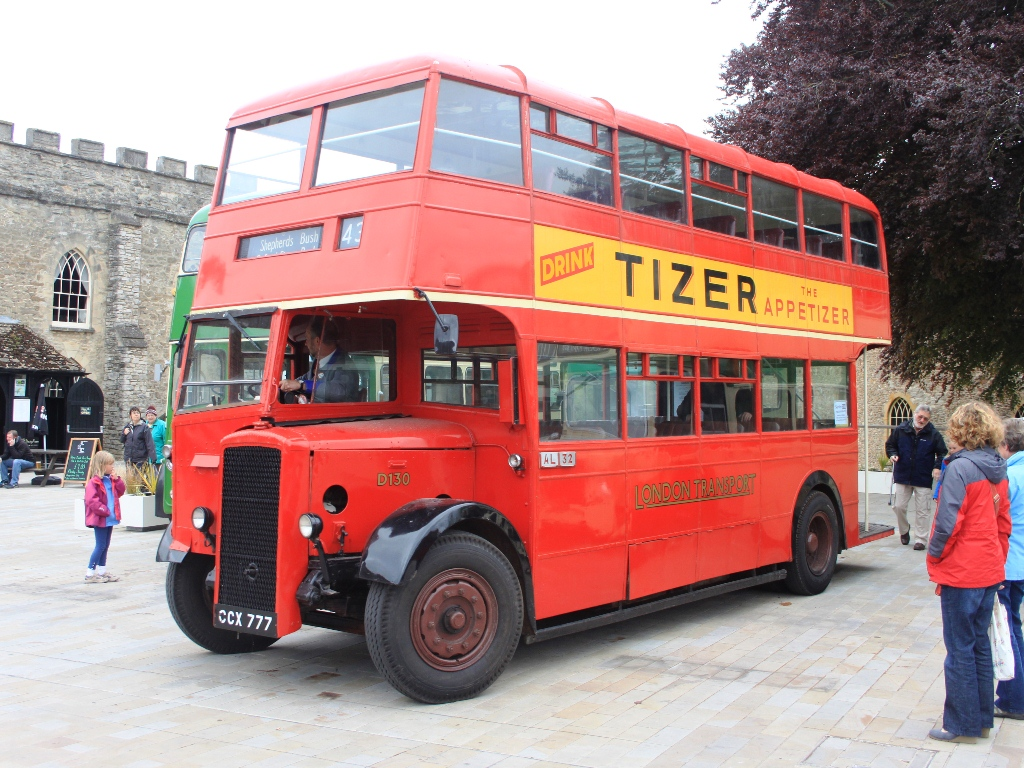
Duple bodied Daimler

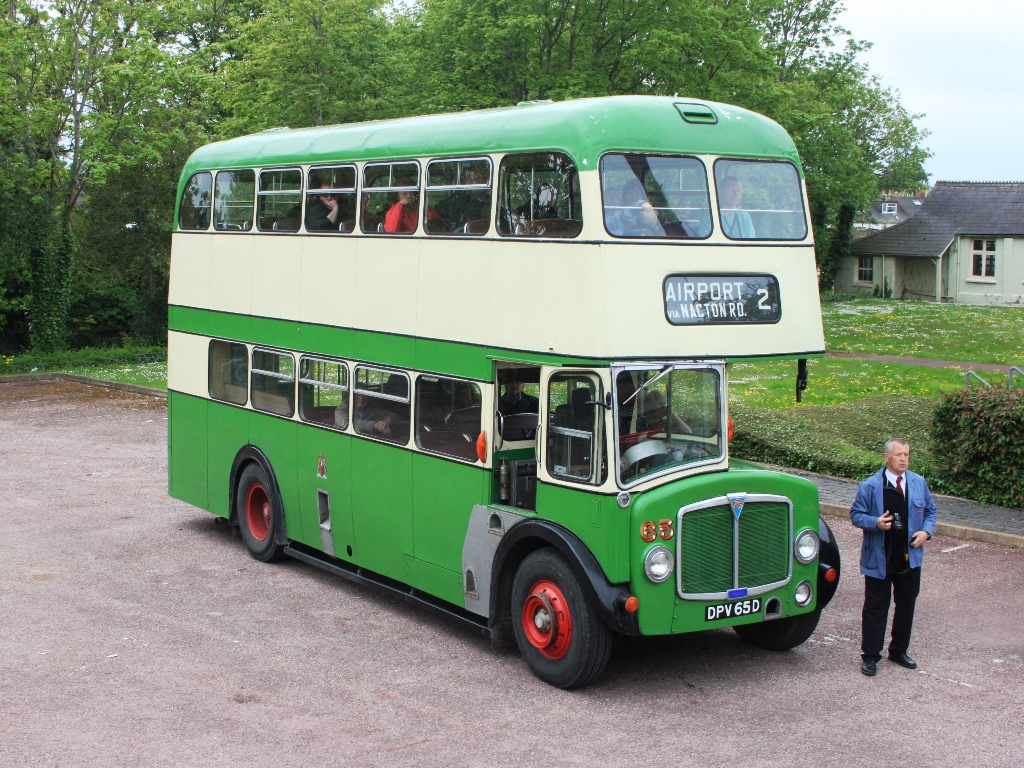
East Lancashire bodied AEC Regent V

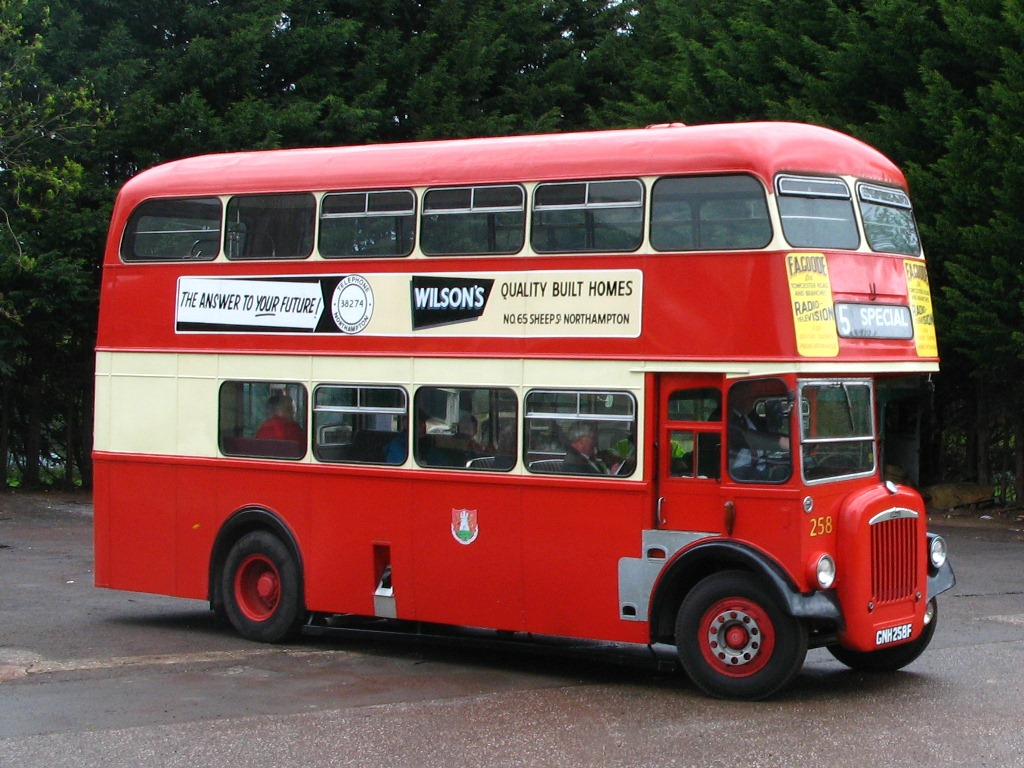
Charles H Roe bodied Daimler CV

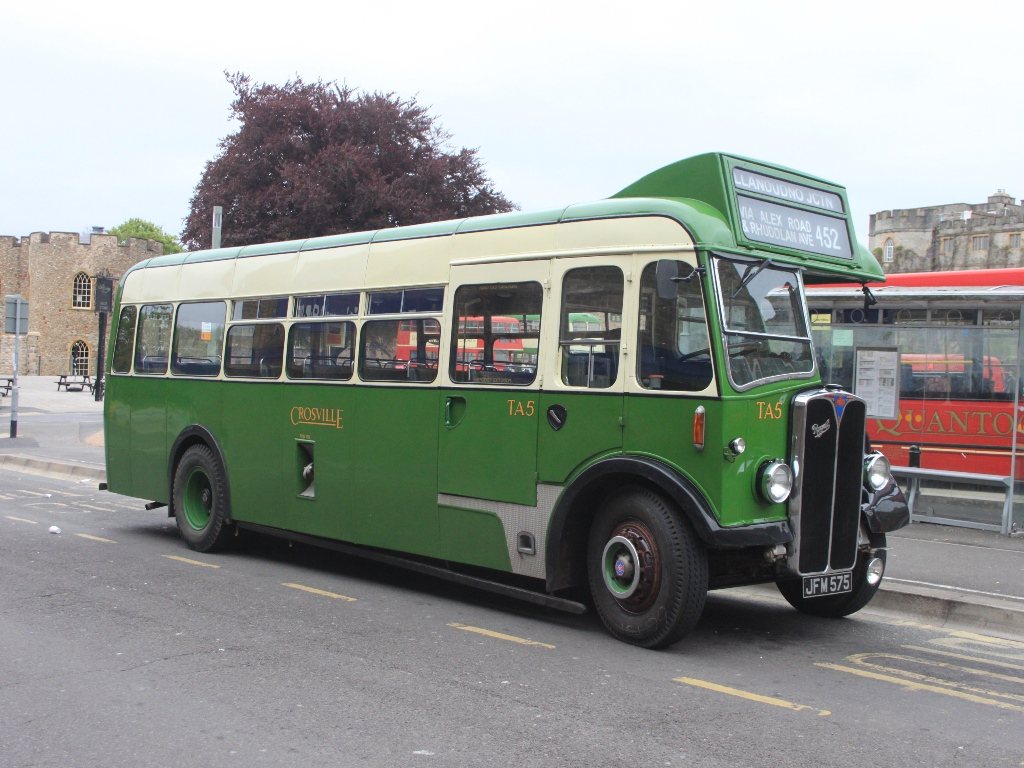
Strachan bodied AEC Regal

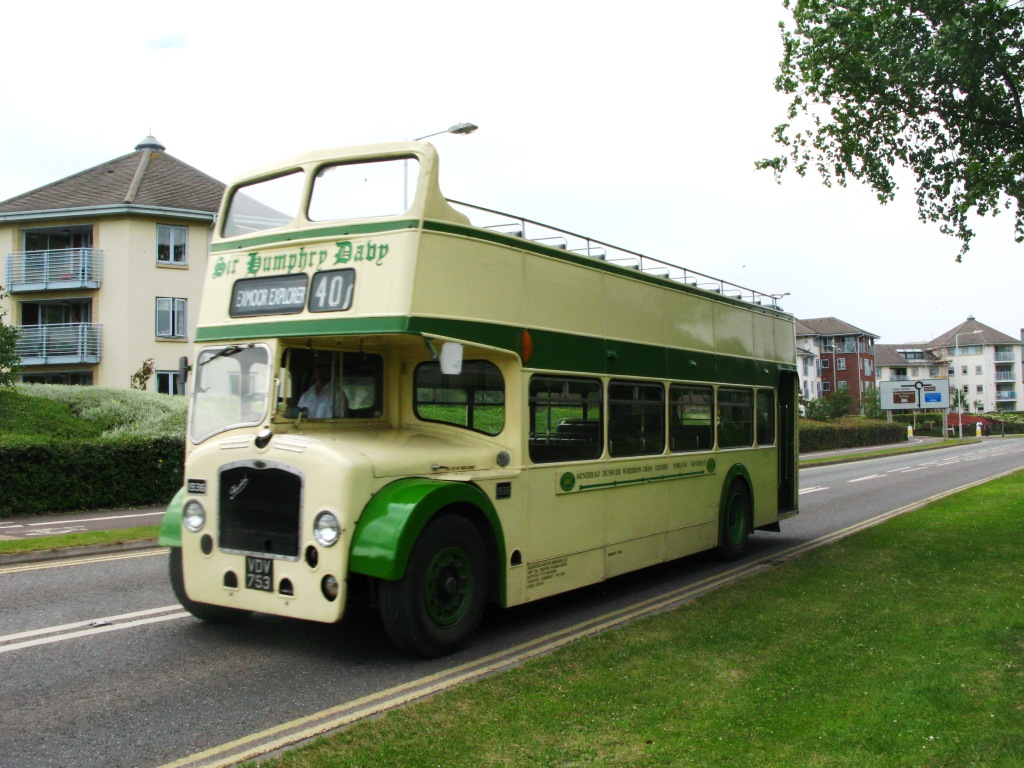
ECW bodied Bristol LDL6G
