= Tates Travel =

Former Barnsley bus operator

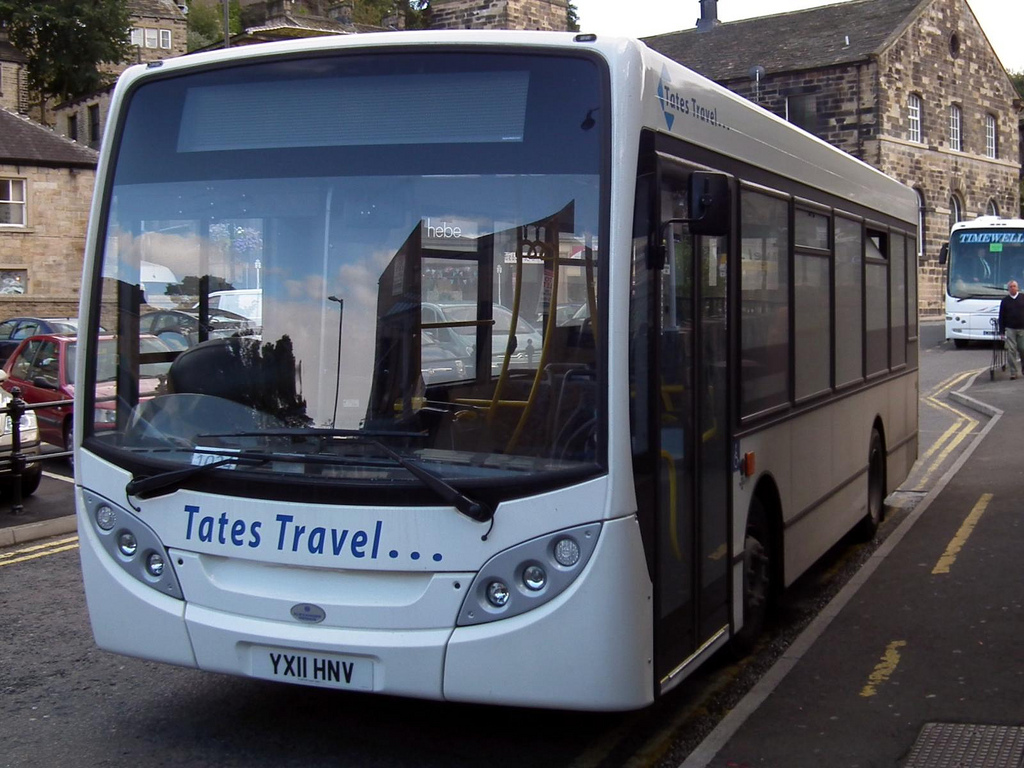
- Alexander Dennis Enviro 200 in Holmfirth in September 2011
- Founded: 2003 by Graham Mallinson
- Ceased operation: 8 February 2016
- Headquarters: Barugh Green
- Service area: South Yorkshire; West Yorkshire
- Service type: Bus services
- Routes: 55 (October 2013)
- Hubs: Barnsley Interchange; Rotherham Interchange; Wakefield bus station
- Fleet: 74 (February 2016)
- Website: www.tates-travel.com

Tates Travel was a local bus operator based in Barnsley in England, operating services in South Yorkshire and West Yorkshire.

== History ==
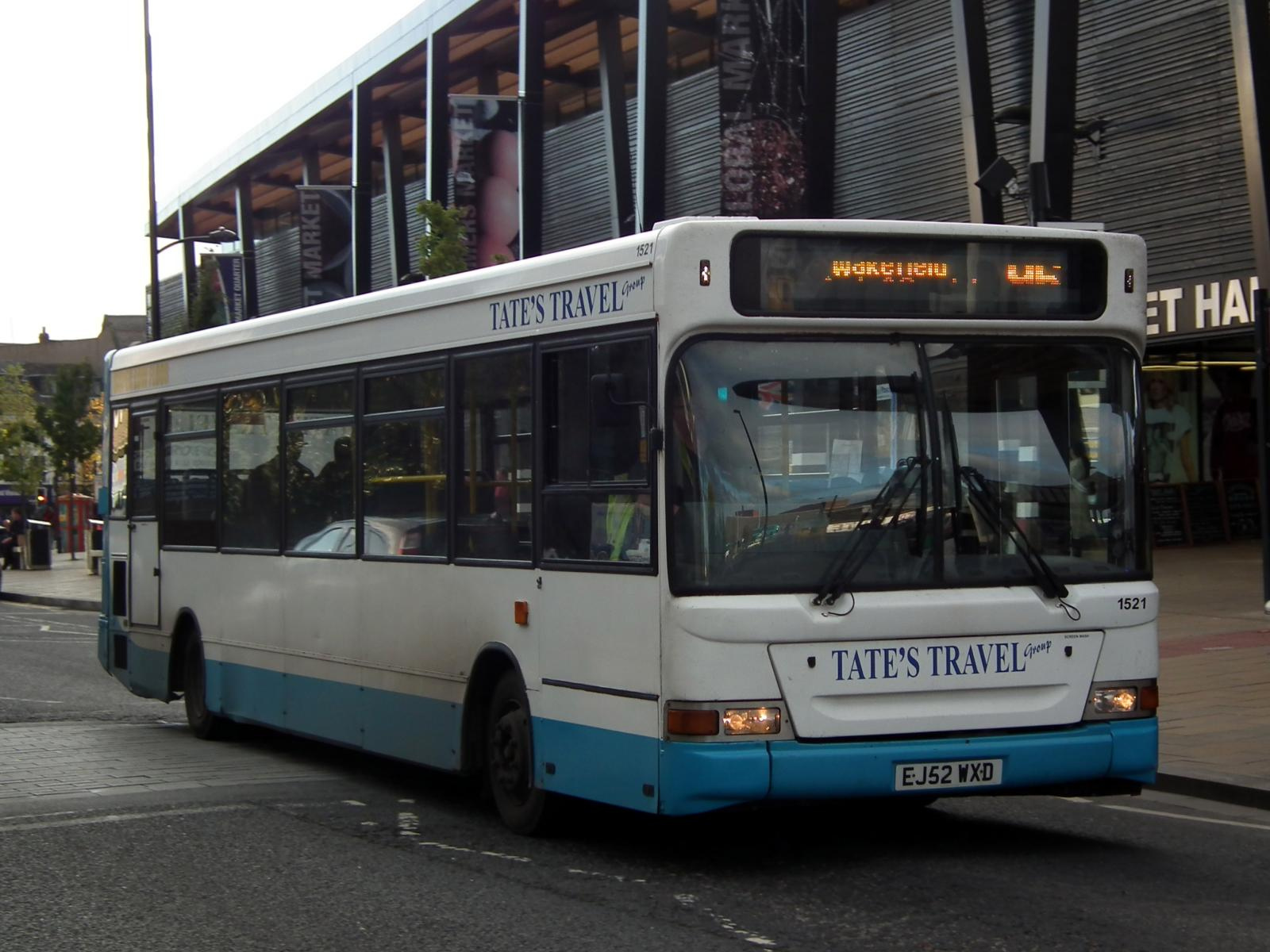
Plaxton Pointer 2-bodied Dennis Dart SLF in Wakefield in October 2013

Tates Travel was founded in 2003 by Graham Mallinson in Stocksbridge, when he purchased a minibus to run private hire journeys before running a school minibus service for pupils at Millhouse Green Primary school. Over the next two years, the company expanded its fleet to run school services before starting its first public bus service, route 18 between Barnsley and Mapplewell and relocating the depot to Dodworth in 2005.

In 2007 the depot again moved to Darton when the business of Stanley Gath Coaches, Dewsbury was purchased. Between 2007 and 2010, the company increased the number of services in the Barnsley area, with services also running to Wakefield, following Arriva Yorkshire withdrawing services between Wakefield and Barnsley in January 2010. Due to the expansion of services, the company moved once again in 2010 to a larger depot in Barugh Green.

In 2011, the company won several South Yorkshire Passenger Transport Executive contracts, including several services in the Penistone area from Stagecoach Yorkshire.

In 2012, the company won further contract but this time from the West Yorkshire Passenger Transport Executive. These were services operating from Wakefield to Hall Green, Hemsworth, Pontefract and South Elmsall which were all previously operated by Arriva Yorkshire.

In January 2013 Tates commenced operating further West Yorkshire Passenger Transport Executive services radiating from both Wakefield and Dewsbury, again were all previously operated by Arriva Yorkshire.

In April 2013 Tates commenced operating the Dewsbury Free Town Bus. In August 2013 Tates took delivery of its first coach.

On 8 February 2016, Tates Travel ceased trading after being placed in administration.

== Services ==
As at October 2013 Tates Travel operated 55 routes.

== Fleet ==
As the time of its February 2016 cessation, the fleet comprised 74 buses.
