= Midland (bus operator) =

West Midlands bus operator

- Company type: Private limited company
- Traded as: Choice Travel
- Industry: Bus service
- Founded: 1992
- Founder: Tom Young and Barrie Marsden
- Defunct: 2012
- Fate: Company merged and absorbed into Arriva Midlands
- Headquarters: Thurmaston, Leicestershire, United Kingdom (Arriva HQ)
- Area served: West Midlands
- Services: Public transport
- Owner: D&G Bus (until 2012); Arriva Midlands (2012–)
- Number of employees: 110+
- Parent: Arriva

Midland, previously known as Choice Travel, was a bus company operating mostly in the Wolverhampton and Walsall areas of the West Midlands. Some services also operated in the Staffordshire and Shropshire area.

== History ==
The company was originally started as Liyell Ltd trading as Midland Choice Travel established by ex-London Forest manager Tom Young and business partner Barrie Marsden in 1992 with two Leyland Leopard coaches and three Leyland Nationals in a lime green and yellow livery, from which the company got its name (LIme green YELLow). They first operated from a depot on Watery Lane, Willenhall owned by Howell Galvanisers. The first bus services operated were route 171 (Walsall - Leamore - Bloxwich - Mossley, and route 700 (Perton - Codsall High School). The original intention had been to develop services in either Leicester or Telford but the directors were persuaded that the core of the new bus service network would best be the most lucrative route lifted from a major plan to develop and expand Midland Red North operations into the Black Country, route 171. "Midland Choice Travel", as the company was originally known, recruited ex-London Forest manager Steve Deveraux and Trent Buses manager Keith Shayshutt. Over the next few years the business thrived; during the 1993 West Midlands Travel bus strike a fleet of 30 buses were hired from across the country to cover services. Soon after the strikes finished, Liyell dropped the "Midland" part of the Choice Travel name with an enlarged logo.

During the late 1990s, Choice Travel acquired the business of Metropolitan Omnibus (formed by a group of former Stevensons managers) and its network of routes throughout the Black Country on former Stevensons routes. The Metropolitan fleet of Mercedes and Dodge mini and midibuses soon sported the smart yellow of Choice, with the lime green and dark green exchanged for contrasting shades of blue. Former Stevensons MD and Metropolitan manager Julian Peddle bought a share in the company and it joined his "Status Bus & Coach Group" in 1999.

As part of Choice Travel's commitment to public transport development, it embarked on a new partnership with Centro and Travel West Midlands to launch the new Showcase route branded "Superline". Superline ran along the main arterial route between Walsall-Leamore-Bloxwich and Mossley, using their own respective service numbers (Choice 171 and TWM 301). To demonstrate their commitment to the venture, Choice purchased four new low-floor Optare Excel buses for the route, displacing existing buses to other routes.

Choice became the target of another buy-out when it was acquired by Stoke-on-Trent based D&G Bus. This enabled Choice to further update its fleet with newer low floor Dennis Darts (sporting Plaxton, East Lancs and Marshall bodies) and some mid life Mercedes-Benz midibuses. A new livery of D&G cream and blue was initially used.

In March 2009, fellow Walsall and Wolverhampton bus operator A2Z Travel had its licence revoked. At the time, they operated numerous routes with over thirty buses in the area, many of behalf of Centro. An agreement was struck at the last minute, which saw several of A2Z's routes and buses transfer to Choice Travel in Wednesfield, in addition to the Operations Manager of A2Z. Any trace of A2Z Travel was removed and replaced with the new fleetname of Midland. Initially, this was used just on former A2Z route, but in mid-2009 it was decided to adopt this as the new fleetname.

This coincided with a new look for the whole D&G brand, of a two-tone red livery. A concentrated effort was then launched to repaint the whole fleet and install digital destination equipment in all buses, something which was completed by 2010. As part of this scheme, buses also started being refurbished into a special Midland moquette.

In March 2010, Midland obtained the operations and most buses of Oldbury based bus company Midland Rider. Operations were transferred to the Wednesfield depot, where for a short period the companies' operations were kept apart. Most of the Midland Rider buses however were not low floor and were soon withdrawn, with all Midland Rider services becoming Midland operated by the summer. Included in the purchase was a relatively rare Leyland Lynx II, the only one operated in the West Midlands. (West Midlands Travel only ever operated the original Leyland Lynx).

== Arriva takeover ==
On 10 August 2012, it was announced that Midland had been acquired by Arriva Midlands. Midland's 110 staff will transfer to Arriva. Arriva plans to incorporate Midland's fleet of 61 buses into the Arriva fleet and operate it under the Arriva brand. The takeover came into effect on 23 September 2012. The Office of Fair Trading cleared the completed acquisition by Arriva Midlands North of the business and assets of Liyell trading as Midland in January 2013.

== Operations ==
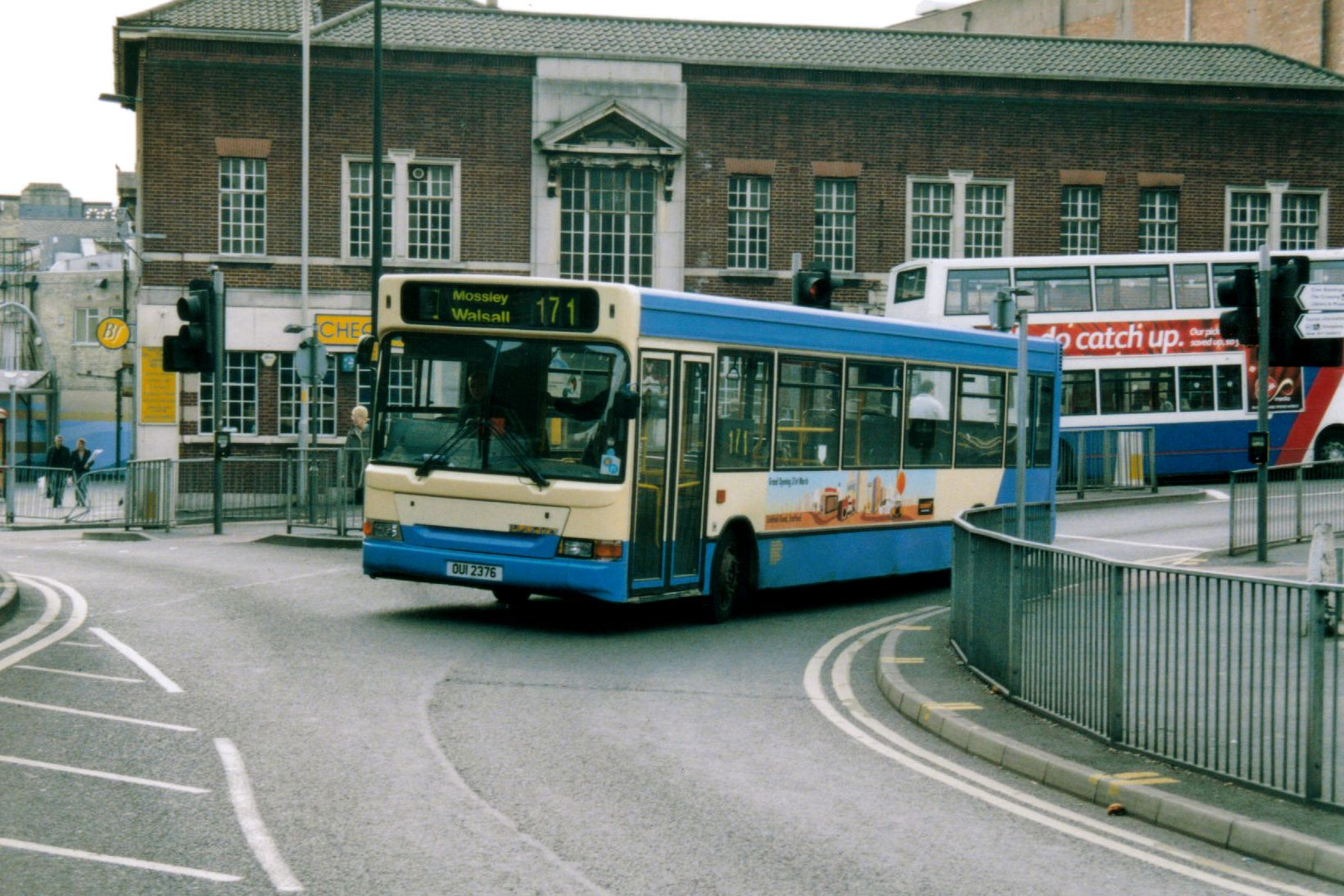
A Dennis Dart SLF of Choice Travel in blue and cream D&G Bus and Coach livery

The company was previously owned by Stoke-on-Trent based company D&G Bus. The company also operates services in other parts of the West Midlands as well as Staffordshire, Worcestershire and Shropshire from its base in Wednesfield.

The company operated mostly subsidised services, from Centro, Shropshire Council, Worcestershire County Council and Staffordshire County Council, with a handful of commercial routes operated.

The company employed approximately 110 bus drivers.

== Fleet ==
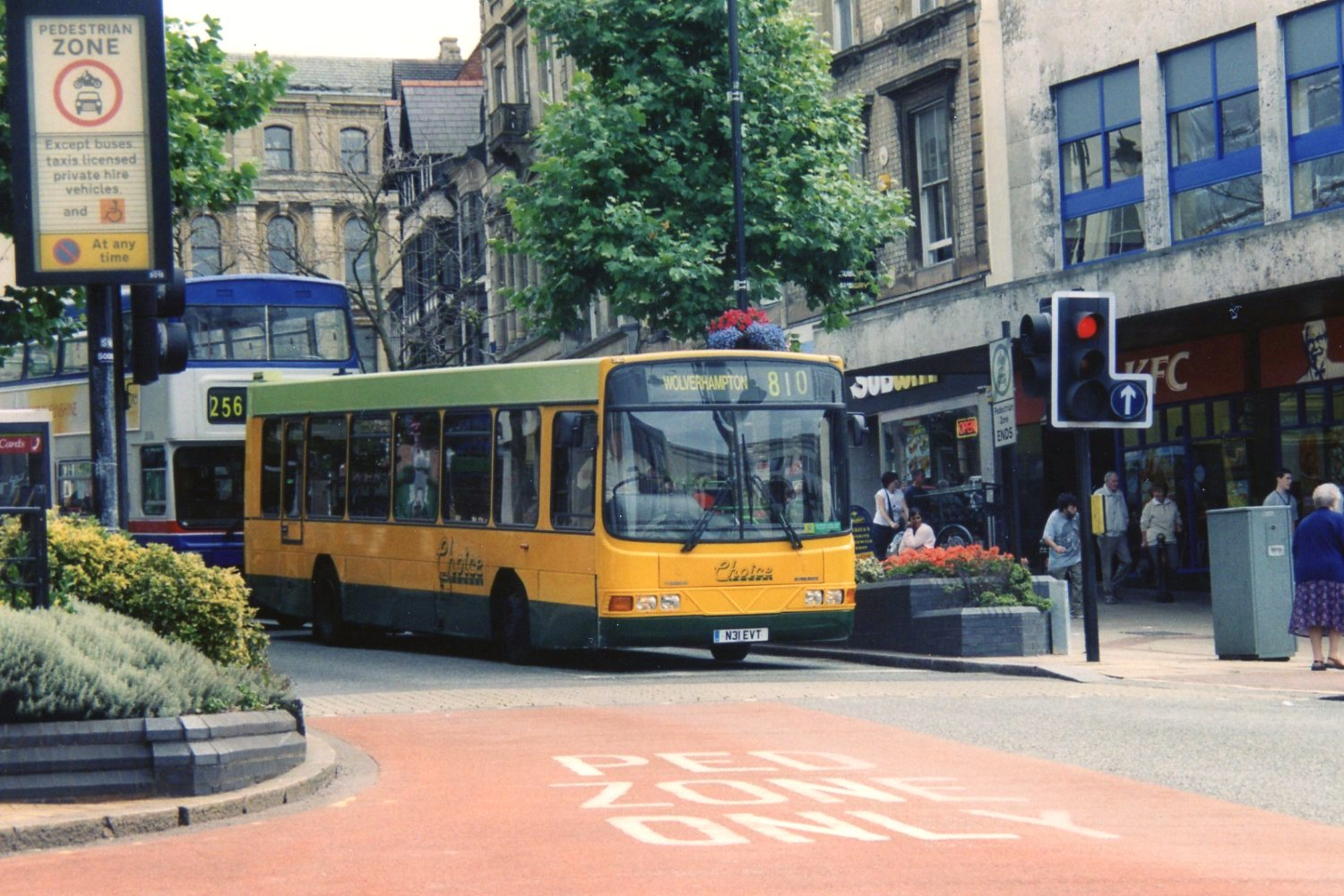
A Mercedes-Benz OH1416/Wright Urbanranger in Choice's original yellow and green livery in Wolverhampton

As of June 2012, the fleet consisted of:

- 41 Dennis Dart SLF (Bodied by Plaxton and Marshall)
- 17 Optare Solo
- 1 Optare Excel
- 2 Dennis Trident 2(East Lancs Body)

In the past the fleet was more varied. The original fleet consisted mostly of Leyland Nationals and Leopards, and Dodge minibuses were also popular. Choice's Managing Director, Tom Young, was never shy to experiment: unusual purchases were four Wright Urbanranger bodied Mercedes-Benz OH1416s, similar in body design to the comparable Endurance bodies on the Volvo B10B, and the fore-runner to the low floor version of the Mercedes-Benz O405, but which did not sell in large numbers following the advent of the low-floor bus. Young also purchased a pair of new step-entrance Northern Counties-bodied Dennis Darts for route 171; the ageing Leyland Nationals were withdrawn in favour of newer stock. The merger with Status Bus & Coach saw new types arrive, including Wright Handybus bodied Dennis Darts, Marshall bodied Dennis Falcons and former Ipswich Buses dual entrance Northern Counties bodied Dennis Falcons.

Fleet additions in 2012 included two double-deck Dennis Trident 2 buses and three Scania OmniLinks, all from Nottingham City Transport. The OmniLinks were transferred to D&G Bus, a sister company, in September 2012 in preparation for the takeover by Arriva. The Tridents, having only recently received Midland livery, were repainted a few weeks after acquisition by Arriva into corporate colours but only survived a few months with Arriva. Subsequently, Wednesfield depot operated standard Arriva buses including a batch of ex-Arriva London Alexander ALX400 bodied DAF DB250. A few of the ex-Midland buses would briefly operate with Diamond Bus after the acquisition of the Wednesfield operations.

== See also ==
- List of bus operators of the United Kingdom
