= Julian Peddle =

British bus proprietor (born 1954)

- Born: Julian Henry Peddle; November 1954 (age 71); Uxbridge, Middlesex, England
- Occupation: Businessman
- Years active: 1980s–present

Julian Henry Peddle (born November 1954) is an entrepreneur who has worked in the bus industry since the early 1980s, having owned or part-owned numerous bus companies. He spent 11 years as co-owner of Stevensons of Uttoxeter between 1983 and 1994, having previously been its traffic manager. During the late 1990s and early 2000s he ran Status Group, a group of small bus companies spread across England which included BakerBus, Choice Travel and MK Metro. He was a major shareholder in Tellings-Golden Miller and Centrebus Holdings before their sale to Arriva.

== Early life ==
Peddle was born in Uxbridge but grew up in Slough. He studied transport management at Loughborough University, working for various National Bus Company subsidiaries during holidays. He joined the co-ordination staff of Staffordshire County Council in 1978 and after 15 months, moved north to become traffic manager at 29-vehicle independent bus and coach operator Mayne's of Manchester. This proved impractical, however, so in March 1980 he moved back to Staffordshire to become traffic manager at Stevensons of Uttoxeter.

== Current interests and operations ==
=== Centrebus Group ===
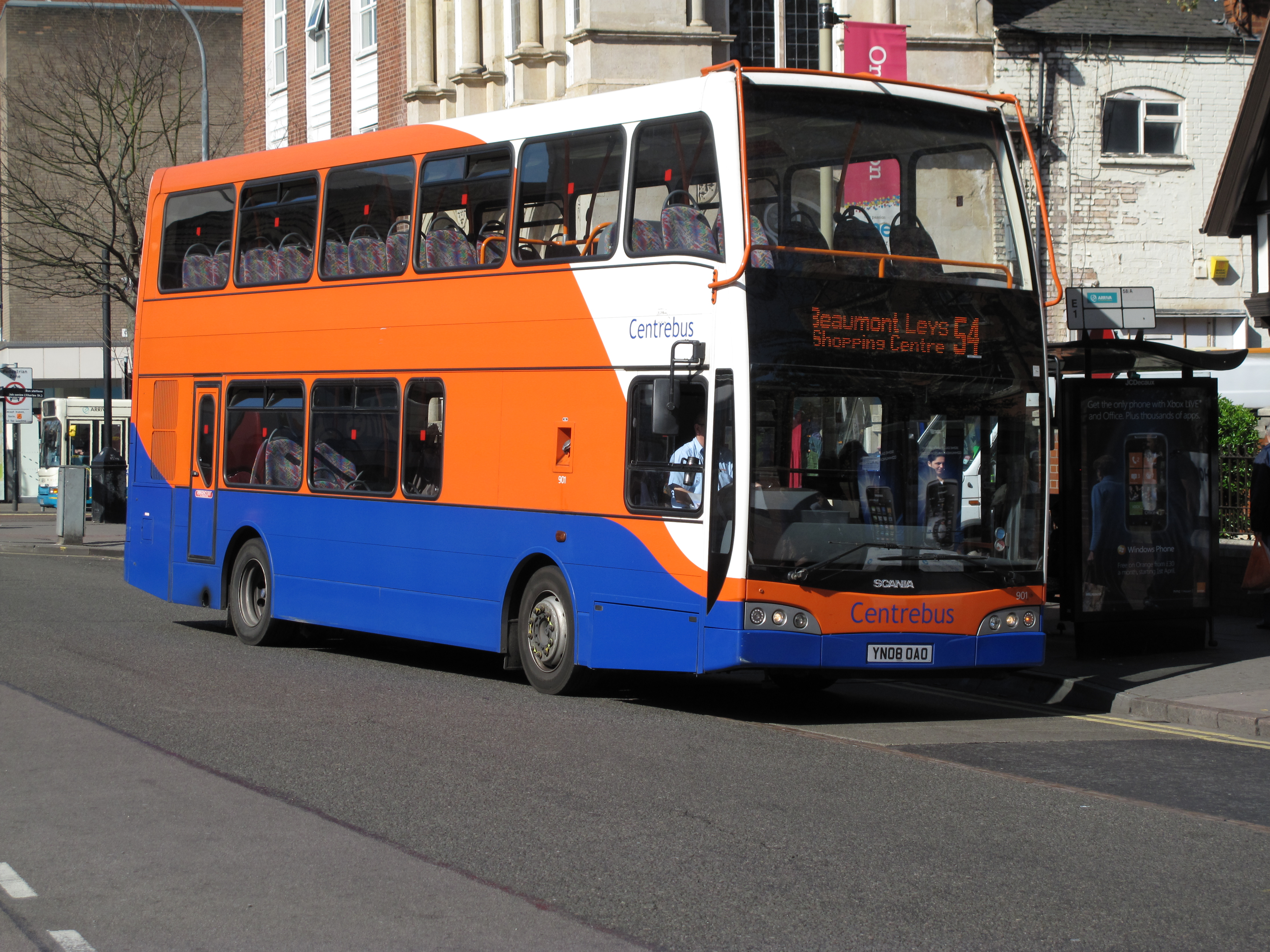
Centrebus East Lancs Olympus bodied Scania N230UD in Leicester in April 2011

In 2000, Peddle purchased Luton-based operator Lutonian in partnership with Chris Day of Red Rose Travel. Lutonian had in fact been taken over by Arriva Shires & Essex, but they had been forced to resell the company following a ruling by the Monopolies & Mergers Commission. The operation proved difficult to manage so the company was sold to Centrebus, a large independent formed in 2001 with its headquarters in Leicester. Peddle was impressed by the running of Centrebus and bought part of the company, which then began to grow rapidly. The St Albans depot of Sovereign Bus & Coach was bought in 2004, although it was sold on to Uno in 2008. The operations of MASS Engineering in Grantham were taken over in 2005, while Bowers Coaches was acquired in 2007.

A further development came in 2008, when Centrebus teamed up with Arriva to form Centrebus Holdings. The new joint operation took over the Huddersfield depot of Stagecoach Yorkshire and local independent K-Line Travel. Centrebus had initially intended to buy K-Line, whose manager Russel Arden had previously run Edinburgh Transport during its time as a joint operation with Stevensons, while Arriva had wished to buy Stagecoach's operations in the town. Arriva took a 40% stake in the joint company, which paid around £3 million to buy the two companies and used the trading name Huddersfield Bus Company for the former Stagecoach operations.

During 2008, Centrebus acquired the bus operations of Woods of Leicester, and in 2019, Peddle purchased the remaining shareholdings of D&G Bus from David Reeves, with the operations becoming part of Centrebus Group and managed from their offices in Leicester.

=== Select Bus Services ===
Peddle is a minority shareholder of Select Bus Services, who provide local bus services around Staffordshire.

== Former interests and operations ==
=== Stevensons of Uttoxeter ===
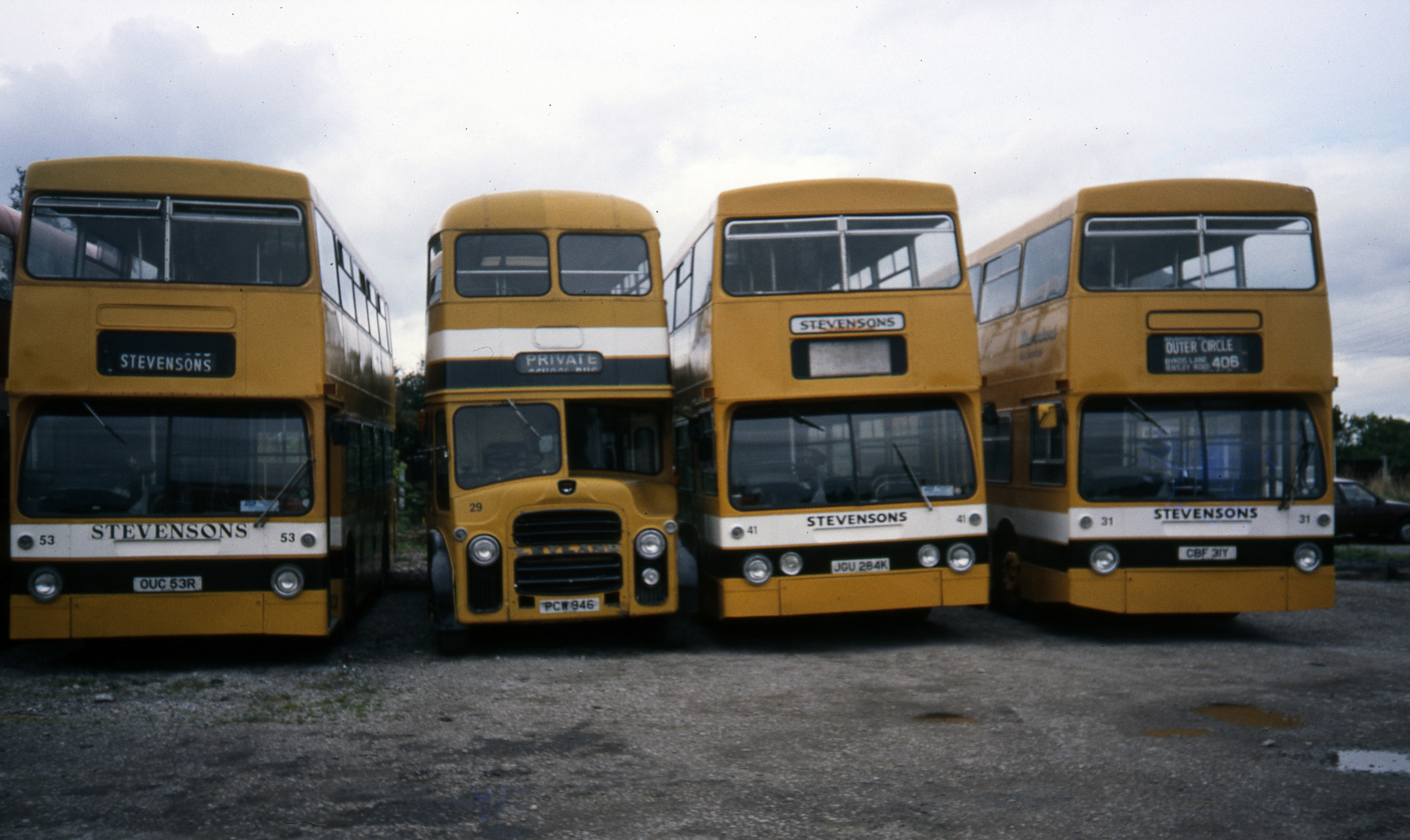
Stevensons of Uttoxeter fleet at Spath depot in 1988

Peddle joined Stevensons of Uttoxeter as traffic manager in March 1980 following a job offer from the company's co-owner David Stevenson. He bought half of Stevensons on the retirement of the company's other co-owner, George Stevenson, in 1983. When Peddle joined the company they owned 33 vehicles of which four were service buses. Under Peddle's co-ownership Stevensons expanded quickly, launching a network of tendered services around Uttoxeter which required no public subsidy. They also took over two small operators, Middleton's of Rugeley and Erewash Travel Services, in the early 1980s; the latter was sold to Nottingham City Transport in 1988.

In 1985, Peddle wrote a letter to the chief executive of his former employer Staffordshire County Council suggesting that he was interested in merging Stevensons with the heavily loss-making council-owned East Staffordshire operation based in Burton-on-Trent. The council's transport manager agreed to this and the two companies merged in October 1985, with the council owning 49% and Peddle and Stevenson the remaining 51%. It initially faced competition from Midland Fox, but this ceased in August 1987 when Stevensons bought 40% of the company following its privatisation, with Peddle being appointed to Fox's board. Stevensons took over two depots as part of the deal. Peddle credits the large numbers of Daimler Fleetline double-deckers bought from London Regional Transport with making this level of expansion possible, as they were cheap to buy and easy to run.

In 1989, Midland Fox was acquired by Drawlane. Fox's managing director, David Martin, arranged to move Peddle to another Drawlane subsidiary, Manchester-based Bee Line Buzz Company, for a year to reduce losses there. During this time, he reduced average losses from £90,000 to £3,000 per month.

In January 1991 Bee Line's depot in Stockport was closed by Drawlane. Two of its former managers asked Peddle to reopen it. Peddle paid for a subsidiary of Stevensons, called Pacer, to be formed to take this on. Pacer ran until September 1992, when it was taken over by Potteries Motor Traction in exchange for Potteries' routes in Wolverhampton.

In June 1994, following stiff competition with West Midlands Travel in the Black Country, Staffordshire County Council announced it intended to sell its share in Stevensons. By this point, Stevensons owned 270 buses and were the largest independent bus operator in the United Kingdom. Peddle did not want to buy the council's shares as this would have cost him £4.5 million, so he and David Stevenson instead agreed to sell the entire company to Drawlane's successor British Bus.

=== Rhondda Buses ===
In December 1991, National Welsh collapsed. Stevensons, British Bus, Potteries and Peddle himself formed a consortium called Rhondda Buses to take over the former National Welsh depot at Porth in February 1992. The company initially used the license of Tellings-Golden Miller, a subsidiary of Midland Fox which owned the license of a defunct South Wales independent, CK Coaches. A second depot at Aberdare was also acquired but quickly sold on to Offa Demo, a company owned by Cynon Valley Travel which sold out to neighbouring Red & White Services after a year. Western Travel, owners of Red & White, was later sold a minority stake in Rhondda Buses.

Many of the players in the consortium were themselves sold to larger groups. Badgerline took over Potteries; Stagecoach Holdings purchased Western Travel; and British Bus was taken over by the Cowie Group in 1996. In December 1997, the entire company was taken over by Stagecoach, despite a rival bid from Badgerline's successor FirstGroup.

An unusual side-effect of Stevenson's involvement in Rhondda Buses saw Stevensons take a share in Edinburgh Transport in 1993. This was the bus division of Silver Coach Lines, a company run by the former manager of National Welsh's Barry depot. The operation was closed down in 1994 when the GRT Group took over two large operators in Edinburgh, Lowland Scottish and Midland Scottish.

=== Tellings-Golden Miller ===
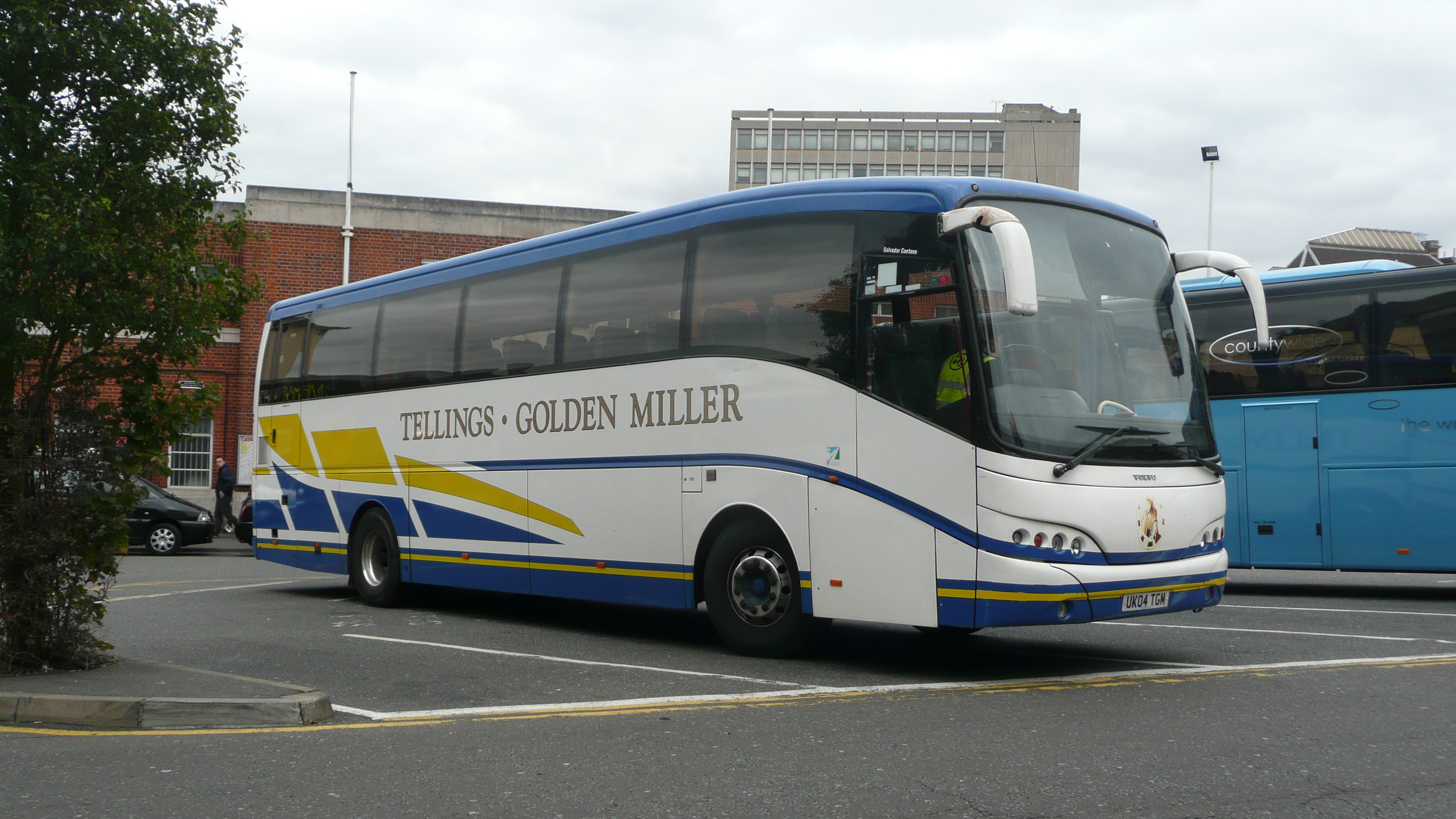
Tellings-Golden Miller Caetano Enigma bodied Volvo B12B in Woking in October 2009

In 1993, British Bus wished to sell Tellings-Golden Miller (TGM), and because of Peddle's involvement with TGM during the Rhondda Buses venture its former owner Stephen Telling approached him with a view to reacquiring the company. Peddle agreed to fund the buyout and took a minority share in the company. He also provided the money for TGM's takeover of Annfield Plain based Classic Coaches and smaller stakes in Burton's of Haverhill and The Linkline.

TGM joined Peddle's Status Group on its formation in 1999, and he continued to own 28% of the company even after Status was broken up. The company released 30% of its shares on the Alternative Investment Market in 2003, and quickly bought the remaining shares in Burton's and The Linkline, as well as acquiring the former Arriva Colchester operation. Peddle's share had reduced to just over 20% by April 2006 as much of the company had been released on AIM. He bought a further 50,000 shares in TGM in May 2006 and another 55,000 shares in October 2006. In December 2007, Arriva purchased TGM including Peddle's shares.

=== MK Metro ===
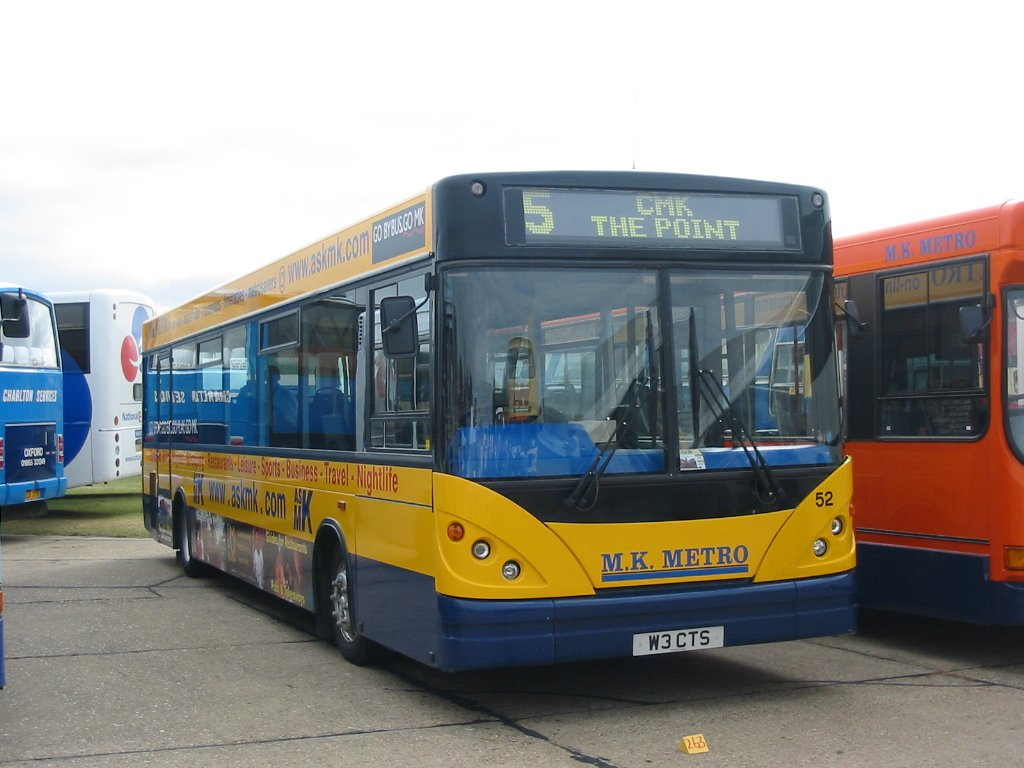
MK Metro Caetano Nimbus bodied Dennis Dart in September 2004

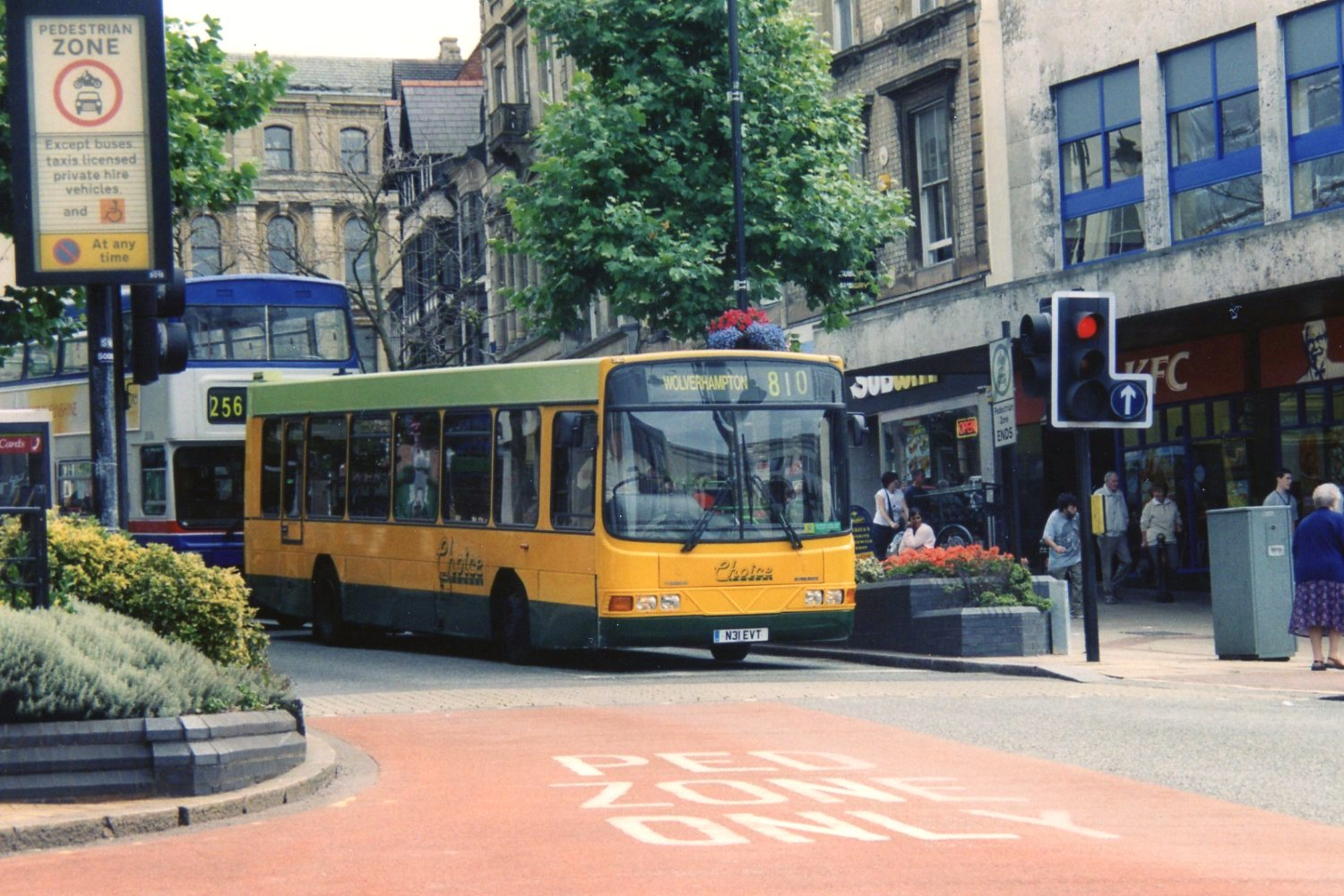
Choice Travel Wright UrbanRanger bodied Mercedes-Benz OH1416 in Wolverhampton in August 2003

In 1997, Peddle took over two former Cambus depots at Huntingdon and Milton Keynes. These had been acquired along with the rest of Cambus by Stagecoach Holdings in 1995, but the Office of Fair Trading had instructed Stagecoach to sell two depots to reduce its dominance in the region. They also stipulated that both depots must be sold to the same buyer. Peddle proved to be the only interested party and duly took over the operation in June 1997. The operations were quickly rebranded as MK Metro in Milton Keynes and Premier Buses in Huntingdon. He was unable to fund new vehicles for both, and sold Premier to Blazefield Holdings in early 1998, who integrated the company as part of Sovereign Bus & Coach.

MK Metro was owned by Peddle for nine years, during which time passenger numbers increased by 120% and the company became profitable. Between 1998 and 2003, ridership rose by 63% following the introduction of new buses and ticketing schemes. He sold the company to Arriva Shires & Essex in 2006, citing disagreement between authorities as a major factor.

=== Choice Travel ===
Following Stevensons' sale, Peddle had set up a company called Metropolitan Omnibus to run on many former Stevensons routes in the West Midlands. In 1997, Metropolitan was taken over by Choice Travel, who Peddle bought a small share in. He also bought minority shares in BakerBus and Burnley-based Border Buses. All three of these companies joined Peddle's Status Bus & Coach on its formation in 1999, as did TGM and their subsidiaries Classic Coaches and Burton's, MK Metro and coach company The Londoners. The aim was to reduce costs by buying vehicles and supplies in bulk at cheaper costs while retaining local control. Few others agreed that this was practical and the group broke up, selling BakerBus to its management, Border Buses to Northern Blue and closing The Londoners altogether.

In 2005, Choice Travel's managing director Tom Young wanted to retire, and with no obvious successor in the company, sold it to independent D&G Bus, based in nearby Adderley Green. In 2006, Peddle purchased a minority stake in D&G following the death of its co-founder Gerald Henderson. Around the same time, Peddle also bought a 30% stake in South Lancs Travel, which was later was sold to Rotala in 2015. In December 2019, Peddle purchased the remaining 74% in D&G Bus.

=== Midland Classic ===
Peddle was a shareholder of Burton-upon-Trent bus company Midland Classic until August 2022, when it was sold to Rotala.

== Preserved vehicles ==
Peddle owned preserved Leyland PD3 PAX466F with lowbridge Massey Brothers bodywork, new to Bedwas & Machen UDC, later operated by Rhymney Valley, and preserved in the livery of Stevensons, with whom it operated during Peddle's time as manager. PAX466F is now owned by the Cardiff Transport Preservation Group and has regained its original Bedwas & Machen UDC livery.
