= MK Metro =

Bus operator in Milton Keynes, Buckinghamshire

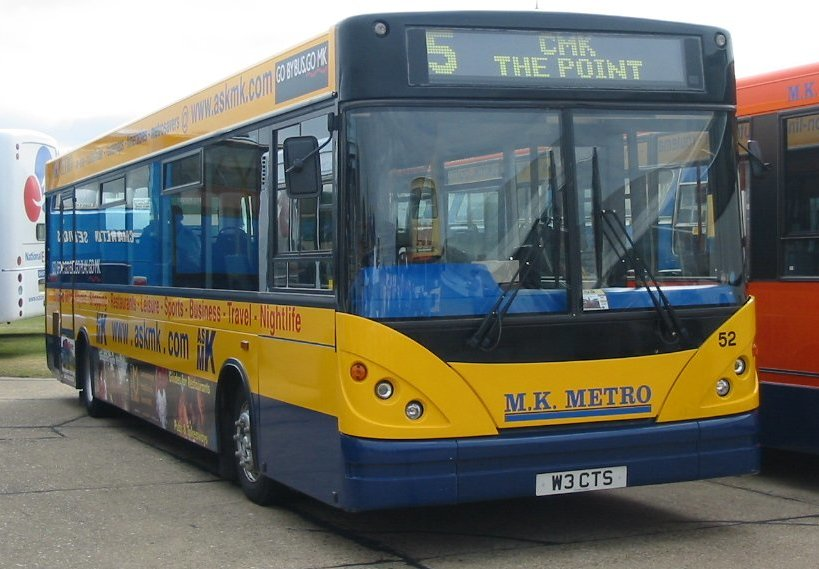
- Caetano Nimbus bodied Dennis Dart at Showbus 2004
- Parent: Premier Buses (1997–2006); Arriva (2006–2010)
- Founded: 2 May 1997; 29 years ago
- Ceased operation: 25 April 2010; 16 years ago
- Headquarters: Milton Keynes
- Service area: Bedfordshire; Buckinghamshire; Northamptonshire
- Service type: Bus
- Fleet: 120 (February 2006)
- Operator: Arriva Shires & Essex
- Chief executive: Nigel Snow
- Website: www.mkmetro.co.uk/ www.arrivabus.co.uk/mkstar

MK Metro was a bus company operating in Milton Keynes from 1997 until 2010.

== History ==
The original MK Metro logo

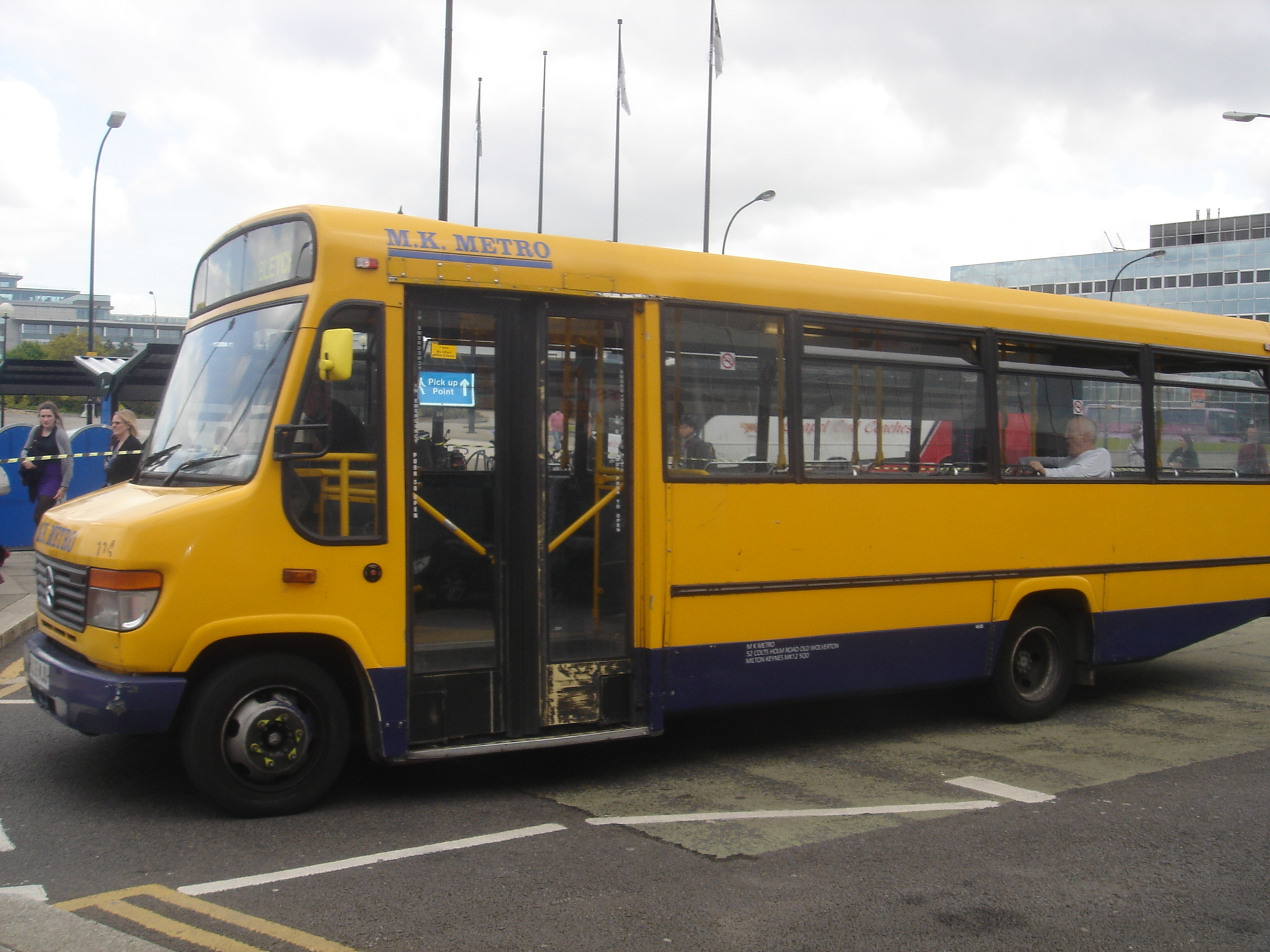
Mercedes-Benz midibus at Milton Keynes station in May 2009

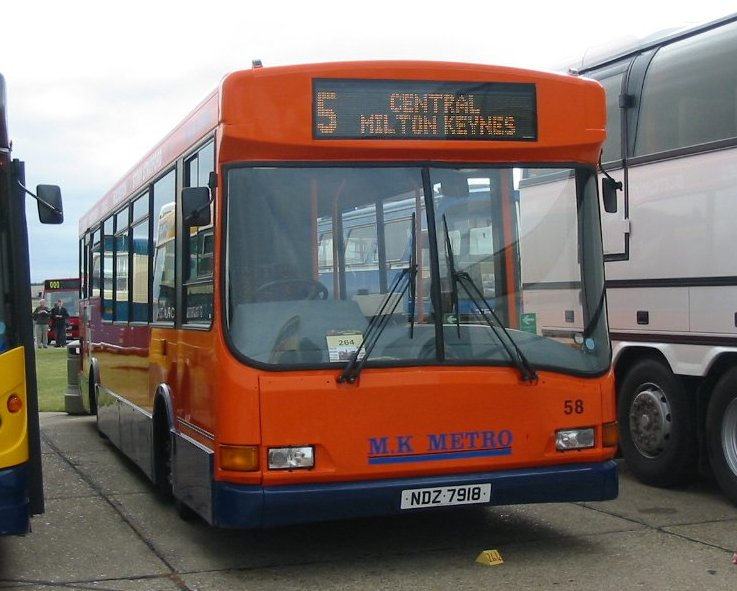
UVG Urbanstar bodied Dennis Dart

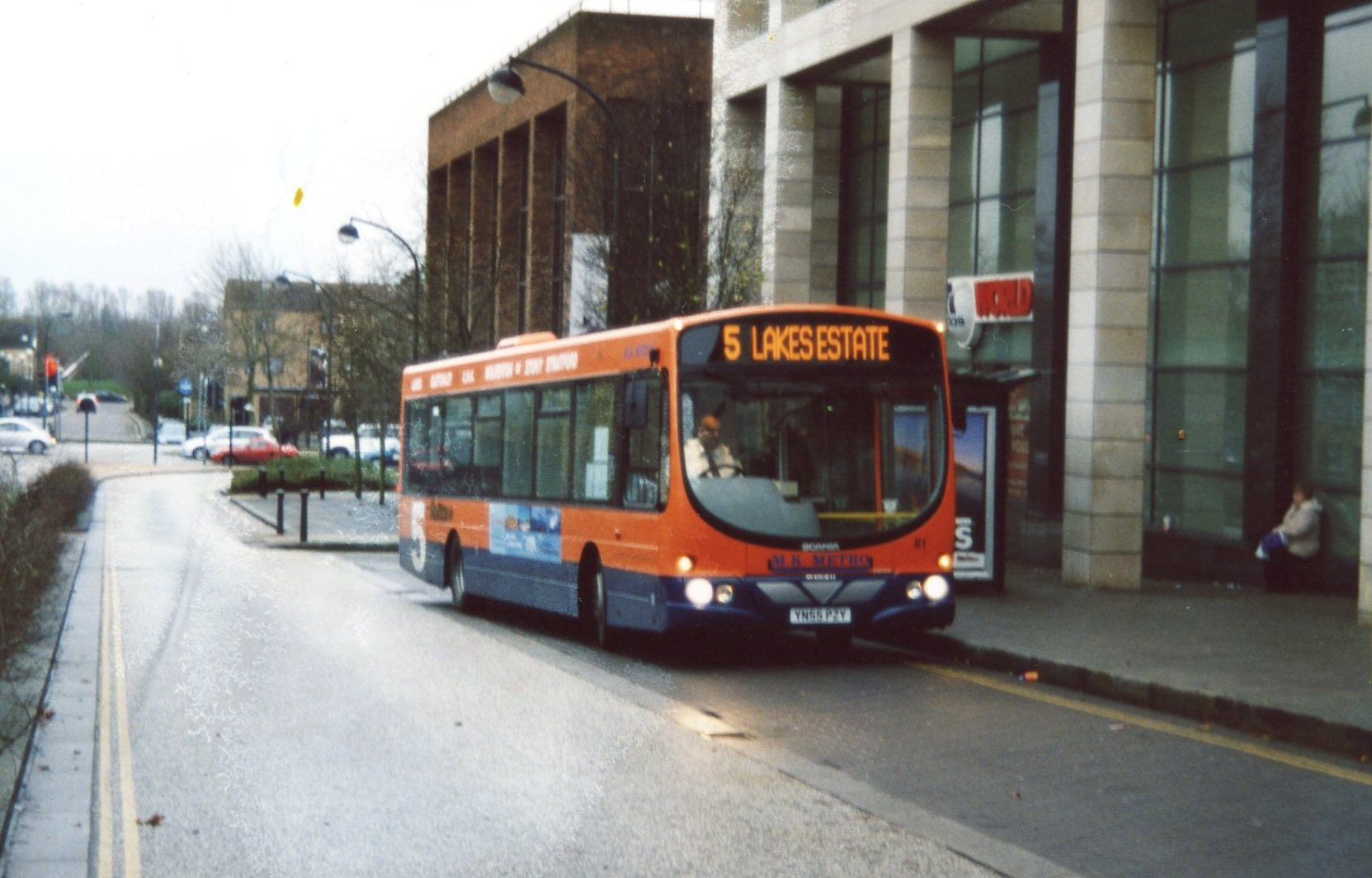
Wright Solar bodied Scania L94UB branded for route 5 in Central Milton Keynes shortly after the takeover by Arriva

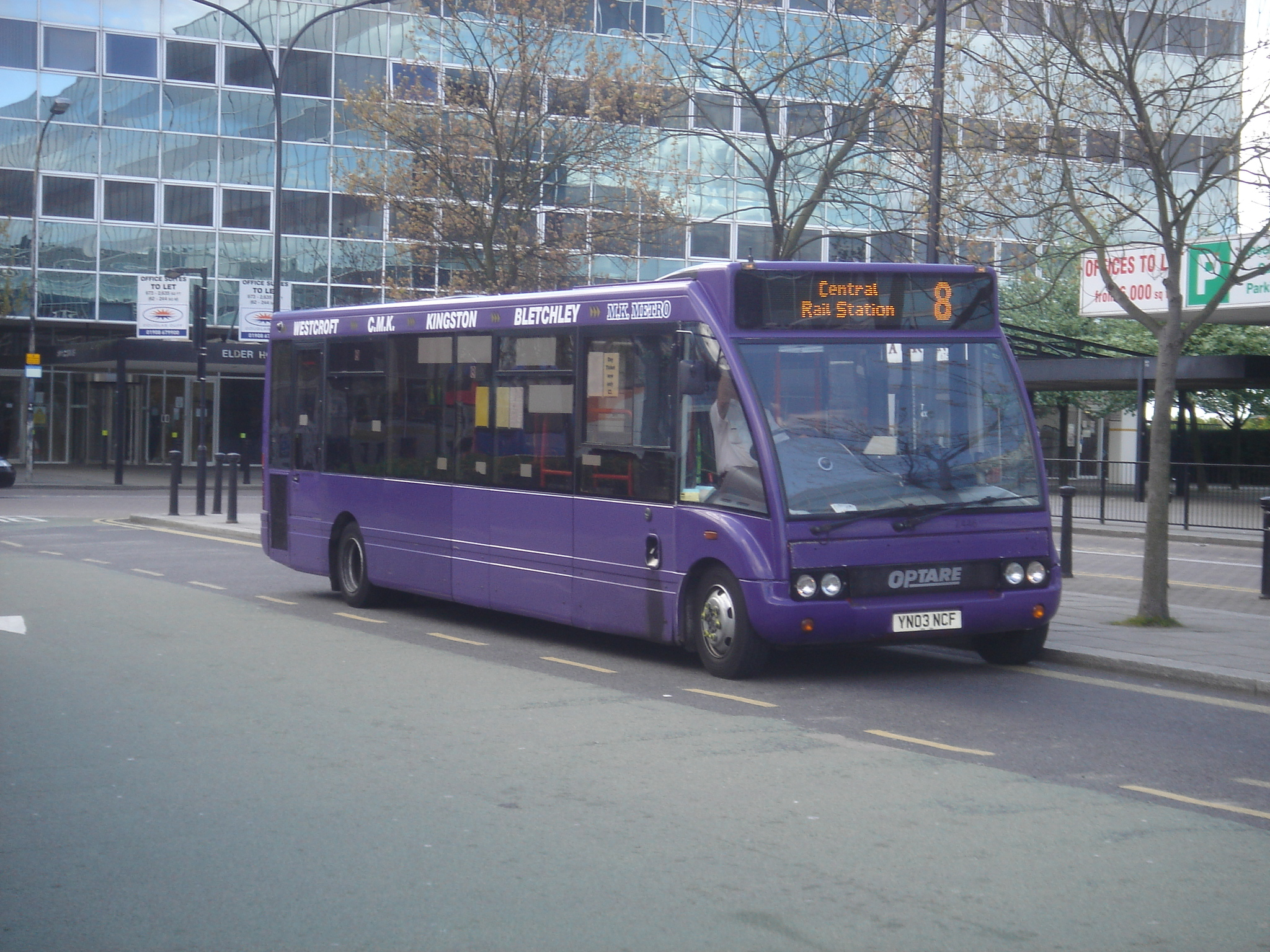
Optare Solo on high-frequency route 8 at Milton Keynes station in early 2009

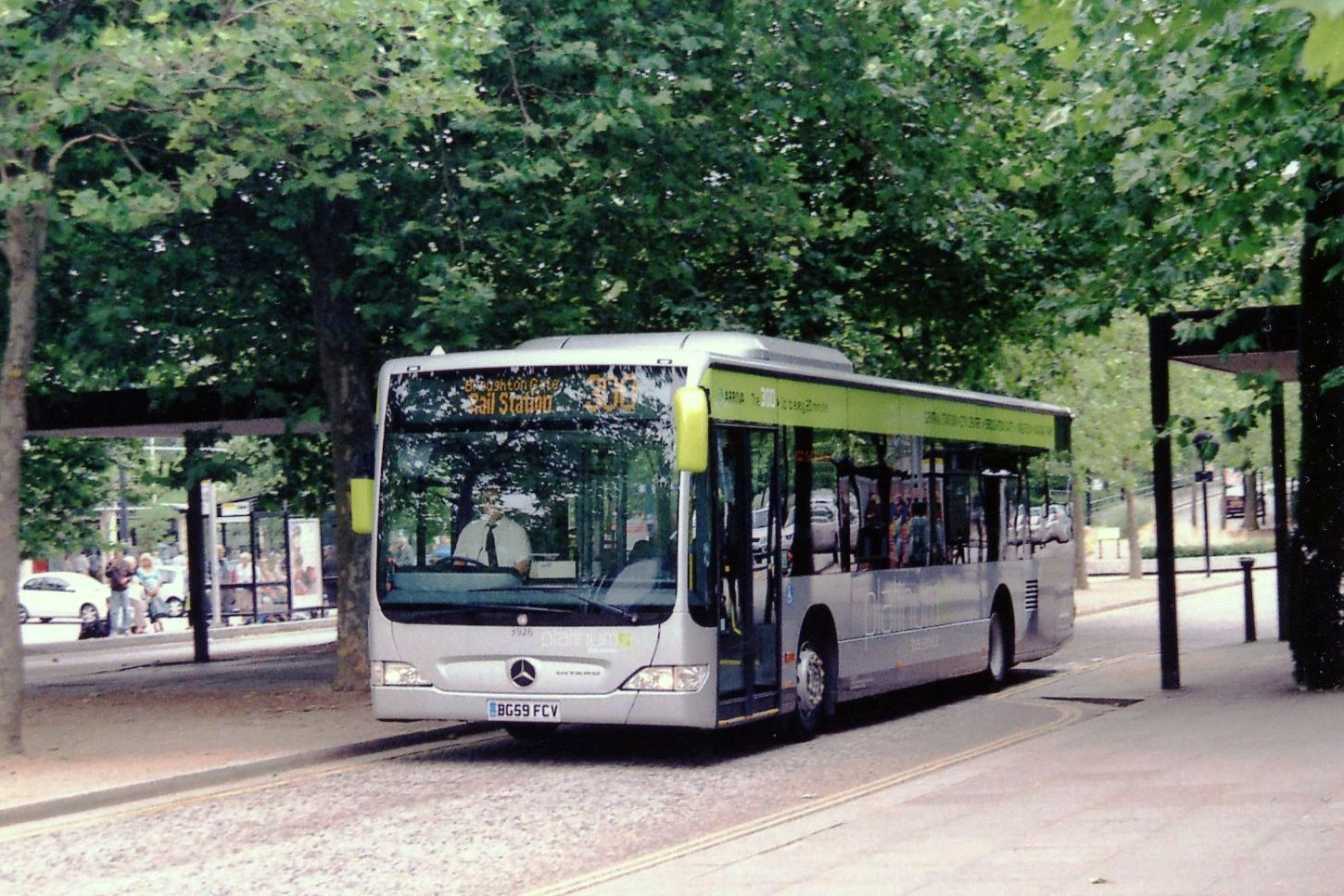
Mercedes-Benz Citaro in a dedicated silver livery on route 300 after the Arriva takeover

In 1997, Stagecoach was ordered by the Office of Fair Trading to divest of its operations in Milton Keynes and Huntingdon. This followed an investigation in 1996 into its acquisition of Cambus Holdings which was deemed to have led to an unacceptable monopoly of bus operations in Cambridgeshire, Corby, East Northamptonshire, Kettering, Wellingborough, Bedford and Mid Bedfordshire.

The assets of Milton Keynes Citybus were purchased on 2 May 1997 by bus entrepreneur Julian Peddle, using a new company Premier Buses Limited both to operate in Huntingdon (under the Premier Buses brand name) and also as a holding company with which to purchase MK Metro. The operation was rebranded as MK Metro with a bright yellow and blue livery introduced.

In February 2006, Premier Buses Limited was purchased by Arriva, with the MK Metro business retained as an independent brand within its Arriva Shires & Essex subsidiary. A new logo introduced in 2007.

On 25 April 2010, the Arriva brand and livery were introduced. Milton Keynes services began to operate under the sub brand of MK Star, and the change of name coincided with a number of controversial service changes. Among these services included the 'platinum MK' route brand, introducing a fleet of silver Mercedes-Benz Citaros on service 300 between Central Milton Keynes and the Magna Park logistics centre.

== Fleet ==
As of the February 2006 takeover by Arriva, the MK Metro fleet consisted of 120 buses. The fleet ranged from mainly Dennis Darts (high floor and low floor, with a variety of bodywork), to Mercedes-Benz minibuses and Optare Solos. Double-decker Optare Spectras, and Wright Solar bodied Scania L94UBs were also operated.

=== Fleet summary ===
- Dennis Dart
- Dennis Dart SLF
- VDL SB120
- Mercedes-Benz Vario
- Optare Solo
- Optare Spectra
- Scania L94UB
- Alexander Dennis Enviro300

== Routes ==
MK Metro ran over 30 services. Most routes passed through or served Central Milton Keynes. However, routes 16 and 30/31 did not. The routes were generally numbered from 1 to 30, although there were some omissions and some routes in the 30s, as well as a new service numbered 300.

The key services were numbered 1 to 8, and ran every 10 to 20 minutes. Key services ran through the busiest parts of the city, for example to Bletchley and the District centres. Intermediate services ran from every 20 minutes up to every hour. These routes cover areas in more detail, for example serving through the grid squares, while key services mostly ran on the main roads. The other routes ran at a frequency of every hour or less. These services linked locations outside Milton Keynes into the city, or linked neighbourhoods into the nearest centre.

Note that this list of routes is for historical interest. It is not a list of the current routes operated by Arriva Shires & Essex.

=== Former key services ===
- 1 / B / C: City Centre – Green Park – Newport Pagnell – Olney – Bedford / Northampton
- 2: Westcroft – Oxley Park – Grange Farm – City Centre – Willen – Poets Estate – Newport Pagnell
- 4 / A / E: Wolverton – Stony Stratford – City Centre – Hospital – Whaddon Way – Bletchley
- 5 / E: Wolverton – Bradville – City Centre – Hospital – Bletchley – Lakes Estate
- 7 / E: Wolverton – Stantonbury – City Centre – Bletchley – Newton Longville / Lakes Estate
- 7 A: Wolverton – Great Linford – Neath Hill – City Centre
- 8: Westcroft – Shenley Brook End – City Centre – Kingston – Bletchley / Woburn Sands

=== Intermediate services ===
These routes were operated by MK Metro after its take-over by Arriva, but before the rebranding and new timetable launch on 24 April 2010.

- 2E: Wolverton – Heelands – City Centre – Willen – Poets Estate – Newport Pagnell
- 3E: Wolverton – Great Linford – City Centre – Shenley Church End – Furzton – Westcroft
- 6 / A: Wolverton / Bradville – Heelands – City Centre – Hospital- Emerson Valley – Bletchley
- 9 / A: City Centre – Shenley Lodge – Furzton – West Bletchley – Bletchley
- 12: Wolverton – Greenleys – Bradwell – City Centre – Kents Hill – Open University – Caldecotte
- 20: Bletchley – Tattenhoe – Westcroft – City Centre – Hospital – Walnut Tree
- 26E: Bletchley – Furzton – City Centre – Walnut Tree – Kingston Centre
- 29: Bletchley – Hospital – Oldbrook – City Centre – Crownhill – Shenley Church End
- 32: City Centre – Buckingham – Little Tingewick (peak hours)
- 39: Bletchley – Whaddon Way – Oldbrook – City Centre – Crownhill – Shenley Church End
- 300: City Centre – Broughton Gate – Kingston / Magna Park

=== Other former services ===
- 11: Milton Keynes – Monkston – Kingston – Woburn Sands – Bow Brickhill – Bletchley
- 13: Stony Stratford – Stantonbury – City Centre – Bletchley – Lakes Estate
- 14: City Centre – Stony Stratford – Old Stratford – Deanshanger / Wicken
- 16: Bletchley – West Bletchley – Emerson Valley – Westcroft
- 17A: Milton Keynes – Moulsoe – Cranfield
- 17B: City Centre – Great Linford – Newport Pagnell – Cranfield
- 18: City Centre – Woolstone – Woughton Park – Simpson – Bletchley
- 30 / 31: Newport Pagnell – Wolverton – Stony Stratford – Bletchley
- 32A: Buckingham Town Service
- 33: Milton Keynes – Blue Bridge – Wolverton – Hanslope – Roade – Northampton
- (NN)11 Northampton – Kingsley – Parklands – Links View – Kingsley – Northampton (only serves Links View on return from Parklands)
- (NN)21 Northampton – University Avenue Campus – Kingsthorpe – University Park Campus (ceased due to contract loss)
