= BakerBus =

Bus fleet operated by Bakers Coaches in Staffordshire, England

BakerBus / Bakers Coaches

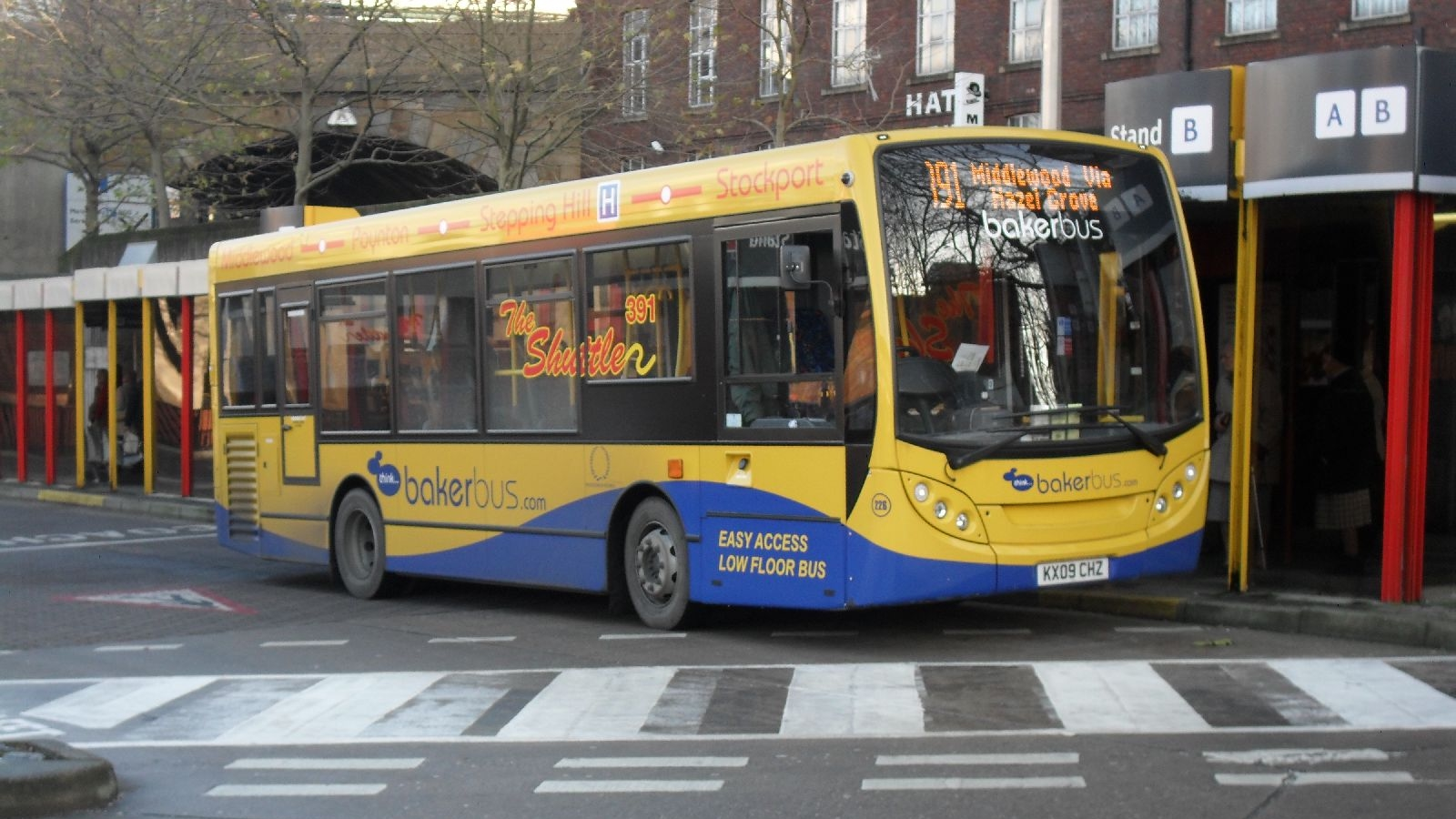
- Alexander Dennis Enviro200 at Stockport bus station in December 2009
- Parent: Island Fortitude
- Founded: 1936; 89 years ago
- Ceased operation: 2018
- Headquarters: Biddulph
- Service area: Staffordshire; Cheshire; Shropshire
- Service type: Bus & coach services
- Fleet: 70

BakerBus was the trading name used by the bus fleet of Bakers Coaches, a bus and coach operator based in Biddulph, Staffordshire, England. Formed as a coach operator in 1936, they grew to operate a fleet of around 50 vehicles on local bus services and coach hire work, but after several changes of ownership, ceased operation in 2018.

== History ==
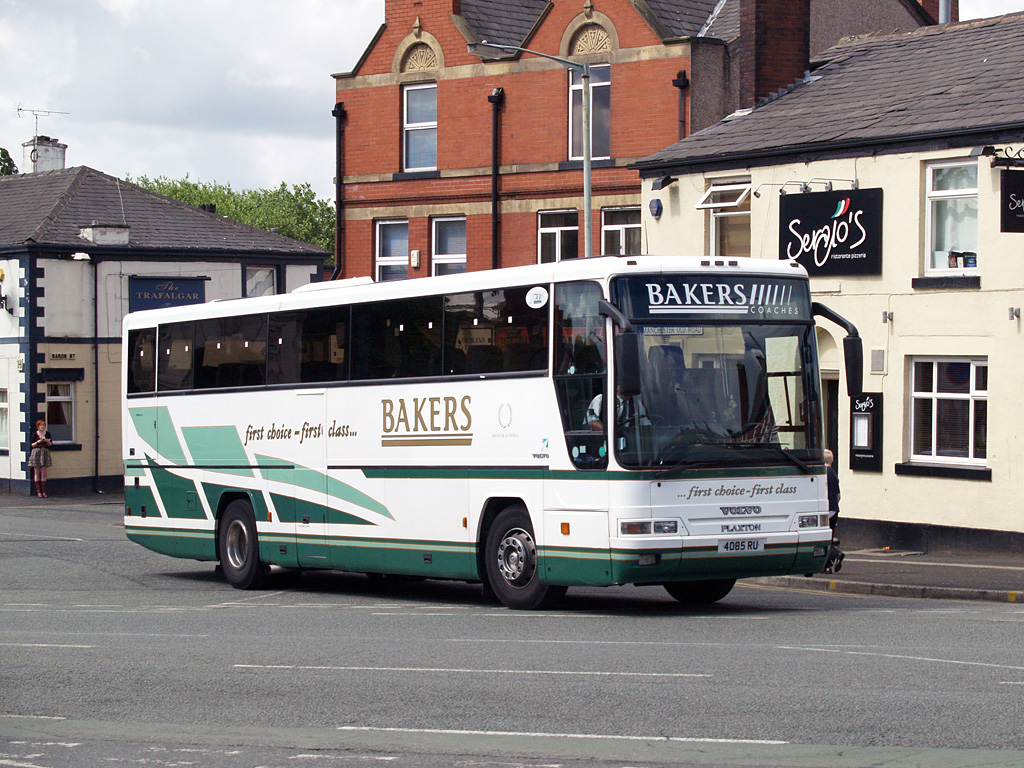
Plaxton bodied Volvo B10M-62 in June 2008

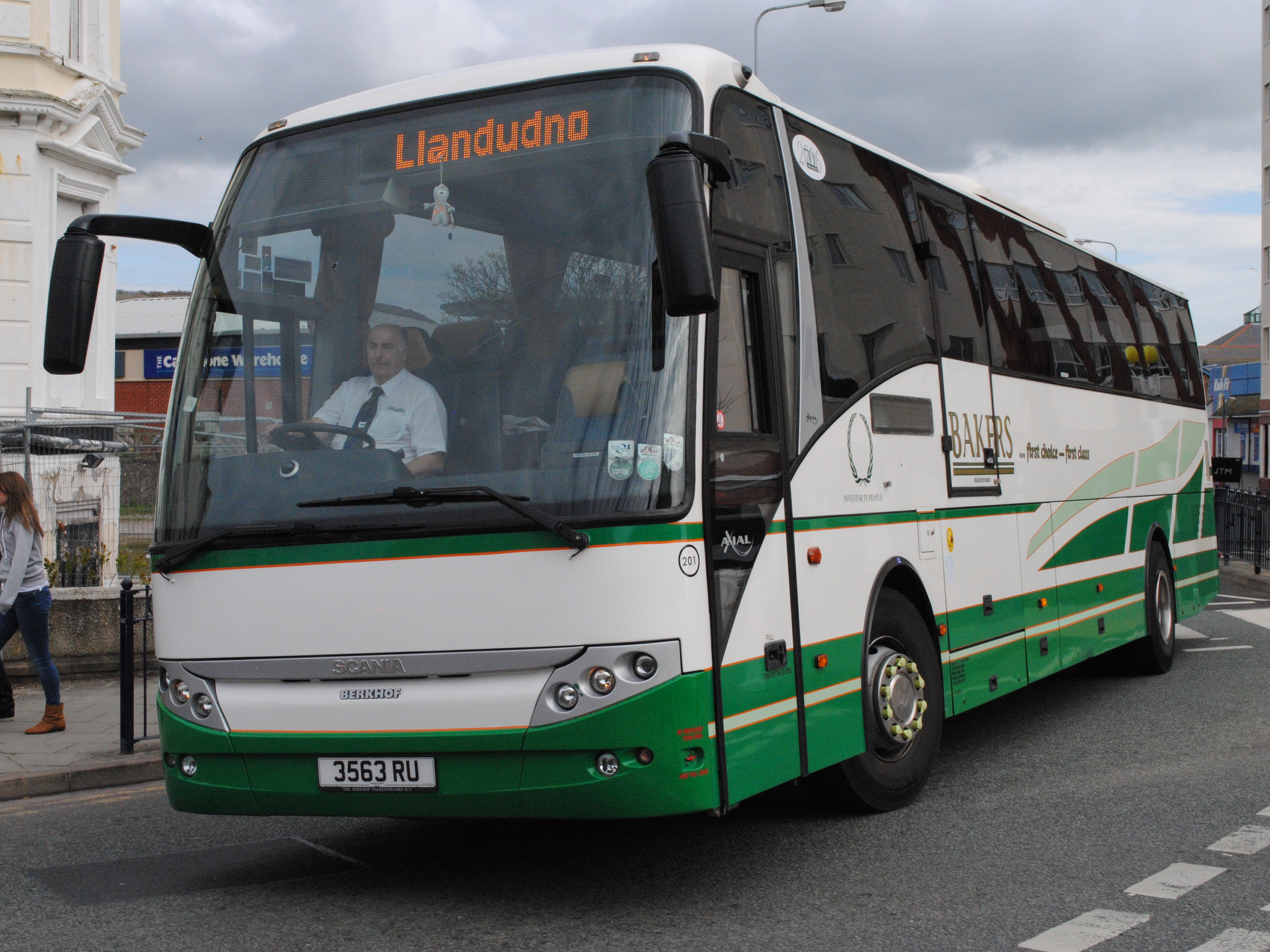
VDL Berkhof bodied Scania K114EB in Llandudno in May 2013

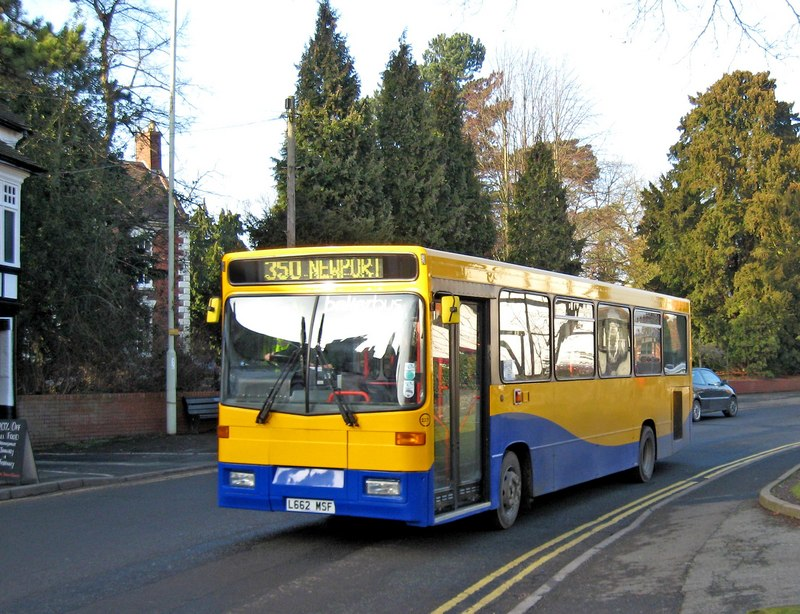
Alexander Dash bodied Volvo B6 in Newport in February 2010

Bakers Coaches was founded in 1936 by James Baker operating chauffeured car services, before purchasing a small fleet of coaches in 1967. In 1990 it diversified into bus operation with the launch of the "China Link" service connecting major pottery factories in Stoke-on-Trent for visitors to the area. It was withdrawn after three years. The company then launched an off-peak service between Leek and Buxton which was also later withdrawn.

In 1998 Bakers' were awarded Cheshire County Council contracted route 27 between Macclesfield and Knutsford. The route was initially operated every two hours with one bus, but was doubled in frequency in 1999. The contract was lost in 2008. Contracted journeys on route 99 (Biddulph – Congleton) were also taken over in 1998. The company joined Julian Peddle's newly formed Status Group in 1999, and the trading name BakerBus was adopted for local services. The company left Status Group in 2002.

In 2001, two new routes were started, both to the AstraZeneca factory near Alderley Edge. Both were withdrawn in 2007 as passenger numbers had fallen and AstraZeneca withdrew funding. However the company's route 99 was made fully commercial in 2006 and extended to operate to Macclesfield and continued to serve the AstraZeneca site at nearby Hurdsfield.

In September 2004, First Potteries had its operator licence cut, and abandoned several routes with BakerBus taking over three routes in the Newcastle-under-Lyme area, losing one after three years but retaining the other two routes, 33 and 33A Newcastle-under-Lyme – Westlands on a long-term basis. They were registered commercially, and eventually taken over by D&G Bus. It also gained route 77 between Hanley and Congleton, which it also registered commercially. This too, was taken over by D&G Bus, but is now abandoned. In February 2005 a new limited stop route, X1, was launched between Hanley, Stoke-on-Trent railway station and Stafford. It was funded by Staffordshire University, whose campus it served. Once the university closed the Beaconsfield campus, the service was withdrawn.

From 2006, route X1 covered for the suspended train service between Stafford and Stone, Barlaston and Wedgwood, with funding from Central Trains; Stone had its services restored in 2008, but the others were still served only by the bus. At the same time the X1 service ceased to operate into Stafford Town Centre, and now terminated at the Staffordshire University campus at Beaconside. The section between Stafford town centre and Stafford station was withdrawn in 2009 when funding from Central Trains' successor London Midland ceased.

In autumn 2007 Bakers took over the operations of Niddrie Coaches of Middlewich. In 2007 the contract to operate route 27 on Monday to Saturday was lost, but Sunday operations on the route were retained, and extended to serve Tatton Park. Bakers also gained tendered route 108, between Leek and Stockport, on a Sunday. A new network of town services in Congleton, branded as Beartown Bus with a new green livery, was awarded by the council to BakerBus from August 2007. Three new Plaxton Primo single-deckers were acquired for the routes, and all were later named after bears to highlight charity work to end bile farming.

In January 2009, the company won a council contract to operate routes 392 and 393, which were rebranded as "The Shuttle" in recognition of the area's silk mills, a shuttle being used in the manufacturing process. This was followed in April 2009 by the takeover of former Stagecoach Manchester service 191, which was renumbered 391 and became part of "The Shuttle" family of services, although the direct service between Poynton and Manchester provided by route 191 was withdrawn. Further expansion followed in July 2009 with the award of the 372 Bramhall Circular contract by Transport for Greater Manchester, this passed to Stagecoach Manchester in March 2011. In March 2011 Bakerbus commenced operating route 11 between Macclesfield and Kerridge, applying "The Shuttle" branding to this route.

In October 2009. the company took over "The Harrier" route between Crewe and Sandbach from Harrier Travel, and purchased another Plaxton Primo to operate it with. At the same time it launched its commercial service X38 between Biddulph and Crewe, and gained contracted route 32 in Crewe.

In August 2013, eight of the company's services ceased operating. In the same month Bakers was bought by Barbados-based company Island Fortitude Incorporated. In December 2014, the route operation was sold with nine buses to D&G Bus. No services are now operated by Bakerbus.

The surviving Bakers Coaches operation closed down in October 2015, and its remains were acquired by Hino Travel of Nottingham in December 2015. The reformed Bakers Travel continued to operate for a further two years, but was itself wound up in February 2018.

== Fleet ==
BakerBus and Bakers Coaches operated a combined fleet of 70 vehicles. Fleet livery was blue and yellow for BakerBus and green and white for Bakers Coaches.

BakerBus' fleet was originally dominated by Mercedes-Benz minibuses, with the first full-size vehicle, a Volvo B10B, arriving in 1993. Recent deliveries for BakerBus were five Alexander Dennis Enviro 200 and five Plaxton Primo single-deckers. Other types operated included Mercedes-Benz Vario minibuses, Volvo B6LEs, DAF SB120s and Optare Solos. In December 2008, following a partnership with Cheshire County Council, BakerBus became one of the first operators to introduce ticket machines with Smartcard readers for the pensioner's free travel scheme.

Bakers Coaches operated a small fleet of people carriers and coaches.
