= D&G Bus =

English bus operator

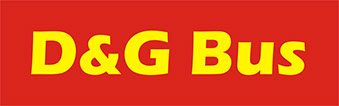

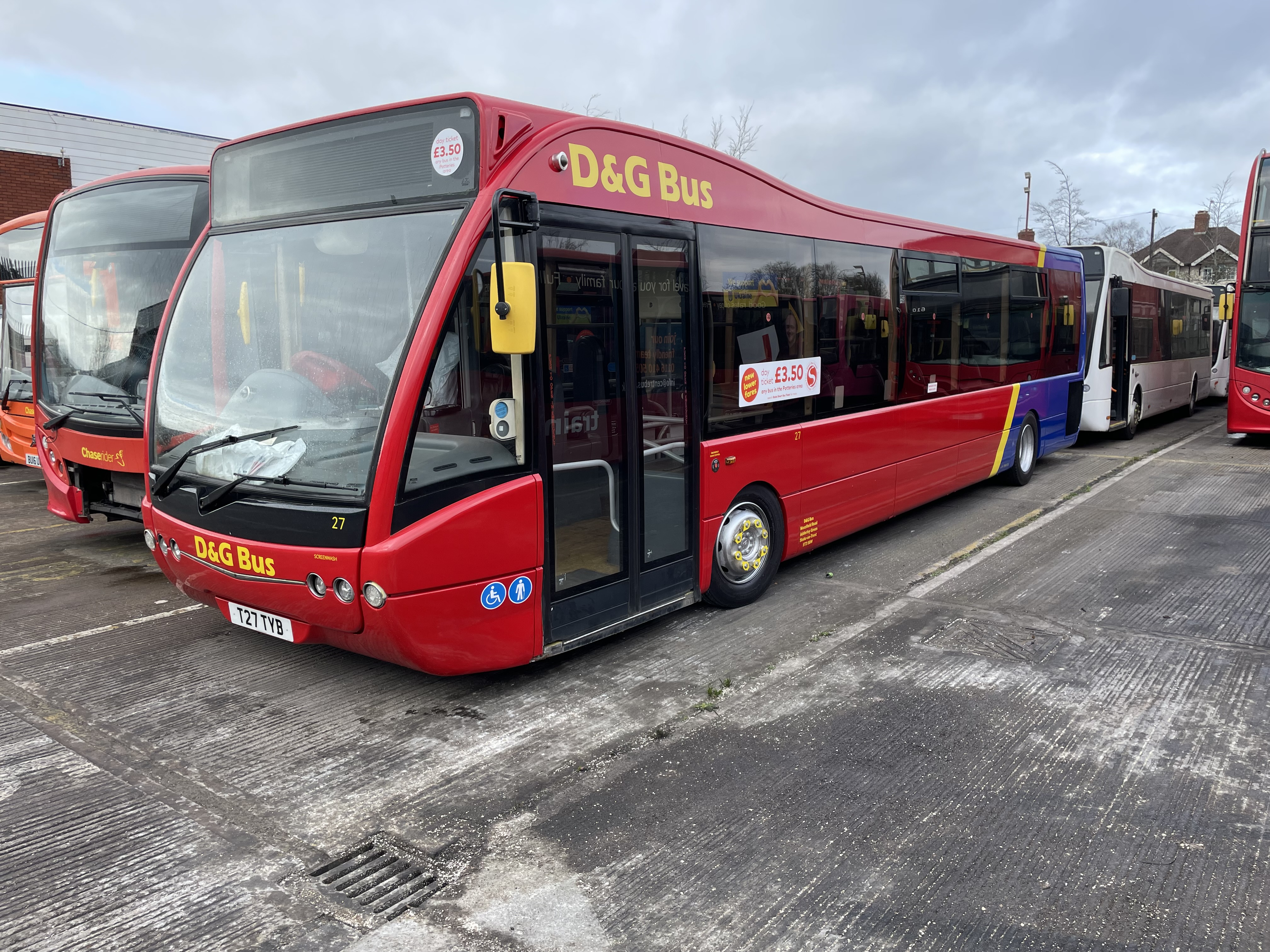
- D&G Bus Optare Versa (27), seen in the new corporate livery for D&G Bus and Chaserider parked at the Chaserider depot, in Cannock, Staffordshire, 23 March 2024.
- Parent: Centrebus Group
- Founded: 1998 (28 years ago)
- Headquarters: Longton, Stoke-on-Trent
- Service area: Cheshire; Greater Manchester; Shropshire; Staffordshire; Stoke-on-Trent
- Routes: 78
- Hubs: Congleton; Crewe; Knutsford; Hanley; Longton; Macclesfield; Newcastle-under-Lyme; Nantwich; Northwich
- Depots: 4
- Fleet: 131 (April 2026)
- Chief executive: Julian Peddle
- Website: www.dgbus.co.uk

D&G Bus is a bus operator based in Stoke-on-Trent, England. It operates local and interurban bus services in Cheshire, Greater Manchester, Shropshire, Staffordshire and Stoke-on-Trent.

== History ==
D&G Bus was formed by David Reeves and Gerald Henderson in April 1998, initially operating four buses on two routes under contract to Stoke-on-Trent City Council. It expanded with both route and school services in Cheshire and Staffordshire with 16 buses by the end of 1998.

In April 2005, D&G Bus purchased Wednesfield based Midland. In 2006 following Gerald Henderson's sudden death Julian Peddle purchased Henderson's shareholding in the business.

In August 2011, the Staffordshire business was sold to Wardle Transport with 46 routes and 30 buses. The Adderley Green depot was leased to Arriva but remained owned by David Reeves. In September 2011 D&G Bus and Julian Peddle purchased South Lancs Travel in Atherton, Greater Manchester.

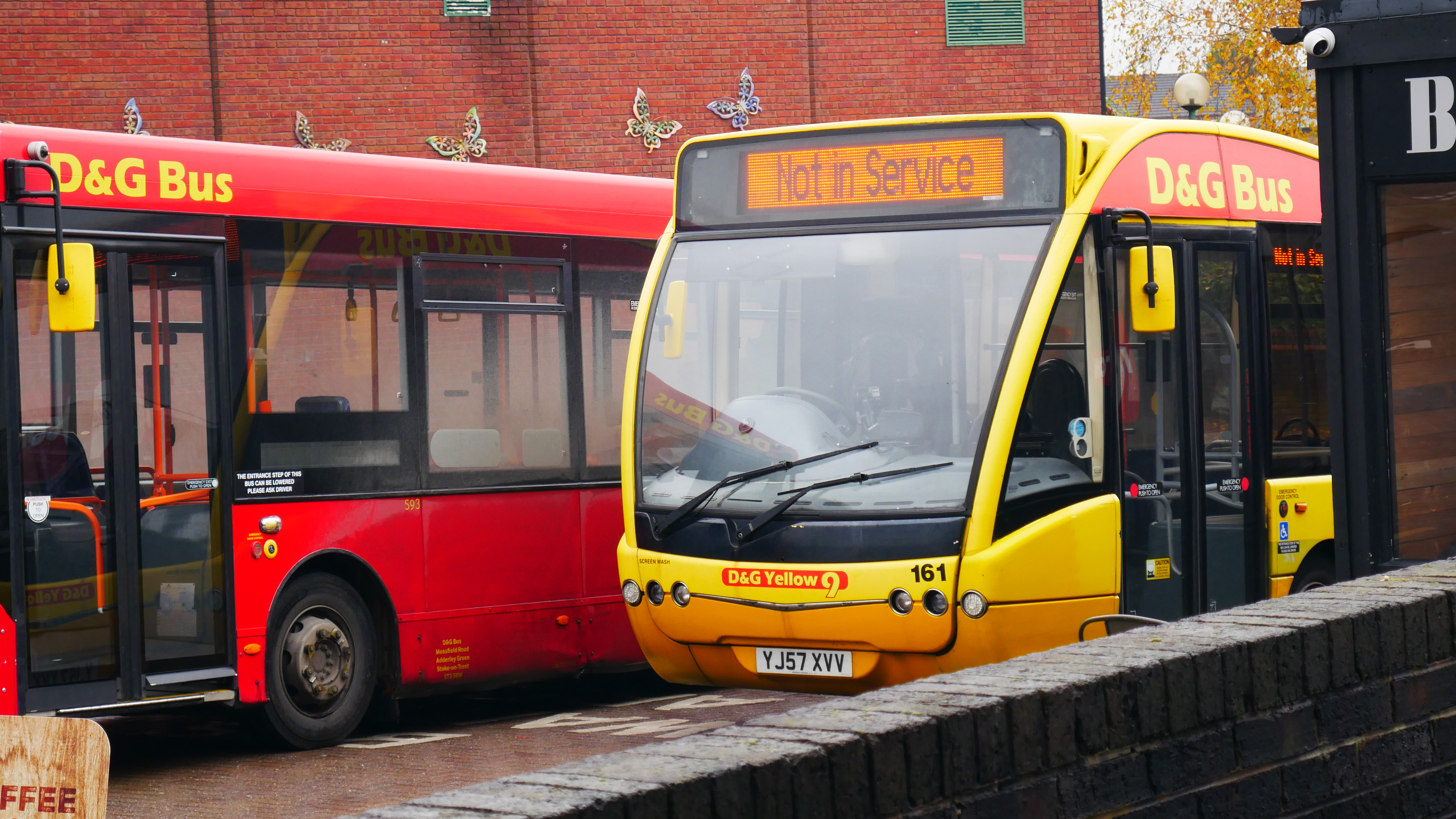
D&G Bus Optare Versa & Enviro 200 parked up at Congleton Bus Station

In August 2012, the Midland business was sold to Arriva Midlands with 61 buses. In December 2014, the route operations of BakerBus were purchased with nine buses.

In March 2015, D&G sold South Lancs Travel to Rotala and in May 2015 purchased Wardle Transport back from Arriva Midlands with 19 buses. In April 2016, D&G took over six routes from Routemaster Buses.

In September 2016, D&G Bus took over the rest of the routes which Routemaster Buses had operated. In October 2016 D&G were awarded new five-year contracts for eight Cheshire East routes which were operated by GHA Coaches prior to its collapse including the 88 Altrincham to Knutsford via Wilmslow service. However, most of these contracts were annulled 18 months later as part of Cheshire East council's bus review.

In December 2019, Julian Peddle's Centrebus Group purchased David Reeves shareholding in D&G bus, at present it will continue to operate as a separate unit from Centrebus.

In March 2020, David Reeves died after suffering a heart attack, aged 61.

In February 2023, Arriva North West announced that they were closing their depots in Winsford & Macclesfield. In response to this, D&G registered replacement routes to cover some of the cancelled services, with some of these services being part-supported by Cheshire East Council.

Following the closure of Arriva North West, Centrebus Group stepped in by supplying several buses for the fleet in Crewe. These were used on a wide variety of routes including the 38 and 37, routes that Arriva had previously covered. They have since begun returning to Centrebus as D&G Bus acquires more vehicles for the fleet.

In late 2024, D&G Bus bought 16 MCV Evoras for their Adderley Green and Crewe depots. The 4 MCV Evoras at Crewe are now used on the 38s and the Enviro 200 MMCs that were originally used on the 38 are now mainly used on the 31/37 routes. Of the 12 Evoras at Adderley Green, 5 are branded orange for Route 1 and 6 are branded yellow for Route 9 with one in general corporate livery as a spare.

== Depots ==
The company has depots in:

- Adderley Green - Mossfield Road
- Cannock - Delta Way (Chaserider)
- Crewe - Cowley Way
- Macclesfield - Gaw End Lane
- Shrewsbury - (Hotspur)

Past depots, now closed have included:

- Crewe - Lockitt Street
- Leek - Sunnyhills Road (shared with Aimee's Travel)
- Northwich - Chapel Street, Wincham
- Uttoxeter - The Wellington Pub (Old Headquarters)

== Fleet ==
As of January 2025, the fleet consisted of 126 buses. Fleet livery was originally cream and blue, it has since been replaced by a red with yellow signwriting scheme. During January 2024, the company revealed a new fleet livery. Red is the main colour dominating the majority of the vehicle, but now features a yellow diagonal stripe with the rear of the vehicle being dark blue. This scheme is similar to the newer livery of Centrebus vehicles.

As of July 2026, 64 buses in D&G’s fleet adorn the new livery.

The fleet mainly consists of Optare Versas, Enviro 200's & Enviro 200 MMCs.

Since December 2023, D&G acquired a number of brand new and second-hand Enviro 200 MMCs, both the short and long wheel-base varieties.

As of August 2024, the firm acquired a number of brand new MCV eVoRa bodied Volvo B8RLEs, six of which feature ‘the nines’ livery. Since then, more Evoras have arrived in a new brand for ‘the orange one’.

The company are continuing to invest in vehicles for the fleet, mainly beginning to standardise with Alexander Dennis Enviro200 MMCs and Optare Solo SRs.

== Chaserider ==
In November 2020, D&G announced they would be taking over the Cannock depot of Arriva Midlands from January 2021 with operations in Cannock and Stafford running under the Chaserider brand.

Chaserider operates as a subsidiary of D&G with different ticketing arrangements and operates a separate website, similar to the way Arriva owned Yorkshire Tiger operated in West Yorkshire but unlike Yorkshire Tiger, Chaserider has a similar livery to its parent.

== Hotspur ==
On 1st September 2026, D&G launched the brand Hotspur to operate some local bus services (currently six) in the Shrewsbury area including to Montgomery, Powys and Stoke-on-Trent.

Hotspur is a revival of a brand name used by Midland Red during the 1980s and is based at a new depot facility within Shrewsbury. On 14 October 2026, Shropshire Council awarded Hotspur the contract to operate the Shrewsbury Park-and-ride services from 1 November 2026 for three years.
