= Arriva Midlands =

British bus operator

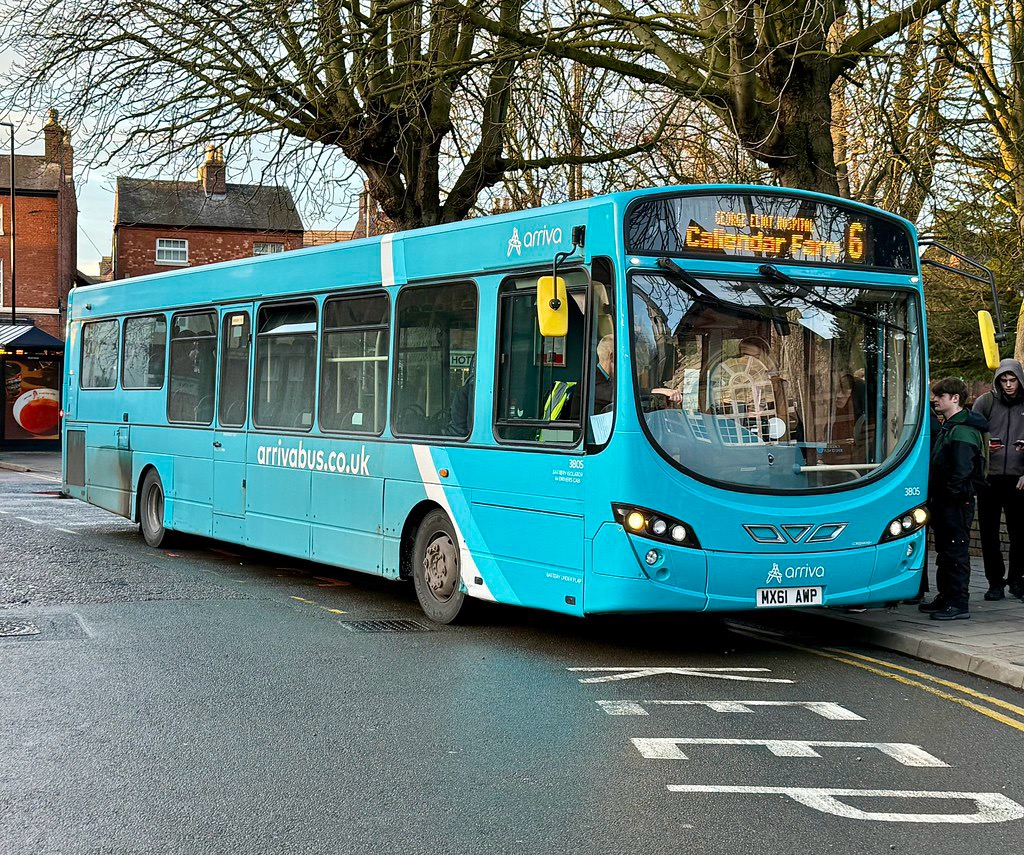
- An Arriva Midlands VDL Pulsar, pictured in Tamworth, Staffordshire, February 2026.
- Parent: Arriva UK Bus
- Founded: 1904; 122 years ago
- Headquarters: 4 Westmoreland Avenue, Thurmaston, Leicestershire, United Kingdom
- Service area: East Midlands; West Midlands; Bedfordshire; Buckinghamshire
- Service type: Bus services
- Depots: 10
- Chief executive: Mike Cooper
- Website: www.arrivabus.co.uk/Midlands

Arriva Midlands is a bus operator providing services in the East Midlands and West Midlands areas of England. It is a subsidiary of Arriva UK Bus.

== Arriva Midlands North Operations ==
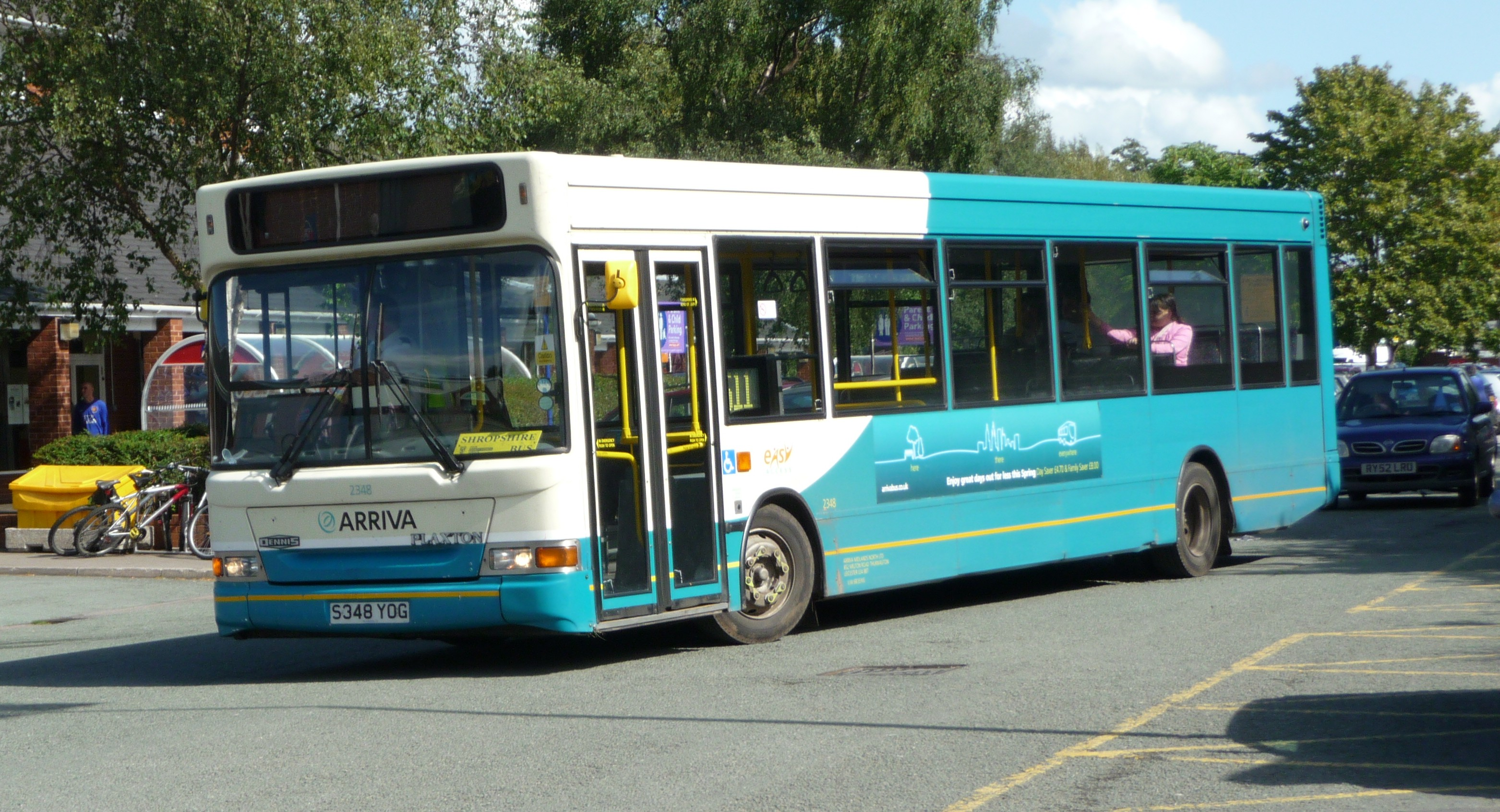
Plaxton Pointer 2 bodied Dennis Dart in Whitchurch in August 2009

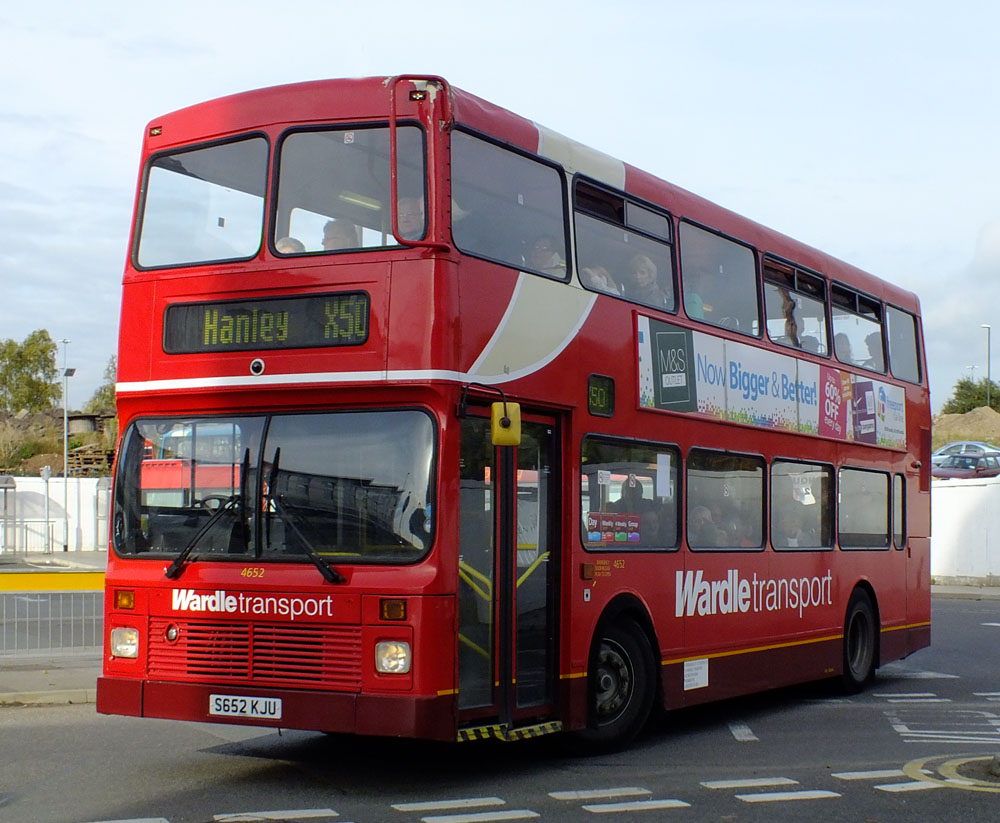
Wardle Transport Northern Counties Palatine bodied Volvo Olympian in October 2012

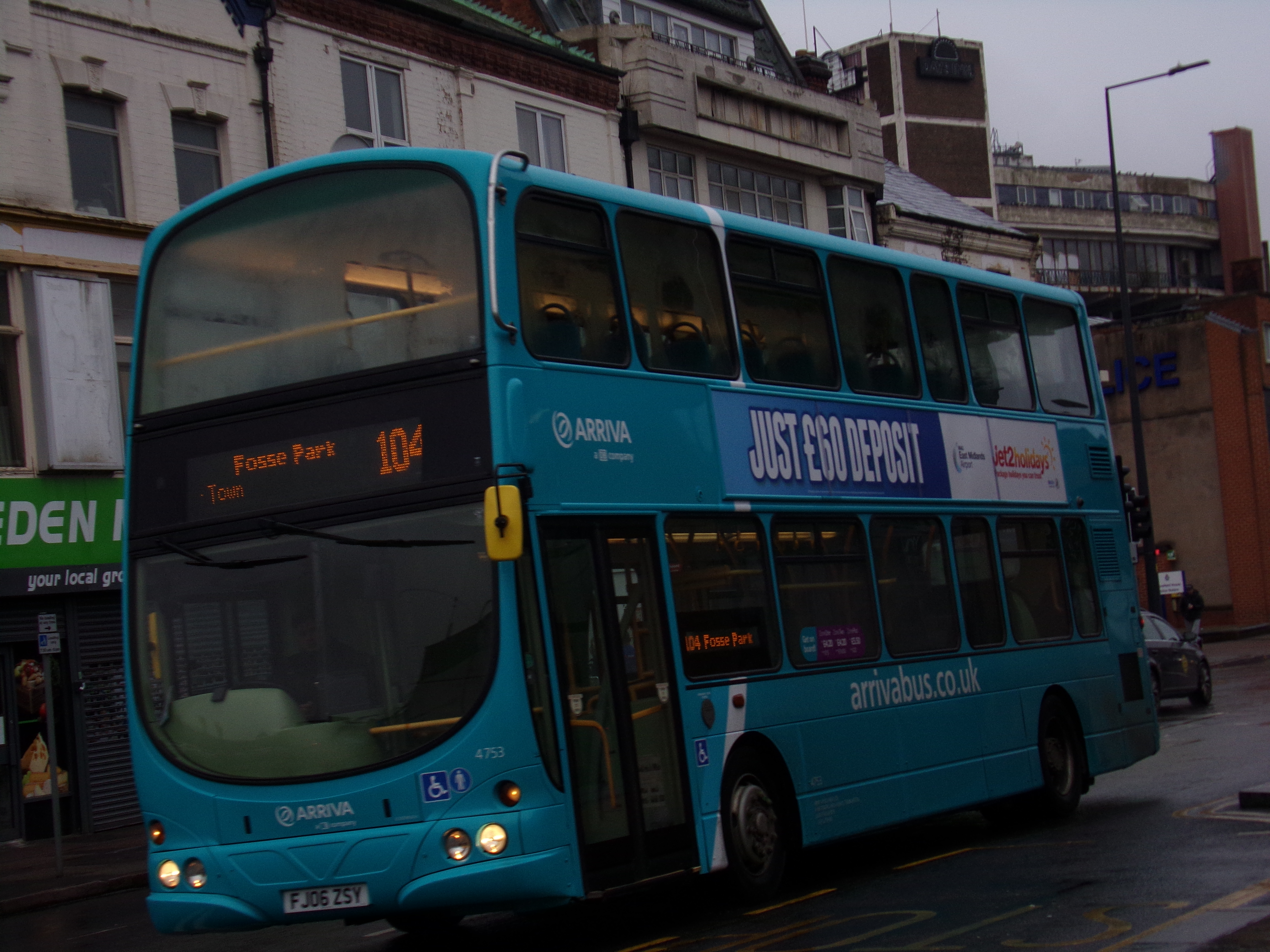
A Wright Gemini-bodied VDL DB250 pictured on route 104 to Fosse Park.

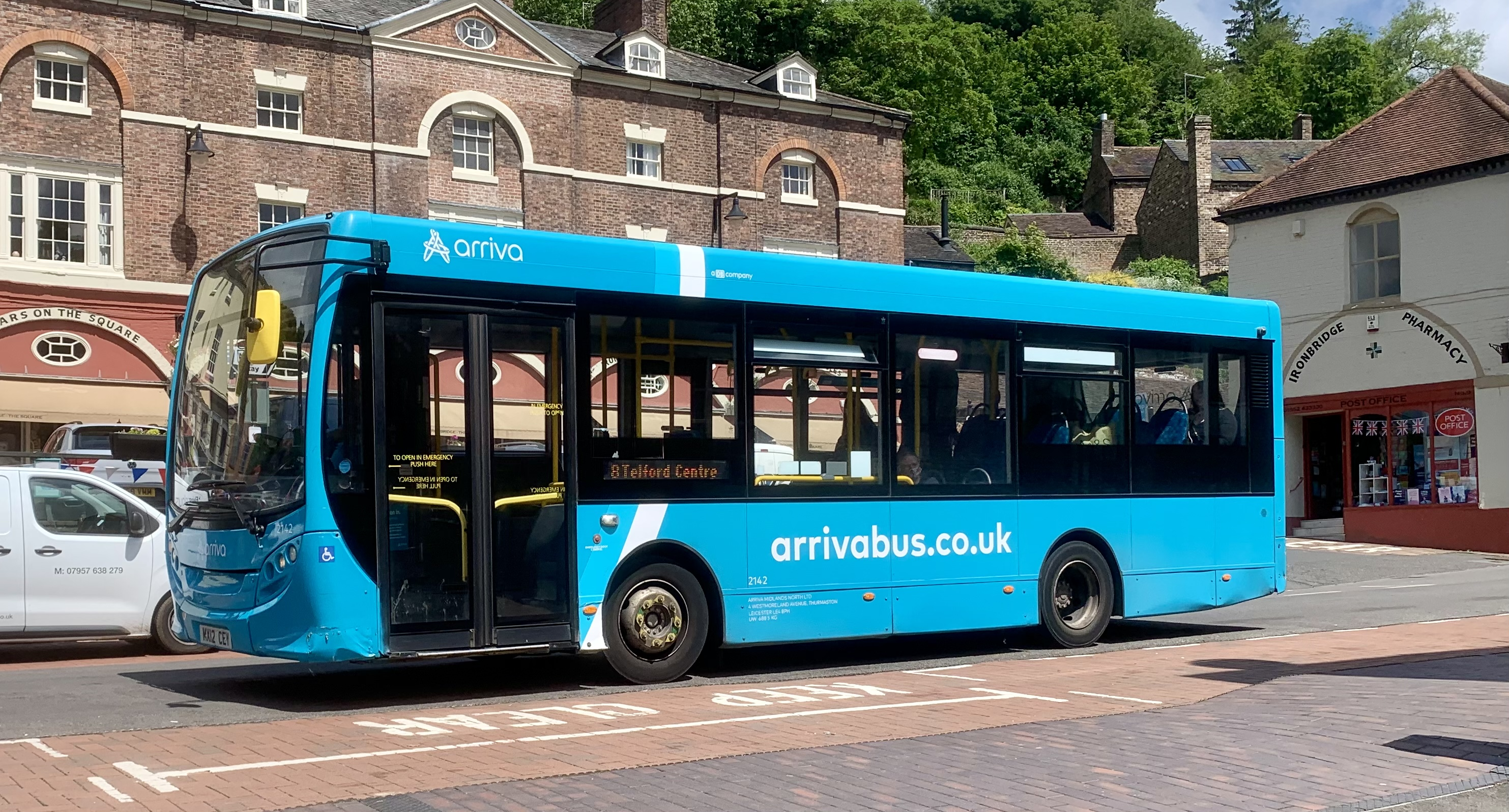
An Arriva Midlands Enviro200 in the new corporate livery in Ironbridge, Shropshire, June 2022.

In September 1981, Midland Red North was formed with 230 buses operating from six depots in Shropshire, Staffordshire and the West Midlands as part of the breakup of the Midland Red bus company. In May 1983, the Ludlow depot was closed. In January 1988 Midland Red North was sold to the Drawlane Transport Group. In November 1992, it was sold to British Bus, which was sold to the Cowie Group in August 1996.

In 2003, the Arriva Midlands North garages in Crewe, Macclesfield and Winsford were transferred to Arriva North West. These had previously been operated by Crosville and had adopted the "Midland Redline" fleet name after transfer to Midland Red North. The remaining parts of Arriva Midlands North were combined with Arriva Derby and Arriva Fox County to form Arriva Midlands. Buses still operated under the Arriva Midlands North legal name (except Burton upon Trent, which used Stevensons of Uttoxeter).

In February 2007, the business of Chase Coaches was purchased, including 27 buses, with operations integrated into Arriva's Cannock depot. In late 2007, a new ChaseLinx brand (similar to the Leicester Linx brand) was introduced, reflecting the purchase of Chase Coaches.

In December 2007, Swadlincote depot closed with operations transferred to Burton upon Trent. In August 2008, the Hinckley depot and services were sold to Centebus Holdings. In January 2009, the Shifnal depot closed while in the same month Bridgnorth reopened.

In December 2010, the business of Wardle Transport, Stoke-on-Trent was purchased with 64 buses, followed in June 2011 by the Staffordshire operations of D&G Bus with 30 buses that was integrated with Wardle Transport and in August 2012 Midland of Wednesfield from D&G Bus with 61 buses.

In May 2015, D&G Bus purchased Wardle Transport back from Arriva Midlands with 19 buses.

On 23 April 2017, the Wednesfield depot closed, with some services passing to Diamond Buses with nine vehicles and the remainder reallocated to other depots. The depot had only reopened in March 2013 after a refurbishment.

In 2017, four Arriva Shires & Essex depots (Milton Keynes, Luton, Aylesbury and High Wycombe), and their routes, were transferred to Arriva Midlands. The vehicles were renumbered in late 2018 and early 2019 to avoid multiple vehicles having the same fleet numbers.

Arriva announced on 1 April 2018 that no buses from its Cannock depot would run in the evenings and on Sundays as a result of Staffordshire County Council funding cuts. Hundreds signed an online petition within the first week, which quickly grew to thousands, with support from two local MPs.

In November 2020, it was announced that the Cannock Depot would be sold to D&G Bus, with services operating under the Chaserider brand from the end of service on 9 January 2021.

== Arriva Midlands East operations ==
=== Derby ===
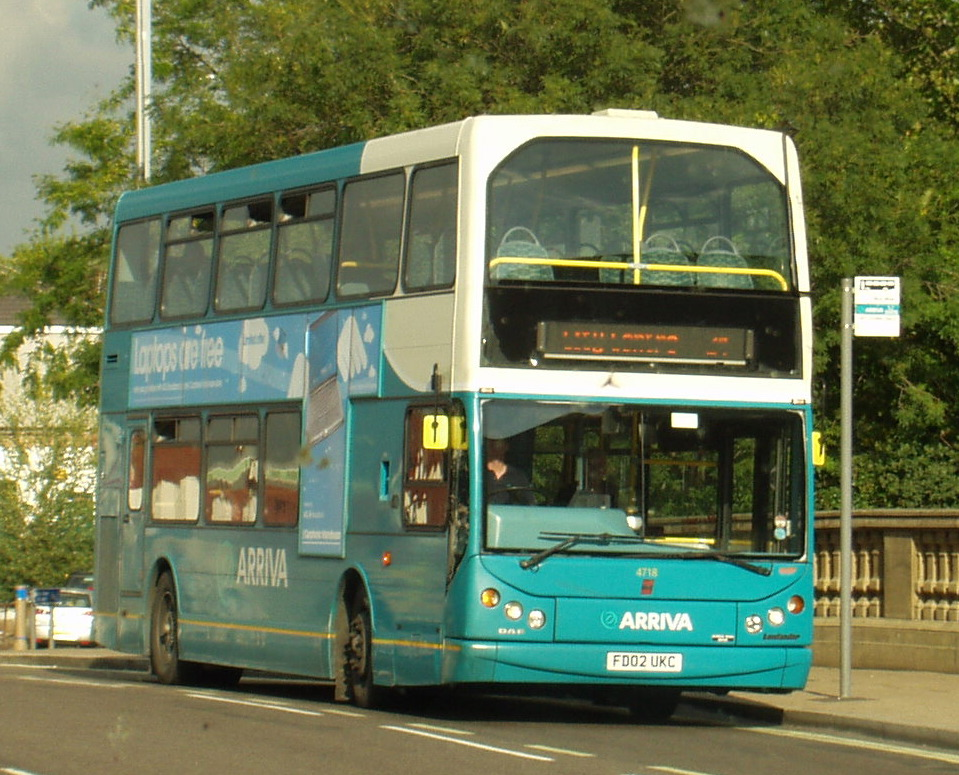
Arriva Derby East Lancs Myllennium Lowlander bodied VDL DB250 in Derby in September 2007

In 1994, Derby City Transport was privatised and sold to British Bus. In August 1996, British Bus was purchased by the Cowie Group, and the operation rebranded as Arriva Derby.

Arriva previously had a depot in Burton upon Trent until August 2016, when the operations passed to Midland Classic.

=== Leicestershire & Warwickshire ===
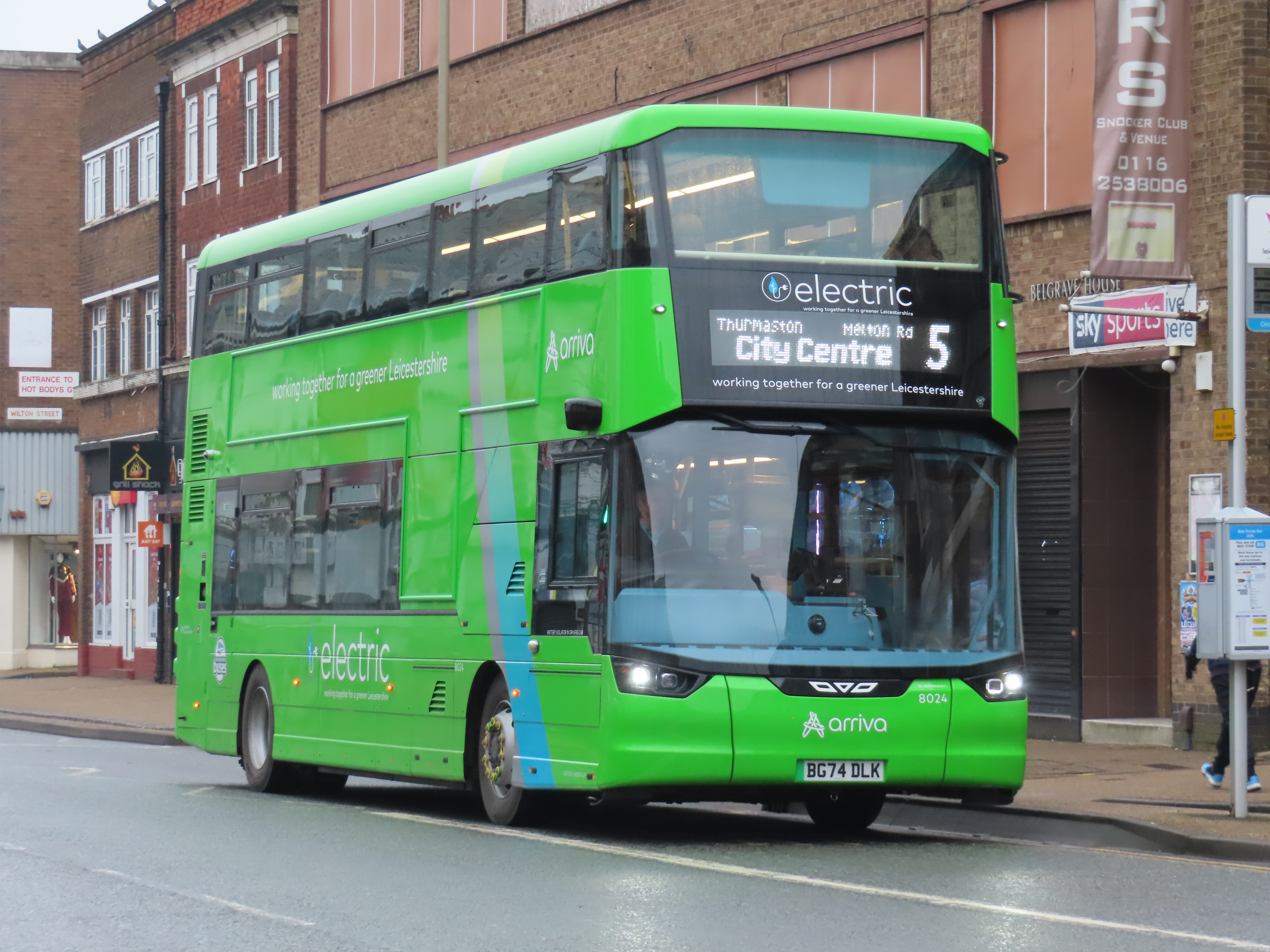
Arriva Midlands East Wright StreetDeck Electroliner in Leicester in February 2025

In September 1981, Midland Red East was formed with 181 buses operating from five depots in Derbyshire, Leicestershire, Lincolnshire and Nottinghamshire as part of the breakup of the Midland Red bus company, and in January 1984 was renamed Midland Fox. In 1987, it was privatised in a management buyout. Several smaller operators, including Loughborough Bus & Coach Company, were purchased, and in 1989 it was sold to the Drawlane Group. In November 1992, it was sold to British Bus, which in August 1996 was sold to the Cowie Group and later renamed Arriva Fox County.

Arriva Midlands East currently operates from three depots in the Leicestershire area: Thurmaston, Coalville, and Barwell.

In September 2013, Arriva purchased Centrebus Group's shares in Centrebus Holdings, and its Hinckley operations became Hinckley Bus, which operated as part of Arriva Midlands. During late 2018, the Hinckley Bus operations were merged into the main Arriva Midlands business.

Arriva announced in August 2021 that it would close the South Wigston depot after 64 years, with most services moving to Thurmaston depot in October 2021. National Express Transport Solutions has since taken over the site, relocating from its base on nearby Gloucester Crescent.

== Depots ==
=== Current Depots ===
Arriva Midlands operate eleven depots as of January 2022 in:

- Derby
- Shrewsbury
- Tamworth
- Telford
- Thurmaston, also the HQ for Arriva Midlands
- Barwell
- Milton Keynes
- Luton
- Aylesbury
- High Wycombe

In 2017, four Arriva Shires & Essex depots (Milton Keynes, Luton, Aylesbury and High Wycombe), and their routes, were transferred to Arriva Midlands. The vehicles were renumbered in late 2018 and early 2019 to avoid multiple Arriva Midlands vehicles sharing the same fleet numbers.

In 2018, the Cannock depot began closing entirely on Sundays due to county council subsidy cuts, leaving Cannock without buses; the depot was sold to D&G Bus in January 2021.

In 2023, Arriva announced plans to close the Oswestry depot due to low patronage and financial difficulties following the Covid-19 pandemic. Most services operated from Oswestry would be moved to Shrewsbury and Arriva Buses Wales' Wrexham depot if the planned closure is approved. The closure went ahead in early summer 2023.

=== Former Depots ===
- Cannock - purchased by D&G Bus in November 2020, and was transferred on 9 January 2021.
- Burton-upon-Trent - purchased by Midland Classic in 2016
- Wednesfield - closed in 2017 after losing most Transport for West Midlands contracted services: nine vehicles and remaining tendered routes sold to Diamond Bus. Commercially run routes 35 and 35A were moved to Cannock Depot, while routes 10, 10A, and 10B were transferred to Telford Depot. Service 10 has since been withdrawn by Arriva (after a spell being operated by Cannock depot), with the 10A & 10B now operated by National Express.
- Bridgnorth depot, an outstation of Telford, operated services 585-588 in South Staffordshire along with services 9, 297, 101 and 436. The depot closed when the 585-588 routes ended in 2012, with services operated by Shrewsbury (436) and Telford (other routes). It was located on the Stanmore Industrial Estate.
- Wellington - replaced by a new depot in Telford.
- Southgates - Former Midland Fox garage closed in 2009, and operations were merged with the Thurmaston Depot.
- Wigston - Closed 31 October 2021
- Oswestry - Operated by Arriva since the early 2000s after moving from the previous Midland Red depot. Operated services 2/2A/2C, 53, 54, 405, 449, 79A, 71, X5 before the decision to close the depot in early 2023. Services 53 and X5 were transferred to Shrewsbury, whereas services 2/2A/2C were transferred to Arriva Wales Wrexham; all remaining routes were reallocated to other operators.
