= Stevensons of Uttoxeter =

Bus operator in Staffordshire, England

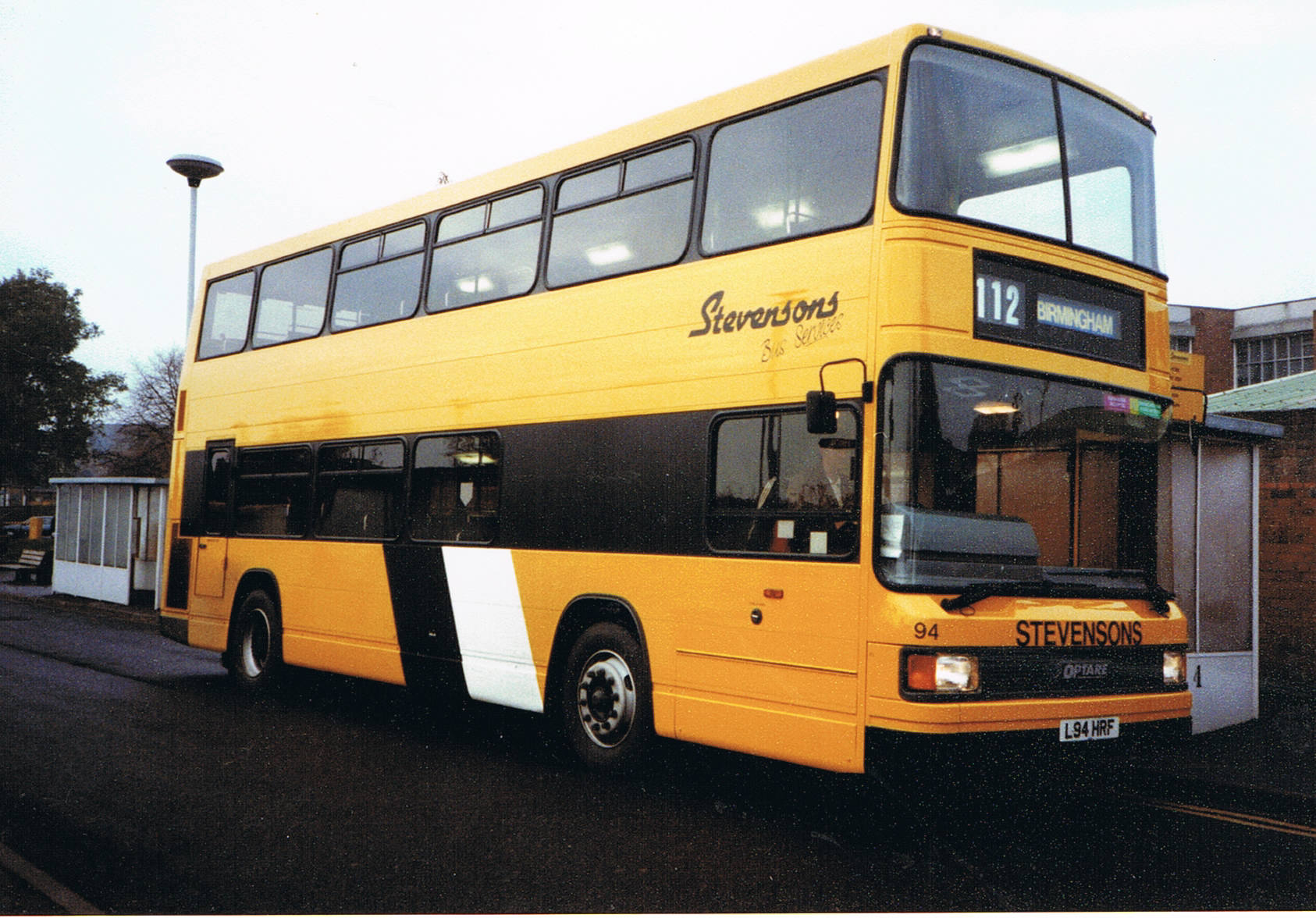
- Stevensons Optare Spectra at Lichfield bus station
- Parent: George Stevenson; Julian Peddle
- Founded: 11 September 1926; 99 years ago
- Ceased operation: 1997
- Headquarters: Staffordshire
- Service area: East Midlands; West Midlands
- Service type: Bus and coach
- Depots: 5
- Fleet: 260 (May 1994)

Stevensons of Uttoxeter was a bus company that operated in Staffordshire from 1926 to 1997.

== History ==
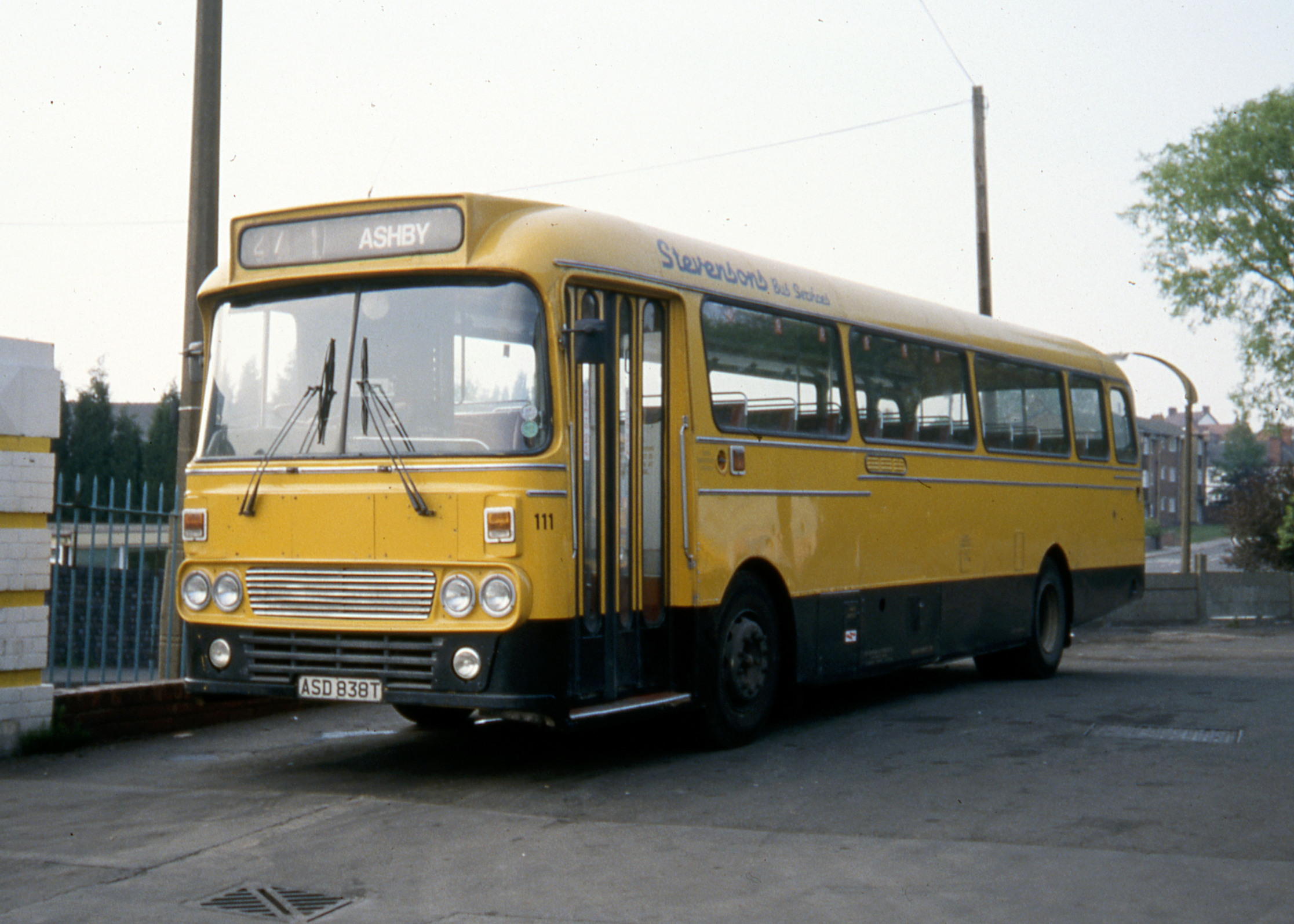
Alexander Y Type bodied Seddon Pennine at the company's Swadlincote depot in 1990

On 11 September 1926, John Stevenson commenced operating a bus service from Uttoxeter to Burton upon Trent based out of premises at Spath just north of Uttoxeter. In 1971, the business passed to John's son George, who was shortly joined by his son David. By 1977, the fleet consisted of 40 buses and coaches, 16 of which were double-decker buses.

In the early 1980s, a small garage was opened in Rugeley, in conjunction with the Stevensons taking over local services in the town formerly operated by fellow independent Middletons, as well as by National Bus Company (NBC) operator Midland Red. In 1983, George Stevenson sold his 50% share of the business to bus industry entrepreneur Julian Peddle. On 1 October 1985, Stevensons merged its bus operations with those operated by East Staffordshire District Council, with Stevenson and Peddle owning 51% and the council 49%.

In August 1987, Midland Fox, the eastern division of the split Midland Red company, was sold by the NBC in a management buyout. Stevensons additionally took a minority shareholding of Midland Fox and acquired the 40-vehicle Swadlincote depot of Midland Fox. In February 1992, Stevensons became one of the shareholders of the newly-formed Rhondda Buses, running services from former National Welsh depots in Caerphilly and Porth. Stevensons' shareholdings were later sold to Stagecoach Holdings in November 1993, with operations there today forming part of Stagecoach South Wales.

Also in the early 1990s, Stevensons began operating substantial services in the West Midlands, mostly under contract to Centro. Around 100 vehicles were used by Stevensons for these operations, based from freehold sites in Willenhall, West Bromwich and Smethwick, and a separate coaching business named Sealandair was acquired. In August 1994, however, Stevensons pulled out of the West Midlands operating market in order to cut financial losses incurred from running the services, selling or tendering routes to competitor West Midlands Travel and disposing of the Sealandair operation to the Birmingham Coach Company. This left service 112, serving Burton upon Trent and Birmingham, as Stevensons' only service operating in the West Midlands.

In June 1994, Stevensons of Uttoxeter, by then operating a fleet of 260 buses from five depots in Burslem, Burton upon Trent, Rugeley, Spath and Swadlincote, was purchased by British Bus. The company was amalgamated as part of Midland Red North, with buses adopting Midland Red's red and yellow livery with Stevensons fleetnames retained. Stevensons' Rugeley garage was closed by Midland Red North in 1995, and with the merger of British Bus and the Cowie Group from the end of 1997, the Stevensons name began to phased out in favour of Arriva Midlands.

Stevensons' original Spath depot was closed by Arriva Midlands in 2000, with the site acquired by the independent Dunn-Line of Nottingham; in 2003, this operation, rebranded Dunn-Line Uttoxeter, was sold to Solus Coaches of Tamworth. Arriva then closed Swadlincote garage in 2007, then later sold Burton upon Trent garage to independent Midland Classic in 2016.
