= Adderley Green =

Village in Staffordshire, England

Coordinates: 52.99°N 02.13°W

- Location within Staffordshire
- OS grid reference: SJ9144
- Shire county: Staffordshire
- Region: West Midlands
- Country: England
- Sovereign state: United Kingdom
- Police: Staffordshire
- Fire: Staffordshire
- Ambulance: West Midlands

Adderley Green is a village in Staffordshire, England. It is included in the town of Longton with the population at the 2011 census being listed under the Stoke Ward of Sandford Hill. It was a centre for mining activities in the 19th century.

In 2010, the Adderley Green Residents Association began an annual Summer Festival. The Festival is in July each year and includes live music, football matches and stalls.

== Bus depots ==
D&G Bus and First Potteries have their bus depots in Adderley Green.
