= National Welsh Omnibus Services =

Bus operator in South East Wales and Gloucestershire

National Welsh Cymru Cenedlaethol (Welsh)

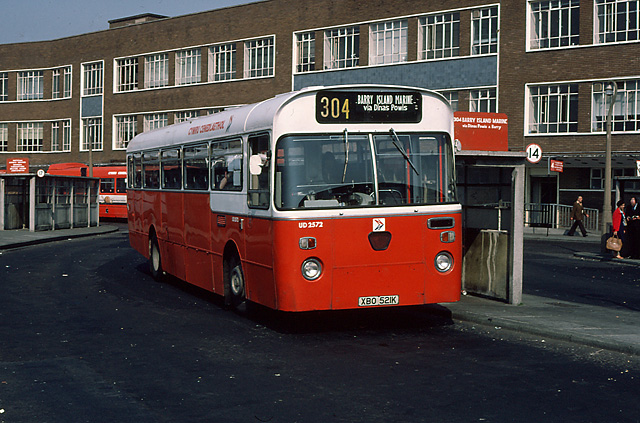
- Marshall bodied Leyland Leopard at Cardiff Central bus station in 1980
- Parent: National Bus Company
- Founded: 17 April 1978; 48 years ago
- Defunct: 7 August 1992; 34 years ago
- Headquarters: Cardiff, Wales
- Locale: South East Wales; Forest of Dean
- Service area: Cardiff; Monmouthshire; Gwent; Gloucestershire; Newport; Rhondda Cynon Taf; Vale of Glamorgan
- Service type: Bus and coach
- Fleet: 410 (May 1987)

National Welsh Omnibus Services (Welsh: Cymru Cenedlaethol) was a bus company which operated in South East Wales and in the Forest of Dean area of Gloucestershire from 1978 to 1992.

== History ==
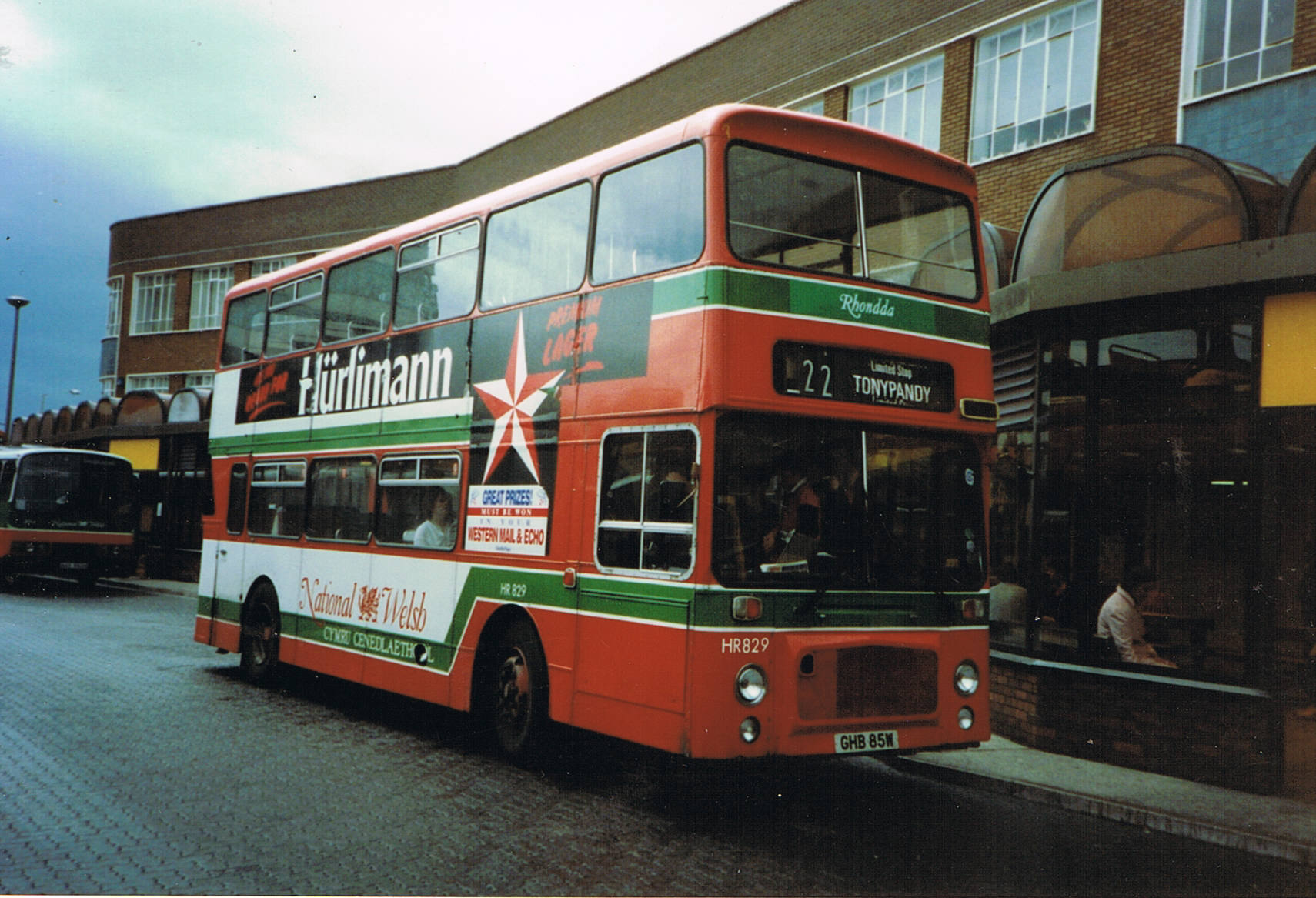
East Lancashire bodied Bristol VRT in post-deregulation livery at Cardiff Central bus station

National Welsh had its origins in the Western Welsh Omnibus Company, formed in 1929 as a subsidiary of British Electric Traction. The Great Western Railway transferred its bus services in South and West Wales to the company and took a financial interest, hence the name. The railway interest passed to the British Transport Commission in 1948, but Western Welsh was not fully nationalised until 1967 when BET sold its bus interests to the Transport Holding Company. The company passed to the National Bus Company in January 1969.

Between 1970 and 1972, the NBC transferred Western Welsh's operations west of Bridgend to its subsidiaries South Wales Transport and Crosville Motor Services. In return, Western Welsh took over the operations of Rhondda Transport.

On 27 April 1978, the National Bus Company transferred the operations of its subsidiary Red & White Services to Western Welsh and, following a competition held a year prior to suggest new names for the merged company, renamed it to National Welsh. The company's area of operations thus became South East Wales and the Forest of Dean area of Gloucestershire.

Following deregulation and amid the breakup of the National Bus Company, in May 1987, National Welsh was sold to its management. Despite making a pre-tax profit of £341,000 (equivalent to £986,000 in 2025) during 1987, largely driven by the use of over 150 high-frequency 'Bustler' minibuses, the company struggled to make a profit thereafter, facing sustained competition in the Rhondda Valley from independent operators and district municipals Cynon Valley Transport, Inter Valley Link, owned by Rhymey Borough Council, and Taff-Ely Transport, and also finding itself in trouble with the Traffic Commissioner with allegations of poor vehicle maintenance and driving standards.

National Welsh purchased Taff-Ely Transport in August 1988, with Inter Valley Link - later found to be two weeks away from liquidation - following in March 1989; National Welsh entered into unsuccessful negotiations to purchase Cynon Valley Transport, and also attempted to buy Merthyr Tydfil Transport, attempting to provoke a bus war by hiring the municipal's drivers and running competing 'Bustler' services. Merthyr Tydfil Transport was sold in June 1989 to a group of three independent coach operators, however it collapsed into liquidation the following August.

=== Demise ===
By 1990, National Welsh was encountering serious financial difficulties and had begun consulting financial advisers 3i. The company sold depots and offices in Aberdare, Porth and Pontypridd, as well as its central workshops in Chepstow, resulting in the loss of over 700 jobs and a number of routes withdrawn or changing hands to competitors. Rumours that National Welsh was to be sold to Stagecoach Holdings were denied by managing director Brian Noton in October 1990, shortly before he was fired following month.

In January 1991, drivers accepted a survival package that included a 7.5% cut in wages, reduced holidays and a change in the rates of sick pay. As part of this package, these cuts were followed by the Eastern Division of National Welsh, which included depots in Cwmbran, Chepstow, Brynmawr and Crosskeys and outstations in Abergavenny, Brecon, Cinderford, Ross and Lydney, being sold to the Western Travel Group for £2 million (equivalent to £4,600,000 in 2025). Western Travel renamed this division Red & White Services Ltd.

Despite a buyout of the company being attempted by the remaining workforce, in January 1992, National Welsh, saddled with debts of £5 million (equivalent to £11,033,000 in 2025), was placed into administration. The collapse of National Welsh immediately sparked bus wars in their former operating area as subsequently, the company's depots were closed or sold:

- The routes of Bridgend, Caerphilly and Tredegar depots were already being operated by Red & White and South Wales Transport and were closed.
- The Aberdare and Merthyr depots were sold to Offademo, an off-the-shelf company owned by Cynon Valley Transport. These two depots were immediately closed and sold for property development.
- Porth depot, operating a fleet of 75 buses, was sold to a new company, Rhondda Buses. Rhondda Buses was created from a consortium of Stevensons of Uttoxeter, Julian Peddle, British Bus, Potteries Motor Traction and later Red & White's owners Western Travel.
- Barry depot held its own in the Vale of Glamorgan, despite fierce competition from Cardiff Bus, but with Cardiff Bus running commercial services against National Welsh's tendered services, South Glamorgan County Council was legally obliged to remove any subsidy to National Welsh. A new operator's licence was granted to Barry Line Bus Co Ltd, and an employee bid was launched for Barry depot. This was unsuccessful and the last remaining depot of National Welsh closed on 7 August 1992, eight months after the company first fell into administration. After a period used by Vale of Glamorgan Council as a storage unit, the depot reopened as a bus museum in 2008 on lease to the Cardiff Transport Preservation Group.

When managing director Brian Noton was sacked in November 1990 on the advice of National Welsh workers associated with the Transport and General Workers Union (TGWU), it was initially arranged by the TGWU that Noton would take a demotion and remain with the company, while company chairman Lyn Davies was also to be sacked in a bid to save the company. Following the boardroom coup that ousted him, Noton, who later took a job at London Regional Transport, sued National Welsh at the High Court of Justice for unfair dismissal and demanded reinstatement at an industrial tribunal, and won damages of £3,864 (equivalent to £8,526 in 2025) in January 1992 following a trial which National Welsh, by then in administration, did not attend.
