= Hebble Motor Services =

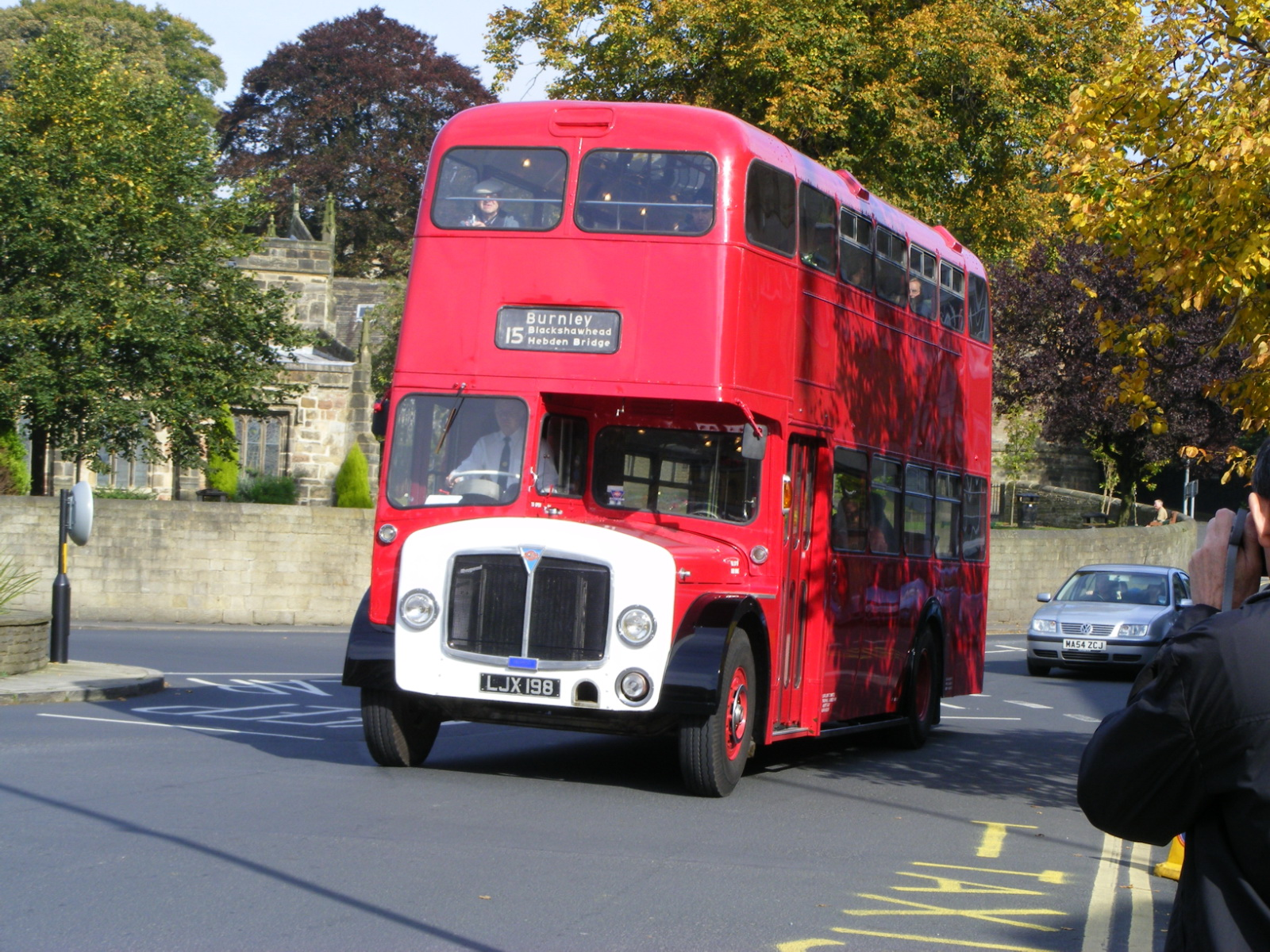
A restored Hebble bus

Hebble Motor Services was a bus and coach company based in Halifax, West Yorkshire, England, which operated between 1924 and 1973.

In 1924 Oliver and Charles Holdsworth began local bus services in and around Halifax under the Hebble name (named after the local River Hebble). The business expanded with services to neighbouring towns, and by 1929 it was operating 86 buses on 28 routes. It was then acquired by the LMS railway company. In 1932 British Electric Traction took a 50% interest. The company began operating coach services to Blackpool, and after the Second World War expanded its tours and excursion business.

In 1967 BET sold its bus interests to the nationalised Transport Holding Company, so in 1969 Hebble became part of the new National Bus Company. NBC embarked on a process of rationalising and restructuring of its services, and in 1970 some of Hebble's services were transferred to West Yorkshire Road Car. In 1971 Hebble's remaining bus services were transferred to other operators, and from then Hebble concentrated on its coach business. At the end of 1973 the coach services were transferred to National Travel (which became National Express in 1974), the new coach business formed by NBC. The Hebble name then fell out of use.
