= Transport Holding Company =

British state-owned transport company, 1962–1973

- Company type: Statutory corporation (Note: The Transport Holding Company was a "body corporate with perpetual succession" created by section 29 of the Transport Act 1962 (i.e. a statute).)
- Predecessor: British Transport Commission (Note: Section 31 of the Transport Act 1962 vested the securities (i.e. shares) belonging to the British Transport Commission specified in Part IV of Schedule 4 to that Act, and the property, rights, and liabilities belonging to or subsisting against the British Transport Commission specified in Schedule 5 to that Act in the Transport Holding Company on the "vesting date", which was defined as 1 January 1963 by paragraph 1 of the Transport Act 1962 (Vesting Date) Order 1962.)
- Founded: 1 September 1962; 62 years ago (Note: The Transport Holding Company was created by section 29 of the Transport Act 1962, which came into force on 1 September 1962 per paragraph 1 of The Transport Act 1962 (Commencement No. 1) Order 1962.)
- Defunct: 31 March 1973; 52 years ago
- Fate: Dissolved (Note: The Transport Holding Company was dissolved by the Transport Holding Company (Dissolution) Order 1973, a statutory instrument made by the Secretary of State for the Environment under both section 53(3) of the Transport Act 1968 (as amended by section 1(3) of the Transport Holding Company Act 1972) and under sections 1(6) and 2(6) of the Transport Holding Company Act 1972.)
- Successor: National Freight Corporation (Note: On 30 March 1973 (the day before the Transport Holding Company was dissolved), "all the property, rights and liabilities belonging to or subsisting against the Transport Holding Company" were transferred to the National Freight Corporation by paragraph 2(1) of The Transport Holding Company (Dissolution) Order 1973.)

The Transport Holding Company (THC) was a British Government–owned company created by the Transport Act 1962 to administer a range of state-owned transport, travel and engineering companies that were previously managed by the British Transport Commission (BTC). It came into existence on 1 September 1962, with certain assets of the BTC vested in it on 1 January 1963.

== Assets ==
The THC's assets were very varied, reflecting its role as the manager of those investments that did not fit elsewhere in the post-1962 structure of nationalised transport. There were essentially six areas of activity:

- bus companies, some part-owned with the British Electric Traction Group, later acquired by the THC,
- bus manufacturing companies (Bristol Commercial Vehicles and Eastern Coach Works)
- road haulage companies, e.g. British Road Services (BRS) and Pickfords
- shipping lines, e.g. the BTC's shares in Associated Humber Lines and the Atlantic Steam Navigation Company
- travel agents (Thomas Cook and Son, to which Lunn Poly was later added)
- miscellaneous (the BTC's shares in the Penarth Dock Engineering Company)

== Demise ==
With the coming into effect of the Transport Act 1968 on 1 January 1969, the THC's road transport and shipping interests passed to the National Bus Company, the National Freight Corporation and the Scottish Transport Group. Its remaining assets were privatised and the company dissolved in the early 1970s.

== Subsidiary companies ==
=== Bus companies – England and Wales ===
The following companies passed to the THC in 1963:

- Brighton Hove and District Omnibus Company
- Bristol Omnibus Company
- Crosville Motor Services
- Cumberland Motor Services
- Durham District Services
- Eastern Counties Omnibus Company
- Eastern National Omnibus Company
- Hants & Dorset Motor Services
- Lincolnshire Road Car
- Mansfield District Traction
- Midland General Omnibus Company
- Nottinghamshire and Derbyshire Traction
- Red & White Services
- Southern National Omnibus Company
- Southern Vectis
- South Midland
- Thames Valley Traction
- Tilling's Transport (THC) Limited (consisting of many operating subsidiaries and previously nationalised by sale to the British Transport Commission in 1948)
- United Automobile Services
- United Counties Omnibus
- United Welsh Services Limited
- West Yorkshire Road Car
- Western National Omnibus Company
- Wilts and Dorset Motor Services

The THC also had a shareholding in the following coach companies (the remaining shares were owned by British Electric Traction):

- Black and White Motorways
- Samuelson Transport
- A Timpson and Sons

In October 1967 the THC purchased one of the largest remaining independent bus operators:

- West Riding Automobile Company and its 50% subsidiary:
  - County Motors (Lepton) Limited

In March 1968, as the Transport Act 1968 was passing through parliament, British Electric Traction decided to sell its bus operations to the THC:

- Aldershot and District Traction
- Devon General Omnibus and Touring Company and its subsidiary:
  - Grey Cars of Torquay
- East Kent Road Car Company
- East Midland Motor Services
- East Yorkshire Motor Services
- Greenslade's Tours
- Hebble Motor Services
- Maidstone & District
- Mexborough and Swinton Traction
- Midland Red and its subsidiary:
  - Stratford Blue
- Neath and Cardiff Luxury Coaches
- North Western Road Car
- Northern General Transport and its subsidiaries:
  - Gateshead and District Omnibus Company
  - Sunderland District Omnibus Company
  - Tynemouth and District Transport
  - Tyneside Omnibus company
  - Wakefield's Motors Limited
- City of Oxford Motor Services
- Potteries Motor Traction
- Rhondda Transport Company
- Ribble Motor Services and its subsidiaries:
  - Standerwick
  - Scout
- Sheffield United Tours
- South Wales Transport
- Southdown Motor Services
- Trent Motor Traction
- Western Welsh Omnibus Company
- Thomas Bros (Port Talbot) Limited
- Yorkshire Traction
- Yorkshire Woollen District Transport

THC already had a minority shareholding in many of the BET companies through shares purchased by the mainline railway companies in 1929–1930, which had passed to the state on the nationalisation of British Railways. The acquisition of the BET companies led to the THC gaining 100% of Black and White, County Motors, Samuelson's and Timpson's

=== Bus companies – Scotland ===
The Scottish companies were known as the Scottish Bus Group:

- Central SMT
- Highland Omnibuses
- Scottish Omnibuses
- Walter Alexander and Sons (Fife) Limited
- Walter Alexander and Sons (Midland) Limited
- Walter Alexander and Sons (Northern) Limited
- Western SMT

== Chairmen ==
- Sir Philip Warter
- Sir Reginald Wilson
- Lewis Whyte
