= South Wales Transport =

20th-century British bus operator

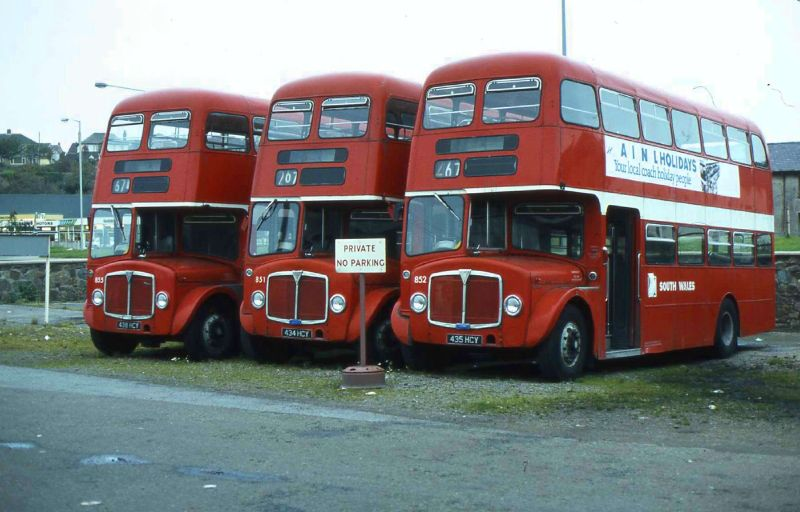
- Willowbrook bodied AEC Regent Vs in Haverfordwest October 1980
- Parent: National Bus Company
- Founded: 2 May 1914
- Ceased operation: 28 March 1999
- Headquarters: Swansea
- Service area: South Wales
- Service type: Bus operator

South Wales Transport was a company that operated buses, trams and trolleybuses in South Wales centred on Swansea and West Wales.

== History ==
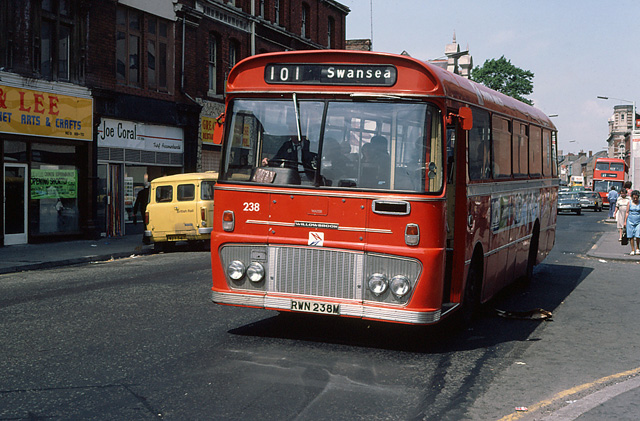
Willowbrook bodied Ford outside Swansea station in June 1980

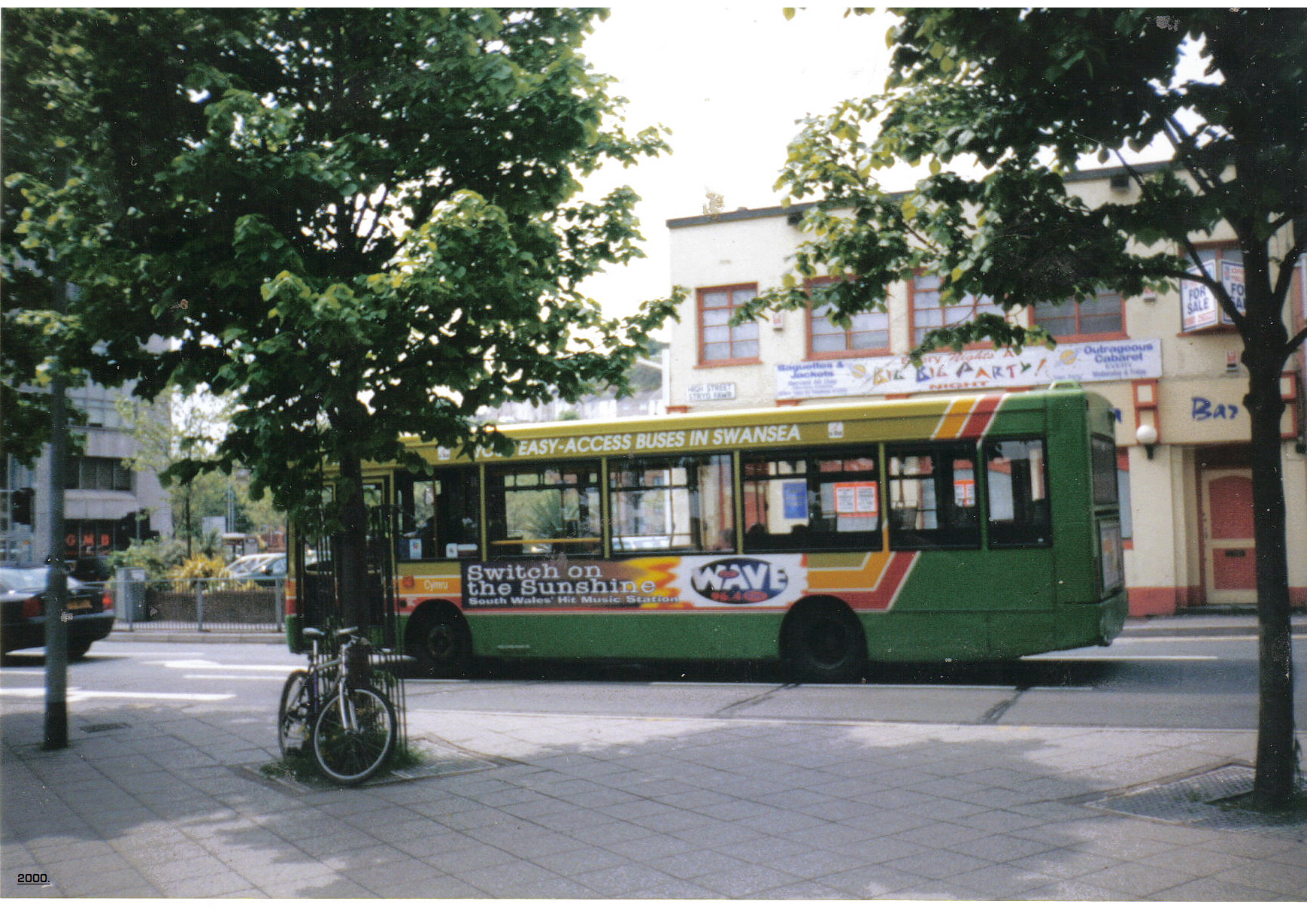
First Cymru Plaxton Pointer bodied Dennis Dart in 2000

South Wales Transport was established on 10 February 1914 as a subsidiary of the British Electric Traction (BET) to operate bus services in and around Swansea. BET already owned the Swansea Improvements and Tramway Company. The first bus routes were run as feeders to the tram network from Ynysforgan to Pontardawe, starting in May 1914 with a second service from Cwmbwrla to Llanelli in August.

The company had ambitions to operate buses throughout south and south west Wales, but initial overtures to local councils received unfavourable responses and it was decided to concentrate operations in the Swansea area. In 1920 the company took over operation of the horse-tram network in Neath from Neath Corporation.

In 1921, Swansea Council allowed the company's buses to run through to the town centre, provided that no local passengers were carried on the inner section of the route covered by the trams. Further expansion came in 1923 when Fairwood Motors was purchased along with services to the Gower peninsula, followed in 1928 by the acquisition of Isaac Jenkins' Bishopton and Murton Motors, which gave a second route to the Gower.

From a fleet of 12 buses, carrying two million passengers in 1915, by 1929 the company had expanded to a fleet of 162 buses carrying 14 million passengers per annum.

=== Road Traffic Act 1930 ===
The Road Traffic Act 1930 introduced a system of bus service licensing and gave established operators protection from competition from unlicensed rivals, which had been prevalent. Such unregulated competition had caused problems for the company, which had been facing competition on almost all of its routes. It had stopped paying dividends in 1928 and in 1931 reported a loss of £3,875 Two further acquisitions, of J M Bacus of Burry Port and the Gwendraeth Transport Company of Pontyates in 1935 brought expansion to the west of Llanelly, whilst the purchase of John Brothers of Grovesend brought services from Neath and Porthcawl to Llanelly. The stability brought about by the act and a recovery in the economy allowed the company to resume paying dividends in 1937. In the same year the Swansea tram system was replaced by the company's buses.

=== Post war expansion ===
Although South Wales Transport operated a number of interurban and rural services into Llanelly in neighbouring Carmarthenshire, the town's internal transport system was run by another operator, Llanelly District Traction, which had replaced the town's trams with a trolleybus system in 1933 covering three routes from the town's railway station to the suburbs of Pwll, Felinfoel and Loughor. This network was supplemented by a number of services operated by motor buses. The company also provided the town's electricity supply and was a subsidiary of Balfour Beatty. On nationalisation of the UK electricity generating industry in 1947 the newly-formed South Wales Electricity Board became the owner of the transport company, but sold it in 1952 to South Wales Transport, giving the company control of bus services in Llanelly, although the trolleybuses were soon replaced by motor buses.

In 1962, Ammanford-based bus operator J James & Sons sold its business to BET, which absorbed it into South Wales Transport in September of that year, giving the company a depot in that town and services from Ammanford to Llanelly, Neath and Burry Port.

With all bus operators experiencing declines in patronage and profitability it became increasingly necessary to seek economies of operation. In April 1967 South Wales Transport entered into a co-ordination agreement with the Transport Holding Company's United Welsh Services under which both operator's services in the Swansea Valley and surrounding areas were re-organised to remove duplication, saving 150,000 bus operating miles per annum (100,000 South Wales and 50,000 United Welsh). Passengers benefited from co-ordinated timetables and complete inter-availability of tickets. A similar scheme was later introduced in the Neath area.

=== Mumbles Railway ===
The Swansea and Mumbles Railway was an interurban electric tramway connecting central Swansea with the community of Mumbles. It had been leased from its owners by the Swansea Improvements and Tramway Company from 1896 until 1927 when the lease was transferred to South Wales Transport. Conversion from steam to electric traction followed in 1929. By the 1950s significant repairs and replacements were needed and passenger numbers and profitability were in decline so in 1958 South Wales Transport bought the railway outright from its owners with a view to closure, which was achieved in 1960.

=== Changes of ownership ===
Following a short post-war boom in ridership and profitability, the company, along with other UK bus operators, entered a period of decline. By the 1960s passenger numbers were falling rapidly: in 1967 by 6%, 1968 7.3%, 1969 14.7% and 1970 12.7%. In 1967 BET sold its bus interests, including South Wales Transport, to the UK Government's Transport Holding Company, which in 1969 transferred them to the National Bus Company (NBC).

In 1971, NBC re-organised its subsidiary companies in Wales with Thomas Bros, United Welsh Services and Neath & Cardiff Luxury Coaches being incorporated into an enlarged South Wales Transport. In the following year, the operations of Western Welsh west of Porthcawl, with depots in Neath and Haverfordwest, were transferred to South Wales Transport, bringing the company into Pembrokeshire for the first time. Passenger decline continued throughout the 1970s and 80s and the company required substantial financial support from local councils to keep unremunerative services operating. Between 1981 and 1984 passenger numbers declined by 24% during which time the company made a surplus of only £300,000 after receiving £6.4m in revenue support.

The Transport Act 1985 required the National Bus Company to sell its subsidiary companies to private enterprise. South Wales Transport was sold in a management buyout on 8 May 1987, after which it became independent of outside control for the first time in its history. A period of expansion followed with the development of high-frequency services operated by mini-buses and the takeover of Maesteg operators, Brewers and Llynfi Motors in 1988. Also taken over in that year were the Swansea operations of JD Cleverley of Cwmbran trading as Capitol Coaches. However, following the trend of consolidation of the newly privatised bus business the company was sold to Badgerline in 1990.

Expansion continued under Badgerline ownership, particularly in the Bridgend area after the collapse of National Welsh Omnibus Services in 1992, although the "Brewers" business, which had been retained as a separate "low-cost" operating unit, was used to run services in the town. Further consolidation saw the company included in the 16 June 1995 merger of Badgerline with GRT Group to form First Bus. The final takeover by the company came in January 1996 when it bought the local bus services in the Amman and Swansea Valleys of D Coaches, which it ran under the well-established local identities of West Wales Motors and Rees & Williams. However, First Bus shortly afterwards merged the Brewers and South Wales businesses into an expanded South Wales Transport and then began operating under the First Cymru name, with the South Wales Transport name being changed on 28 March 1999.

== Revival ==
The South Wales Transport name was revived by a bus operator in Neath in 2004. This company has no connection with the original company. In 2025 it was purchased by Tower Transit.
