= Rhondda Transport Company =

Welsh public transport operator

The Rhondda Tramways Company was incorporated on 14 April 1906 as a subsidiary of the National Electric Construction Company. The NECC was acquired, with all its subsidiary businesses, by British Electric Traction Company (BET) in 1931 In the late 19th and early 20th centuries, the BET was a major operator of tramways in the UK, and later became one of the biggest operators of motor buses in the UK.

== History ==
The Rhondda Tramways Company was set up to operate the tramway system built by Rhondda Urban District Council. Construction commenced in 1906 with the first trams running by July 1908. At its full extent in 1912 the tramway extended for 21 miles (33.8 km) centered on the town of Porth, in the Rhondda Valley in Glamorgan, south Wales. and extending to Maerdy, Treherbert, Tonypandy and Trehafod and the company owned a fleet of 54 trams.

Motor buses were introduced in 1920, initially as feeders to the tramway and a very short lived trolleybus route operated between Williamstown and Gilfach Goch in 1914-5. The tramway closed in 1934 and was replaced by motor bus services, when the company changed its name to Rhondda Transport Company.

In 1931, the National Electric Construction Company had been taken over by British Electric Traction (BET), which also owned the much-larger neighbouring Western Welsh Omnibus Company. Nevertheless, Rhondda Transport continued as a separate entity, with services extending to Cardiff, Porthcawl, Bridgend and Merthyr Tydfil, all well outside the Rhondda Valley.

Passenger numbers peaked in 1952 when 43,300,000 journeys were made annually but a steep decline set in, made worse by the economic decline of the Rhondda Valley and by the 1966 the figure was down to 22,925,000. In response, and to make economies, BET brought Rhondda Transport and Western Welsh under common management in that year..

In 1967, BET sold its bus interests, including Rhondda Transport, to the UK government, which set up the Transport Holding Company to manage them along with bus companies of the Tilling Group that it already owned. In 1969 this was replaced by the National Bus Company (NBC).

During this time the decline in passenger numbers continued and in 1971 NBC undertook a round of economies, one of which was to merge Rhondda Transport fully into the Western Welsh Omnibus Company, with "Rhondda" buses losing their identity.

== Subsequent developments ==
The "Rhondda" name was revived in 1991 for buses based at the original company's depot at Porth, although this was now owned by the privately owned National Welsh Omnibus Services, itself created in 1978 by a merger of Western Welsh and Red & White Services. National Welsh went into administrative receivership in January 1992 and ceased trading. Porth-based bus services were taken over by a new company "Rhondda Buses Ltd" which kept the "Rhondda" identity alive until 1997 when it was sold to the Stagecoach group.
