= Associated Motorways =

British bus operating company

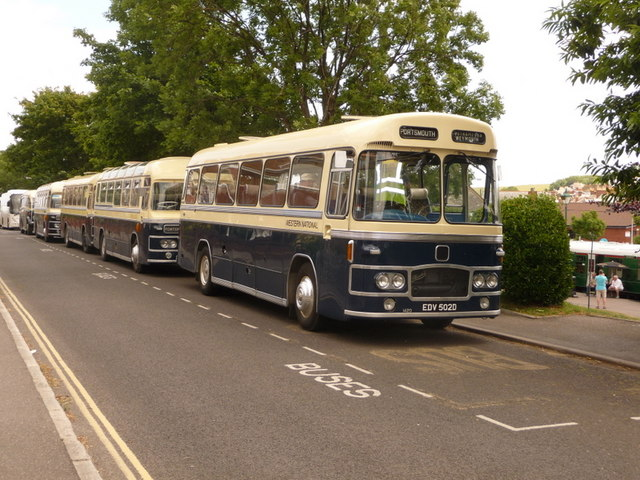
- Four preserved Royal Blue coaches in Swanage in June 2009
- Founded: 1934
- Ceased operation: 1974
- Service area: England
- Service type: Long distance coach operator
- Hubs: Cheltenham
- Operator: Black & White Motorways; Crosville; Eastern Counties; Greyhound; Lincolnshire Road Car; Midland Red; Red & White; Royal Blue; Southdown; United Counties

Associated Motorways was a consortium of motor coach operators in the south and Midlands of England, which was active from 1934 to 1974.

== History ==
An older logo dating from 1949

Associated Motorways was formed as a result of the Road Traffic Act 1930, which encouraged competing coach operators to co-ordinate their services. In 1934, six coach operators came together to form Associated Motorways, to pool their services between the Midlands and the south and west of England and between London and South Wales. The founder members were: Black & White Motorways of Cheltenham, Red & White of Chepstow, Royal Blue, Greyhound (by then owned by Bristol Tramways), Midland Red and United Counties of Northampton.

Associated Motorways did not own or operate any coaches. Each member company committed itself to providing an agreed mileage of coach journeys for Associated Motorways and took an agreed share of the profits. The pool mainly operated the hub and spoke model, the hub being Cheltenham where Black & White had opened a new coach station in 1931.

The consortium had to suspend operations during World War II from 1942 to 1946, but prospered after the war. New members joined: Lincolnshire Road Car and Eastern Counties in 1956, Crosville in 1965 and finally Southdown in 1972. All of the members except Black & White also operated their own coach services outside the consortium.

At a peak summer weekend the consortium could have over 800 coaches on the road. Every day, coaches from all over England and Wales converged on Cheltenham, where most passengers changed coaches to continue their journey. At 14:00 sharp an inspector blew his whistle, and the coaches departed en masse.

Two things killed Associated Motorways. One was the spread of the motorway network. Although motorways were good for coach services generally, they made Associated Motorways' hub and spoke model uncompetitive and obsolete. The other was the government's desire to rebrand and rationalise the coach services under its control.

Although most of the consortium members had been state-owned since 1947, nationalisation did not greatly affect Associated Motorways until the government acquired the remaining members though its acquisition of British Electric Traction in 1968. All of the members became subsidiaries of the state-owned National Bus Company in 1969. In 1973 the National Bus Company formed National Travel (later National Express) to run coach services, and all Associated Motorways' services were transferred to National Express in 1974.

Like Associated Motorways before it, National Express was a marketing operation which relied mostly on coaches supplied by other companies. But unlike Associated Motorways, National Express imposed its own National brand on the operating companies' coaches. The Cheltenham coach station finally closed in 1984.
