= Merthyr Tydfil Electric Tramways =

Tramway operator in Wales

Operation
- Locale: Merthyr Tydfil
- Open: 6 April 1901
- Close: 23 August 1939
- Status: Closed

Infrastructure
- Track gauge: 3 ft 6 in (1,067 mm)
- Propulsion system: Electric
- Depot: Trevithick Road

Merthyr Tydfil Electric Tramways operated a tramway service in Merthyr Tydfil between 1901 and 1939.

== History ==
The company was owned by the Merthyr Tydfil Electric Traction and Lighting Company, a subsidiary company of British Electric Traction. Services started on 6 April 1901. Sixteen tramcars were purchased from the Midland Railway Carriage and Wagon Company and Electric Railway and Tramway Carriage Works for the initial services.

== Closure ==
The company was purchased by the local authority in 1939 for the sum of £13,500 (equivalent to £763,000 in 2025) with the aim of closing down the service, and the final tram ran on 23 August 1939.
