= National Bus Company (UK) =

Former bus company in Great Britain (1969-1988)

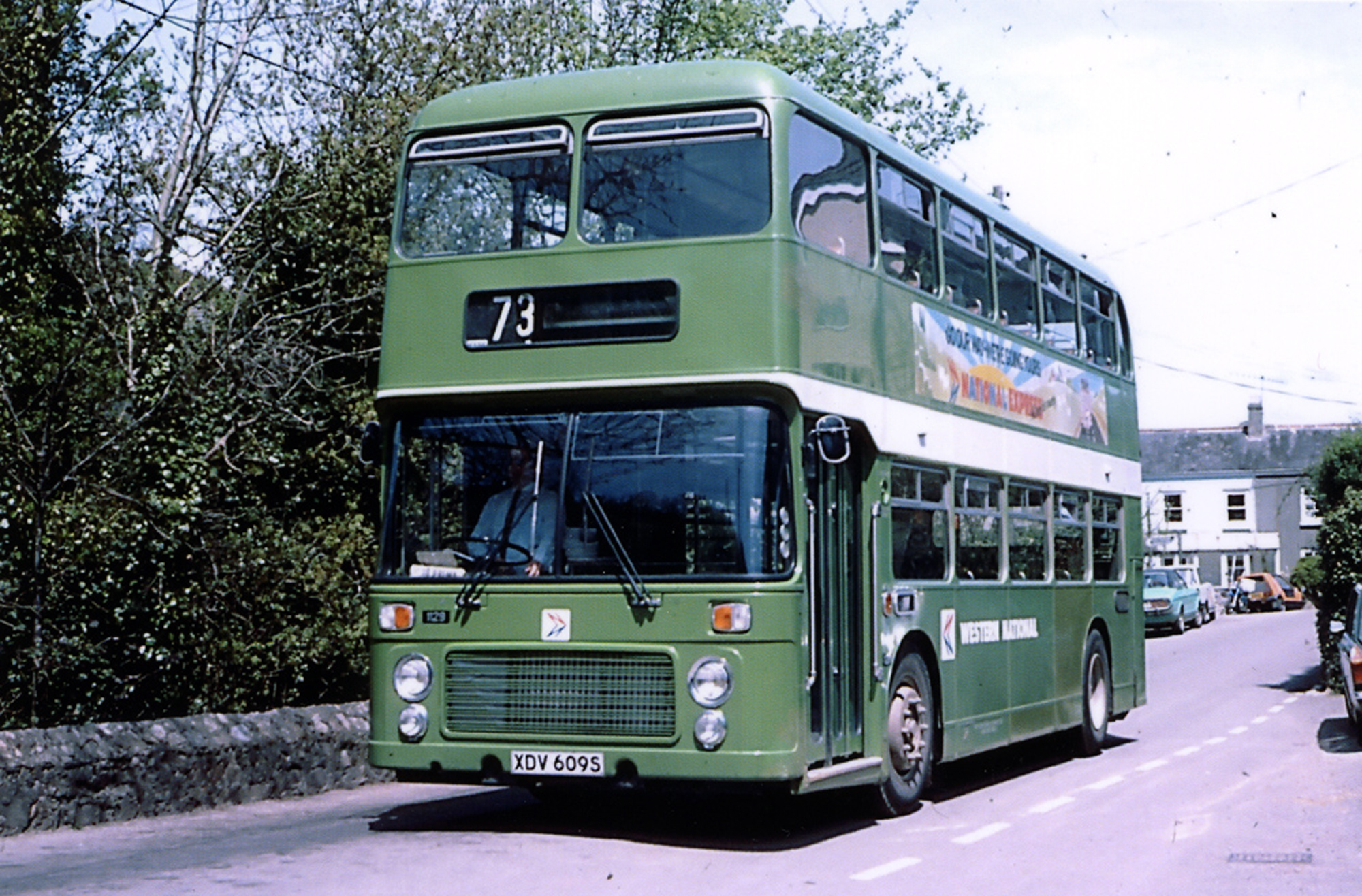
- A Western National Bristol VR in Forder, Cornwall (May 1979)
- Parent: Department for Transport
- Founded: 1 January 1969
- Ceased operation: April 1988
- Headquarters: London
- Service area: England and Wales
- Service type: Bus operator

The National Bus Company (NBC) was a nationalised bus company that operated in England and Wales between 1969 and 1988. NBC did not run buses itself, but was the owner of a number of regional subsidiary bus operating companies.

== History ==
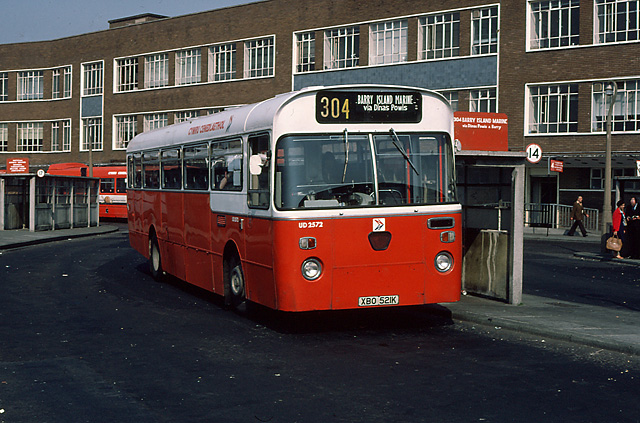
A National Welsh Omnibus Services Leyland Leopard at Cardiff Central bus station, in the poppy red and white dual purpose version of the NBC corporate livery (June 1980)

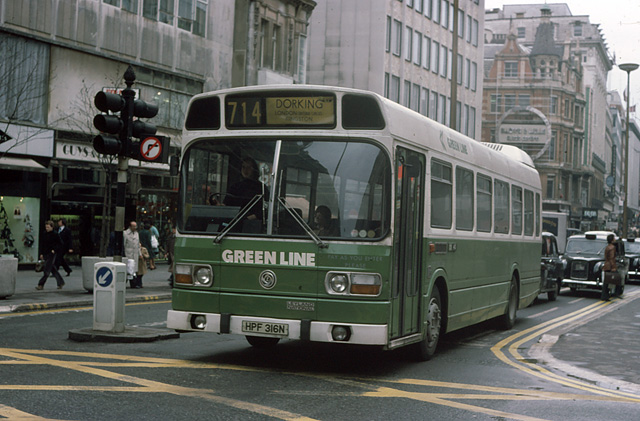
A Green Line Leyland National on Oxford Street, London (July 1976)

=== Background ===
Following the Labour Party victory at the 1966 General Election, Barbara Castle was appointed Minister for Transport. Castle immediately ordered a review of public transport, with a view to formulating a new transport policy.

Among the issues to be tackled were the ownership and operation of bus services, which were rapidly losing patronage and profitability due to increased prevalence of private motor cars. The state owned a considerable proportion of scheduled bus operators outside the major cities; it had obtained the Tilling Group companies in 1948 as a consequence of nationalising the railways, all of which had substantial shareholdings in the Tilling Group, having previously merged into it their own bus operations. The Tilling Group was subsequently placed under the ownership of the nationalised Transport Holding Company (THC). London Transport was also nationalised in 1948 and others voluntarily acquiesced; the last was Red & White in 1950. When the Labour Party suddenly lost power to the Conservatives in 1951, the nationalisation programme remained unfinished.

Castle proposed forming regional transport authorities, which would take over the THC subsidiaries and municipal transport undertakings in their area; it would also have the power to acquire private bus operators. However, in November 1967, British Electric Traction (BET) unexpectedly offered to sell its bus operations to the government. BET, which had been the only major private bus operating group, received £35 million for its 25 provincial bus companies and 11,300 vehicles. The deal meant that the state or municipal bus operators now operated some 90% of scheduled bus services in England and Wales. Instead of forming the regional authorities, the government published a white paper proposing the merger of the THC and BET organisations into a single National Bus Company.

The recommendations of the White Paper formed part of the Transport Act 1968; this also reorganised the already nationalised bus operation in Scotland, where subsidiaries formed the Scottish Bus Group.

=== Formation ===
The National Bus Company was formed on 1 January 1969.

In 1970, the company was enlarged when it acquired the country area buses of London Transport (as London Country Bus Services), the bus operations of the county boroughs of Exeter and Luton and the Gosport & Fareham Omnibus Company, trading under the name of Provincial.

Buses were operated by locally-managed subsidiary companies, with their own fleetnames and liveries. In the early years of the company, there was some rationalisation, generally leading to the amalgamation of operators into larger units and the transfer of areas between them. One was the merging of Aldershot & District with Thames Valley on 1 January 1972. Another example was the transfer of the land-locked Trowbridge operations from Western National to Bristol Omnibus in 1970.

== Corporate identity ==
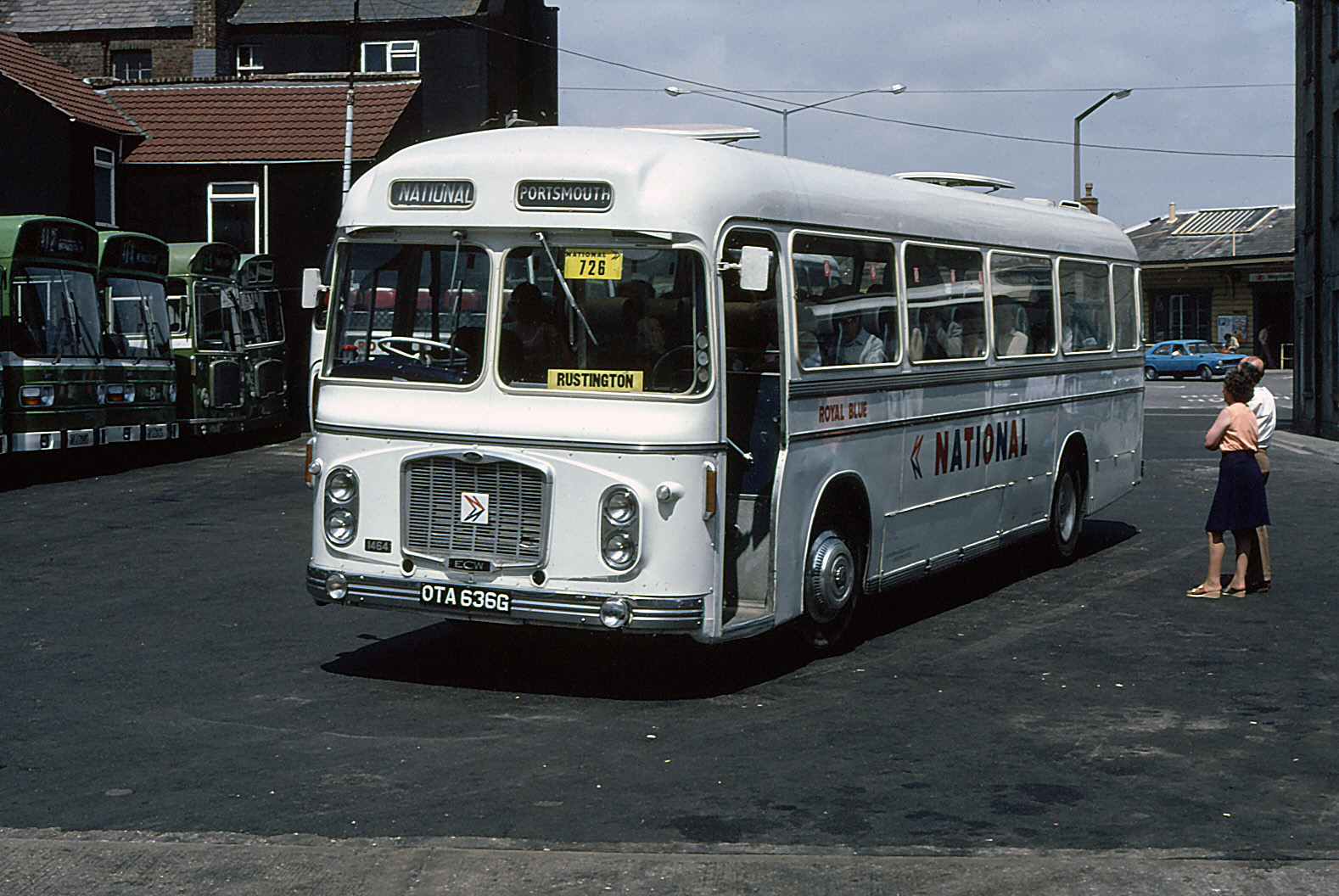
An Eastern Coach Works (ECW) bodied Bristol in Weymouth, Dorset in National Express livery (1978)

Following the appointment of Fred Wood as chairman in 1972, the National Bus Company introduced a corporate identity designed by Norman Wilson, who had previously worked with Wood to reshape the identity of the Croda International chemical company. The company's coaches, which previously carried the traditional colours of local subsidiaries, were rebranded as National; they were painted in unrelieved white, with the NBC logo and the 'NATIONAL' name in alternate red & blue letters using a bespoke typeface. The 'white coach' played a prominent part in changing the image of coach travel, taking advantage of the new national motorway network to offer a consistent national service. The services were rebranded as National Express soon afterwards. The addition of blue and white stripes appeared in 1978. National Travel was the country's first attempt at a uniformly marketable express network, which superseded Associated Motorways and the plethora of other services provided by individual NBC subsidiaries. The coaches were managed by a few areas and included travel agent booking offices based at major bus stations. A hub and spoke system operated with the main hub at Cheltenham.

Around the same time, the company launched a wide number of UK holiday services under the banner National Holidays. This brand and its travel agent booking offices existed until the mid-1990s, when the coach holiday division was closed.

The National Express overseas travel business was relaunched under the name Eurolines; this brand now operates services from the UK across Europe, booked through the main National Express website.

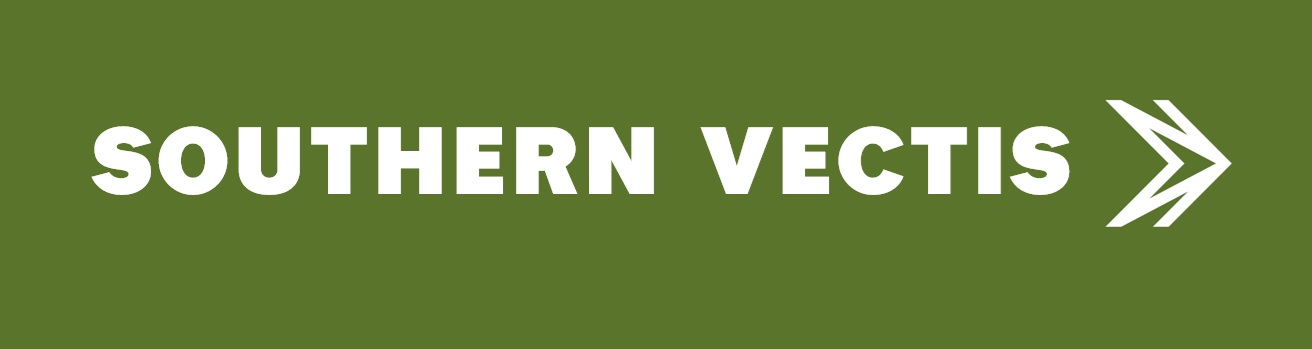
Example of Norman Wilson's NBC symbol and company identifier (fleetname) using his bespoke National lettering, in the green monochrome version of the 1972 corporate identity. Southern Vectis was one of 14 local operating companies which adopted the green version of the identity in 1972.

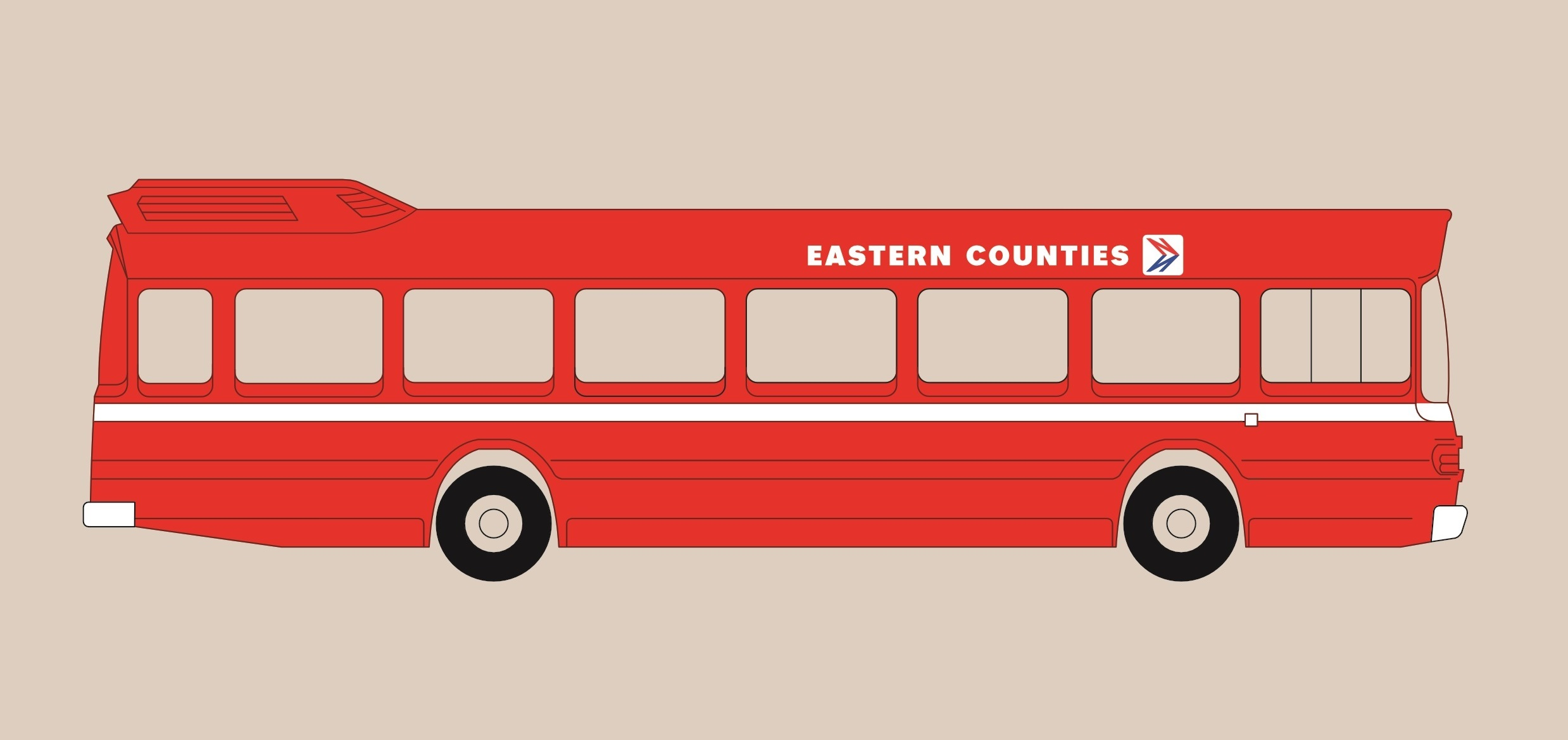
The red version of Norman Wilson's NBC identity for local buses, applied to a Leyland National as specified in his Corporate Identity Manual. Eastern Counties was one of 24 local operating companies which adopted the red version of the identity in 1972.

In the 1970s, all local service buses adopted a uniform design under Norman Wilson's corporate identity scheme, generally in either leaf green or poppy red, with white relief. All vehicles bore the local company fleetname in white, in the bespoke National lettering/Wilson National typeface designed by Wilson and based on Akzidenz-Grotesk. The fleetname was aligned with Wilson's new NBC symbol, an italicised N and its shadow forming an arrow, with the dimensions and positions precisely defined in Wilson's corporate identity manuals of 1972 and 1976. Though around 95 per cent of the company's buses appeared in one of the two standard colours, there were exceptions. Buses operating in the area of the Tyne and Wear Passenger Transport Executive used yellow in a similar fashion to the PTE's own fleet, but to the NBC specifications for layout and colour; some buses operating within West Yorkshire were liveried in WYPTE verona green and cream; Jones (Aberbeeg) was liveried in blue; and local subsidiaries East Yorkshire, Midland General and the Northern General subsidiary, Sunderland District, also retained blue for short periods.

== Area of operation ==
Although NBC operated throughout England and Wales, it was not a monopoly. Services were provided by London Transport in Greater London, the fleets of the municipal bus companies and passenger transport executives, and by independent operators in some rural areas and a few small towns.

== Bus manufacture ==
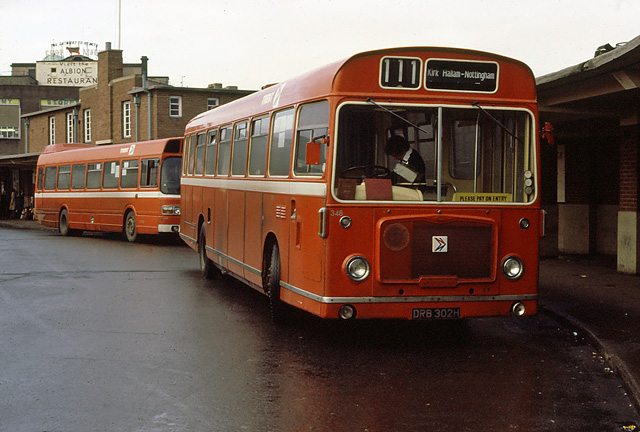
A Trent Motor Traction ECW-bodied Bristol RE and a Leyland National at Derby bus station (January 1980)

The NBC inherited 75% shareholdings in chassis manufacturer Bristol Commercial Vehicles and body builder Eastern Coach Works (ECW) from the Transport Holding Company. In 1969, NBC formed a joint venture with British Leyland (which owned the other 25% of Bristol and ECW); British Leyland became a 50% owner of the NBC's manufacturing companies. The joint venture designed and built a new single-deck bus, the Leyland National. The first was delivered in 1972 and it remained in production until 1986; it was also available to other bus operators. In 1982, NBC sold its 50% interest in the joint venture (including Bristol and ECW) to British Leyland.

== Service reforms ==
In the late 1970s and early 1980s, services were reviewed under a process known within instigator Midland Red as the Viable Network Project and subsequently more generally as the Market Analysis Project (MAP). This followed on from the West Oxfordshire Market Analysis Project conducted in 1975, by the newly formed Public Transport Unit of Oxfordshire County Council. With an all-county remit, Oxfordshire included services from the Banbury area running into the West Oxfordshire survey area. Having assisted in the programme and been fully informed as to the findings, the Midland Red Area Manager (Brian Barrett) was able to recommend that the programme should be extended elsewhere within National Bus Company.

Conscious of the very limited information on their market (their passengers), NBC extended the programme throughout the areas served by the subsidiary companies. Each company carefully considered its existing and potential new demands, surveyed both on and off bus, and recast local networks to reflect the results; they indicated to local authorities those services requiring subsidy. As part of the MAP, local area identities were invariably introduced, with new fleet names applied to buses, bus stops, timetables and publicity. The process culminated in the splitting of several larger NBC subsidiaries.

== Deregulation and privatisation ==
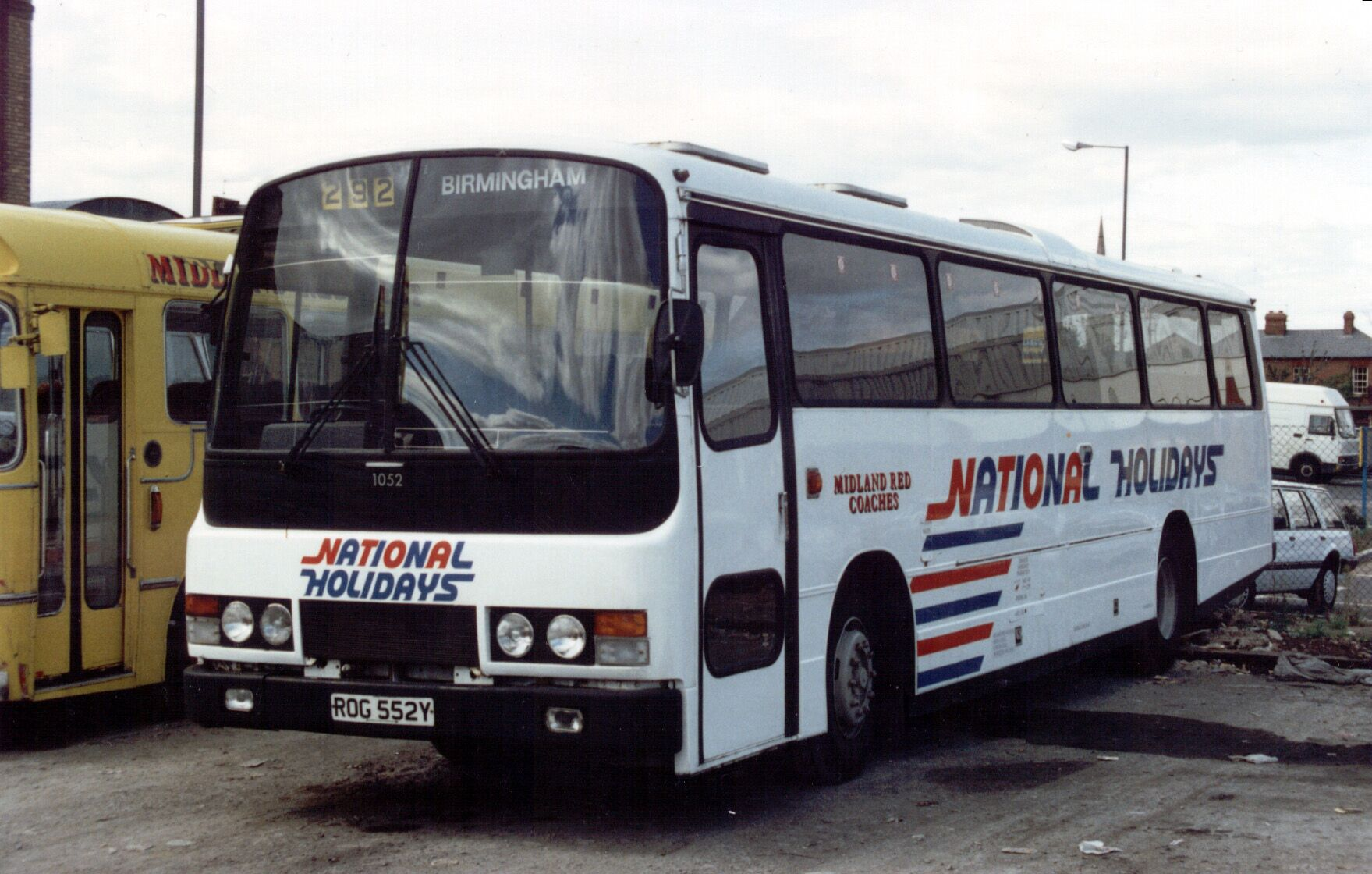
A Midland Red ECW-bodied Leyland Leopard in National Holidays livery

From 1986, bus services in the UK were deregulated and progressively privatised, with the remaining larger companies forcibly broken up.

NBC was divided into 70 units, with the first sale being of National Holidays to Pleasurama in July 1986. The last sale was completed in April 1988.

The sales spawned a renewed interest in individual liveries and the double-N logo disappeared. However, it was kept by National Express when it was sold to their management and continued to be used until 2003, when the NBC logo finally disappeared in favour of a new logo; it was later replaced in 2007. Most local companies passed from state control to management buyouts. The independence of many however, was short lived, as they were acquired by the emerging large private bus groups, represented today by:

- Arriva
- FirstGroup
- Go-Ahead Group
- Mobico Group
- RATP Group
- Stagecoach Group
- Transdev
- Transport UK Group.

The company was dissolved on 1 April 1991 by the National Bus Company (Dissolution) Order 1991 (SI 1991/510).

== Subsidiaries ==
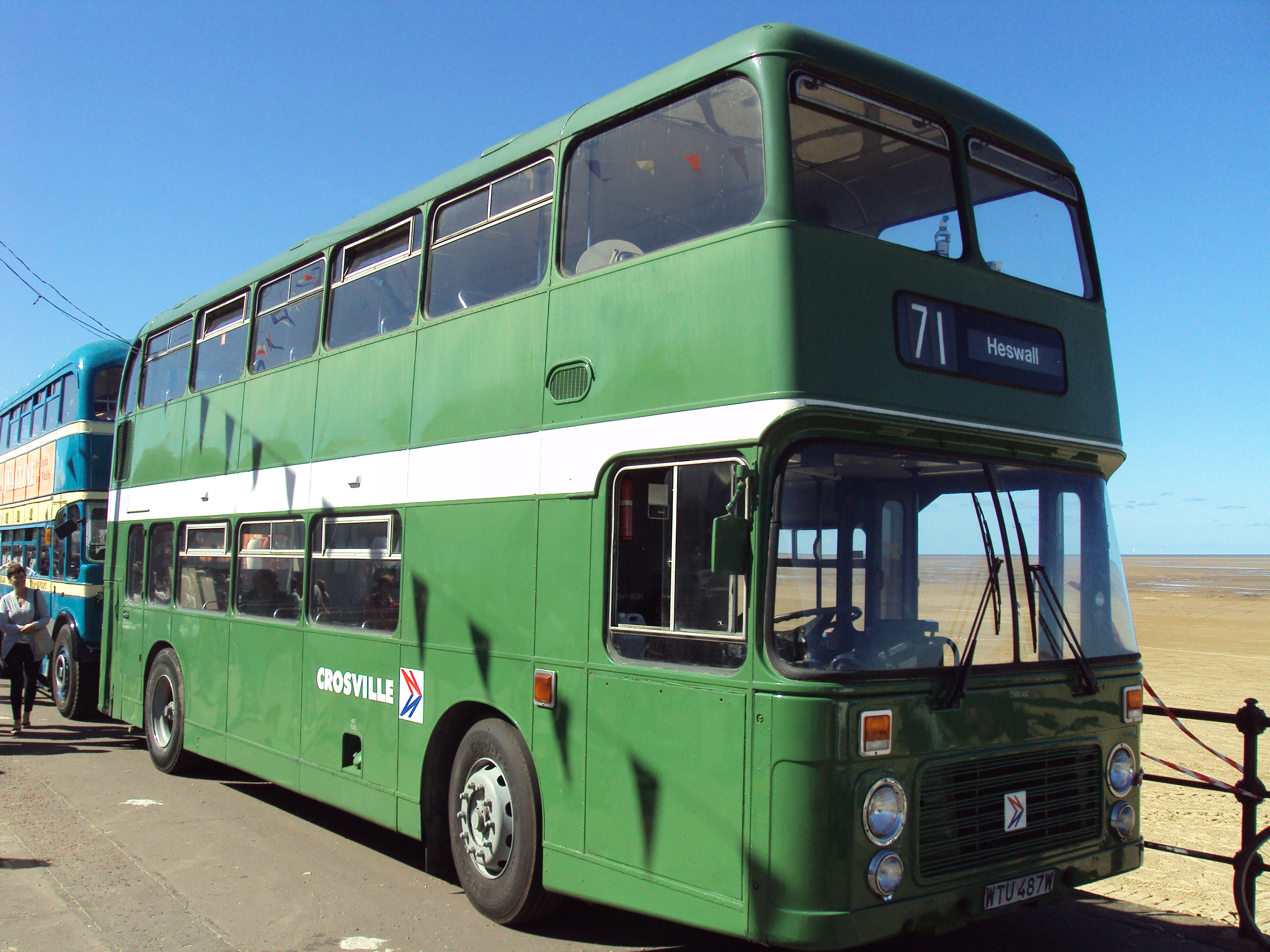
A preserved former-Crosville ECW-bodied Bristol VR (August 2010)

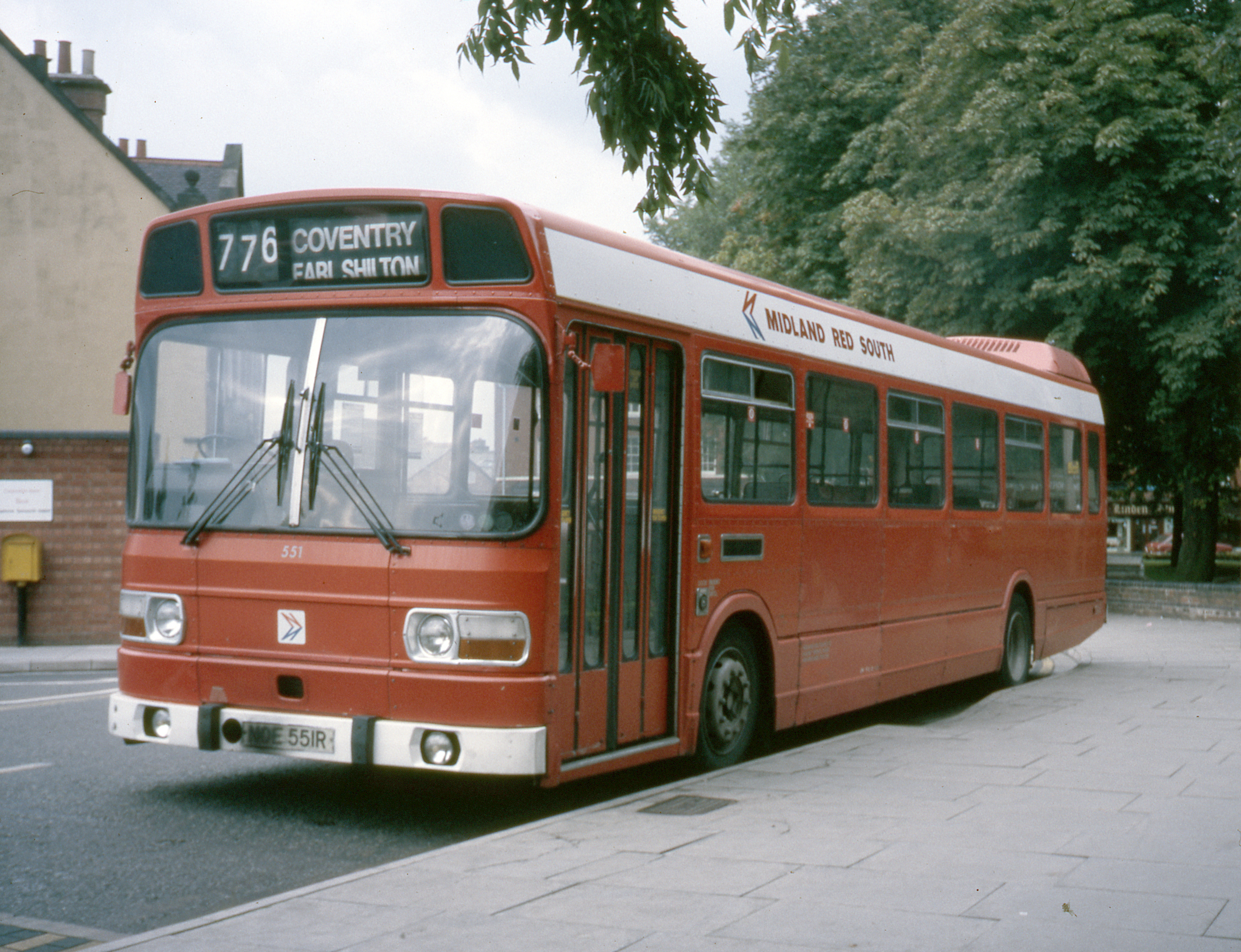
A Midland Red West Leyland National in Tamworth, Staffordshire (1986)

=== Original companies ===
The original bus and coach operating subsidiaries of the National Bus Company in 1969 and 1970 were:

- Aldershot & District Traction Co. Ltd. – merged into Thames Valley & Aldershot in 1972
- Bath Services (i.e. Bath Electric Tramways Ltd. and Bath Tramways Motor Co. Ltd.) – Bristol subsidiaries, absorbed by Bristol in 1969
- Black & White Motorways Ltd. (coaches only) – merged into National Travel (South West) in 1974
- Brighton, Hove & District Omnibus Co. Ltd. – absorbed by Southdown 1969.
- Bristol Omnibus Co. Ltd., including Bristol Joint Services (a joint undertaking of the company and Bristol City Council) and services leased from the county borough of Gloucester, operated under the Gloucester fleetname
- Charlie's Cars (Bournemouth) Ltd. (coaches only) – Shamrock & Rambler subsidiary, absorbed by Shamrock & Rambler in 1972
- Cheltenham District Traction Co. Ltd. – Bristol subsidiary
- County Motors (Lepton) Ltd. – owned jointly by West Riding, Yorkshire Traction and Yorkshire Woollen; absorbed by Yorkshire Traction in 1969
- Crosville Motor Services Ltd.
- Cumberland Motor Services Ltd.
- Devon General Omnibus & Touring Co. Ltd., including Grey Cars coach operation. Absorbed by Western National in 1971
- East Kent Road Car Co. Ltd.
- East Midland Motor Services Ltd.
- East Yorkshire Motor Services Ltd.
- Eastern Counties Omnibus Co. Ltd.
- Eastern National Omnibus Co. Ltd.
- Gateshead & District Omnibus Co. Ltd. - Northern General subsidiary, absorbed by Northern General in 1976.
- Greenslade's Tours Ltd. (coaches only) – Devon General subsidiary, merged into National Travel (South West) in 1974
- Hants & Dorset Motor Services Ltd.
- Hebble Motor Services Ltd. - became part of West Riding group in 1969 and absorbed Yorkshire Woollen's coach fleet in 1970. Bus operations were transferred to West Yorkshire and the Halifax Joint Omnibus Committee in 1970 and 1971 respectively. Hebble thereafter operated coaches only. Merged into National Travel (North East) in 1974
- Jones Omnibus Services Ltd. - independent operator acquired in 1969 and operated as a subsidiary of Red & White. Became part of Western Welsh group in 1974; merged into National Welsh in 1978
- Keighley–West Yorkshire Services Ltd. – owned jointly by West Yorkshire and the Borough of Keighley. Absorbed by West Yorkshire in 1974
- Lincolnshire Road Car Co. Ltd.
- London Country - established on 1 January 1970 to take over the country area services of London Transport; included Green Line coach services
- Maidstone & District Motor Services Ltd.
- Mansfield District Traction Co. Ltd. – Midland General subsidiary, absorbed by East Midland in1972.
- Mexborough & Swinton Traction Co. Ltd. – absorbed by Yorkshire Traction in 1969
- Midland General Omnibus Co. Ltd. – absorbed by Trent in 1972
- Midland Red (i.e. Birmingham & Midland Motor Omnibus Co. Ltd.) – renamed Midland Red Omnibus Co. Ltd. in March 1974
- Neath & Cardiff Luxury Coaches Ltd. (coaches only) - split between Western Welsh and South Wales in 1970–71
- Notts & Derby (i.e. Nottinghamshire & Derbyshire Traction Co. Ltd.) – Midland General subsidiary, absorbed by Trent in 1972
- North Western Road Car Co. Ltd. – Bus operations split between SELNEC PTE, Crosville and Trent in 1972. North Western thereafter operated coaches only. Renamed National Travel (North West) in 1974
- Northern General Transport Co. Ltd.
- Oxford (i.e. City of Oxford Motor Services Ltd.)
- Potteries Motor Traction Co. Ltd.
- Provincial (i.e. Gosport & Fareham Omnibus Co. Ltd.) – acquired from the Swaine Group on 1 January 1970 and operated as a Hants & Dorset subsidiary
- Red & White Services Ltd. – became part of Western Welsh group from 1974. Merged into National Welsh 1978
- Rhondda Transport Co. Ltd. – absorbed by Western Welsh in 1971
- Ribble Motor Services Ltd.
- Samuelson New Transport Co. Ltd. (coaches only) – merged into National Travel (South East) in 1974
- Shamrock & Rambler Motor Coaches Ltd. (coaches only) – Hants & Dorset subsidiary, merged into National Travel (South West) 1974.
- Sheffield United Tours Ltd. (coaches only) – merged into National Travel (North East) in 1974
- South Wales Transport Co. Ltd.
- Southdown Motor Services Ltd.
- Southern National Omnibus Co. Ltd. – absorbed by Western National in 1969
- Southern Vectis Omnibus Co. Ltd., including Crinage's and Fountain Coaches coaching units
- W.C. Standerwick Ltd. (coaches only) - Ribble subsidiary, absorbed by National Travel (North West) in 1974
- Stratford Blue (i.e. Stratford-upon-Avon Blue Motors Ltd.) – Midland Red subsidiary, absorbed by Midland Red in 1971
- Sunderland District Omnibus Co. Ltd. – Northern General subsidiary, absorbed by Northern General 1975.
- Thames Valley Traction Co. Ltd., including South Midland coach unit. South Midland transferred to City of Oxford in 1971, Thames Valley merged into Thames Valley & Aldershot in 1972
- Thomas Bros. (Port Talbot) Ltd. – absorbed by South Wales in 1971
- Tilling's Travel (NBC) Ltd. (coaches only) – Eastern National subsidiary, absorbed by Eastern National in 1970 but re-established in 1971. Merged into National Travel (South East) in 1974
- A. Timpson & Sons Ltd. (coaches only) – merged into National Travel (South East) in 1974
- Trent Motor Traction Co. Ltd.
- Tyneside Omnibus Co. Ltd. – Northern General subsidiary, absorbed by Northern General in 1976
- Tynemouth & District Transport Co. Ltd. – Northern General subsidiary, absorbed by Northern General in 1975
- United Automobile Services Ltd.
- United Counties Omnibus Co. Ltd.
- United Welsh Services Ltd. – Absorbed by South Wales in 1971
- Venture Transport Co. Ltd. – acquired by NBC in 1970 and became a Northern General subsidiary. Absorbed by Northern General in 1975
- West Riding Automobile Co. Ltd.
- West Yorkshire Road Car Co. Ltd., including operation of York-West Yorkshire joint committee services provided on behalf of the County Borough of York
- Wakefield's Motors Ltd. (coaches only) - Tynemouth & District subsidiary, absorbed by Tynemouth & District in 1970
- Western National Omnibus Co. Ltd., including Royal Blue coach operation joint with Southern National
- Western Welsh Omnibus Co. Ltd.
- Wilts & Dorset Motor Services Ltd. – Hants & Dorset subsidiary, absorbed by Hants & Dorset in 1972
- Yorkshire Traction Co. Ltd.
- Yorkshire Woollen District Transport Co. Ltd - became part of the West Riding group in 1969.

In addition, another NBC subsidiary, Amalgamated Passenger Transport Ltd, inherited the former British Railways/THC shareholdings in several further Joint Omnibus Committees (JOC) in Yorkshire. These comprised Halifax JOC and Todmorden JOC (merged to form Calderdale JOC in 1971), Huddersfield JOC, and Sheffield JOC.

=== Consolidation ===
During its early years, NBC pursued a policy of merging smaller subsidiaries to form larger regional companies. At the same time, some depots were transferred between subsidiaries to reduce overlap between operating territories. In addition to those businesses inherited from the Transport Holding Company, NBC took over the municipal bus operations in Exeter and Luton during 1970, with these operations being absorbed by Devon General and United Counties respectively; the country area services of London Transport also passed to NBC in 1970 as London Country.

Notable independent operators acquired during this period included Jones of Aberbeeg, Venture of Consett, Provincial of Fareham and Wessex of Bristol, which were (at least initially) retained as subsidiaries. In 1974, the coach-only subsidiaries consolidated into four National Travel companies, while a fifth was established to take over another independent coach operator, Don Everall of Wolverhampton.

On the other hand, the NBC shareholdings in Huddersfield and Sheffield JOCs were sold to the respective local authorities in 1969, and most of Hebble's bus operations passed to the jointly owned Halifax JOC during 1970. The 1968 Transport Act gave the new passenger transport executives the right to purchase any bus operations within their territories, including those of the National Bus Company. Not all of the PTEs chose to exercise this power but, on 1 January 1972, SELNEC PTE purchased the majority of North Western Road Car, and in 1973 the services of Midland Red within the West Midlands PTE passed to that executive. In 1974, the remaining NBC interest in Calderdale JOC was acquired by the newly-formed West Yorkshire PTE.

By 1978, the following bus operating companies existed:

- Alder Valley – formed on 1 January 1972 from Aldershot & District and Thames Valley
- Bristol – absorbed Cheltenham District Traction in 1975, separate Cheltenham fleetname retained
- Crosville
- Cumberland
- Devon General – became a subsidiary of Western National in 1971
- East Kent
- East Midland – absorbed Mansfield District in 1975, separate Mansfield fleetname retained
- East Yorkshire
- Eastern Counties
- Eastern National
- Hants & Dorset – absorbed Wilts & Dorset in 1972
- Jones – finally absorbed by National Welsh in 1980
- Lincolnshire
- London Country
- Maidstone & District
- Midland Red (Birmingham and Midland Motor Omnibus Company) – absorbed Stratford Blue in 1971
- National Travel London – formed in 1974 from Samuelson, Timpson's and Tillings (as National Travel South East); renamed in 1978
- National Travel East – formed in 1973 (as National Travel North East) from Hebble, Sheffield United Tours; renamed in 1977
- National Travel South West – formed in 1973 from Black & White, Greenslades and Grey Cars
- National Travel West - formed in 1977 from National Travel North West (formed in 1974 from Standerwick) and National Travel Midlands (formed in 1973 from part of former South Midland)
- National Welsh – formed 1978 from Western Welsh (which had absorbed Rhondda in 1971) and Red and White
- Northern General – absorbed Sunderland District, Tynemouth & District and Venture in 1975; absorbed Tyneside, Gateshead & District in 1976
- Oxford (City of Oxford Motor Services) – absorbed South Midland inJanuary 1971
- Potteries Motor Traction
- Provincial (Gosport & Fareham Omnibus Company)
- Ribble
- South Wales – absorbed Neath & Cardiff, Thomas Bros and United Welsh in 1971
- Southdown – absorbed Brighton, Hove & District in March 1974
- Southern Vectis
- Trent Motor Traction, absorbed Midland General in 1971
- United Automobile Services
- United Counties
- West Riding
- West Yorkshire
- Western National
- Yorkshire Traction
- Yorkshire Woollen – under West Riding management.

=== Break-up and privatisation ===
In 1981, Midland Red, weakened by losing its core area, was broken into six smaller operating companies. Most of the National Travel companies were closed down in the mid-1980s, with coaches mainly going to local bus companies. Wessex National was formed from part of National Travel South West, and Pilgrim Coaches from part of National Travel West.

NBC bus-operating subsidiaries in 1981
1. United Automobile Services; 2. Northern General; 3. Cumberland; 4. Ribble; 5. West Yorkshire; 6. East Yorkshire; 7. West Riding / Yorkshire Woollen; 8. Yorkshire Traction; 9. East Midland / Mansfield; 10. Lincolnshire; 11. Potteries Motor Traction; 12. Trent Motor Traction; 13. Midland Red; 14. Crosville; 15. United Counties; 16. Eastern Counties; 17. South Wales / De Cymru; 18. National Welsh / Cymru Cenedlaethol; 19. Bristol; 20. Oxford South Midland; 21. Eastern National; 22. Alder Valley; 23. London Country / Green Line; 24. Western National / Devon General; 25. Hants & Dorset; 26. Southern Vectis; 27. Provincial; 28. Southdown; 29. Maidstone & District; 30. East Kent

In preparation for the introduction of deregulation in 1986, and for privatisation soon after, many of the companies were broken up into smaller units. In some cases, the names of earlier companies – such as Wilts & Dorset or North Western – were revived, although often with quite different areas from their namesakes.

NBC bus-operating subsidiaries at privatisation
1. Northumbria; 2. Northern General; 3. United; 4. Cumberland; 5. Ribble; 6. West Yorkshire; 7. East Yorkshire; 8. West Riding / Yorkshire Woollen; 9. Yorkshire Traction; 10. North Western; 11. Crosville; 12. East Midland / Mansfield; 13. Lincolnshire; 14. Potteries Motor Traction; 15. Trent Motor Traction; 16. Crosville Wales; 17. Midland Red North; 18. Midland Red West; 19. Midland Fox; 20. Midland Red South; 21. United Counties; 22. Cambus; 23. Milton Keynes City Bus; 24. Eastern Counties; 25. Luton & District; 26. Eastern National/Thamesway; 27. South Wales / De Cymru; 28. National Welsh / Cymru Cenedlaethol; 29. Cheltenham & Gloucester; 30. Oxford; 31. South Midland; 32. Badgerline; 33. Bristol; 34. Western National; 35. North Devon (Red Bus); 36. Devon General; 37. Southern National; 38. Wilts & Dorset; 39. Hampshire Bus; 40. Southern Vectis; 41. Provincial; 42. The Beeline; 43. Alder Valley South; 44. Southdown; 45. Brighton & Hove Bus & Coach Company; 46. London Country North West; 47. London Country North East; 48. London Country South West; 49. Kentish Bus; 50. Hastings & District; 51. Maidstone & District; 52. East Kent

Original company	Year of split	Companies formed	Privatisation
Alder Valley	1986	Alder Valley North – renamed The Beeline	1987
Alder Valley	1986	Alder Valley South	1987
Bristol	1983	Bristol (Cityline)	1987
Bristol	1983	Badgerline	1986
Bristol	1983	Cheltenham & Gloucester	1986
Crosville	1986	Crosville	1988
Crosville	1986	Crosville Wales	1987
Cumberland	Gained Ribble's North Cumbrian operations in 1986	Cumberland	1987
East Kent	n/a	East Kent	1987
East Midland	n/a	East Midland	1988
East Yorkshire	n/a	East Yorkshire	1987
Eastern Counties	1984	Ambassador Travel	1987
Eastern Counties	1984	Cambus	1986
Eastern Counties	1984	Eastern Counties	1986
Eastern National	1986	Eastern National/Thamesway	1986
Hants & Dorset	1983	Hampshire Bus	1987
Hants & Dorset	1983	Shamrock & Rambler	1987
Hants & Dorset	1983	Wilts & Dorset	1987
Lincolnshire	n/a	Lincolnshire	1988
London Country	1986	London Country North East	1988
London Country	1986	London Country North West	1988
London Country	1986	London Country South East – renamed Kentish Bus	1988
London Country	1986	London Country South West	1988
Maidstone & District	1986	Hastings & District	1987
Maidstone & District	1986	Maidstone & District	1987
Midland Red	1981	Midland Red East - renamed Midland Fox	1987
Midland Red	1981	Midland Red Express – renamed Midland Red Coaches	1986
Midland Red	1981	Midland Red North	1988
Midland Red	1981	Midland Red South	1987
Midland Red	1981	Midland Red West	1986
National Travel East	n/a	National Travel East	1987
National Welsh	n/a	National Welsh	1987
Northern General	n/a	Northern General	1987
Oxford	1986	Oxford Bus Company	1987
Oxford	1986	South Midland	1986
Pilgrim Coaches	n/a	Pilgrim Coaches Limited	1987
Potteries	n/a	PMT Limited	1986
Provincial	Gained part of Hants & Dorset 1983	Provincial Bus Company	1987
Ribble	1986 Transfer of North Cumbrian operations	Cumberland	1988
Ribble	1986	North Western	1988
Ribble	1986	Ribble	1988
South Wales	n/a	SWT	1987
Southdown	1986	Brighton & Hove Bus & Coach Company	1987
Southdown	1986	Southdown	1987
Southern Vectis	n/a	Southern Vectis	1986
Trent	n/a	Trent Motor Traction	1986
United	1986	Northumbria	1987
United	1986	United	1987
United Counties	1986	Luton & District	1987
United Counties	1986	Milton Keynes City Bus	1987
United Counties	1986	United Counties	1987
Wessex National	n/a	Wessex National Limited	1987
West Riding / Yorkshire Woollen	n/a	West Riding	1987
West Yorkshire	n/a	West Yorkshire	1987
Western National / Devon General	1983	Devon General	1986
Western National / Devon General	1983	North Devon (Red Bus)	1988
Western National / Devon General	1983	Southern National	1988
Western National / Devon General	1983	Western National	1987
Yorkshire Traction	n/a	Yorkshire Traction	1987

Two additional non-bus-operating subsidiaries were also disposed of in 1988:

- National Express was sold to its management.
- Victoria Coach Station passed to the state-owned London Transport.

The Scarborough operations of United Automobile Services passed to East Yorkshire Motor Services in September 1986.
