= Western Welsh =

Bus operator in South Wales and the West of England

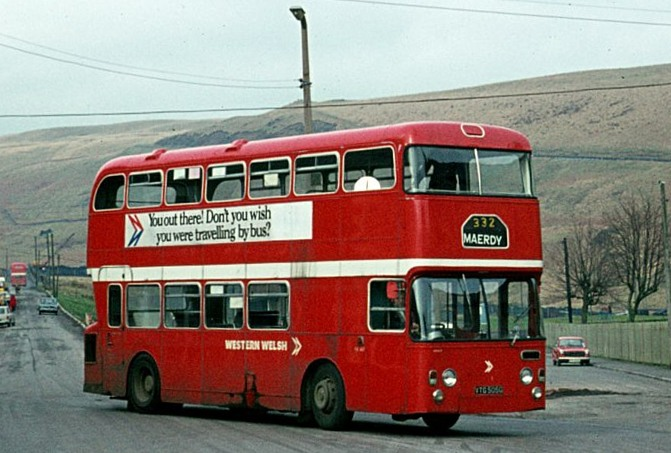
- Northern Counties bodied Leyland Atlantean in Maerdy in March 1975
- Parent: Great Western Railway (1929—1931); British Electric Traction (1931—1969); National Bus Company (1969—1978)
- Founded: 1920; 106 years ago
- Defunct: 17 April 1978; 48 years ago
- Headquarters: Cardiff, Wales
- Locale: South Wales; West Country
- Service type: Bus and coach

Western Welsh was a Welsh bus operating company, based in Cardiff covering South Wales and the northern parts of the West Country. Formed in 1920, it was nationalised when British Electric Traction sold their bus interests to the Transport Holding Company in 1967. From 1969, Western Welsh became a part of the National Bus Company and several years later, was a component of the newly formed, but ill-fated, National Welsh operation.

== History ==
Western Welsh Omnibus Company Ltd was founded 1^{st} April 1929 by the Great Western Railway (GWR) and the National Electric Construction Co. (NECC), with each holding 50% of the shares and appointing half the Directors. The new company then absorbed all the bus operations of the GWR in their South Wales Division, and the bus operations of NECC run by South Wales Commercial Motors, which itself had two subsidiary companies – Lewis & James Ltd (Western Valley Services) and Eastern Valley Services (Barretts) Ltd. Until the end of July 1929 each company continued to run their own services under the Western Welsh brand, but the merger was put into full effect on the 1^{st} August 1929 when the staff of the constituent businesses transferred to the new company. Railway staff were given the option of remaining with the GWR, usually in goods and parcels delivery roles, or to transfer to Western Welsh with protected terms of employment and continuing membership of the NUR. .

The Great Western Railway (GWR) had launched their first motor bus service between Helston and the Lizard in Cornwall on the 17^{th} August 1903, which was the first railway owned motor bus service in Britain. The GWR opened their first depot in South Wales at Abergavenny on the 1^{st} July 1905 with a route between the railway stations at Abergavenny and Brecon serving Crickhowell and other intermediate communities. The bus carried parcels and small goods as well as passengers, and also mail from Brecon to Abergavenny to connect with the mail train to Newport. .

By the time of the merger with NECC the GWR had 13 depots in South Wales with 93 buses, mainly in rural areas. These were at Abergavenny, Llandyssul, Carmarthen, St Davids, Neath, Crosshands, Cardigan, Ammanford, Brecon, Pontypool, Aberdare, Llanwrda and Usk, and workshops at Neath and Abergavenny.

NECC contributed the bus operations of their subsidiary South Wales Commercial Motors. NECC also owned Rhondda Tramways which was not included in the merger because the GWR had no powers to own a company operating tramways.

South Wales Commercial Motors had been established in 1920 in Cardiff by a brewing family, and had grown by acquisition, eventually operating bus services mainly in the South Wales coal mining districts. The company had two subsidiary companies – Lewis & James Ltd (Western Valley Services) and Eastern Valley Services (Barretts) Ltd.

There was very little overlap between the GWR depots mainly in rural areas, and those of NECC in the Valleys.

At the time of the merger the GWR had planned an express service between Cardiff and Aberystwyth. This service was the first new route introduced by Western Welsh on 1^{st} July 1929.

In 1931, the GWR sold their bus company shareholdings to British Electric Traction (BET), who continued expansion of Western Welsh by acquisition. As with other BET companies, Western Welsh's fleet included a significant number of AEC and Leyland vehicles, including AEC Bridgemasters and Albion Nimbuses, all of which appeared in the company's all-red livery.

After BET sold its operations to the government, in January 1969, Western Welsh became part of the National Bus Company (NBC). Between 1970 and 1972, the NBC transferred Western Welsh's operations west of Bridgend to its subsidiaries South Wales Transport and Crosville Motor Services. The company continued to operate further east until 1978, when it was merged with Red & White Services, with whom it operated services jointly, to form National Welsh Omnibus Services.
