= Red & White Services =

English bus company

- Industry: Transport
- Founded: 1929; 96 years ago
- Defunct: 1978
- Area served: South East Wales; Gloucestershire, England

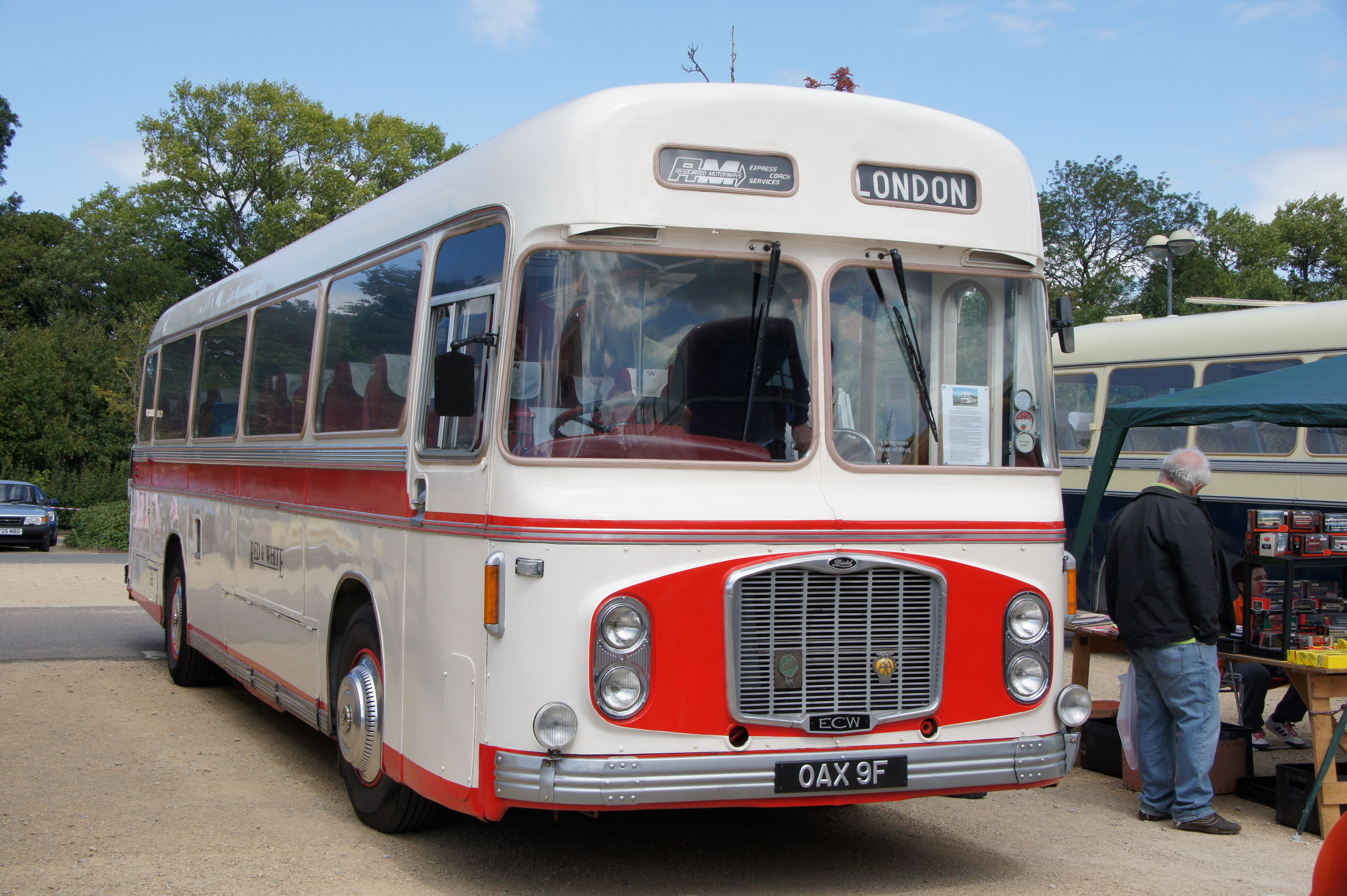
Preserved Red & White 1968 Bristol RE coach with Eastern Coach Works body

Red & White Services was a bus company operating in south east Wales and Gloucestershire, England between 1929 and 1978.

Red & White evolved into Red & White United Transport Ltd, formed in 1937, which owned bus and road freight companies in the United Kingdom and Southern Africa. When the group's UK bus interests were sold to the British Transport Commission in 1950, the group changed its name to United Transport Company.

== Early history ==
In 1921, John Watts of Lydney, Gloucestershire, started two bus companies. One, Gloucestershire Transport, ran local bus services around Lydney. The other, The Valleys Motor Bus Services, ran buses around Tredegar in South Wales. Both companies expanded rapidly by acquiring nearby operators. In 1926, the Lydney business adopted the name Gloster (Red & White) Services. By 1928, the companies were operating buses between Gloucester, Hereford and South Wales.

In 1929, John Watts formed Red & White Services Ltd to bring together the various bus companies he had formed or acquired.

In 1929, Red & White entered the long-distance coach market, initially from Gloucester and between London and South Wales. In the early 1930s, coach operators were acquired further afield, with services between London, Liverpool and Glasgow and between Cardiff and Blackpool. In 1934, Red & White was one of the founder members of the Associated Motorways consortium.

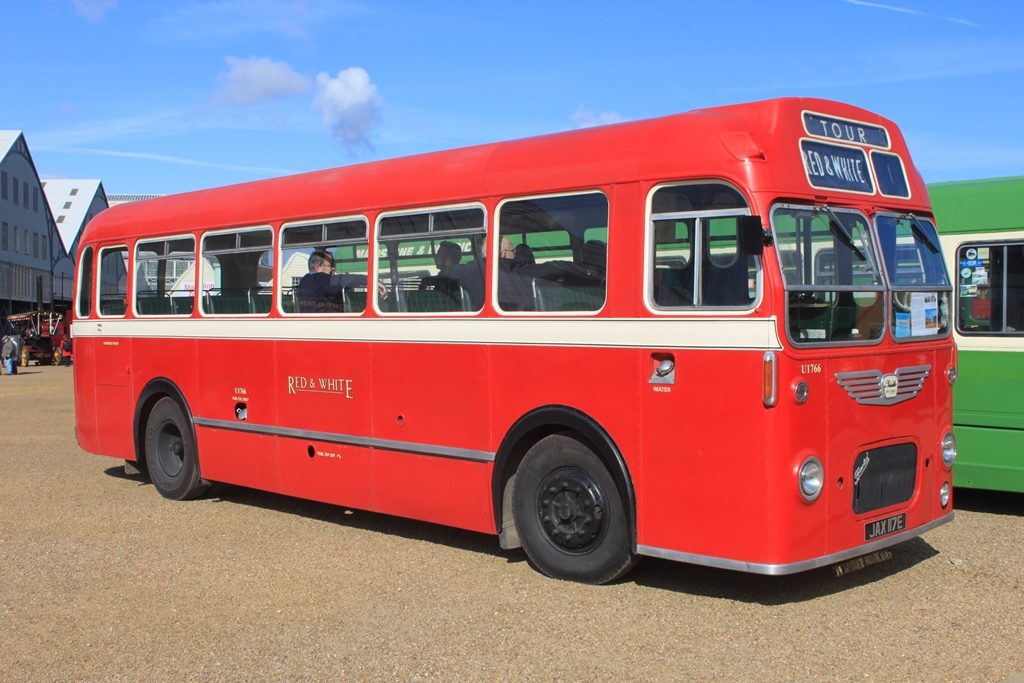
Preserved Red & White 1967 Bristol MW bus with Eastern Coach Works body

The company expanded rapidly in the 1930s, by now from new headquarters in Chepstow. It acquired several bus companies in the Swansea area and elsewhere in South Wales. In 1933, Red & White acquired the business of Red Bus Services of Stroud.

Also, in 1933, Red & White purchased All-British Travels Ltd, which had been formed in 1930 by coach operators George Taylor of Chester, Alfred Harding of Birkenhead and JW Scott of Edinburgh, with sleeping partner Evan R Davies, a solicitor in Pwllheli. In 1930, ABT had launched express coach services on two routes, Liverpool – Chester – London and Llandudno – Chester – London, under the fleet name of "All-British Line". The Chester stop was at Taylor's car showroom in Market Square, Chester. ABT opened a Central London travel agency to market those services and the other coach services of the respective companies.

When Red & White bought All-British Travels Ltd in January 1933, it included an option to purchase the final remaining All-British Line service between Liverpool and London which was operated by Taylor and which subsequently went ahead. George Taylor was paid £850 for the goodwill of the service and the All-British Line service between Liverpool and London ceased on 26 September 1933. Taylor continued in the coach excursion business and car trade in Chester up to 1972.

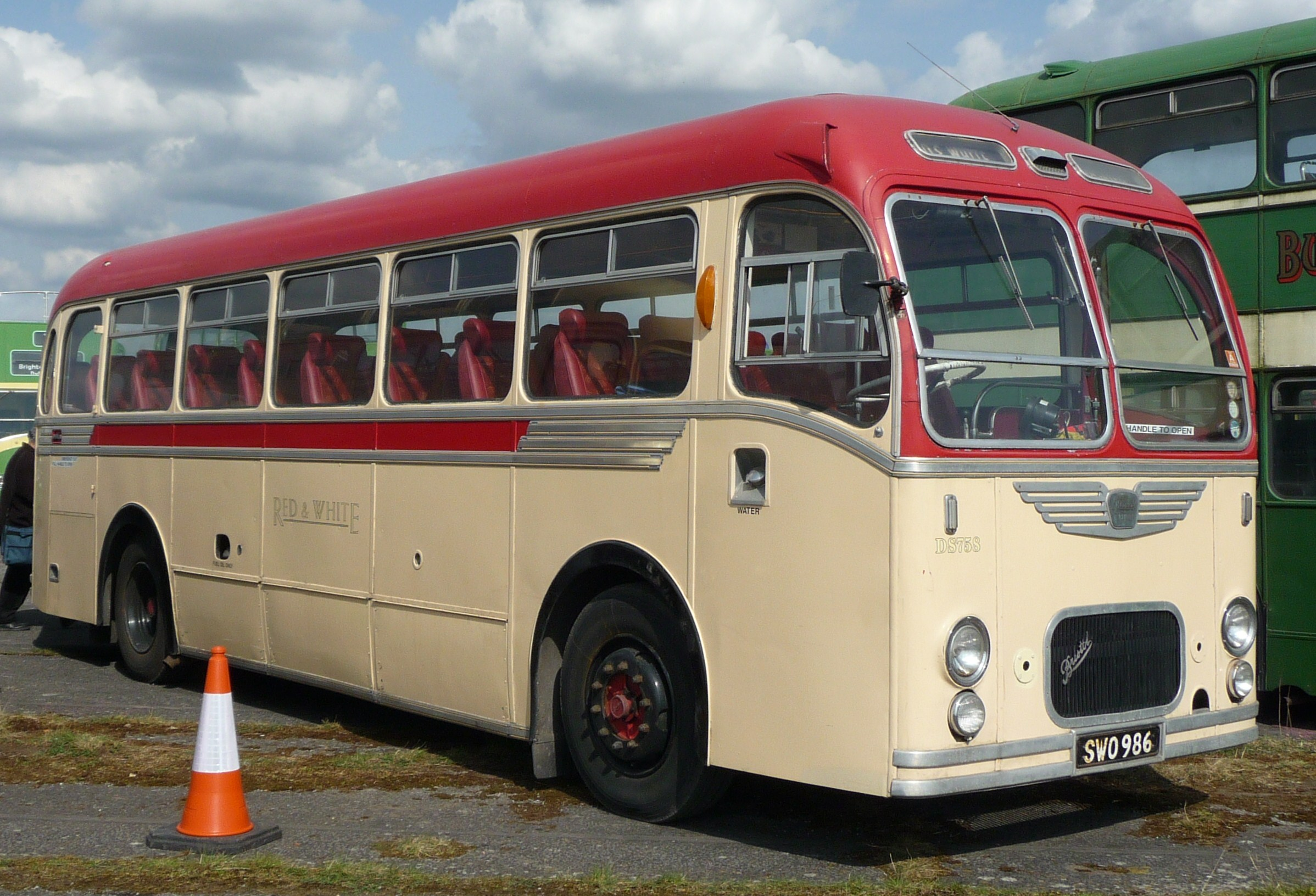
Preserved Red & White 1958 Bristol MW-6G coach with Eastern Coach Works body

By 1937, Red & White and its subsidiaries were operating a fleet of over 400 buses and coaches. In that year, Red & White United Transport Ltd was formed as a public company to hold the group's various interests. The group's operations in the Swansea area were brought together in 1939 in a new company, United Welsh Services Ltd. Later in 1939, the group bought Cheltenham District Traction Company, which ran town buses in Cheltenham.

Expansion continued during the Second World War. Early in 1944, the group bought Newbury & District, which ran buses in West Berkshire, and, in 1945, it bought Venture Ltd, the main bus operator in Basingstoke, Hampshire. Also, in 1945, it bought South Midland Motor Services of Oxford, which, before the war, had run express coach services between London, Oxford and Worcester.

== Nationalisation ==
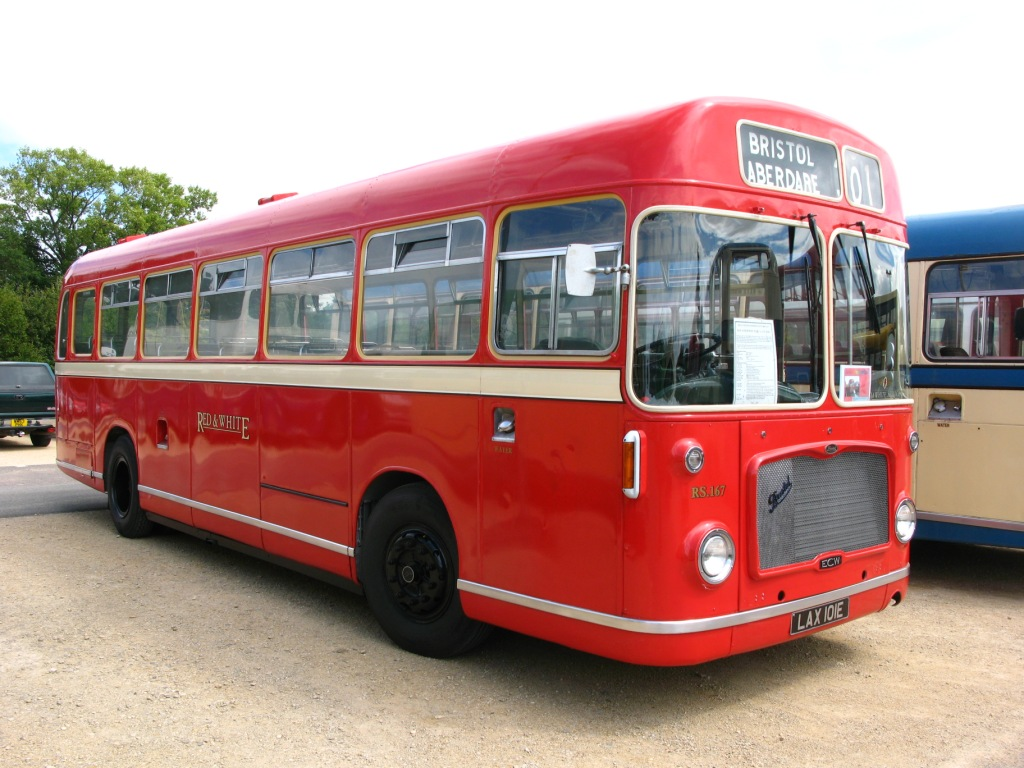
Preserved Red & White 1967 Bristol RESL-6L bus with Eastern Coach Works body

In 1950, to pre-empt compulsory acquisition by the 1950 Labour government, Red & White sold its UK bus and coach operations to the British Transport Commission. The group changed its name to United Transport Company, and continued to hold its interests in transport in Africa and in road freight transport in the UK. It was taken over by British Electric Traction in 1971.

The British Transport Commission transferred most of the English bus operations of Red & White to other recently nationalised companies:

- Venture Ltd was transferred to Wilts & Dorset
- Newbury & District was transferred to Thames Valley Traction
- The management of South Midland was also transferred to Thames Valley Traction
- The operations in the Stroud area were transferred to Bristol Tramways
- Cheltenham District Traction Company was also transferred to Bristol Tramways

In return, the Forest of Dean services of Bristol Tramways were transferred to Red & White.

This left Red & White with its services in Monmouthshire, the Forest of Dean and the Glamorgan valleys. United Welsh was managed separately within the BTC.

In 1962, Red & White was transferred to the state-owned Transport Holding Company, and in 1969 to the National Bus Company.

On 27 April 1978, the National Bus Company merged the operations of Red & White into the neighbouring NBC operator Western Welsh, which became National Welsh or Cymru Cenedlaethol. In the Market Analysis Project revisions in the early 1980s National Welsh's operations in Chepstow and the Wye Valley became rebranded as Wyedean. After a time, this was rebranded as Red & White, and the Red & White name returned to the Eastern parts of Wales.

== Privatisation ==
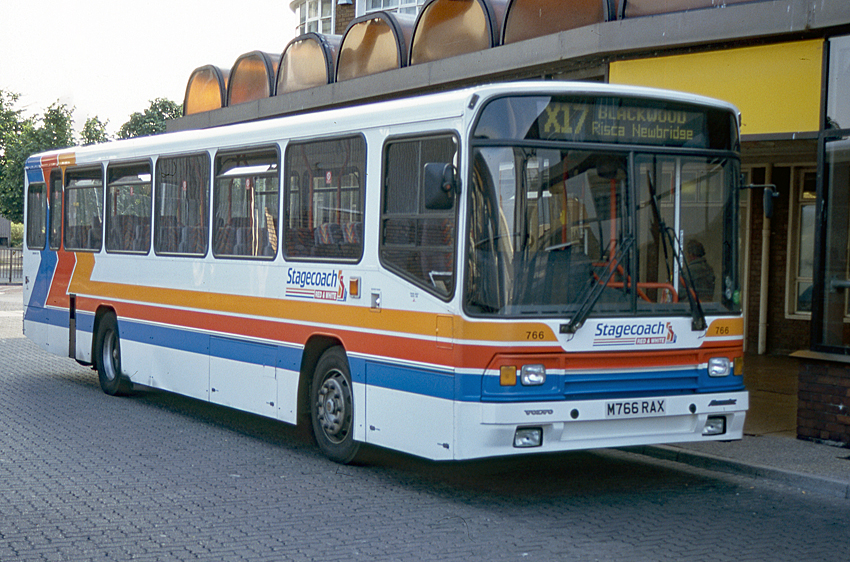
Stagecoach Red & White Alexander PS bodied Volvo B10M at Cardiff bus station in June 1996

National Welsh was privatised in 1988. The company struggled financially and went into receivership in 1992, the sole failure of a privatised National Bus Company subsidiary. National Welsh was broken up as a result, and National Welsh's Eastern division (operating services in the Glamorgan and Gwent valleys) being acquired by Stagecoach, while FirstGroup acquired the Bridgend operations. Other operations were initially contested by various companies, notably Rhondda Buses which itself was eventually taken over by Stagecoach.

Red and White branded buses, with their own (non-Stagecoach) livery, remained in service as late as 1993.

The brand name Stagecoach Red & White was used for a time for the initial acquisitions, but Stagecoach subsequently split the operations: the Welsh operations became part of Stagecoach South Wales, and the Forest of Dean operations became Stagecoach in Wye & Dean, part of Stagecoach West.

"Red & White Services Ltd" is still the legal name of Stagecoach South Wales.

== Surviving vehicles ==
About 18 former Red & White buses and coaches are known to survive. Most are either stored in "as withdrawn" condition or have been restored and are now considered preserved. As of August 2021, six of the restored vehicles were roadworthy, including a 1949 Guy Arab (registration mark HWO 342); 1958 Bristol MW (SWO 986), 1965 Bristol MW (DAX 610C), 1966 Bristol MW (JAX 117E), 1967 Bristol RESL (LAX 101E) and 1968 Bristol RELH (OAX 9F). Two others were being restored: a 1957 Bristol SC (registration mark ONV 425) and 1965 Bristol RELL (GAX 2C). A 1969 Bristol RELH coach (SAX 1G) is stored and has received some restoration work.
