= Bristol MW =

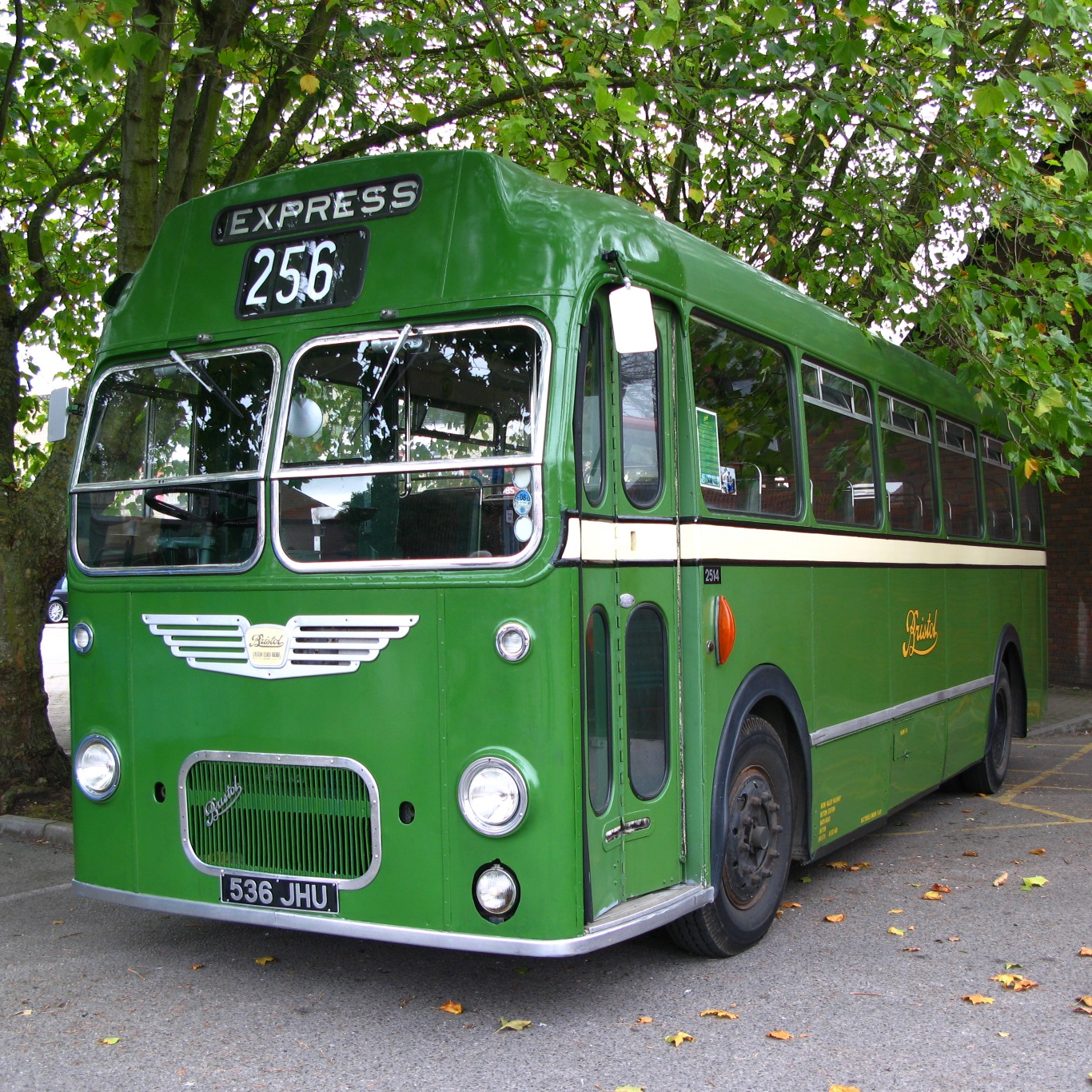
- A Bristol MW with Eastern Coach Works bodywork

Overview
- Manufacturer: Bristol Commercial Vehicles

Body and chassis
- Doors: 1
- Floor type: Step entrance

Powertrain
- Engine: Gardner

Dimensions
- Length: 30 ft (9.1 m)
- Width: 8 ft (2.4 m)

The Bristol MW (MW stands for "Medium Weight") is a bus and coach chassis. designed and built between 1956 and 1966 by Bristol Commercial Vehicles in Brislington, Bristol.

== Design and construction ==
It had a horizontally mounted engine under the floor between the two axles allowing an entrance ahead of the front axle and a flat floor for its entire length and thus suitable for "one-man" operation. The chassis then had a body mounted upon it by a bodybuilder, either a bus body or a coach body. The MW replaced the earlier LS (Light Saloon) which was designed to be built into an integral bus or coach only by sister company Eastern Coach Works (ECW) in Lowestoft. This prevented the sale of the mechanical underframe to other bodybuilders when a change in control of the company allowed this to happen. A few chassis were sent to Alexander at Falkirk to receive bodies to the specification of companies within the Scottish Bus Group.

Unlike the earlier LS, which experimentally housed AEC and Rootes TS3 engines and the later RE experimentally using a horizontal and turbocharged version of Bristol's own BVW engine, all MW chassis were fitted with Gardner 5HLW (5-cylinder) or 6HLW (6-cylinder) engines. The chassis type designation was either MW5G or MW6G. These engines were deep in their horizontal form causing the floor height of the finished vehicle to be high, resulting in steep steps at the entrance. The transmission was by way of a manual 5-forward speed gearbox made by the company. It incorporated synchromesh cones, but these did not wear well and gear changing still required drivers to adjust engine to road speed. The rear axle was available in three ratios 5:1, 5.5:1 and 6:1. 5.5:1 was by far the most popular and 6:1 was the standard for bus versions built for Bristol Omnibus Company

The vehicle was built to the contemporaneous legal maximum limits of size, namely 8 ft wide (2.4 m) and 30 ft long (9.1 m). When regulations allowed longer (36 ft or 11 m) and wider (8 ft 2 1/2 in or 2.5 m) vehicles, BCV did not extend this chassis and moved to a new concept with a rear engine. Despite this, as late as 1962, an option was designed to incorporate major modifications to the chassis to fit air springs instead of the traditional multi-leaf springs. The air sprung version was popular for chassis intended for coach bodywork, just before the 36 ft model for fitment to the RE chassis. Few customers specified air springs for bus versions. Bristol Omnibus Company was the main one and it was on the basis that the better suspension caused less stress and damage to the chassis and bodywork and reduced lifetime costs of operating the vehicles would outweigh higher initial purchase price. Their chief engineer at the time, Mr E Hardy, was sorely displeased when the option was withdrawn for the last year of production.

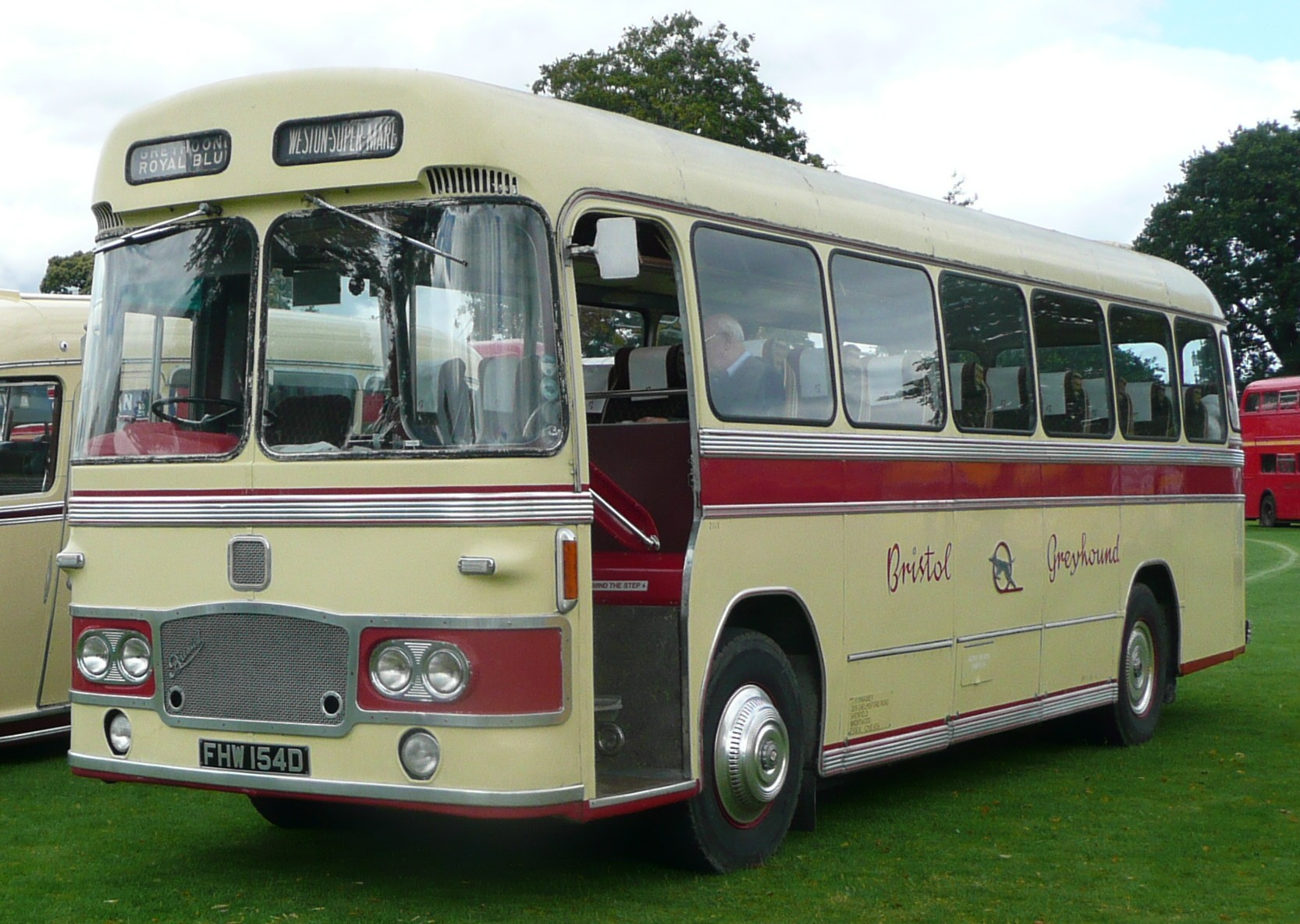
MW with Eastern Coach Works coach bodywork

There were some options for this chassis introduced later in production to improve fuel consumption and vehicle heating. This included the replacement of the underfloor radiator and its constantly engine driven fan by a front-mounted radiator with "Varivane" wax capsule operated radiator shutters backed up with a thermostatically controlled electric fan. The provision of an "exhaust-boiler" was also available. This had a temperature controlled valve which could divert the exhaust gas from the exhaust pipe through a heat exchanger incorporated into the engine cooling system, thus allowing quicker heating up to engine operating temperature and assisting passenger comfort in colder weather when the engine was not providing enough waste heat in the normal way.

Some chassis were fitted with an exhaust brake for some time, though many so-fitted had the equipment removed later.

A total of 1,965 Bristol MW chassis were built. Those with bodywork fitted by ECW were driven by road by a weather-swept crew of drivers. Rail transport was used for those going to Alexander.

== Sanctions ==
Production of chassis was authorised by the Board of Directors of BCV in tranches by type, known as "sanctions". Each vehicle received a cast number plate which was bolted to the chassis in the form "135.001" being the first vehicle of the 135 sanction. This number was not always the same as the "build number" allocated by production control and not used after the chassis left the factory.

The sanctions for MW chassis are summarised below. The details are taken from lists compiled from Bristol Commercial Vehicles records showing the customer, fleet number, registration mark for every chassis made and dates constructed and cross checked with individual fleet operators fleet lists.

- 135 – 150 vehicles built December 1956 – April 1958
- 139 – 300 vehicles built April 1958 – April 1959
- 152 – 200 vehicles built April 1959 – January 1960
- 164 – 200 vehicles built January 1960 – December 1960
- 184 – 250 vehicles built December 1960 – January 1962
- 195 – 200 vehicles built January 1962 – November 1962
- 204 – 100 vehicles built November 1962 – February 1963 (Air spring option fitted to chassis numbers 028-074, 079–083, 089–100)
- 213 – 250 vehicles built February 1963 –October 1964 (Air spring option fitted to chassis numbers 001, 013–031, 039–041, 048–053, 066–070, 111–118, 123–134, 141–142, 151–158, 163–166, 173–188, 193–196, 201–205, 208–210, 214–215, 222–229, 234–239, 241–243, 246–248)
- 225 – 150 vehicles built October 1964 – January? 1965 (At least chassis numbers 001-075 were built with leaf springs)
- 233 – 165 vehicles built 1966 to December 1966
