= British Electric Traction =

Former British industrial conglomerate

BET plc
- Type: Public
- Industry: Conglomerate
- Founded: 1895; 131 years ago
- Defunct: 1996; 30 years ago
- Fate: Acquired
- Successor: Rentokil Initial
- Headquarters: London, UK
- Products: Transport services Television services Laundry services

British Electric Traction Company Limited, renamed BET plc in 1985, was a large British industrial conglomerate. It was once a constituent of the FTSE 100 Index but was acquired by Rentokil in 1996, and the merged company is now known as Rentokil Initial.

== History ==
=== Early history ===
==== Tramway services ====
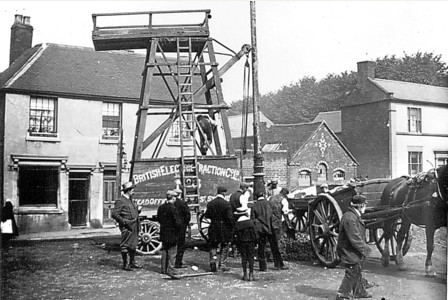
BET wagon used in the installation of overhead tram wires, at Sedgley, c. 1901

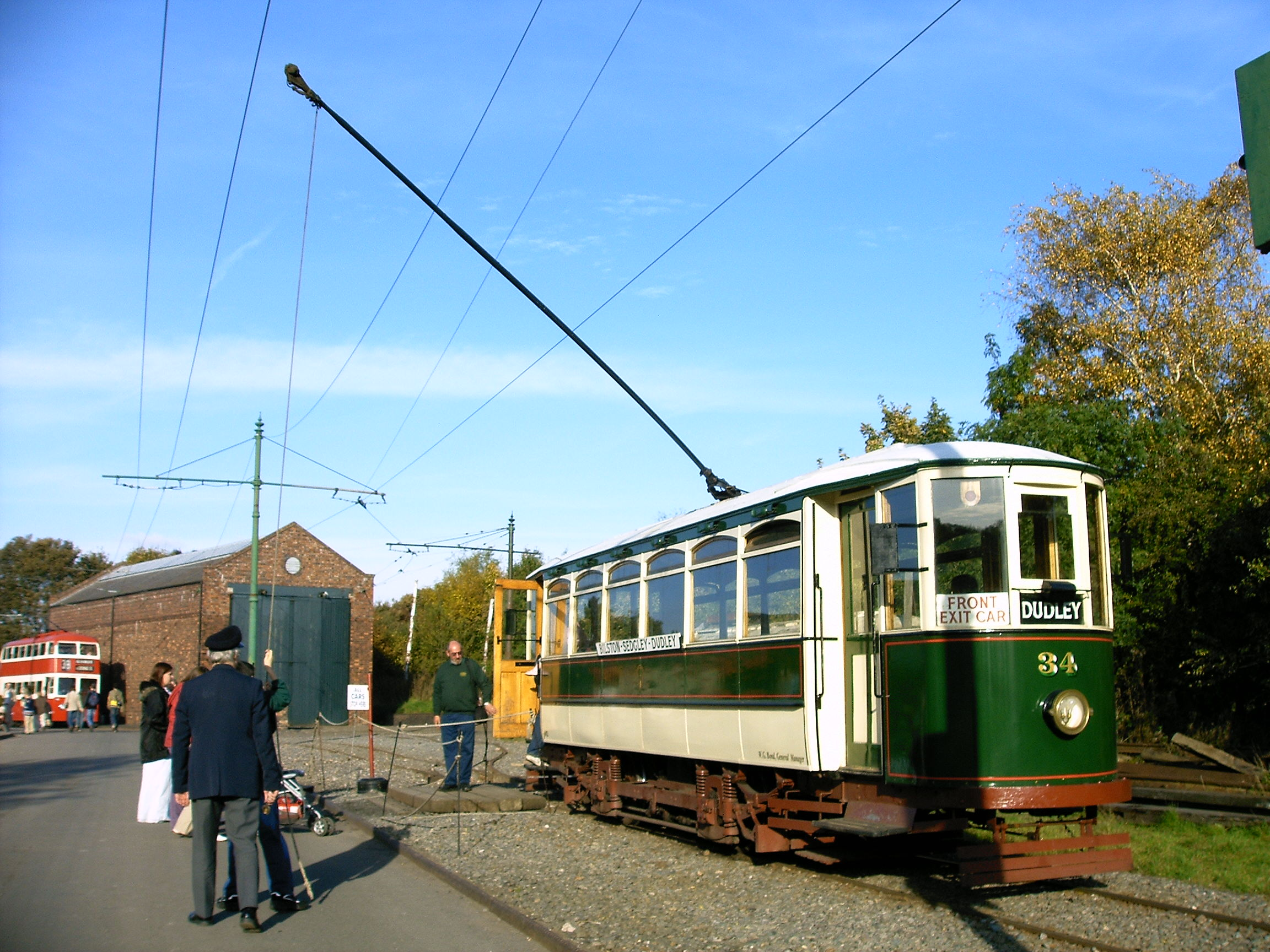
Wolverhampton District Electric Tramways Company preserved tramcar at the Black Country Museum

The company was founded in 1895 as British Electric Traction Company Ltd., with Sir Charles Rivers Wilson as chairman and Emile Garcke as managing director. It was involved in the electrification of tramways in British towns and cities, and also in Australia and New Zealand, for example in Auckland. From operating trams, BET moved on to manufacturing them with the purchase of Brush Electrical Engineering Company in 1901.

The BET became the largest of the private owners of tramways in the British Isles. During its history, it gained control in England of the Metropolitan Electric and South Metropolitan systems in London, as well as systems in Barnsley, Barrow-in-Furness, Birmingham, Birmingham and Midland, Brighton and Shoreham, Cambridge, Devonport and District, Dewsbury Ossett and Soothill Nether, Dudley and Stourbridge, Gateshead, Gravesend, Great Yarmouth, Hartlepool, Jarrow, Kidderminster and Stourport, Leamington and Warwick, Mexborough and Swinton, Middleton, Oldham Ashton and Hyde, Peterborough, Poole, the Potteries, Rossendale Valley, Sheerness, South Staffordshire, Southport, South Shields, Taunton, Tynemouth, Weston-Super-Mare, Wolverhampton District, Worcester, and Yorkshire (Woollen District).

In Wales

- Merthyr Tydfil Electric Tramways
- Swansea
- Swansea and Mumbles Railway
- Wrexham and District Electric Tramways

In Scotland

- Airdrie and Coatbridge Tramways
- Greenock and Port Glasgow
- Rothesay and Ettrick Bay Light Railway

In Northern Ireland

- Cavehill and Whitewell Tramway

The last BET tram ran on 4 August 1951, when the Gateshead and District Tramways Company replaced its trams with buses.

==== Motor bus services ====
In 1905 a subsidiary was formed to operate motor buses, which became increasingly important to the group as many municipalities were compulsorily acquiring company-owned tram networks in their areas.

=== Post war ===
Nationalisation of BET's electricity generation and distribution activities took place in 1947 leaving BET with a portfolio of bus companies, a number of miscellaneous investments, and a cash pile. The company embarked on a programme of acquisitions, with particular emphases on transport, leisure and entertainment, printing and publishing, construction and plant hire, textile maintenance and waste management.

== Products and operations ==
=== Transport ===
From 1949 until 1967 BET continued to be one of the two major bus groups in the UK, alongside the state-owned Tilling Group (owned by the British Transport Commission and from 1963 by the Transport Holding Company).

In 1956 BET acquired a 20% interest in United Transport Company, the rump of the old Red & White company, increased to 100% in 1971. United Transport continued with its freight road haulage business (Bulwark Transport), and also moved into shipping, particularly containers and tank containers.

The British Transport Commission (and later the Transport Holding Company) held minority interests in many of BET's UK bus subsidiaries, and in late 1967 BET sold its UK bus interests to the Transport Holding Company, to become part of the National Bus Company.

United Transport had passenger transport and freight interests in southern Africa. BET owned and operated Jamaica Omnibus Service, a 600-bus operation in Kingston, Jamaica, until it was nationalised by the Jamaican Government in 1974.

In January 1987 BET briefly reentered the UK bus market, when United Transport formed the Bee Line Buzz Company to operate minibus services in the Manchester area, and started a similar operation in Preston called Zippy. The company was headquartered in Didcot, South Oxfordshire. However, in 1988 United sold Bee Line and Zippy to Ribble Motor Services (coincidentally once owned by BET).

=== Leisure and entertainment ===
In 1947 BET acquired a substantial minority interest in Broadcast Relay Service Ltd, trading as Rediffusion, which distributed radio and television signals through wired relay networks. BET acquired a controlling interest in 1967, and the remaining 36% in 1983.

When ITV commercial television started in the UK in 1955, Rediffusion formed Associated-Rediffusion with Associated Newspapers with BET's financial backing, and won the London weekday broadcast franchise.

In the beginning, Associated Rediffusion lost money. By the end of 1956 Associated Newspapers sold 80% of its stake back to BET and Rediffusion at a severe loss. Around that same time, Associated Rediffusion struck a very favourable deal with Granada Television, the franchise holder for weekday broadcasts in the North of England. Granada was also losing money, and lacked the financial resources of BET; the deal guaranteed Granada a certain level of financial security, at the cost of Associated-Rediffusion receiving the vast majority of future profits from their arrangement.

By 1964, when Associated Rediffusion changed its name to Rediffusion London, its efforts had left it sitting on a mountain of cash. But in 1967 the Independent Television Authority ordered Rediffusion London to enter into a joint arrangement with ABC Weekend TV, the holder of the weekend Midlands and North of England franchises, to form Thames Television. As a result of this re-allocation of interests, ABC took a controlling 51% interest in Thames Television, although the profits were split 50/50 between ABC and Rediffusion. Thames Television was given the new weekday London franchise. BET sold its interest in Thames Television in 1985.

Between 1955 and 1968 BET made other acquisitions in the leisure sector, including a controlling interest in Wembley Stadium Ltd, which was sold in 1985.

=== Printing and publishing ===
BET acquired the Argus Press group in 1966.

=== Construction and plant hire ===
BET acquired Eddison Plant Ltd in 1949, and expanded into construction after the sale of its bus interests in 1968. It acquired Boulton & Paul Ltd and Grayston Ltd. Murphy Bros. Limited with interests in civil engineering, opencast coal mining, building materials production and plant hire was acquired in 1968. BET acquired Shifnal, Shropshire based Wrekin Construction Company Limited in 1972 and divested the business to its founder Tom Frain in 1983 for £3 million.

In 1985 BET acquired the crane company G W Sparrow & Sons plc, and combined its craneage interests into a new subsidiary, Grayston White and Sparrow.

=== Laundry and linen rental ===
BET entered the laundry business in 1934, and in 1935 acquired an interest in Advance Linen Services, which became a subsidiary in 1955.

In 1950 BET took a 10% interest in Initial. The stake was gradually increased until 1985, when BET took over Initial.

=== Waste management ===
In 1971 BET acquired Biffa, and also acquired Re-Chem International, which specialised in toxic industrial waste processing.

== Divestment and sale ==
In the 1980s, conglomerates such as BET fell out of favour, and BET extracted itself from some business sectors. Its interests in Thames Television were sold in 1985, and the rest of Rediffusion soon followed. BET sold its 75 per cent shareholding in Humphries Holdings to Lee International for £2.5 million in 1985. Rediffusion Simulation was sold in 1988 to Hughes Aircraft. In 1991 Biffa was sold to Severn Trent Water. BET also sold its construction interests.

BET retained the profitable laundry and linen rental businesses, and also the shipping businesses of United Transport.

In 1996 BET was acquired by the much smaller Rentokil, after a hostile take-over bid. The merged company was named Rentokil Initial.
