= Bus transport in Bromsgrove =

Bus transport in Bromsgrove has a long and varied history, dating back to Midland Red operations. In recent years, however, First Midland Red, which has evolved from the original Midland Red company, has severely reduced operations, leaving many independent operators running in the town.

== Current operators ==
=== First Midland Red ===
First operate a single service in the town, the 144/144A route which ran to Birmingham in one direction and Worcester in the other. Service 144A terminated at Catshill instead of Birmingham. First previously operated many other services in the town, but in March 2013, the First depots at Kidderminster and Redditch were purchased by Diamond Bus. As of 1st May 2022 the 144A Has been renamed to 144 and the 144 has been withdrawn cancelling out the Birmingham section but National Express now operate a 20 from Bromsgrove to QE Hospital With effect from 1 May 2022, all journeys on service 144 terminate at Catshill, no longer continuing into Birmingham. The company states that insufficient passengers are carried between Catshill and Birmingham to make the section viable. As of June 2025, the X20 service runs from Birmingham City Centre and Bromsgrove replacing the 20 route.

=== Diamond West Midlands ===
Diamond operate the 52 service from Kidderminster to Redditch via Bromsgrove and Charford, and the 52A from Bromsgrove to Redditch Bus Station (formerly from the Princess of Wales Hospital in Bromsgrove to the Alexandra Hospital in Redditch). Further expansion resulted from the acquisition of the Kidderminster and Redditch depots of First Midland Red.

Diamond additionally operates the 145/145A service between Rubery and Longbridge railway station to Droitwich Spa or Wychbold, via Bromsgrove and Barnt Green. Diamond announced that, from the 5th January 2025, the 145 would no longer serve Rubery, Droitwich and Wychbold, and the 145A would be withdrawn. Following County Council intervention, the planned changes have been cancelled while funding for the service is discussed.

==== Previous services ====
Diamond had previously operated the commercial 64 service to Birmingham from Bromsgrove and its replacement, service 144. Diamond also operated the 007 prior to Midland Rider taking it over. Diamond restarted operations on the 007, which has been renumbered to the 147 service, and taken over by Kev's Cars and Coaches.

=== National Express West Midlands ===
Travel West Midlands formerly operated the 145 route in the town, alongside a single journey on the 318 route. They last operated in the town on 28 June 2003.

Following renaming as National Express West Midlands, the operator returned services to the town, when they began operating new service 144A from Longbridge, partly replacing First Midland Red service 144. This service has now been renumbered X20 and extended to Birmingham City Centre having replaced the 20 service in June 2025.

=== MRD Travel ===
MRD operate a number of local services in the Bromsgrove area, mostly under contract to Worcestershire County Council. They have been operating since December 2003.

== Previous operators ==
=== Redline ===
Redline were a small local operator registered in School Lane, Lickey End, Bromsgrove. They operated local services 33, 92, 95, 96, 97, 98, 318, 319 and S23. A previous incarnation of the company had previously operated in Redditch on the 57 and 58 services, though the partnership broke up in 1989.

== Current routes ==
Number	From	To	Via	Current Operator	Image
39B	Bromsgrove	Longbridge	Catshill, Barnt Green, Alvechurch	WMSNT	
39B	The 39B route was launched in September 2012 to link the town to Bournville College in Longbridge. Service has since been withdrawn.				
90	Bromsgrove	Catshill		MRD Travel	
90	The current incarnation of the 90 route is operated by MRD Travel. It is an infrequent service, interworked with services 91 and 322. The service started on 10 February 2004 replacing the previous Clearway 94 service. Extra journeys were added on 5 September 2005.				
91	Catshill	Lickey End		MRD Travel	
91	The history of this service dates back to when it was a short working of the 90/91 Bromsgrove - Catshill circulars, and it has also been numbered as a short working of the 143. The current route is a school service, for Catshill Middle School, with one journey in each direction on school days. It was registered as a stand-alone service by First on 4 September 2003, to be later withdrawn on 12 June 2005.				
93	Bromsgrove	Charford		Clearway, MRD Travel	
93	This route was operated by First Midland Red until end of service on 1 September 2008 when First de-registered the route; two days later it was taken over by Clearway of Catshill. It was originally operated to the same timetable, but from 31 August 2008 most off peak journeys were withdrawn. MRD Travel now run a handful of journeys on the route.				
97 98	Bromsgrove	Sidemoor / Foxwalks		Cofton Coaches	
97 98	These routes were taken over from Rover Coaches by Redline on 3 September 1990, though Rover Coaches continued to operate in competition. Originally a Monday - Friday only service, this was extended to Saturdays on 3 November 1990. Operation continued by Redline until the company ceased trading in 1998, when the routes were taken over by First Midland Red. Four years later Pete's Travel won the contract to operate the services on 3 November 2002, only to de-register them on 4 September 2003 when they were once again taken over by First Midland Red. Less than a year later, on 18 April 2004, the services once again changed hands, and they were then operated by Cofton Coaches. These services have now been withdrawn.				
99	Bromsgrove	Charford		Clearway	
99	When first registered, the 99 route was Catshill - Bromsgrove - Charford, though it was later curtailed to run Bromsgrove - Charford only. Currently operated by Clearway in addition to the 93 service.				
141	Bromsgrove	Droitwich	Stoke Prior, Wychbold	Diamond West Midlands	
141	This route was operated by Midland Red West until 31 August 1996 when the contract was lost to the Little Red Bus Company. An evening service was not included in this contract and so it was withdrawn from that date. Operation of the service returned to Midland Red West some years later. On 18 April 2004, service 140 was withdrawn and the 141 was reduced to operate at peak times only; off peak services were replaced by a new 940 service, which is pre-bookable by telephone. The 140 variant of this service was withdrawn on 14 April 2013. From 12 April 2009, Diamond Bus won the contract to operate this service once again as routes 140 and 141, replacing First. This service no longer runs.				
142 143	Marlbrook Princess of Wales Hospital	Redditch	Tardebigge, Aston Fields, Bromsgrove	Diamond West Midlands	
142 143	The first incarnation of the 143 route ran from Birmingham - Bromsgrove - Charford, eventually being changed to run Birmingham - Bromsgrove - Redditch - Alexandra Hospital, though the hospital extension was withdrawn in the late 1990s. 18 April 2004 saw the first of many changes to the route, it being re-routed in the Catshill area to replace the withdrawn 94 service. A year later on 12 June 2005 the 143 route was cut back to run Catshill - Bromsgrove - Redditch only, with its frequency halved. 4 September 2005 saw the route further cut back to run Bromsgrove - Redditch; an increase in the frequency of the 144 route made the Bromsgrove - Catshill section redundant. Hardings Coaches and Johnsons Coaches took over several journeys throughout 2006 and 2007 - the first operation on the route by an operator other than First Midland Red in the route's history. On 8 June 2008 several journeys were re-routed in the Bromsgrove area to serve the Charford estate. Diamond Bus won the contract to operate several journeys on 31 August 2008, replacing Hardings Coaches and Johnsons Coaches on the route. From 5 January 2009 many journeys were once again extended to Birmingham, though now operating via Lickey End, rather than Catshill. This is in competition with Diamond Bus, who shortly after dropped their fares to match those of First. In March 2013, First's Redditch operation (which runs this service) was sold to Diamond Bus who have continued operation on this route. However the service, now numbered 43, has since been cut to operate between Redditch and Bromsgrove only.				
144/144A	Birmingham	Worcester	Rubery, Marlbrook, Catshill, Bromsgrove, Droitwich	First	
144/144A	Main article: Worcestershire bus route 144 Services on the 144 corridor running between Droitwich and Great Malvern go back to 1913, eventually being extended to Birmingham in 1914. At that time the route was numbered 25, and later 125. The 144 number came into use on 11 February 1928. The Malvern - Worcester section was withdrawn in 1976. Diamond Bus had a brief stint operating part of the route in competition with First. First later cut the number of through journeys from 4 to 2, numbering the short workings between Worcester and Catshill 144A. All journeys terminated at Catshill from 1 May 2022 and were renumbered 144.				
20	Droitwich	Queen Elizabeth Hospital	Catshill, Rubery, Northfield, Queen Elizabeth Hospital	National Express West Midlands	
20	The 20 was introduced as the 144A by National Express West Midlands on 3 May 2022 as a part replacement for the withdrawn section of First Midland Red's 144 as far as Longbridge. It was renumbered 20 and extended to the Queen Elizabeth Hospital in 2023 and now runs hourly Mon-Sat, two hourly on Sundays.				
145, 145A	Droitwich	Longbridge	Bromsgrove, Lickey End, Burcot, Barnt Green	Diamond West Midlands	
145, 145A	The 145 is operated by Diamond West Midlands. In the past it has been operated by Travel West Midlands and First Midland Red. The full route used to run from Birmingham to Bromsgrove via the Pershore road, however it was curtailed to Cotteridge when taken over by Zak's Buses in 2003 (later Central Connect and Diamond Bus). First Midland Red took over the route in September 2011 when it was revised to run between Bromsgrove and Longbridge only. In March 2013, First's Redditch operation (which ran this service) was sold to Diamond Bus who have continued operation on this route. It has since been extended to serve Droitwich in competition with First's service 144/144A.				
147	Catshill	Halesowen	Romsley	Kev's Cars and Coaches	
147	The 147 was introduced from 1 September 2014 as a replacement for the 007 route which had been withdrawn by Diamond Bus. It was an extension of the 144A route, following the same line of route as the 144A between Worcester and Catshill and the same route as the 007 between Catshill and Halesowen. It provided an increased frequency of one bus per hour, compared to the 007's frequency of one bus per 90 minutes. The 147 service was cancelled by its operator, First, effective from 10 April 2016. A replacement service operated by Woosh, the bus division of Worcestershire County Council, commenced on 11 April 2016, operating between Catshill and Halesowen only, at a reduced frequency of approximately 2 hours. This was in response to a petition from residents of the village of Romsley, whose only bus service is the 147. They claimed that the service provided essential access to the nearby town of Halesowen, with the steep hill out of Halesowen making walking unsuitable, particularly for elderly residents. It is now operated by Kev's Cars.				
182 183	Lickey Bromsgrove	Redditch	Barnt Green, Alvechurch	Diamond	
182 183	Each service operates once a day in each direction.				
202	Bromsgrove	Halesowen	Marlbrook, Lickey, Rubery	Diamond West Midlands	
202	The 202/204 originally operated by Stevensons was transferred to Ludlows in 1992 and runs an hourly frequency. Briefly in the late 1990s this route was extended to run to Merry Hill; however this was short-lived and within a year the route was curtailed to run between Halesowen and Bromsgrove once again. It is now operated by Diamond Bus and was renumbered and rerouted as service 44 for a time before reverting to the original route and service number.				
322	Bromsgrove	Catshill	Dodford, Bournheath, Fairfield	MRD Travel	
322	Clearway originally operated the 322 route between Bromsgrove and Fairfield once a week; however it was withdrawn on 24 December 2003, to be taken over by MRD Travel on 30 December 2003. It has since been extended to Catshill and interworked with service 90.				
X7	Bromsgrove	Merry Hill shopping centre	Fairfield	MRD Travel	
X7	MRD introduced this service as a 1 journey each direction running between Bromsgrove and the Merry Hill centre. This service ran Tuesday and Thursdays but has now been withdrawn.				
X3	Redditch	Areley Kings	Bromsgrove, Kidderminster	Diamond West Midlands	
X3	The X3 originally started life as the X33. It first ran from 3 September 2000 as part of a scheme to connect the 3 main hospitals in Worcestershire. After several years the contract was taken over by Pete's Travel, however the contract was terminated early on 4 September 2003 as the parent company, Lionspeed entered administration and reverted to operations by First. This service is now numbered 42 & 42A but still operated by Diamond West Midlands.				
318	Stourbridge	Belbroughton	Bromsgrove	Kev's Cars and Coaches	
318	Service 318 was operated for many years by Midland Red and its successor Midland Red West. It was later operated by West Midlands Travel, Diamond West Midlands, Hanson's and WMSNT. It is now operated by Kev's Cars and Buses.				

A number of changes were made to services from August 29, 2021, which saw services 42 and 42A renumbered 52 and 52A. Service 52 runs hourly Mon-Sat, less frequently on Sundays running between Redditch and Kidderminster Bus Station via Bromsgrove and Charford. Service 52A runs hourly daily connecting Bromsgrove Bus Station to Redditch Bus Station.

== Former routes ==
=== 007 Bromsgrove - Halesowen ===
The 007 route was registered by Ludlows 26 January 1987, at the time only running between Halesowen and the village of Romsley. Seven years later on 31 January 1994 the route was massively extended at both ends to run between Merry Hill and Redditch Alexandra Hospital, via Halesowen, Romsley, Catshill, Bromsgrove and Redditch Town Centre. On 7 January 1997 the section of the route between Redditch town centre and Alexandra Hospital was withdrawn.

Following the purchase of Ludlows, the route passed into the hands of Diamond West Midlands. The route sparked local controversy in July 2010 when it was withdrawn, however it was quickly replaced by a new operator (Midland Rider) on a reduced timetable. From 11 January 2010 the service was extended to the Oakalls estate in Bromsgrove. and from August 2010, Diamond restarted operations on the 007 after Choice Travel/Midland Rider lost the contract.

The 007 ceased operation on 30 August 2014 and was replaced from 1 September 2014 by the new 147 route operated by First.

=== 64 Bromsgrove - Birmingham ===
When First Midland Red rerouted the 144 route to serve Catshill instead of Lickey End in 2004, Diamond bus registered service 64 between Bromsgrove and Birmingham running along the old 144 route. From 12 April 2009, the 64 service was withdrawn and replaced by similar journeys on the 144, following the route of the First Midland Red service through Catshill.

=== 92 Bromsgrove - Catshill ===
The 92 started life in the 90s as a route run by Redline in competition with First on the same corridor, however was withdrawn when Redine ceased trading in 1998. The number was reused in 1999 by local operator Clearway to operate a similar service using a different route, however this ceased on 6 February 2004 as it was no longer commercially viable and the council would not provide subsidy. A less frequent replacement service, 91 was in place the following day.

=== 94 Bromsgrove - Catshill ===
The 94 route used to be a minibus town service operated by First Midland Red until 18 April 2004 when it was withdrawn and replaced by a re-routed 143 and 144 service,. The revised routes only covered a small fraction of the village which caused over 500 people to sign a petition calling for the route to be reinstated.
