= 144 =

144 may refer to:

- 144 (number), the natural number following 143 and preceding 145
- AD 144, a year of the Julian calendar, in the second century AD
- 144 BC, a year of the pre-Julian Roman calendar
- 144 (film), a 2015 Indian comedy
- 144 (video game), working title of The Path, a psychological horror art game
- 144 (New Jersey bus), a bus route in New Jersey, USA
- Volvo 144, the main 4-door sedan model of the Volvo 140 Series
- Worcestershire bus route 144
- 144 Vibilia, a main-belt asteroid

== See also ==
- List of highways numbered 144
