= Charford =

Village in Worcestershire, England

Coordinates: 52.325107°N 2.066863°W

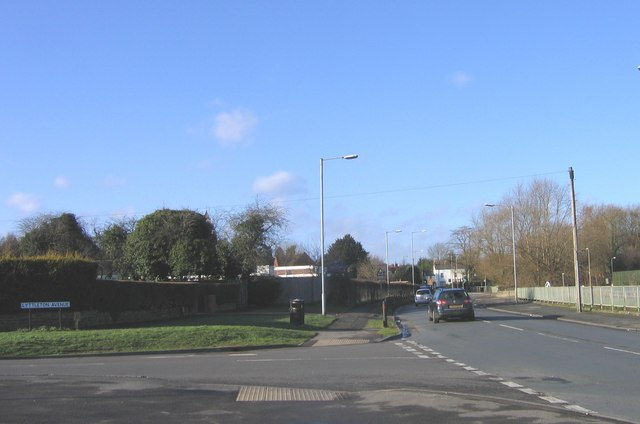
- The road junction between Lyttleton Avenue and Charford Road in the village.

- Location within Worcestershire
- District: Bromsgrove
- Shire county: Worcestershire
- Region: West Midlands
- Country: England
- Sovereign state: United Kingdom
- Post town: BROMSGROVE
- Postcode district: B60
- Dialling code: 01527
- UK Parliament: Bromsgrove

Charford is a small village located close to the town centre of Bromsgrove in Worcestershire, England.

== History ==
Charford used to be farm land with a mill, Charford Mill (known as The Lint Mill) provided employment by the manufacture of sanitary towels and wound dressings but was worn out for many years until it was demolished to make way for South Bromsgrove High School which retained the old mill pond at the front of the complex. This, however, has since been filled in due to the demolition and redevelopment of the school on an adjacent field though the sluice gate can still be seen to the side of the Sugarbrook that runs along the front of the school off Charford Road.

The original housing estates of Charford were built for workers of the Garringtons Drop forging plant in nearby Aston Fields that provided forgings for the automotive and aerospace industries.

== Transport ==
Bus services in Charford are provided by First Midland Red, Diamond West Midlands, Clearway and MRD Travel. There are routes to Bromsgrove, Droitwich, Worcester, Birmingham and Redditch. Bromsgrove railway station is situated in the adjacent village of Aston Fields with train services to Birmingham, Worcester and Hereford

== Education ==
Charford has two schools; Charford First School and South Bromsgrove High School, the latter having been recently rebuilt on the original playing fields as a brand new modern complex. The old buildings were demolished by DSM Demolition and the land is now a car park for staff and visitors.
