= Worcestershire bus route 144 =

Bus route in Worcestershire, England

144
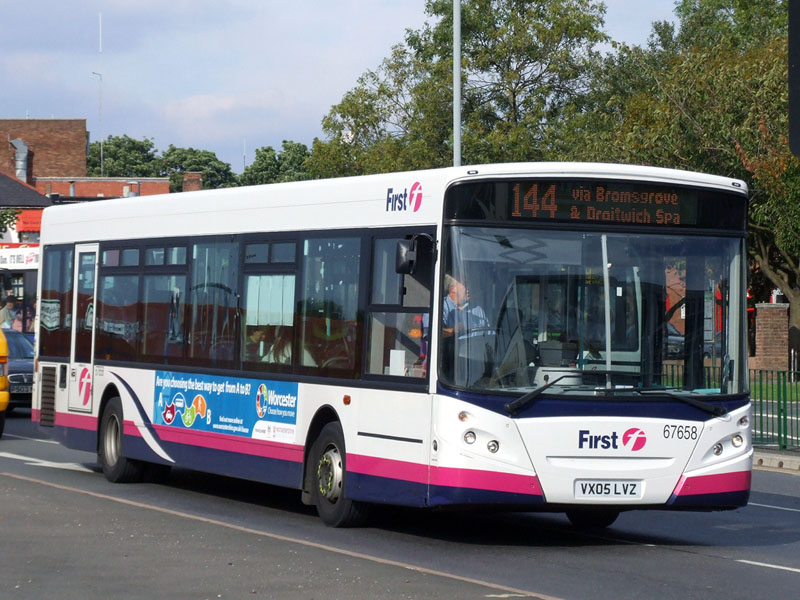

Overview
- Operator: First Worcestershire
- Predecessors: Diamond West Midlands

Route
- Start: Worcester, England
- Via: Droitwich and Bromsgrove
- End: Catshill

Worcestershire bus route 144 is a bus service connecting the Worcestershire areas of Catshill, Bromsgrove. Droitwich and Worcester, operated by First Worcestershire. The service dates back to 1914 and was one of the longest-running double-deck bus operated routes. The service now utilises a mixed-deck allocation of Alexander Dennis Enviro 300s and Enviro 400s.

The original routing of the 144 was from Birmingham to Malvern via Bromsgrove and Worcester, though the Worcester to Malvern section now forms part of the 44 route, the Bromsgrove to Longbridge section replaced by the 144A service by National Express West Midlands and the Longbridge to Birmingham section being withdrawn in 2022. Service 144A was replaced by service 20 in the autumn of 2023 providing an hourly link between Bromsgrove and the University Hospital in Birmingham.

== History ==
A bus service between Birmingham and Great Malvern was first introduced by Midland Red in August 1914, and was extended to Malvern Wells two years later. It was originally numbered 25, then 125. The number 144 was used from 1928.

On 24 March 2004, the service was re-routed in the Bromsgrove area to serve Catshill instead of the Birmingham Road, replacing the local bus number 90 on that section of the route. This change was fought by local residents who wanted to keep the route as it was. A year later in June 2005, Diamond Bus introduced a 64 service along the Birmingham Road, replacing the affected section.

Brand new Alexander Dennis Enviro300 low-floor buses were introduced as part of a relaunch of the route in June 2005. Thirteen vehicles, costing £1.5 million, entered service operating from both Worcester and Kidderminster depots due to staff shortage at the 144's native Worcester depot, by September all vehicles had returned to operate from the Worcester depot.

In May 2013, the short Worcester - Catshill journeys in the daytime were renumbered as 144A and operate via Webbs of Wychbold, a short deviation off the main 144 route.

In August 2014, 1 journey every hour between Bromsgrove and Catshill was extended to Halesowen, with that journey being renumbered 147., however this service was reverted to a 144A service in April 2016, with Worcestershire County Council taking on operation of a reduced service 147 between Halesowen and Catshill, and then Kev's Coach and Bus taking on operation in 2018, re-extending the service to Bromsgrove.

In 2018, the route was rebranded as Salt Road, acknowledging the salt trade in Droitwich.

From 1 May 2022, the service was revised to terminate at Catshill and no longer continue to Birmingham, with the Bromsgrove to Longbridge section replaced by the 144A (now 20) service by National Express West Midlands and the Longbridge to Birmingham section being withdrawn in 2022.

== Competition ==
On 12 April 2009, Diamond Bus started operations on the route, only running between Birmingham and Bromsgrove, replacing the 64 service, which they had previously operated on a similar route. Actual operations did not begin until the next day because the start date was a bank holiday; this was reduced to only run between Bromsgrove and Rubery in January 2010 (and being renumbered 144E), with positioning journeys to Droitwich, before being withdrawn completely on 4 April 2010.

Services 145/145A were extended from Bromsgrove to Droitwich, as a replacement to the 140/141 Worcestershire County Council tendered service, running on an alternative routing to the 144 via the village of Stoke Prior. These services terminate alternately at Droitwich or Webbs of Wychbold.

== Notable events ==
=== 2007 Worcestershire flooding ===
Regular 144 driver Josie Millward received recognition in the form of a First Superstar award in July 2007 for her actions during the severe flooding in Worcestershire in 2007. Upon reaching an impassable road she made her mobile phone available to passengers to contact friends and relatives to inform them that they would be delayed, even adding extra credit to the phone when it ran low. Other drivers on the route also received praise for their actions during the floods.

== See also ==
- Bus transport in Bromsgrove
- Transport in Birmingham
