= Birmingham Coach Station =

Coach interchange in Birmingham, England

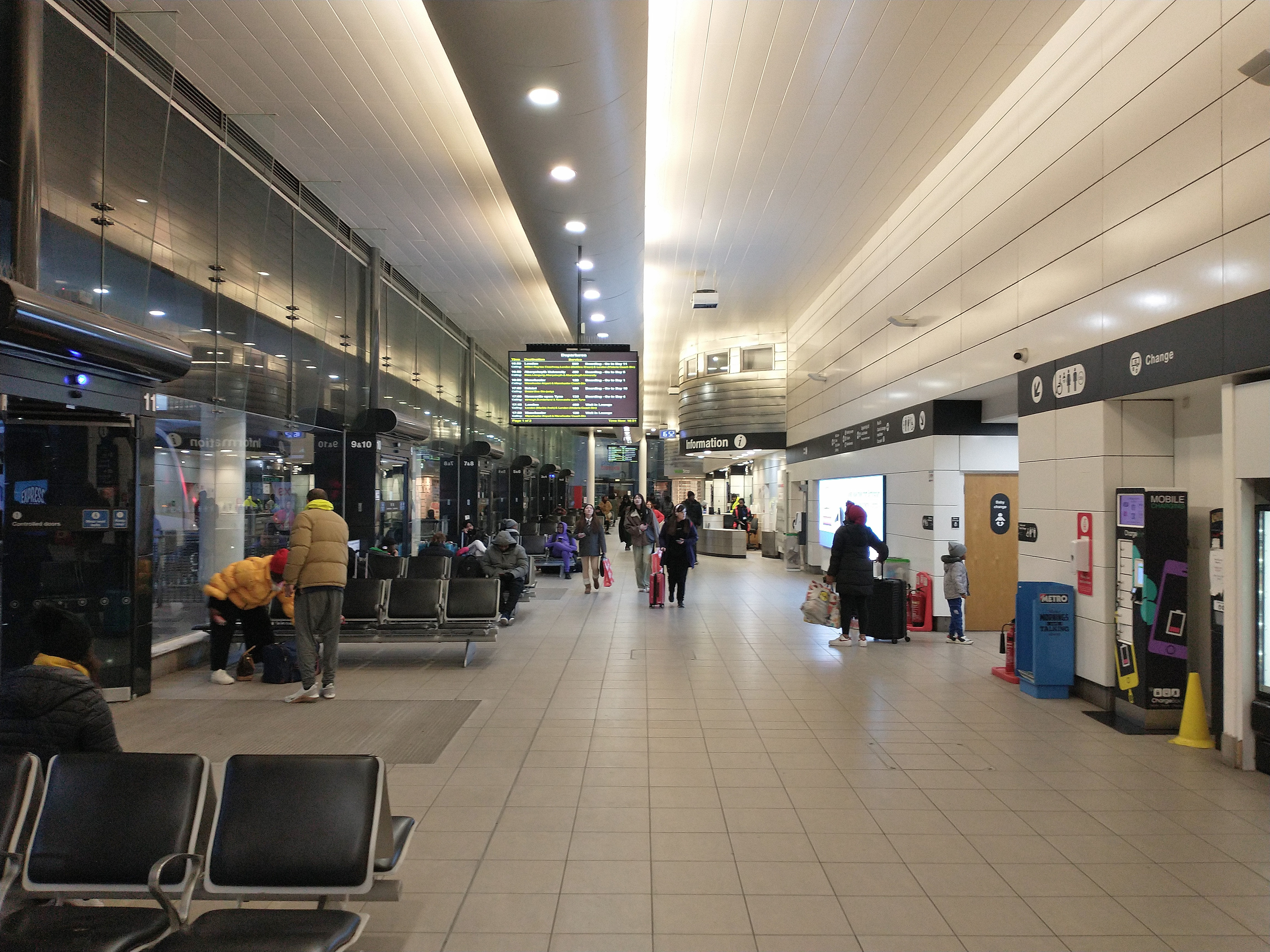
- Interior of the station

General information
- Other names: Digbeth Coach Station
- Location: Digbeth, Birmingham, England
- Coordinates: 52.47524°N 1.8886°W
- System: Coach interchange
- Bus stands: 16
- Bus operators: National Express

History
- Opened: 1929
Location

Birmingham Coach Station (formerly Digbeth Coach Station) is a major coach interchange in Digbeth, Birmingham, England offering services to destinations throughout the island of Great Britain and also to Belfast and Dublin. National Express, the largest scheduled coach service provider in Europe, has its national headquarters on the site.

== History ==
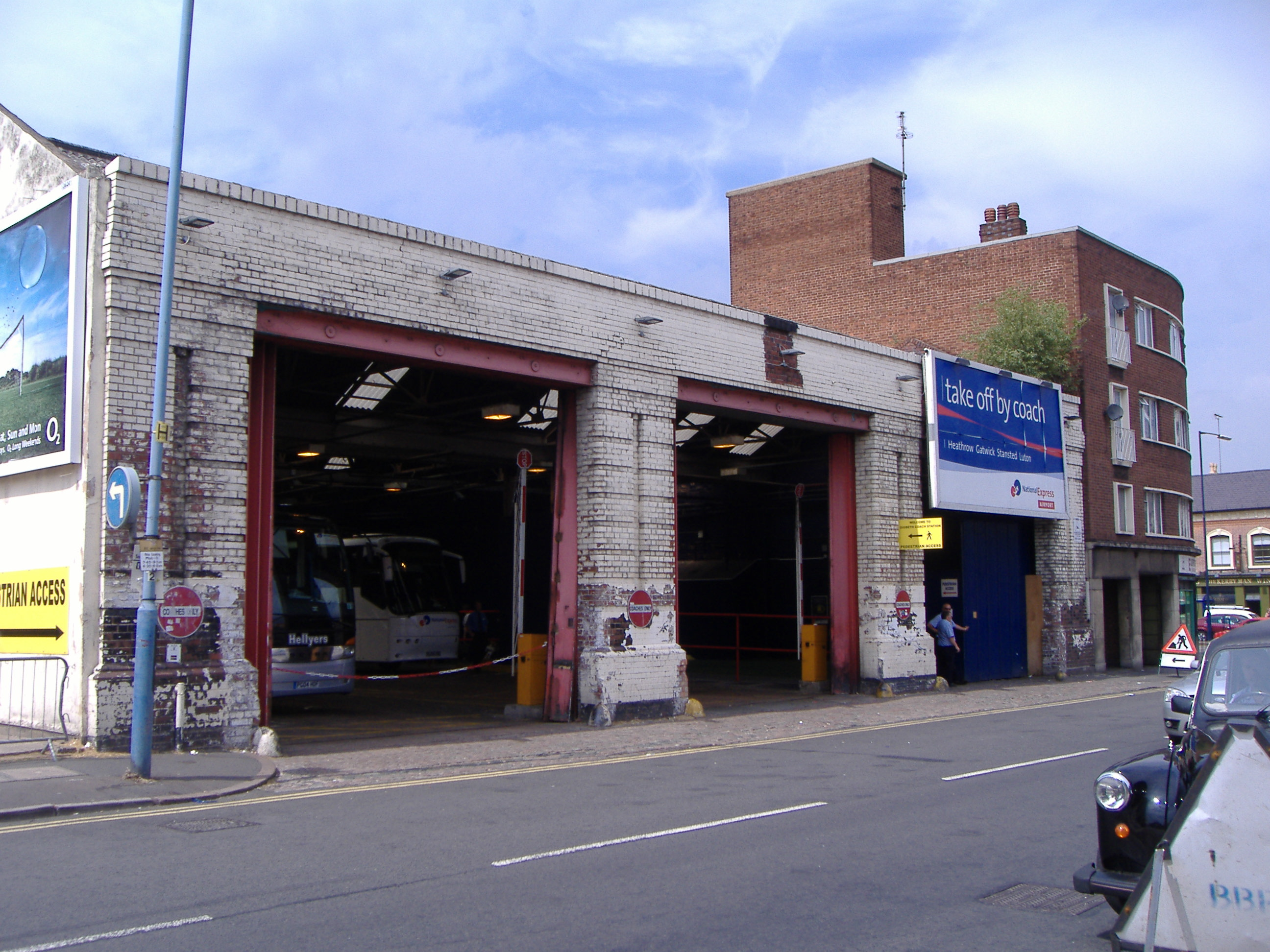
The vehicle entrance of the original Digbeth Coach Station, built in 1929 as a bus depot

The original interchange was built in 1929 as a bus depot by Midland Red, which was later converted into Digbeth Coach Station. Successor company Midland Red West used the coach station as a base for its Birmingham and Black Country operations. The original building was dark and dingy as it was not originally intended to serve passengers as a coach interchange.

Plans were initially developed for a new coach station on Great Charles Street, as Digbeth was considered by National Express to be an "undesirable" location. However, after the completion of the new Bullring and the planned Eastside redevelopment, it was decided to demolish the old structure and build a new coach station on the same site. Outline planning application for a design by Make Architects was submitted on behalf of National Express to Birmingham City Council in March 2006. However this option was abandoned in favour of a competing design by SBS Architects. The final planning application for the design by SBS Architects was submitted on 29 October 2007.

The old coach station closed in November 2007 for redevelopment and during reconstruction National Express used a temporary site in Oxford Street on the opposite side of Digbeth High Street, called Birmingham Central Coach Station. The refurbishment was estimated to have cost £15 million. It was officially reopened on 18 December 2009 by the then England national football team manager Fabio Capello. The new station has been awarded a BREEAM 'Excellent' rating.
