= Marlbrook, Worcestershire =

Village in Worcestershire, England

Coordinates: 52.363384°N 2.040927°W

Marlbrook
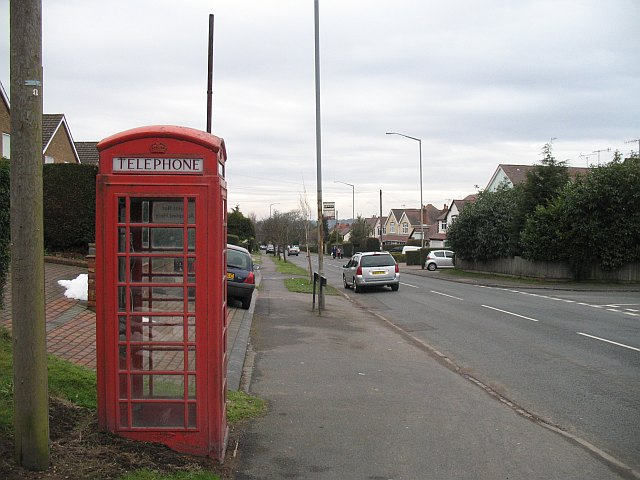
- Telephone box, Upper Marlbrook

- Location within Worcestershire
- OS grid reference: SO973739
- Civil parish: Catshill and North Marlbrook Lickey and Blackwell Lickey End
- District: Bromsgrove
- Shire county: Worcestershire
- Region: West Midlands
- Country: England
- Sovereign state: United Kingdom
- Post town: BROMSGROVE
- Postcode district: B61
- Dialling code: 0121
- Police: West Mercia
- Fire: Hereford and Worcester
- Ambulance: West Midlands
- UK Parliament: Bromsgrove

Marlbrook is a village in Worcestershire, England.

It is located 3 miles (5 km) north-east of Bromsgrove, between Upper Catshill from which it is separated by the A38 road, and Lickey Hills.

== History ==
Herbert Austin, founder of the Austin motor company, lived in Marlbrook at Grange Park, on what is now Lord Austin Drive.
