= Probus Management =

Former English bus company

- Founded: 4 May 1993
- Headquarters: West Bromwich
- Locale: West Midlands
- Service type: Bus services
- Fleet: 115 (March 2006)

This company originally traded as Pete's Travel, and has also traded as People's Express

Probus Management was a bus company in the West Midlands which was acquired by the Go-Ahead Group in March 2006.

== History ==
Probus Management commenced operating on 4 May 1993 trading as Pete's Travel with two Dodge minibuses on route 404 between Walsall and West Bromwich.

The operation of route 79, between Birmingham, West Bromwich and Wolverhampton, increased the size of the fleet to six by the end of the year. All the vehicles were painted in a white livery with a black skirt, and red fleet names. ^{Pictured}

=== Purchase of Lionspeed and gain of Centro contracts ===
In May 1994, Pete's acquired Lionspeed, who was a minibus operator based in Erdington, running a mix of commercial and Centro supported services in north Birmingham.

The company successfully gained the right to run its own Centro contracts in October 1994, and by February 1995 it had 25 minibuses in operation, mostly second-hand Dodge minibuses.

Pete's moved to a new depot in Church Lane Industrial Estate in May 1996, where 50 minibuses could be parked under cover. At the same time Lionspeed's yellow and green livery was adopted, and the company bought its first new buses in the shape of Mercedes-Benz minibuses, which were operated under a separate company called The Busy Bus Company.

In October 1996, the company won more Centro contracts and additional vehicles were needed. Pete's wanted six Mercedes-Benz Varios but could not obtain enough in time, so other bus types were operated, including a Dennis Dart SLF. The popularity of these buses led to Pete's purchasing another three in June 1997.

Pete's Travel took over further Centro contracts, with Dodge minibuses, in January 1997, after The Little Red Bus Company went into receivership.

=== Purchase of People's Express ===
In May 1997, the company acquired a 50% stake in People's Express, who at the time operated 13 buses, also in West Bromwich. The remainder of People's Express was purchased in June 1998, along with the company's Centro contracts. Following more contract wins at the end of 1998, the company expanded into Coventry, Telford and Bridgnorth.

=== Move to Hill Top and Redditch ===
A new depot was purchased in February of that year, at "Hill Top" in West Bromwich, allowing the use of double deckers for Centro school contracts.

In October 2001, two new depots were established, one in Coventry for newly won Centro and Warwickshire County Council contracts, and another in Redditch for Centro and Worcestershire County Council contracts, and some commercial services following First Wyvern's staff shortage service cuts.

=== Rise and decline of the Telford operations ===
In February 2002, the Britannia Travel of Telford business was purchased, which was used to expand operations in Shropshire and to start a coach operation. The Telford depot was closed in late 2004 due to the extensive loss of Shropshire contracts.

== People's Express name revived ==
On 28 March 2005, the company changed its trading name from Pete's Travel to People's Express. On 17 June 2005, People's Express closed the Redditch depot. From that date all services were operated from the West Bromwich depot.

== Go-Ahead ==
On 21 March 2006, Probus Management was purchased by the Go-Ahead Group and integrated into its Go West Midlands operation with the People's Express name dropped from use.

In March 2008, Go West Midlands was sold to Rotala and is now part of Diamond Bus.

== Fleet ==
At the time of the sale to Go-Ahead in March 2006, the fleet composed of 115 buses and coaches.
