= Sidemoor =

Village in Worcestershire, England

Coordinates: 52.339885°N 2.067415°W

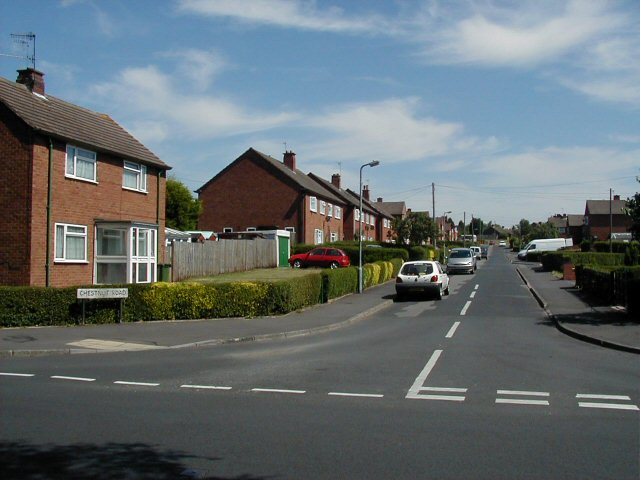
- Chestnut Road, Sidemoor

- Location within Worcestershire
- OS grid reference: SO955713
- District: Bromsgrove
- Shire county: Worcestershire
- Region: West Midlands
- Country: England
- Sovereign state: United Kingdom
- Post town: BROMSGROVE
- Postcode district: B61
- Dialling code: 01527
- Police: West Mercia
- Fire: Hereford and Worcester
- Ambulance: West Midlands

Sidemoor is a village within the urban area of Bromsgrove, Worcestershire.

The local school, Sidemoor First School, opened in 1884 and was relocated in 2007 to a new site on the edge of the village using money from a private finance initiative.

As a result of high housing costs in the town, plans have been submitted to construct more affordable housing in the area, both on the former school site and nearby to the new school.

== Transport ==
=== Bus ===
Route	From	To	Via	Operator	Notes
147	Bromsgrove	Halesowen	Sidemoor, Catshill, Romsley	Kevs Cars & Coaches	
97	Bromsgrove	Sidemoor		Euroliners	
318	Bromsgrove	Stourbridge	Sidemoor, Catshill, Fairfield, Hagley	Diamond	
