= Lickey End =

Village in Worcestershire, England

Coordinates: 52.35221°N 2.044765°W

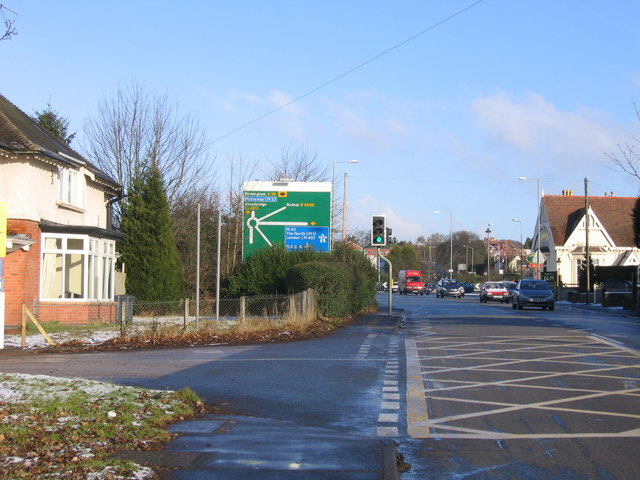
- A38 Lickey End approaching Junction 1 M42

- Location within Worcestershire
- Population: 2,764 (2001 census)
- District: Bromsgrove
- Shire county: Worcestershire
- Region: West Midlands
- Country: England
- Sovereign state: United Kingdom
- Post town: BROMSGROVE
- Postcode district: B61
- Dialling code: 01527
- Police: West Mercia
- Fire: Hereford and Worcester
- Ambulance: West Midlands
- UK Parliament: Bromsgrove

Lickey End is a village in the Bromsgrove district of Worcestershire, England. It is situated just north of Bromsgrove, to the south-east of the junction of the A38 Birmingham Road and the M42 motorway. In 2001 the parish had a population of 2,764. The Old Birmingham Road goes north out of the village, passing through Marlbrook before ending up at the village of Lickey. Lickey End developed during the early 1990s with the addition of a large modern housing estate. The Parish Council that was created on 1 April 2001 was abolished following a ten-year campaign, with effect from 1 April 2011 according to the Lickey End Parish Council Dissolution/Abolition Order of 17 December 2010.
