= Midland Red =

Bus operator and manufacturer in the English Midlands

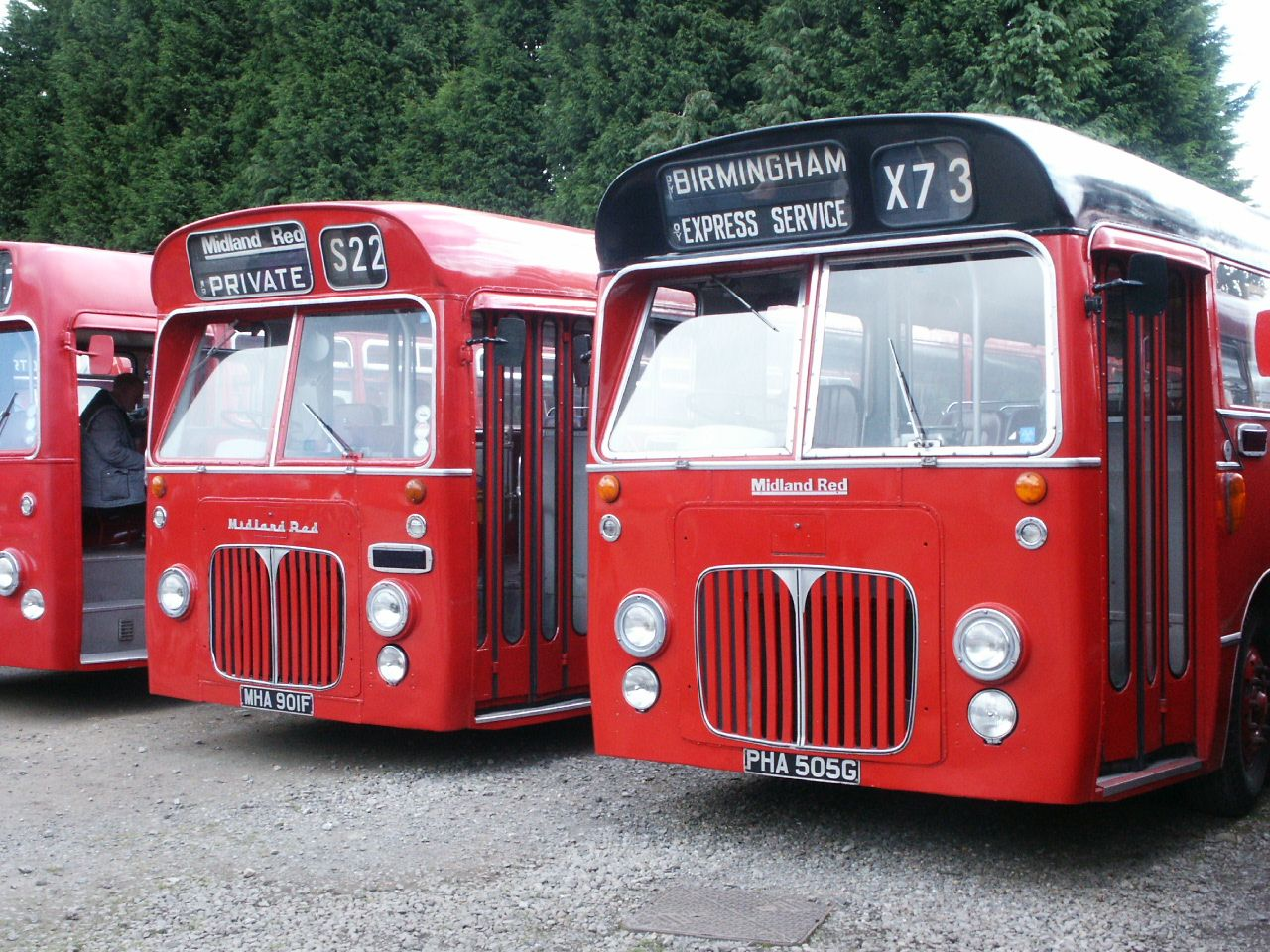
- Preserved BMMO S22s
- Founded: July 1905; 121 years ago
- Ceased operation: 5 September 1981; 45 years ago
- Headquarters: Edgbaston, Birmingham, England
- Service area: Midlands, England
- Service type: Bus operator Bus manufacturer
- Depots: 23 (September 1981)
- Fleet: 838 (September 1981)

Midland Red, also known as the Birmingham & Midland Motor Omnibus Company (BMMO), was a bus company that operated in the Midlands of England from 1905 until 1981. It was one of the largest English bus companies, operating over a large area between Gloucester in the south and Derbyshire in the north, and from Northampton to the Welsh border. The company also manufactured buses.

== History ==
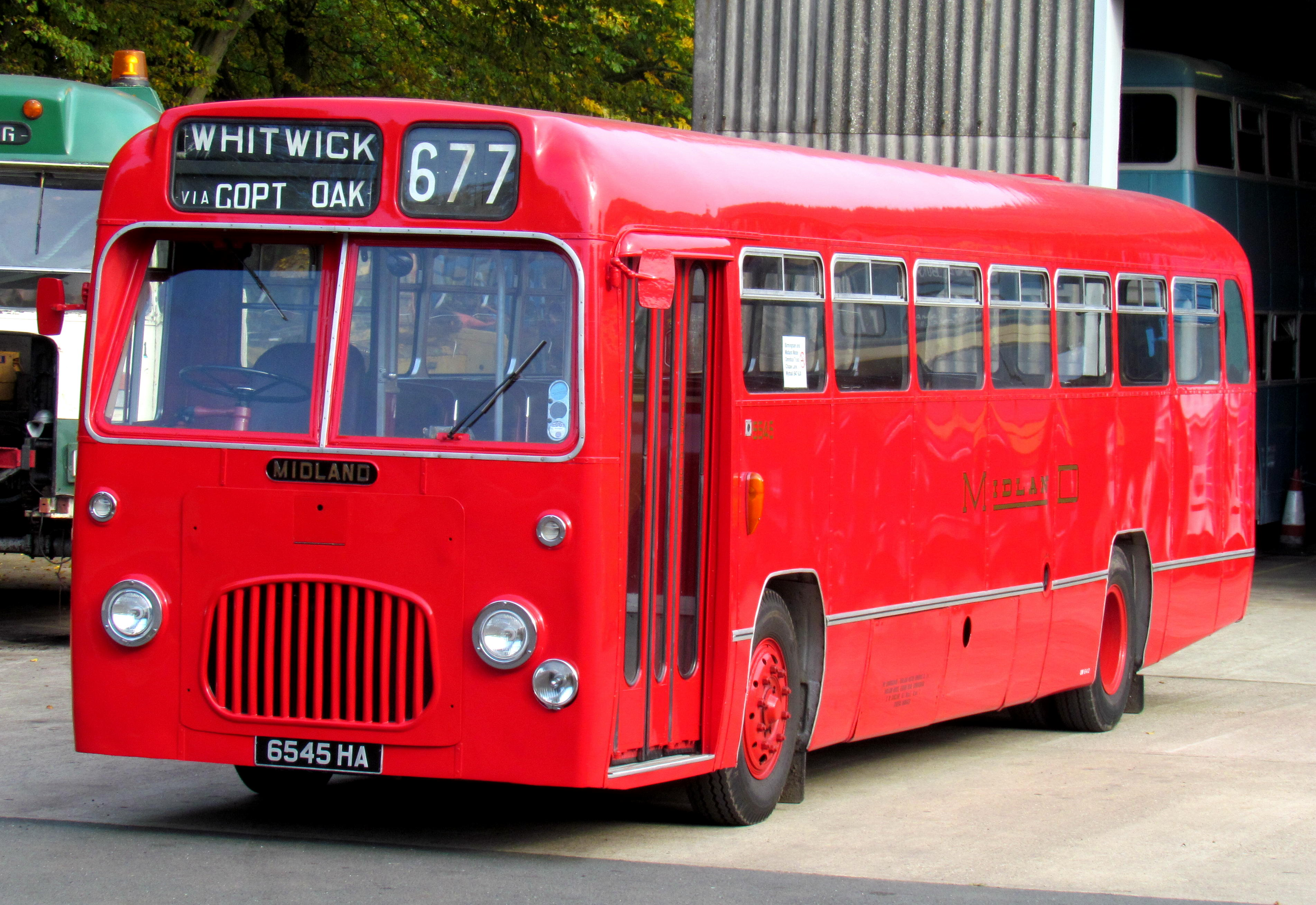
Preserved BMMO S16

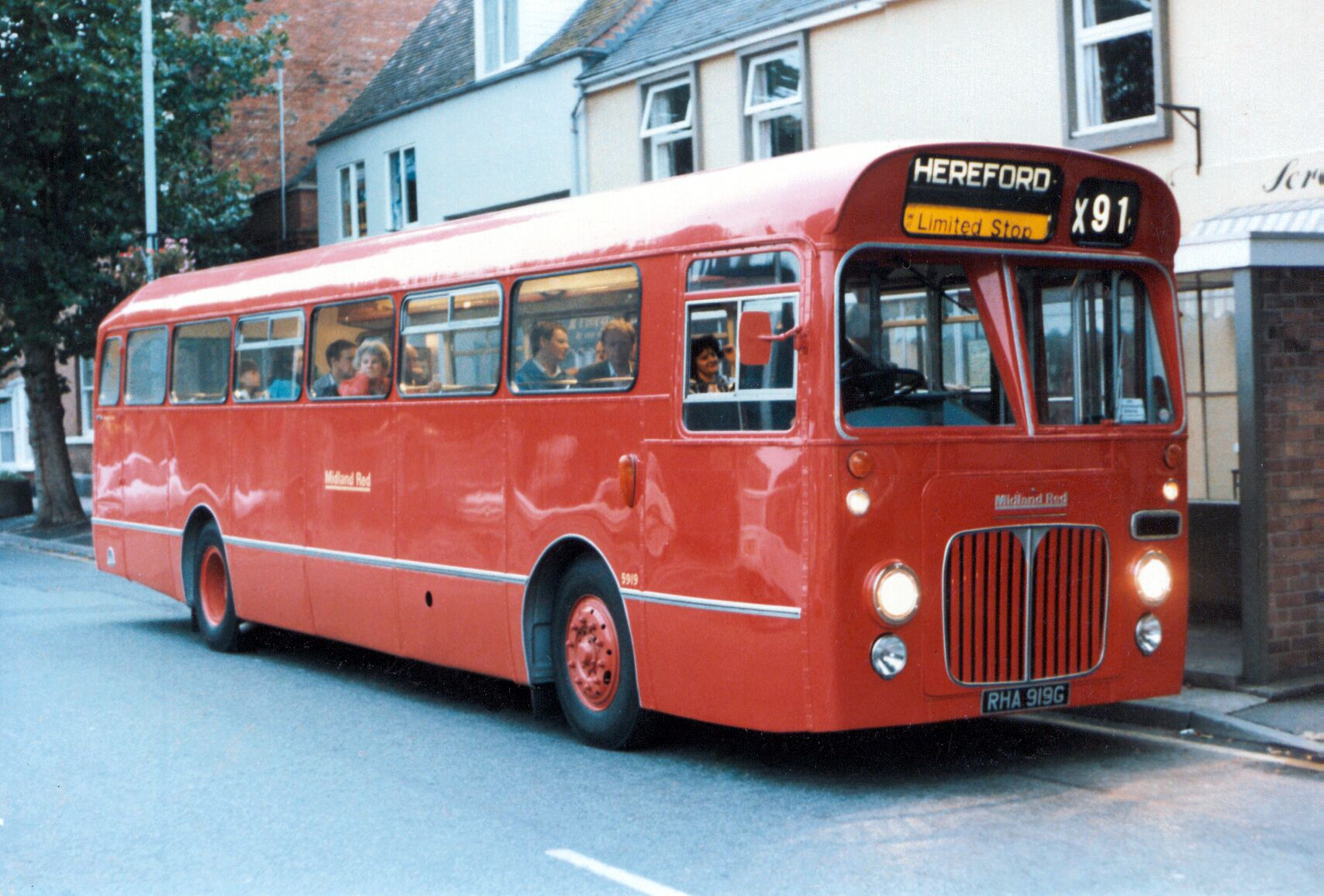
Preserved BMMO S23

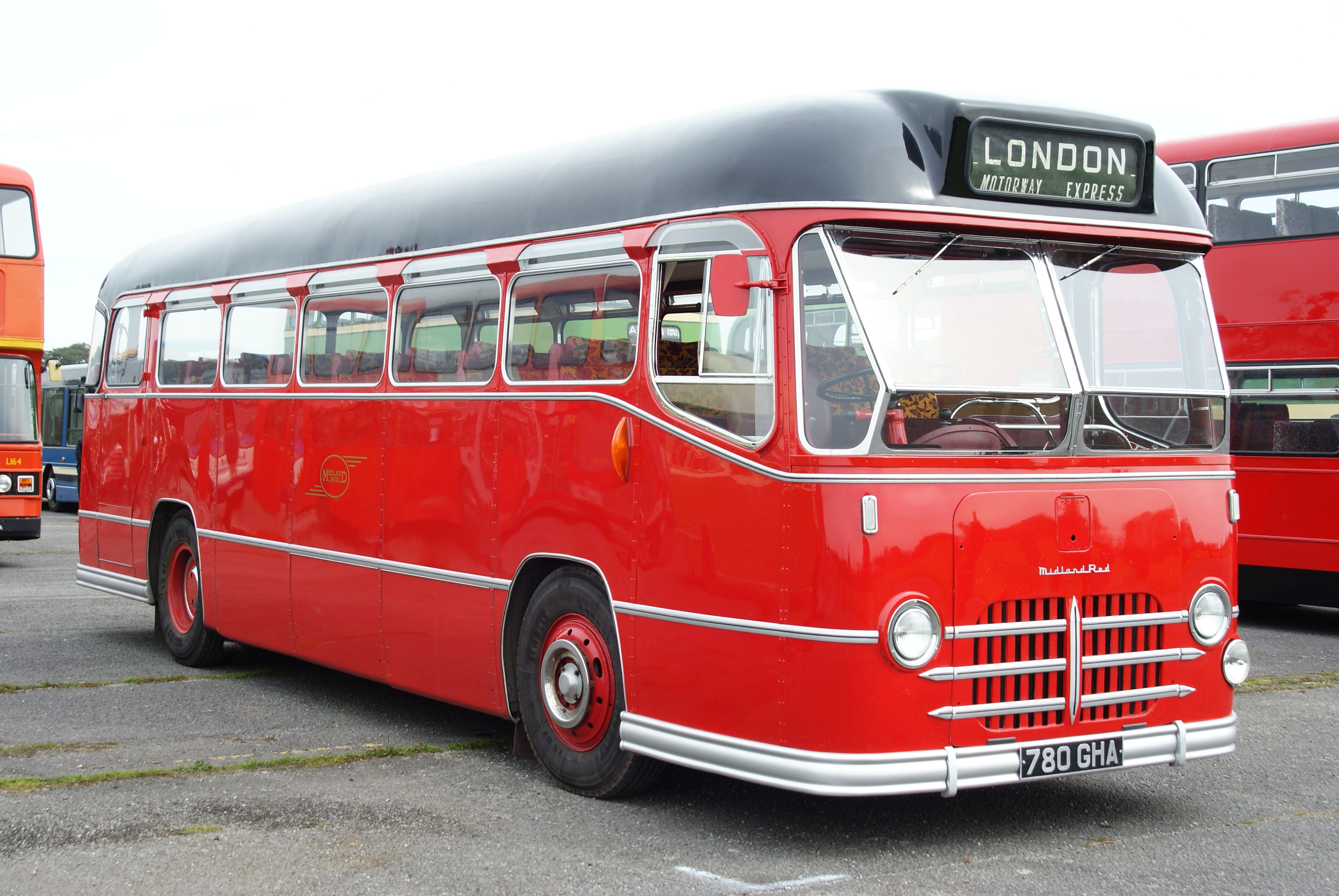
Preserved BMMO C5

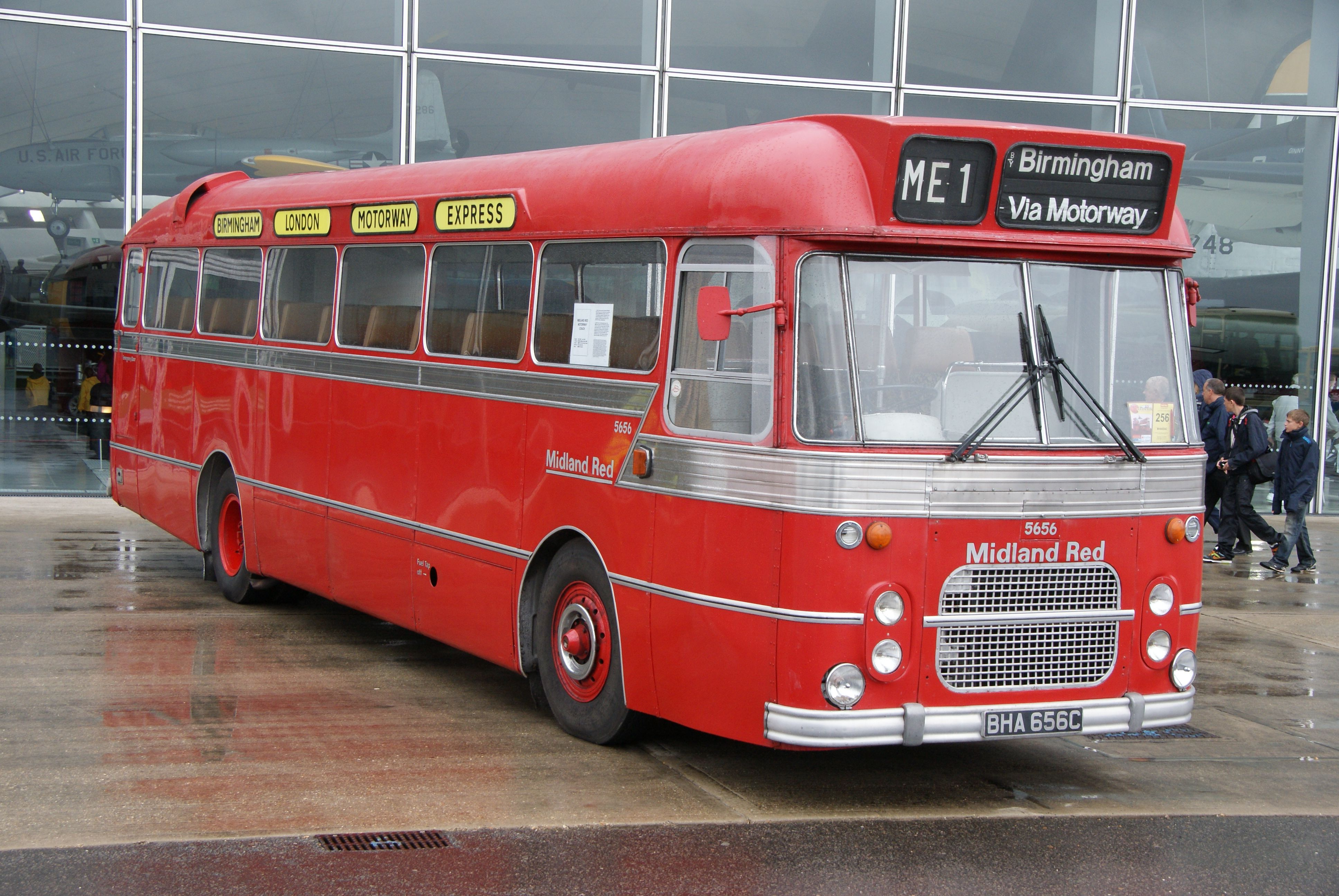
Preserved BMMO CM6

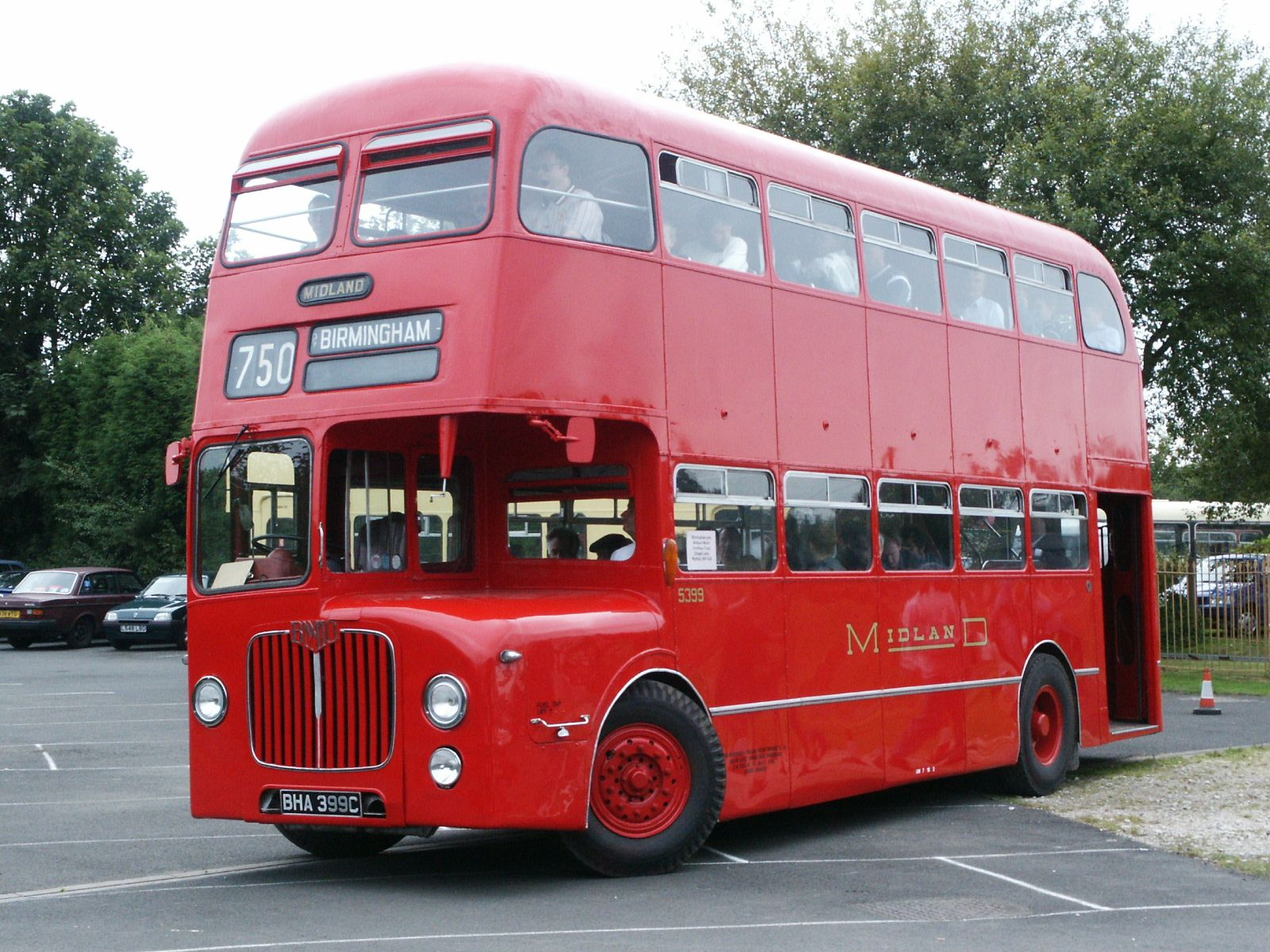
Preserved BMMO D9

=== Origins ===
In 1899, British Electric Traction (BET) acquired the assets of the Birmingham General Omnibus Company, which had been formed three years earlier to acquire a number of horse-drawn omnibus operations in Birmingham. When the BET ordered new buses for Birmingham the next year, they were painted red to make them stand out. In 1902, the BET acquired the City of Birmingham Tramways Company, which operated omnibuses as well as trams.

The Birmingham & Midland Motor Omnibus Company (BMMO) was formed by local businessmen in November 1904 to operate motor bus services in Birmingham. When the directors failed to attract sufficient investors, the BET acquired control of the new company, and in 1905 transferred its local omnibus operations to it. The company also acquired a motor bus company which had started in 1903. BMMO started operations under its own name in July 1905. However, the company experienced problems with its motor buses, and in 1907, reverted all its motor bus services to omnibus operation.

In 1912, the company purchased some Tilling-Stevens petrol-electric buses. Further motor buses followed, and by June 1913, only 17 horse-drawn omnibus remained. The company adopted for its motor buses the red livery used by Birmingham General, and the buses carried the fleetname "Midland". They soon acquired the nickname Midland Red.

=== Expansion outside Birmingham ===
By 1912, the Birmingham Corporation Tramways had used its statutory powers to acquire the city's tramways which it did not already own, and wanted to consolidate the operation of bus and tram operations in the city. Since it was going to be difficult for BMMO to expand in the city, it reached agreement with the corporation to operate services from outside Birmingham into the city and transfer its services within the city to the corporation. The company then expanded outside Birmingham, and moved its headquarters to Bearwood in Smethwick.

During World War I, the company took over BET operations in Worcester and elsewhere, and after the war opened depots in Walsall, Coventry, Wolverhampton, Hereford, Stafford, Banbury, Bromsgrove, Shrewsbury, Nuneaton, Leamington Spa and Leicester. Starting with the replacement of services in Worcester in June 1928, during the late 1920s, the tramways owned by BET in the Black Country were gradually replaced by Midland Red buses.

In 1930, the Great Western Railway and the London Midland & Scottish Railway together acquired 50% of the company. The few GWR bus services in the area were transferred to Midland Red.

=== Coach services ===
Midland Red started express coach services in 1921 with routes to Weston-super-Mare and Llandudno. Coach services expanded, and after the acquisition of long-distance Cheltenham coach operator Black and White Motorways Ltd in 1930, in 1934, Midland Red became a founder member of the Associated Motorways consortium.

Coach services were heavily reduced during World War II, but expanded again after the war. When the M1 motorway opened in 1959, Midland Red started non-stop express services between Birmingham and London, and later between Coventry and London. For the service, the company developed Britain's first high-speed motor-coach. A fleet of ten, capable of speeds of up to 85 miles per hour (140 km/h), were built at the company's workshops at Edgbaston. The opening of the M5 motorway enabled the operation of express services between Birmingham and Worcester.

=== Nationalisation ===
When the railways were nationalised forming in 1947 under the Transport Act 1947, Midland Red became 50% state-owned. In 1968, the BET's UK bus interests were sold to the state-owned Transport Holding Company, which in turn became the National Bus Company (NBC) the following year. Under NBC ownership, Midland Red's livery was changed from a deep red to NBC corporate poppy red.

Following the passage of the Local Government Act 1972, in 1973, Midland Red's garages and routes within the new metropolitan county of the West Midlands, with the exception of Digbeth Coach Station, Bearwood and Cradley Heath, were transferred to the control of the West Midlands Passenger Transport Authority, leaving Midland Red with country and local routes mainly in Derbyshire, Herefordshire, Leicestershire, Nottinghamshire, Shropshire, Staffordshire, Warwickshire and Worcestershire and express services. With the loss of garages and services in and around Birmingham, the company was renamed the Midland Red Omnibus Co. in March 1974.

=== Rebranding ===
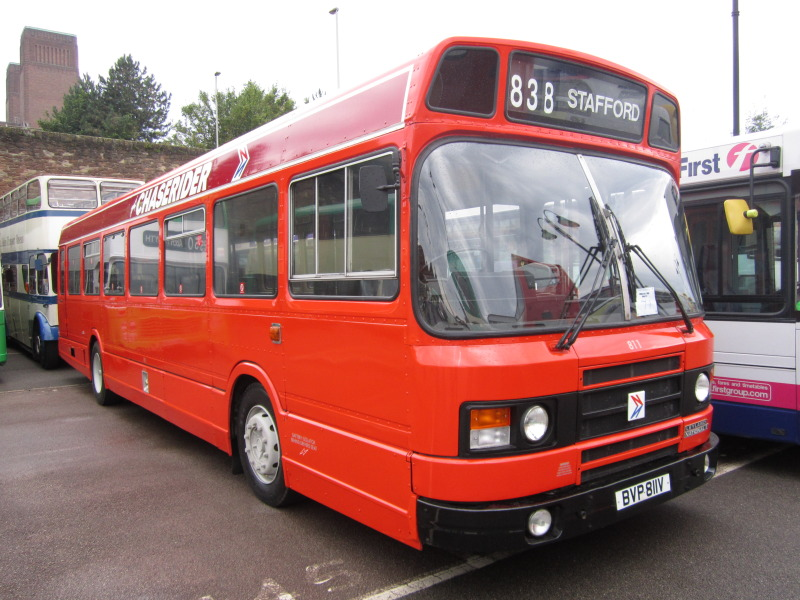
Preserved Leyland National with Chaserider branding

From 1977 onwards, after extensive passenger research the company was rebranded into local area names under the Viable Network Project, something that was soon renamed as the Market Analysis Project and widely adopted throughout NBC and elsewhere in the bus industry. Starting in Evesham, each new network spawned a localised brand, as follows:

- Avonbus: Stratford-upon-Avon
- Chaserider: Cannock & Stafford
- Hotspur: Shrewsbury & Ludlow
- Hunter: Nuneaton & Hinckley
- Lancer: Coalville & Swadlincote
- Leamington & Warwick: Leamington Spa
- Leicester: Leicester (did not carry area branding names)
- Mercian: Tamworth & Lichfield
- Reddibus: Redditch
- Ridercross: Banbury & Kineton
- Rugby Midland Red: Rugby
- Severnlink: Worcester, Malvern & Bromsgrove
- Tellus: Telford
- Wendaway: Kidderminster
- Wayfarer: Evesham
- Wandaward: Hereford
- Midland Express: long-distance and limited stop services

== Breakup ==
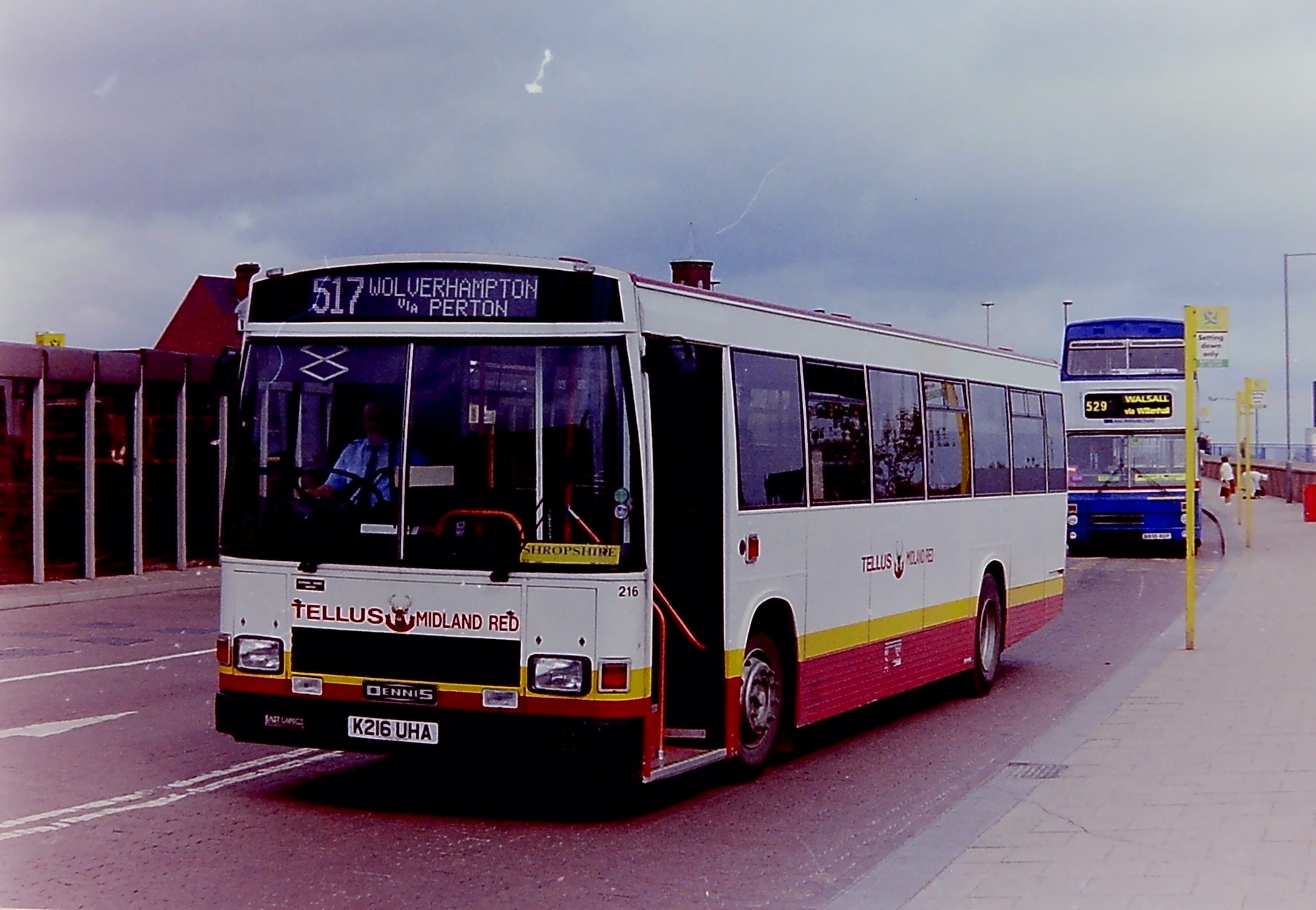
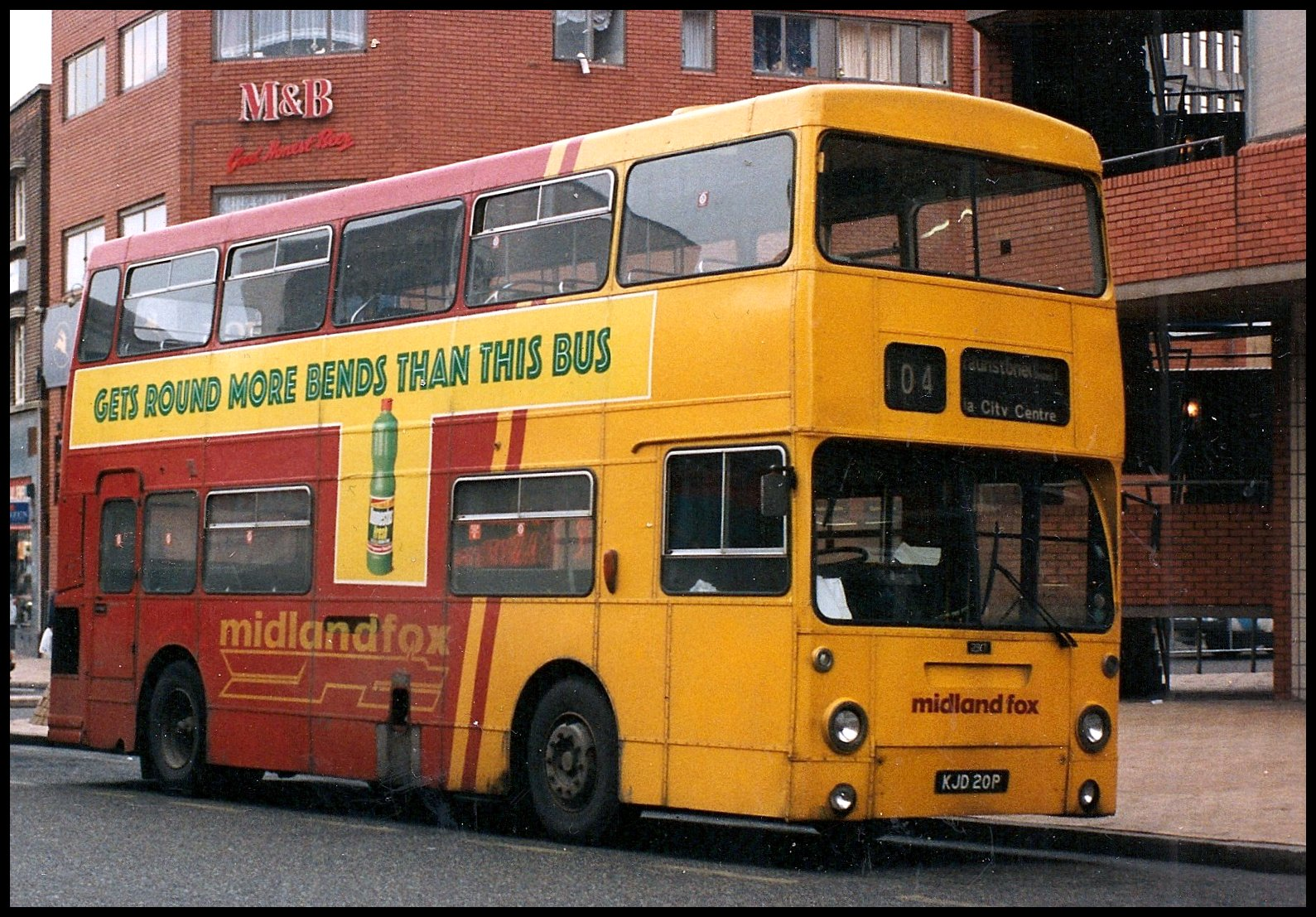
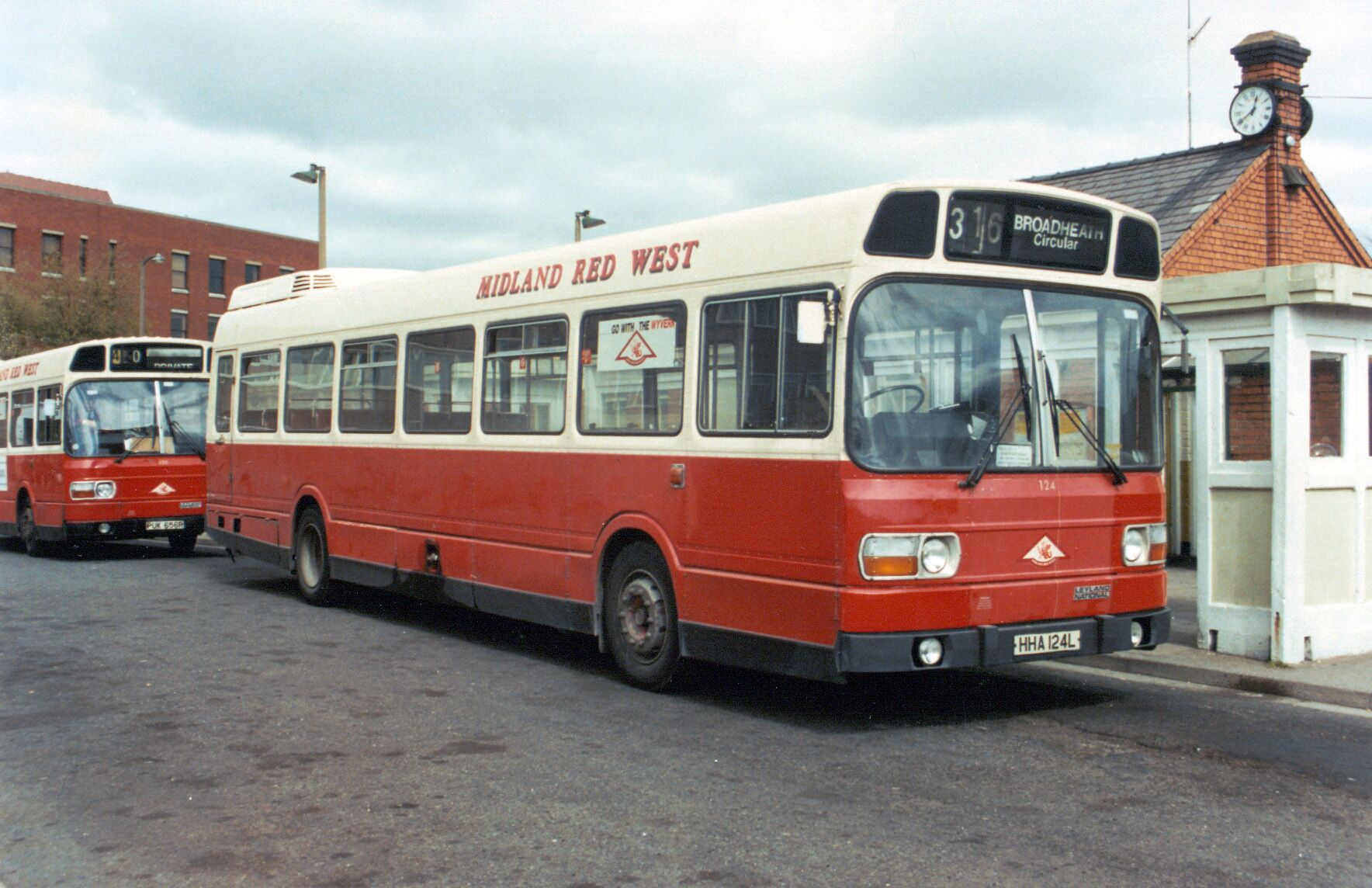
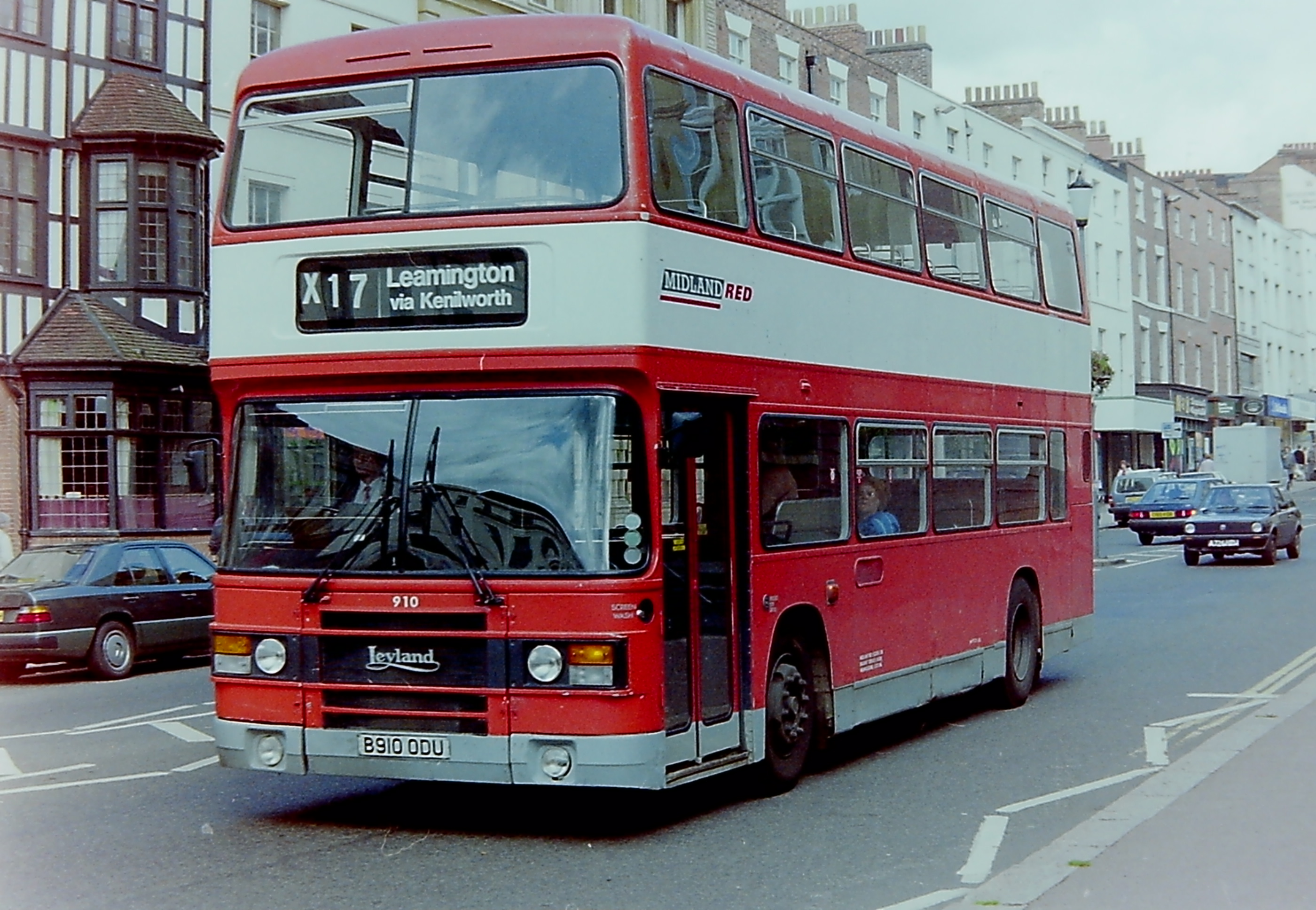
Clockwise from top left: Buses of Midland Red North, Midland Fox (Midland Red East), Midland Red South and Midland Red West in post-deregulation liveries

On 6 September 1981, Midland Red was split into six new companies:

- Midland Red East (renamed Midland Fox in January 1984): Leicestershire, south Derbyshire and east Staffordshire (the Lancer and Leicester operations)
- Midland Red North: Shropshire, south Staffordshire, and northern West Midlands (the Chaserider, Hotspur, Mercian and Tellus operations)
- Midland Red South: Warwickshire and north Oxfordshire (the Avonbus, Hunter, Leamington & Warwick, Ridercross and Rugby operations)
- Midland Red West: Herefordshire, Worcestershire, south and east quadrants of West Midlands (the Reddibus, Severnlink, Wandaward, Wayfarer and Wendaway operations)
- Midland Red Express: central coach and express services division, became part of Midland Red North in 1984 and renamed Midland Red Coaches
- Midland Red Engineering, later renamed Carlyle Works: central engineering workshops at Carlyle Road, Edgbaston

=== Privatisation ===
As part of the privatisation of the National Bus Company, each of the companies were sold between 1986 and 1988:

- Midland Fox was sold on 18 August 1987 in a management buyout, with independent Stevensons of Uttoxeter taking a share of the company and purchasing the Swadlincote depot. Today, all have been reunited as part of Arriva Midlands.
- Midland Red North was sold on 27 January 1988 to the Drawlane Transport Group. It was included in the sale of Drawlane to British Bus, which in turn became part of the Cowie Group. Today, it is part of Arriva Midlands.
- Midland Red South was sold on 10 December 1987 to the Western Travel Group, the holding company for the Cheltenham and Gloucester Omnibus Company. Today, it is part of Stagecoach West and Stagecoach Midlands. Midland Red (South) Ltd is the legal name for Stagecoach Midlands.
- Midland Red West was sold on 22 December 1986 in a management buyout led by managing director Ken Mills to Midland West Holdings, who also took over Midland Red Coaches on the same date. After being purchased by Badgerline in April 1989, it is today part of First Midland Red, however it has only one surviving depot in Worcester; the Kidderminster and Redditch operations were sold to the Rotala Group in January 2013 and integrated into Diamond West Midlands as the FirstGroup withdrew from operating in Hereford.
- Carlyle Works, formerly Midland Red Engineering, was sold to Frontsource Limited, who also purchased the engineering divisions of an initial eight and later nine NBC subsidiaries. After having built numerous minibus bodies and also acquired the rights to build Duple Coachbuilders' body design for the successful Dennis Dart midibus chassis, later renamed the Carlyle Dartline, Carlyle Works collapsed into liquidation in October 1991 after a sharp fall in orders amid the early 1990s recession.

== Bus manufacture ==
In 1912, the company bought its first Tilling-Stevens petrol-electric vehicles. Tilling-Stevens became the main supplier of bus chassis to the company which, under its Chief Engineer LG Wyndham Shire, adapted and developed the designs to its own requirements, finally designing a vehicle it intended to construct itself.

Between 1923 and 1969, the BMMO built most of the buses it operated: up to 1940 these were called SOS (rumoured to stand for Superior Omnibus Specification), and some models were supplied to other bus companies associated within the British Electric Traction (BET) group, namely Trent, PMT and Northern General. After 1940, the vehicles were identified by the company's initials, BMMO, and supplied solely for the BMMO company's own use. Codes later used for buses were FEDD (Front Entrance Double Decker), REDD (Rear Entrance Double Decker), Coaches were initially classified "ONC", but later used a prefix of "C" – or "CM" for Motorway coaches.

Single-deck models after the war were numbered S6, then S8 through S23, while double decker models were numbered D1 through D10. AD2, GD6 and LD8 were exceptions to the normal designation system – these codes referred to batches of respectively AEC, Guy and Leyland vehicles acquired when the manufacturing operation could not meet the heavy demand. Individual buses were numbered from around 2000 to 5900 – registrations usually incorporated the last three numbers of the serial, and a letter prefix of three letters ending in "HA", a Smethwick registration code. This relationship did not apply to the limited number of buses gained as a result of acquisition of other operators.

Bus manufacture, overhaul and accident repair was carried out at Carlyle Works, adjacent to the Rotton Park Reservoir in Edgbaston, Birmingham. Nearby to the works was BMMO's head office in Vernon Road, Edgbaston. After the production of buses ceased in 1970, the last four BMMO-manufactured single-deck buses were withdrawn by Midland Red in 1981.

== Historical list of Midland Red garages ==
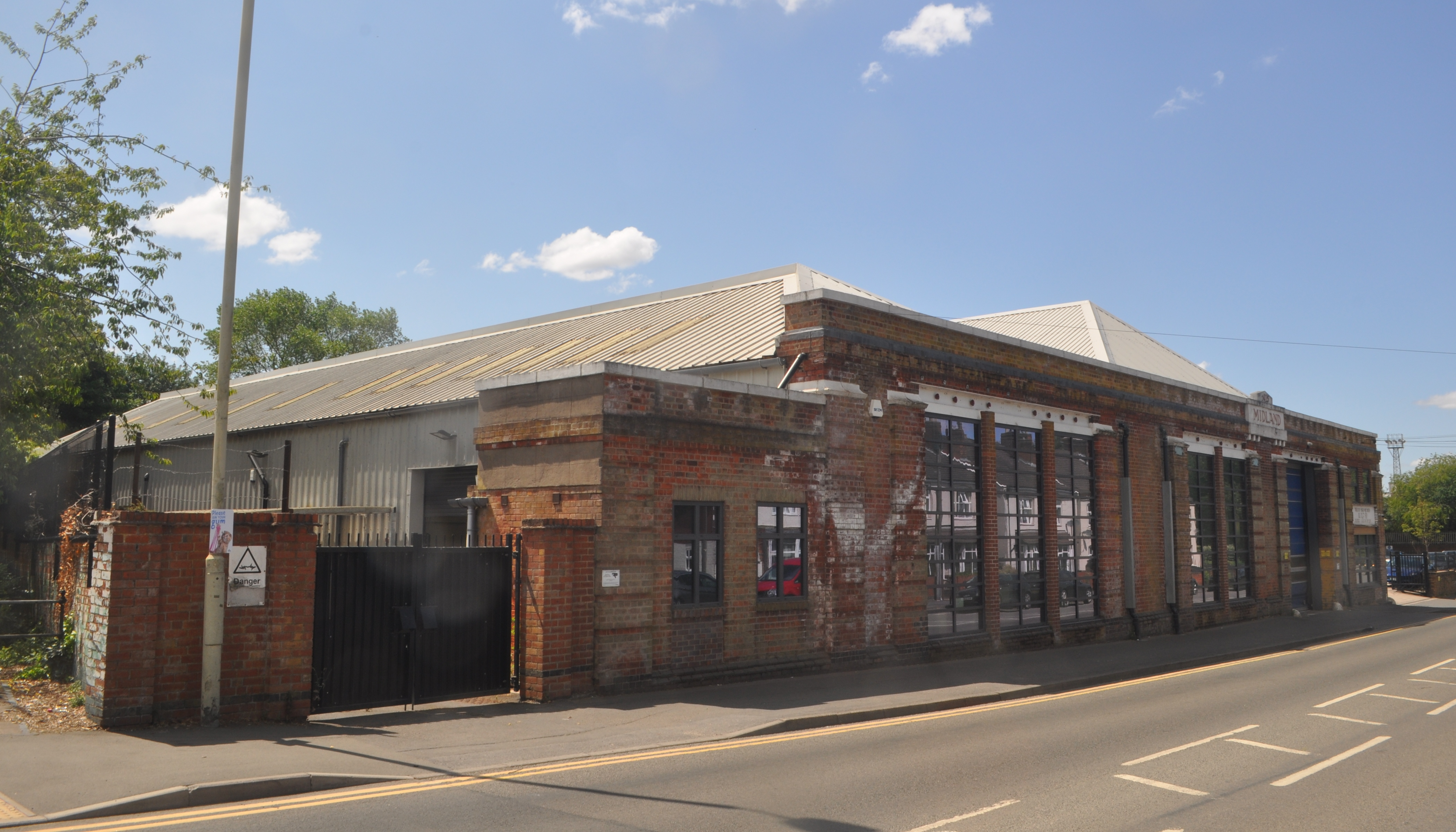
Former Midland Red garage in Coalville in July 2025

- Banbury, Canal Street – [BY]
- Bearwood, Bearwood Road – (Closed 1973) – [BD]
- Birmingham, Digbeth Coach Station – [DH]. Used by Midland Red West for West Midlands PTE area routes.
- Birmingham, Sheepcote Street, Five Ways (Passed to WMPTE) – (Closed 1975) – [SH]
- Birmingham, Tennant Street (Passed to Birmingham Corporation 1914)
- Bishops Castle, Midland Red West outstation
- Brierley Hill, Dudley Road [Harts Hill], (passed to WMPTE) – (Closed 1993) – [HL]. Former tram depot, later demolished after use by furniture company.
- Bromsgrove, The Strand, Birmingham Road – (Closed 1981) – [BE]
- Cannock, Delta Way. The last depot opened by Midland Red. Became Head office for Midland Red North (later Arriva Midlands North). Sold to D&G Bus t/a 'Chaserider' autumn 2020.
- Coalville, Ashby Road – (Closed 2011) – [CE]
- Cradley Heath, Forge Lane – (Closed 1977) – [CY]. Building now used for commercial purposes.
- Dudley, Birmingham Road (passed to WMPTE) – (Closed 1993) – [DY]. Former tram depot, demolished for Dudley Southern Bypass.
- Evesham, Abbey Road – (Closed 2006) – [EM]
- Heath Hayes, Hednesford Road (formerly Harper Brothers) – (Closed 1977)
- Hereford, Friar Street – (Closed 2015) – [HD]. Operations now in hands of independent bus operators.
- Hinckley, Lower Coventry Road – (Closed 1979) – [HY]
- Kidderminster, KDL&T depot (now Tram Road) former tram depot
- Kidderminster, New Road – (Closed 2001) – [KR]. Operations in Kidderminster sold to Diamond Bus in 2013.
- Kineton, Brookhampton Road (formerly Stratford Blue)
- Leamington Spa, Old Warwick Road – (Closed 1980) – [LN]
- Leamington Spa, Myton Road – (Closed 1991)
- Leicester, Southgate Street – (Closed 2009) – [SS]
- Leicester, Sandacre Street – (Closed 1996) – [SA]
- Lichfield, Trent Valley Road (used by Staffordshire County Highways Dept) – [LD]
- Ludlow, Weeping Cross Lane – (Closed 1983) – [LW]
- Malvern, Portland Road – (Closed 1954)
- Malvern Link, Spring Lane – (Closed 1976) – [MN]
- Market Harborough, formerly N&S – (Closed 2005)
- Markfield, Shaw Lane, (formerly Brown's Blue Coaches Ltd) – (Closed 1968)
- Nuneaton, Coton Road – (Closed 1960)
- Nuneaton, Newtown Road – [NN]
- Oldbury, Birchley Crossing (passed to WMPTE) – (Closed 1975) – [OY].
- Redditch, Church Road – (Closed 2004) – [RH]. Operations and replacement depot sold to Diamond Bus in 2013.
- Rugby, Railway Terrace – [RY]
- Shrewsbury, Ditherington – (Closed 2012) – [SY]. Passed to Arriva Midlands, site sold to Shrewsbury Council for redevelopment.
- Stourbridge, Foster Street (passed to WMPTE) – (Closed 1985) – [SE]. Demolished and replaced by car dealership.
- Stafford, Pilgrim Place, Newport Road – (Closed 1992) – [SD]
- Stratford-upon-Avon, Warwick Road (formerly Stratford Blue) – (Closed 1990). Now a commercial tyre depot.
- Sutton Coldfield, Upper Holland Road (passed to WMPTE) – (Closed 1984) – [SN]. Demolished and replaced by housing development.
- Swadlincote, Midland Road – (Demolished 2010) – [SW]. Replaced by Old Railway Mews housing development.
- Tamworth, Watling Street, Twogates (Reliant works) – [TH]. Replaced by The Garage housing development.
- Tamworth, Aldergate
- Warwick, Emscote Road (formerly L&WT Co Ltd) – (Closed 1957)
- Wellington, Charlton Street – (Closed 2012) – [WL]. Replaced by new Arriva Midlands depot in Stafford Park, Telford.
- Wigston, Station Street, South Wigston – [WS]
- Wolverhampton, Bilston Street – (Closed 1964). Located opposite since demolished former Wolverhampton Corporation (later West Midlands Travel) depot.
- Wolverhampton, Dudley Road – (Closed 1971) – [WN]. Used by bus operator Travel Express Ltd, which operates as Let's Go.
- Worcester, East Street – [WR]
- Worcester, Padmore Street

Other short time-span garages (either owned or rented) included:

- Birmingham, Ladywood Road (Five Ways Inn yard)
- Coventry, Sandy Lane;
- Cradley, (GWR station yard)
- Halesowen, Mucklow Hill (GWR station yard)
- Hereford, Bridge Street (Black Lion Yard)
- Kingswinford, The Portway
- Leicester, Frog Island
- Leicester, Hastings Road
- Leicester, Welford Road
- Nuneaton, Burgage Walk (ex NWMO&T Co)
- Nuneaton, Heath End Road
- Nuneaton, the former Empire theatre
- Sedgley, WDET Co depot
- Shrewsbury, Abbey foregate (ex Allen Omnibus Co)
- Shrewsbury, Roushill
- Stafford, Co-operative Street
- Wellington, Mansell Street

== See also ==
- The Transport Museum, Wythall
