= Catshill =

Village in Worcestershire, England

Coordinates: 52.36224°N 2.06016°W

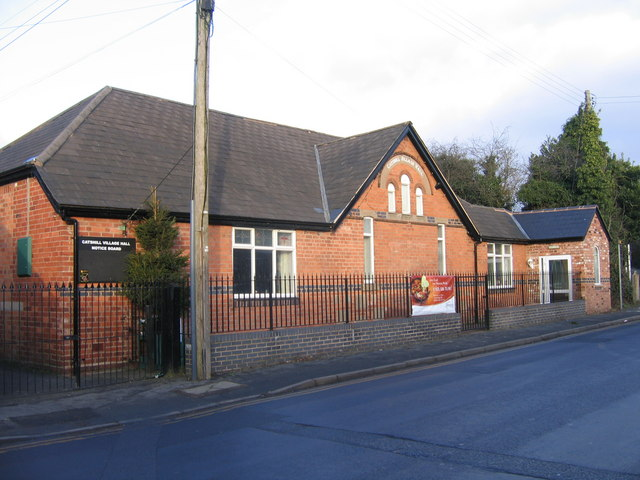
- Catshill Village Hall, located on Golden Cross Lane

- Location within Worcestershire
- Population: 6,974 (2021)
- OS grid reference: SO960738
  - London: 102 miles (164 km)
- Civil parish: Catshill and North Marlbrook
- District: Bromsgrove
- Shire county: Worcestershire
- Region: West Midlands
- Country: England
- Sovereign state: United Kingdom
- Post town: BROMSGROVE
- Postcode district: B61
- Dialling code: 01527
- Police: West Mercia
- Fire: Hereford and Worcester
- Ambulance: West Midlands
- UK Parliament: Bromsgrove

Catshill is a village in the civil parish of Catshill and North Marlbrook, in the Bromsgrove district, in Worcestershire, England, about 3 miles north of Bromsgrove and 10 miles south-west of Birmingham. The parish of Catshill was formed around the Turnpike Road (A38) in 1844.

The population of Catshill and North Marlbrook in 2021 was 6,974.

== Education ==
Catshill is home to Catshill First School and Catshill Middle School. The first school Catshill First School and Nursery is located in the centre of the village on Gibb Lane. The Middle School was built in 1939, and was converted from a Secondary Modern to a Middle School in 1970. The village has a small library, though it is not open every day. Catshill also has a village hall in which many different learning activities take place, from karate to IT skills.

== Transport ==
Catshill is served by regular bus services by First Midland Red, Diamond West Midlands, National Express West Midlands and MRD Travel. There are routes to Longbridge, University Hospital in Birmingham, Halesowen, Stourbridge, Bromsgrove, Worcester and Droitwich.

With nearby access to the M5 and M42 motorways, Catshill is within commuting distance by car to both Worcester and Birmingham.

== History ==
In 1828, a Baptist chapel was opened in Little Catshill. The parish church Christ Church, Catshill opened ten years later in 1838.

Catshill developed in the nineteenth century through nailmaking and, by 1914, it was one of the few villages in the area which produced nails.

== Famous people ==
The poet Alfred Edward Housman lived in Catshill. The professional footballer Roy Hartle (Bolton Wanderers) was born here. For more than a quarter of a century, Sarah Hilda Haines was the much respected district nurse (plaque in church) who received the royal Maundy in 1980 at Worcester. Her son, Roy Martin Haines, a Foundation Scholar of Bromsgrove School, became a mediaeval historian (Worcester College, Oxford) and professor at Dalhousie University, Canada. A Fellow of the Society of Antiquaries and a life member of Clare Hall, Cambridge, he was awarded the degrees of D.Phil.and D.Litt. of Oxford.
