= First Worcester =

British bus operating company

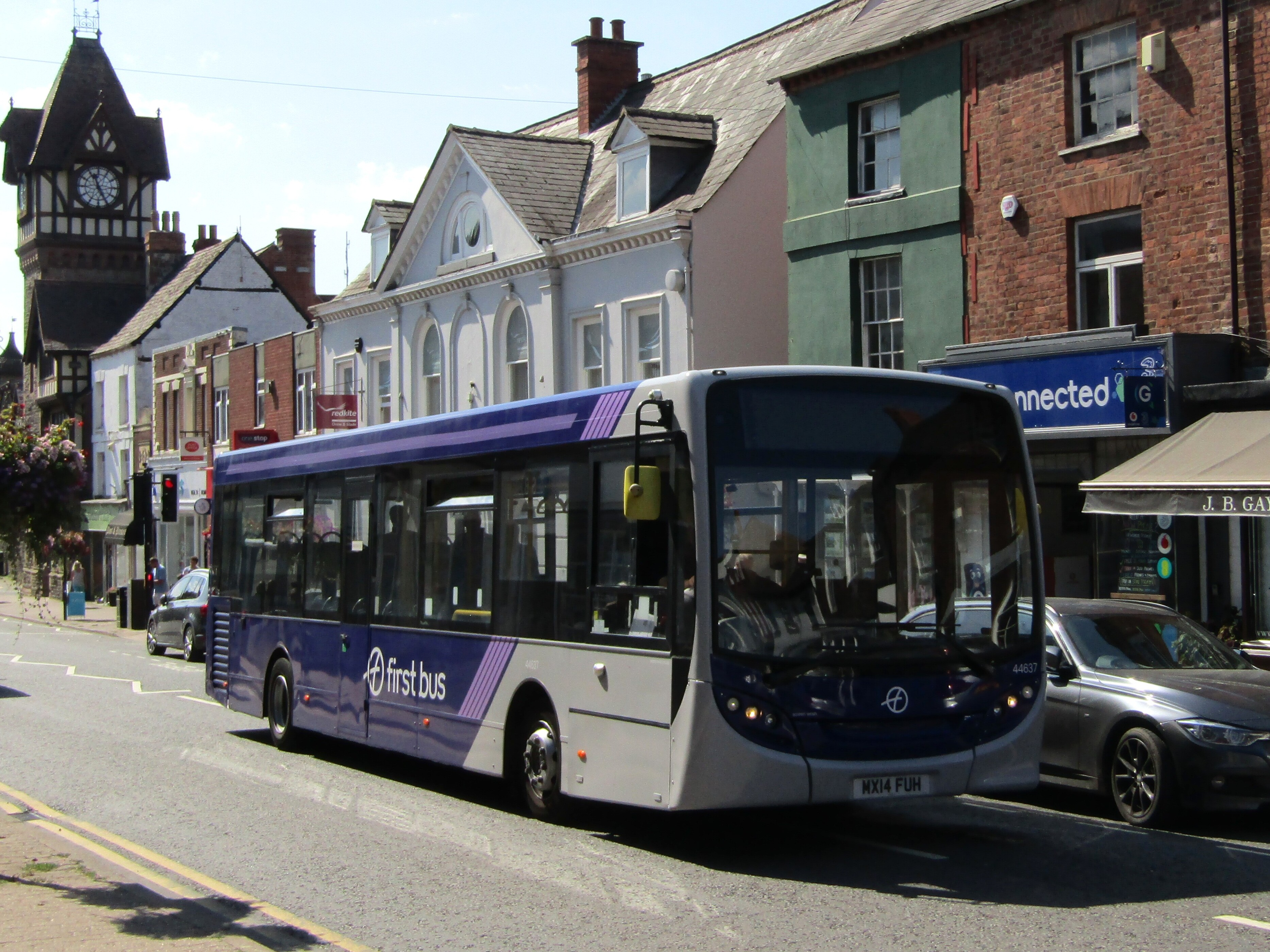
- Alexander Dennis Enviro200 in Ledbury in August 2026
- Parent: FirstGroup
- Founded: 6 September 1981
- Headquarters: Abbey Lane, Leicester
- Service area: Herefordshire; Worcestershire
- Service type: Bus services
- Depots: Padmore Street, Worcester
- Website: firstbus.co.uk/worcestershire

First Midland Red Buses, trading as First Worcester, is a bus company operating services in Herefordshire and Worcestershire in the English Midlands. It is a subsidiary of FirstGroup, and is managed as part of the First West of England business unit.

== History ==
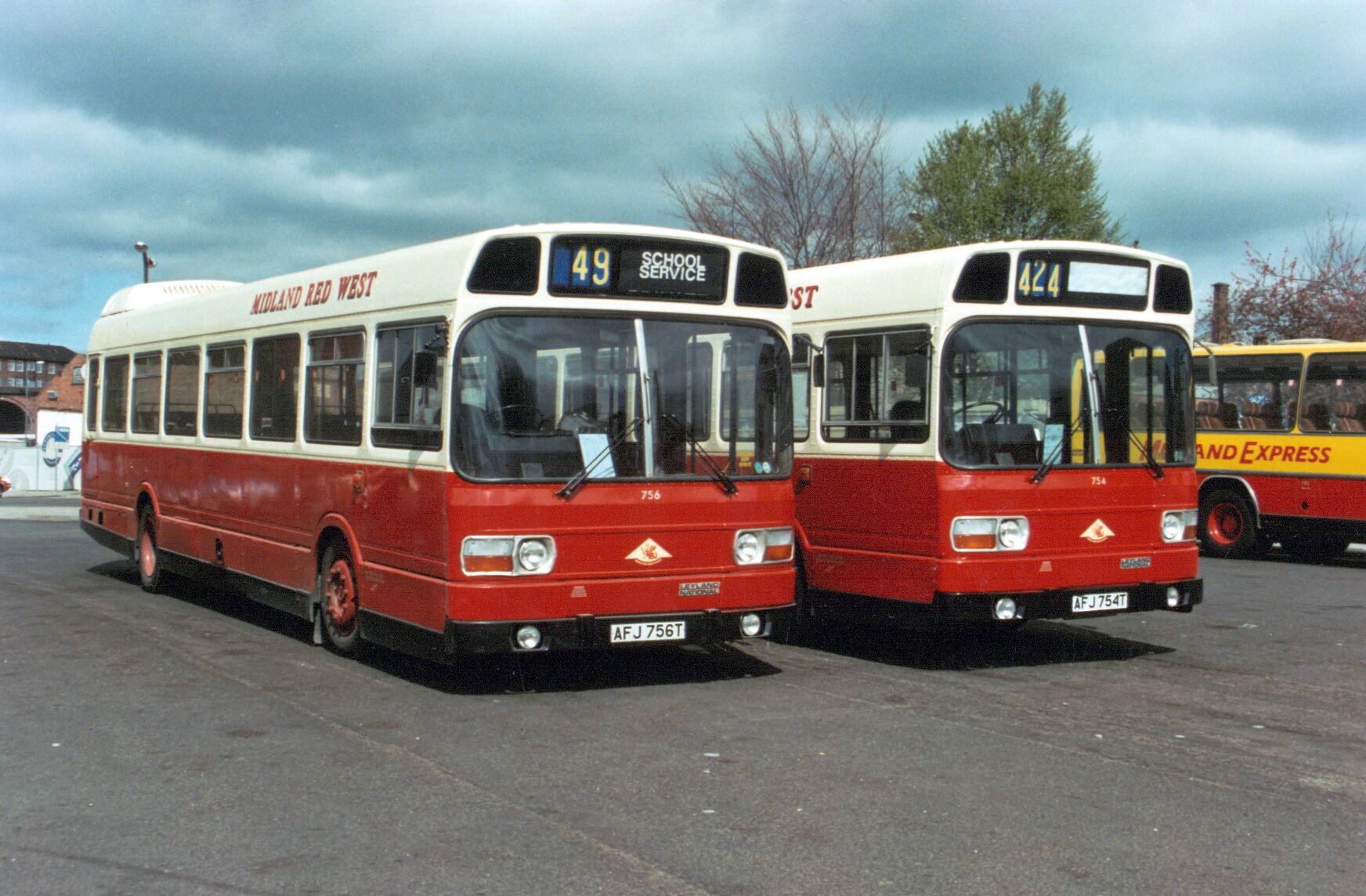
Midland Red West Leyland Nationals in April 1990

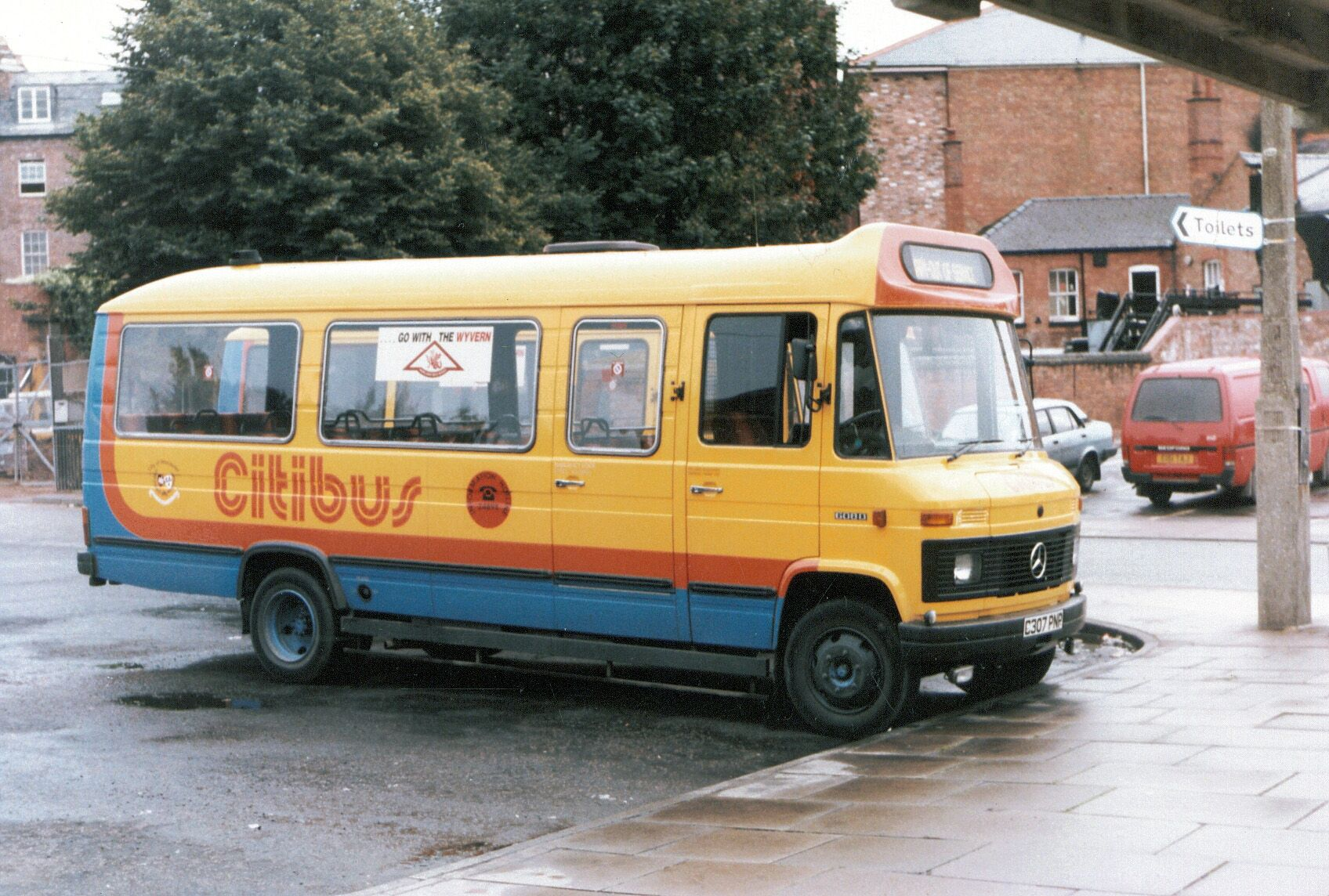
Citibus branded Mercedes-Benz L608D in August 1987

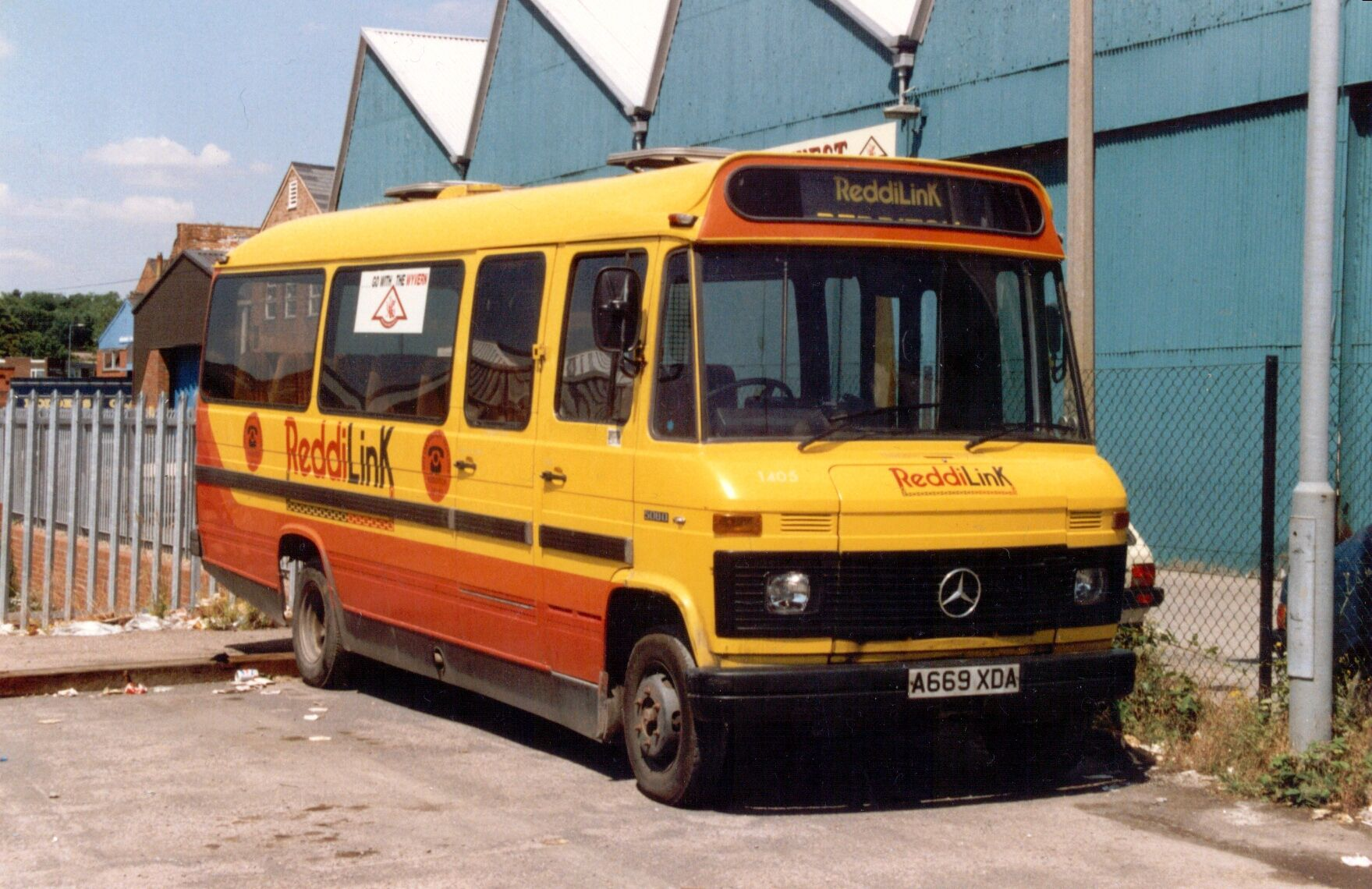
ReddiLink branded Mercedes-Benz L608D in July 1989

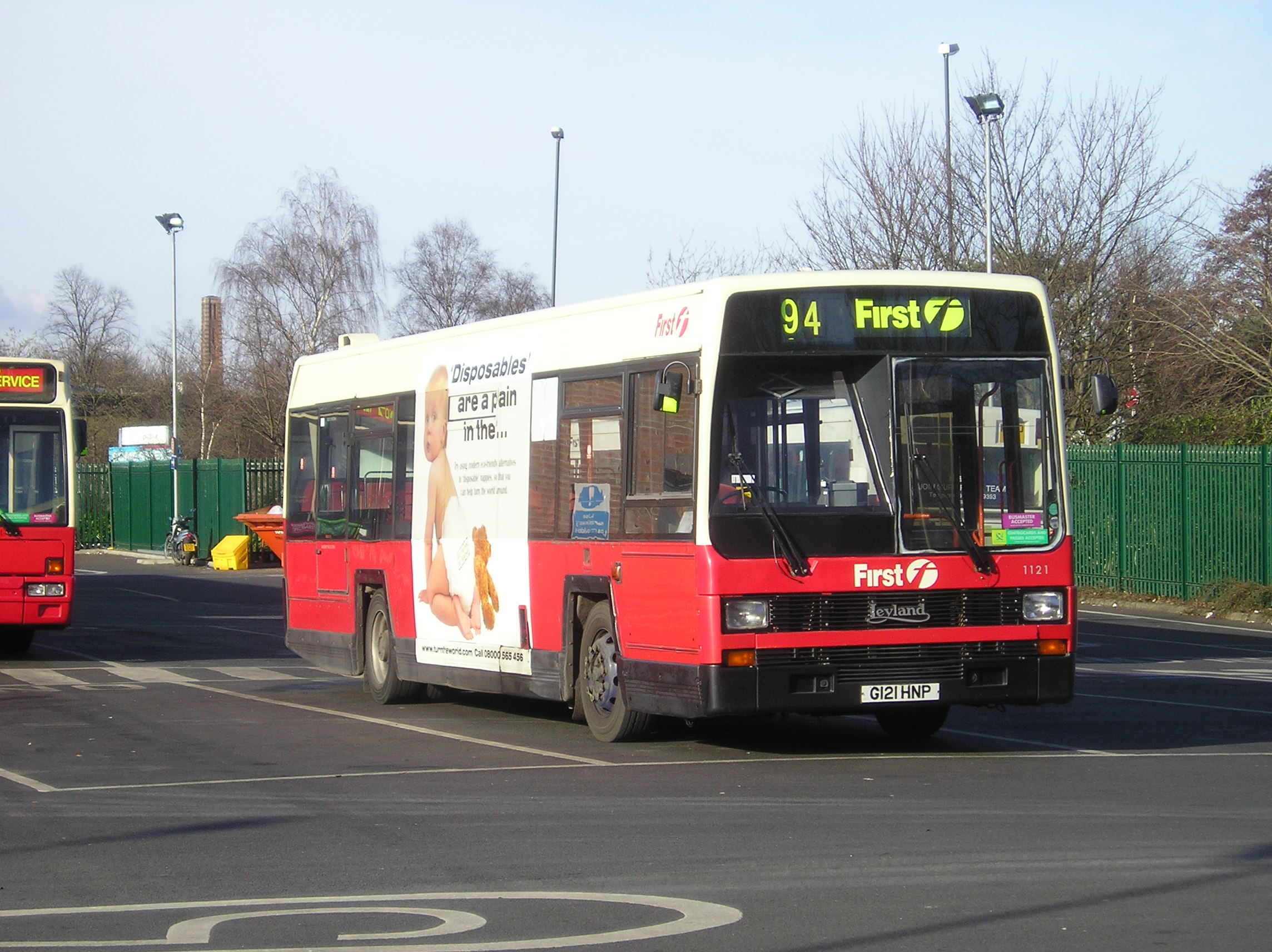
Leyland Lynx at Kidderminster depot in February 2004

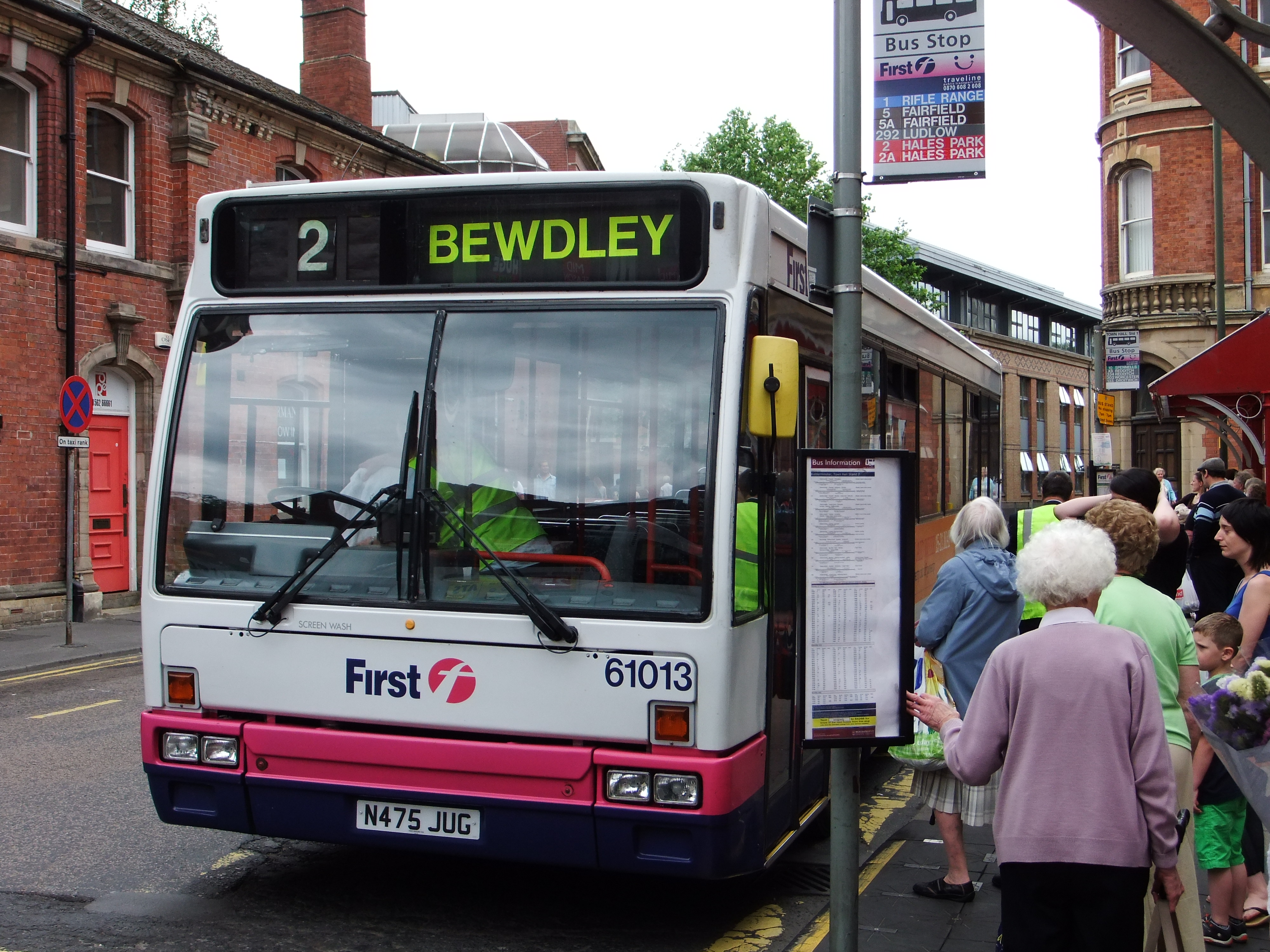
Plaxton Verde bodied Dennis Lance in Kidderminster in June 2011

In September 1981 Midland Red West was formed with 183 buses operating from six depots in Gloucestershire, Hereford, Worcestershire and Powys as part of the breakup of the Midland Red bus company. In September 1983 the 20 vehicle Bromsgrove depot was closed.

Based in Worcester, Midland Red West's main areas of operation were Worcestershire, Herefordshire, parts of Shropshire and parts of the West Midlands conurbation, including Birmingham. Birmingham was also served by the other companies formed from the break-up of Midland Red.

=== Minibus operations ===
In November 1985 Midland Red West introduced a fleet of 60 minibuses to operate its urban network in Worcester as part of a new high-frequency service within the city, operating under the Citibus trading name. The distinctive yellow, orange and blue liveried Mercedes-Benz L608Ds displaced larger buses such as Leyland Nationals onto interurban routes. At its launch the service was the UK's largest urban bus service operated by minibuses.

=== Privatisation ===
In December 1986 Midland Red West along with the 40 vehicle Midland Red Coaches was sold to Midland West Holdings in a management buyout.

The livery of many of its vehicles changed from the National Bus Company's poppy red to a deeper red and cream livery. The company also sported a new logo of a Wyvern. Apart from being the name of an imaginary creature, the name Wyvern was also a portmanteau of the 2 major rivers which run through Herefordshire and Worcestershire; the Wye and Severn.

In 1987 Midland Red West Holdings purchased the Bristol Omnibus Company from the National Bus Company. It operated urban services around the Bristol area under the City Line trading name, which was kept.

=== Badgerline Group ===
In April 1988 Midland Red West Holdings was purchased by fellow Bristol operator Badgerline. The trading names of Midland Red West and Badgerline remained unchanged as did vehicle livery, though many of Midland Red West's Leyland Lynxs sported a badger motif on the rear sides of the vehicle. The merger reunited the two constituent parts of the Bristol Omnibus Company, City Line and the Bristol country services which had been separated in 1986. In 1995 Badgerline merged with GRT Group to form FirstBus. In 1999 Midland Red West was rebranded as First Midland Red.

== Fleet ==
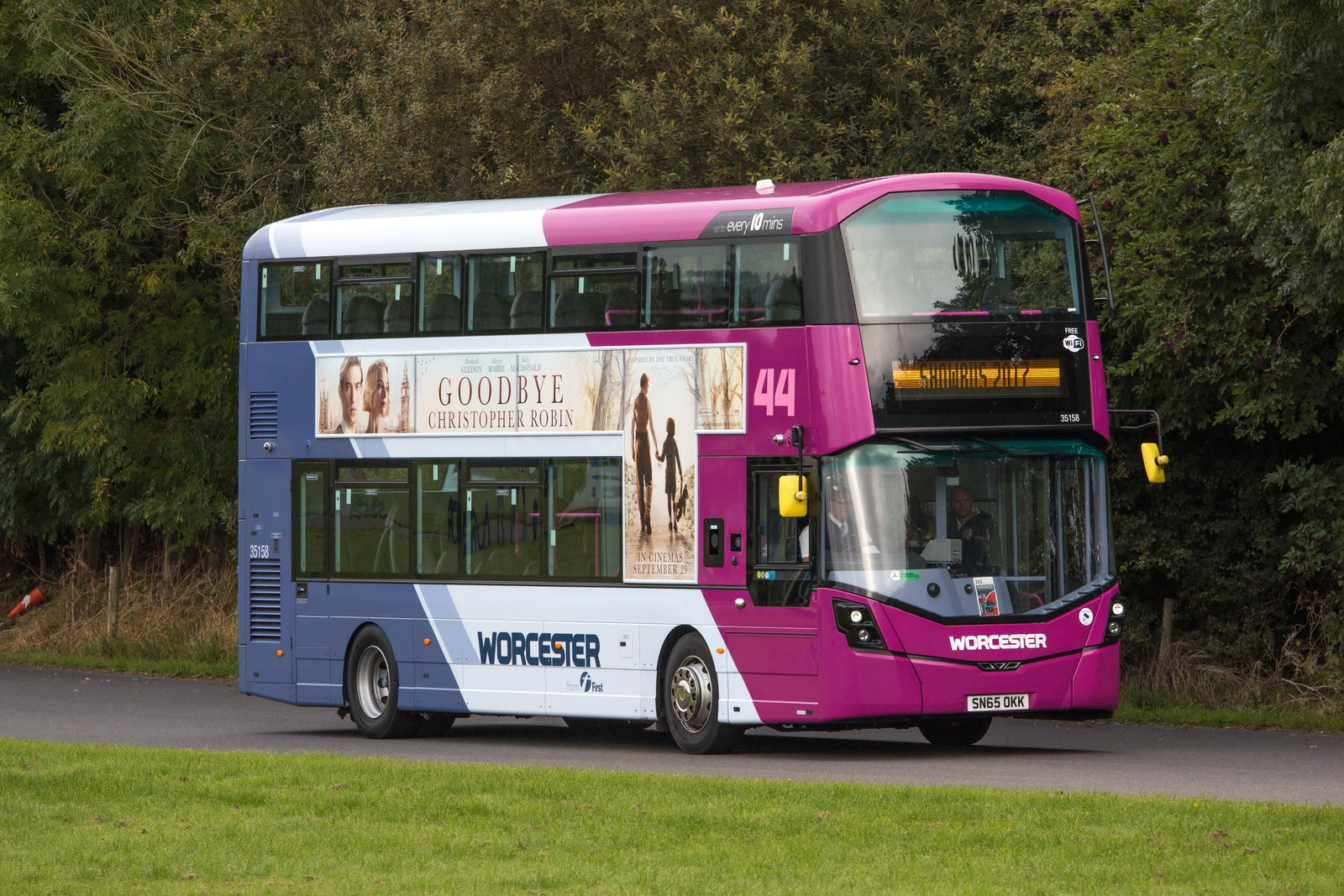
Wright StreetDeck at Showbus 2017

In 1990 Midland Red West began to expand and modernise its fleet of full-size single deck buses purchasing 50 Leyland Lynxs, which were put into service at Digbeth depot, displacing all that depot's Leyland Nationals. Eight of these Lynxs shortly found their way to Redditch depot and two years later five of these eight Redditch Lynxes ended up at Kidderminster depot, while Redditch acquired four more from Digbeth.

In 1994 37 new Plaxton Verde bodied Dennis Lances, which were now the Badgerline Group's standard full-size single deck bus, arrived at Digbeth, displacing the existing Leyland Lynxes to Kidderminster and Redditch depots.

The modern day fleet mainly consists of Alexander Dennis buses, including Alexander Dennis Enviro200s, Alexander Dennis Enviro300s and Alexander Dennis Enviro400s.

== Services ==
Most services depart from Crowngate Bus Station in Worcester towards Great Malvern, Bromsgrove (including Catshill) and Evesham as well as the city suburbs. There are occasional rural services to Baynhall on route 332 (otherwise run by Astons Coaches to Upton-on-Severn), Upton on route 333, Ryall on route 636, Ledbury on route 417, once a day to Bromyard on route 420, otherwise run solely by DRM Bus ever since Hereford closed (who used to run the 420). Service 363 used to run hourly to Tewkesbury but had been cut back to Ryall by 2020. There are also a few occasional services operating outside Worcestershire such as the Wednesdays only 405 (Ledbury - Hereford via Bromyard) and Fridays only 482 (Ledbury - Leominster via Bromyard).

Before and after First formation, services 371, 372 and 373 used to run to Gloucester. These have since been withdrawn.

Between 2018 and 2020, First won the contract to run Mondays only route 481 (Ledbury - Cheltenham Spa via Malvern Link, Upton-on-Severn and Tewkesbury)

Service 144, branded as "The Salt Road", operates between Worcester and Catshill, and until May 2022, operated hourly services into Birmingham. The Birmingham section of the route was curtailed due to low passenger numbers, bringing an end to the Worcester-Birmingham service after 108 years.

== Operations ==
The company has one depot located on Padmore Street in Worcester.

=== Former operations ===
In January 2013, the Kidderminster and Redditch depots were sold to Rotala with 36 buses who integrated it with its Diamond Bus subsidiary.

In September 2015, First Midland Red ceased operating services in Hereford with the depot closed. At the time it operated 19 buses. The Hereford routes were taken over by Yeomans while DRM took over the service to Worcester. The company still runs one bus a week on Wednesdays into Hereford from Ledbury.
