= Badger Vectis =

British bus operating company, 1987–1988

- Parent: Badgerline (80%); Southern Vectis (20%)
- Founded: September 1987
- Ceased operation: March 1988
- Headquarters: Poole
- Service area: Poole & Bournemouth
- Service type: Bus operator

Badger Vectis was an English bus company based in Poole. A post-deregulation joint venture between Weston-super-Mare based bus company Badgerline and Isle of Wight bus company Southern Vectis, it was set up in September 1987 to compete with incumbent operator Wilts & Dorset. The buses all used the Badgerline brand. After a noted bus war between the two large companies, Badger Vectis folded in March 1988.

== Formation ==
Badger Vectis was formed in September 1987 as a joint venture between Badgerline (80%) and Southern Vectis (20%), after both recently privatised bus companies had failed in a joint bid earlier in the year to buy Wilts & Dorset, which was, like its suitors, a former nationalised National Bus Company subsidiary. Wilts & Dorset had instead been privatised via a management buyout. Badgerline had already been competing with Wilts & Dorset in Salisbury since June 1987, while Southern Vectis had already set up a mainland subsidiary, Solent Blue Line, to compete in Southampton.

Headed by a regional director from Badgerline, the new operation used vehicles from both partners, as well as from elsewhere, and rented garage space from the other local operator Yellow Buses at their Mallard Road depot, in north-east Bournemouth. It traded as Badgerline, using the same livery as its parent company, although with more green on the front of buses, due to a perceived clash with Yellow Buses' livery.

== Operation ==
Badger Vectis competed with Wilts & Dorset using a network focused on urban routes, radiating from Poole, with an important corridor being the coast road between Poole and Bournemouth. The company's tactic was to use a combination of a frequent and simple to understand Iveco minibus operated routes, branded as Minilinks, together with 2 person crew-operated larger buses, Bristol RE single-deck buses, to compete with Wilts & Dorset's largely archaic, complex and infrequent, established operations, which had no minibuses and no crew operated buses, and which had routes which ranged over a large rural area as well as the conurbation. Badger Vectis also operated cross-linked services to differentiate itself with Wilts & Dorset's routes.

After just a week, Wilts & Dorset retaliated by setting up a high-frequency sub-brand of its own, called Skippers, initially using conventional buses, but from November, using brand new MCW Metrorider minibuses. The competition saw the Poole to Bournemouth corridor eventually served by a total of 18 buses an hour.

Badger Vectis did not operate into Poole bus station however, which was described as a major problem. Other issues for the company which emerged were reliability problems with its older Bristol REs, as well as recruitment issues, and the relatively higher cost of crew operation. Despite their garage rental arrangement, by the beginning of March 1988, Badger Vectis also began to compete directly with Yellow Buses, having previously avoided their routes.

== Cessation ==
The financial health of Badger Vectis declined due to its problems, and the retaliation by Wilts & Dorset. In a development described as an implosion, Badger Vectis gave notice to the traffic commissioner that it would stop operating in early May 1988. The company closed early however, on 29 March, after employees were told that the company would no longer be operating and were offered a deal not to speak to the press. The traffic commissioner then banned the Badger Vectis company from registering bus services ever again.

== Legacy ==
The bus war between Badger Vectis and Wilts & Dorset was described as a rare instance of post-deregulation competition between a large newcomer against an established operator, with the intention of complete elimination of the incumbent. This was in contrast to the norm which had been, and continued to be for some years afterward, characterised by small operators taking on large incumbents to take a share of their profitable routes in short term competition, and then either withdraw, fail, or be bought out by the incumbent. Industry insiders had at the time predicted however that in this case, by Christmas 1987 Badger Vectis had come very close to forcing Wilts & Dorset to cease operating entirely, had it continued with its own expansion in their territory.

Although Badger Vectis was a failure, Badgerline itself continued its aggressive strategy, and went on to form one of the largest private transport groups in the United Kingdom, FirstGroup in June 1995. Both Wilts & Dorset and Southern Vectis also continued to operate, ironically coming together under common ownership, both being acquired by the Go-Ahead Group, and now both operating as part of its Go South Coast division.
