= Elizabeth (bus) =

English steam bus, previously used in Whitby and Weston-super-Mare

GT2827 Elizabeth
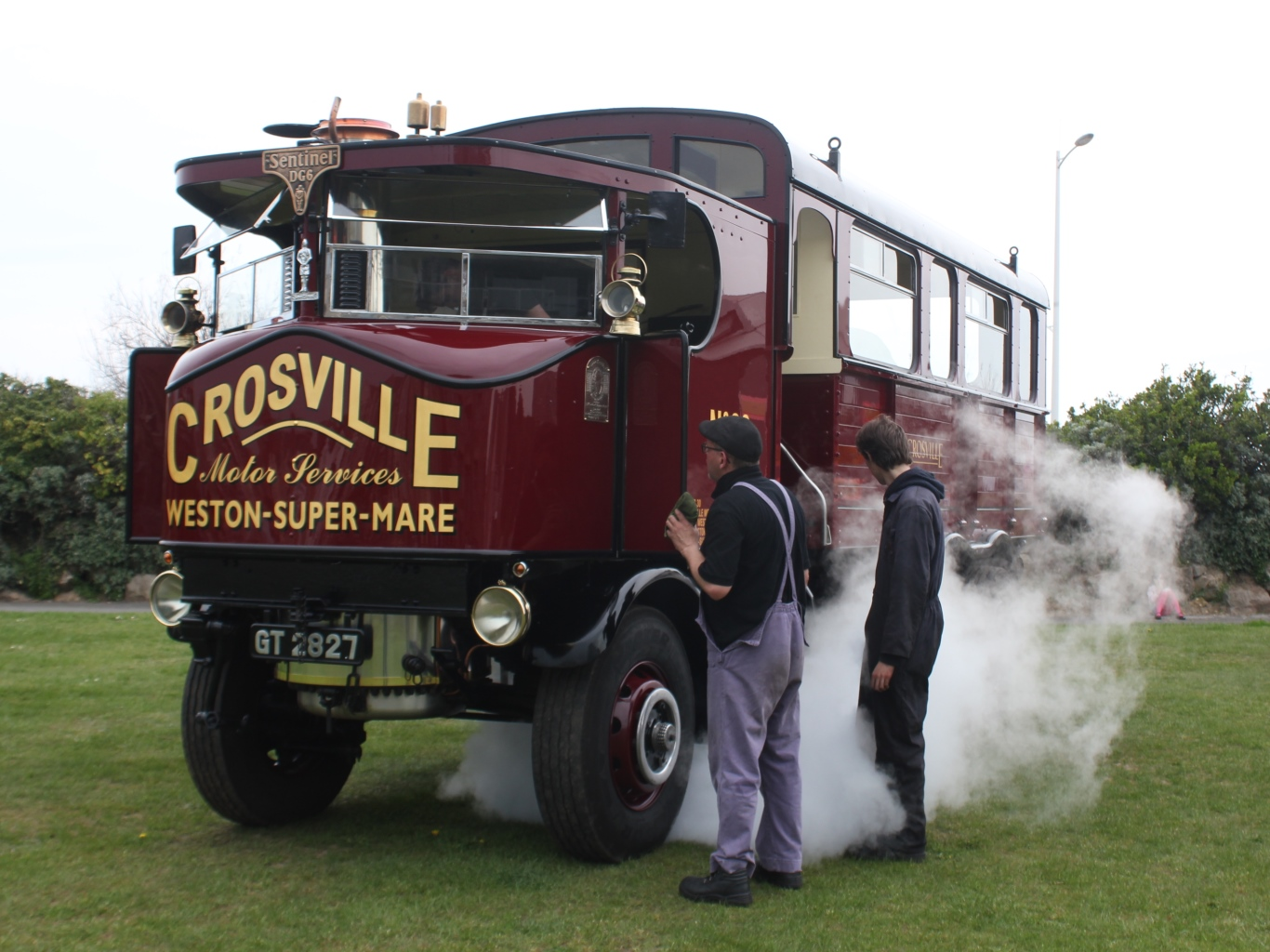
- Elizabeth on display in Weston-super-Mare in 2018

Overview
- Manufacturer: Sentinel (chassis, engine and cab); Northern Star Motor Carriage Company (coachwork)

Powertrain
- Engine: Steam
- Capacity: 30
- Transmission: Chain

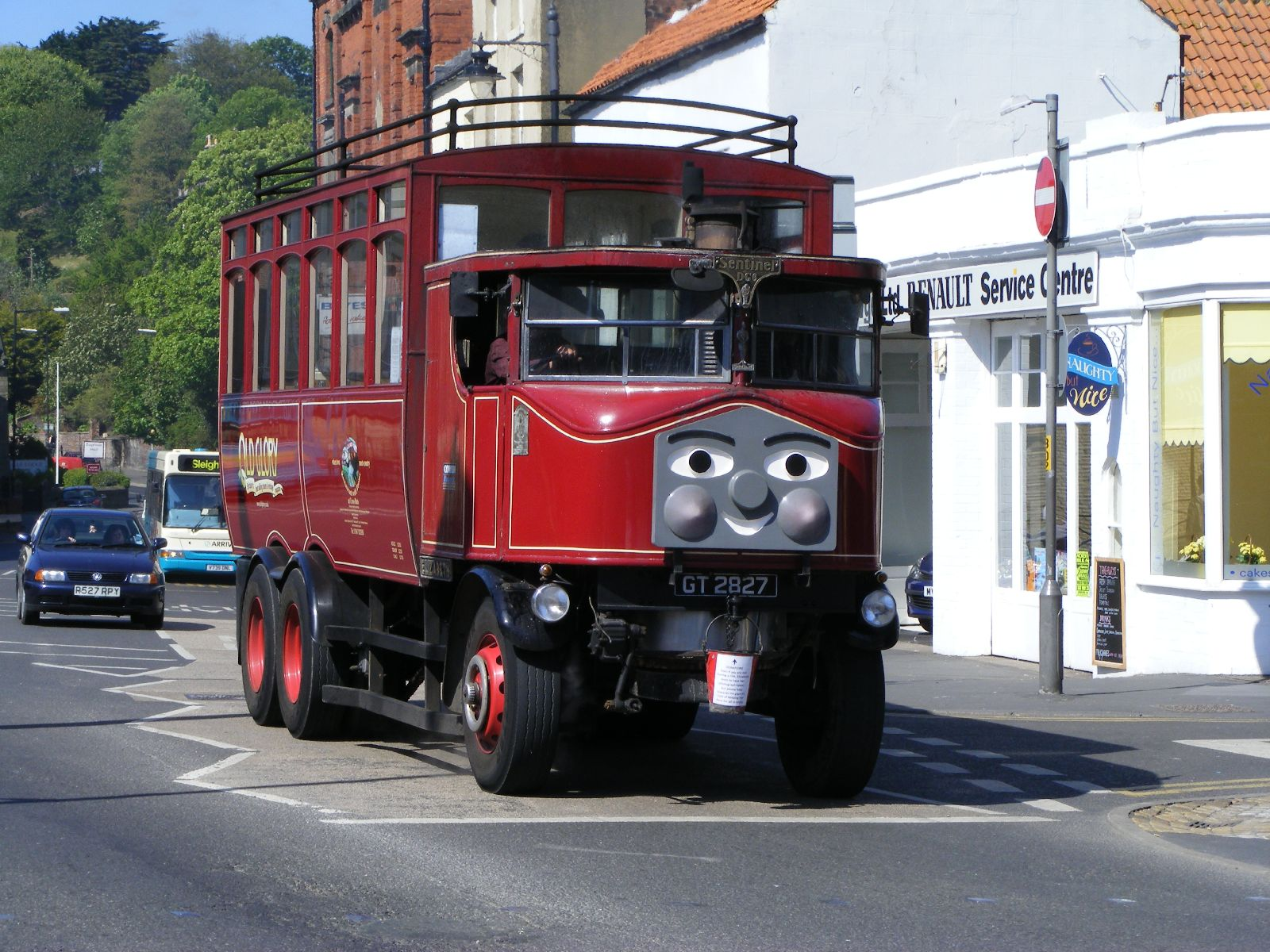
Elizabeth operating in Whitby in 2009

GT2827 Elizabeth is a steam powered combination bus that operated in the English seaside towns of Whitby (2005-2015) and Weston-super-Mare (2015-2018). It is now preserved in a private collection.

The vehicle was originally built in 1931 by Sentinel Waggon Works as a steam-powered DG6P flatbed lorry. It had, and still has, two gears, chain transmission, six wheels and ten pneumatic tyres. It was used a flatbed lorry, and then a tar sprayer, before being bought from a scrapyard for preservation in 1962. As a preserved lorry it had several owners before being bought, in 2002, by the Northern Star Motor Carriage Company. They converted it into a 30-seat bus, with a newly built body made from white ash and mahogany.

Before the bus could carry fare-paying passengers, it had to undergo a 35° tilt test and required an amendment to legislation since the exhaust was not sited at the rear of the vehicle. Together with the rebuild, this took until 2005. The bus was initially used by the Northern Star Motor Carriage Company to take people on a tour of Whitby, providing up to ten trips per day over the summer months. It was the only steam bus in revenue-earning service in the world and became a tourist attraction in its own right. (Note: Statutory Instrument 2005 No. 3128 The Public Service Vehicles (Conditions of Fitness, Equipment, Use and Certification) (Amendment) (No. 4) Regulations 2005)

In November 2011, Elizabeth took part in London's Lord Mayor's Show. The journey from Whitby to London was undertaken entirely under its own steam power.

In around April 2015 Elizabeth was purchased by Crosville, a public and heritage bus operator in Weston-super-Mare. Crosville ceased operating in 2018 and its operating licence was revoked. Elizabeth was retained by the former owner of Crosville, and is now in his private collection of vintage vehicles.
