= Badgerline =

British bus operating company

Badgerline Group

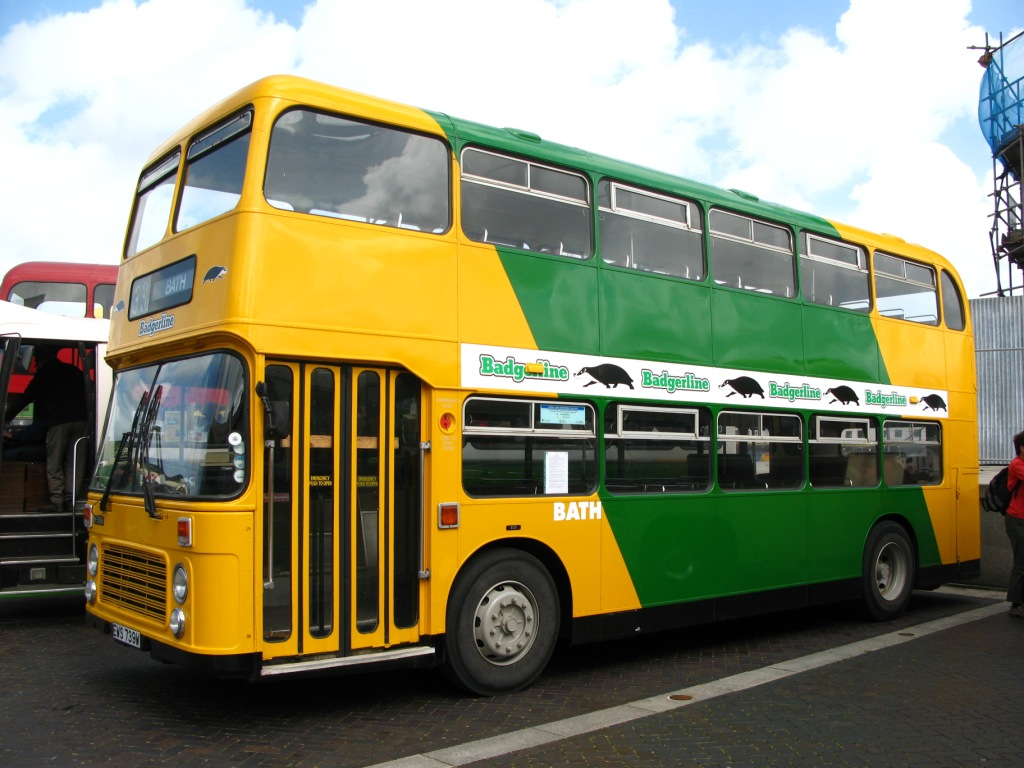
- Preserved Bristol VR in May 2011
- Founded: April 1985; 41 years ago
- Ceased operation: 16 June 1995; 30 years ago
- Headquarters: Weston-super-Mare
- Service area: England; Wales
- Service type: Bus
- Fleet: 4,000 (June 1995)
- Operator: Badgerline Buses; City Line; Eastern National; Frontline Enterprises; Midland Red West; Potteries Motor Traction; South Wales Transport; Thamesway Buses; Wessex Coaches; Western National; Yorkshire Rider

Badgerline was a bus operator in and around Bristol from 1985 until 2003. Its headquarters were in Weston-super-Mare. Initially a part of the Bristol Omnibus Company, it was privatised in September 1986 and sold to Badgerline Holdings in a management buyout. It went on to purchase a number of bus companies in England and Wales. In November 1993, Badgerline Group was listed on the stock exchange and, on 16 June 1995, it merged with the GRT Group to form FirstBus.

In 2018, Badgerline was reintroduced as the name for First West of England's bus services in and around Weston-super-Mare.

== History ==
=== 1906-1980 ===
The Bristol Tramways Company started operating buses in 1906 to feed traffic into their tram services from beyond the boundaries of the city of Bristol. In 1910 a branch was opened in Weston-super-Mare where the company's first bus station was opened on the sea front in the 1930s. Others were built after World War II at Wells, Bath and Bristol. The company changed its name to the Bristol Omnibus Company in 1957 as it no longer operated trams, but by then it was owned by the British Transport Commission and so became a subsidiary of the National Bus Company (NBC) on 1 January 1969.

=== 1980-1985 ===
In the 1980s the NBC split its subsidiaries into smaller operating units. Bristol Omnibus established a separate operating unit for its services outside Bristol in September 1983 and then introduced three distinct brands in April 1985, with operations in Somerset and the Avon outside the city of Bristol becoming Badgerline.

=== 1986-1990 ===
Badgerline was established as a company in its own right and sold to a group of its managers and staff on 23 September 1986. This was the second bus-operating NBC subsidiary to be sold.

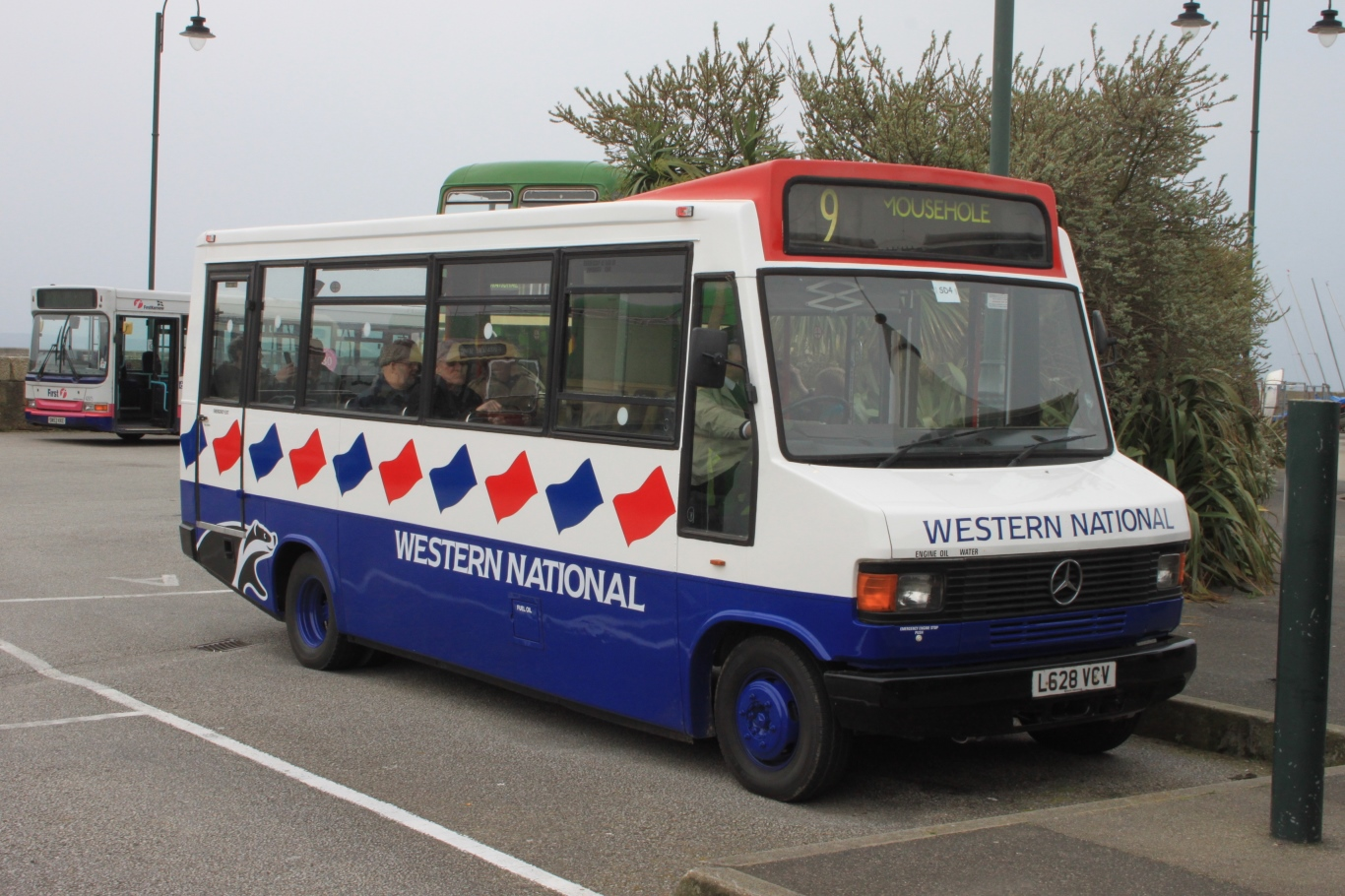
The badger seen behind the rear wheel shows Western National to be part of Badgerline Holdings. It is a preserved Plaxton Beaver bodied Mercedes-Benz 709D in Penzance in April 2014

In December 1986, six of the company's managers and 90 other staff formed Badgerline Holdings as a limited company to purchase Badgerline from NBC. Employees held 95% of Badgerline's share capital. It went on to buy two travel agencies, Roman City of Bath, and NBC subsidiary National Travelworld. On 7 August 1987 Western National, which operated in Plymouth and Cornwall, was sold by NBC to Plympton Coachlines with Badgerline Holdings having an initial 39% shareholding, which was increased to 66% in August 1988.

In April 1988, Badgerline Holdings purchased Midland Red West Holdings, another ex-NBC employee buy-out that had purchased Bristol Omnibus in September 1987, and continued to operate city services in Bristol. Because of this the company was referred to the Monopolies & Mergers Commission who reported in March 1989 on concerns regarding the ownership by a single company of the two principal bus operators in Avon. Ensuing discussions led to the company giving two undertakings:

1. it would not seek to re-register any services that had been lost
2. tenders for subsidised routes would be done fairly and scrutinised by an auditor.

The company created three subsidiaries in 1987 in an attempt to expand into new operating areas, none of which lasted more than a year. It sold its share in Red Admiral to Southampton Citybus but their operations in Poole and Salisbury lost £962,000.

- Badgerline South operated 21 Iveco and 12 Ford Transit minibuses in Salisbury.
- Badger Vectis operated in Bournemouth and Poole as a joint venture with Southern Vectis using 7 Iveco minibuses and 16 single deck buses, mostly Bristol REs.
- Red Admiral operated in Portsmouth as a joint venture with Southampton Citybus.

=== 1990-1995 ===
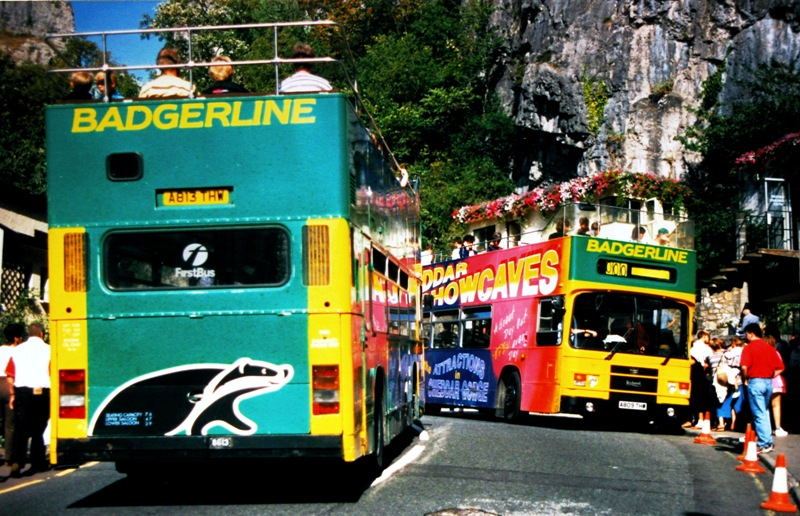
Badgerline buses in Cheddar in 1995, showing First Bus branding on the rear window.

The company expanded into South Wales and Essex and then floated on the stock exchange as the Badgerline Group in November 1993, followed by acquisition of Potteries Motor Traction and Yorkshire Rider in 1994.

Badgerline Group had also unsuccessfully promoted guided buses and articulated buses as solutions to Bristol's transport problems in the 1990s.

The Badgerline Group merged with GRT Group to form FirstBus on 16 June 1995. Badgerline Group contributed 4,000 buses to the new company's fleet of 5,600. The operating subsidiaries transferred to FirstBus were:

- Badgerline Buses
- Bristol Omnibus Company (trading as City Line)
- Eastern National
- Frontline Enterprises
- Midland Red West (including Midland Red Coaches)
- Potteries Motor Traction (including Pennine Blue, Red Rider and Crosville Motor Services)
- South Wales Transport
- Thamesway Buses
- Wessex Coaches
- Western National
- Yorkshire Rider

On 16 June 1995, Badgerline Buses became a subsidiary of the new FirstBus.

=== 1996-2003 ===
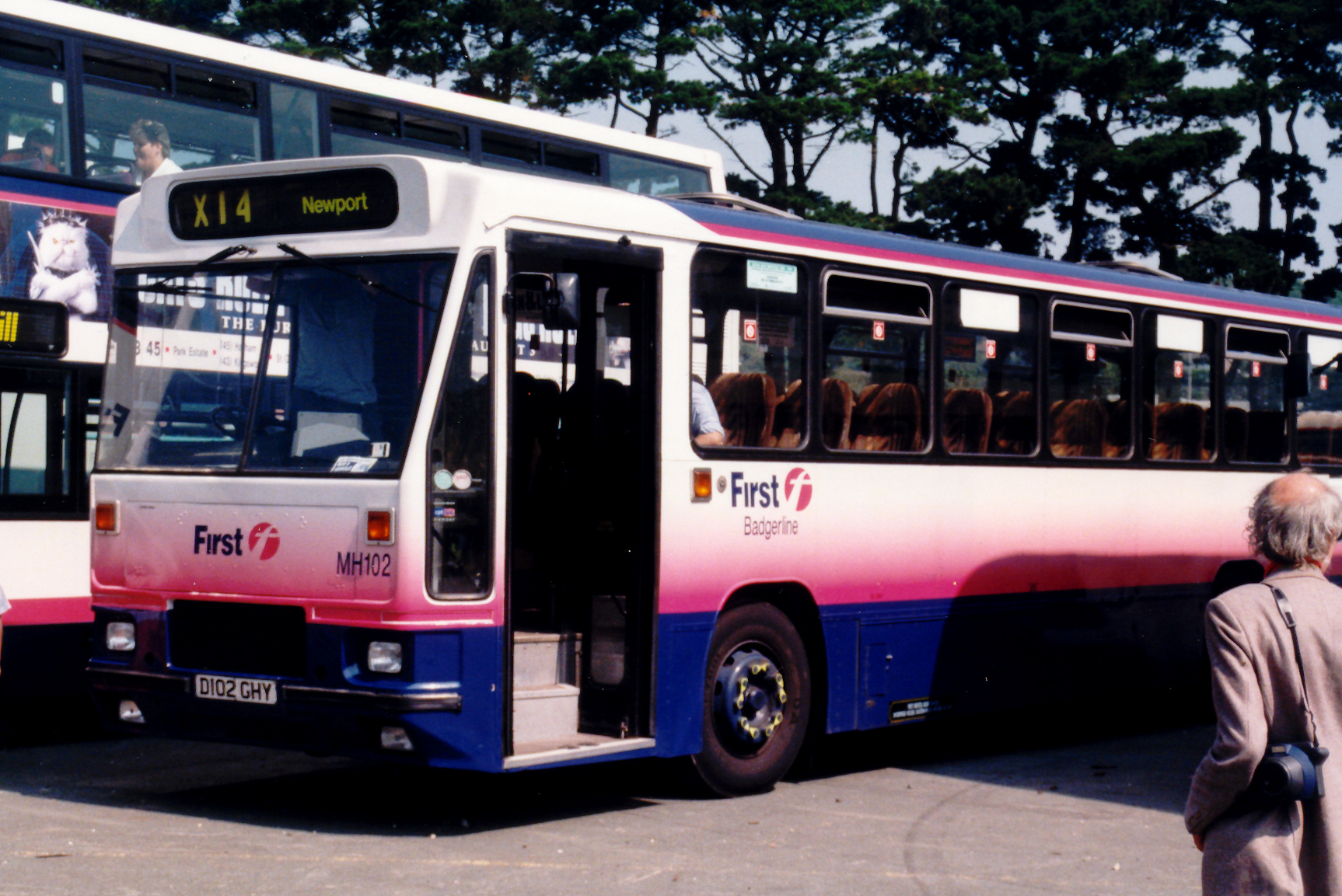
A First Badgerline branded bus seen in 2001, in First corporate livery.

In 1996, Badgerline, as part of First Group, was merged back into Bristol Omnibus, although Badgerline was retained as a trading name. In July 1997 the Streamline operation in Bath was purchased by FirstGroup and merged with Badgerline, although the Streamline name was retained for a while. It had started as a taxi company but expanded into minibus services. At the time of takeover it had 20 buses, three of which were full size single deck buses.

Bristol Omnibus was renamed First Bristol in 1999 but Badgerline was managed independently again from 2000.

First Somerset & Avon was created on 30 May 2003 to combine the operations of both Badgerline and Southern National under the First brand. In April 2017, following a reorganisation, First Somerset & Avon was combined with First Bristol to become First West of England.

=== 2018-Present ===
Badgerline (First West of England)
- Parent: First West of England
- Founded: August 2018
- Headquarters: Weston-super-Mare
- Service area: North Somerset
- Service type: Bus

In August 2018 First West of England relaunched their services in Weston-super-Mare as Badgerline, together with a new logo and take on the classic Badgerline livery. This followed the closure of Weston-super-Mare based Crosville Motor Services in April 2018. All 16 buses allocated to the depot for town services were repainted.

== Area of operation ==
Badgerline's headquarters were in Weston-super-Mare. Bus services extended as far as Chippenham, Calne, Gloucester, Salisbury, Taunton and Yeovil but it also operated National Express services to destinations such as London. Vehicles were maintained at four depots: Bath, Bristol, Wells and Weston-super-Mare. The allocations on 1 January 1986 and 30 November 1989 were:

Depot	1986	1989
Bath	119	184
Bristol	113	128
Wells	22	25
Weston	88	104

== Fleet ==
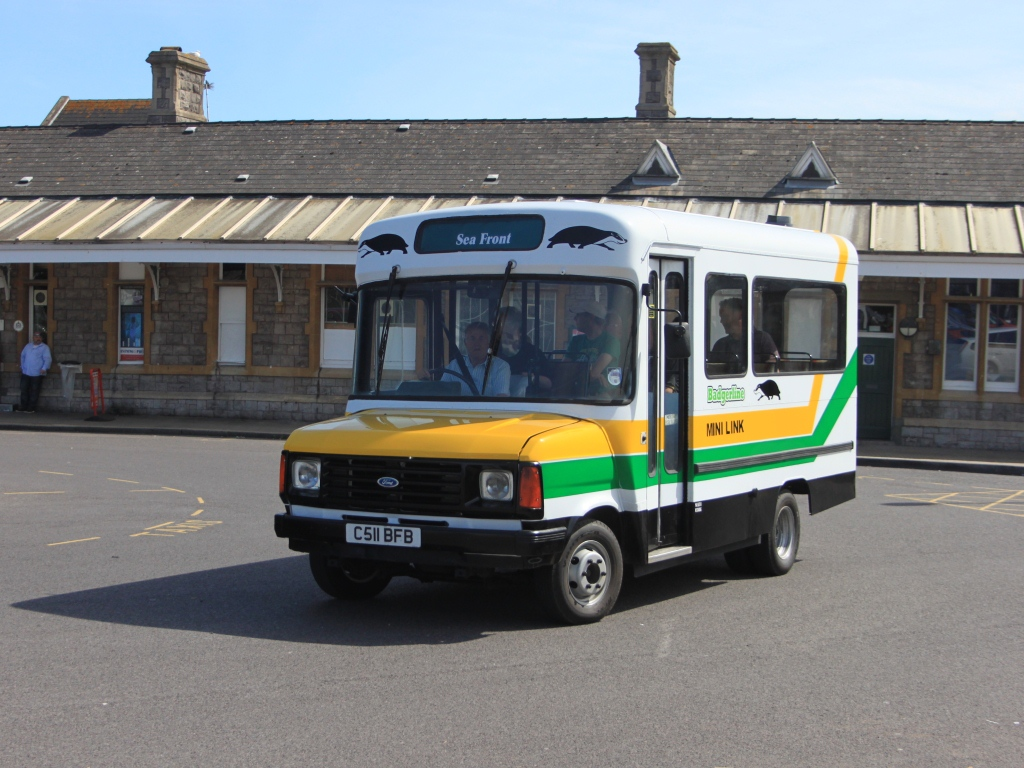
Preserved Ford Transit minibus at Weston-super-Mare station in August 2012

The first years of operation saw the delivery of three different models of minibuses, Ford Transits, Freight Rover Sherpas and Iveco Dailys. The first 36 new full-size buses were all from the Volvo B10M range and consisted of 12 Alexander-bodied double-decker Citybuses, 14 Alexander-bodied single deckers and 10 Van Hool-bodied coaches. These entered service, mainly at Weston-super-Mare, in May 1987. The following year saw the introduction of 24 Optare StarRider midibuses. These were followed by 10 Leyland Olympians for Bath.

On 31 May 1985 46 Ford Transit minibuses replaced 18 full-size buses at Weston-super-Mare, the first English town network to be totally converted to minibus operation. Most routes operated at a 10-minute headway during the daytime, with routes combining to give 5-minute headways through the town centre. Headways reduced to 20 minutes in the evening and on Sundays. Full-size vehicles were retained in the town for longer distance services. The town's bus station was closed in 1987 when maintenance facilities were transferred to a new depot in Warne Road.

Badgerline was operating 342 buses on 1 January 1986 but this had increased to 441 by 30 November 1989.

Type	1986	1989
Mini- and midi-buses	69	196
Single deck buses	141	97
Double deck buses	89	108
Single deck coaches	42	40
Double deck coaches	1	0

== Liveries and brands ==
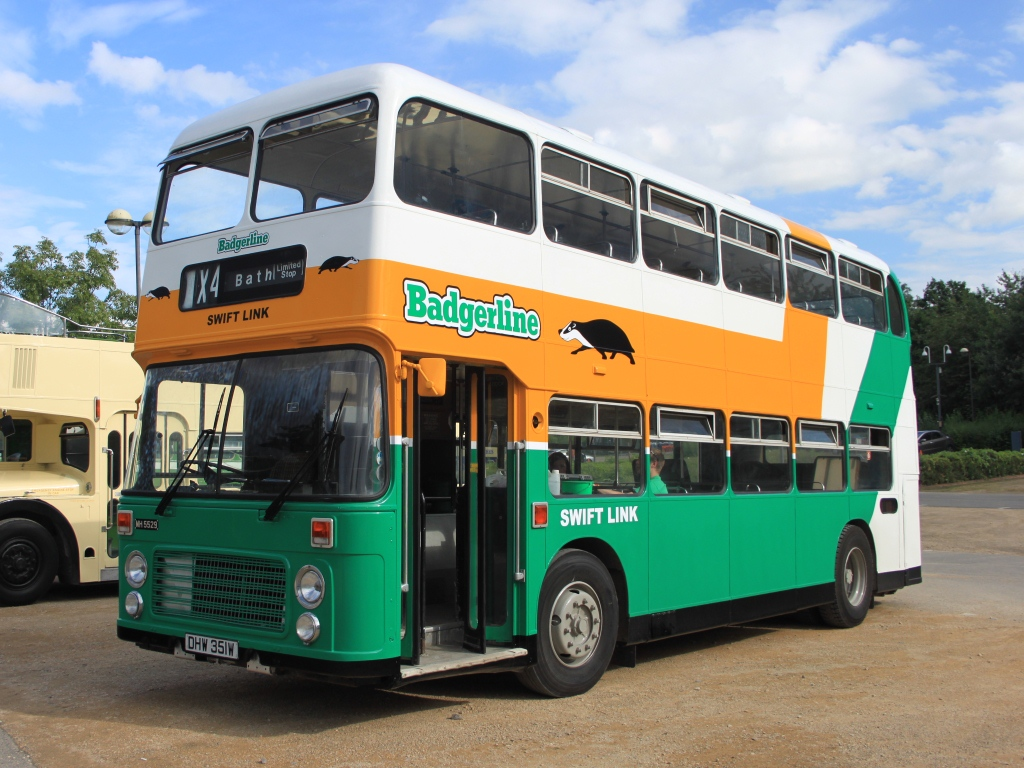
Preserved Bristol VRT in Swift Link livery in August 2012

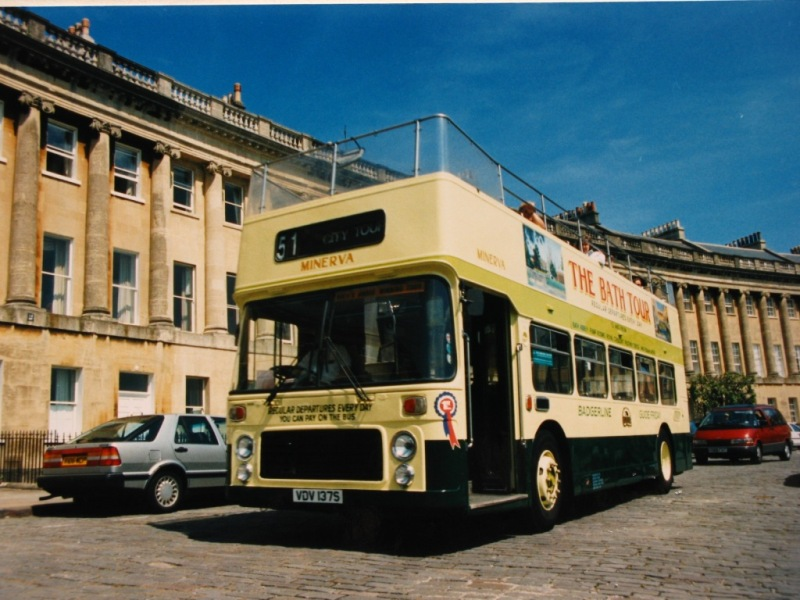
Eastern Coach Works bodied Bristol VRT open top bus in joint Guide Friday livery in Bath

The livery established in 1985 was yellow with a broad diagonal green panel on each side (about a third of the vehicle) sweeping up and forward. The name was in green serif letters, repeating along a white band above the lower deck windows (at roof level on single deck buses) interspersed with a badger logo. Some vehicles carried a white livery with one band each of yellow and green, horizontal along most of the side but up swept at the rear. These were branded for specific services: minibuses were being branded 'Mini Link' and buses with coach seats 'Swift Link', although this brand was soon dropped as it was difficult to always roster branded vehicles to Swift Link routes. Coaches that were not in Roman City, National Express or National Holidays livery were painted white, yellow and green in broad diagonal panels but these sloped backwards, opposite to ordinary buses. Open top vehicles in Bath carried Roman City livery for a while but were then changed to primrose yellow with olive and Brunswick green bands with both Badgerline and Guide Friday logos.

A revised livery was introduced for minibuses in 1991. This was plain green and with a larger badger logo and the company name in yellow serif lettering. Shortly afterwards the larger buses started to appear with the new logo and lettering style on a large green area in the centre of the body, either side of which was a yellow area that was angled up and backwards (opposite to the previous scheme).

FirstBus livery began to appear on Badgerline vehicles in March 1998. In line with company policy this was initially only carried by new vehicles that were built to a high specification. The first of these were Wright Renown bodied Volvo B10BLEs, new for express service X39 between Bristol and Bath, and Wells based routes 173 (to Bath), and 376/377 (to Bristol and Yeovil).
