= Hebble =

Hebble may refer to

- River Hebble, a river in West Yorkshire, England
- Hebble Motor Services, a defunct bus company which operated in Halifax, West Yorkshire, England
- Robert Hebble (1934–2020), American composer
- SS Hebble (1891), a British freight vessel
