= Samuel Ledgard =

British businessman (1874–1952)

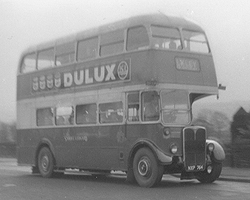
AEC Regent III NXP764 in Samuel Ledgard livery

Samuel Ledgard (1874–1952) was a Leeds entrepreneur who became a major West Yorkshire Independent bus operator. Following his death in 1952, his executors continued to operate the Samuel Ledgard bus company until 1967, when it was acquired by the West Yorkshire Road Car Company.

== History ==
=== 1874–1952 ===
Samuel Ledgard was born in Leeds in 1874. His business empire started in 1897 when he became the licensee of the Nelson Hotel in Armley, Leeds. He also owned a brewery and bottling plant, located behind The Nelson and bottled bulk Guinness and Bass. In expanding this business he provided outside catering at race meetings and local shows, and initially used a horse-and-cart to support this enterprise. This led him to further expand into the haulage business - initially with his horses, then, in 1906, with a steam lorry. In 1912, he bought a Karrier petrol-engined lorry, registered U1949. He then bought an interchangeable charabanc body, manufactured by William Nicholson of Otley, to be fitted to his lorry for carrying passengers at weekends, when there was little haulage work. In 1913, he took over Bridge Garage, in Leeds, to service and repair his own, and others, vehicles. His other businesses included cattle dealing and farming, quarrying and gravel extraction. He also bought property around his hotel, which eventually provided space for his bus garage.

His move into bus services was in 1924, with a Horsforth to Leeds service. He expanded both organically and by taking over a number of other bus companies, from 1924 to 1943, by which time Samuel Ledgard buses were well established, operating from the main depot in Armley, and from other depots in Otley, Yeadon, Ilkley and Bradford.

The Ledgard fleet was predominantly Leyland and the last buses ordered by Samuel Ledgard were three Leyland Titan PD2/12s. These entered service a mere month before he died in April 1952.

=== 1952–1967 ===
Samuel Ledgard's estate totalled £129,491. As the company was still owned by him, it formed part of his personal assets. The then, punitive death duties amounted to £29,883, which threatened the continuance of the business and meant that, when looking to update the fleet, the executors had to look to the second-hand market. This strategy resulted a wide range of vehicles from various manufacturers entering service, including buses from: AEC, Albion, Bristol, Daimler and Leyland. A significant influx was 23 ex London Transport Executive 'austerity' Daimler CWA6's with Park Royal bodywork in 1953/54, 22 of which went into service unmodified, save for platform doors being fitted. They gave stirling service until the last one was withdrawn in 1962. However, one notable exception to the second-hand purchases, was six new AEC Regent V buses with Roe bodywork which were delivered in 1957. One of these buses was registered 1949U - a reversal of the registration on Samuel's first petrol lorry, in 1912.

In an attempt to standardise such a diverse fleet, 1963 saw the first of many ex-London Transport RT-type AEC Regent III buses being purchased. Over the next four and a half years, 34 of these vehicles entered the Ledgard fleet.

In August 1967, it was announced that West Yorkshire Road Car Company would acquire the Ledgard business. The date for this was set to be midnight on 14 October 1967. Whilst Ledgard's staff were offered employment with West Yorkshire, only 14 of over 100 Ledgard vehicles acquired by West Yorkshire entered service, ten AEC Regent Vs and two Daimler CVG6s, plus two Duple bodied Ford coaches. By 1970, even these vehicles had been sold.

=== The present day ===
An active enthusiasts society (the Samuel Ledgard Society was formed in 1998. The society holds an annual reunion, social events and publishes a quarterly magazine: The Ledgard Chat. The magazine is now published three times per year, in April, August and December, from the beginning of 2020.

The building which was the Nelson Hotel survives, and bears a blue plaque in Samuel Ledgard's memory. In August 1979, a road in Leeds was named Ledgard Way. The Otley depot building is still in existence and is now used by a tyre-fitting company.
