= Steam bus =

Bus powered by a steam engine

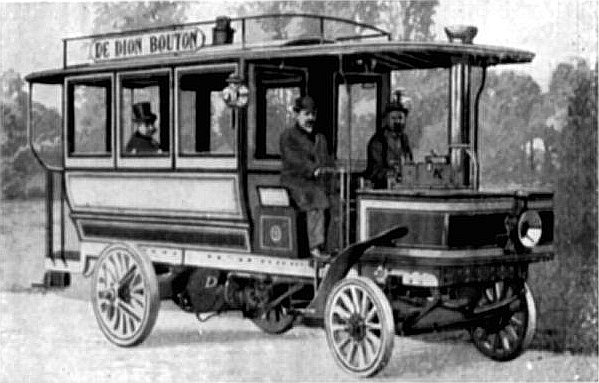
French steam bus

A steam bus is a bus powered by a steam engine. Early steam-powered vehicles designed for carrying passengers were more usually known as steam carriages, although this term was sometimes used to describe other early experimental vehicles too.

== History ==
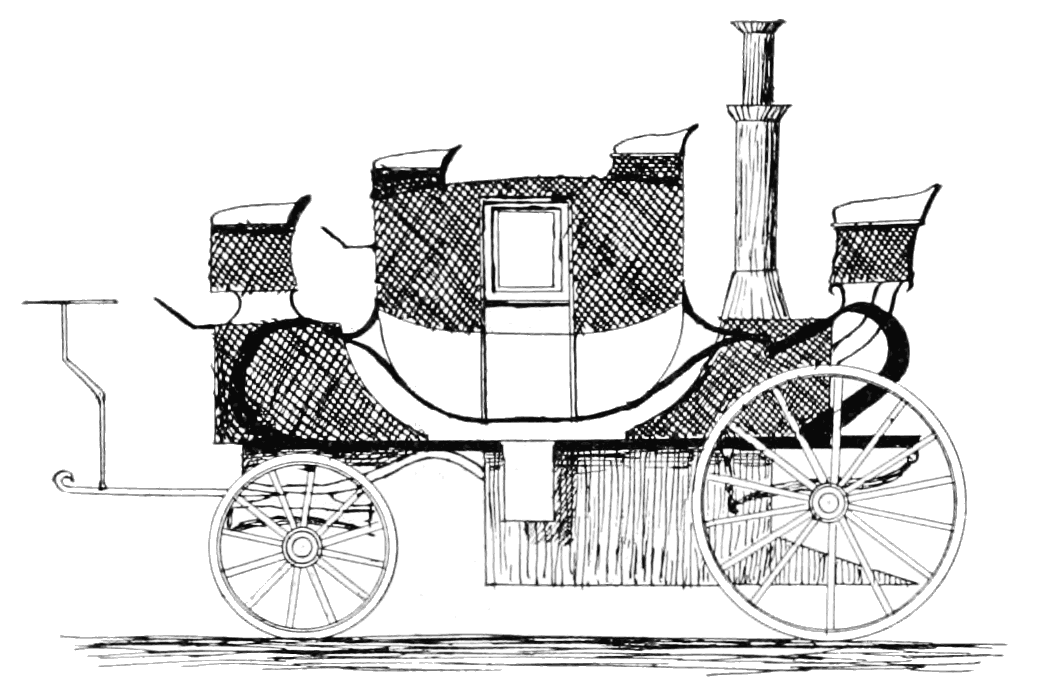
John Scott Russell's Steam carriage in 1834

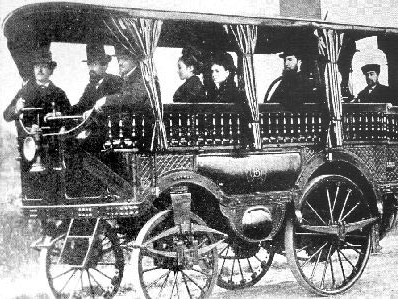
Amédée Bollée's L'Obéissante steam bus photographed in 1875

=== 1830-1895 ===
Regular intercity bus services by steam-powered buses were pioneered in England in the 1830s by associates of Sir Goldsworthy Gurney and by Walter Hancock among others, running reliable services over road conditions which were too hazardous for horse-drawn transportation. Steam carriages were much less likely to overturn, and did not "run away with" the customer as horses sometimes did. They travelled faster than horse-drawn carriages (24 mph or 39 km/h over four miles or 6.4 kilometres and an average of 12 mph or 19 km/h over longer distances). They could run at a half to a third of the cost of horse-drawn carriages. Their brakes did not lock and drag like horse-drawn transport (a phenomenon that increased damage to roads). According to engineers, steam carriages caused one-third the damage to the road surface as that caused by the action of horses' feet. Indeed, the wide tires of the steam carriages (designed for better traction) caused virtually no damage to the streets, whereas the narrow wheels of the horse-drawn carriages (designed to reduce the effort required of horses) tended to cause rutting.

However, the heavy road tolls imposed by the Turnpike Acts discouraged steam road vehicles and left the way clear for the horse-drawn omnibus companies, and from 1861 onwards, harsh legislation virtually eliminated mechanically propelled vehicles altogether from the roads of Great Britain for 30 years, the Locomotive Act 1861 imposing restrictive speed limits on "road locomotives" of 5 mph (8.0 km/h) in towns and cities, and 10 mph (16 km/h) in the country.

The Locomotives Act 1865 (the famous Red Flag Act) further reduced the speed limits to 4 mph (6.4 km/h) in the country and just 2 mph (3.2 km/h) in towns and cities, additionally requiring a man bearing a red flag to precede every vehicle. At the same time, the act gave local authorities the power to specify the hours during which any such vehicle might use the roads. The sole exceptions were street trams which from 1879 onwards were authorised under licence from the Board of Trade.

In 1881, the engineer John Inshaw built a steam carriage for use in Aston, Birmingham, UK. Capable of carrying ten people at speeds of up to 12 mph, Inshaw discontinued his experiments due to the legislation then in force.

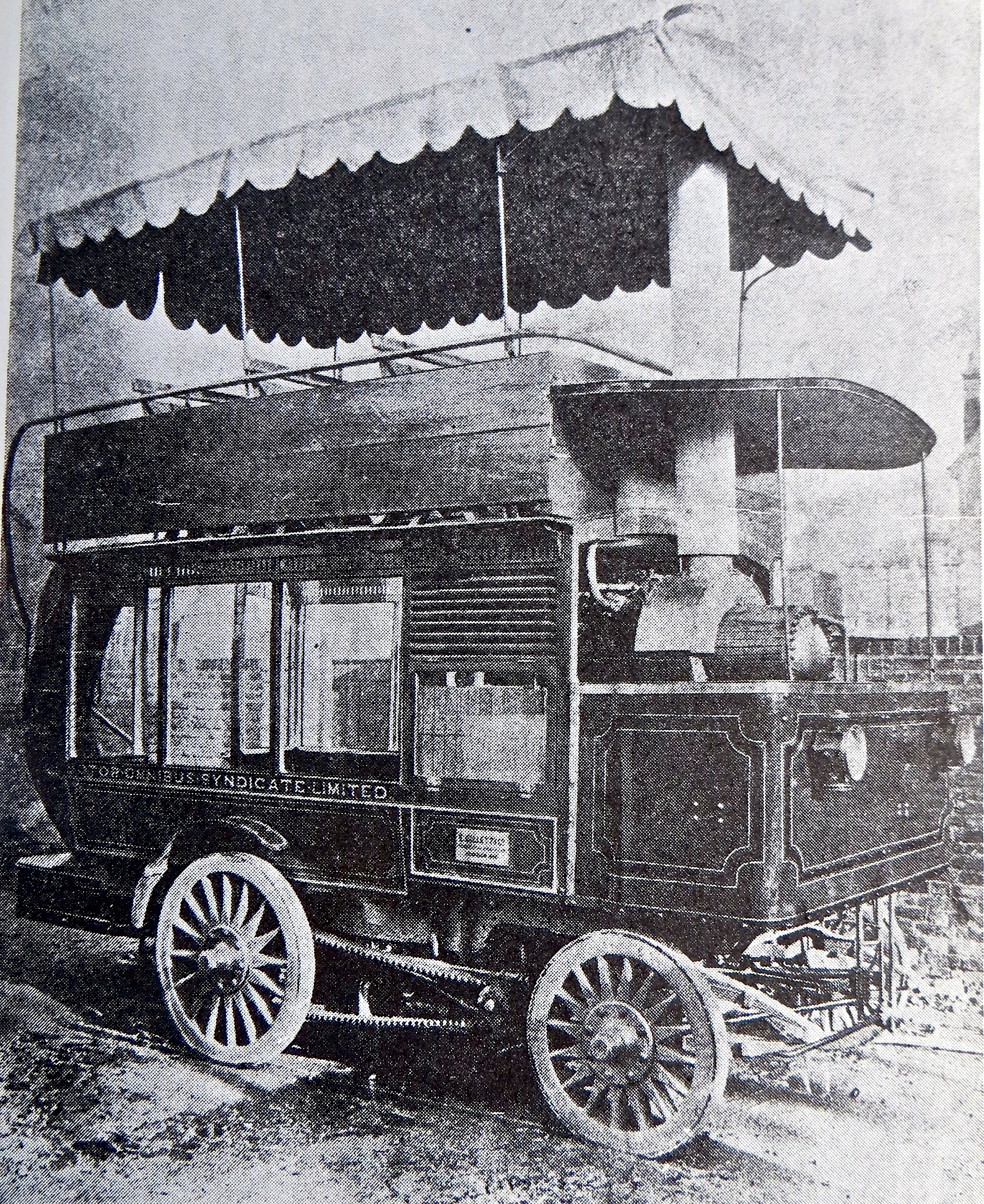
Gillett & Co Steam bus licensed by the Metropolitan Police on 21 Jan 1899

=== 1896-1923 ===
The Red Flag Act was repealed in 1896, and experimental steam buses again operated in various places the United Kingdom and around the empire.

Liquid Fuel Engineering Co. (Lifu) of Cowes built steam buses from 1897 to 1901. Lifu buses ran at Mansfield from 1 July 1898, between Dover and Deal in 1899, Fairford and Cirencester for the Midland and South Western Junction Railway in 1898 and 1899.

In 1899 a 24-seat (14 on top) bus of E. Gillett & Co (Hounslow) was licensed, but ran no regular service.

Straker buses were run by Potteries Electric Traction from 1901.

London Road car Co ran a Hammersmith-Shepherd's Bush-Oxford Circus route with a Thornycroft 36 seater (12 inside) in 1902.

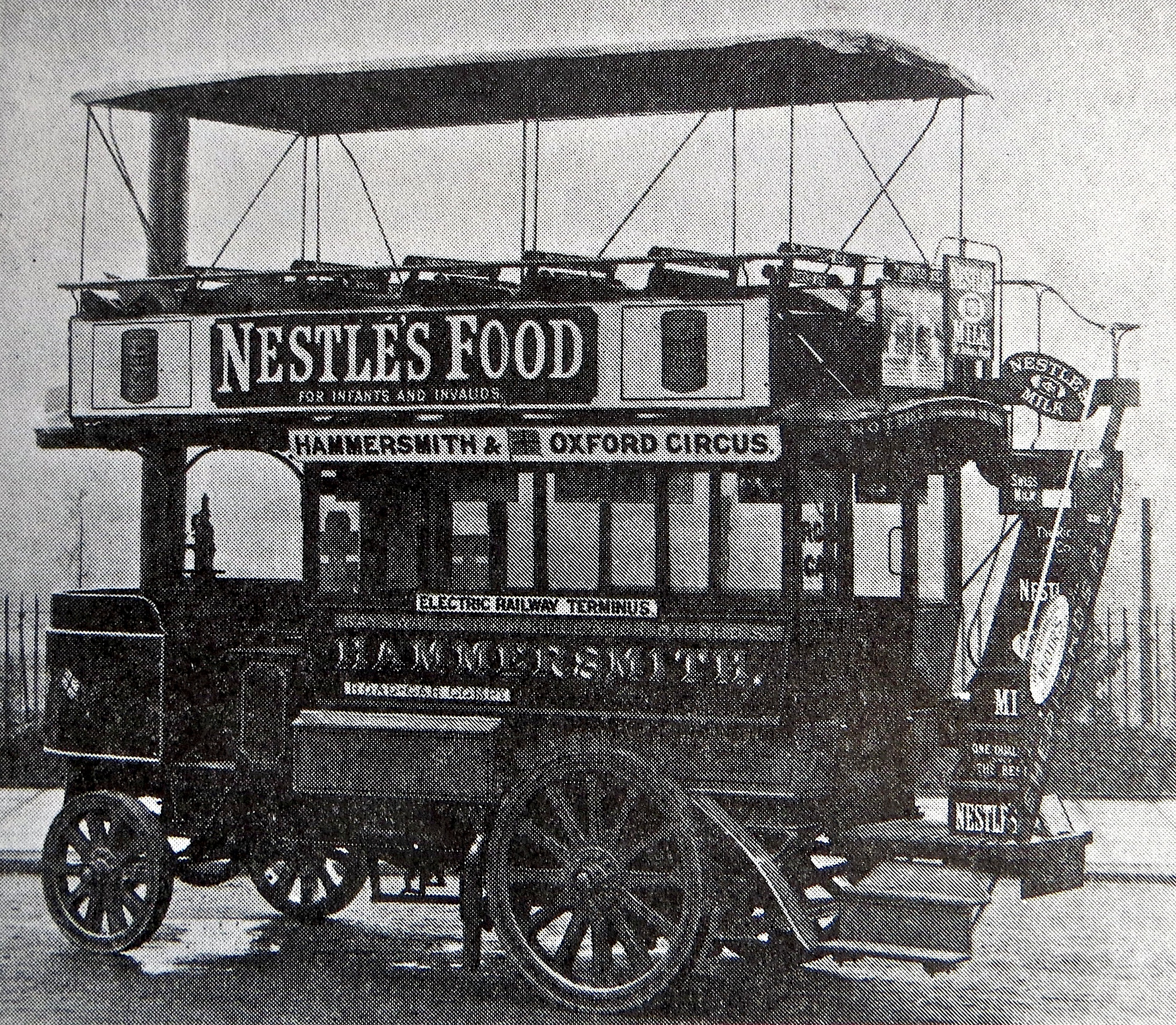
1902 Thornycroft Steam bus used by London Road car Co Ltd

Thomas Clarkson produced steam buses at Moulsham Works, Chelmsford and exhibited at 1903 and 1905 Motor Shows.

Torquay had steam buses from 1903 to 1923. In May 1903 a Chelmsford steam bus demonstration resulted in the formation of the Torquay & District Motor Omnibus Co Ltd on 23 July 1903. The company's prospectus said, "The Chelmsford motor omnibuses are steam propelled, and, what is of importance in a town of the character of Torquay, are entirely free from smell, noise, and vibration." 3 single deck 14 seat (12 inside and 2 with the driver) Chelmsford steam buses were ordered in May, built in August, but got stuck in mud between Salisbury and Exeter and didn't start a Strand to Chelston service until 2 November. There were 2,828 passengers in the first week. 2 more steam buses arrived in January 1904 and 8 were working by Easter 1905, the last 3 being 20 seaters. They had two-cylinder horizontal engines, with tubular boilers, and a working pressure of 150 to 250psi. They averaged a gallon of paraffin for 3.8 miles. 1904 costs were under 8½d per mile, made up of lubricants 0.2d., wages and fuel 5d. and repairs, establishment, and other charges 3.3d. Fares were 1d. to 4d., with 15 minute frequencies on two routes, and half-hourly on the others. The company declared a 7½% dividend in its first year. All the Torquay buses were sold to Harrogate Road car company just before Torquay Tramways opened in April 1907, but the Torquay Road car Co took over the garage and bought 6 Chelmsfords, 3 from Vale of Llangollen, 2 from Eastbourne Corporation and 1 from Great Western Railway. The new company was liquidated on 24 December 1908 and 3 buses sold to Bargoed Motor Service Company in 1909. The Torquay-Chelston Steam Car Company Ltd was formed on 28 March 1911 and took over the 3 unsold Chelmsfords and a new 25 seater Clarkson type IV steam bus from August 1911. The steam buses were replaced by petrol in 1923, when Devon General started to compete on the Chelston route.

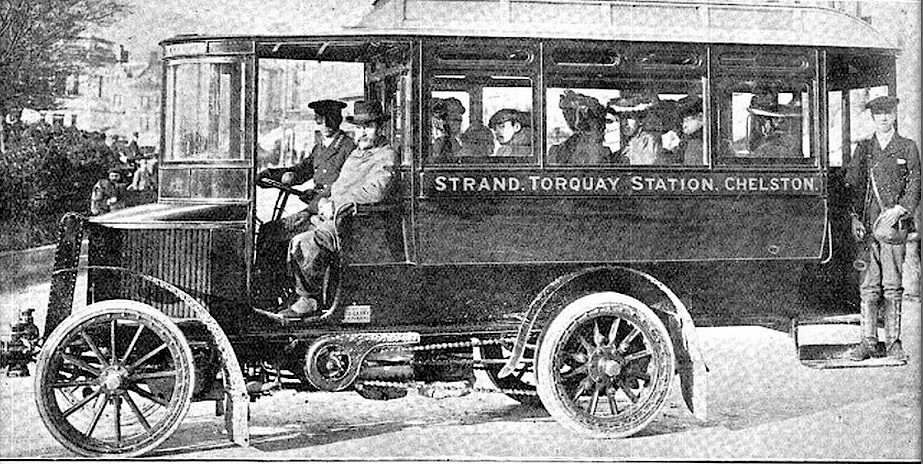
Torquay & District Motor Omnibus Co Ltd service to Chelston from 1903 with a 14-seat Chelmsford Steam bus

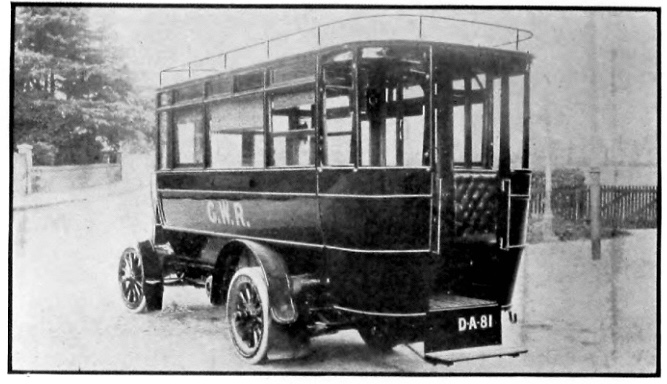
Chelmsford (1905)

In London Chelmsfords had mixed fortunes. Single-deck Chelmsfords were used by London General Omnibus Co and London Road-Car Co, but the last were withdrawn in 1905 because of heavy losses. However, double deck Chelmsfords with improved boilers were delivered to London Road-Car in 1905 and in 1909 National Steam Car Co. Ltd also started to run double deck Chelmsfords in London. By 1914 National Steam had 184, but post war replacements were petrol and its last steam bus ran in London on 18 November 1919.

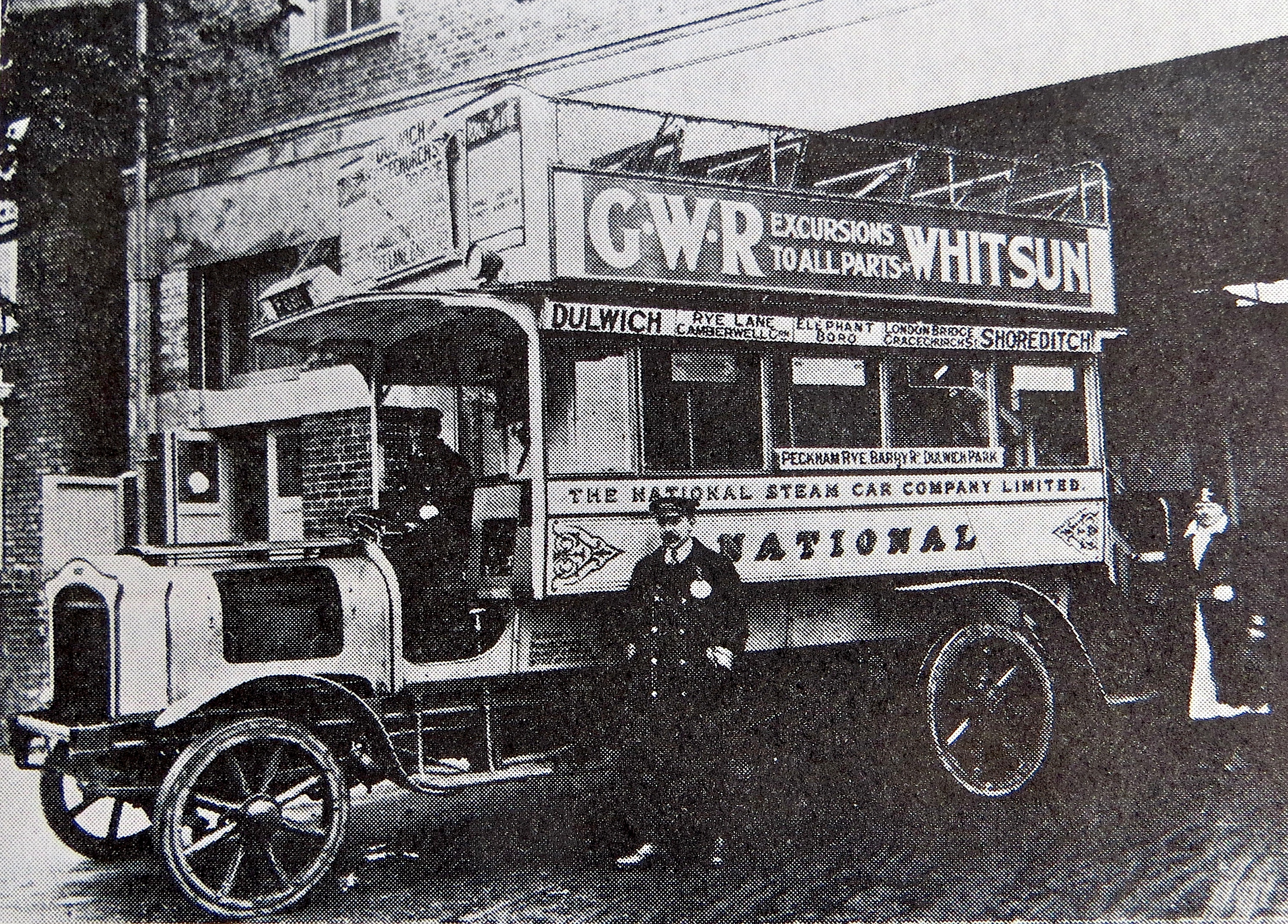
National Steam car Co Ltd ran steam buses in London from 2 Nov 1909 to 18 Nov 1919

Chelmsford buses reached many other places too, but weren't successful. Crewe to Nantwich had double deckers in 1905. London and South Western Railway ran them between Lyndhurst and Milford and Ambleside had 2. India was another destination. Four (or 6) Chelmsford chassis were imported by the New South Wales Railways in 1905. The bodies were constructed in Sydney and the vehicles placed in service on the streets of that city. Even further from their Chelmsford factory, two were imported for a Devonport-Takapuna service in 1904, but were unsuccessful and transferred to Hamilton in 1906. They probably failed to be profitable there too, as horses were again the motive power by 1910. Darracq-Serpollet steam buses were run by the Metropolitan Steam Omnibus Co Ltd from 5 October 1907 to 16 October 1912. When London General took over its main rivals on 1 July 1908 it had 1066 motor buses, 35 of them steam. A year later London General had abandoned steam.

=== 1924-present ===
Steam power for road transportation saw a modest revival in the 1920s. It was economical to use, with prices of fuel oil (such as kerosene) being about one-third that of gasoline, with comparable fuel consumption to contemporary gasoline-engined vehicles. Additionally, startup times vis-a-vis gasoline-powered vehicles and safety issues from vaporized fuel had been solved, with steam cars such as the Doble requiring a mere 40 seconds to start from cold. In 1931 Doble was employed as a consultant by A&G Price of Thames, New Zealand to construct a steam engine for buses. Four were built in 1931, but plans were shelved as the depression deepened and the Auckland bus was too heavy for the roads. However, two 1932 reports described progress with construction.

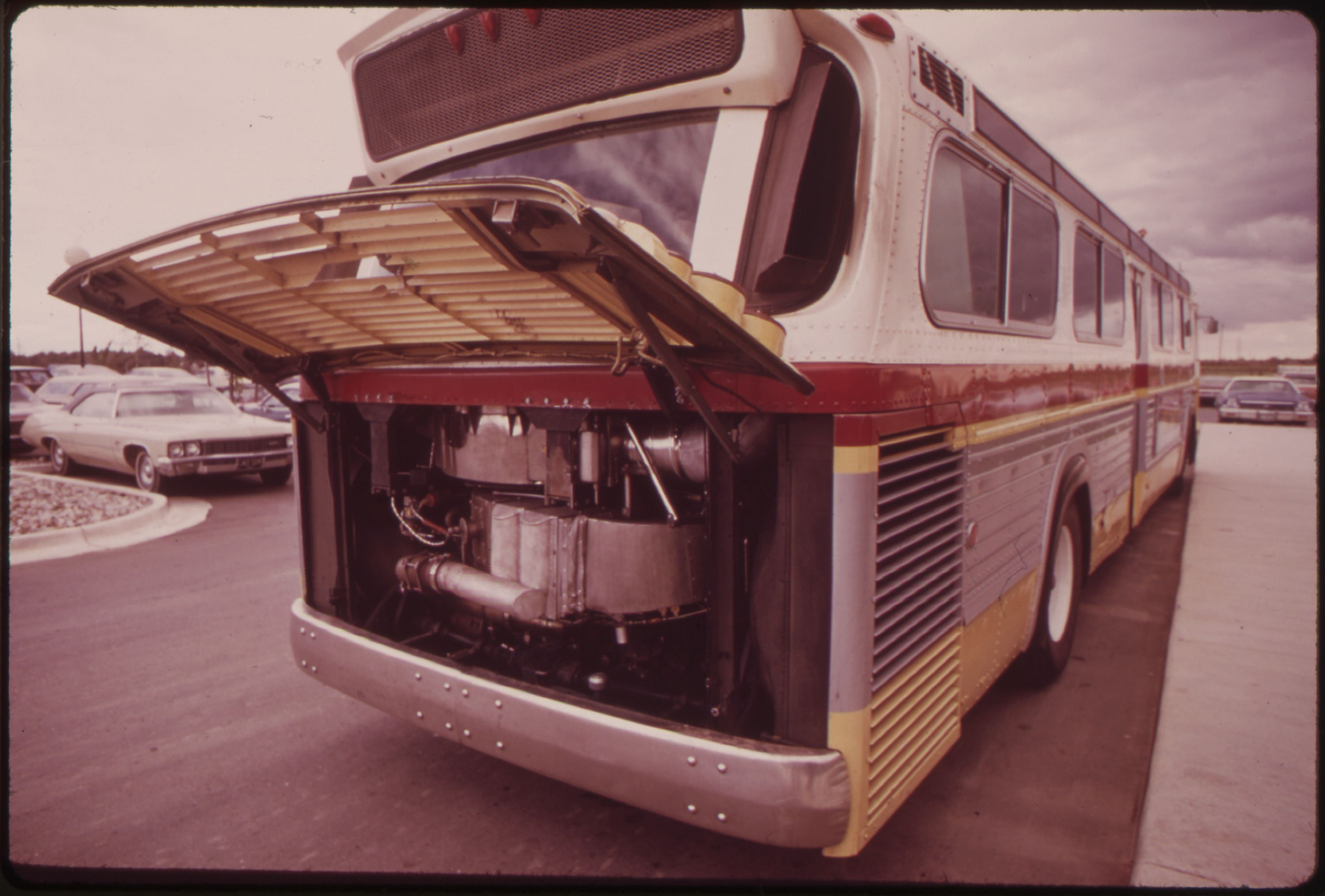
Lear Steam bus on display in Michigan in 1972

The Canadian company Brooks Steam Motors of Toronto, Ontario produced steam city buses in the 1920s. More recently, in 1972, the American inventor Bill Lear introduced a steam bus intended for trials in San Francisco.

== Modern commercial operations ==
A steam bus named Elizabeth operates in Weston Super Mare (originally in the English seaside town of Whitby).

AC Transit ran an experimental steam bus for a year.

== See also ==
- Brooks Steam Motors
- Goldsworthy Gurney
- Steam car
- Steam engine
- Steam wagon
- Walter Hancock
