= Eastern National Omnibus Company =

Former British bus operator

Eastern National

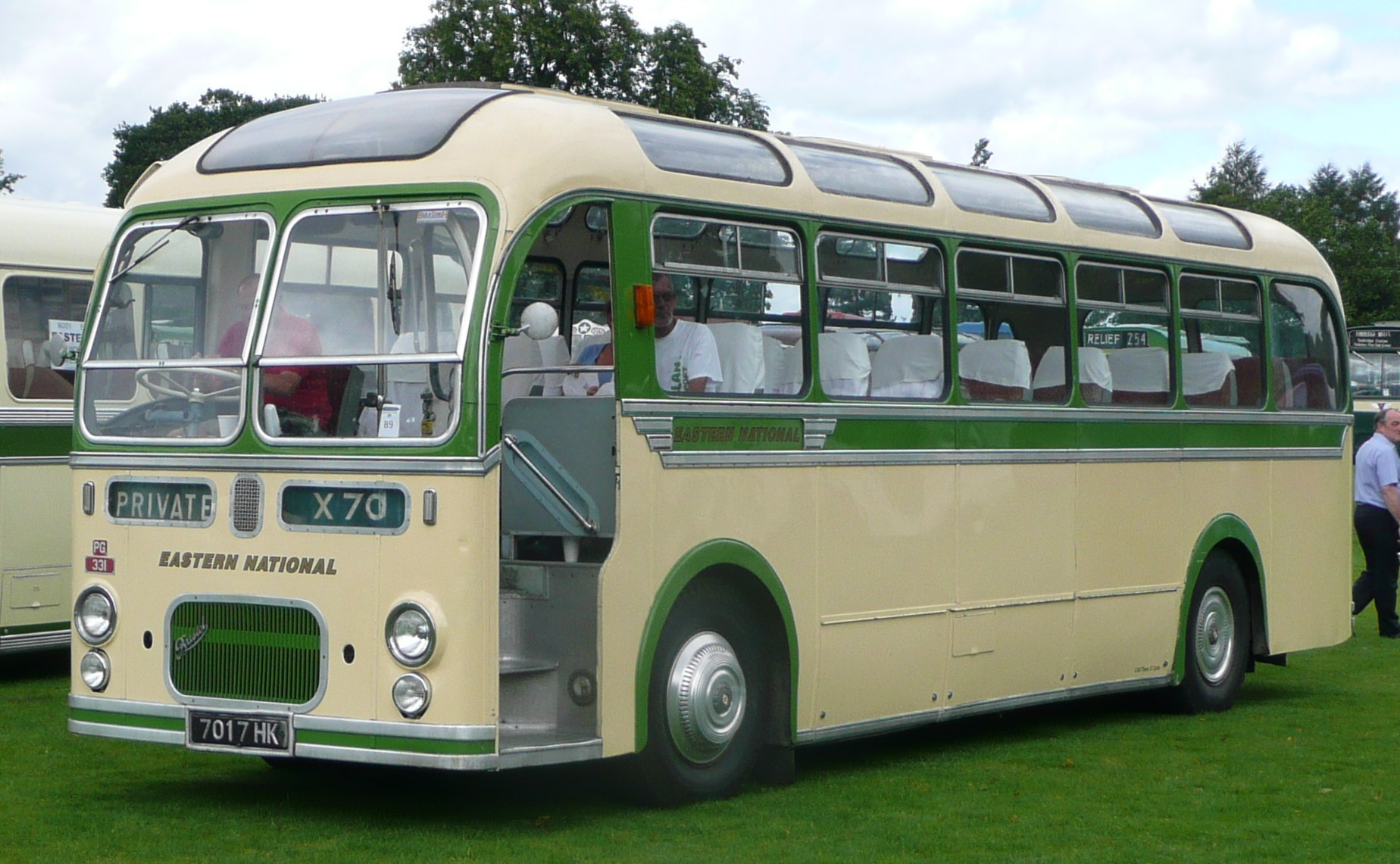
- Preserved ECW-bodied Bristol MW6G (July 2008)
- Parent: National Bus Company
- Founded: 28 February 1929
- Headquarters: New Writtle Street, Chelmsford
- Service area: Essex; Bedfordshire; Buckinghamshire; Hertfordshire; Huntingdonshire
- Service type: Bus operator

Eastern National was a bus company that operated in several home counties, primarily Essex, of southern England from 1929 to the 1990s.

== Early history ==
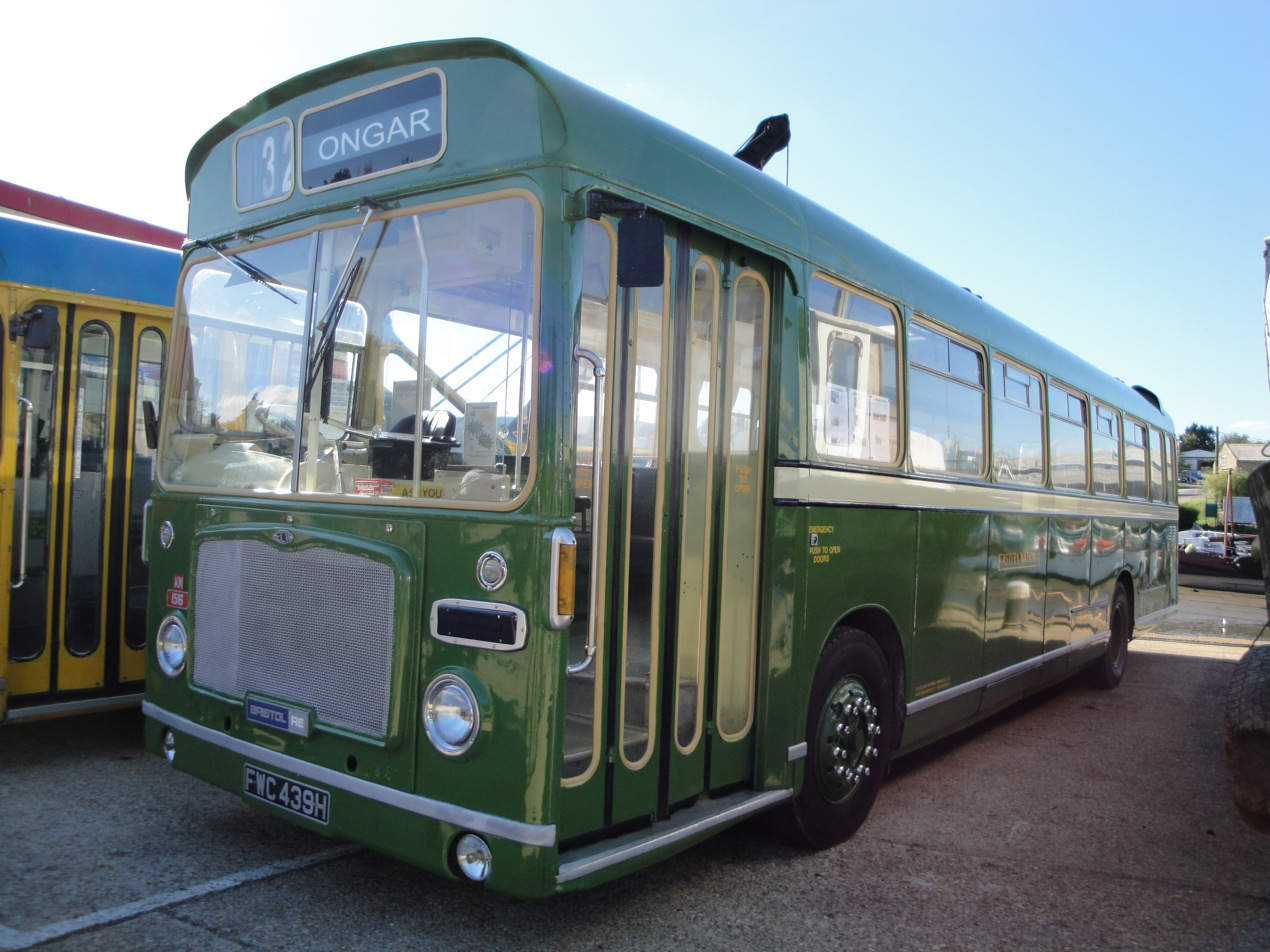
Preserved Eastern Coach Works-bodied Bristol RE (October 2010)

Eastern National Omnibus Company commenced operating in 1929 as a joint venture between the London and North Eastern Railway (LNER), the London, Midland and Scottish Railway (LMS) and the National Omnibus & Transport Company. The National company had originated in 1909 as the National Steam Car Company, operating steam bus services in London. The London services ceased in 1919, when the company was renamed National Omnibus & Transport Company.

The company expanded outside London, first in Essex(1913), where the company bought the bus operations of the Great Eastern Railway around Chelmsford; it later expanded into Bedfordshire (1919), Gloucestershire (1919), Somerset (1920), Dorset (1921), and Devon and Cornwall (1927). The National continued to expand in Essex, Hertfordshire and Bedfordshire.

The railways developed networks of feeder bus services in the 1920s, but the legal powers of the railway companies (Note: After 1922, these were the Big Four.) to run bus services were unclear and each promoted private legislation (Note: The Road Powers Acts of 1928.) to obtain clarity. One result was that the railways were in future to refrain from taking a controlling interest in bus undertakings. This led the railway companies to enter into partnerships with bus operators, including the National. The LNER, the LMS and the National formed the Eastern National Omnibus Company on 28 February 1929, to which all three shareholders transferred their bus operations in Essex, Hertfordshire, Buckinghamshire, Bedfordshire and Huntingdonshire.

In 1931, a controlling interest in the National Omnibus was acquired by the Tilling Group. From then on, Eastern National was run as a Tilling company, although the railways retained their shares until 1948.

== Nationalisation ==
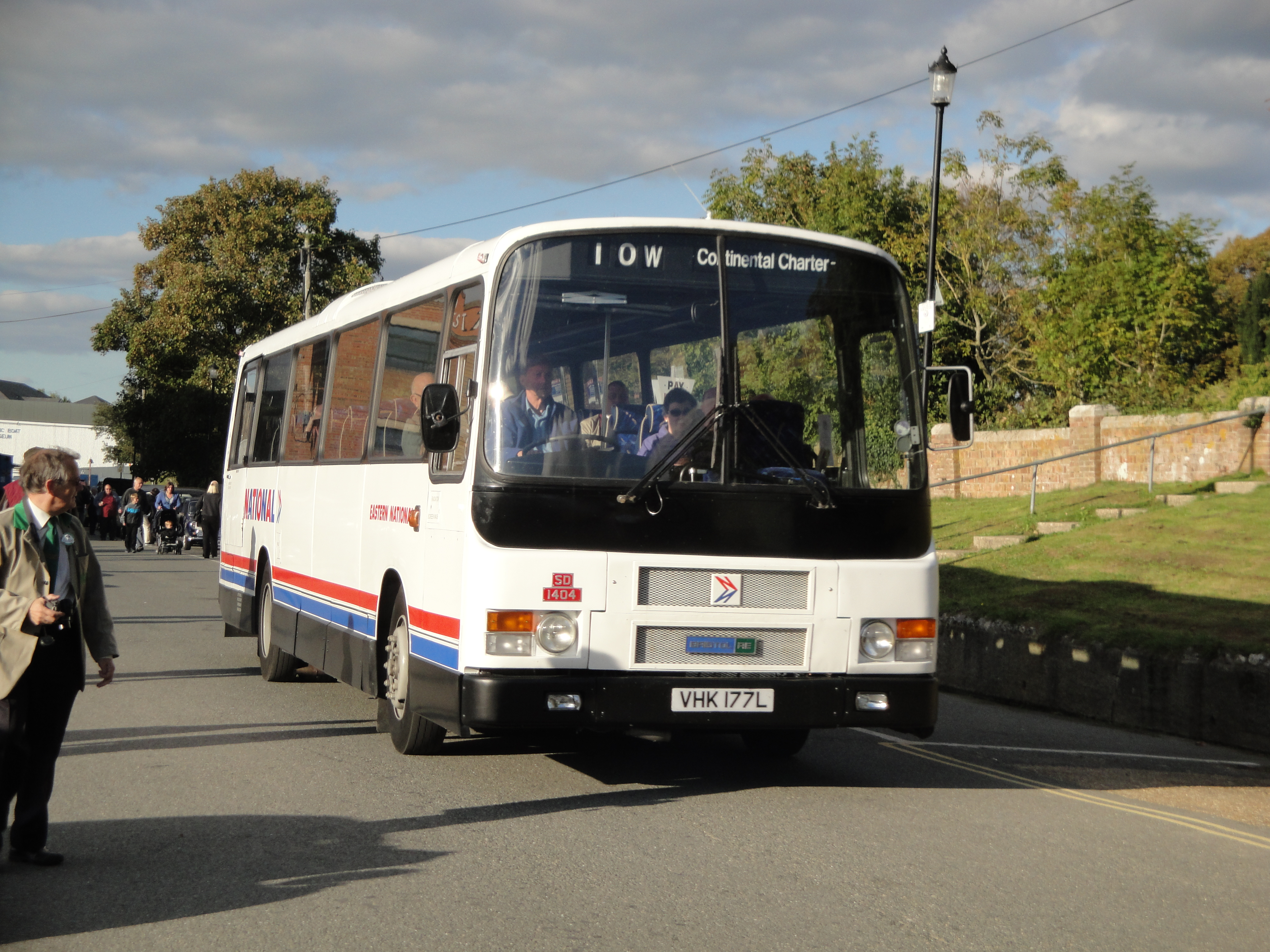
Preserved ECW-bodied Bristol RE (October 2010)

In 1948, the railways were nationalised and, shortly after, the Tilling Group sold its bus interests to the government. Eastern National therefore became a state-owned company, under the control of the British Transport Commission.

The new regime resulted in rationalisation of the company's area of operations. In 1952, operations in Bedfordshire, Buckinghamshire, North Hertfordshire and Huntingdonshire were transferred to United Counties; control of Westcliff Motor Services was transferred to Eastern National.

On 1 January 1963, Eastern National was included in the transfer of the British Transport Commission's transport assets to the state-owned Transport Holding Company, which in turn passed to the state-owned National Bus Company on 1 January 1969.

In 1964, it advertised the following express services:-

- X1 London - Rayleigh - Southend
- X10 London - Basildon - Southend
- X11 Enfield - Basildon - Southend
- X12 London - Colchester - Clacton - Jaywick Sands
- X14 London - Braintree - Halstead - Sudbury - Hadleigh - Bury St Edmunds
- X20 Southend - Basildon - Wrotham - Tonbridge - Tunbridge Wells - Brighton - Worthing
- X21 Southend - Basildon - Wrotham - Tonbridge - Tunbridge Wells - Hailsham - Eastbourne
- X22 Southend - Basildon - Rochester - Faversham, Canterbury - Dover and Folkestone
- X23 Southend - Basildon - Maidstone - Battle - Hastings - Eastbourne
- X24 Southend - Basildon - Sittingbourne - Faversham - Canterbury - Margate - Ramsgate
- X25 Southend - Basildon - Colchester - Lowestoft - Gorleston - Great Yarmouth
- X26 Southend - Basildon - Romford - Southampton - Bournemouth / Isle of Wight (using the Red Funnel steamer)
- X27 Southend - Colchester - Jaywick Sands, Clacton-on-Sea - Holland-on-Sea - Frinton-on-Sea - Walton-on-the-Naze
- X28 Southend - Chelmsford - Great Dunmow - Cambridge (for connections on Midland Red services for Northampton, Rugby, Coventry and Birmingham)
- X29 Southend - Basildon - Harlow - Hertford - Stamford - Oakham - Nottingham - Derby
- X30 Southsea - Portsmouth - Bognor Regis - Crawley - Dartford - Basildon - Southend
- X32/X34 Clacton - Colchester - Chelmsford - Basildon - Sittingbourne, Faversham, Canterbury, Birchington, Margate .. Ramsgate - Dover - Folkestone
- X33 Walton - Clacton - Colchester - Chelmsford - Basildon - Dartford - Medway Towns - Maidstone - Hastings
- X40 Tilbury Ferry- Basildon - Lowestoft - Gorleston - Great Yarmouth.

== Privatisation ==
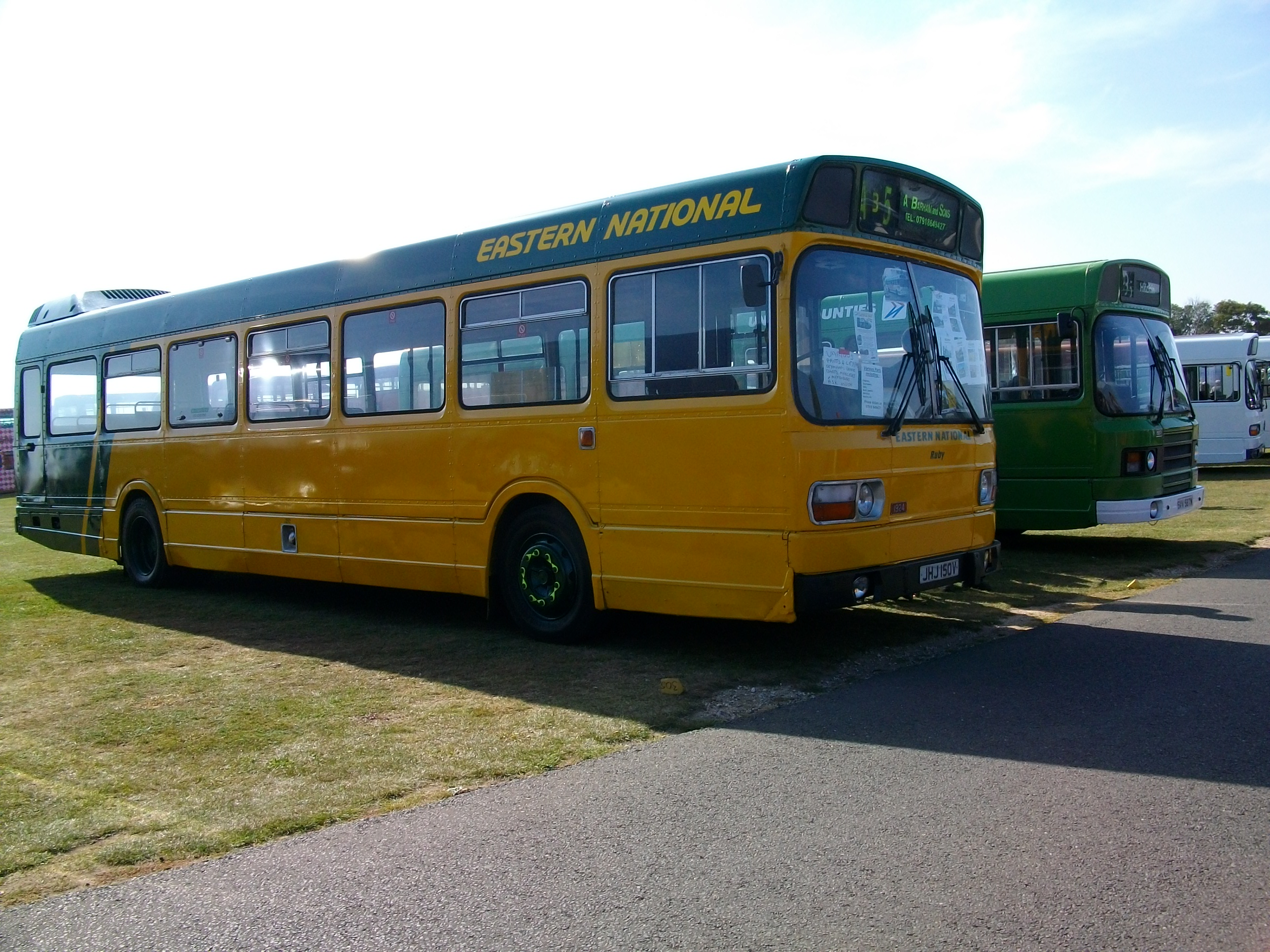
A preserved Leyland National in Eastern National's first post-privatisation livery (September 2009)

As part of the privatisation of the National Bus Company, Eastern National was sold in a management buyout. In 1990, Eastern National passed to Badgerline.

Badgerline divided the company into two brands:

- Thamesway in the south of Essex
- Eastern National in the north.

Eastern National was included in the June 1995 merger of Badgerline with GRT Group to form FirstBus. FirstBus combined the two operations and renamed the company First Essex.

== Depots ==
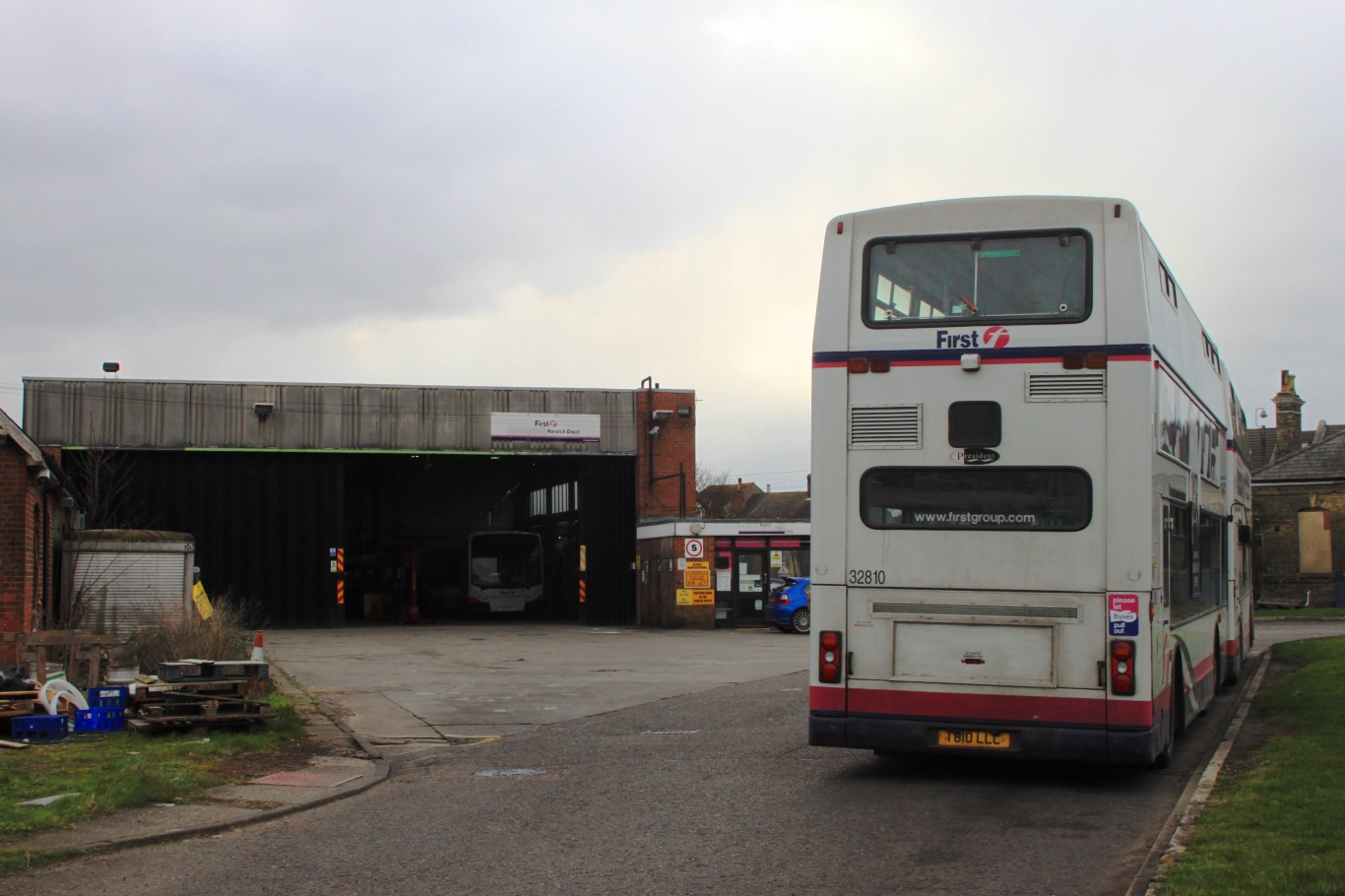
Harwich garage (February 2013)

The following locations hosted depots to maintain Eastern National's fleet:

Brentwood (BD): Brentwood depot was a small site, located near to the High Street on North Road. The site is now occupied by a Sainsbury's supermarket.

Braintree (BE): Braintree depot was situated on Fairfield Road, in the town centre. It had originally been used by Hicks Brothers, a bus operator that Eastern National took over in 1949. A house adjacent to the old depot site survives, to remind us of a link with the Hicks era.

Basildon (BN): Basildon depot is located on Cherrydown East, near to Basildon railway station. It was opened by Eastern National in 1961 to replace premises at Bull Road, Vange.

Chelmsford (CF): Chelmsford depot was located on New Writtle Street, with some maintenance duties carried out at the 1930s bus station on Duke Street. It had an outstation at Great Dunmow (DW).

Clacton (CN): Clacton depot was based at Castle Road, near to the town centre; this site was later redeveloped as flats, after the depot moved to Telford Road in 1988. The new premises, on the Gorse Lane industrial estate, were occupied previously by Coastal Red, a one-time competitor on the Tendring peninsular, which was bought by Eastern National on 28 February 1988.

There was an outstation of Clacton at Walton-on-the-Naze until May 1996. This was a small garage at Kino Road, coded WN, just off the seafront, which housed four vehicles. It was demolished in 1998, with bungalows built on the site; however, the enquiry office survives as a gift shop. The predecessor of Walton garage was Warners Iron Foundry at Naze Park Road, a building stands to this day. This had its origins with Silver Queen.

Colchester (CR): Colchester garage was located on Queen Street, which was on the site of the Theatre Royal that burned down circa 1917.

Until 1969, Eastern National also had a one bus outstation in Victoria Place, Brightlingsea. This was acquired with the business of Berry & Sons in 1937. Until 1973, Eastern National had a one bus outstation at West Mersea, acquired from Primrose Bus Service in 1935. The building there survives, but it was heavily modified in 1979 to become part of a new leisure centre. Service buses still terminate outside and locals still refer to it as "West Mersea bus station."

Canvey Island (CY): Canvey (CY) depot closed in April 1978 and has since become a transport museum.

Dovercourt / Harwich (DT): Harwich depot was sited alongside the bus station, off Main Road; it was opened by Eastern National in 1974. It replaced the old Dovercourt depot at Kingsway, which is now used as a public library.

Halstead (HD): Halstead depot had a small allocation of buses in the 1970s.

Hadleigh (HH): Hadleigh garage is located on London Road, just west of the shopping centre. It is a former Westcliff-on-Sea Motor Services depot, controlled by Eastern National from 1955. The operation was expanded in 1992, after Southend's Prittlewell depot was closed.

Kelvedon (KN}: Kelvedon depot was acquired when Moore Brothers of Kelvedon was taken over by ENOC on 3 February 1963.

Maldon (MN): Maldon was a full depot until 1993, when it became an outstation. South Woodham Ferrers (SW) was an outstation of Maldon with the allocation of one bus (Note: A Bristol VR, no. 3070, for school services to Chelmsford.) in the late 1980s.

Southend (SD): The depot in Southend-on-Sea was originally sited on London Road, but closed in 1987 to be replaced by a Sainsbury's store. Operations moved to a new site in Prittlewell.

Silver End (SE): Silver End depot was acquired when Moore Brothers of Kelvedon was taken over by ENOC in 1963. Rationalisation brought about the depot's first closure in December 1965; however, after extensive refurbishment, it reopened on 31 October 1974. The need to cut costs meant that the depot had to close for good on 6 August 1988. Operations were transferred to surrounding depots and the service provided for Silver End reduced to a basic hourly service.

Walthamstow (WW): Walthamstow depot was opened to support the CityBus operations in east London. Ponders End (PD) was an outstation.
