= Yorkshire Rider =

Bus operator in West Yorkshire, England

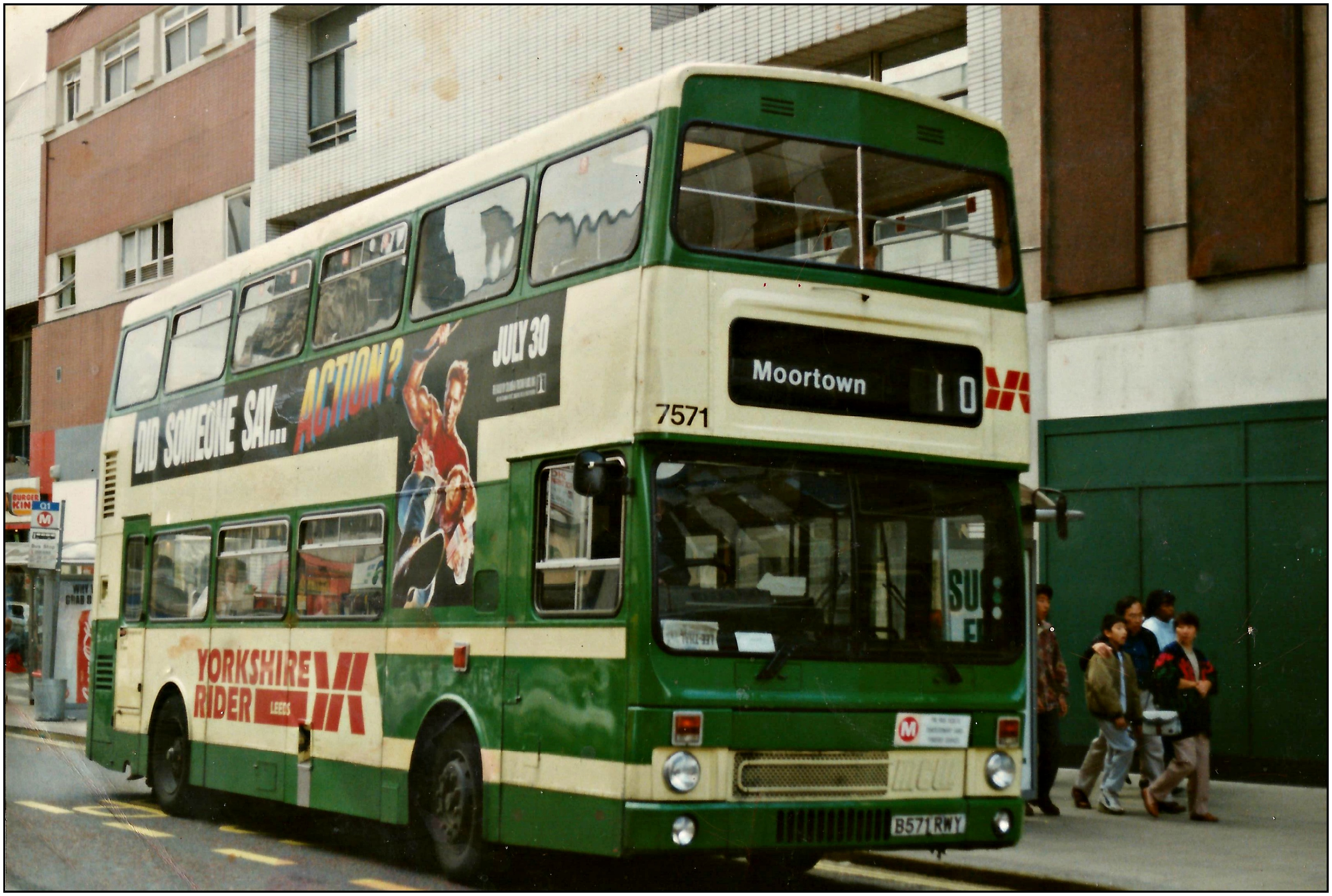
- A Yorkshire Rider MCW Metrobus in Leeds in August 1993
- Founded: September 1986; 39 years ago
- Ceased operation: September 1995; 30 years ago
- Headquarters: Leeds
- Service area: West Yorkshire

Yorkshire Rider was a bus company operating in West Yorkshire, England. The company was formed in 1986 out of the bus operations of the West Yorkshire Passenger Transport Executive. It was later bought by the Badgerline Group, who later became the FirstGroup, and the company trades today as First West Yorkshire.

== History ==
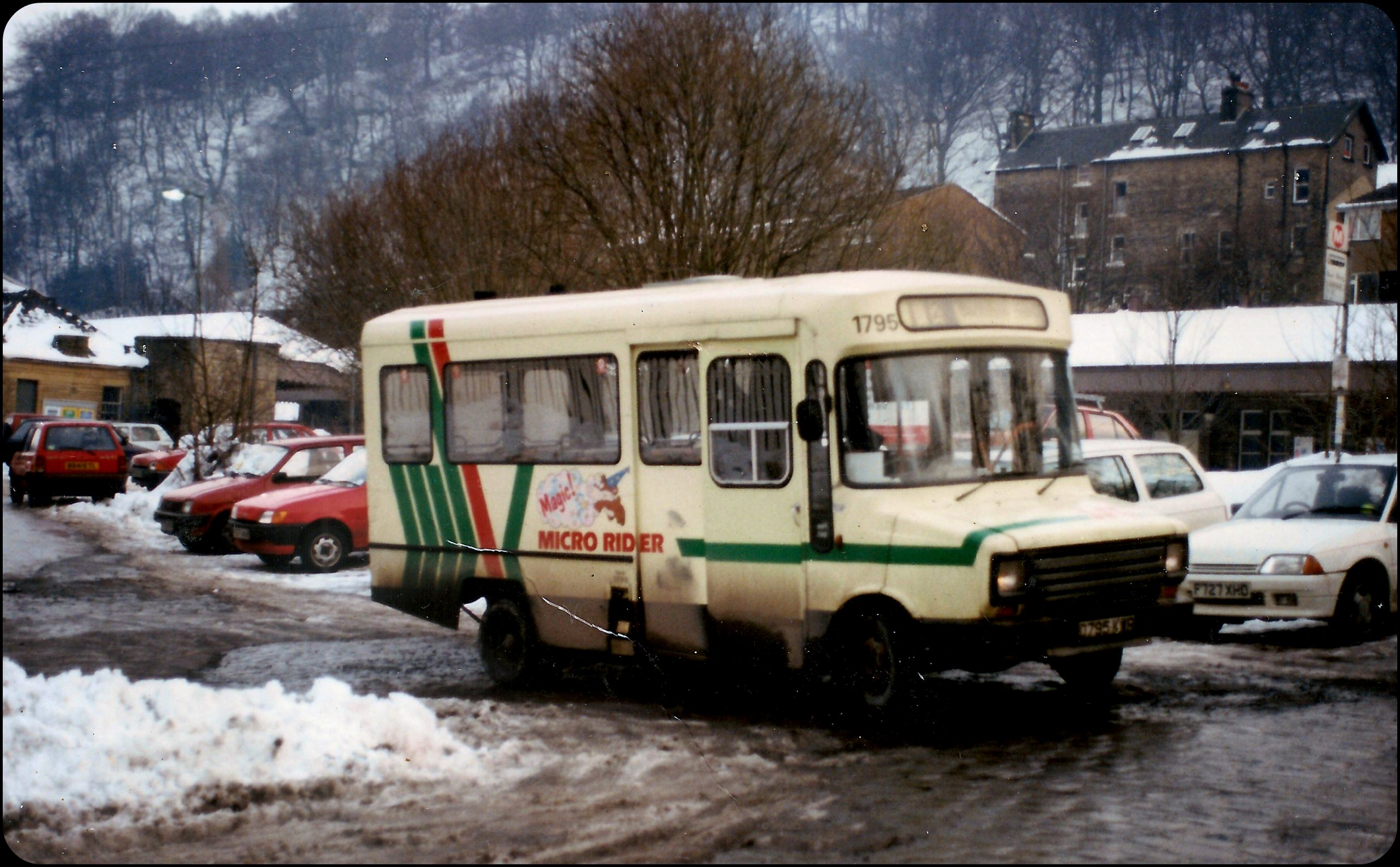
'Micro Rider' Dormobile bodied Freight Rover Sherpa at Hebden Bridge railway station in 1990

To comply with the Transport Act 1985, the West Yorkshire Passenger Transport Executive formed an arms length company named Yorkshire Rider in September 1986. West Yorkshire PTE's 'Metrobus' services were transferred to Yorkshire Rider upon the deregulation of West Yorkshire bus services on 26 October 1986.

On 21 October 1988, Yorkshire Rider was privatised for £20 million (equivalent to £59,737,000 in 2025). 51% of shares in the company were sold by West Yorkshire PTE to a team of eight managers in a management buyout, while the remaining 49% were sold to Yorkshire Rider's 3,500 employees in an Employee Share Ownership Plan, the largest such arrangement in the United Kingdom at the time.

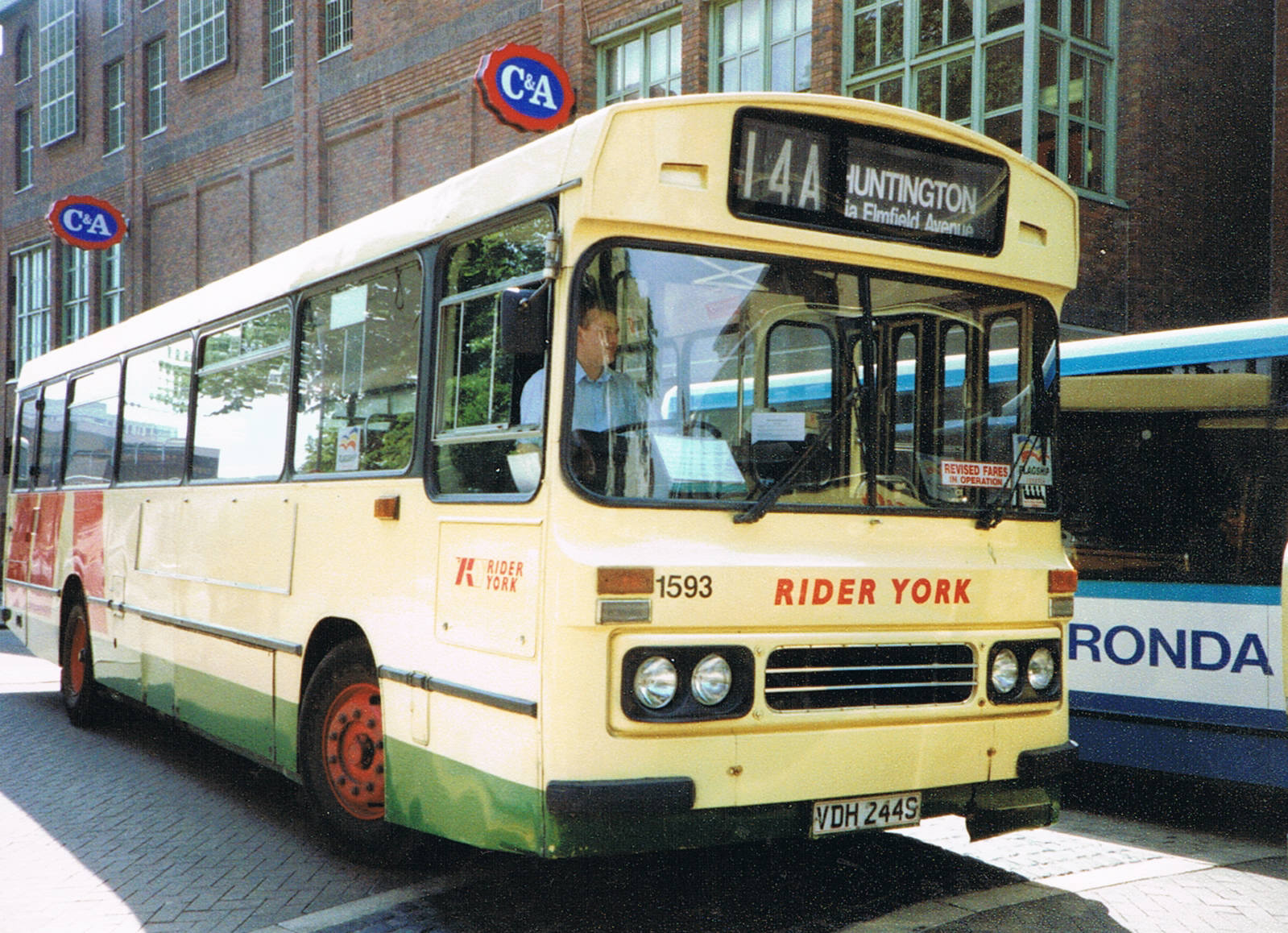
Rider York Duple Dominant bodied Leyland Leopard in York in 1992

After having previously been denied permission to purchase the former National Bus Company subsidiary upon its privatisation in 1987, Yorkshire Rider purchased the operations of the West Yorkshire Road Car Company from the AJS Group in July 1989, briefly maintaining West Yorkshire as a separate brand of Yorkshire Rider's operations before largely dissolving West Yorkshire amid cost-cutting measures in April 1990, resulting in 89 job losses and 26 buses being withdrawn from the fleet. Yorkshire Rider was also awarded a contract to operate the proposed Bradford trolleybus system in 1989, although ultimately, the project was cancelled. Yorkshire Rider later completed its purchase of the remaining AJS Group bus companies in August 1990, purchasing York bus operators Target Travel and York City & District as well as independent operator Reynard Buses, merging the operations of these companies to form the subsidiary company Rider York.

On 15 April 1994, Yorkshire Rider was purchased by the Badgerline Group for £38 million (equivalent to £80,179,000 in 2025), Initially, Badgerline's bid for Yorkshire Rider in late March was strongly opposed by the company's employee shareholding workforce, who had been promised full control of their company under a refinancing agreement with Yorkshire Rider's three executive directors. A rival buyout bid was planned by Yorkshire Rider's employees with support from the Transport and General Workers Union, however 93% of Rider's employee shareholders eventually voted in favour of the sale to Badgerline.

Yorkshire Rider was included in the merger of Badgerline with the GRT Group on 16 June 1995 to form FirstBus. Three months later in September 1995, Yorkshire Rider was made defunct by FirstBus and split into separate divisions:

- Bradford Traveller: covering Bradford with a depot at Bowling Back Lane
- Calderline: covering Halifax and Calderdale with depots in Halifax and Todmorden
- Kingfisher Huddersfield: covering Kirklees with a depot at Old Fieldhouse Lane
- Leeds City Link: covering the Leeds area with depots in Bramley, Hunslet and Torre Road

Yorkshire Rider's premium coaching and express bus brand, 'Gold Rider', was additionally sold by Leeds City Link in November 1996 to Leeds independent Angloblue Coaches.

In February 1998, the rebranded companies were all renamed to First Bradford, First Calderdale, First Huddersfield and First Leeds respectively as part of a rollout of the FirstBus brand to the company's subsidiaries across the United Kingdom. Today, these operate under First West Yorkshire, with Rider York also rebranded to First York.

== Depots ==
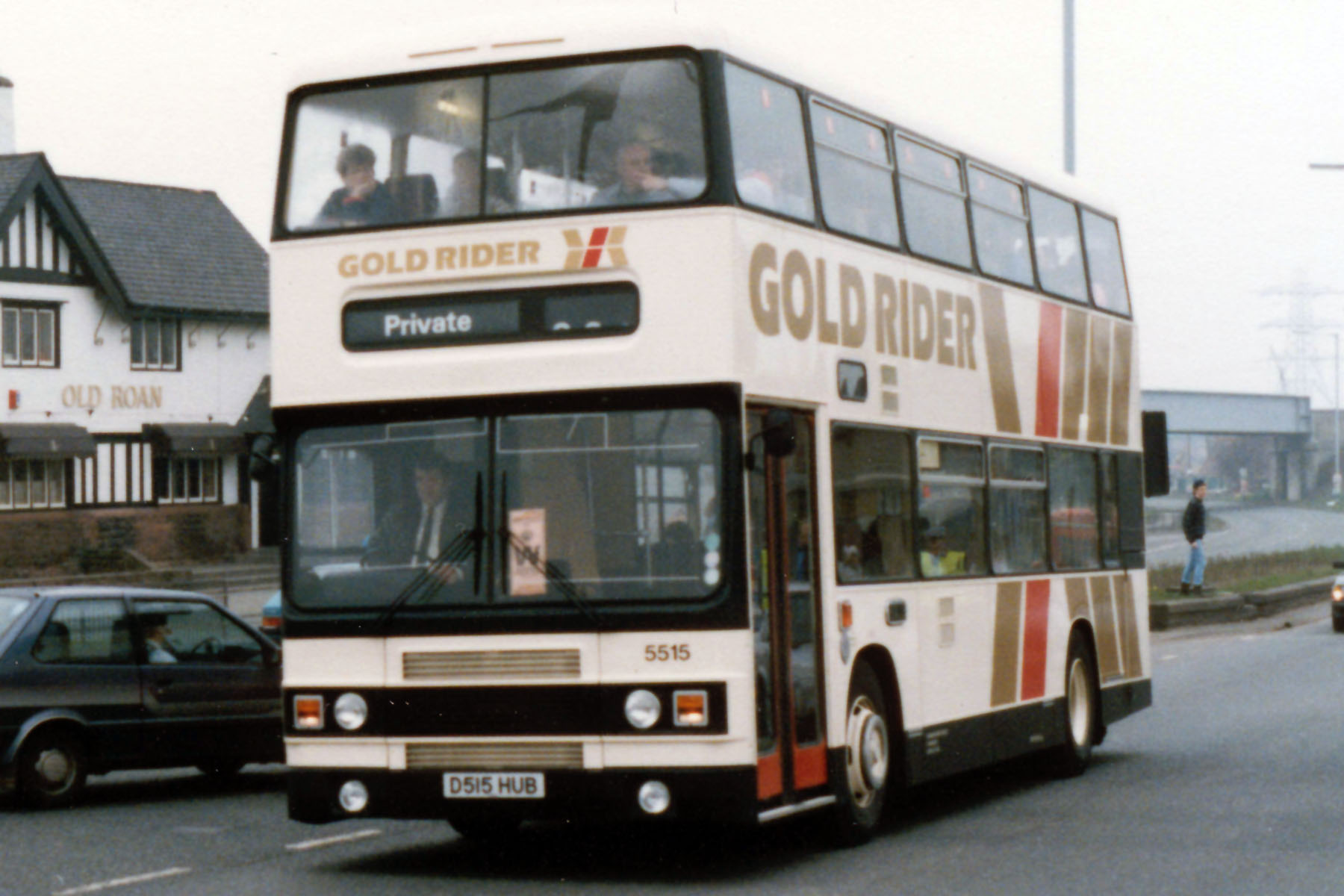
'Gold Rider' Optare bodied Leyland Olympian on a private hire excursion

The company's central engineering works in Kirkstall, as well as a bus depot in Headingley, were both closed for redevelopment in July 1992. An arson attack at the company's Torre Road depot in Burmantofts caused £2 million (equivalent to £4,112,000 in 2025) in fire damage, which included the destruction of thirteen double-decker buses stored at the depot overnight. Torre Road depot was closed by Leeds City Link a year later, replaced by a £1.5 million (equivalent to £3,011,000 in 2025) new depot a short distance away on Cherry Row.

After FirstBus took over Yorkshire Rider in 1996, most of its depots were either merged into First West Yorkshire or closed, however Cherry Row depot continued to be a satellite repair and outstation site for First Leeds until it was eventually closed, while the former Kirkstall engineering works were reused from time to time during the early FirstBus era for vehicle repairs and parts storage.

=== Yorkshire Rider Social Club ===
The Yorkshire Rider Social Club, one of the few remaining buildings where the Yorkshire Rider logo was still on display, existed up until 2012 before being rebranded. The building that was host to the YRSC was demolished in 2020, replaced by Leonora House, a residential apartment bloc on Railway Street.
