= West Yorkshire Road Car Company =

British bus operating company

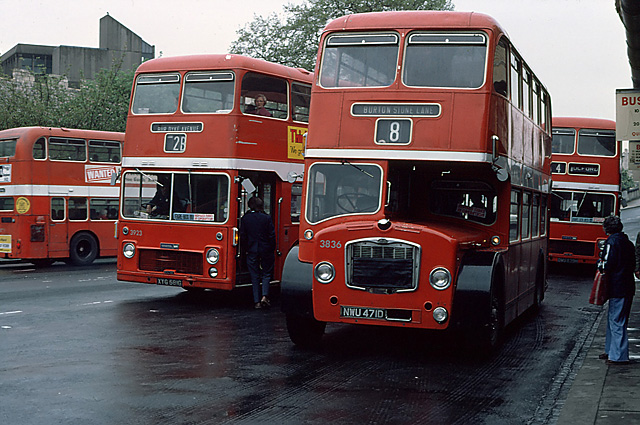
- Eastern Coach Works bodied Bristols in York
- Parent: National Bus Company
- Founded: 1906
- Ceased operation: 1989
- Headquarters: Harrogate
- Service area: North Yorkshire; West Yorkshire
- Service type: Bus operator
- Fleet: 400 (August 1987)

The West Yorkshire Road Car Company was a major bus operator operating in North and West Yorkshire between 1906 and 1987.

== History ==
=== West Yorkshire ===
The Harrogate Road Car Company was formed in 1906, running at first steam buses in Harrogate, then petrol buses which were introduced in 1911. In 1924, the company was absorbed into the Tilling & British Automobile Traction group, and its name changed to Harrogate & District Road Car Company. With the company's expansion during the following years, its name was changed to West Yorkshire Road Car Company in 1927, to reflect its wider geographical spread.

In the 1930s joint arrangements with Keighley Corporation and York City Council resulted in the formation of Keighley-West Yorkshire and York-West Yorkshire.

In 1948, the Tilling Group sold its bus interests to the government. West Yorkshire therefore became a state-owned company, under the control of the British Transport Commission.

On 1 January 1963, West Yorkshire was included in the transfer of the British Transport Commission's transport assets to the state-owned Transport Holding Company. In 1967. the Samuel Ledgard bus company was purchased. On 1 January 1969, West Yorkshire was included in the transfer of the Transport Holding Company to the National Bus Company.

On 3 May 1970, services that had been operated by Hebble Motor Services out of their Park Lane garage, were taken over by the West Yorkshire. The Hebble personnel from this takeover were also offered positions with the West Yorkshire in Bradford.

As part of the privatisation of the National Bus Company, West Yorkshire was sold in a management buyout to the AJS Group in 1987. In December 1988, West Yorkshire was split into smaller companies: York City & District, Harrogate & District, Keighley & District and Yorkshire Coastliner. York City & District was sold to Yorkshire Rider in July 1990 and the remainder of AJS was sold to Blazefield Holdings in July 1991. Blazefield were subsequently bought by Transdev in January 2006.

=== Keighley-West Yorkshire ===
In 1932, negotiations between Keighley Corporation and West Yorkshire led to a joint company being formed called Keighley-West Yorkshire Services. This new company absorbed all the local services in and around Keighley, but West Yorkshire Road Car Co kept its longer distance routes.

The 1974 Local Government reorganisation led to Keighley Corporation's interest in the joint company passing to West Yorkshire Road Car Co, with 'Keighley' disappearing as part of the fleet name on local buses for the first time.

=== York-West Yorkshire ===
In 1934, the York-West Yorkshire Joint Committee was formed as a joint venture with York City Council. When the National Bus Company was formed in January 1969, it was operating three services in York: National Bus, West Yorkshire Road Car Co (rural areas, Leeds and the East coast), and the York-West Yorkshire joint service.

The 1980, 1981 and 1985 Transport Acts, gradually deregulated the bus companies. The joint service with York and the City Council could no longer operate and York City Council's interest was sold to West Yorkshire.

== Services ==
A 1966 timetable can be viewed online at https://timetableworld.com/ttw-viewer?token=b28f6373-a8ce-4d9b-9064-d30eaec23244

== Fleet numbering ==
Up to 1954, fleet identification was purely numerical. In April 1954 the fleet was renumbered using type identification letters in addition to sequence numbering.

The first letter denoted the body type: D (double decker), S (single decker), E (express, or dual purpose), C (coach)

The second letter generally denoted engine type: B (Bristol), G (Gardner), A, (AEC or Albion), F (Ford), P (Petrol)

The third letter (if present) was L (30 ft (9.1 m) long) or W (8 ft (2.4 m) wide)

So, for example, Bristol KSW6B reg no. KWU 361 was given a fleet number of DBW5.

In addition to the rules above, Keighley- and York-West Yorkshire bus fleet numbers were prefixed with K or Y as appropriate so, for example, Keighley-West Yorkshire Bristol K6B reg no. GWX 125 was given a fleet number of KDB30.

Over the years, several exceptions to these rules evolved, including DX (Double deck eXperimental), used to denote Bristol Lodekka buses, SUG/EUG/CUG (Single-decker/Express/Coach Underfloor-engined Gardner), SMA/SMG (Single-decker Mid-engined Albion/Gardner), SRG (Single-decker Rear-engined Gardner), VR (Vertical Rear-engined – Bristol VR type)

In October 1971 the fleet was again renumbered and the class identification letters disappeared as the fleet identifiers once again reverted to purely numerical system. Although there were fewer than 600 vehicles, four-digit numbers were used: the last three digits uniquely identified the vehicle, whilst the first digit indicated the fleet (1 for the main fleet, 2 for Keighley-West Yorkshire and 3 for York-West Yorkshire). Thus, the first batch of Leyland National buses were numbered 1411–1423, 2425–2429 and 3430–3433. When the Keighley joint operation ended in 1974, the 2 prefix was altered to 1. From 1979, numbers in the 2000s were used for coaches but this was a separate series – for example, 1001 and 2001 were in use at the same time.

== Garages ==
West Yorkshire had a number of garages during its existence. In April 1958, vehicles were fitted with small coloured discs next to their fleet number to identify their main garage. Sub-garages inherited the colour of their parent garage, however Keighley- and York-West Yorkshire vehicles were not fitted with the discs as they were already identifiable by the K- or Y prefix. The garages and colour codes were as follows:

- Bradford (blue)
- Harrogate (green)
  - Otley (green)
  - Pateley Bridge (green)
- Keighley (grey)
  - Grassington (grey)
  - Ilkley (grey)
  - Skipton (grey)
- Leeds (maroon)
  - Wetherby (maroon)
- York (yellow)
  - Malton (yellow)
  - Scarborough (yellow)
