= List of vehicles at the Museum of Transport, Greater Manchester =

This is a list of vehicles in the collection of the Museum of Transport, Greater Manchester.

Picture	Description	Operator	Fleet number	Registration	Seats	Entered service	Withdrawn	Notes	References
	Omnibus	Manchester Carriage and Tramways Company	L2	N/A		1890			
	Tram	South Lancashire Tramways	65	N/A		1906			
	Recovery vehicle	Stockport Corporation Transport	106	YM 9410		1926			
	Single deck bus	Ribble Motor Services	C295	CK 3825		1927			
	Single deck bus	Ribble Motor Services	957	VY957		1929			
	Single deck bus	Manchester Corporation Transport	28	VR 5742		1930			
	Double deck bus	Manchester Corporation Transport	436	ANB 851		1934			
	Chassis	Manchester Corporation Transport	526	AXJ 857		1934			
	Single deck bus	Stockport Corporation Transport	185	JA 7585		1935			
	Double deck bus	North Western Road Car Company (1923)	432	AJA 152		1939			
	Double deck bus	Salford Corporation Transport	235	BBA 560		1939			
	Double deck bus	Wigan Corporation Transport	70	JP 4712		1940			
	Double deck bus	Leigh Corporation Motors	84	FTB 11		1941			
	Fire engine	Salford Corporation Fire Brigade		BRJ 333		1941			
	Recovery vehicle	Wigan Corporation Transport	Matador	Unregistered		1941			
	Recovery vehicle	Lancashire United Transport	Matador	LSU 282		1943			
	Lorry	Beverley's Beers	6	AHL 622		1946			
	Single deck bus	North Western Road Car Company (1923)	270	BJA 425		1946			
	Single deck bus	Ramsbottom Urban District Council Transport	17	HTB 656		1946			
	Tower wagon	Manchester Corporation Transport	A118	HVM 93		1947			
	Double deck bus	North Western Road Car Company (1923)	224	CDB 224		1947			
	Double deck bus	Oldham Corporation Passenger Transport	246	DBU 246		1947			
	Single deck coach	Warburton Bros (Bury) Ltd		HTF 586		1947			
	Tower wagon	Bolton Corporation Transport	2	CWH 717		1948			
	Road Sweeper	Manchester Corporation Cleansing Department	156	JNA 256		1948			
	Double deck bus	Manchester Corporation Transport	2150	JND 791		1949			
	Double deck bus	Manchester Corporation Transport	3166	JNA 467		1949			
	Single deck coach	R Bullock		LMA 284		1949			
	Trolleybus	Ashton-under-Lyne Corporation Passenger Transport	80	LTC 774		1950			
	Double deck bus	Oldham Corporation Passenger Transport	368	FBU 827		1950			
	Single deck bus	W Alexander & Sons	PA164	CWG 206		1950			
	Trolleybus	Manchester Corporation Transport	1250	JVU 755		1951			
	Double deck bus	Manchester Corporation Transport	3245	JND 646		1951			
	Double deck bus	Stockport Corporation Transport	308	EDB 562		1951			
	Double deck bus	Stockport Corporation Transport	321	EDB 575		1951			
	Double deck bus	Rochdale Corporation Transport	235	HDK 835		1951			
	Double deck bus	Bury Corporation Transport	177	BEN 177		1952			
	Single deck bus	Manchester Corporation Transport	25	NNB 125		1953			
	Double deck bus	SHMD Board	70	UMA 370		1955			
	Double deck bus	Bolton Corporation Transport	77	JBN 153		1956			
	Double deck bus	Manchester Corporation Transport	3460	PND 460		1956			
	Double deck bus	Rochdale Corporation Transport	280	NDK 980		1956			
	Double deck bus	Oldham Corporation Passenger Transport	394	NBU 494		1957			
	Single deck coach	Ellen Smith		SDK 442		1958			
	Double deck bus	Manchester Corporation Transport	3496	TNA 496		1958			
	Double deck bus	Manchester Corporation Transport	3520	TNA 520		1958			
	Double deck bus	Wigan Corporation Transport	115	DJP 754		1958			
	Double deck bus	Lancashire United Transport	27	122 JTD		1959			
	Double deck bus	Manchester Corporation Transport	3629	UNB 629		1960			
	Double deck bus	Wigan Corporation Transport	57	HEK 705		1961			
	Single deck coach	Yelloway		YDK 590		1961			
	Single deck bus	Manchester Corporation Transport	55	3655 NE		1962			
	Double deck bus	Salford Corporation Transport	112	TRJ 112		1962			
	Double deck bus	Bury Corporation Transport	116	REN 116		1963			
	Double deck bus	London Transport	RM 1414	414 CLT		1963			
	Double deck bus	Manchester Corporation Transport	4632	4632 VM		1963			
	Double deck bus	A Mayne & Son		8860 VR		1964			
	Double deck bus	Ashton-under-Lyne Corporation Passenger Transport	44	PTE 944C		1965			
	Double deck bus	Leigh Corporation Motors	15	PTC 114C		1965			
	Single deck bus	Manchester Corporation Transport	74	BND 874C		1965			
	Double deck bus	North Western Road Car Company (1923)	174	DDB 174C		1965			
	Double deck bus	Salford Corporation Transport	214	DBA 214C		1965			
	Car	Private transport		NPB 840D		1966			
	Double deck bus	Salford Corporation Transport	254	FRJ 254D		1966			
	Double deck bus	Manchester Corporation Transport	1001	HVM 901F		1968			
	Double deck bus	Stockport Corporation Transport	71	KJA 871F		1968			
	Double deck bus	Ramsbottom Urban District Council Transport	11	TTD 386H		1969			
	Double deck bus	Stockport Corporation Transport	91	MJA 891G		1969			
	Double deck bus	Stockport Corporation Transport	97	MJA 897G		1969			
	Double deck bus	SELNEC Passenger Transport Executive	1205	SRJ 328H		1970			
	Leyland Atlantean (double deck bus)	SELNEC Passenger Transport Executive	7001	VNB 101L	75	1972	1986		
	Leyland National (Single deck bus)	SELNEC Passenger Transport Executive	EX30	TXJ 507K		1972			
	Midibus	Greater Manchester Transport	1722	XVU 352M		1974			
	Single deck bus	Greater Manchester Transport	EX62	GNC 276N		1975			
	Single deck coach	Yelloway		HVU 244N		1975			
	Double deck bus	Greater Manchester Transport	5083	ORJ 83W		1981			
	Double deck bus	GM Buses South	8706	A706 LNC		1984			
	Double deck bus	Greater Manchester Transport	3065	B65 PJA		1984			
	Double deck bus	Greater Manchester Transport	5208	C208 FVU		1986			
	Minibus	The Bee Line Buzz Company	63	D63 NOF		1986			
	Minibus	GM Buses	1676	D676 NNE		1987			
	Light rail vehicle	Manchester Metrolink	1000	N/A		1990			
	Minibus	Ring and Ride	W4	M939 XKA		1994			
	Low-floor double deck bus	Stagecoach Manchester	612	T612 MNF		1999			
	Low-floor double deck bus	Stagecoach Manchester	19001	MX06 LUO		2006			
	Midibus	Go North West	59001	YJ60 KCA		2010			
