= North Western Road Car Company =

North Western Road Car Company may refer to one of two bus operators running within the north west of England in different eras:

- North Western Road Car Company (1923), the original (1923-1974) company based in Stockport, England
- North Western Road Car Company (1986), the bus company based in Liverpool, England
