= North Western Road Car Company (1986) =

Bus operator in North West England

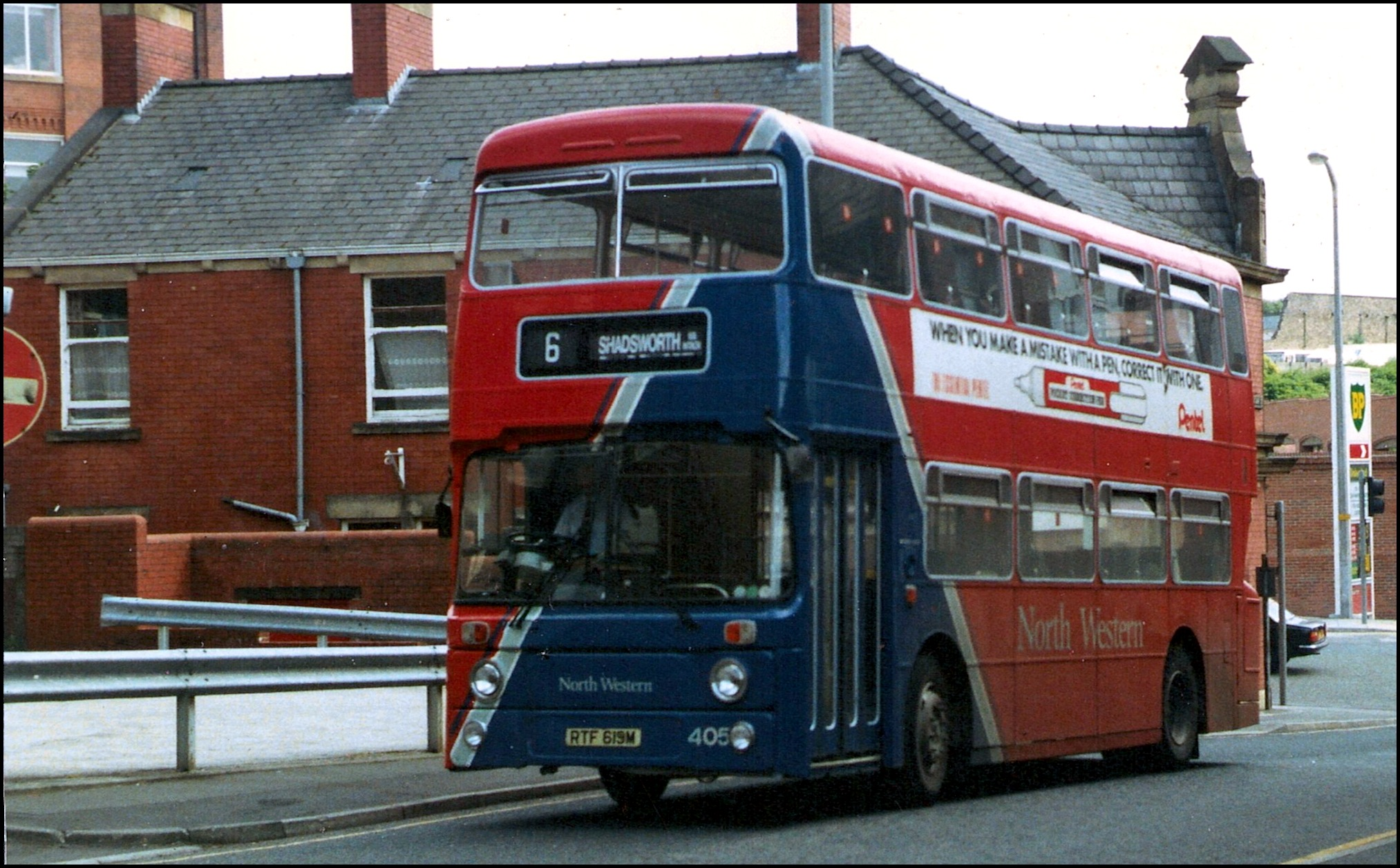
- Park Royal bodied Leyland Atlantean in Blackburn in 1987
- Parent: 1986-1988: National Bus Company; 1988-1998: Drawlane Group/British Bus
- Founded: 7 September 1986; 39 years ago
- Ceased operation: January 1998; 28 years ago
- Headquarters: Aintree, Merseyside, England
- Service area: Cheshire; Greater Manchester; Lancashire; Merseyside
- Service type: Bus operator

The North Western Road Car Company, commonly abbreviated to North Western, was a bus operator based in Aintree in Merseyside, running services in Cheshire, Greater Manchester, Lancashire and Merseyside. Following its sale from the National Bus Company, the company was a subsidiary of the Drawlane Group and its successor British Bus, and operated services between September 1986 and January 1998. The company today trades as part of Arriva North West.

== History ==
=== Formation ===
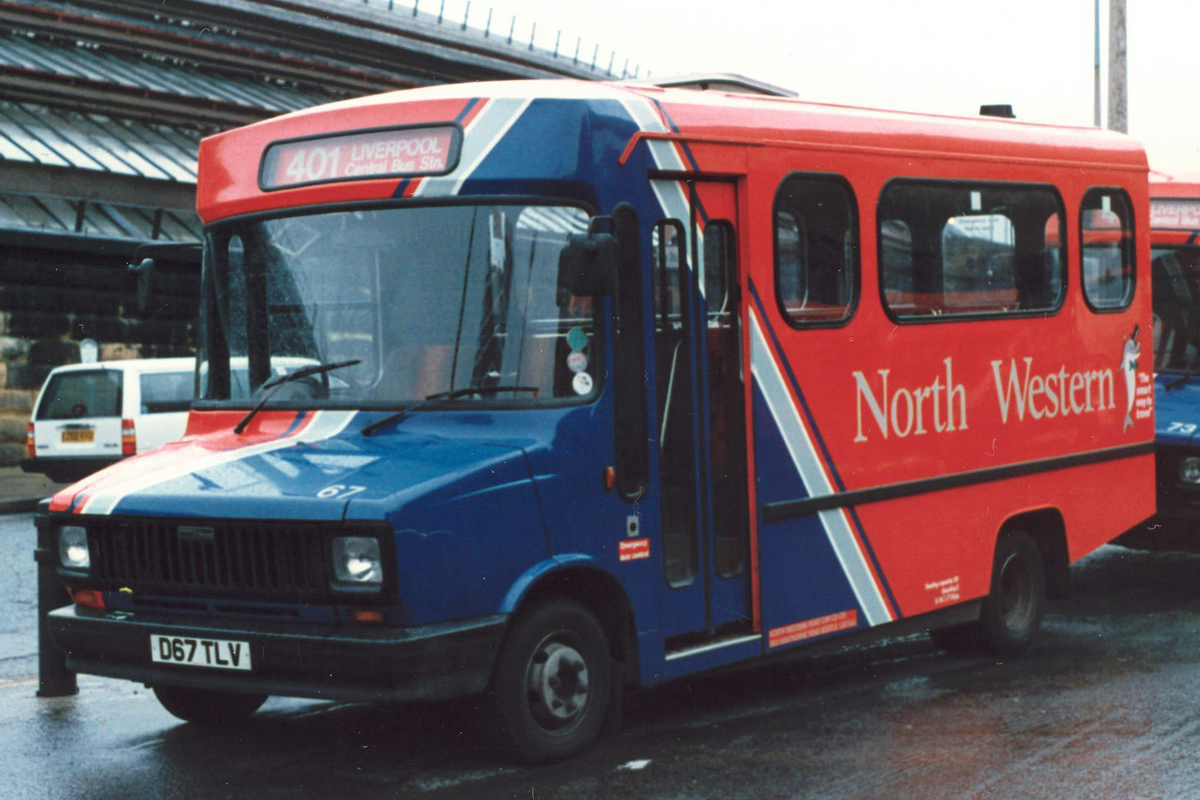
Carlyle Works bodied Freight Rover minibus in Liverpool in 1987

In the lead up to the deregulation of the bus industry in Great Britain, which resulted in the breakup of the National Bus Company (NBC) on 26 October 1986, the government stipulated that the NBC split their larger business units to boost competition. Of these included Ribble Motor Services, whose operations stretched across North West England in the counties of Cumbria, Lancashire, Greater Manchester and Merseyside. In March 1986, alongside a split of Cumbrian garages to fellow NBC subsidiary Cumberland Motor Services, it was agreed that Ribble's depots in Aintree and Bootle (on Merseyside), as well as Skelmersdale (in Lancashire) and Wigan (in Greater Manchester), were to transfer to a reconstituted North Western Road Car Company, with the company officially being launched on 7 September at an event at the Aintree Racecourse.

The North Western Road Car Company name had previously been used by a National Bus Company subsidiary originally founded in 1923, which was based in Stockport and ran operations in Cheshire, Derbyshire, southeast Lancashire and what eventually became Greater Manchester. The subsidiary was split up by the NBC in 1972, with parts of North Western absorbed by Crosville Motor Services, Ribble Motor Services, Trent Motor Traction and the SELNEC Passenger Transport Executive.

Upon its formation with a fleet of 260 buses inherited from Ribble, the new North Western Road Car Company adopted a diagonal red and blue livery broken up by a grey stripe to replace Ribble's NBC corporate red livery, with white fleetnames identifying the company as 'North Western'. The new company was initially based in Bootle, with operations later moving to Aintree in 1989.

In March 1988, North Western was sold by the NBC to the Drawlane Group, who organised the company to run as a fully autonomous subsidiary.

=== Expansion ===
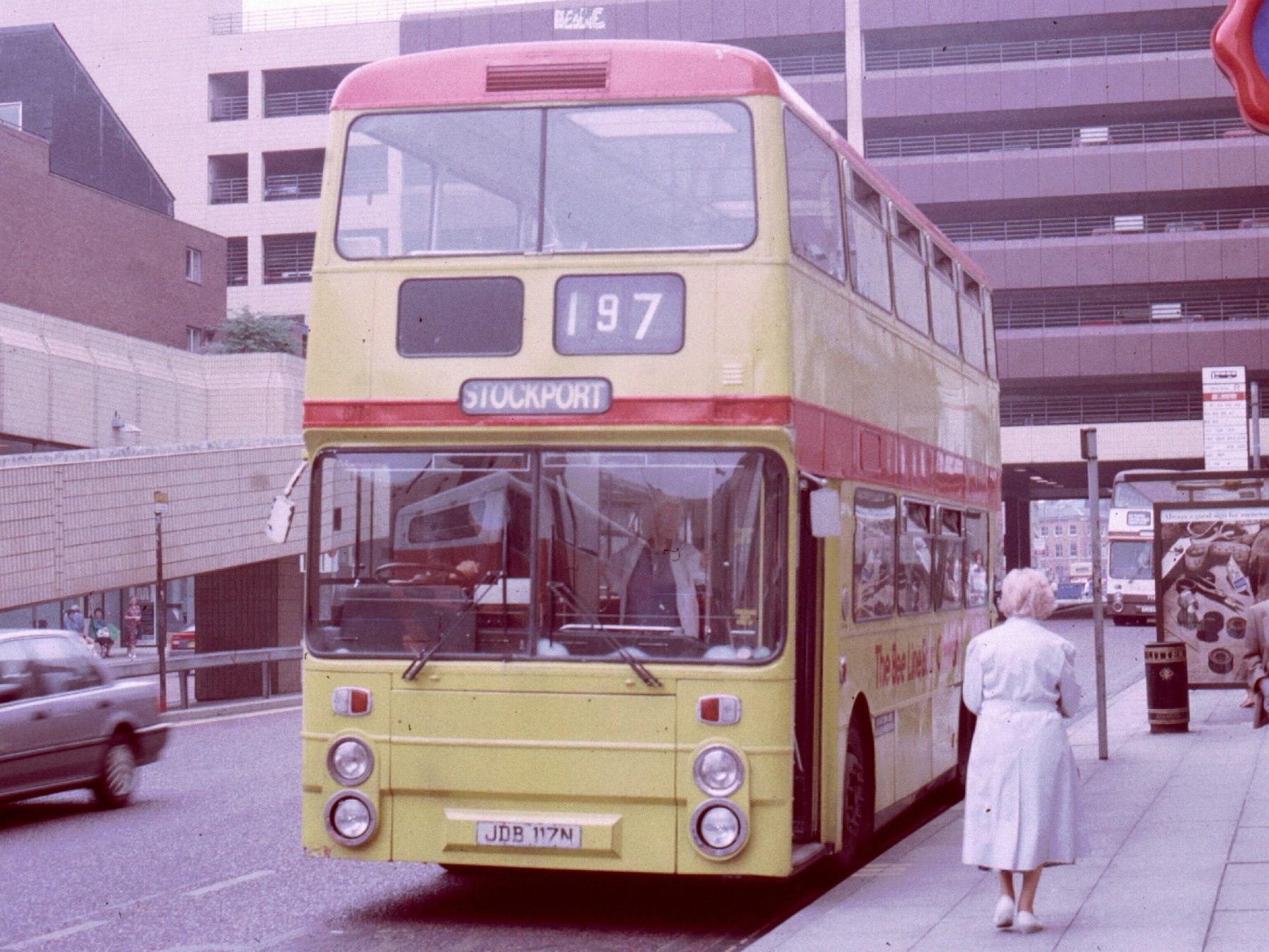
Bee Line Buzz Company Northern Counties bodied Leyland Atlantean outside the Manchester Arndale in 1992

In February 1989, the Drawlane Group purchased the English operations of former NBC subsidiary Crosville Motor Services, split from its Welsh operations and running services in Cheshire, the Wirral and parts of Greater Manchester, from ATL Group holding company ATL (Western). Initially, Drawlane had planned to maintain Crosville as a subsidiary company. However, as Crosville's English operations bordered with both North Western's and fellow Drawlane subsidiary Midland Red North's own, the company was split in a November 1989 reorganisation of Drawlane's North West England operations, with depots and 80 vehicles in Runcorn, Warrington and Winsford being transferred to North Western.

In October 1989, Drawlane agreed a deal with Stagecoach Holdings to sell North Western's operations in Blackburn to Stagecoach Ribble, in exchange for Drawlane purchasing both Greater Manchester-based minibus operator Bee Line Buzz Company and Stagecoach East Midland's FrontRunner North West operation. The two companies were merged together as a North Western subsidiary operating from depots in Glossop and Stockport, and Bee Line began transitioning from a high-frequency minibus operation to running all Drawlane Group services in south and central Manchester, using conventional double-decker buses transferred from Drawlane's London & Country subsidiary and other operators. Bee Line's Stockport garage was eventually closed in November 1990, with most of the company's minibuses disposed of to bring the fleet down from 320 to 260 buses.

Following Drawlane's initial acquisition of the national coach operator in 1991, in the spring of 1993, the bus operations of National Express were split into British Bus to allow National Express' float on the London Stock Exchange, with North Western gaining the Welsh operations of Crosville Cymru and Liverpool-based Amberline. British Bus' position in Liverpool was consolidated further in July 1993 with the acquisition of Liverline Travel Services, retaining the company as a subsidiary of North Western.

=== Rebranding and consolidation ===
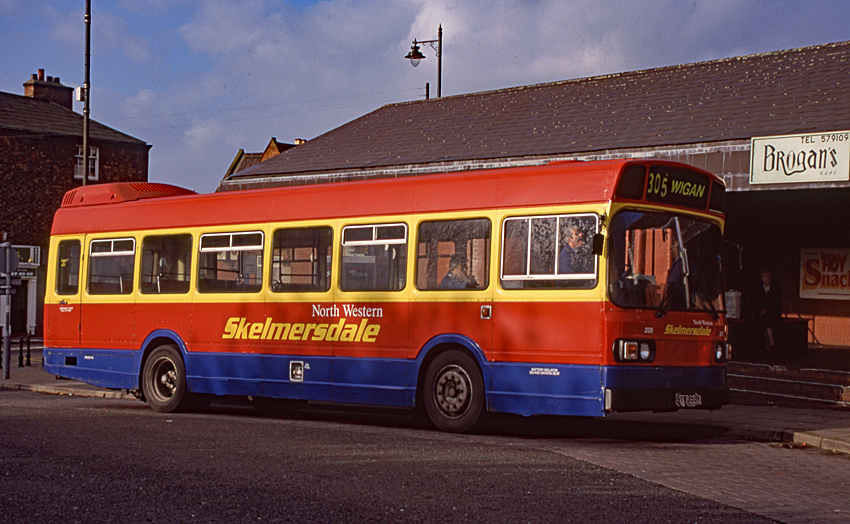
Leyland National with North Western Skelmersdale branding at Ormskirk bus station in October 1998

North Western undertook a rebranding during 1994 that saw the company's initial diagonal red and blue livery replaced with a conventionally-styled red, yellow and blue livery. The rebranding saw individual branding introduced for certain services, such the Runcorn Busway and 'CityPlus' for services in Liverpool, introduced alongside new Northern Counties and East Lancashire Coachbuilders bodied buses, as well as a rationalisation of the Bee Line fleet that saw 50 MCW Metrobuses leased for a three-year period from West Midlands Travel.

Amid the rebranding, in January 1995, North Western expanded operations based from its Warrington depot, forming the 'Warrington Goldlines' network. North Western quickly engaged in a bus war with municipal operator Warrington Borough Transport, aiming to usurp Warrington Borough Transport's dominance through the introduction of copycat services ran by a fleet of new Plaxton Pointer bodied Dennis Darts on the Warrington Goldlines network. The bus war began to de-escalate from mid-1996 after an agreement was made between the two operators to withdraw loss-making competitive services.

During 1995, North Western also entered into two 'gentlemen's agreements' with larger rival bus operators within its operating area. The first of these was to co-ordinate and share services in Merseyside with its largest operator, Merseybus, and the second was for North Western to give up the Bee Line Buzz Company to GM Buses North, in exchange for GM Buses North's services connecting Wigan and Leigh to St Helens and Warrington passing to North Western. These and other agreements between operators were subject to a Monopolies and Mergers Commission study, which found North Western, Merseybus and GM Buses, among other Merseyside bus operators, guilty of collusion and in breach of fair trade.

In August 1996, North Western's parent British Bus was acquired by the Cowie Group, who rebranded themselves as Arriva in November 1997. The North Western Road Car Company was renamed to Arriva North West in January 1998, with the Bee Line operation becoming Arriva Manchester and Liverline becoming a part of Arriva Merseyside.
