= Workington bus station =

Bus station in Cumbria, England

Workington Bus Station
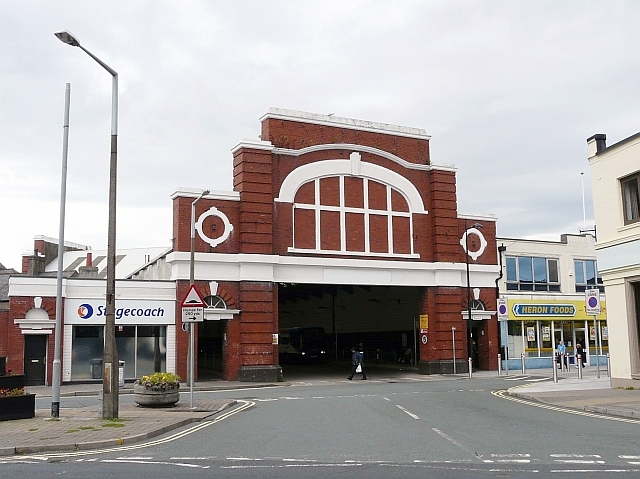
- Entrance to the bus station from Murray Road

General information
- Location: Murray Road
- Coordinates: 54.64368°N 3.54865°W
- Operator: Stagecoach
- Bus operators: Stagecoach

History
- Opened: 9 March 1926
Location
- Location within Cumbria

Workington bus station is a bus station in Workington, England. It was opened on 19 March 1926 by Cumberland Motor Services as the first purpose-built covered bus station in Great Britain. In March 2006, a request from the Workington and District Civic Trust to have the building listed was turned down as it was deemed to have had too many modifications. In October 2006, a plaque was added to the exterior of the building to commemorate its history. In 2019, the bus station was redecorated and paintings from local schoolchildren were installed on its interior walls.

== Routes ==
All the routes out of the bus station is run by Stagecoach in Cumbria on the following routes:

Number	Route	Notes
1/1A	Parton Circular	
29/29A	Whitehaven	Via Lilyhall
30	Whitehaven or Maryport	
50/51	Moorclose Circular	Via Railway Station
52	Harrington	
300	Carlisle	
X4/X5	Keswick then Penrith	

== Centenary Refurbishment ==
In August 2024, Cumberland Council announced it had received £2.1 million in funding for refurbishing parts of Workington Town Centre, including approaches to the bus station.

Following this announcement, in July 2025, Workington Bus Station closed for six weeks of major refurbishment works, a deep clean and repainting. Costing Stagecoach around £100,000, the internal layout was changed to have all stands on one side of the bus station, reducing the need to cross the station. On reopening in September, work was still ongoing to reinstate two bus stands on the South side of the station.
