= Yelloway Motor Services =

British bus operating company

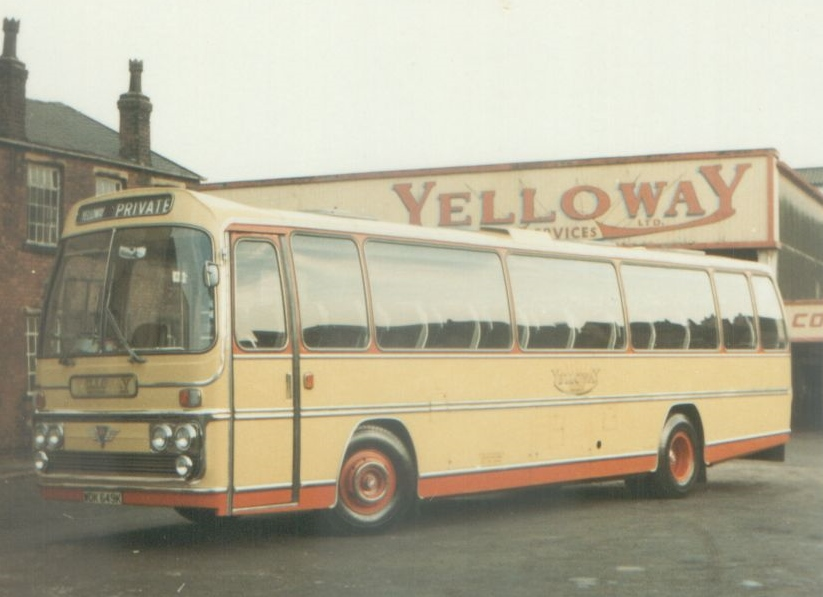
- Plaxton bodied AEC Reliance outside the Rochdale garage in September 1972
- Founded: 1915
- Ceased operation: 1988, revived 2008 Chadderton
- Headquarters: Rochdale
- Service area: Greater Manchester
- Service type: Coach service operator

Yelloway Motor Services was a bus and coach company based in Rochdale.

== History ==
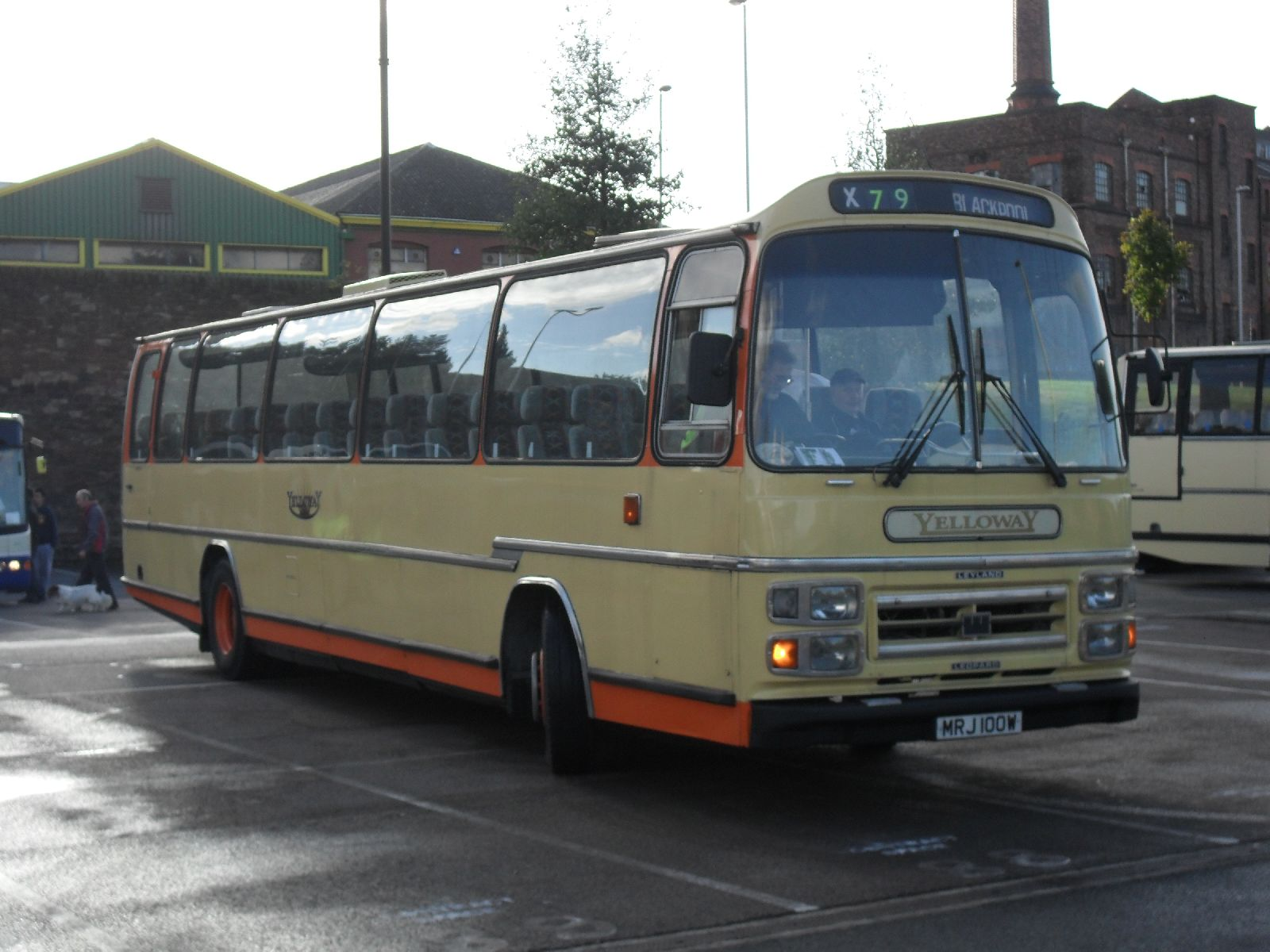
Preserved Plaxton Supreme bodied Leyland Leopard in 2009

In 1902, Robert Holt commenced a parcels delivery service in the Rochdale area using a pony and cart. In 1904, Holt went into partnership with his younger brother Ernest and they established themselves as carriers trading as Messrs Holt Brothers. Additional ponies and carts were purchased, later followed by steam and motor lorries.

In an attempt to earn additional revenue, when the lorries would otherwise be idle, interchangeable charabanc bodies to enable the lorries to be converted into passenger pleasure vehicles at weekends. In May 1913 the first purpose-built charabanc entered service, a 28-seat Dennis painted in a yellow livery with burgundy upholstery. When it arrived at the offices of Holt Bros in Rochdale a member of staff shouted "The Yellow Car has arrived!" This remark was the birth of the trading name Holts Yellow Cars. In November 1915, the company was incorporated as Holt Bros (Rochdale) Limited.

The company extended its operations into Manchester and Oldham. It diversified into stage carriage services in 1921. On 1 October 1928, an express service linking Blackpool with London commenced. In 1930 the business was placed in administration. In March 1931, a consortium of Maurice Edwards, John Barlow and Herbert Allen purchased the business. On 9 April 1932, the company was officially renamed Yelloway Motor Services Limited.

Yelloway was granted operating licences for a service to Torquay, with other operators denied. By 1937, Yelloway was providing travel facilities for passengers from West Yorkshire to destinations in South West England, connecting services being provided by Ripponden & District through Halifax, Sowerby Bridge and Ripponden to Oldham where they joined the Devon bound coaches.

World War II caused the curtailment of a number of services, including the London express. In 1944, Maurice Edwards indicated his desire to sell his stake. In order that no additional borrowing was undertaken, which may have put the company into debt, the Manchester to Rochdale service was sold on 18 June 1944 to Manchester, Rochdale and Oldham Corporations.

In 1947, Yelloway acquired the operation of Brierley Brothers, Rochdale which included tour and excursion licences and an express route to North Wales from Rochdale and Oldham. In 1955, Holts of Oldham was purchased. This business had been set up by the original founders of Holt Brothers because of licensing difficulties in Oldham and, although at one time it had been planned to merge the two operations this had never been done and the Oldham company had continued to trade separately.

Blue Bird Tours, Hollinwood was also acquired, including excursions licences from the Oldham area and a number of express services, including a Hyde to Cleveleys route, which was retained, although the Oldham to Market Drayton service was sold to the North Western Road Car Company. In 1959, Yelloway acquired three more operators, taking over the businesses of the Rossendale Division Carriage Company, Johnston Bros (Middleton), and Merriway Tours.

In 1961, the excursion licences of Turner Brothers, Todmorden were purchased, followed in 1964 by the excursion licences of Chas Holt & Sons, Whitworth, Kershaws Luxury Tours of Rochdale in 1967. In 1968 the related businesses of William Makinson (Manchester) Limited and North Manchester Motor Coaches Limited were acquired, in addition to excursion licences the latter company held express service licences to Blackpool and North Wales.

In 1976 an agreement was reached with National Bus Company that saw Yelloway relinquish its London express routes in return National Bus Company's interests in the Fylde Coast Pool were handed over to Yelloway, which became the sole operator on the routes.

In January 1984, following a revision by National Express, routes were allocated service numbers;

- 841: Rochdale to Poole (jointly with National Express)
- 845: Rochdale to Swansea (jointly with National Express)
- 877: Blackburn to Clacton-on-Sea (jointly with Premier Travel)
- 878: Blackpool to Clacton-on-Sea (jointly with Premier Travel)
- 883: Rochdale to Plymouth
- 884: Rochdale to Paignton
- 885: Rochdale to Bournemouth
- 886: Rochdale to Southampton
- 890: Burnley to Paignton

On 5 July 1985, Yelloway was sold to Neoplan dealer Carlton PSV Sales of Rotherham. In October 1986, following deregulation, Yelloway registered several stage carriage services in the Greater Manchester area and won contracts from the Greater Manchester Passenger Transport Executive.

By 1987 the services run jointly with Premier Travel were no longer operating and National Express services had replaced them. Instead, Yelloway was contracted to run two journeys a day on the Burnley to Harwich services 351 and 352. Most of the remaining coach work undertaken by Yelloway at this time was under contract to National Express and this was transferred to Carlton PSV Sales' parent ATL Holdings newly acquired National Travel East subsidiary along with most of the coach fleet. The last remaining vestige of the Yelloway express network was the Blackpool route through Oldham and Rochdale areas, but by late 1988 this too had gone.

In return a motley collection of second-hand vehicles came to Yelloway to operate the stage carriage services. By late 1988, Yelloway Motor Services had been reduced to a run down local service operator. Maintenance problems with the ageing fleet resulted in a number of buses being put off the road. Greater Manchester and West Yorkshire Passenger Transport Executives cancelled contracts on several services because of poor performance. On 24 November 1988, the Yelloway was placed under the control of Crosville Motor Services, which had just been purchased by ATL Holdings, along with the remaining contract work and the name disappeared.

== Museum ==
A Yelloway mobile museum, housed in a former Yelloway coach, was formed in 2002 by enthusiast David Haddock. It is now owned by Paul Blackburn and is based at the Bury Transport Museum.

== Revival ==
In 2008, Courtesy Coaches bought the rights to the Yelloway name, and currently use it on a fleet of 15 coaches. In 2008, it won a contract to provide transport for the Rochdale Hornets rugby league team.
