= Crosville Motor Services =

Bus operator in North Wales and North West England

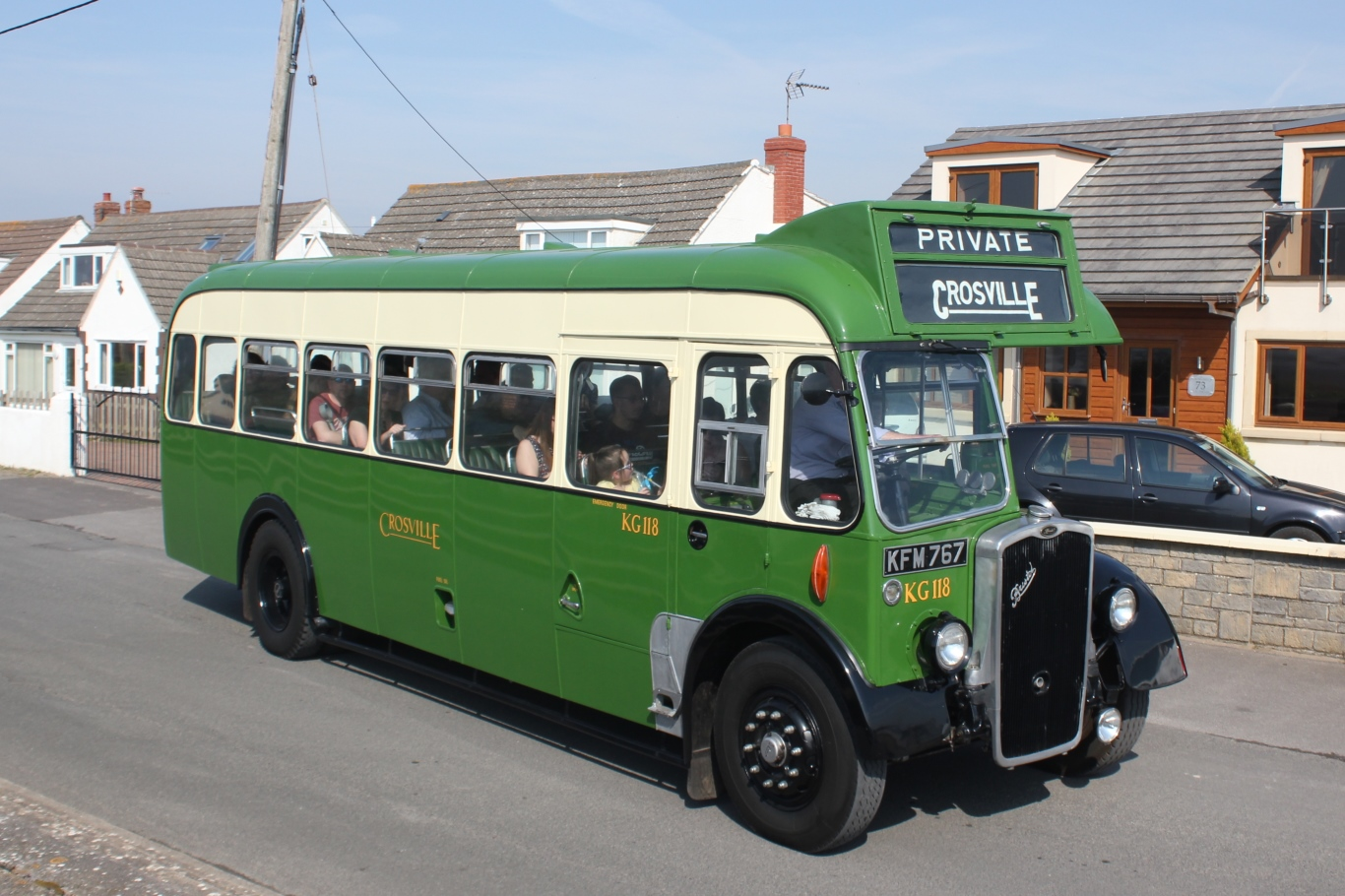
- Preserved ECW bodied Bristol L in Sand Bay, Somerset, in April 2018
- Founded: 27 October 1906; 119 years ago
- Ceased operation: February 1990; 36 years ago (England); January 1998; 28 years ago (Wales)
- Headquarters: Chester, Cheshire, England
- Service area: Cheshire; Lancashire; Flintshire; North-mid Wales; Liverpool
- Service type: Bus and coach
- Fleet: 841 (December 1985)

Crosville Motor Services was a bus operator based in the north-west of England and north and mid-Wales.

== History ==
On 27 October 1906, Crosville Motor Company was formed in Chester by George Crosland Taylor and his French business associate Georges de Ville, with the intention of building motor cars. The company name was a portmanteau on the names of the founders.

In 1911, Crosville commenced its first bus service, an 8 miles (13 km) service between Chester and Ellesmere Port using a Lacre motorbus. By 1927, Crosville had consolidated an operating area covering the Wirral Peninsula and parts of Lancashire, Cheshire and Flintshire, operating a fleet of over 250 motorbuses predominantly manufactured by Leyland Motors.

Under the terms of the Railways (Road Transport) Act 1928, allowing for the Big Four British railway companies to provide bus services, in August 1929, the London, Midland and Scottish Railway purchased Crosville Motor Services for £398,750 (equivalent to £21,902,000 in 2025), equivalent to 27s. 6d. per share of the company. The new LMS (Crosville) company then purchased Holyhead Motors and UNU Motor Services of Caernarfon over the next few months. Shortly afterwards, the 'Big Four' reached an agreement with the Tilling Group and British Automobile Traction (T&BAT) to complete a cross-holding deal, whereby each organisation held a 50% share in a series of jointly-held and consolidated regional bus companies. LMS (Crosville) was therefore merged with T&BAT's Royal Blue of Llandudno, and renamed Crosville Motor Services on 15 May 1930, after only nine months of outright LMS ownership.

In the next few months the company consolidated its majority share of the North Wales coastal services, buying up various smaller private companies that operated in the Crosville area, including: White Rose Motor Services of Rhyl, Red Dragon of Denbigh, Burton of Tarporley, North Wales Silver Motors and Llangoed Red Motors. On 1 May 1933, Western Transport of Wrexham, the Great Western Railway's northern Welsh road service, was amalgamated with Crosville, making Crosville Motor Services the fourth largest bus operator in the United Kingdom.

In 1930, All-British Travels Ltd was formed by coach operators George Taylor of Chester, Alfred Harding of Birkenhead and J.W. Scott of Edinburgh, with sleeping partner Evan R. Davies, a solicitor in Pwllheli. Under the fleet name of 'All-British Line', the initial intention was to run express coach services to and from Liverpool and Llandudno to London via Taylor's Market Square car showroom in Chester, operating a central London travel agency to advertise those services and the other coach services of the respective companies. This express coach service to London commenced on 14 April 1930.

Crosville had also started an express coach service between Liverpool and London in 1929, and by 1933, tried with All-British Travels Ltd to co-ordinate the Liverpool to London service, thereby complying with the North Western Traffic Commissioner's decree to reduce the duplication of that service. A joint timetable was worked on, but problems co-ordinating the service proved impossible to surmount. In January 1933, the coach operator, Red & White Services of Chepstow in South Wales, purchased All-British Travels Ltd and in September of that year, the remaining All-British Line express coach service between Liverpool and London operated by Taylor ceased. Taylor continued in the coach excursion business and car trade in Chester up to 1972.

Although the start of the Second World War brought about cuts in the company timetable, by the end of the war, the company had increased passengers by 50% and revenues by 90%. This was through North Wales being seen as a safe area from Luftwaffe bombing, resulting in a number of shadow factories and munitions factories being built in the area. This resulted in the expansion of a number of formerly quiet villages, and hence the route map changed quite dramatically: for example, ROF Wrexham, Marchwiel needed over 200 buses daily. This passenger demand brought about a change in fleet policy, with the relatively small double deck fleet being considerably expanded, mostly with second-hand vehicles as production capacity at most bus manufacturers had been given over meet the requirements of the military.

On 3 December 1942, Crosville became a subsidiary of the Tilling Group. The change of ownership resulted in a change from maroon to 'Tilling Green' livery and Bristol-chassised buses replacing Leyland as the manufacturer of choice.

=== Nationalisation ===
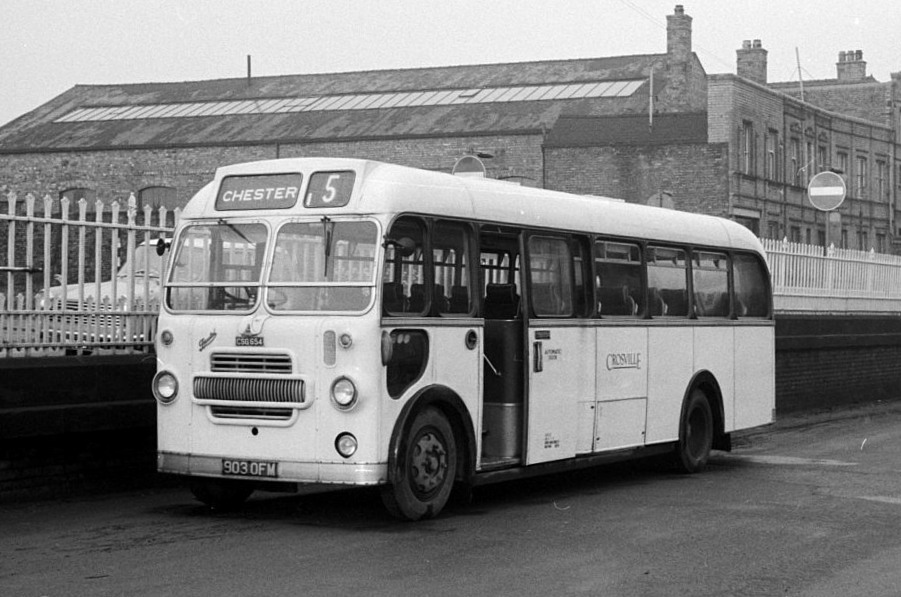
ECW bodied Bristol SC at Chester Northgate railway station in January 1967

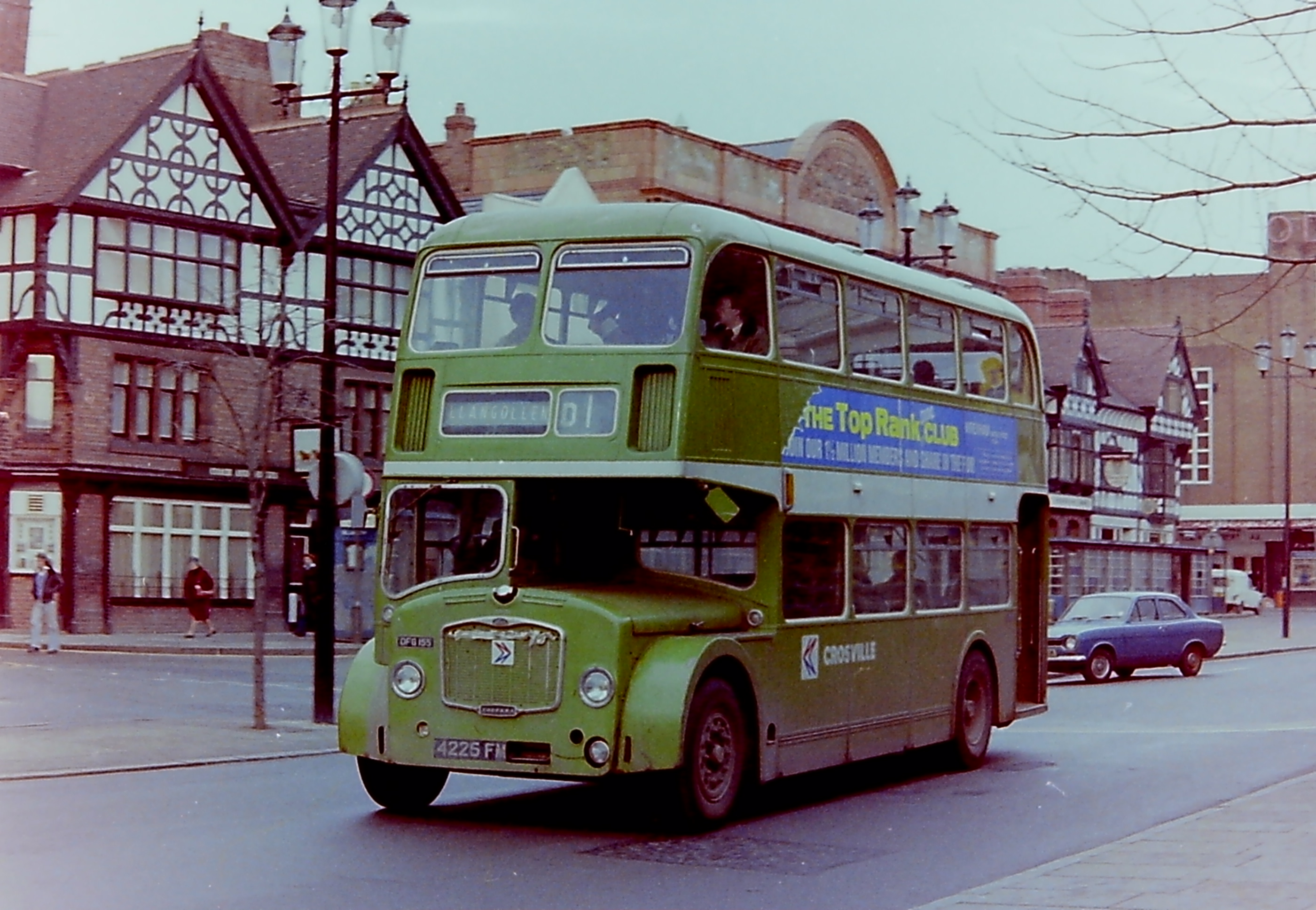
ECW bodied Bristol Lodekka in National Bus Company livery in Chester in March 1979

Crosville emerged from the war far stronger in many ways, with healthy cash reserves in the bank or accumulating in property assets, unable to replace their fleet at their normal renewal rate. However, although Crosville focused on replacing its single-deck fleet with double deckers, Tilling had a group policy against investment in coaches, resulting in a rise across the geography of a number of new coach operators. By the time that the post-war government of Clement Attlee merged both Tilling and the railway companies into the British Transport Commission on 1 January 1948, nationalising Crosville, the coach operators were a sustainable competitive entity.

New Bristol double-deckers had become the standard fleet purchase for all Tilling/BET fleets, which allowed the company to serve the post-war boom until 1950, when traffic began to fall again thanks to the increase in the number of private cars. The combination of this, plus the Suez Crisis of 1956 and a lack of staff due to low wages, led to a general contraction of the network of countryside routes, Sunday services being halved and concessionary fares being abolished. The network continued to decline, except in the provision of a new service to replace railways removed by the Beeching cuts, the "Cymru Coastliner", introduced on 5 September 1965 between Chester and Caernarfon, anticipating the closure of the British Rail route and the intermediate stations serving both towns.

Crosville was among the BET operators that passed into the ownership of the state-owned National Bus Company (NBC) on 1 January 1969, following the passage of the Transport Act 1968. The Act also introduced the principle that rural bus services could be subsidised by councils. Although they had reduced costs by the introduction of one-person operation, Crosville submitted a list of 196 routes that required financial assistance. By 1971, Crosville was on the verge of bankruptcy, which was only avoided with the approval of a controversial fares increase by the Traffic Commissioner for North West England.

With the transfer of North Western Road Car Company routes operated within Greater Manchester to the newly-formed SELNEC Passenger Transport Executive in 1971, the NBC split the residual services of North Western between Trent and Crosville, with the latter taking over 119 vehicles and depots in the Cheshire towns of Northwich, Macclesfield and Biddulph in March 1972. A consolidation of companies within the NBC resulted in Crosville taking over services in parts of West Wales from Western Welsh, including those from the depots in New Quay, Newcastle Emlyn and Lampeter.

The company continued to consolidate and reduce its network through the 1980s, making losses of £1 million (equivalent to £4,291,000 in 2025) in 1980 and £2 million (equivalent to £7,710,000 in 2025) in 1981. Rebranding of local services in metropolitan areas, such as 'South Cheshire' for services Crewe and Nantwich and 'TransPort' for services in Ellesmere Port, assisted in flattening the rate of decline in revenues, but losses continued to mount.

=== Deregulation and split ===
By December 1985, Crosville was operating a fleet of 841 buses and coaches across north west England and north Wales. On 13 February 1986, Secretary of State for Transport Nicholas Ridley decided that, because of their size, the four largest NBC companies would be split, as they provided too great a competitive threat to deregulation. Crosville was split into two, with the English and Welsh operations divided between two businesses.

==== Crosville Cymru ====
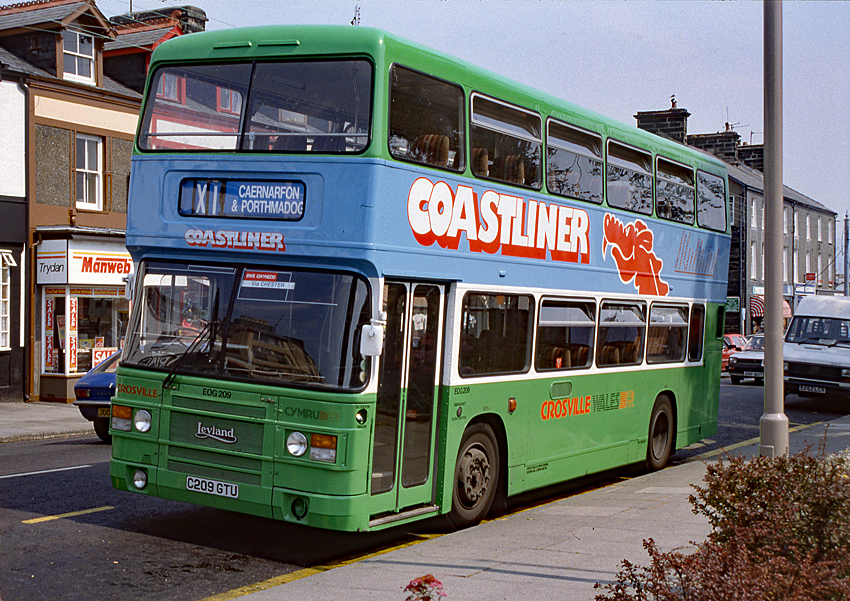
Crosville Cymru ECW bodied Leyland Olympian on the "Cymru Coastliner" service in Porthmadog in July 1989

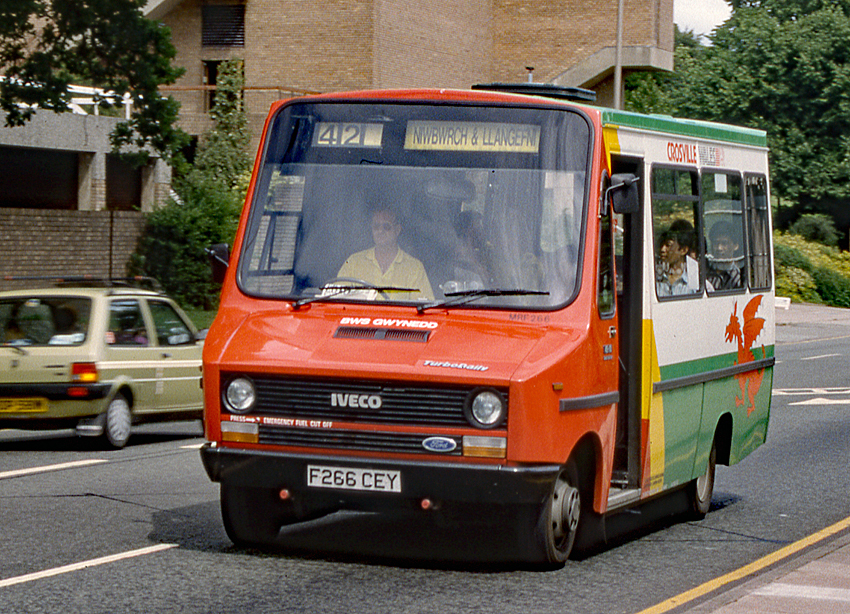
Crosville Cymru Iveco Daily minibus in Bangor in July 1989

The Welsh and Oswestry depots were split into a new company, Crosville Cymru Ltd, headquartered at Llandudno Junction depot and established with a fleet of 470 buses, minibuses and coaches operating from 17 depots and outstations, which was sold by the NBC to a management buyout team in January 1988. A year later in January 1989, Crosville Cymru was sold to National Express for £6 million (equivalent to £15,876,000 in 2025).

In October 1990, 120 workers at Crosville Cymru's Wrexham depot affiliated with the Transport and General Workers' Union (TGWU) walked out on strike following the suspension of the depot's TGWU branch secretary and two shop stewards. A week into the strike, the striking Wrexham workers were dismissed by Crosville Cymru for breach of contract after a new wage offer by the company was rejected by the TGWU, and by the end of November, the company announced it was taking legal action against the TGWU for 'misleading its members' and had begun the process of closing the depot. Following a major fleet reduction and a loss of services to independent Wrights of Wrexham, the strike ended after four months when Wrexham depot closed on 25 February 1991, with police being called to reports of graffiti sprayed in the depot and bus tyres being punctured.

As part of the purchase of National Express by the Drawlane Group in July 1991, Crosville Cymru, alongside Liverpool-based Amberline, were moved by Drawlane into a new shelf company named Catchdeluxe Limited. After a period of uncertainty in which Crosville Cymru withdrew from National Express coaching work, transferring operations to Amberline and seeing a small number of redundancies, and had its Oswestry depot and an outstation in Abermule taken over by Drawlane subsidiary Midland Red North, losing 31 buses in the changeover, Crosville Cymru changed hands to British Bus following the splitting of the Drawlane Group's bus operations to the new management-owned company in December 1992.

In August 1996, British Bus was purchased by the Cowie Group. A year later in November 1997, Cowie rebranded to Arriva and adopted a corporate aquamarine and cream livery, with Crosville Cymru rebranding to Arriva Cymru. This operation continued until February 2002, when it merged with Arriva North West to form Arriva North West & Wales. It now forms part of Arriva Buses Wales.

==== Crosville in England ====
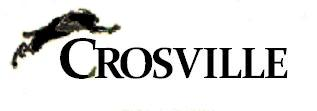
Logo used for Crosville operations in England until 1990

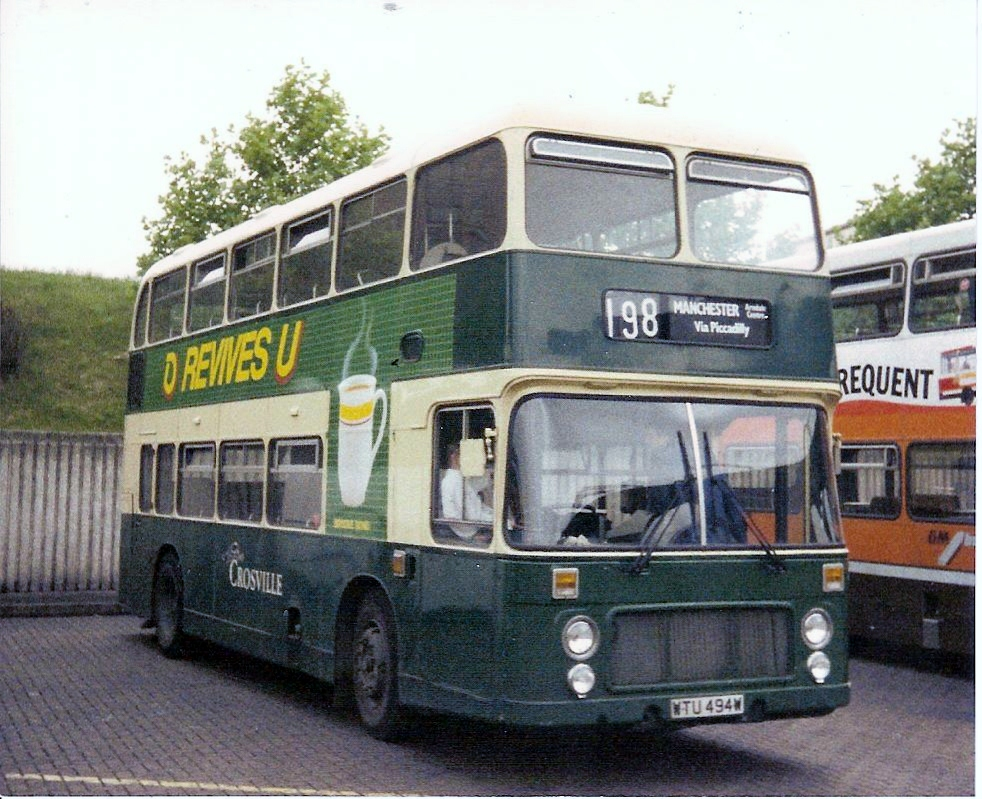
Crosville Eastern Coach Works bodied Bristol VRT at Stockport bus station

Operations in England remained under the original Crosville Motor Services licence, retaining the headquarters in Chester. On 25 March 1988, Crosville was sold to ATL (Western). Some depot reorganisation took place, with Heswall closing in September 1988 and West Kirby reopening. Expansion in Greater Manchester soon followed when Crosville took over the operations of fellow subsidiary Yelloway of Rochdale in November 1988 after it ran into difficulties. ATL (Western) ownership, however, lasted less than a year with Crosville being sold to Salisbury based Drawlane Group in February 1989.

Drawlane already owned the neighbouring North Western Road Car Company and Midland Red North companies, and although Drawlane initially planned to run Crosville as a separate company, after acquiring the Bee Line Buzz Company in October 1989 from Stagecoach Holdings and East Midland Motor Services, they took the opportunity to reorganise Crosville's operations. In November 1989, Drawlane split the majority of Crosville's depots between its sister companies:

- Bredbury, Congleton, Macclesfield and Rochdale depots passed to the Bee Line Buzz Company; Congleton and Macclesfield rebranded services under the C-Line name, retaining Crosville's dark green and cream livery
- Crewe and Etruria depots passed to Midland Red North
- Runcorn and Warrington depots passed to North Western

Following the closure of West Kirby garage and the transfer of Northwich garage to North Western in January 1990, the remaining depots at Chester, Rock Ferry and Ellesmere Port, along with the Crosville brand, were sold to Potteries Motor Traction in February 1990. The Crosville name continued until services were rebranded as First Chester & The Wirral ten years later. Following losses, First sold the business, along with depots in Chester, Rock Ferry and Wrexham, to Stagecoach Merseyside and South Lancashire in December 2012.

With six minibuses not required by the new depot owners left for disposal and the Crosville brand sold to Potteries Motor Traction, the rump of the original company was renamed North British Bus Ltd in March 1990, finally being dissolved in April 2013.

== Revival ==
The Crosville Motor Service name was resurrected by a new operator that operated in Weston-super-Mare from 2011 until 2018. As well as modern vehicles, it had a heritage fleet which included several vehicles from the original Crosville fleet.

The Crosville Cymru / Crosville Wales Limited name also exists but not with Arriva. Gwasanaethau Cerbyd Crosville Motor Services Limited also exists. The word 'Gwasanaethau' is the Welsh for 'Services' and the word 'Cerbyd' is Welsh for 'Vehicle'. Both company names are registered as dormant companies in Wales.
