= Ribble Motor Services =

Former bus company in North West England

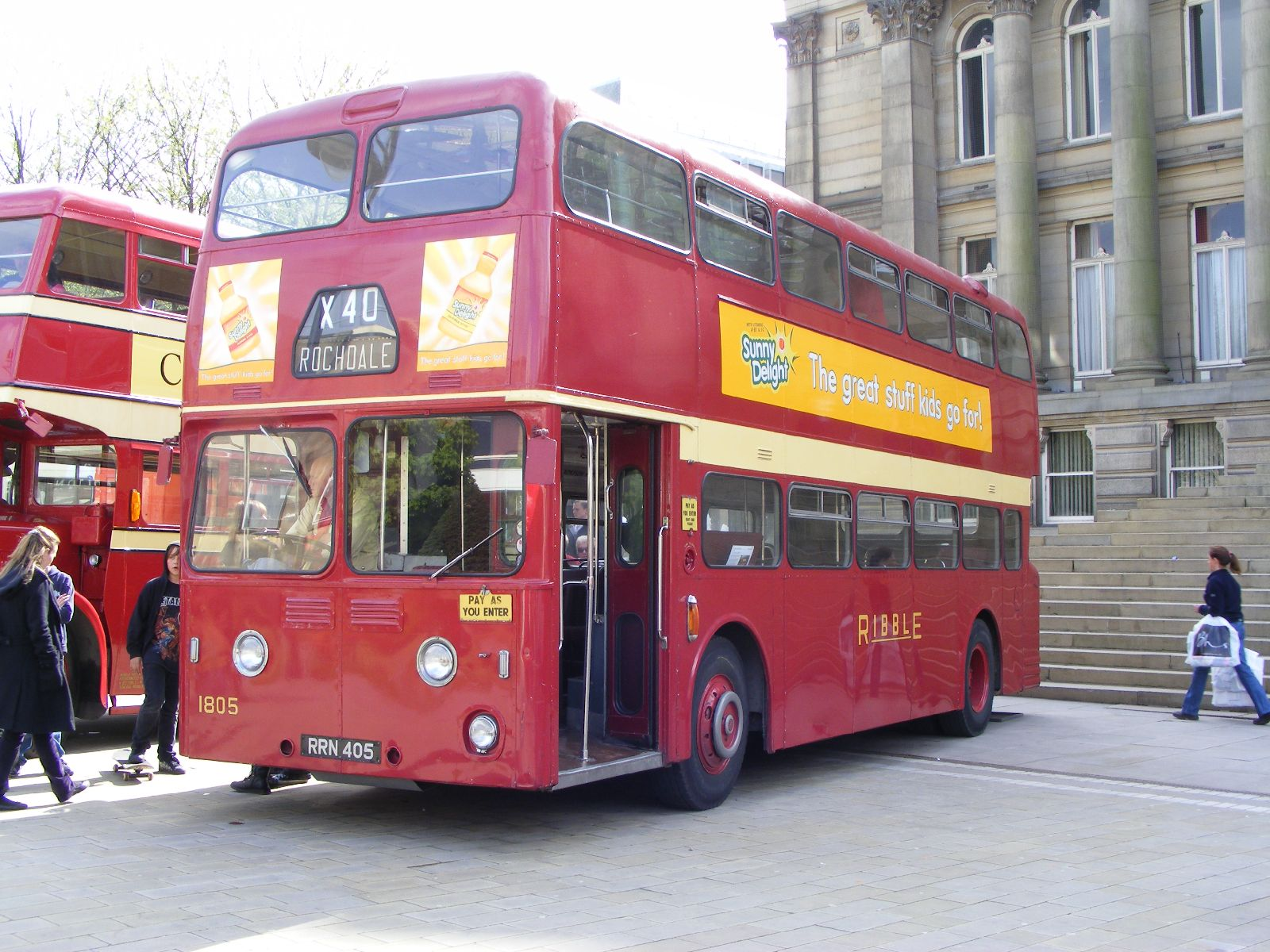
- Preserved Metro-Cammell bodied Leyland Atlantean in Bolton town centre in May 2009
- Founded: May 1919; 107 years ago
- Ceased operation: May 1989; 37 years ago
- Headquarters: Preston
- Service area: Lancashire; Cumbria; Merseyside; Greater Manchester
- Service type: Bus operator

Ribble Motor Services was a large regional bus operator in North West England based in Preston.

== History ==
Ribble Motor Services commenced operations in May 1919 following the acquisition of a depot consisting of four double-decker and one single-deck bus in Gregson Lane; bus services operated out of the depot consisted of services from Preston to Gregson Lane, Bamber Bridge, Higher Walton and Longridge. In 1920 the British Automobile Traction Co., a subsidiary of British Electric Traction (BET) acquired a significant shareholding in Ribble, which it maintained until the sale to the government in 1968. Multiple companies were acquired throughout the 1920s and 1930s, including W. C. Standerwick of Blackpool in 1934, which was eventually rationalised as the name used for Ribble's coach excursion operations, and Ribble Motor Services soon grew to be the largest operator in the region, with a territory eventually stretching from Carlisle in Cumberland to southern Lancashire at the company's peak.

In 1961, the Scout Motor Services business was purchased, initially organised as a subsidiary of Ribble Motor Services. Scout's operations were later absorbed into both Ribble and W.C. Standerwick in 1968.

On 1 January 1969, Ribble Motor Services, then a subsidiary of British Electric Traction, passed into the ownership of the state-owned National Bus Company following the passing of the Transport Act 1968.

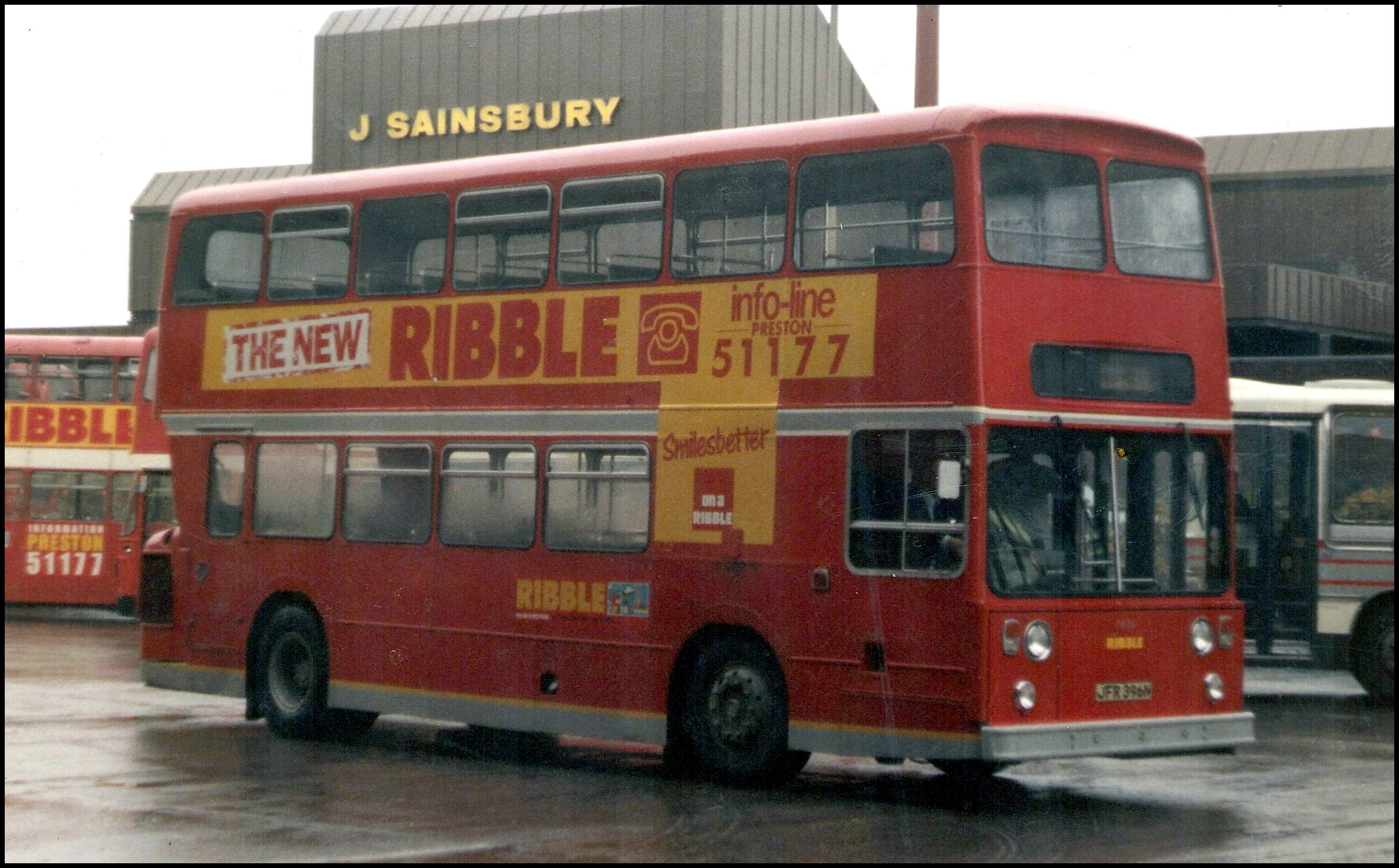
East Lancashire Coachbuilders bodied Leyland Atlantean in Ribble's deregulation livery in 1986

Prior to the deregulation of bus services in 1986, Ribble's territory was reduced with the company's north Cumbrian operations passing to Cumberland Motor Services and Merseyside operations to a recreated North Western. As part of the privatisation of the National Bus Company, Ribble was sold on 2 March 1988 in a management buyout. In April 1989, Ribble was purchased by Stagecoach Holdings.

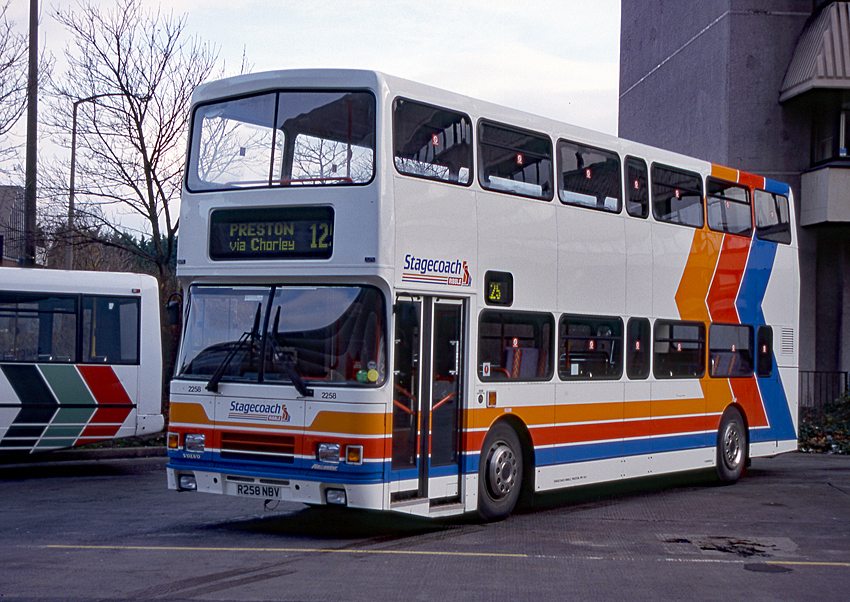
Stagecoach Ribble Alexander bodied Volvo Olympian at Preston bus station in November 1997

The following May, Barrow Borough Transport was purchased by Stagecoach Ribble, and shortly afterwards, the company's Cumbrian operations based from depots in Kendal, Barrow-in-Furness and Ulverston were transferred to fellow Stagecoach subsidiary CMS Cumberland, leaving Stagecoach Ribble with operations only in Lancashire and Greater Manchester. Stagecoach Ribble went on to acquire the depot and 20 vehicles from the fleet of Lancaster City Transport in 1993, followed by the operations of Hyndburn Transport in 1996.

In April 2001, Stagecoach sold the Ribble operations in Blackburn, Hyndburn, Clitheroe and Bolton to the Blazefield Group for £13 million, which rebranded them as Lancashire United and Burnley & Pendle.

As a subsidiary of Stagecoach, the company remained registered as Ribble Motor Services. Its services were operated under the trading name Ribble Buses, then as Stagecoach Ribble, Stagecoach in Lancashire (which became part of Stagecoach North West) and finally as part of Stagecoach Merseyside & South Lancashire. Its bus routes were transferred to Glenvale Transport Ltd (formerly Stagecoach Merseyside) in 2013. In 2021, Stagecoach Merseyside & South Lancashire changed their trading name from Glenvale Transport Limited to Ribble Motor Services Limited to reflect heritage of the Ribble brand.

== Services ==
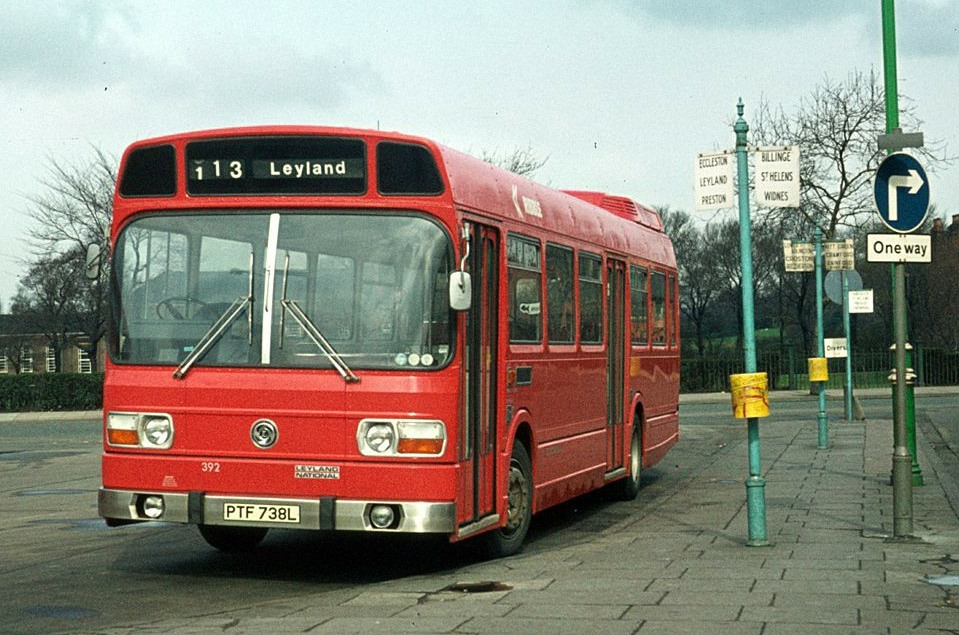
A Ribble Leyland National at Wigan bus station in April 1973

Upon the creation of the National Bus Company in January 1969, Ribble Motor Services gained the Carlisle operations of United Automobile Services, which too had joined the National Bus Company. United had established a presence in Carlisle in 1931, building a depot on Scotch Street in 1938, which was acquired by Ribble Motor Services alongside United's bus services in the city.

Ribble Motor Services was one of several operators to operate in the Merseyside region in the 1950s and 1960s, following the acquisition of a number of bus operators in the area. Following the acquisition of Waterloo and Crosby Motor Services, Ribble operated 12 'L'-prefixed services from Liverpool to Waterloo, Crosby, Hall Road and Thornton via Bootle and Seaforth. Operating for nineteen hours a day, these services had bus frequencies that varied between every seven minutes to every 30 minutes. Joint agreements for Ribble Motor Services to run bus services across both Liverpool as well as St Helens were made by both cities' respective corporations' transport departments on several occasions. In January 1972, Ribble signed an agency agreement with Merseyside Passenger Transport Executive, giving the Executive in the PTE area control of Ribble's services. Much rationalisation of both operators' activities took place in the north Merseyside area, but Ribble buses kept to their traditional areas. In the run-up to deregulation in 1986, Ribble's depots at Bootle, Southport, Aintree, Wigan and Liverpool were transferred to a new company, North Western Road Car.

=== Express services ===
Ribble Motor Services was notable for operating a number of express bus and coach services across Great Britain. In the early 1930s, after reaching inter-working agreements with various regional bus operators in both England and Scotland, Ribble began serving destinations such as Barnsley, Carlisle, Doncaster, Edinburgh, Glasgow, Halifax, Huddersfield, Leeds, Newcastle upon Tyne, Middlesbrough, Scarborough and Wakefield.

==== 'White Lady' ====
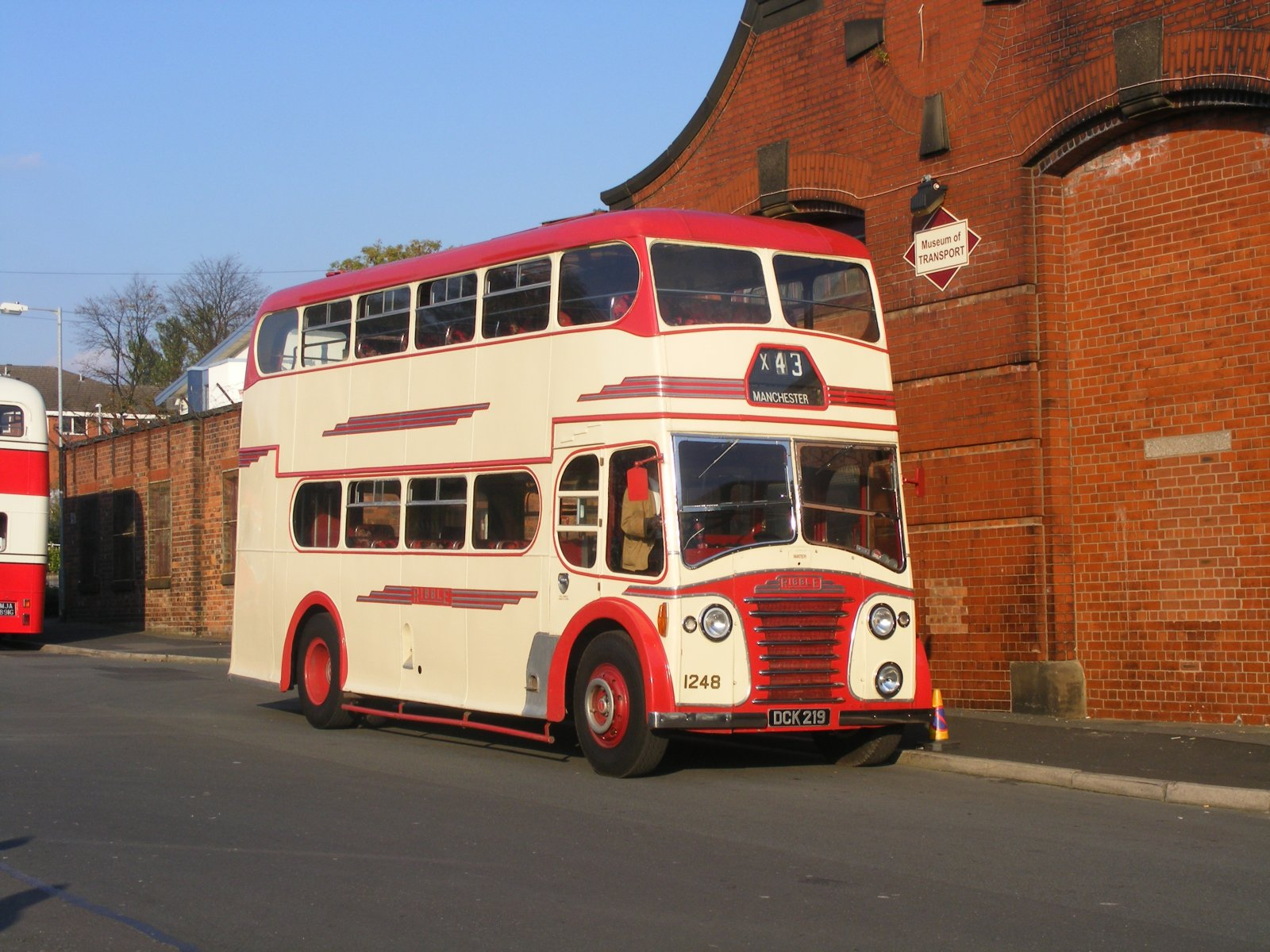
Preserved 'White Lady' East Lancashire Coachbuilders bodied Leyland Titan PD2

Ribble Motor Services, as well as the North Western Road Car Company and Lancashire United Transport, jointly operated the service X60 and X70 between Manchester, Bolton, Chorley, Preston and Blackpool. This joint operation, first started in 1928, was known as the world's most frequent express service in the 1960s, maintaining a scheduled departure every fifteen minutes in the summer.

Ribble Motor Services made use of double-deck coaches known as 'White Ladies' for this service, first introduced in the form of a combination of Burlingham and later East Lancashire Coachbuilders-bodied 8 feet (2.4 m) wide Leyland Titan PD2s in the late 1940s.

Throughout the 1950s the 'White Ladies' ran on all the major express and limited stop services out of Lower Mosley Street, Manchester. In particular they served the routes due north including X3 & X13 to Great Harwood, X23 Clitheroe, X43 Skipton and Colne, X53 Burnley, and X66 Blackburn. They also ran on the X27 service from Liverpool to Skipton via Southport.

In 1962, the 'White Lady' Leyland Titan PD2s were replaced by 20 Leyland Atlanteans with coach-seated Weymann bodies. As the buses were used on medium-distance express services as opposed to long-distance services, no toilet facility was carried, increasing seating capacity on the coaches from 50 to 59. These 'White Lady' Atlanteans were retained into NBC ownership, albeit eventually downgraded to service buses by the application of standard NBC livery.

==== 'Gay Hostess' ====
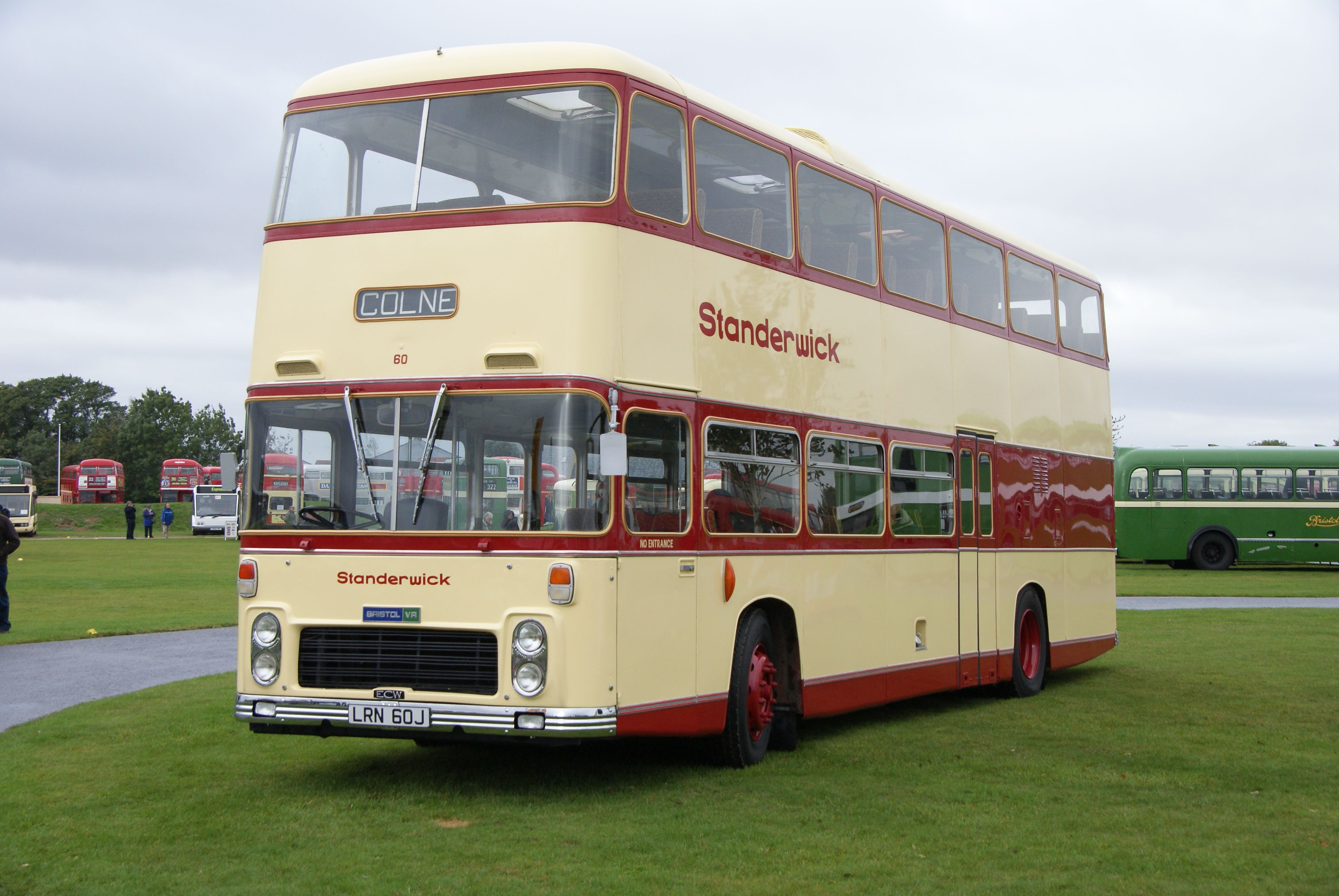
A preserved Standerwick Bristol VRL coach used on motorway express services

Motorways were developed in the late 1950s, and in 1958, the M6 Preston Bypass, located within Ribble Motor Services' operating area, was opened as the first motorway in the United Kingdom. In November 1959, Ribble Motor Services were granted authorisation by the Northern Traffic Commissioner to operate a service from Keswick to London's Victoria Coach Station via the new M1 motorway; in order to accommodate long-distance motorway travel, Ribble Motor Services had developed the 'Gay Hostess' double-deck express coach, based on the Leyland Atlantean chassis, featuring 50 reclining seats, a toilet and spaces for luggage. The 'Gay Hostess' Leyland Atlantean coaches were split between Ribble, who operated 15, and subsidiary Standerwick, who operated 22.

To replace the 'Gay Hostess' Atlanteans, a 60-seater double-deck coach built on a Bristol VRL/LH chassis was developed around 1968 for motorway running by the Standerwick subsidiary. The Eastern Coach Works-bodied coach was driven by a Leyland Power Plus 680 engine mounted vertically and longitudinally behind the offside rear axle. In total, 30 Bristol VRL coaches were delivered.

== Fleet ==
The company mainly operated Leyland vehicles, which were built nearby in Leyland, Lancashire. Under the ownership of the National Bus Company, Ribble standardised on Leyland National single-deckers and Leyland Leopard coaches. Two prototype Leyland Olympians with Eastern Coach Works bodies were delivered to Ribble in 1980; Ribble went on to purchase further ECW-bodied Olympians for 'Timesaver' express services between Burnley and Manchester in 1984.

In 1949, Sentinel developed an underfloor-engined single-deck bus, which increased the seating capacity to a total of 40 seats. Ribble took two batches of these buses. In the 1960s, Ribble ordered ten lightweight Bedford coaches for their extended tour fleet.

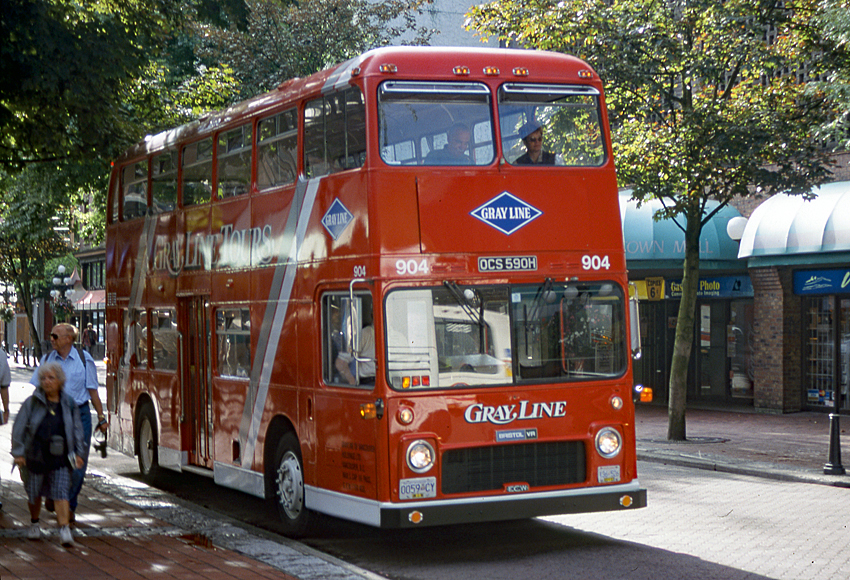
Ex Ribble Bristol VR on sight-seeing tour in Vancouver

A batch of Bristol RELL single-deck buses was delivered to Ribble Motor Services in 1968, shortly before the government brought together Leyland Bus and the National Bus Company into the plan to build the Leyland National bus factory in Cumberland. After the first batch of 10 fitted with Leyland engines showed poor fuel economy, a larger batch of 56 Bristol RESLs equipped with Gardner engines were ordered in 1969. Some Bristol VR double-deckers were also acquired in 1970.

Two batches of the lowbridge Albion Lowlander double-decker bus were purchased by Ribble, all being the LR1 model. These had a fully fronted cab and were a replica of the highbridge PD3s that Ribble operated; they were not popular buses. Ribble acquired a 17th example when they took over Bamber Bridge Motor Services; this was Ribble's only half-cab Lowlander.

== Depots ==
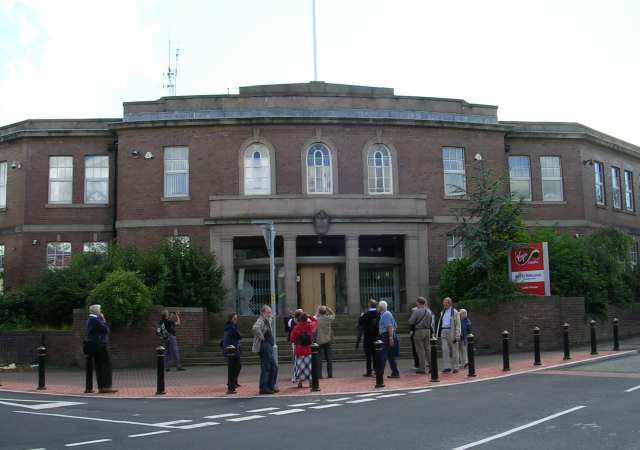
The former Ribble Motor Services headquarters in Preston

Ribble's head office was located on Frenchwood Avenue, Preston, and was opened in 1937. At its peak in 1949, Ribble Motor Services had over 40 depots across Lancashire, Merseyside and Cumbria of varying size and use.

Operations in the Merseyside area were based at depots in Liverpool, Bootle, Seaforth Sands and Aintree in the 1950s. In 1979, a new open-plan depot was brought into use in Bootle 250 yards (230 m) away from the original garage on Hawthorne Road. Bootle depot was acquired by Liverpool independent company Liverline in 1992 and is still in use today by Arriva Merseyside. Other new depots were constructed in Carlisle in 1967, as well as in Skelmersdale in October 1974, replacing an existing site in Ormskirk.

One depot was a former railway terminus, this being the former Southport Lord Street railway station, once owned by the Southport and Cheshire Lines Extension Railway, which had closed in 1952. Ribble Motor Services converted the former railway building into a bus station, which opened in 1954, and later added maintenance facilities to commence the former station's use as Ribble's Southport depot.
