= Cumberland Motor Services =

Bus operator in Cumberland, England

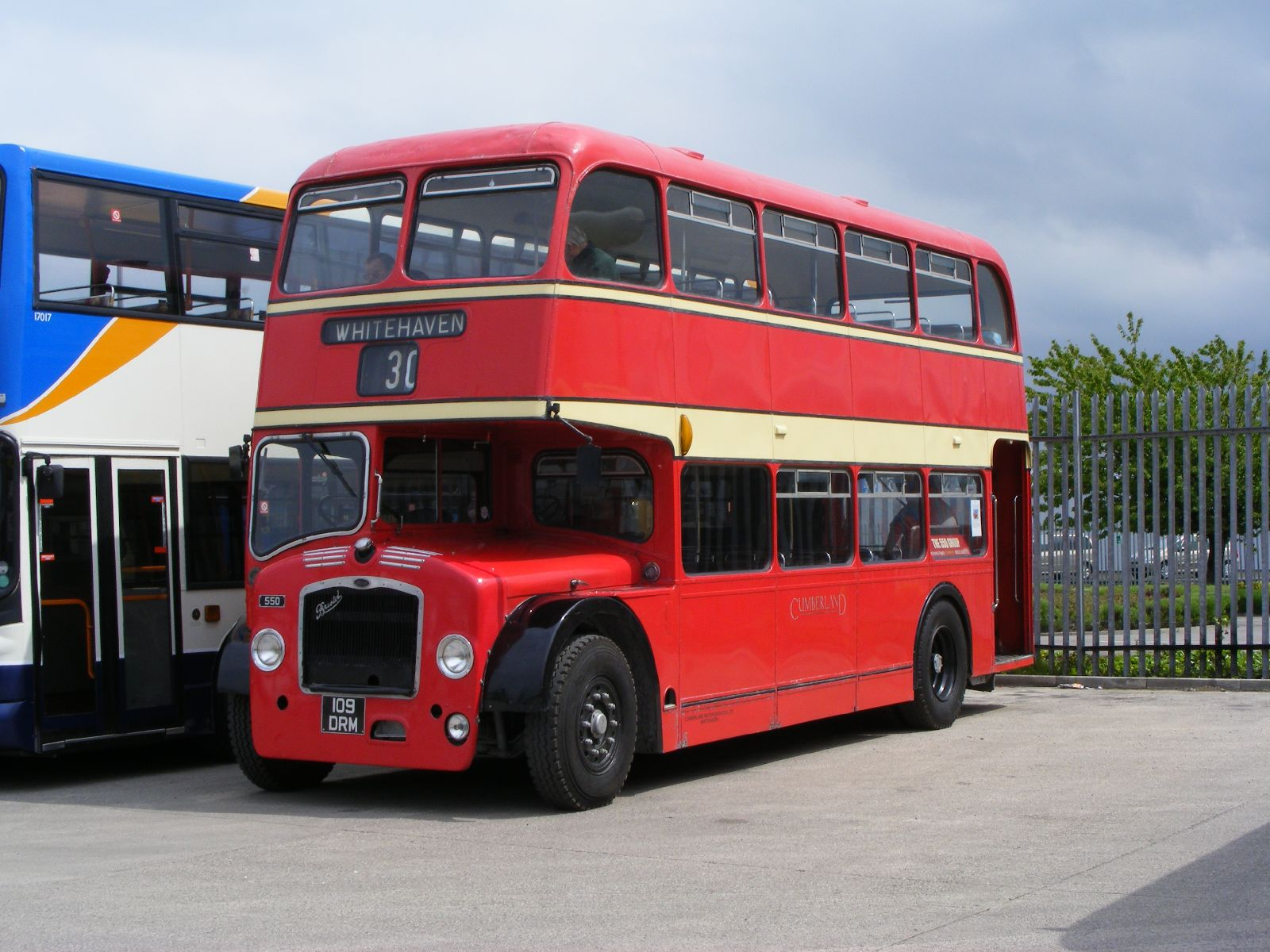
- Preserved Eastern Coach Works bodied Bristol Lodekka in Morecambe in May 2009
- Founded: October 1912; 113 years ago
- Defunct: July 1987; 38 years ago
- Headquarters: Whitehaven, Cumberland, England
- Locale: Cumberland; Parts of Lancashire
- Service type: Bus and coach
- Depots: 7 (July 1987)
- Fleet: 230 (July 1987)

Cumberland Motor Services was a bus operator running services in the county of Cumberland, as well as parts of Lancashire. Founded in 1921, the operator today is a part of the Stagecoach Group and, after a demerger from Stagecoach North West, currently trades as Stagecoach Cumbria and North Lancashire.

== History ==
In October 1912, the Whitehaven Motor Service Company began operating a bus service between the town of Whitehaven and Cleator Moor using a fleet of Arrol-Johnston motorbuses purchased second-hand. After the company expanded to operate services from Whitehaven to Carlisle, Cockermouth, Egremont, Keswick and Maryport, the company was renamed to Cumberland Motor Services on 1 June 1921 after British Electric Traction subsidiary British Automobile Traction (BAT) acquired a 50% shareholding in the company.

On 19 March 1926, Cumberland Motor Services opened the Workington bus station, the first purpose-built covered bus station in the United Kingdom. Other stations were opened by Cumberland in the towns of Carlisle, Keswick, Maryport and Wigton, with the first two stations operated in joint partnership with fellow BAT subsidiary Ribble Motor Services.

In November 1948, Cumberland Motor Services, then owned by the Tilling Group, became a part of the bus operations of the nationalised British Transport Commission when Tilling sold its operations to the government. After passing to the Transport Holding Company (THC) following the BTC's abolition under the provisions of the Transport Act 1962, Cumberland was later among the THC operators that passed into the ownership of the state-owned National Bus Company (NBC) on 1 January 1969, following the passage of the Transport Act 1968.

=== Yeowart's controversy ===
The passage of the Transport Act 1980 allowed for the deregulation of coach services across the United Kingdom and also allowed local authorities to deregulate their bus services on a trial basis. In August 1981, Secretary of State for Transport Norman Fowler permitted Whitehaven independent coach operator John Yeowart, trading as Yeowart's, a licence to begin operating a town bus service in direct competition with Cumberland Motor Services.

In retaliation, Cumberland engaged in an early 'bus war' with Yeowart's by drafting in additional buses to Whitehaven to compete on the service, fitting them with yellow destination blinds and 'Havenlink' fleetnames to distinguish them from regular Cumberland services. Cumbria County Council made an appeal to the Divisional Court the following October, claiming Fowler had acted unlawfully by issuing Yeowart's licence to operate, forcing Yeowart's to delay the addition of Sunday and additional Friday services to their Whitehaven town service.

In June 1982, the Divisional Court ruled that Yeowart's competing services could remain in operation, however this decision was reversed by the Court of Appeal in January 1983, resulting in Yeowart's town services being suspended with immediate effect. A second attempt by Yeowart's to operate competitive bus services in Whitehaven was rejected by the Northern Traffic Commissioners in May 1983, with John Yeowart being condemned for having 'very little respect for the law' after having knowingly operated unauthorised bus services in Whitehaven before Yeowart's January 1983 service ban.

=== Stagecoach ownership ===
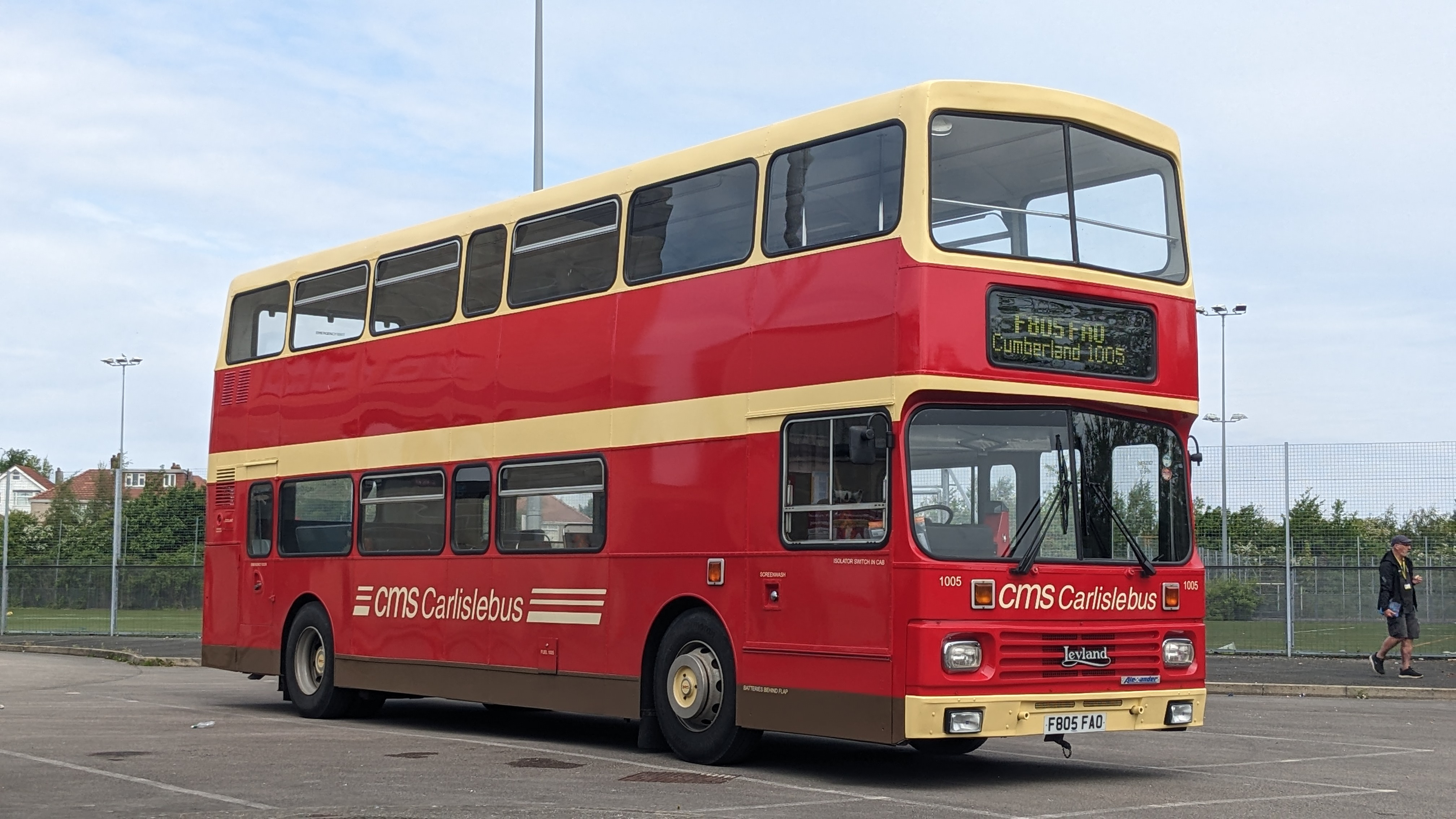
Preserved CMS Carlislebus Alexander bodied Leyland Olympian in Morecambe in May 2023

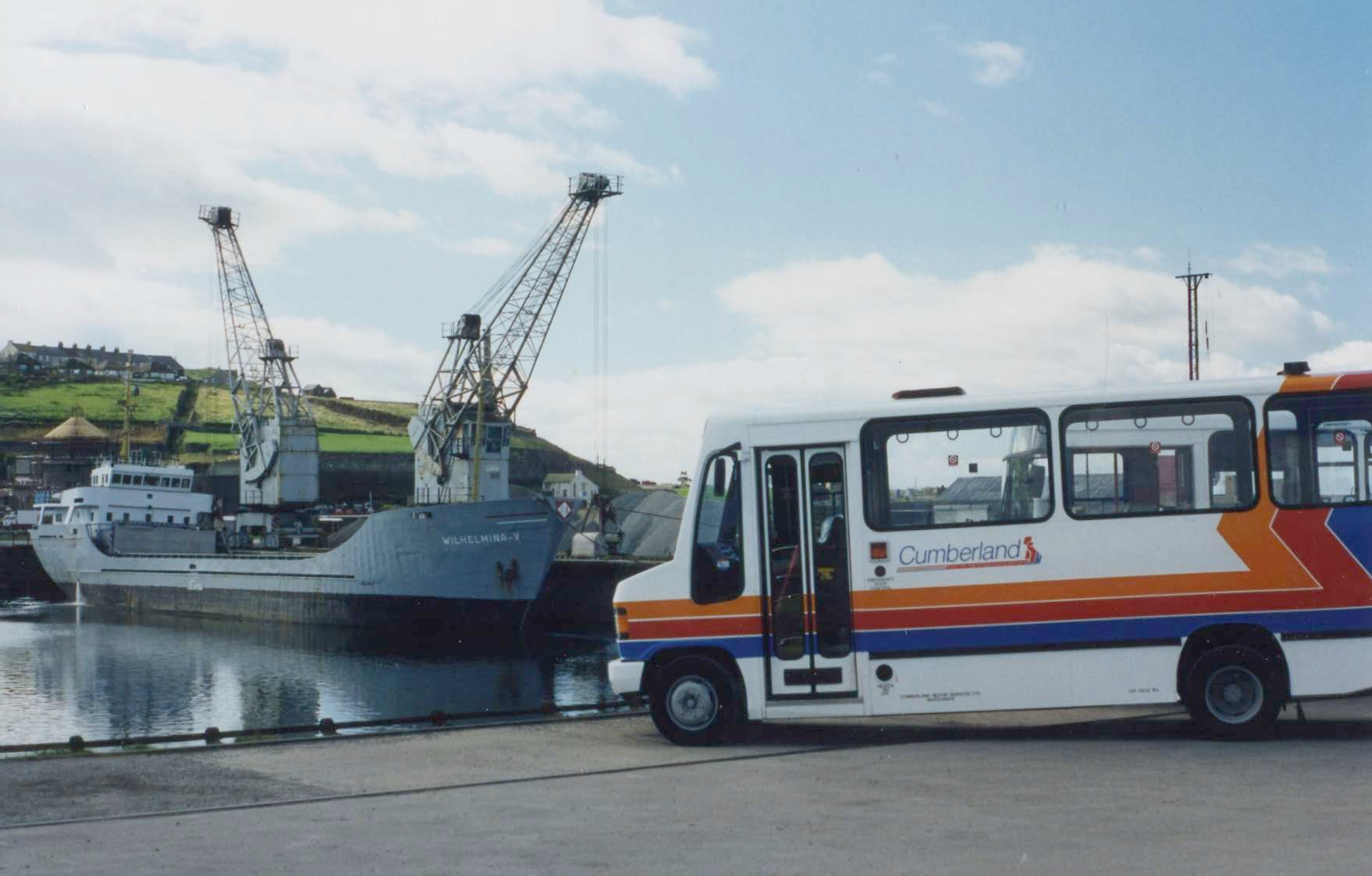
Stagecoach Cumberland Alexander Sprint bodied Mercedes-Benz 709D minibus at Whitehaven Harbour in October 1994

Prior to the deregulation of bus services and ensuing break-up of the National Bus Company in 1986 following the passage of the Transport Act 1985, Cumberland's operating area was expanded further into North Cumbria by the NBC, with Ribble Motor Services' Penrith and Carlisle depots transferring to Cumberland. Around this time, Cumberland began a process of rebranding to CMS Cumberland, with the acquired Ribble operation in Carlisle using the brand name CMS Carlislebus.

In July 1987, Cumberland was purchased from the National Bus Company by Stagecoach Holdings, being Stagecoach's third acquisition of a former NBC subsidiary. Shortly after the purchase, the CMS Carlislebus operation began employing AEC Routemasters acquired second-hand on competitive bus corridors in and around Carlisle. CMS Cumberland's fleet livery was retained by Stagecoach until 1988, when the group's 'stripes' livery scheme began to be applied across the fleet.

Between 1987 and 1989, Cumberland purchased many of its previous competitors based across the county, taking on operators such as Yeowart's, Kirkpatricks of Brigham, the bus services of Brownriggs of Egremont. Stephensons of Maryport and Alan Palmer of Carlisle. Cumberland caused controversy during summer 1988 when a six-week 'blockade' of 20 redundant buses parked or towed around Keswick town centre, preventing tourist coaches from parking in the town, pressured Keswick Town Council to redevelop the loss-making Keswick bus station into a shopping and health centre with Stagecoach's preferred developer.

During 1989, Cumberland gained the remainder of the Cumbrian operations of Ribble Motor Services, by then also a Stagecoach subsidiary, through the transfer of Ribble's Kendal, Barrow-in-Furness and Ulverston depots, giving Cumberland complete control of Stagecoach operations across Cumbria. In July 1990, Cumberland launched a Lake District open-top bus service, running every 20 minutes between Ambleside, Windermere and Bowness-on-Windermere using a fleet of four Bristol VRs acquired from Stagecoach Southdown.

Cumberland began experiencing financial difficulties during the early 1990s, resulting in wages being cut, older Leyland Nationals being replaced by Alexander bodied Mercedes-Benz 811D minibuses, and the last of the Carlislebus Routemasters being withdrawn and replaced by Alexander PS type bodied Volvo B10M single-deck buses by the end of 1992. Operations were consolidated into a single depot in Workington that April, and when the Stagecoach Group underwent a rebrand in November 2000, these operations were integrated into the Stagecoach North West subdivision as Stagecoach in Cumbria, with a separate engineering director role retained for the region.

== Fleet ==
As of the July 1987 purchase by Stagecoach Holdings, Cumberland Motor Services operated a fleet of 230 buses based at seven depots in north and west Cumbria.

Cumberland Motor Services was the first bus operator to take delivery of the Leyland National integral single-deck bus in March 1972. The National was a pre-production example manufactured locally at British Leyland's Workington bus factory and soon became the standard full-size single-deck bus of the National Bus Company.

Under Stagecoach ownership, Cumberland took delivery of two of the three 96-seat Alexander bodied Leyland Olympian tri-axle 'Megadekka' buses ordered by the group in 1990, which were used primarily on school services.
