= North Western Road Car Company (1923) =

Bus and coach operator in North West England

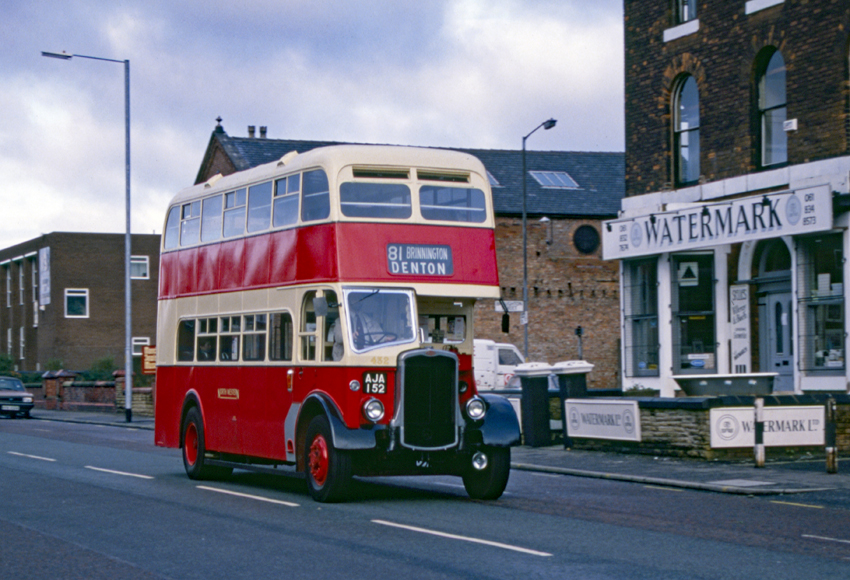
- Preserved Willowbrook bodied Bristol K5G in Manchester in October 1992
- Parent: National Bus Company
- Founded: April 1923; 102 years ago
- Ceased operation: 6 February 1974; 52 years ago
- Headquarters: Stockport, Cheshire, England
- Service area: Cheshire; Derbyshire; Lancashire; Staffordshire; West Riding of Yorkshire
- Service type: Bus and coach
- Depots: 13

The North Western Road Car Company was a bus company based in Stockport, England that operated services in Cheshire, Derbyshire, Lancashire, Staffordshire and West Riding of Yorkshire from 1923 until 1974.

== History ==
The North Western Road Car Company was formed in April 1923 from the amalgamation bus services in Buxton, Macclesfield and Stockport operated by the British Automobile Traction Company, which was owned by British Electric Traction (BET). The company, initially headquartered in Macclesfield before later moving to Stockport, operated bus services in Cheshire, Derbyshire, Lancashire, Staffordshire and West Riding of Yorkshire through a combination of growth and the acquisition of other bus companies, such as the takeover in 1924 of the Mid-Cheshire Motor Bus Company Limited, which brought new operations in Northwich and Flixton.

North Western expanded into Manchester in March 1928 following an agreement with the Manchester Corporation to launch four long-distance services from the city to parts of Derbyshire and Cheshire, followed by the launch of various co-ordinated regional services within the city the following April. North Western also operated express coach services to London, North Wales and Yorkshire. Under the terms of the Railways (Road Transport) Act 1928, allowing for the Big Four British railway companies to provide bus services, shares in North Western were acquired by the London, Midland and Scottish Railway and London North Eastern Railway.

After the ceasing of an alliance between the BET and the Tilling Group during the 1940s, which saw both companies holding a 50% share in North Western, the company changed hands back to British Electric Traction. The BET sold its UK bus interests to the Transport Holding Company in March 1967, which in turn became the National Bus Company (NBC) the following year.

The NBC eventually split North Western between its neighbouring companies; on 4 March 1972, its head office and depots in Stockport, Oldham, Glossop, Altrincham and Urmston areas were transferred to the SELNEC passenger transport executive, who formed a new company named SELNEC Cheshire to run the former North Western services. The remaining depots and services in Cheshire were transferred to fellow NBC subsidiary Crosville Motor Services that same day, however the services originating from Warrington - direct service 37 to Altrincham via Lymm Church, the indirect service 38 via Dunham Massey, and service 42 to Urmston - were jointly licensed with Warrington Corporation, while the depots in Buxton, Castleton and Matlock were transferred to Trent Motor Traction.

North Western kept hold its Manchester depot and an office at Lower Mosley Street bus station for its remaining express coach services. However, amid an NBC-wide segregation of leisure coaching from bus operations, on 6 February 1974, North Western was merged with Ribble Motor Services coaching subsidiary W.C. Standerwick and renamed National Travel (North West) Limited.

== Depots ==
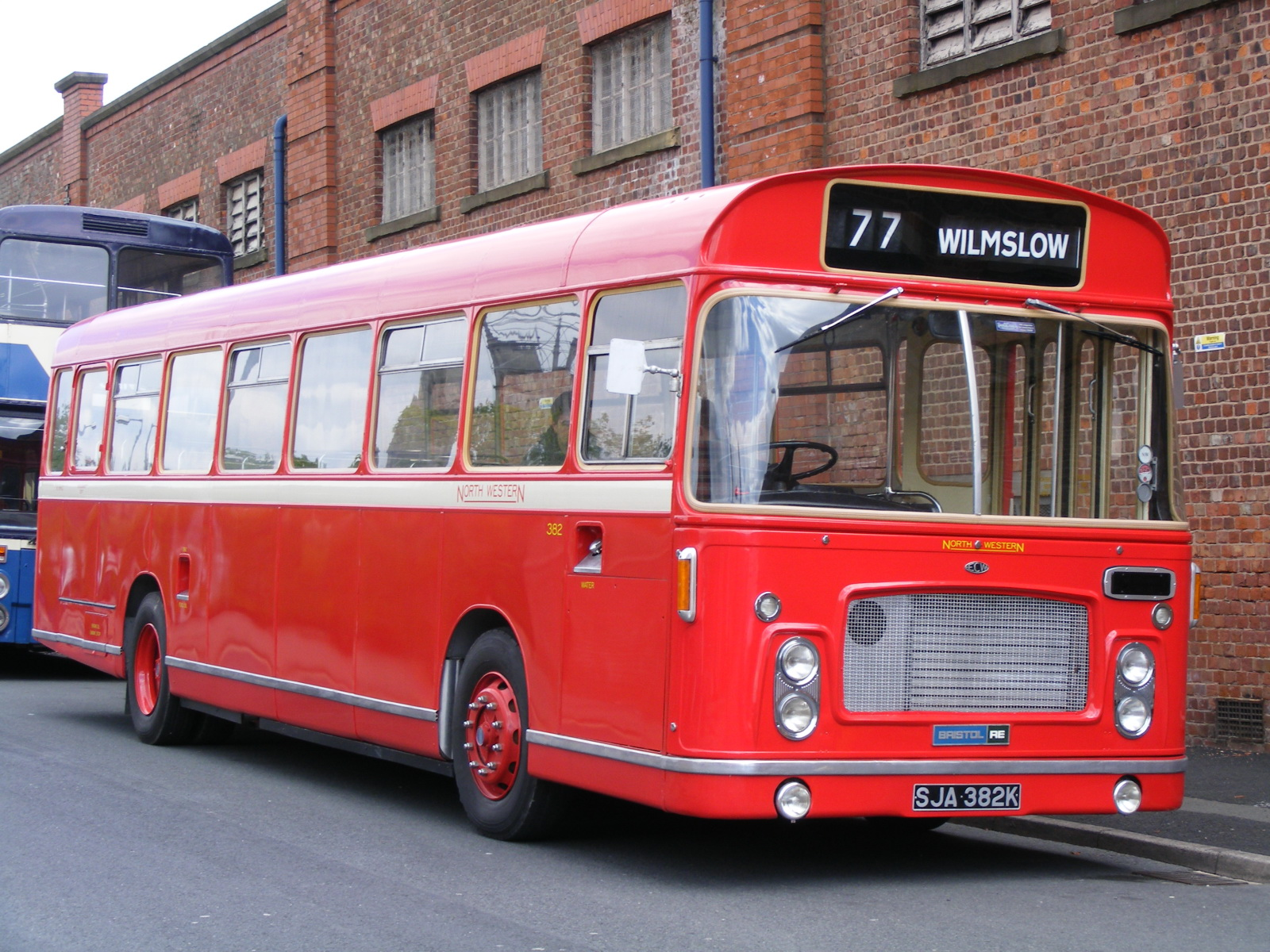
Preserved ECW bodied Bristol RELL at the Museum of Transport, Greater Manchester in May 2008

North Western had garages in:

- Altrincham: Oakfield Street
- Biddulph: Whalley Street
- Buxton: Bridge Street
- Castleton, Back Street
- Glossop: York Street
- Macclesfield: Sunderland Street
- Manchester: Hulme Hall Road
- Matlock: Bakewell Road
- Northwich: Chester Way
- Oldham: Clegg Street
- Stockport: Charles Street
- Urmston: Higher Road
- Wilmslow: Church Street

== See also ==
- List of bus operators of the United Kingdom
