= Open top buses in Weston-super-Mare =

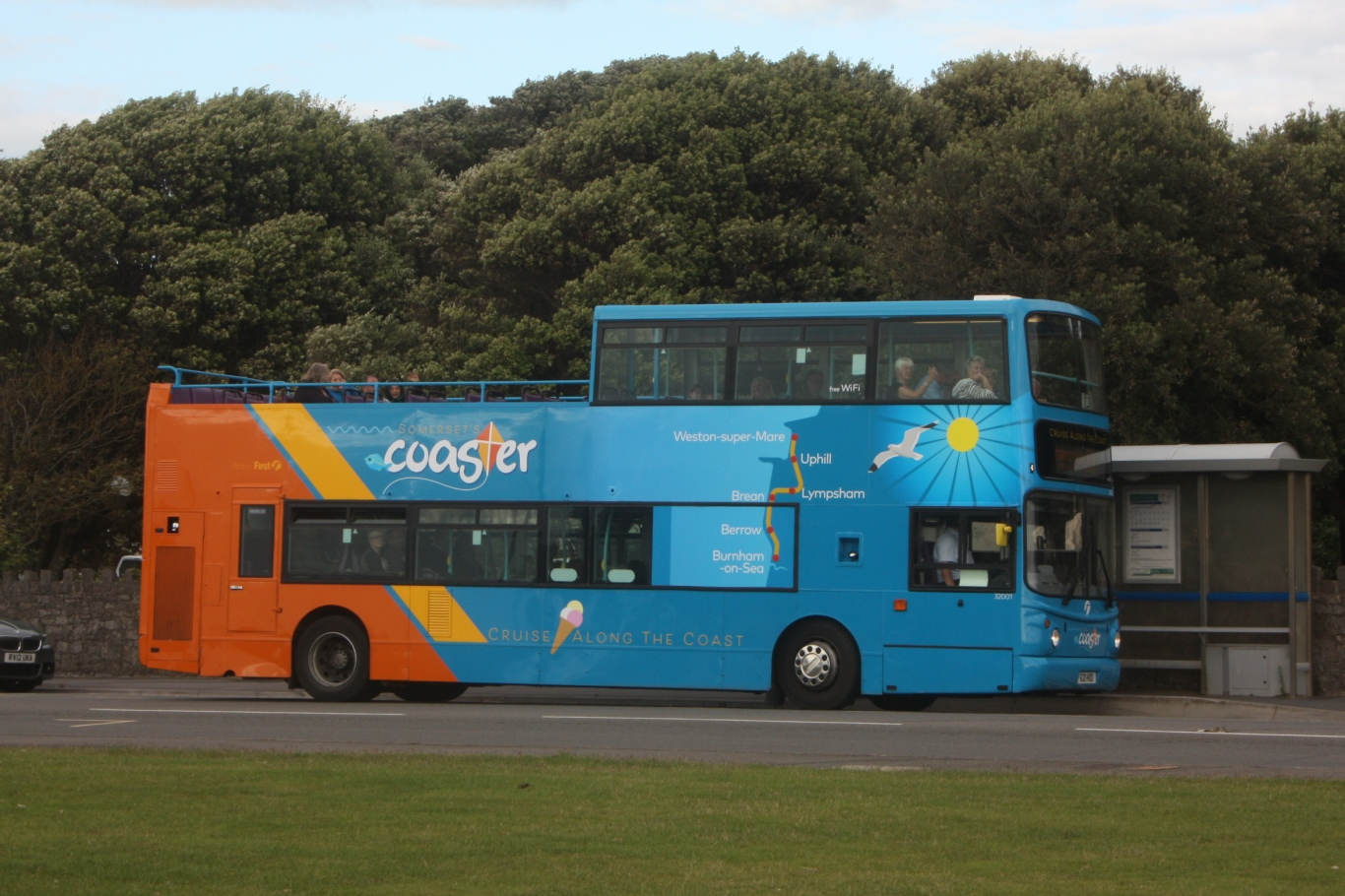
First West of England Alexander ALX400 bodied Volvo B7TL on route 20 at Ellenborough Park in August 2017

Open top buses in Weston-super-Mare, Somerset, England, were introduced in 1950 and have run along the sea front most summers since. The initial operator was Bristol Tramways and this company's successors continued to provide services until 2013. The route from Weston-super-Mare railway station to Sand Bay is operated by First West of England. From time-to-time open top buses have also provided scenic tours in and around the town.

== Current routes ==
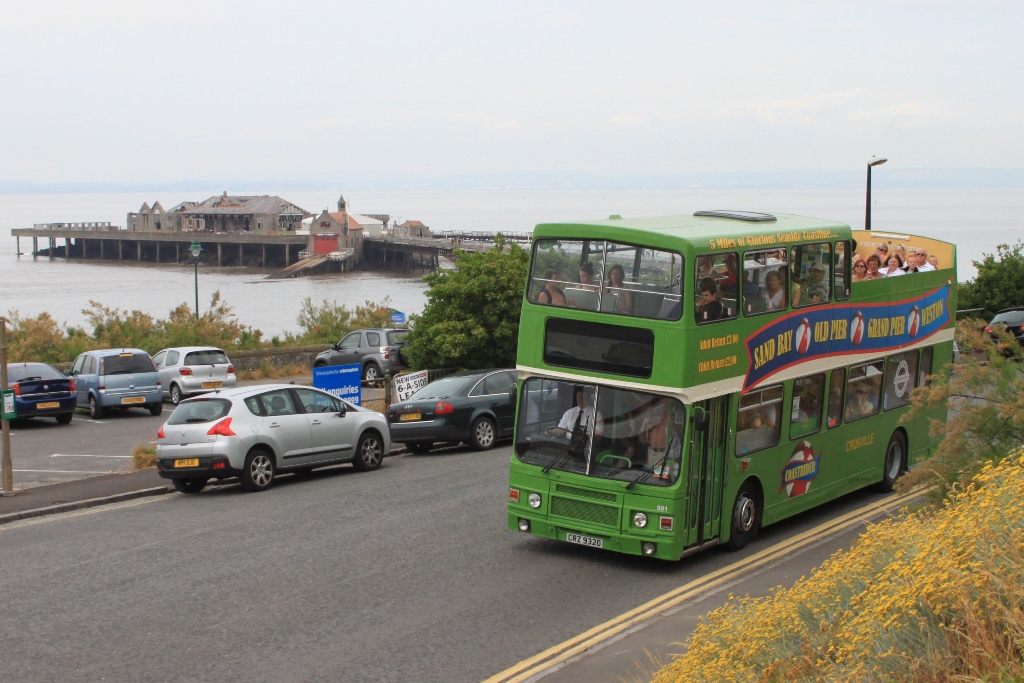
Crosville Motor Services Leyland Olympian open top bus passing Birnbeck Pier in July 2013

Route 1 runs from the town centre of Weston-super-Mare to the sea front. Here it turns northwards and runs alongside the promenade past the Grand Pier to Birnbeck Pier. It then follows a cliff-top road along the lower slopes of Worlebury Hill through Weston Woods to Kewstoke village. It then runs along the sea front of Sand Bay to the terminus. It serves Weston-super-Mare Railway Station.

First West of England has operated route 1 since April 2018. This replaced Crosville Motor Services' route 100 that it operated from April 2012 until it ceased trading in April 2018. Until July 2013 First Somerset & Avon had operated route 1 along a similar route, but not serving the southern end of the sea front.

== History ==
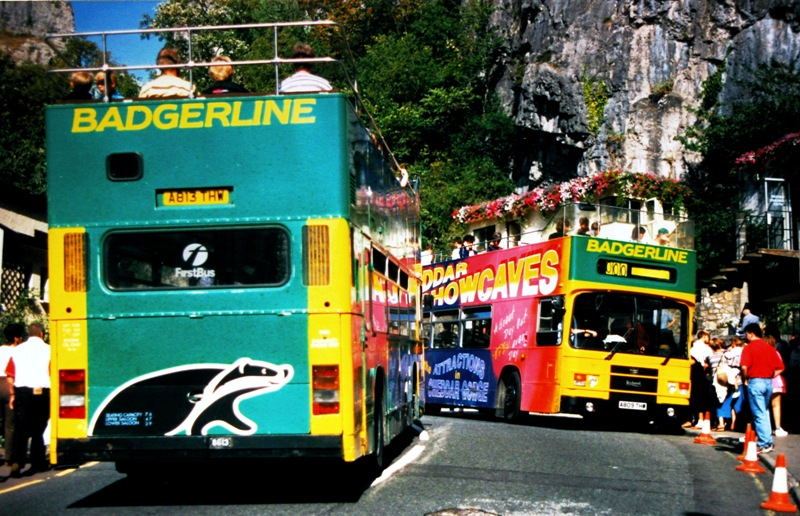
Badgerline Leyland Olympians 8613 in Badgerline livery and 8609 in Cheddar Showcaves advertising livery in 1995

On 13 May 1902, the Weston-super-Mare Tramways opened a tramway along the sea front from the Sanatorium at the south end of the Beach Lawns (today the site of Royal Sands) to the Old Pier, using a mixture of double-deck open top tram cars and open-sided "toast rack" single-deck cars. The Bristol Tramways and Carriage Company started to operate buses in the town in 1910 and opened a garage on the sea front (on the site of today's Carlton Mansion) in 1928. It started a seasonal bus service between the Sanatorium and Old Pier on 19 May 1934 which deprived the tramway of much of its profits and, three years later, it paid the Weston company to stop operating, which it did on 17 April 1937.

Buses continued to operate sea front services. These used conventional vehicles with roofs, although by this time some seaside resorts were operating similar services with open top buses. It was 1950 before open top buses appeared on service 152 (as it was known) between the Sanatorium and Old Pier. Three old vehicles of a type not usually found in the fleet had their roofs cut off and were painted cream and green. They proved popular with passengers but were replaced after a year or two-year with more conventional Bristol buses which had their roofs removed.

The Bristol Tramways and Carriage Company was renamed the Bristol Omnibus Company in 1957, 16 years after it had last operated any trams. Their old converted vehicles were replaced by new purpose-built buses in 1961, by which time some buses ran beyond the Sanatorium to Uphill. These "convertible" buses had removable roofs that could be replaced in the winter to allow them to operate ordinary services. Although these buses carried the name "Bristol" on their sides, this was replaced a couple of years later with the coat of arms of Weston-super-Mare. In 1966, when all the company's routes were renumbered, the sea front service became number 103.

A scenic tour started operating in 1972. This started from the bus station, ran along the sea front to the Old Pier, and then through Weston Woods to Sand Bay. It then came around the eastern end of Worlebury Hill to reach Upper Bristol Road and South Road, then back to the bus station. This became Tour A when a second, Tour B, was started the following year, offering a similar trip around the Mendip Hills on the south side of the town. Tour C, which combined the two tours, was run in 1980 but this was the last year that Bristol Omnibus offered open top tours in Weston. These tours required more buses so two second-hand convertibles were acquired in 1973, and a vintage open top arrived for the following season. A further open-top vehicle, converted from an accident-damaged bus, arrived in 1976.

The widespread application of National Bus Company liveries from 1972 had little effect on the open top fleet although the shades used now were slightly different, but in 1976 the whole fleet except the vintage bus were turned out in varied colours that represented the defunct tramway systems in different towns where Bristol Omnibus operated. Each bus also had a picture representing that town painted on them and received Western names.

Bus	Name	Colour	Picture	Representing
7900	Western Challenger	Dark blue	Concorde	Bristol
8576	Western Pioneer	Brown	Gloster Gladiator	Gloucester
8577	Western Conqueror	Dark red	City of Truro	Swindon
8578	Western Grandeur	Light blue	Royal Crescent	Bath
8579	Western Superior	Dark blue	Clifton Suspension Bridge	Bristol
8580	Western Splendour	Poppy red	Grand Pier	Weston-super-Mare
8581	Western Winner	Dark red	Gold Cup	Cheltenham

From 1979 the sea front route was extended to run beyond the Old Pier to Sand Bay as route 100, the whole route now being from Uphill to Sand Bay. Driver-operated buses that did not require conductors were introduced in 1980, at first with a variety of second-hand vehicles. This saw the reintroduction of a cream and green livery and a "Coastrider" brand name was soon added. This brand was retained in 1982 when a new cream livery appeared with a pale blue skirt along the bottom of the sides. The word "coast" was in large pale blue letters beneath the lower deck windows with "rider" in cream immediately beneath on the skirt.

1984 saw a new white and dark blue livery and the buses again carried names with appropriate pictures. Six new convertible buses were delivered in this livery but a few older buses were retained and repainted in the new livery.

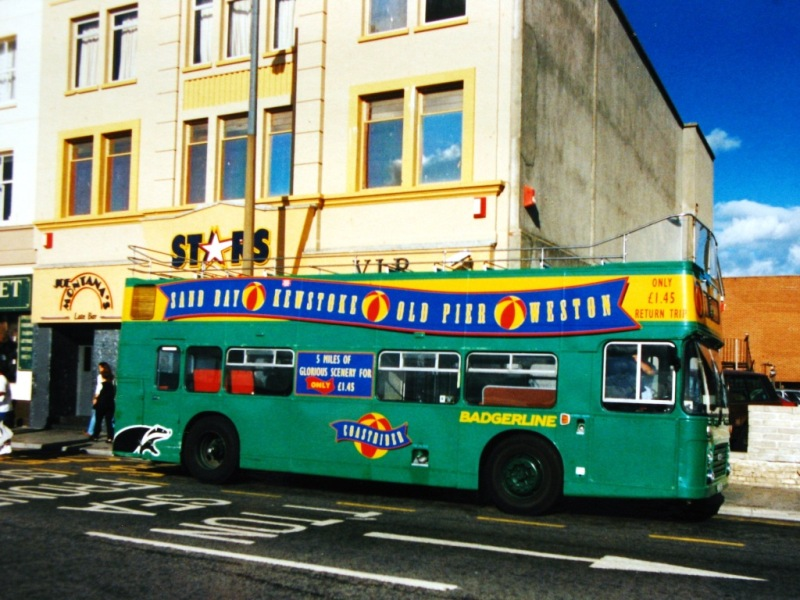
Badgerline Bristol VRT 8622 in green livery with Coastrider branding in 1994

Bus	Name
8602	Neptune's Chariot
8604	Moby Dick
8609	Sea Witch
8610	Viking
8611	The Jolly Pirate
8612	Mermaid
8613	Sea Serpent
8614	The Flying Dutchman
8618	Dolphin
8619	Octopussy

Bus operations around Weston-super-Mare were divested to the new Badgerline company in 1986. The Coastrider buses received a blue and yellow version of the Badgerline livery but this was later replaced by a green and yellow livery which matched the main fleet of buses. A plain green livery reappeared for a while and the Coastrider brand reinstated, but FirstGroup livery of grey with blue and pink relief is now used. Buses have also appeared from time to time in special advertising liveries for local attractions.

In the summer of 2000 Rexquote operated a scenic tour with heritage open top vehicles from the Sea Front. This ran through Weston Woods to Sand Bay and then ran north of Worlebury Hill to Worle and Banwell before returning to the railway station and sea front.

== Beyond Weston-super-Mare ==
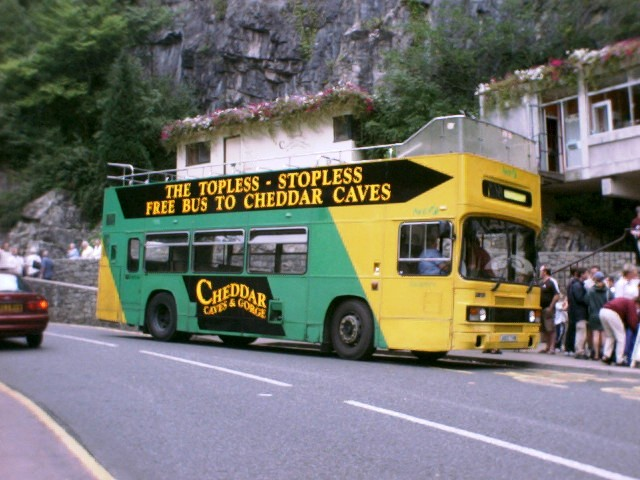
Leyland Olympian 8612 on a 'Topless-Stopless' working at Cheddar in 2000

A service 137 operated between Burnham-on-Sea and Brean Down from 1977, which entailed occasional open top buses running from Weston-super-Mare to Burnham-on-Sea. It was renumbered as route 146 in 1981 and from 1983 it was combined with the Weston-super-Mare service to run through from Burnham to Sand Bay as service 151. From 2017 until 2020 First West of England operated some services on route 20 from Weston-super-Mare to Burnham-on-Sea with open top buses branded "Somerset's Coaster".

Other scheduled First Somerset & Avon services outside Weston have included various routes around Cheddar including Park and Ride services and a "Topless-Stopless" service from the holiday camps at Brean to Cheddar Gorge. The open top bus service in Cheddar Gorge continued for many years but provided by Longleat Enterprises in conjunction with their caves and attractions. It has now ceased.

Special services have often seen the buses carrying victorious sports stars such as Robin Cousins in Bristol, and the England cricket team around London following victory in the 2005 Ashes series. Other uses have been as grandstands at The Derby or for charity collections in local carnivals and at Christmas.

== Vehicles ==
=== Crew operated ===
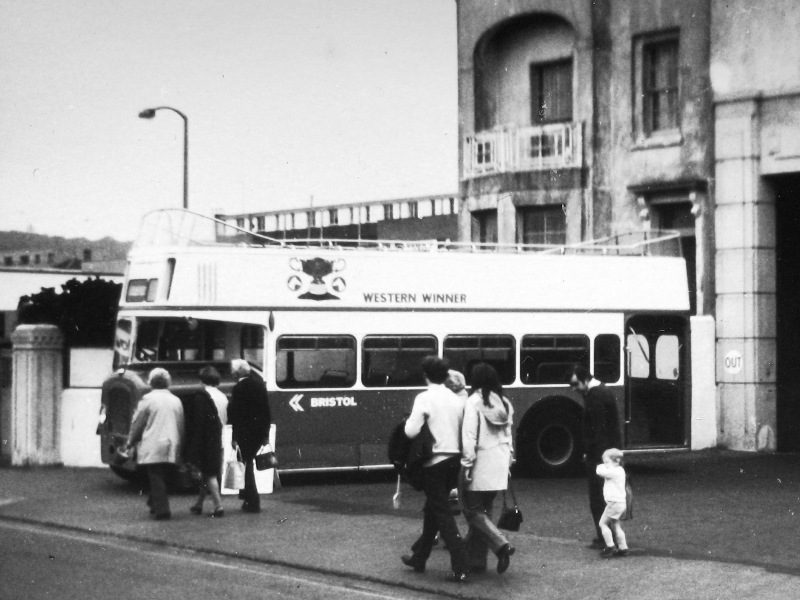
Bristol LD 8581 Western Winner circa 1980

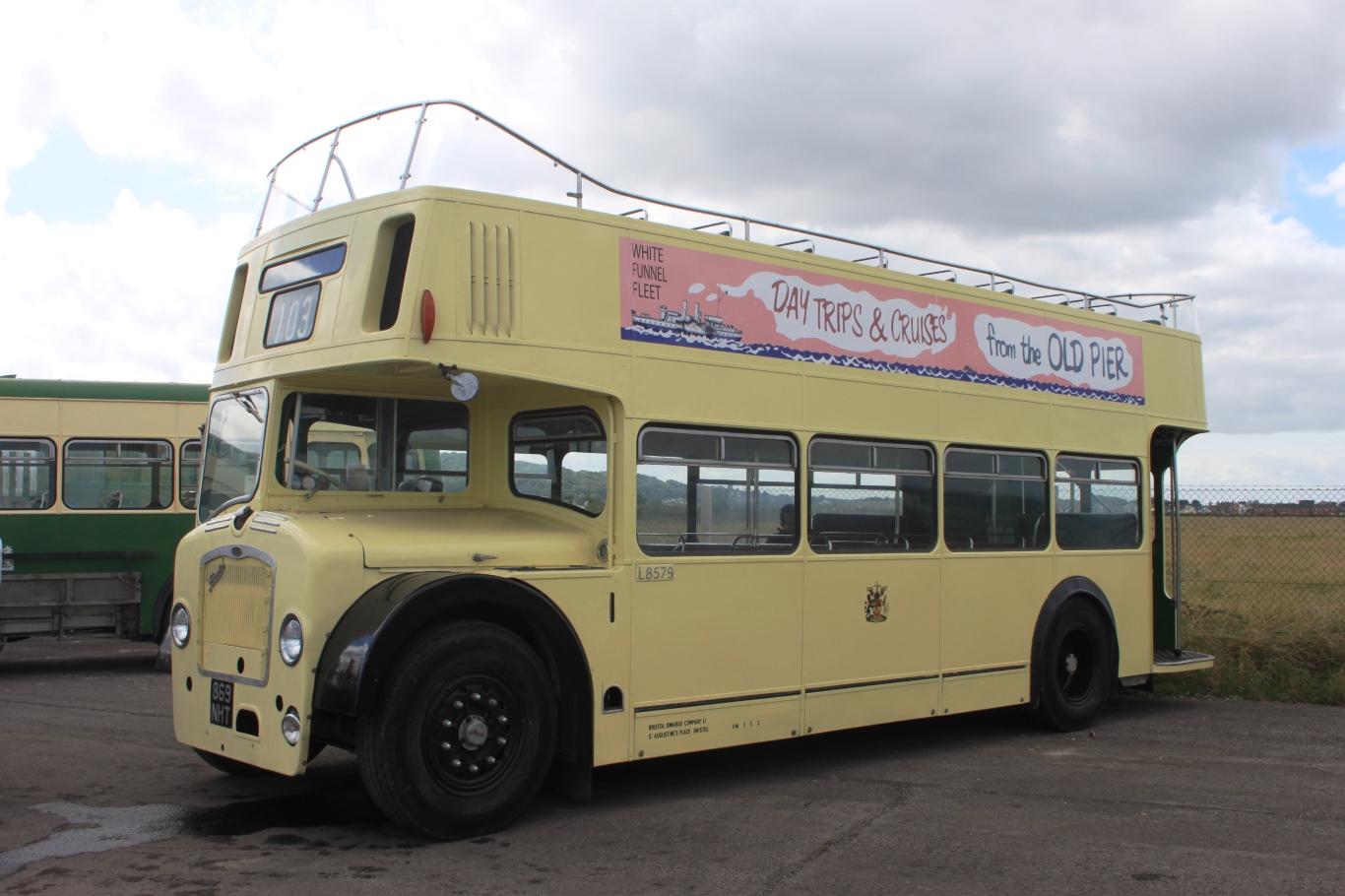
Preserved Bristol FS 8576 visiting the town in 2016

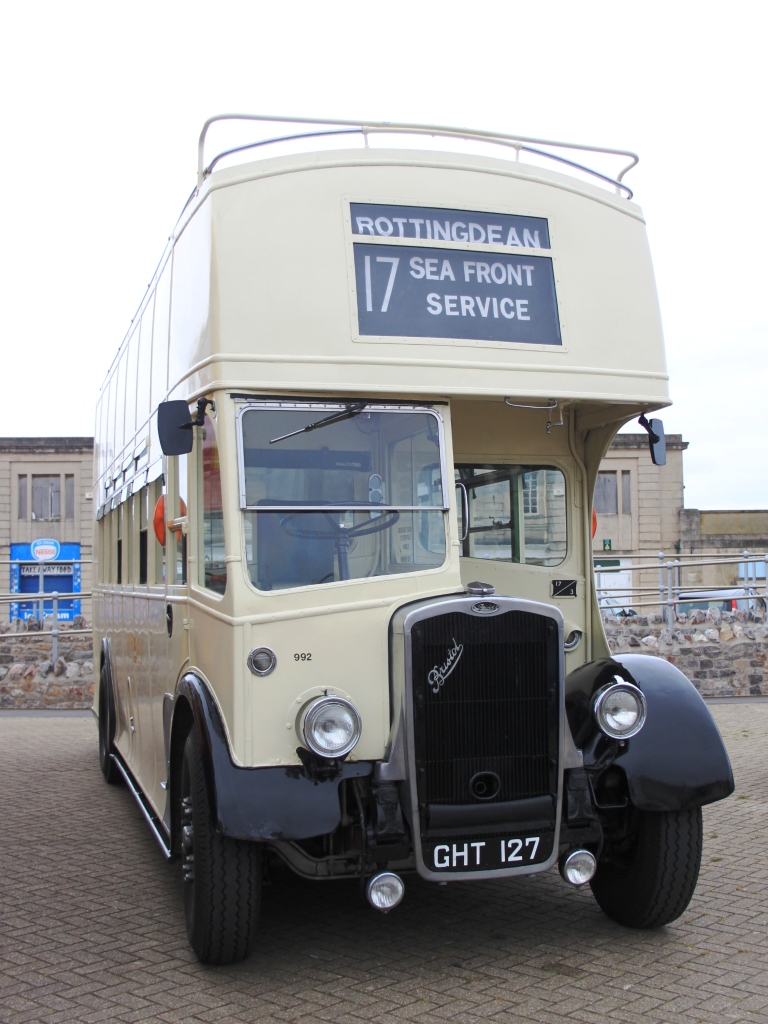
Bristol K 8583 restored as Brighton & Hove 927 at Weston-super-Mare in 2012

The first three buses were converted in 1950 at the company's workshops in Bristol using old buses acquired that year with the takeover of Cheltenham District Traction. They had AEC Regent III chassis with Weymann bodywork. Following the success of the first year's operation, four buses that were more in keeping with the rest of the local fleet were converted. These had Bristol K chassis with 5-cylinder Gardner engines and Bristol bodies.

The first buses built new as open top vehicles arrived in 1961. They were built on Bristol Lodekka chassis with 60-seat ECW convertible bodies – that is with detachable roofs so that they could operate as conventional buses during the winter. Most Lodekkas in the fleet were the FLF type, but these were the shorter FS model fitted with 6-cylinder Gardner engines. Two more convertible Lodekkas were purchased secondhand from Crosville Motor Services company. These were the LD model fitted with 6-cylinder Bristol engines, two years older than the FSs. They had 60-seat ECW bodies with a conductor-operated door, which made then a more attractive proposition for winter services than the FSs with their open platform. A final Lodekka joined the fleet in 1976, this time an FLF. Its 70-seat body had its roof removed following a collision with a low bridge in Bristol. Like the LDs, it was fitted with a 6-cylinder Bristol engine but had a power-operated door at the front instead of the rear entrances on the earlier buses.

A 'new' Bristol K5G appeared in 1974. It was fitted with a 59-seat Eastern Coach Works (ECW) body and had been built in 1941 for the Bristol Tramways fleet. In 1954 it had been sold to Brighton & Hove where it was converted to an open top. In 1965 it was sold to Thomas Brothers in Port Talbot and named "The Sandfields Belle". In 1969 it was sold back to Bristol Omnibus and was put in store until returned to service at Weston-super-Mare in 1974. It operated alongside the Lodekkas in cream livery that year and again in 1978 and 1979. It also appeared on television, including an episode of the Shoestring detective series, when some criminals met on the top deck as it drove along the Sea Front. In 1979 it was placed in the hands of a preservation group but returned to Bristol Omnibus and then on to Badgerline who put it to work on the city tour in Bath for several years where it carried the name "Prince Bladud". It has now returned to preservation.

When Rexquote operated their vintage open top tour in 2000 they used Bristol Lodekkas, this time the LDL model (a longer version of the LD) with a Gardner engine and 70-seat ECW body. They had been built in 1957 and converted to open top by Western National for services in Cornwall. They wore a cream and green livery and retained the Sea Dog names bestowed by Western National.

Fleet	Registration	Chassis	At Weston	Comments
3610	DG 9822	AEC Regent III	1950–1951	
3611	BAD 27	AEC Regent III	1950–1952	
3612	BAD 28	AEC Regent III	1950–1952	
3613	FHT 263	Bristol K5G	1951–1961	
3614	GL 6612	Bristol K5G	1952–1961	
3615	GL 6614	Bristol K5G	1953?–1961	
3616	GL 6611	Bristol K5G	1953–1961	
7900	841 SHW	Bristol FLF6B	1976–1982	Owned by Chepstow Classic Buses
8576	866 NHT	Bristol FS6G	1961–1980	Preserved in original closed top form, re-registered 452 XVE in 2019
8577	867 NHT	Bristol FS6G	1961–1980	Exported to Germany in 1982, derelict by 2017
8578	868 NHT	Bristol FS6G	1961–1981	Destroyed by fire in 2019
8579	869 NHT	Bristol FS6G	1961–1979	Preserved
8580	626 HFM	Bristol LD6B	1973–1979?	Last reported for sale in Lydney in 2000
8581	627 HFM	Bristol LD6B	1973–1980	Owned by Cumbria Classic Coaches, Kirkby Stephen
8583	GHT 127	Bristol K5G	1974–1979	Preserved
(Rexquote)	VDV 752	Bristol LDL6BG	2000	Preserved, named Admiral Boscawen
(Rexquote)	VDV 753	Bristol LDL6BG	2000	Preserved, named Sir Humphry Davy

=== Driver operated ===
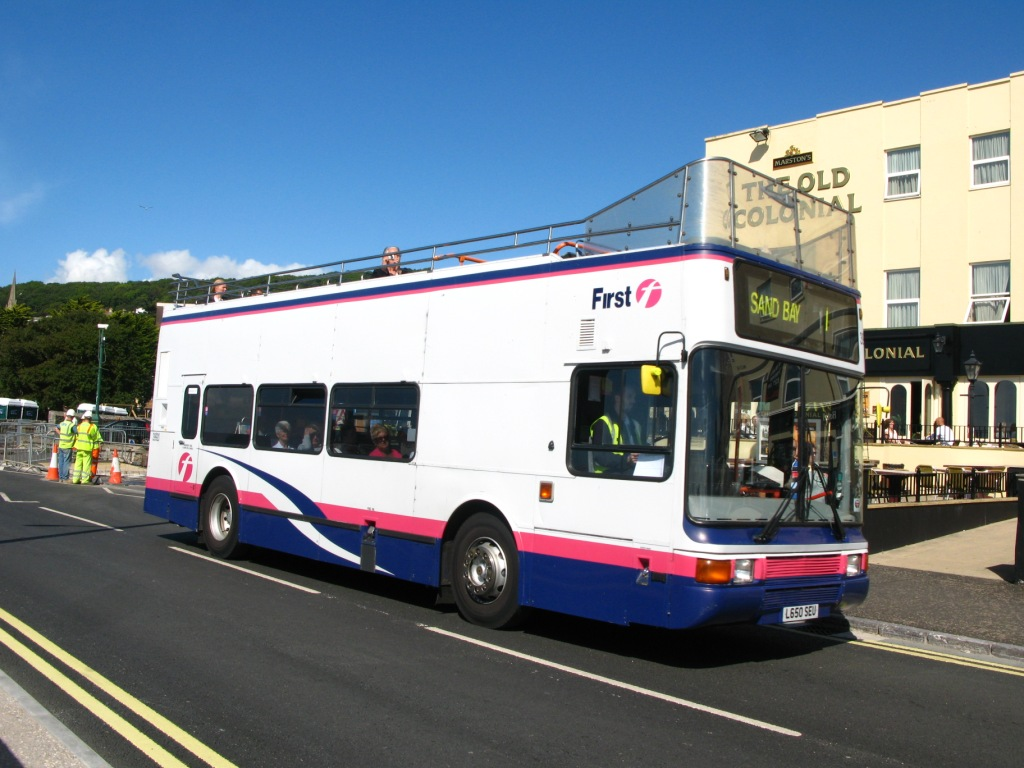
First Somerset & Avon Volvo Olympian 39920 in September 2010

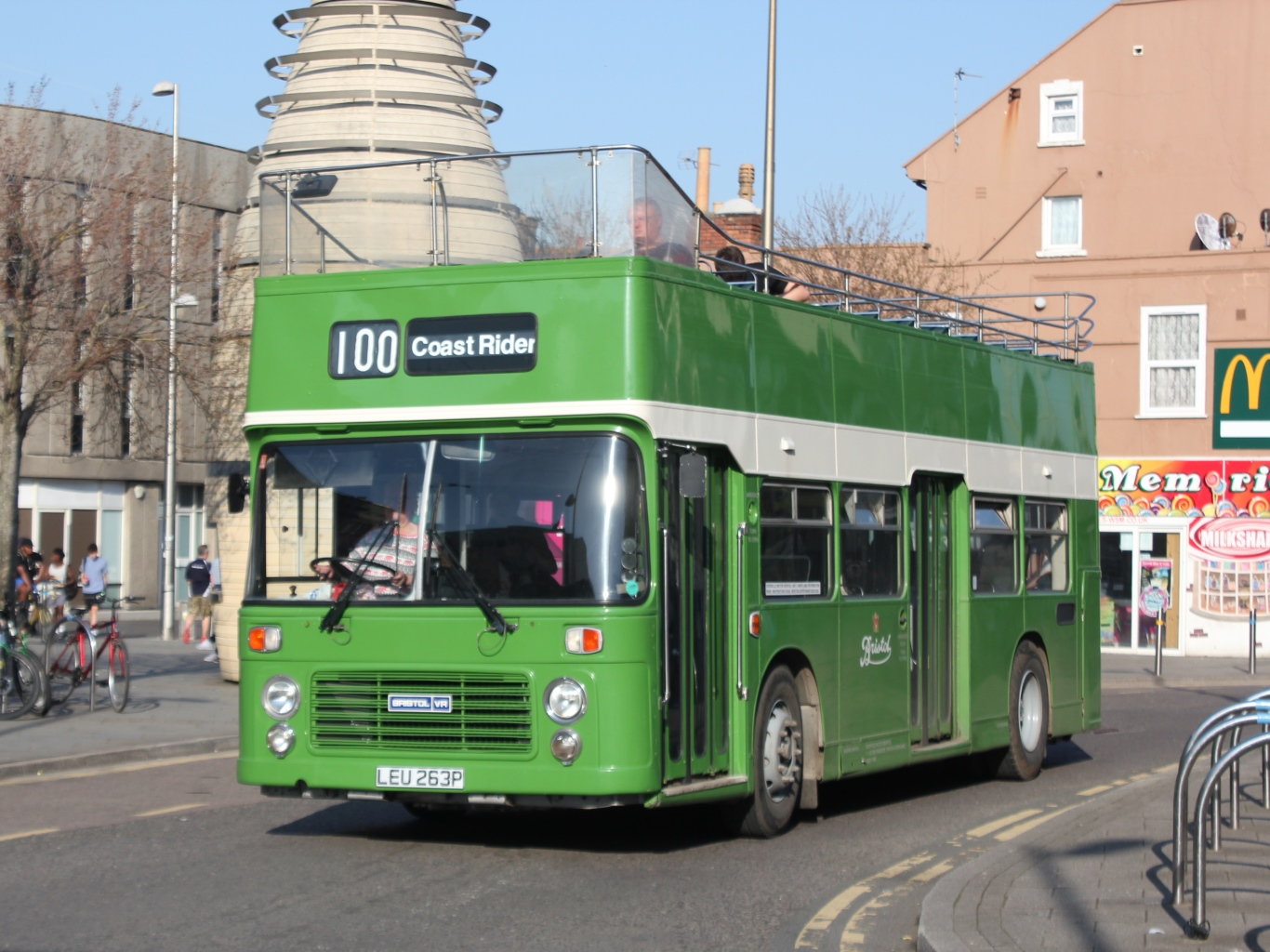
Bristol 8622 in operation with Crosville Motor Services in 2018

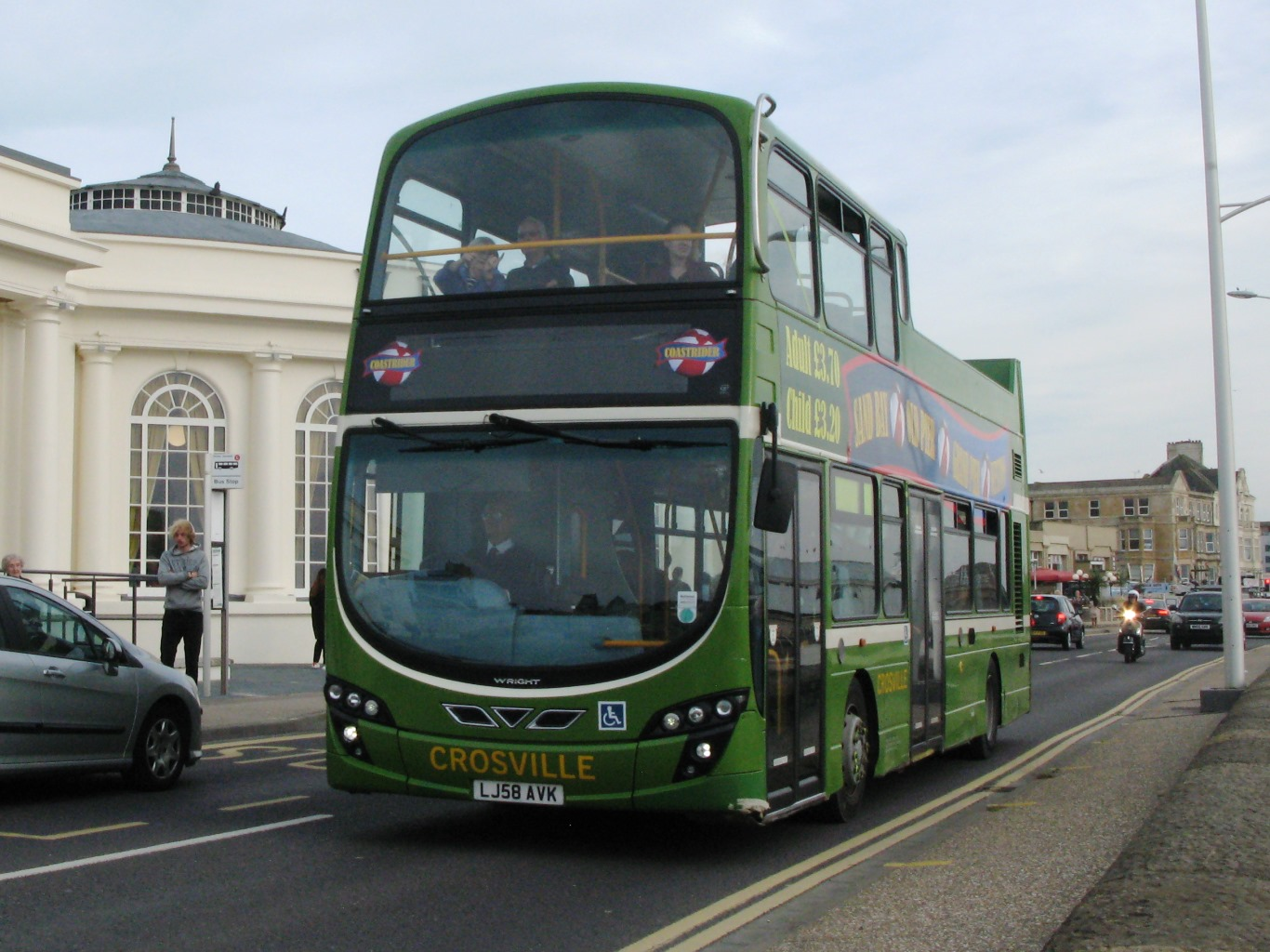
Crosville Motor Services Wright Gemini HEV 408 in September 2017

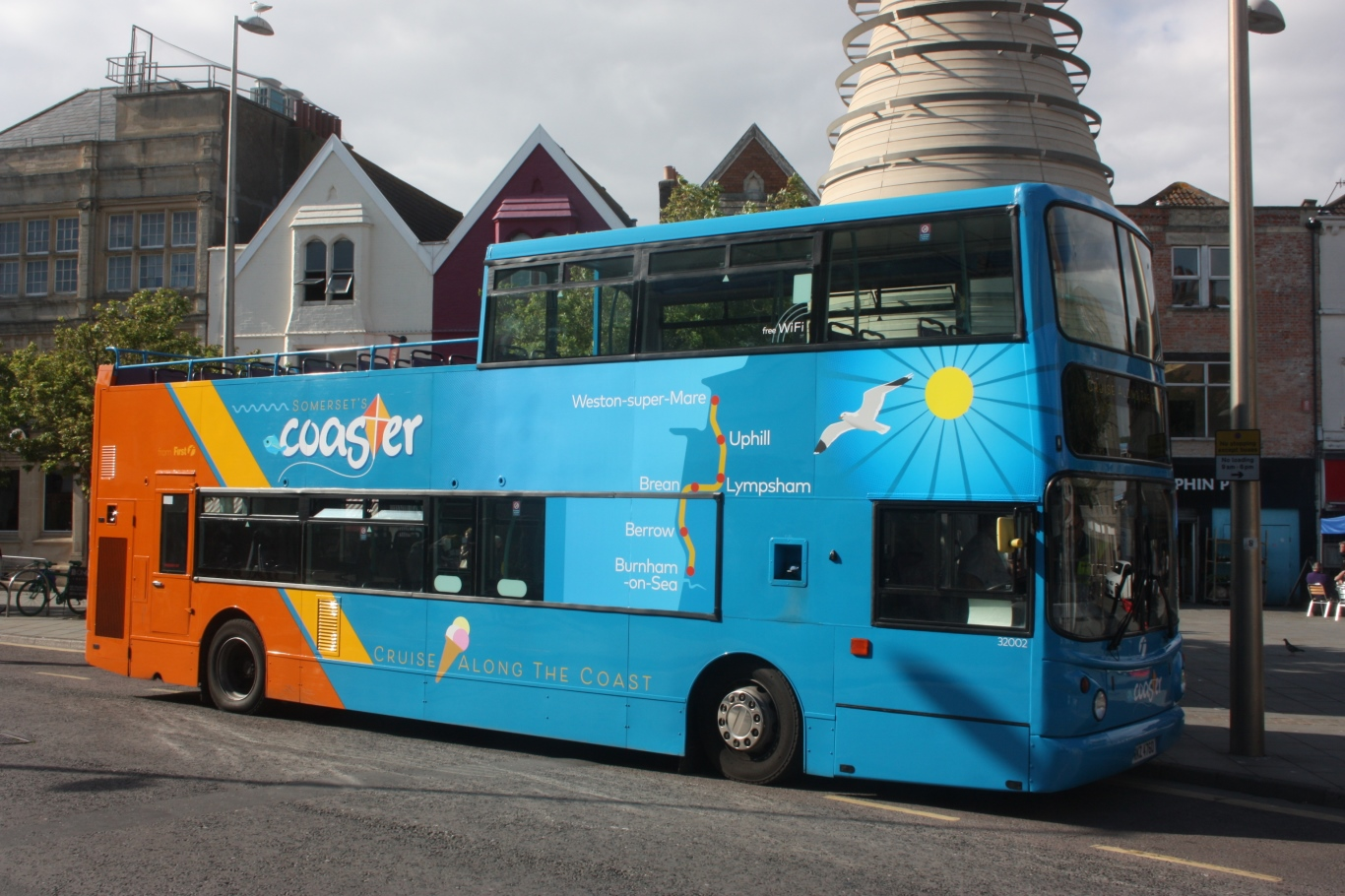
First West of England Alexander ALX400 bodied Volvo B7TL 32002 in August 2017

The first driver-only open top buses were converted from secondhand vehicles from a variety of sources. Three of them were Hants & Dorset buses of the Leyland Atlantean PDR1/2 type with low-height Charles H Roe bodies, originally delivered to the King Alfred Motor Services in Winchester. The final Atlantean was a PDR1/1 type with a 76-seat Weymann body obtained from Maidstone & District; the handle for changing the destination display was inconveniently located and so it tended to stay on one route and in later years had a permanent "open top service" destination painted on the front. At the same time as the Atlaneans were purchased, two Daimler Fleetlines with Alexander bodies were acquired from Midland Red. After they had been replaced at Weston-super-Mare they moved to Bristol to operate the city tour. The first conversion was tested in 1979 and summertime driver-only operation started the following year.

The first Bristol VRTs were two convertible buses with 74-seat ECW convertible bodies, but after just one season at Weston-super-Mare, when they operated in their old cream and green Southern Vectis livery, they were transferred to Bath to operate a new city tour. Other buses from Weston have operated the Bath tour, and buses from Bath have occasionally been pressed into service at Weston. New purpose-built Leyland Olympian buses with 76-seat Charles H Roe convertible bodies were purchased in 1984. A more modern Olympian was transferred from the Bath fleet when the operation of the city tour ceased. It was converted to open top after a low-bridge accident and has a 76-seat Northern Counties Palatine 2 body.

Bristol Omnibus	Registration	Chassis	At Weston	Comments
8600	HOR 592E	Leyland Atlantean	1979–?	Preserved (in closed top form) by the Friends of King Alfred Buses
8601	RTH 932S	Bristol VRT	1997 only	
8602	HOR 590E	Leyland Atlantean	1980–?	Preserved by the Friends of King Alfred Buses
8603	HOR 589E	Leyland Atlantean	1980–1983	
8604	612 UKM	Leyland Atlantean	1981–1992	
8605	LHA 623F	Daimler Fleetline	1980–1983	
8606	LHA 615F	Daimler Fleetline	1981–1983	
8607	UFX 859S	Bristol VRT	1983 only	
8608	UFX 860S	Bristol VRT	1983 only	Preserved (in closed top form) in Gosport
8609	A809 THW	Leyland Olympian	1984–?	
8610	A810 THW	Leyland Olympian	1984–?	Preserved in Bristol.
8611	A811 THW	Leyland Olympian	1984–?	
8612	A812 THW	Leyland Olympian	1984–2007	Later renumbered 39912, exported to America.
8613	A813 THW	Leyland Olympian	1984–2007	Later renumbered 39913, preserved in Bristol.
8614	A814 THW	Leyland Olympian	1984–?	
8617	JHW 109P	Bristol VRT	1997–2003	Used for Cheddar Gorge tour and as spare in Weston-super-Mare
8618	JHW 112P	Bristol VRT	1985–1994	
8619	JHW 114P	Bristol VRT	1985–1999	Exported to Canada in 2000
8621	LEU 269P	Bristol VRT	2004	Preserved in Bristol
8622	LEU 263P	Bristol VRT	1993–1999	Later with Crosville Motor Services.

First Group	Registration	Chassis	At Weston	Comments
32001	620 HOD	Volvo B7TL	2017-2020	
32002	RKZ 4760	Volvo B7TL	2017-2020	
32003	PSU 360	Volvo B7TL	2017-2020	
32011	W811 PAE	Volvo B7TL	2019-2021	
32012	W812 PAE	Volvo B7TL	2018-2021	
32013	W813 PAE	Volvo B7TL	2019-2021	
37629	WX58 JYR	Volvo B9TL	2022-	
37630	WX58 JYS	Volvo B9TL	2022-	
38005	D705 GHY	Volvo Citybus	2012 to 2013	
39920	L650 SEU	Volvo Olympian	2005 to 2013	Preserved in Bristol.

== See also ==
- Open top buses in the United Kingdom
- Open top buses in Torbay
