= Crosville Motor Services (Weston-super-Mare) =

Bus operator in Somerset, England

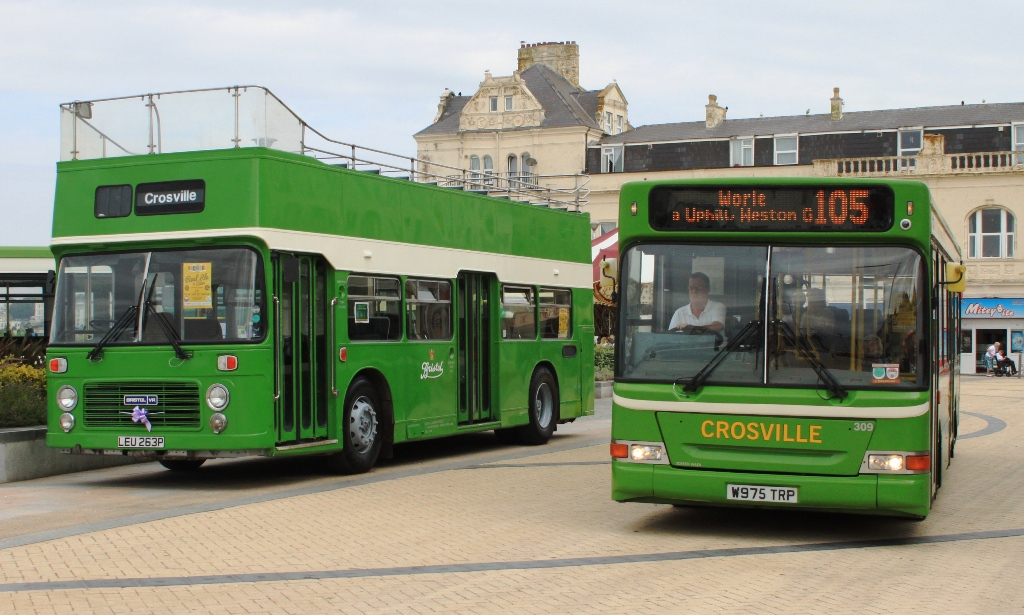
- Open top Bristol VRT and Plaxton Pointer bodied Dennis Dart in Weston-super-Mare in July 2013
- Parent: Jonathan Jones-Pratt
- Founded: 2011; 14 years ago
- Defunct: 21 April 2018; 6 years ago
- Headquarters: Weston-super-Mare
- Service area: Somerset
- Alliance: Somerset Passenger Solutions
- Depots: Formerly at Winterstoke Road, Weston-super-Mare
- Fleet: circa 30 (2013)
- Website: www.crosvillemotorservices.co.uk

Crosville Motor Services was a bus operator running both contract hire and public bus services between 2011 and 2018 from its base in Weston-super-Mare, North Somerset, England. It also operated a fleet of heritage vehicles and continues to do so as 'Crosville Vintage'.

== History ==
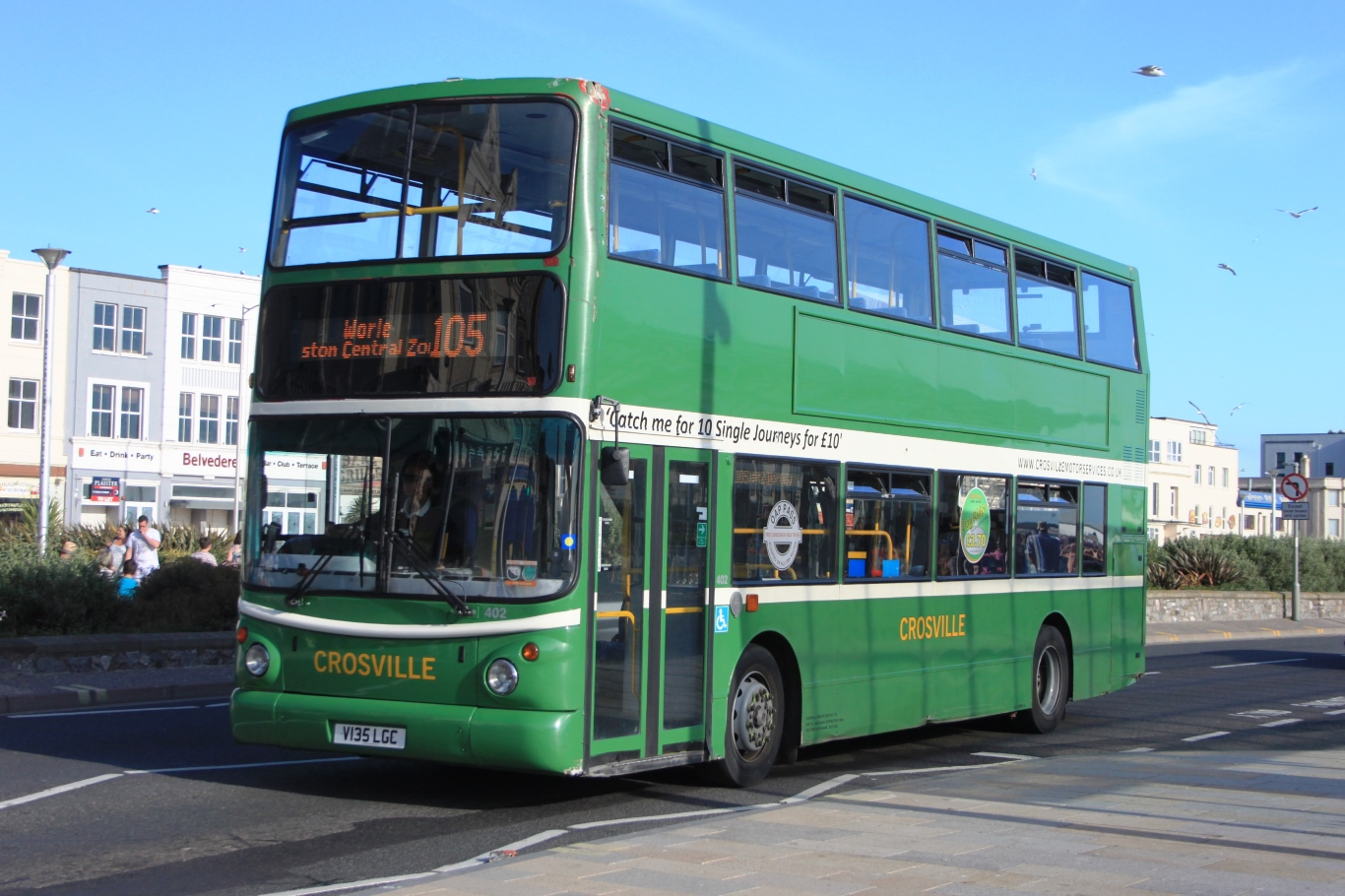
Alexander ALX400 bodied Volvo B7TL in Weston-super-Mare in August 2015

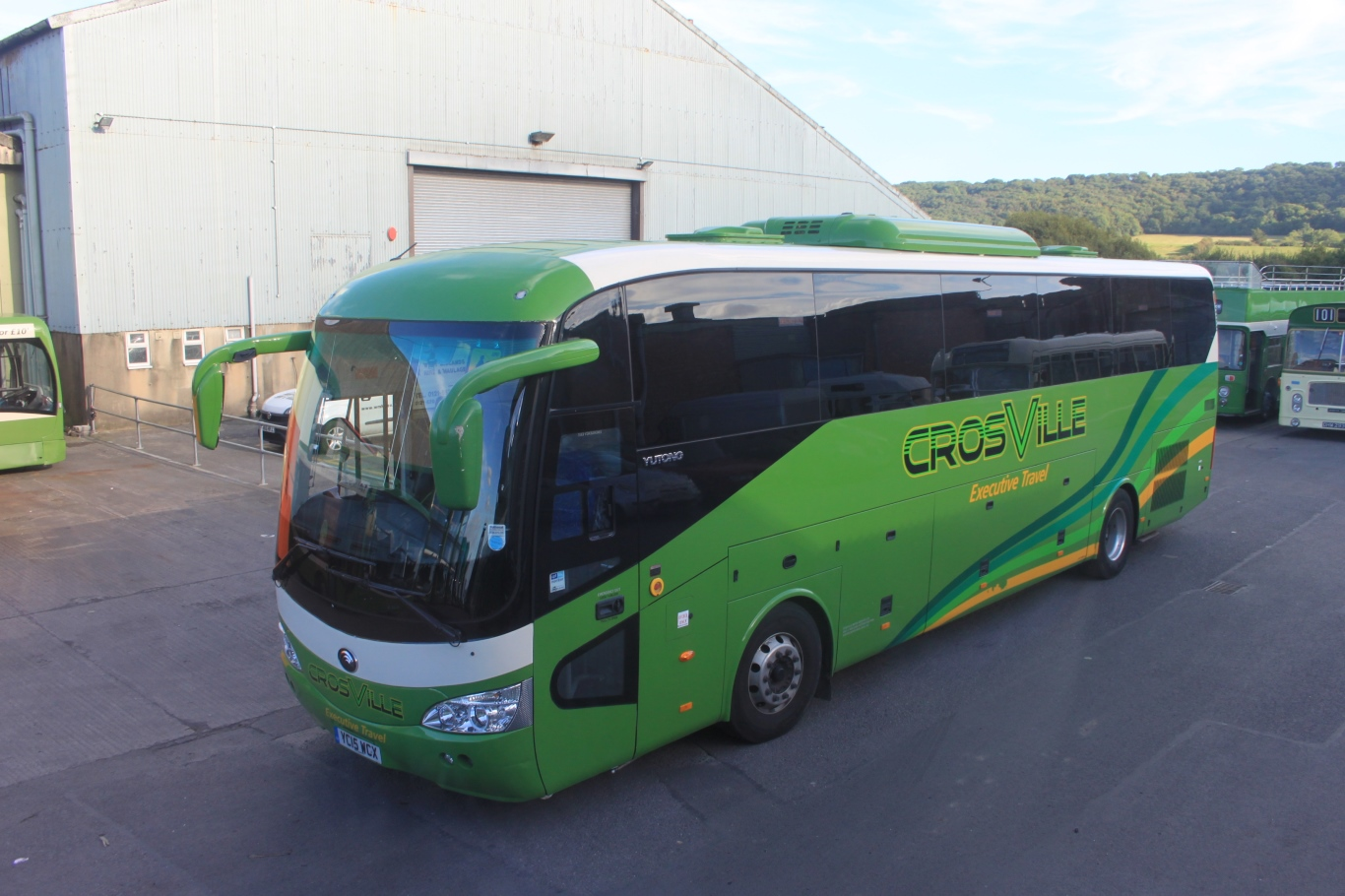
Yutong ZK6129H coach at the company's depot in September 2016

The original Crosville Motor Services was a major bus operator running services in Mid and North Wales and North West England. The name fell out of use after that company was privatised but was resurrected by this new operator. Some of the heritage fleet were once used by the original Crosville.

Although contract and private hire work had been undertaken from 2011, Crosville's first four commercial bus routes commenced operation in April 2012. These included routes from Weston-super-Mare to Sand Bay and Burnham-on-Sea, also a sea front tour to Uphill which was operated by heritage buses on summer Sundays and public holidays.

In April 2013, Crosville commenced operating a further two routes, 4 and 83.

In 2016, Crosville's proprietor commenced operating services during the construction of EDF Energy's Hinkley Point C nuclear power station through a 50% shareholding in Somerset Passenger Solutions. Although operated independently, there was some sharing of resources with Crosville.

In April 2016, Crosville commenced operating services in Bristol and South Gloucestershire under contract to North Somerset Council.

In July 2017, six routes were withdrawn and an enforced reduction in fleet size by the Traffic Commissioner following a public enquiry after some vehicles were found to be operating in unsafe condition. After this, the managing director, Jon-Jones Pratt, announced that Crosville would cease operation in Weston Super Mare in early 2018. In February 2018, the company announced that it would cease all local bus services and school operations at the conclusion of services on 21 April 2018. Following a further public enquiry by the Traffic Commissioner, Crosville's operating licence was revoked from 25 April 2018. All services on the final day were operated by vehicles from the heritage fleet.

After operations ceased, First West of England introduced a replacement service to Sand Bay, while Bristol independent Carmel Coaches took over route 106 on a temporary basis.

== Fleet ==
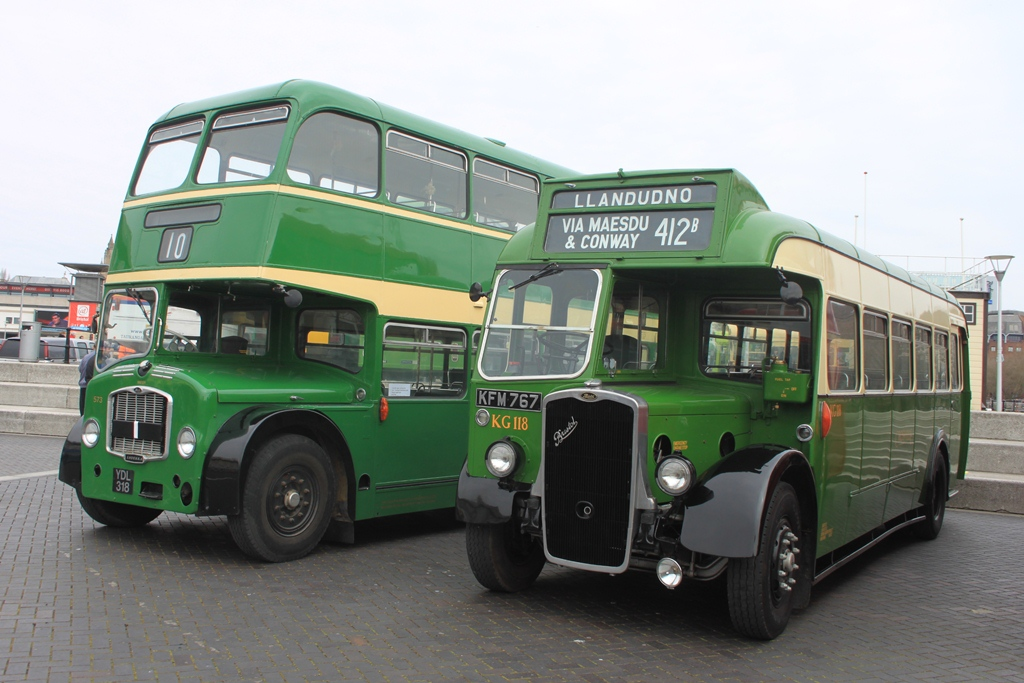
Heritage Bristol Lodekka and Bristol L5G at Bristol Harbour in April 2013

In January 2012, the Crosville fleet comprised 25 vehicles, including modern coaches and the heritage fleet. To operate its first four commercial services, the operator purchased two Dennis Dart single deck buses as well as a part-open-top Leyland Olympian from Xelabus of Eastleigh. Two Optare Solos and a Mercedes-Benz 811D minibus were also purchased from Blue Iris Coaches of Nailsea.

After operations ceased, four buses from the heritage fleet were retained in Weston-super-Mare by parent company JJP Holdings SW and promoted as the 'Crosville Vintage' fleet. Most of the other heritage vehicles were retained by the owner as a private collection. These were stored at five locations but planning permission was granted in 2020 to house them all at a single site in Uphill.
