= Swansea Improvements and Tramway Company =

Welsh street tram company

Operation
- Locale: Swansea
- Open: 12 April 1878
- Close: 29 June 1937
- Status: Closed

Infrastructure
- Track gauge: 4 ft 8 1/2 in (1,435 mm)
- Propulsion systems: Horse, steam then electric

Statistics
- Route length: 13.36 miles (21.50 km)

The Swansea Improvements and Tramway Company (SITC) operated street trams in and around Swansea in Wales from 1878 to 1937.

== Background ==
Swansea is Wales's second-largest city and was a leader in the Industrial Revolution, owing to the ready availability of local resources of coal and good access via its seaport to imported metal ores, especially copper, from the West Country, Cornwall and Devon.

The city is constrained geographically by high hills landwards from Swansea Bay giving the city a reversed 'L' shape. Transport was a particular issue for the rapidly expanding town (as it was before the investiture of the Prince of Wales in 1969 made it a city). Industry and workers' housing was expanding northwards towards Morriston, up the Swansea Valley whilst wealthier homes spread westwards along the coast towards Sketty. The world's first passenger railway, the Swansea and Mumbles Railway (SMR), had demonstrated the power of rails to carry passengers but a street tramway was not considered until after the Tramways Act 1870 (33 & 34 Vict. c. 78) when a group of business men formed the Swansea Tramways Company. Problems with raising capital and the need for street widening to accommodate trams led to its failure and the subsequent formation of the Swansea Improvements and Tramway Company (SITC) in 1873 to not only widen the streets but also provide places of entertainment including a music hall and a pier at the Mumbles.

== Horse trams ==
Horse trams to Morriston and St Helens began in 1878 and in 1882 to Cwmbwrla using 10 American built cars. The company had powers to run their trams along the SMR but were forced by a court ruling to run horse trams only behind the SMR's own steam trains to stop their trial of three Hughes Locomotive Company steam engines being used to pull their passenger cars. The three engines were moved to run the Cwmbwrla route but they proved unreliable, possibly due to the steep gradients and so led to Swansea being the first town in Wales to introduce electric traction in 1900 after being bought-out by the British Electric Traction Company Limited (BET).

== Electric tram services ==
The electric trams initially worked four services:

Single deck bogie tram No.23, Built by Brush and exhibited at the Tramway Exhibition of 1900. These trams were used mostly on the longer Morriston route

1. High Street and Morriston
2. High Street and Cwmbwrla
3. Alexandra Road and Docks
4. Gower Street and St Helens

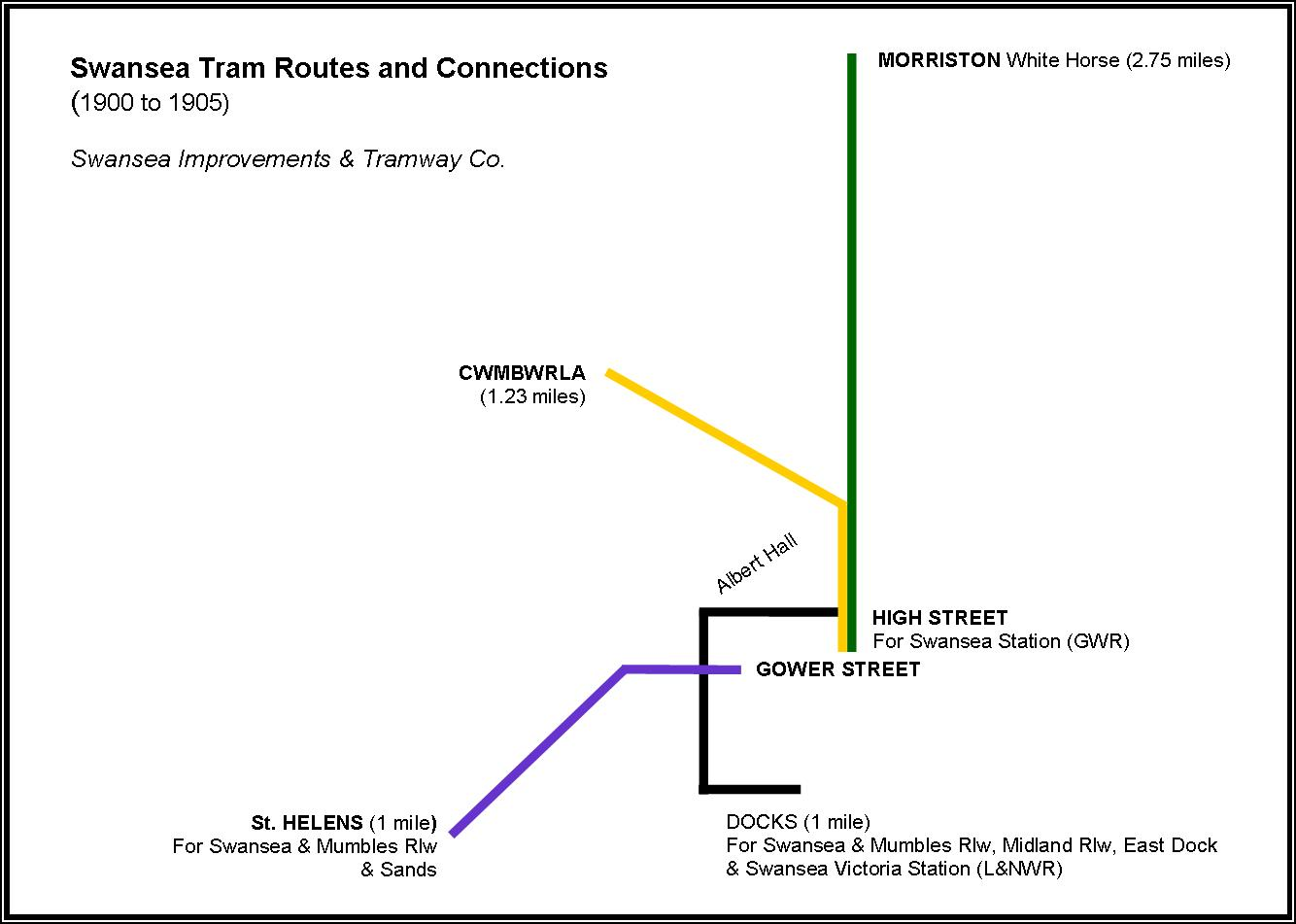
Initial Route Plan

As only the last route was free of low bridges, the initial purchase of cars was mostly single deckers: 15 4-wheelers for the shorter routes, 15 bogie cars for the Morriston route and just four open-top double deckers added later in the year exclusively for the St. Helen's route. As many of the workers using the trams were unable to read, route numbers were not used but a system of letters by day and coloured lights by night was used until 1934. Four open-top cars came from the Weston-super-Mare Tramways in 1904 where they had been damaged by a high tide.

In 1905, following a failed attempt to take over the tramway, Swansea Corporation won the right to build several new lines but had to give the running powers to the SITC. Glamorgan County Council, meanwhile, built an extension northwards from Morriston to Ynysforgan (intended to be a new system to Pontardawe but never completed) for which the SITC also provided the cars and electric power. Three further short extensions followed in 1913 promoted by the SITC to link between some of the existing tracks to permit more route variation giving the final route pattern used from then until closure in 1937.

Final service routes:

1. Castle Street and Morriston
2. Castle Street and Cwmbwrla
3. Castle Street and Brynhyfryd
4. High Street and Sketty
5. Docks and Sketty
6. Wind Street and Brynmill
7. High Street and St Helens
8. St Helens and Port Tennant
9. Market and Sketty (occasional route)
10. Albert Hall and Sketty (occasional route)

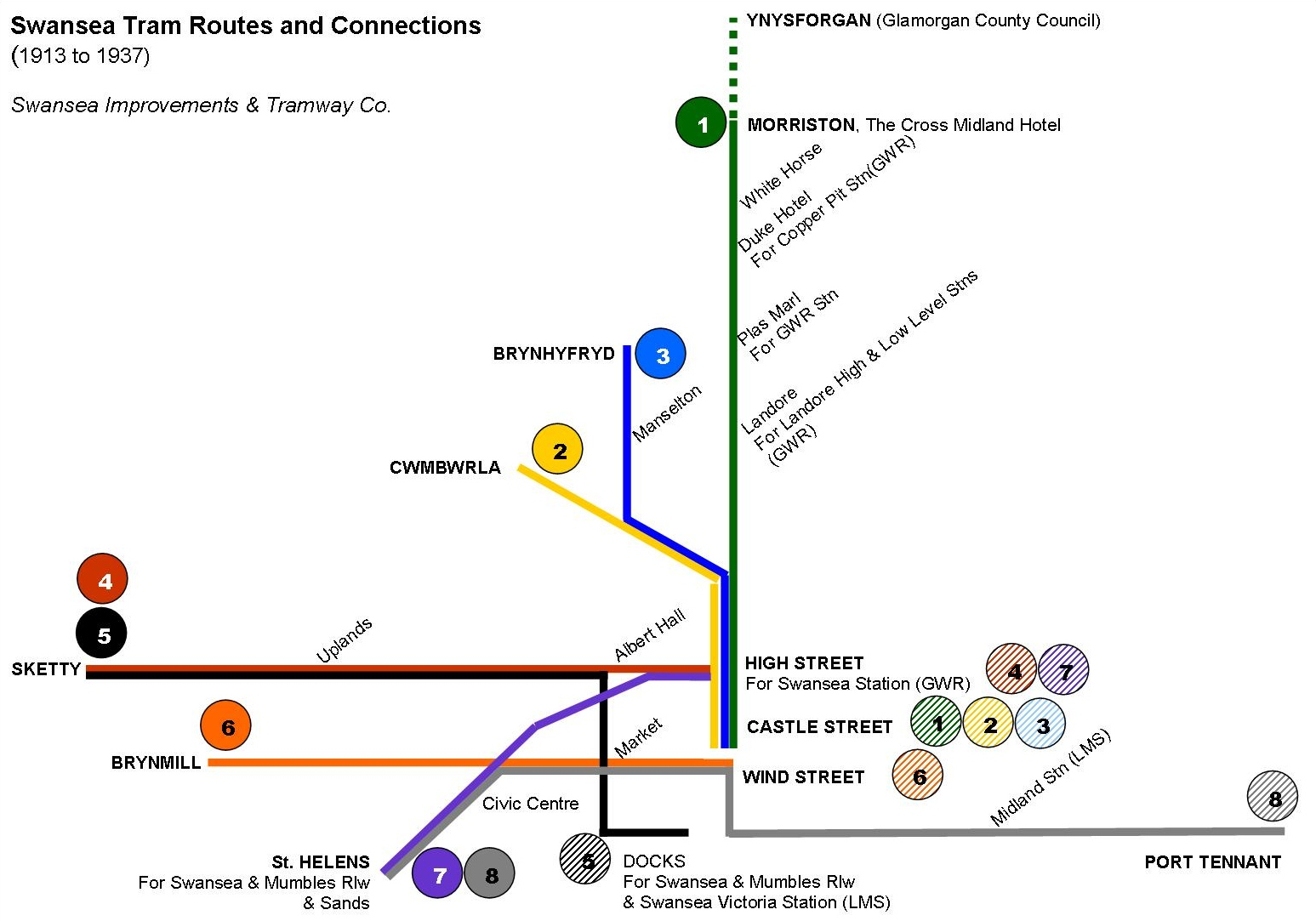
Final Route Plan

The company was highly innovative in overcoming the limitations of the low bridges and special low-height double-deck cars were introduced on the same design as cars built for Cardiff (see below), who had the same problem. The new cars provided a more profitable service for the Morriston and Docks services whilst normal height double-deck cars were used for the Sketty, St Helens and Brynmill routes, though single-deck cars continued to run on the very height-restricted Port Tennant route.

== Tramcars ==
Some privately owned tramways, such as the Bristol Tramways & Carriage Co., lived under the spectre of a possible compulsory take-over by the municipality (town or city council). This deterred them from investing in their tramcars, such that when the Bristol system closed in 1945, it was essentially still running the original tramcars of 1895. Swansea Corporation did try to take over the horse tramway in a scheme that coupled building an electric tramway with electric lighting and refuse destruction but its bill was refused by the parliamentary committee who considered it too speculative. The corporation and company could not agree on further expansion of the system until the corporation achieved two acts of Parliament to build four further lines. As the corporation did not seek to run these themselves, this provided the SITC with sufficient security to invest in their tramcars and infrastructure.

The SITC built and re-built many of their tramcars, recycling the tram numbers as they did. This made for at least two tramcar incarnations per car number: the original single deck bogie cars (Nos.16-30) had their bodies scrapped where Nos.16-21 were rebuilt to a more robust single deck design on refurbished bogies from 1916 onwards. Nos 22–30, however, became new lowbridge double deck, four axle cars, so nothing like the previous holders of these numbers. Car No.35 was delivered as a batch of 11 cars originally destined for Leeds but sold to Swansea in 1899, arriving as single deck cars. An upstairs was added in 1900, balcony top covers in 1907/08 but 35 was then scrapped and replaced in 1933 as a new lowbridge double deck car, one of the last to be built. Other cars remained to the end with minor modifications: the four ex-Weston-super-Mare open-top double deck cars (Nos.46-49) first had balcony top-covers added in 1913 and then were totally enclosed upstairs in 1922.

New trams were also bought to supplement the ones built in-house, mostly 23 Brush single deck cars around 1906-21 and later 13 lowbridge double deck cars for the Morriston route from 1923 to 1925. The variety and different incarnations of tramcars made for an interesting system for the enthusiast even if it did lack the prestige of the modern streamlined models being introduced in the 1930s by (mostly) larger cities such as Sheffield, Liverpool, Glasgow and Belfast.

== Closure ==
The closure of the street tram system by 29 June 1937 was part of a wave of UK closures in favour of buses or trolley buses, the SITC opting for the former as provided by South Wales Transport, later to become part of BET itself. Local opposition was fierce, but unlike many other European countries, trams were seen in the UK as less flexible and providing less comfort than buses and the decision was final. Luckily for Swansea and the Mumbles, the SMR continued until it, too, was closed in January 1960, by then owned by South Wales Transport, (itself owned by BET) giving Swansea first and last status for provision of electric traction in Wales.
