= Weston-super-Mare Tramways =

Tramway operator in England

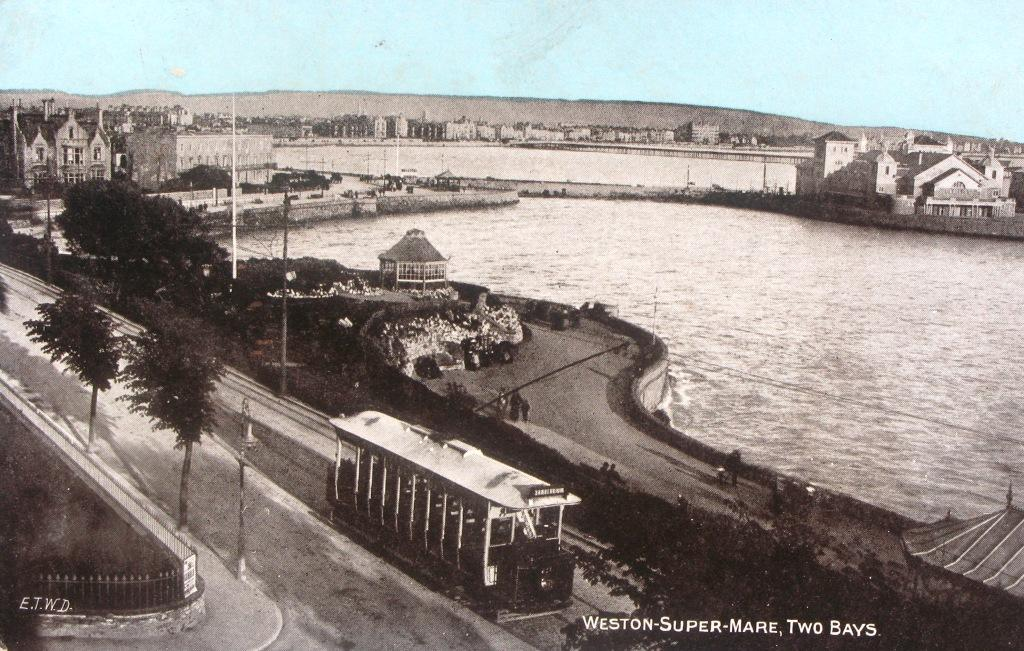
- A tram car at Madeira Cove

Operation
- Locale: Weston-super-Mare
- Open: 1902
- Close: 1937
- Status: Closed
- Routes: Old Pier to Sanatorium; Locking Road to Oxford Street
- Owner(s): Weston-super-Mare and District Electricity Supply Company

Infrastructure
- Track gauge: 1,435 mm (4 ft 8 1/2 in) standard gauge
- Propulsion system: 550v dc
- Depot(s): Locking Road
- Stock: 16 cars

Statistics
- Route length: 2.92 miles (4.70 km)
Overview
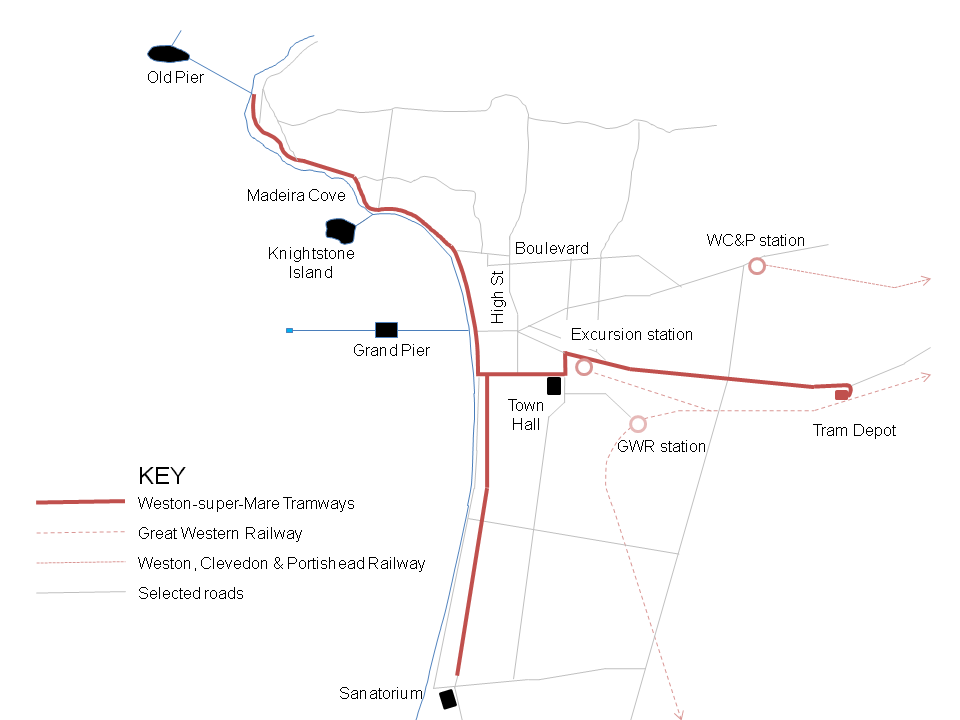

The Weston-super-Mare Tramways were the electric street tramways of the seaside resort of Weston-super-Mare in Somerset, England. It operated a fleet of up to 16 standard gauge single- and double-deck tramcars on routes totalling 2.92 miles (4.70 km) to Birnbeck Pier, The Sanatorium and Locking Road. It opened in 1902 and was replaced by bus services in 1937.

== History ==
Weston-super-Mare Tramways Act 1897
- Act of Parliament
- Parliament of the United Kingdom
- Long title: An Act for incorporating the Weston-super-Mare Tramways Company and authorising them to make and maintain Tramways and other Works at Weston-super-Mare and for other purposes.
- Citation: 60 & 61 Vict. c. ccxl

Dates
- Royal assent: 6 August 1897

There were three abortive schemes to open tramways in Weston-super-Mare during the last two decades of the nineteenth century. A scheme was promoted in 1882 for a 3 ft 6 in (1,067 mm) steam tram network to serve the railway station, the town centre and Birnbeck Pier. In 1885 the Weston, Clevedon and Portishead Tramway gained an act of Parliament, the Weston-super-Mare, Clevedon and Portishead Tramways Act 1885 (48 & 49 Vict. c. clxxxii), that allowed it to construct a tramway along The Boulevard, Gerrard Road and Milton Road to Ashcombe Road, from where it would continue across fields towards Portishead. Although rails were laid in 1894 they were taken up again three years later, and Ashcombe Road became the tramway's terminus when it finally opened to Clevedon later that year. Motive power had been authorised as either horse or steam power. Another act was passed, the Weston-super-Mare Tramways Act 1897 (60 & 61 Vict. c. ccxl) for a company named Drake and Gorham to build an electric tramway in the town, but the powers lapsed in 1899.

It was in 1899 that the Weston-super-Mare Urban District Council transferred their obligations to supply electricity in the town to the Weston-super-Mare and District Electricity Supply Company. This was a subsidiary of British Electric Traction and the following year they obtained powers in the Weston-Super-Mare Tramways Order 1900 for an electric tramway as a complementary venture. This was to be a 4 ft 8 1/2 in (1,435 mm) gauge line along Locking Road and Regent Street to the sea front, from where lines would run north to the Pier, and south to the Sanatorium (now the Royal Sands). Further branches were authorised along Ashcombe Road to serve the Weston, Clevedon and Portishead Railway station, and from Alexandra Parade to the Great Western Railway (GWR) station. Neither of these were built, and Regent Street was dropped in favour of a route along Oxford Street, a parallel road a little to the south. Construction started on 24 January 1902 and the route from Locking Road to Oxford Street and the Pier was opened on 13 May 1902, the same day as the opening of the new pavilion and public baths on Knightstone Island, towards the northern end of the sea front. The section to the Sanatorium opened four days later, on 17 May. The Grand Pier at the end of Regent Street opened on 11 June 1904, but ferries from Wales continued to serve the Old (Birnbeck) Pier, and so the tramway was kept busy bringing visitors down into the town centre. A short extension at the Old Pier allowed trams onto land belonging to the pier so that they could pick up from that pier's entrance. The Grand Pier Company tried to get the tramway to build a line along their pier but no powers were ever granted for this.

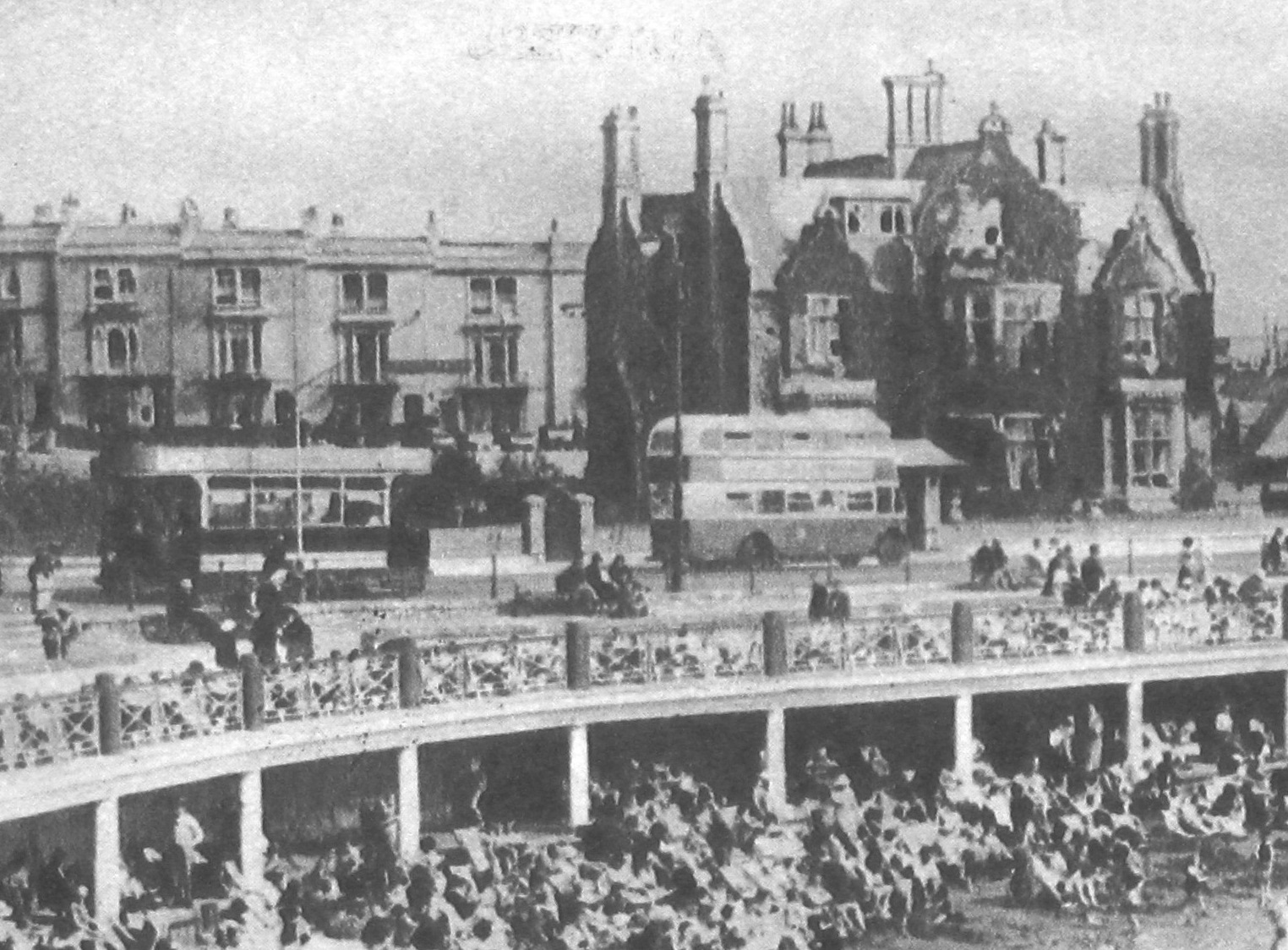
A tram and competing Bristol bus at the Marine Lake

Taxi drivers hated the introduction of the trams because they competed with the taxis' flourishing business. When the tram line first opened, drivers attempted many different tactics to obstruct the trams, but their methods (which included driving their carriages at slow speeds along the tram lines) only resulted in proceedings in magistrates' court that ended in favour of the tram line.

The Old Pier extension led to angry confrontations with horse carriage operators who were barred from the pier's land. Further competition came in the form of motor buses. Local operator Burnell was taken over by the Bristol Tramways Company in 1934, and other services in the town were operated by the GWR's road motors. An agreement was soon reached with the Bristol company to close the tramway. The purchase price was £15,000 (equivalent to £1,220,000 in 2023),, and they paid the Urban District Council another £5,000 (equivalent to £410,000 in 2023), to lift the rails. The last trams ran on 17 April 1937.

== Services ==
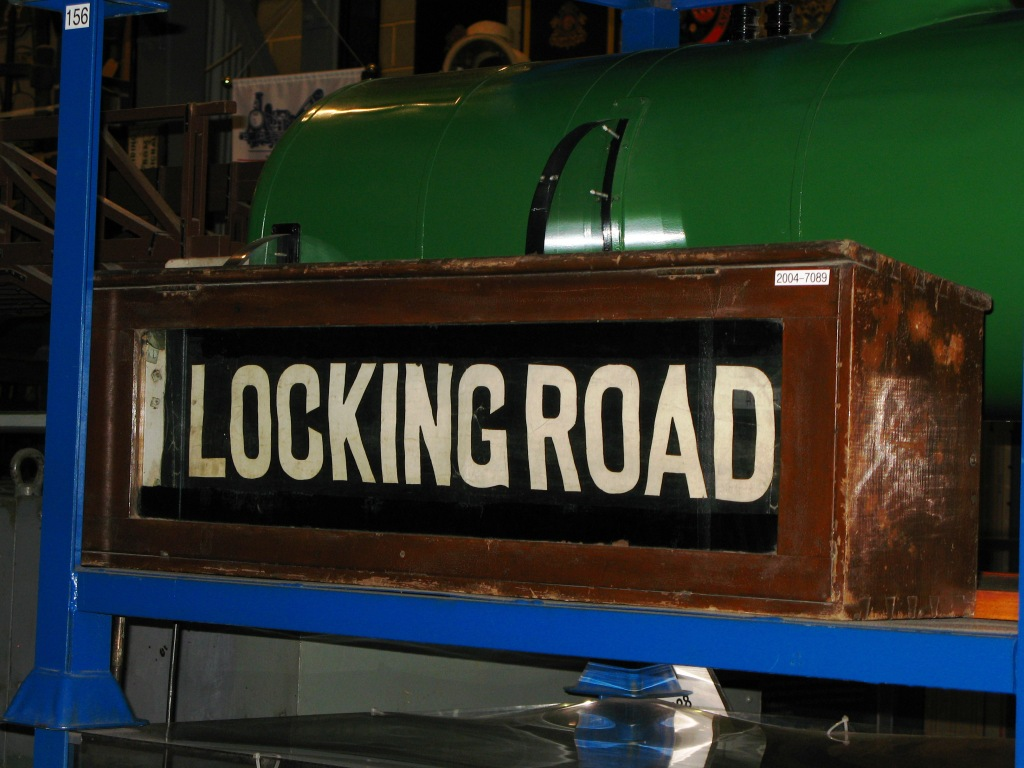
The destination indicator from a Weston tram preserved at the National Railway Museum.

Two separate services were generally operated, the busiest one being between the Old Pier and Sanatorium via the Grand Pier. The other route saw services from the Old Pier to Locking Road, although in summer they often ran only between Oxford Street and Locking Road to leave the sea front clear for Old Pier services. The third side of the triangle at the Grand Pier Junction was never used for services, and any movements from the depot towards the Sanatorium usually ran towards the pier then reversed as the arrangement of overhead wires made this easier for the crews. Short services were sometimes operated between the Old Pier and Grand Pier, or between the railway excursion station and the Grand Pier to cope with large crowds of visitors arriving by boat or train respectively. Extra services also operated from Knightstone to the town centre after theatre performances in the pavilion.

From the northern limit of the network at the Old Pier, the line ran past the Royal Pier Hotel, Madeira Cove, Knightstone Causeway and along the sea front to the Grand Pier. A short distance beyond here the line turned slightly inland to Grand Pier Junction at the end of Oxford Street, from where the sea front line continued along the landward side of the Beach Lawns to the Sanatorium.

The junction gave access to the Locking Road branch. After running the length of Oxford Street to the Town Hall, the line turned left into Walliscote Road then right into Locking Road by the railway excursion station (the site of the present day Plaza cinema and Tesco supermarket). The line continued eastward to the Ashcombe Road junction which was initially the terminus of passenger services. They were later extended a little further past the girls' school to the corner of Langport Road. The line continued beyond here a short distance to the tram depot (now the site of a gymnasium) but this was only used by empty trams.

== Engineering ==
The track was laid to 4 ft 8 1/2 in (1,435 mm) gauge with rail weighing 90 lb per yard (44.29 kg/m). The tightest curve was 42 feet (13 m). The road surface between and alongside the rails was laid with basalt setts, but this was later changed to granite setts and wood blocks. The only gradient was 1 in 25 rising toward the Old Pier at Madeira Cove. The track was single with frequent passing loops. It was laid on one side of the road to allow for it to be easily doubled if traffic demanded it.

Electricity was generated at the company's power station in Locking Road. It was supplied to the trams at 550 volts using overhead wires. These were carried above the northbound line on the seafront, so the collecting poles swung out to the side as southbound cars ran through the loops. After the tramway closed the poles supporting the overhead were retained for many years to carry street lights.

== Tram cars ==
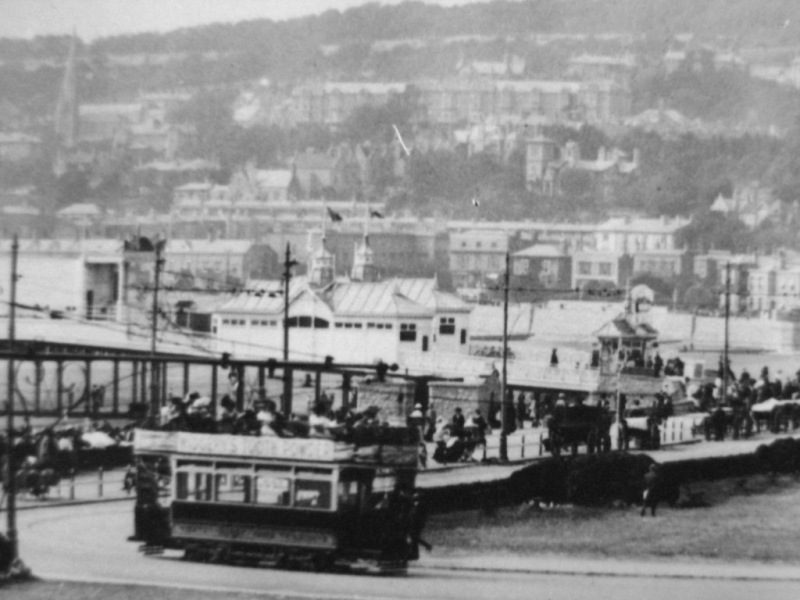
Double-deck car number 1

16 cars were in service in 1903, but this was soon reduced to 12 but increased again to 14 in 1927. This gave the fleet three different types of car. The largest group were 12 double-deck cars. The driver operated from an open platform which also gave access to the enclosed lower deck and open upper deck. On 10 September 1903 a storm caused the sea to flood part of the town. A yacht was blown onto the sea front where it got entangled in the overhead wires, and water caused serious damage to four of the double deck cars. These were taken out of service and sold to the Swansea Tramway which had the facilities to repair them. They were not replaced at Weston-super-Mare and the numbers of the surviving double-deck cars were changed to fill up the gaps left in the number sequence.

Also delivered in 1903 were 4 single-deck cars, which the driver again operated from an open platform. The sides of the cars were open but a red-and-white striped curtain could be let down in bad weather to give passengers some protection. 'Cross benches' were fitted right across the body for the passengers to sit upon, and a footboard was fitted along each side which the conductor walked on while the car was moving so that he could sell tickets. Two slightly larger single-deck cars were delivered in 1927.

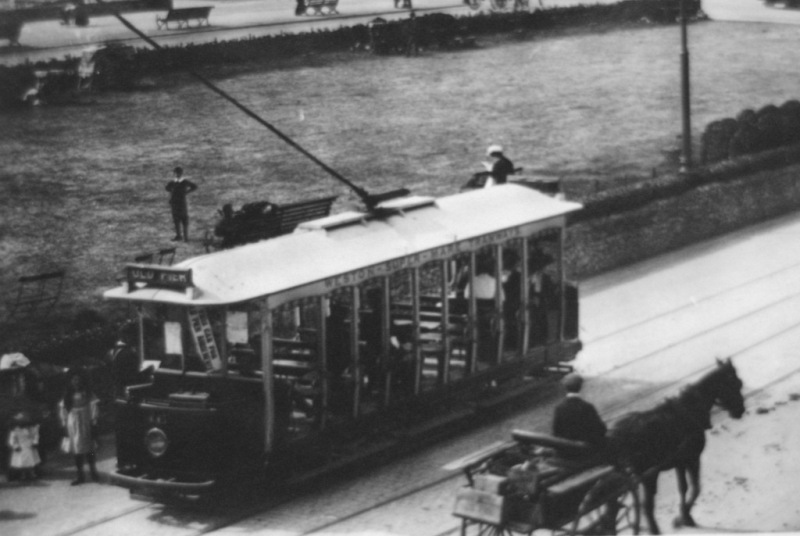
Single-deck car number 16

The main part of the car bodies were painted crimson lake but this faded to brown. The panels were initially edged with gold leaf but this was later discontinued. The underframe, beam, fenders and panels below windows were painted Indian red. The bulkheads, rocker panels and side stanchions were cream, the roof was white, and decency boards along the top deck grey. Inside panels were varnished wood and brass handrails were fitted.

When the trams were taken out of service souvenir hunters stripped many fittings off them, including a destination box. The cars were advertised for sale in the local newspaper, the Weston Mercury. A number of the seats were bought for use on the Grand Pier, and railings from the double deck cars were used for fencing at Banwell.

Numbers	In service	Type	Seats	Truck	Wheelbase
1–8	1903–1937	Double deck	50 later 57	Brill 21E	6 feet (1.8 m)
9–12	1903–1903	Double deck	50	Brill 21E	6 feet (1.8 m)
13–16	1903–1937	Single deck	44	Brill 21E	6 feet (1.8 m)
17–18	1927–1937	Single deck	52	Brill Radiax	9 feet (2.7 m)

== Depot ==
The cars were all maintained at a depot in Locking Road next to the electricity generating station. The entrance to the depot was at the east end which meant that cars made a 180˚ turn between there and the track in Locking Road.

There were seven tracks in the depot, the northern six of which were covered by a shed approximately 200 feet (61 m) by 75 ft (23 m). This had 3 ft (0.91 m) dwarf concrete walls supporting corrugated iron walls and roof. At the west end of the shed were staff facilities and blacksmith's shop.

After four cars had been sold in 1904 two tracks were lifted. One was relaid to accommodate the extra cars when the fleet was expanded in 1927 but the outside road, used for car washing, was lifted. In its place a pair of sidings were laid from the GWR line which ran along the southern side of the site. This was used by wagons bringing coal to the generating station, which were winched up to the coal hopper at the west end of the siding for unloading.

== Proposed new networks ==
In 2010 two different schemes were proposed to build new tram networks in the town.

In September 2010, Ferguson Mann, an architect proposing a regeneration plan for The Tropicana site on the seafront, suggested that a pneumatic tram should replace the current land train that carries visitors along the sea front. This would run from the Old Pier to the Royal Sands, as the old tram used to.

November 2010 saw a different proposal from the Tram Power company for an £80 million double-track network that would be of use to both visitors and residents. Like the old network, this would have one line along the seafront and another running eastwards into the town. This second route would be extended much further eastward than before to serve the M5 motorway junction at Worle. Individual trams would cost between £1.3 and £1.7 million each.

== See also ==
- Open top buses in Weston-super-Mare
