= Somerset Passenger Solutions =

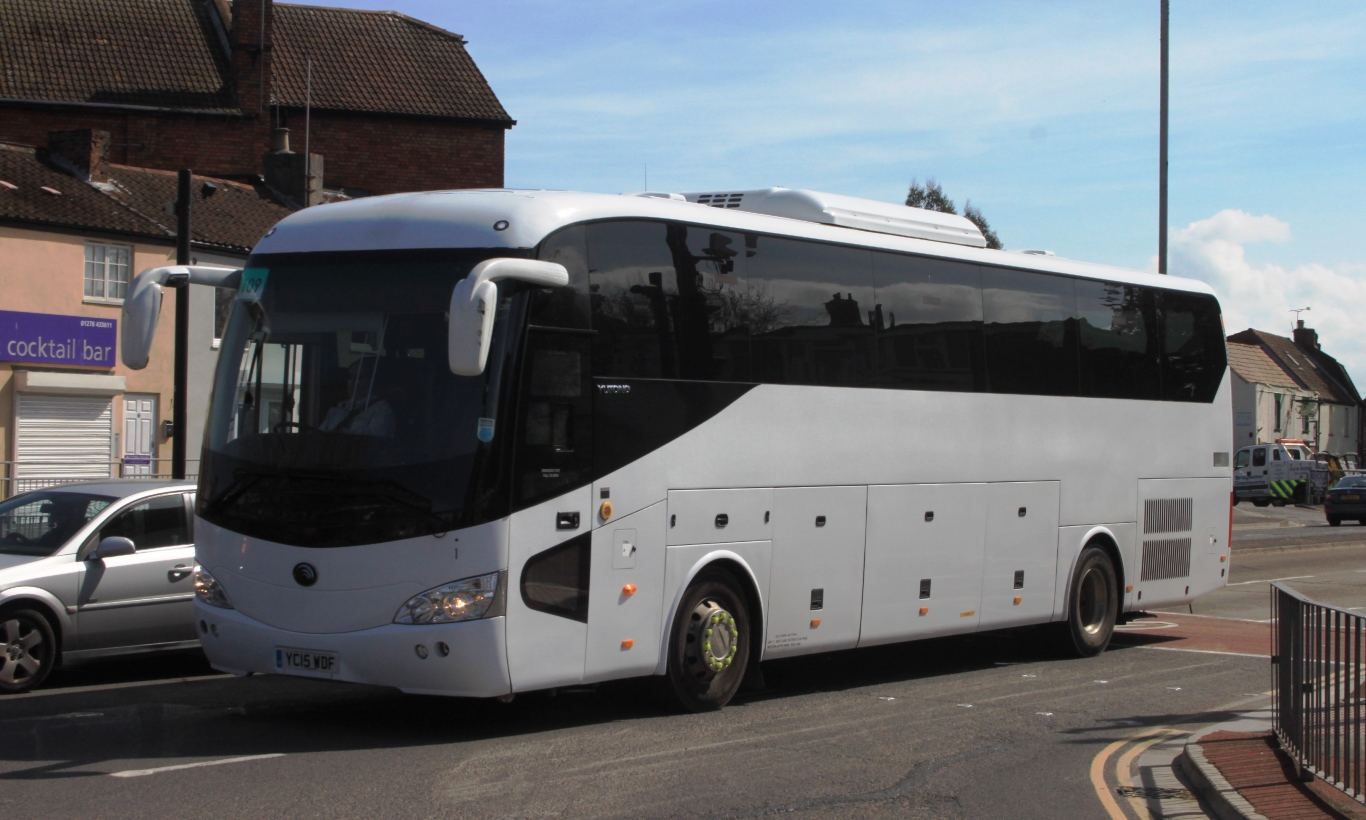
- Yutong ZK6129H in Bridgwater in April 2017
- Parent: Buses of Somerset
- Founded: 2016; 9 years ago
- Headquarters: Bridgwater
- Service area: Somerset
- Website: www.somersetpassengersolutions.co.uk

Somerset Passenger Solutions is the trading name of bus and coach operator based in Bridgwater, Somerset, England. Originally set up as a joint venture with JJP Holdings South West, it is now a wholly owned subsidiary of FirstGroup's Specialist Passenger Solutions.

== History ==
Specialist Passenger Solutions commenced operating staff and community services in 2016 during the construction of EDF Energy's Hinkley Point C nuclear power station. The contract is scheduled to run until 2025 and at its peak will require 160 buses.

It was a 50/50 joint venture between First Group's Buses of Somerset and JJP Holdings South West's Southern National, owned by former Crosville Motor Services proprietor Jonathan Jones-Pratt. Southern National's name is revived from that of a former National Bus Company subsidiary. Its operation was not affected by the April 2018 cessation of Crosville. In October 2021 Buses of Somerset took 100% ownership.

In 2023, the company was renamed Specialist Passenger Solutions, reflecting its aim to work outside of Somerset, such as transporting staff for the construction of the Sizewell C nuclear power station in Suffolk.

== Accidents and incidents ==
A Wright StreetDeck double-deck bus crashed on the A39 road near Bridgwater on the morning of 17 January 2023 while carrying passengers to Hinkley Point. An investigation concluded that ice on the road was the significant factor in the incident which resulted in the bus leaving the road and falling on its side. 53 people were injured.

== Fleet ==
In December 2021 the Somerset Passenger Solutions fleet included consisted of 54 Yutong and 8 Mercedes-Benz Tourismo coaches, 35 Wright StreetDeck double-decker buses, 32 Alexander Dennis Enviro200 MMC single-decker buses and 5 Ford Transit minibuses. They are maintained at a depot in Bridgwater.
