= Birnbeck Pier =

Pier in Weston-super-Mare

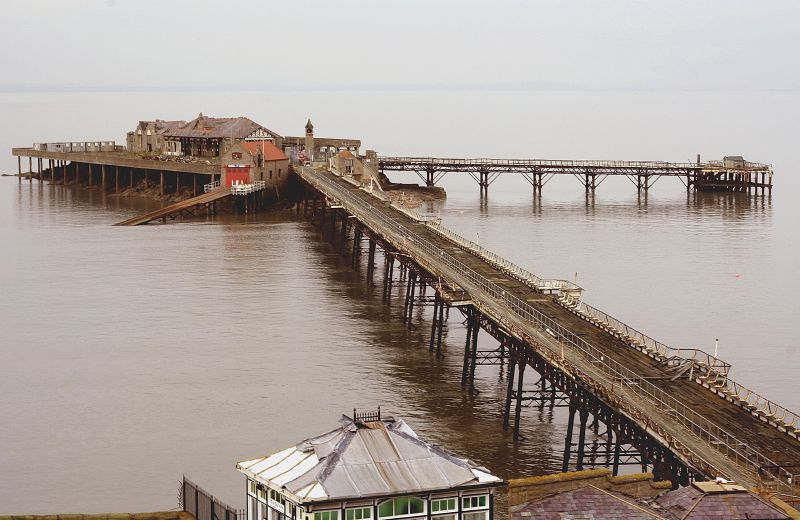
- Birnbeck Pier and Island
- Type: Island and pleasure pier
- Location: Weston-super-Mare, Bristol Channel, England
- Coordinates: 51.3565°N 2.9945°W
- Official name: Birnbeck Pier
- Owner: North Somerset Council

Characteristics
- Total length: 1,150 feet (351 m)

History
- Designer: Eugenius Birch
- Opening date: 5 June 1867

Birnbeck Pier, also known as the 'Old Pier', is a pier and island situated on the Bristol Channel in Weston-super-Mare, North Somerset, England, approximately 18 miles (29 km) south-west of Bristol. It is the only pier in the country which links the mainland to an island, linking to Birnbeck Island (previously Berne Island or Bairn Beck Island), a 1.2-hectare (3-acre) rocky island just to the west of Worlebury Hill. The grade II* listed pier was designed by Eugenius Birch and opened in 1867. Birnbeck Pier is one of only six Grade II* piers surviving in the country. The refreshment and waiting rooms of 1898 were designed by local architect Hans Price and the clocktower and the piermaster's house have been attributed to him.

During the second half of the 19th and early 20th centuries the pier was popular with locals and tourists. As a boarding point for steamers plying their trade in the Bristol Channel, it underwent various extensions and modifications over the years. During the Second World War the pier was commissioned as HMS Birnbeck by the Admiralty as part of the Directorate of Miscellaneous Weapons Development (DMWD) for research into new weapons. Its work included conducting trials on the Barnes Wallis 'bouncing bomb'.

The pier reopened after the war, but the number of visitors and steamer passengers declined. The final excursion visited the pier in 1979. The pier has been closed to the public since 1994 and is on the Buildings at Risk Register and part of it collapsed during storms in 2015. The pier was purchased by North Somerset Council in July 2023 with the aim of restoring it and reopening the lifeboat station which was moved off the pier in 2011.

== Birnbeck Island ==
The origin of the name Birnbeck is unknown but may take the 'beck' from the Scandinavian word 'bekk', a bench in literary Old Norse. Alternatively Birnbeck could be from the Old Irish 'berna bec', a 'little gap' because of the narrow channel separating the island from Worlebury Hill. Local people sometimes pronounced it as Be-arn Beck into the early years of the twentieth century.

The rock of which the island is formed is limestone, giving rise to the geological term "Birnbeck Limestone Formation". It is just offshore below Worlebury Hillfort and the area was used for fishing. 'Stalls' were used here into the nineteenth century consisting of nets strung between wooden stakes set into the soft mud. These trapped fish which could be collected at low tide. People were employed as 'gull-yellers' to scare off the gulls that were attracted to the fish; they lived in huts on the island in the summer.

The Bristol Channel has the second highest tidal range in the world but the island could be accessed by a natural causeway at low tide before the pier was constructed. The fast flowing water between the island and mainland could be dangerous. The two eldest sons of the Elton family from Clevedon Court were drowned when they were cut off by the rising tide while searching for shells in 1819.

== History ==
Weston-super-Mare Pier Act 1846
- Act of Parliament
- Parliament of the United Kingdom
- Long title: An Act for constructing a Pier, and forming necessary Approaches thereto, in the Parish of Weston-super-Mare in the County of Somerset.
- Citation: 9 & 10 Vict. c. xxv

Dates
- Royal assent: 18 June 1846

A proposal was made in 1845 to connect Birnbeck Island to the mainland at the western end of Worlebury Hill. A company was formed under the Weston-super-Mare Pier Act 1846 with approved capital of £20,000. Work started on a suspension bridge designed by James Dredge to link the mainland with the island in 1847. One pillar had been partly built when it was damaged during a storm. The company did not have sufficient funds to restart the work so was wound up. Some of the stonework is still visible alongside the pier at low tide

=== Construction ===
Weston-super-Mare Pier Act 1862
- Act of Parliament
- Parliament of the United Kingdom
- Long title: An Act for constructing and maintaining a Pier at Weston-super-Mare in the County of Somerset.
- Citation: 25 & 26 Vict. c. clxix

Dates
- Royal assent: 17 July 1862

Text of statute as originally enacted

Weston-super-Mare Pier (Extension) Act 1864
- Act of Parliament
- Parliament of the United Kingdom
- Long title: An Act for enlarging the Powers of "The Weston-super-Mare Pier Act, 1862;" and for other Purposes.
- Citation: 27 & 28 Vict. c. clv

Dates
- Royal assent: 30 June 1864

Text of statute as originally enacted

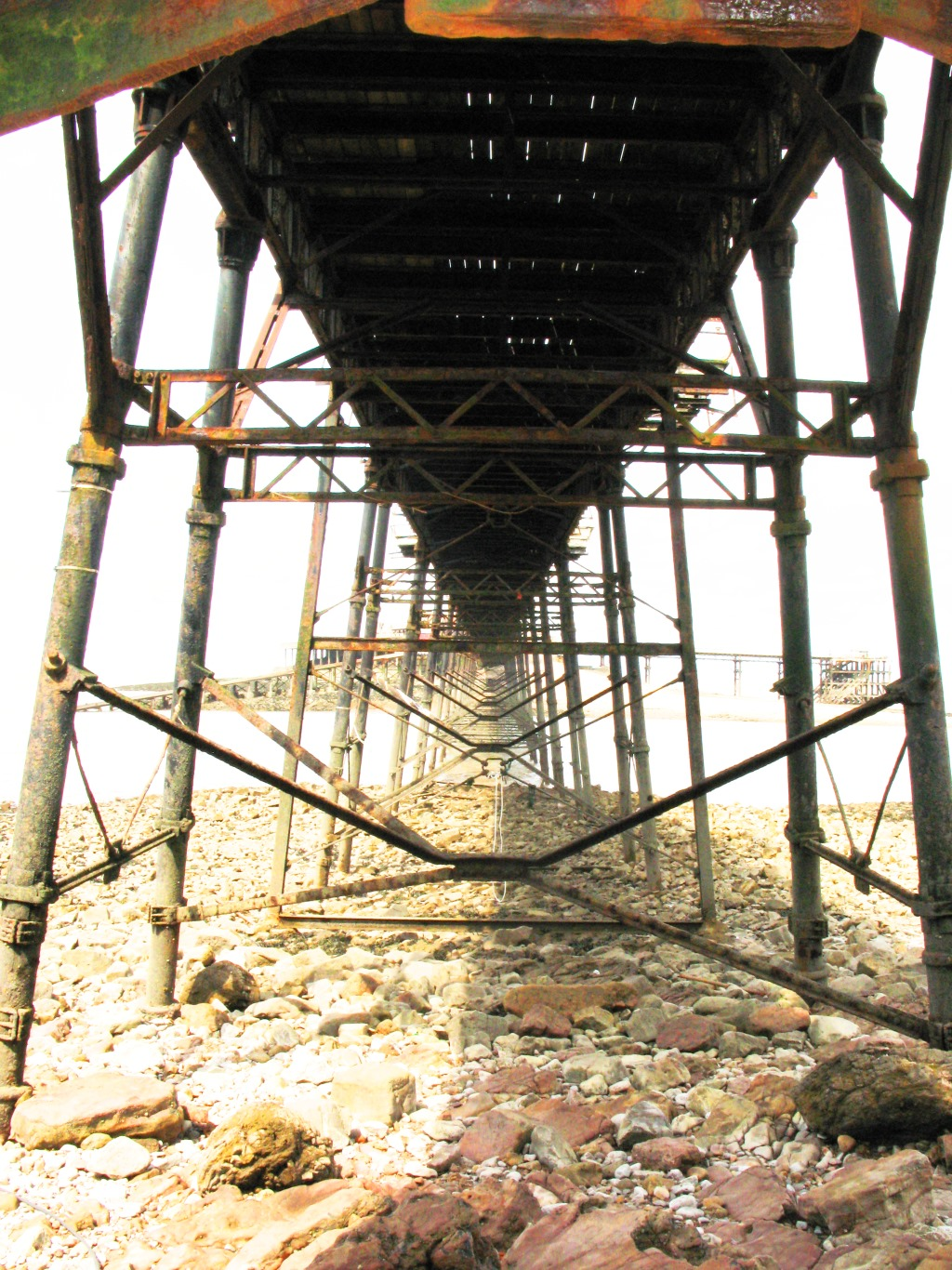
The piles and girders

In 1864, a new proposal was made to build a pier across to the island, funded by 2,000 shares which raised £20,000. Cecil Hugh Smyth Pigott, the four-year-old son of the lord of the manor, laid the foundation stone on 28 October 1864 when a public holiday was declared in the town and a celebratory dinner was held in the town hall.

The main pier was originally 1,150 feet (351 m) long, and it is 20 feet (6 m) wide with a cantilever construction. However the low water jetty was damaged in a storm in 1903, rebuilt in 1909 and finally dismantled in 1923 meaning that the pier is now 1,040 feet (317 m) long, Due to architectural features such as abutments at either end of the pier, the pier resembles a bridge more than other pleasure piers. Fifteen groups of piles support a continuous lattice girder, each set comprising four piles screwed into the river bed at an angle with an X-brace between each adjacent pair. The fitting of screw blades to iron piles, as opposed to the then accepted wooden pile, created a deeper and far more resilient base support. This was one of the innovations brought by Eugenius Birch which have enabled many of the piers he designed to survive. There were problems with oscillations in the structure when bands marched on the pier, both on the opening day and again in 1886. As a result, further horizontal cross braces were added to the piles, and a law was passed banning marching on the pier. The gothic toll house and pierhead buildings were designed by local architect Hans Price.

To allow steamers to bring day trippers to Weston-super-Mare from ports on both the English and Welsh side of the Bristol Channel, a landing jetty was extended on the west side of the island. The Severn Estuary has the second highest tidal range in the world second only to the Bay of Fundy in Eastern Canada. The estuary's funnel shape, its tidal range, and the underlying geology of rock, gravel and sand, produce strong tidal streams and high turbidity, giving the water a notably brown colouration. The tidal range means that the legs of the pier are largely exposed at low tide and hidden at high tide.

=== Operation ===
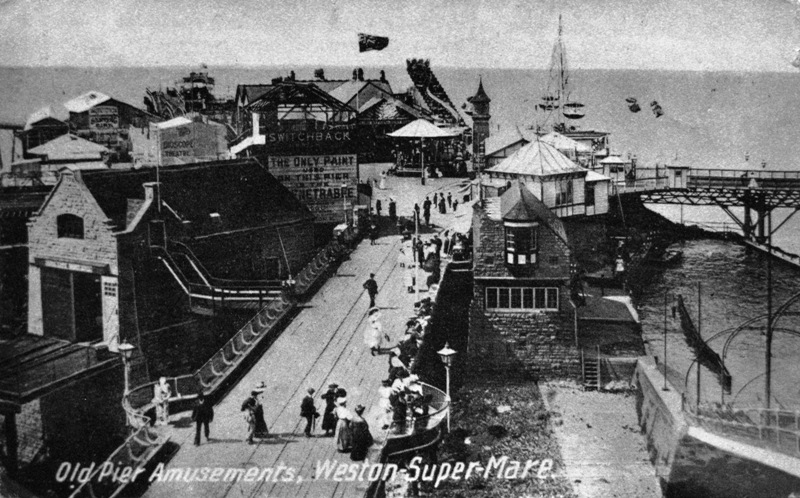
Amusements on the pier, circa 1910. The lifeboat station of 1902 is on the left.

When the pier opened on 5 June 1867, again by Cecil Hugh Smyth Pigott, many of the people of Weston-super-Mare were given a holiday and a banquet was held in the Town Hall. The toll to walk on the pier was 1d (an old penny), but this was quickly raised to 2d, which was the maximum fee permitted by the General Pier and Harbour Act 1861 (24 & 25 Vict. c. 45). 120,000 people paid the toll in the first three months. A tramway system was installed to carry the luggage of passengers arriving at the pier.

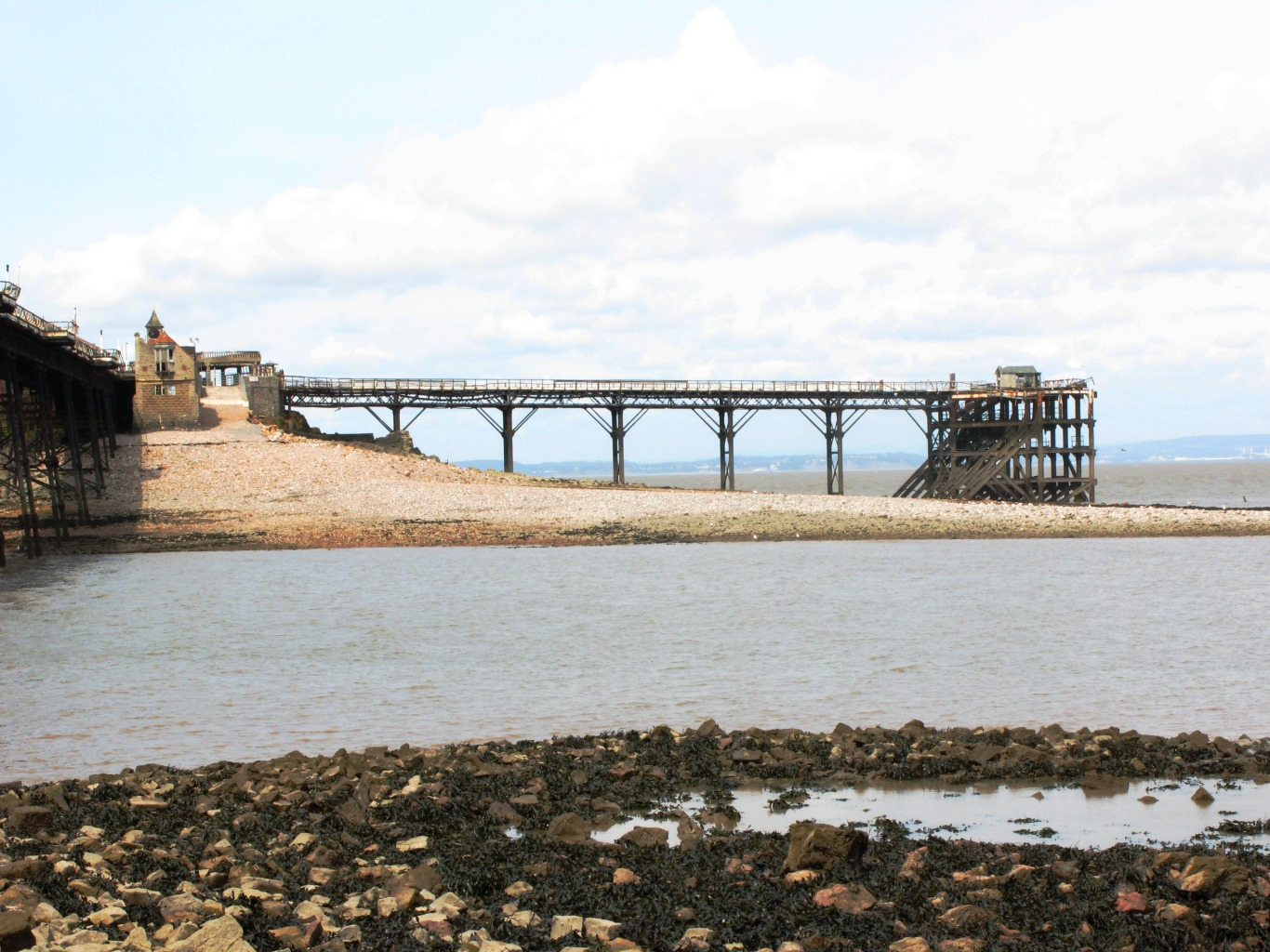
The north jetty built in 1905

A new wooden northern jetty was added in 1872 which allowed the removal of the original western landing place. Another jetty was built on the south west corner in 1898 which reached deep water even at low tide, thus allowing steamers to use the pier at all states of the tide. This was damaged in a gale in 1903, and although it was rebuilt in 1909, it closed in 1916 and was dismantled in 1923. The northern jetty had also been damaged in the 1903 storm but was replaced by the present steel structure in 1903–4

A second pier, known as the "Grand Pier", was opened in the centre of Weston-super-Mare in 1904. Although it had the capacity to accommodate steamers, it was seldom used due to difficult currents around the structure. An electric tram along the seafront ran to and from the pier approach road at Birnbeck.

Many visitors arriving on the steamers never left the pier and Birnbeck Island which between them housed the cafe, pavilion, amusements and funfair. These were destroyed by fire on 26 December 1897 and replaced by the present buildings, although these have been altered over the years. The attractions included Mutoscopes, a shooting gallery, merry-go-round, park swings, a theatre of wonders and a licensed bar. In 1891 a telephone was installed only six months after the first one was installed in the town. In 1909, the amusement area was expanded by an extension on iron supports along the south side of the island. However, this was not built to the proper specifications so was demolished in 1912; a larger concrete platform was added in its place in 1932.

The pier was taken over by the Admiralty in 1941 as an outpost of the Directorate of Miscellaneous Weapons Development (DMWD). It was commissioned as HMS Birnbeck and was used for secret weapons development and storage with testing. The "bouncing bomb" was tested at the Brean Down Fort on the opposite side of Weston Bay. After the war, the pier resumed its role as a tourist attraction, but business declined due to competition from the Grand Pier which opened its amusement arcades in 1946.

In 1962 the Birnbeck Pier Company sold the pier to P & A Campbell, the steamer operators. After the withdrawal of their ships it was sold to John Critchley, who redeveloped it as a "Victorian pleasure centre" which even had special permission to issue its own currency to visitors. There have since been several proposals to make the pier a commercial success again, including converting it into a hotel, casino, residential use, or the centre of a marina.

The most successful steamer company serving the Bristol Channel was P & A Campbell's "White Funnel" fleet. Their operations were suspended during the Second World War, after which the number of passengers decreased with the availability of cheap foreign holidays and the opening of the Severn Bridge in the 1960s. Regular ferries ceased serving Birnbeck in 1971 and the final excursion was made 19 October 1979. The pleasure "steamers" PS Waverley and MV Balmoral still operate in the Bristol Channel, but any calls at Weston are made by a connecting tender from Knightstone Harbour.

=== Dereliction ===
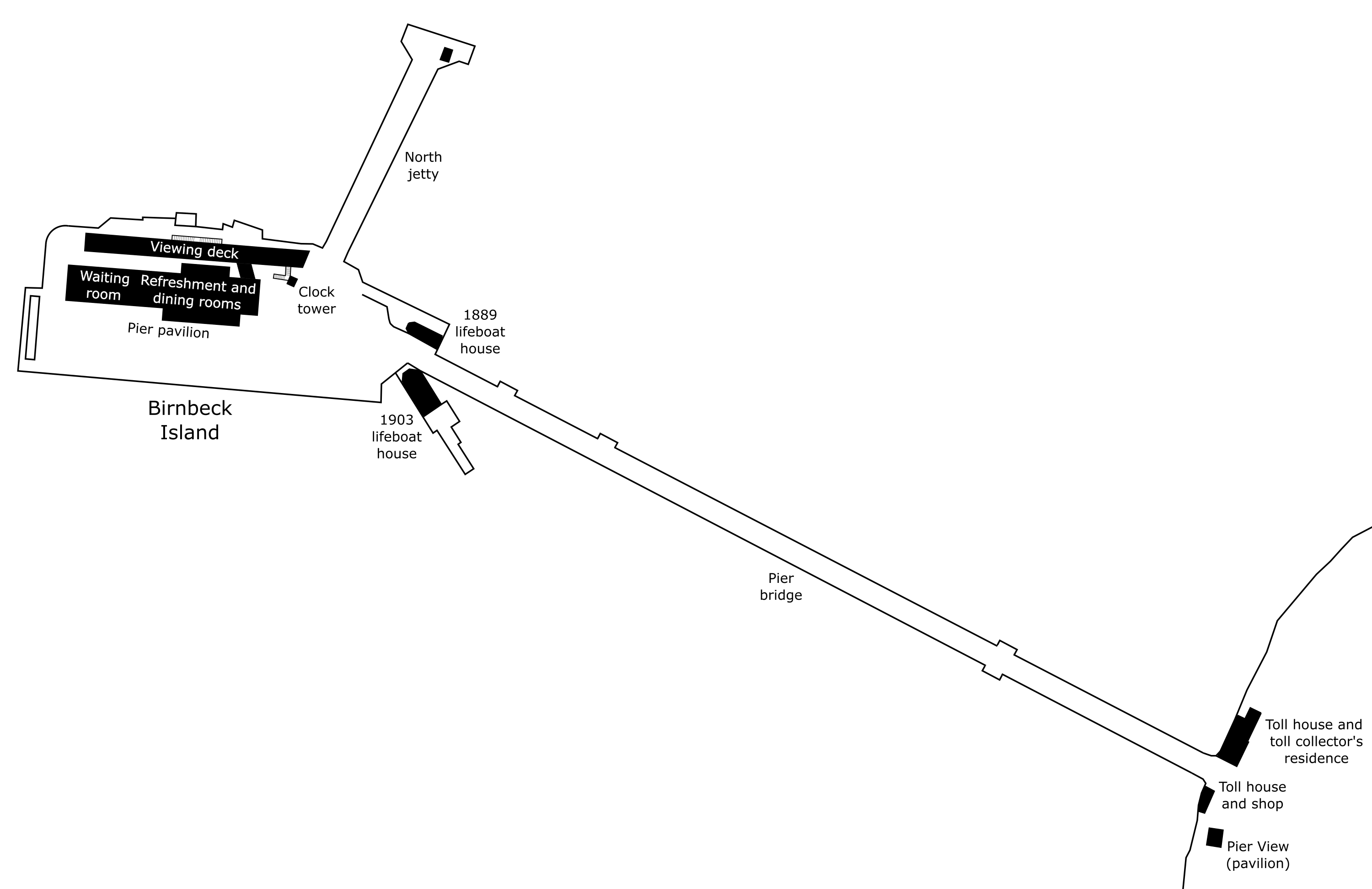
A plan of Birnbeck Pier and its key surviving features.

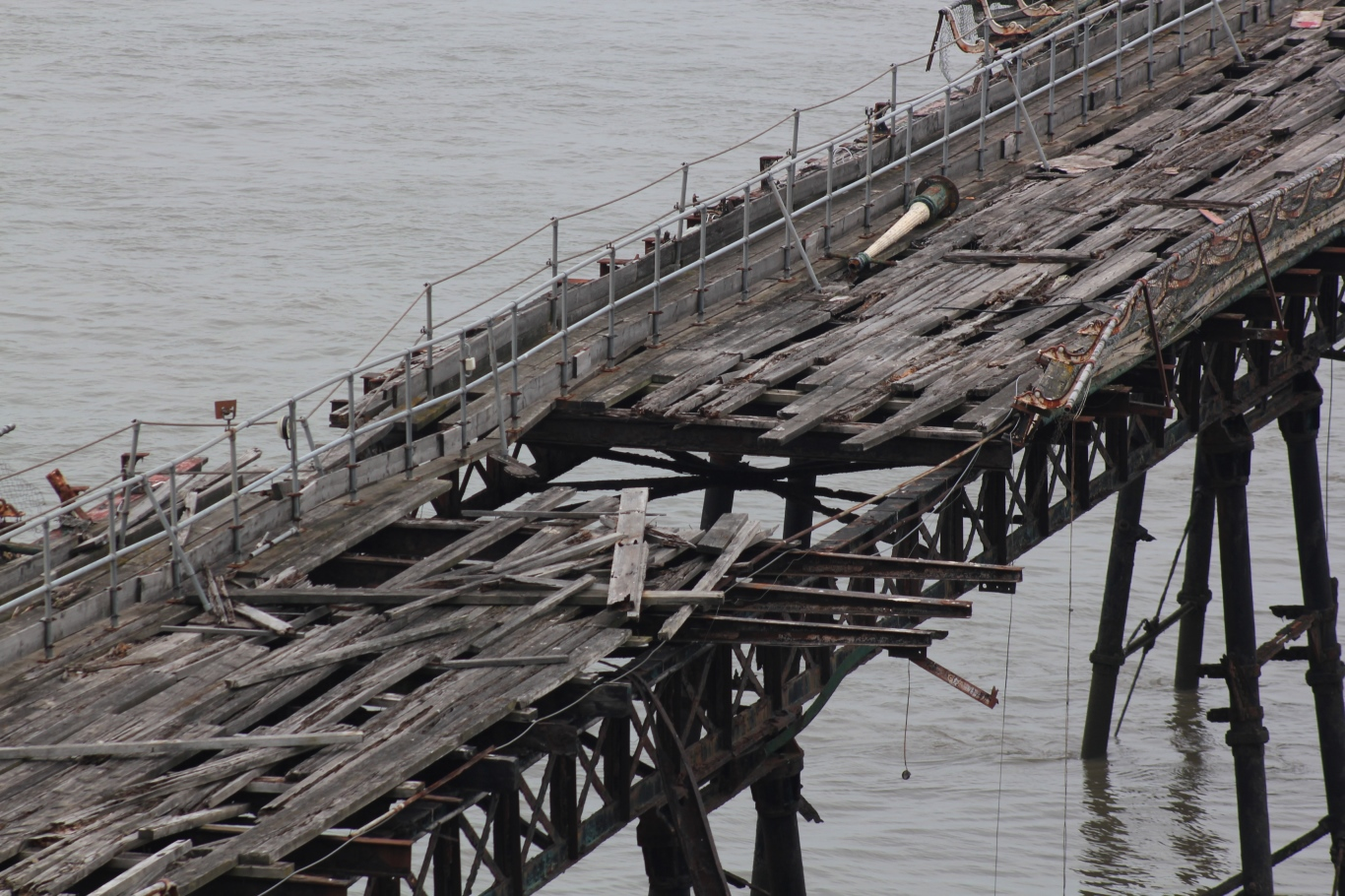
Damaged decking and girders in 2023

In 1984, £1 million of damage was caused to the pier by drifting equipment during engineering work in Sand Bay, to the north of the pier. The damage was quickly repaired, despite fears that Birnbeck might become like nearby Clevedon Pier, which at the time was severed by a collapsed span. The pier was again badly damaged by storms in 1990 and access was restricted by the owner for a time and the lifeboat was temporarily stationed at uphill but the council enforced a full closure on health and safety grounds in 1994. Due to the decline, English Heritage has placed it on the Heritage at Risk Register.

In 2006 the pier was sold to Manchester company Urban Splash. The new owners and the Royal Institute of British Architects (RIBA) launched a competition in August 2007, inviting people to submit ideas for the regeneration of the pier and island. At the time, the repair work required was estimated at £4 million. There were 95 entries for the competition from around the world. The winner of the design competition, Levitate Architecture and Design Studio Ltd, was announced in March 2008. The winning design included a dozen luxury apartments and a 50-room hotel.

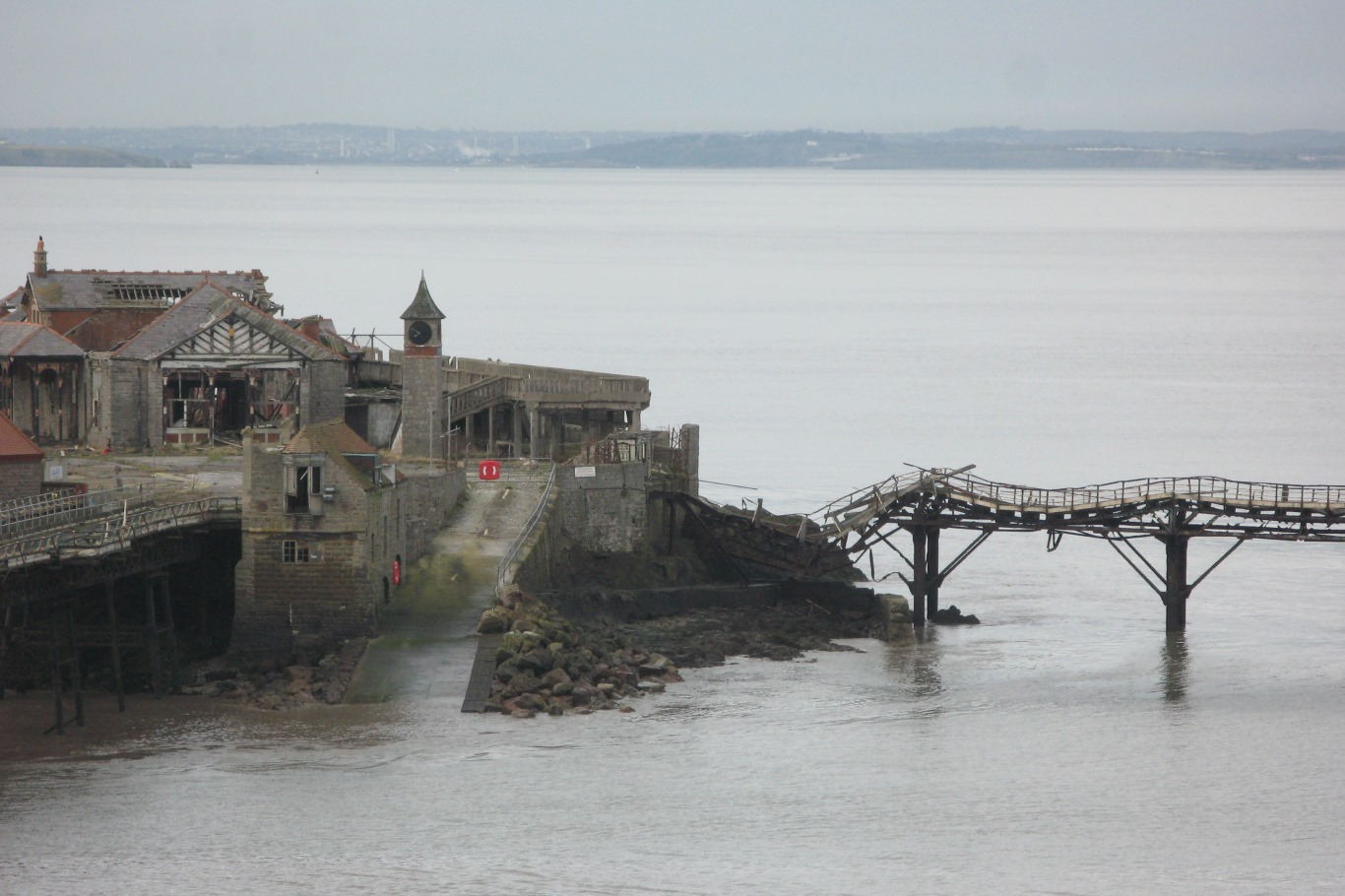
North jetty after collapse in 2015

In September 2010 Urban Splash placed the pier up for sale, citing a downfall in business caused by the recession as their reason.

In September 2011 Wahid Samady and Michael Ross were reported to have bought Birnbeck Pier for an undisclosed sum; Samady had also been awarded planning permission for a new development at the nearby Royal Pier Hotel site, just yards from the pier. In August 2012 further reports suggests the sale had not proceeded and that Urban Splash were still the owners. It was bought by CNM Estates of which Wahid Samady is chairman and Michael Ross is a director in 2014. In 2015 the Victorian Society included the pier on its list of the ten most endangered buildings.

Part of the north pier collapsed during storms on 30 December 2015. In May 2019, Neil and Ryan Andrews were each sentenced at Bristol Crown Court to 18 months imprisonment for the attempted theft of the clock face from the pier's tower. The judge, noting that the tower and clock had survived the 1897 fire, an attack by the Luftwaffe and an accidental mine attack, said the damage caused was "highly visible and irreparable" and that the Andrews "will always be known as the two men who destroyed the history; it was vandalism and theft for greed".

=== Restoration ===
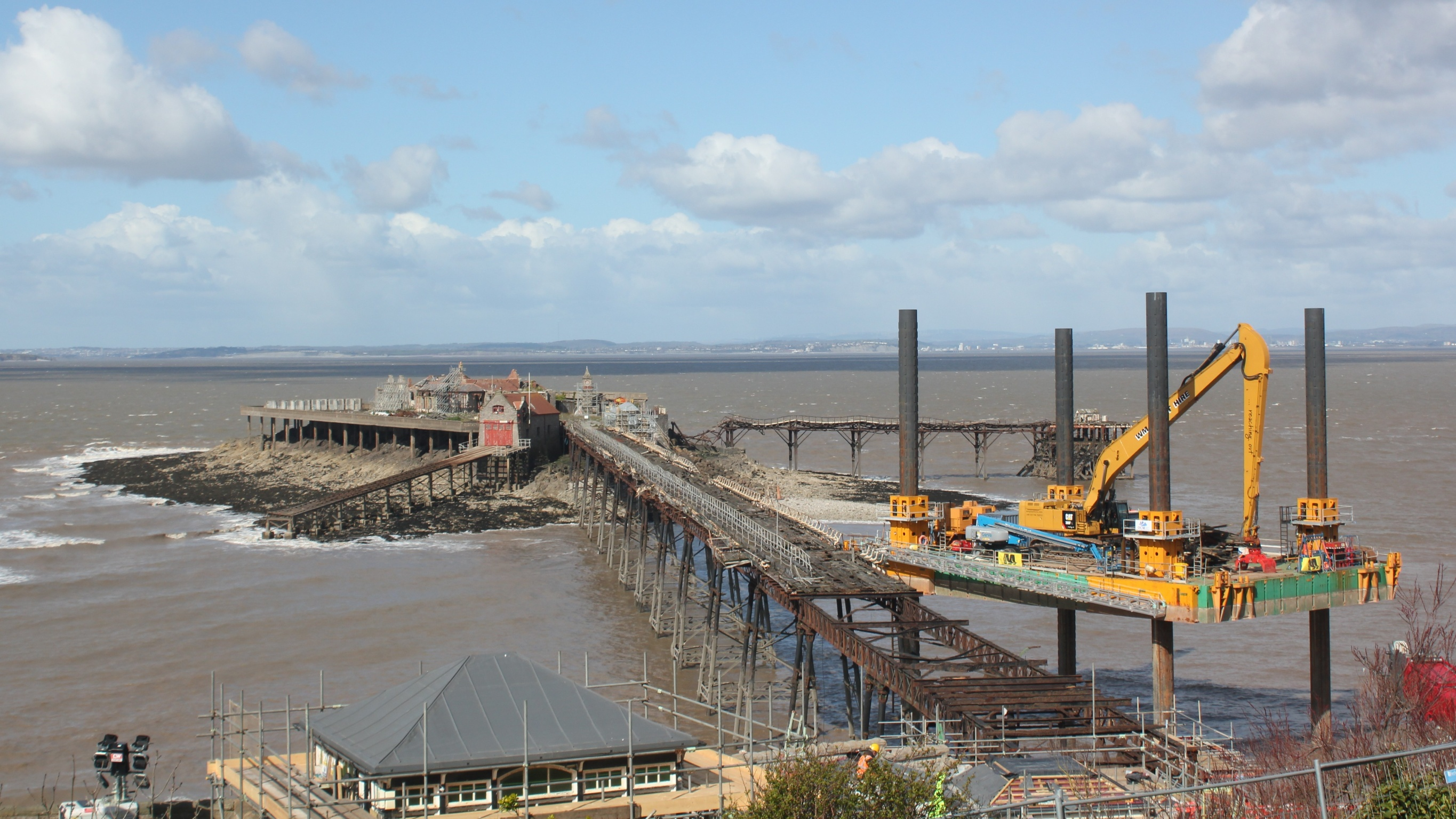
Restoration work in 2026

In February 2020, North Somerset Council started a compulsory purchase order on the pier. In November 2021, it was announced that CNM Estates had agreed to sell the pier to the council. The council bought the pier in July 2023, with the intention of repairing and restoring it, allowing the lifeboat station to relocate back to Birnbeck Island.

Architects and engineers were appointed in September 2023. Restoration work was planned to be carried out in phases between 2024 and 2027 and was to be funded by the Royal National Lifeboat Institution (RNLI), the government's levelling-up fund, the National Heritage Memorial Fund, Historic England and the National Lottery Heritage Fund. The RNLI withdrew from the project in June 2025 due to concerns over funding. A planning application for the first phase (repairs and alterations to buildings at the landward end) was submitted in April 2024, and work had started on the island by October 2024.

In early September 2025, the council announced that the restoration attempt had failed following the RNLI’s withdrawal, stating that no further work would resume for the foreseeable future. However, on 16 September 2025, it was announced that the council had secured an additional £5.54 million from the National Lottery Heritage Fund, adding to the £10 million previously awarded in October 2024. This brought the total external funding for the project to over £20 million. At the same meeting, councillors voted to award the contract for the restoration of the pier structure to Mackley, a specialist marine and heritage contractor. Work on the pier structure is scheduled to begin by the end of 2025 and is expected to be completed by late 2026.

== Weston Lifeboat Station ==
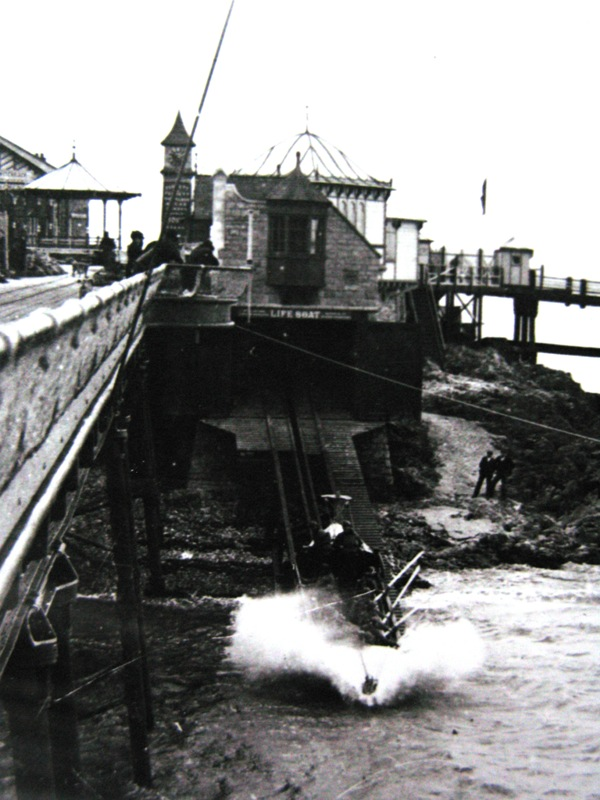
The William James Holt launches from the boat house used between 1889 and 1902.

Due to the extreme tidal range in the Bristol Channel, finding a suitable launching site for lifeboats proved an arduous task for the Royal National Lifeboat Institution (RNLI). Davits were installed on the pier in 1882, enabling a lifeboat to be lowered into the water below, even at low tide. A new, larger lifeboat was stationed here in 1889 and a boathouse was built for it on the north-east side of the island with a 100 feet (30 m) slipway beside the pier. This facility was replaced in 1902 when a new boathouse was built on the south-east side of the island. This had a 368 feet (112 m) slipway which enabled the lifeboat to be launched at most states of the tide and was the longest in England.

The slipway was closed in 2007 due to its poor condition, after that the lifeboats have been launched from the north-east side of the island. The crews continued to use the 1889 boathouse but the two inshore lifeboats were kept on their launch trolleys in the open air on Birnbeck Island. In April 2011 a new "temporary" boathouse was erected to give them cover. The structure cost £70,000 but was designed so that it could be dismantled when no longer needed at Birnbeck and moved to be reused elsewhere. In 2015 the RNLI announced that it would seek planning permission for a permanent lifeboat station at Knightstone Harbour along with deep-water anchorage at Anchor Head and the facilities on Birnbeck Pier were closed.

Weston-super-Mare is the busiest RNLI station on the south side of the Bristol Channel; in 2011 its two lifeboats were called out 42 times. Historically, the largest number of people rescued at one time was on 22 September 1884 when 40 passengers were taken off the SS Welsh Prince which got into difficulties after leaving the pier.

== Cultural references ==
Find the Lady, an episode of the 1979 BBC Shoestring detective series, was filmed on Birnbeck Pier and other locations around Weston. Guest stars for the episode were Toyah Willcox and Christopher Biggins.

== See also ==
- List of piers
