= Sand Bay =

Bay in Somerset, England

Coordinates: 51°23′N 2°58′W

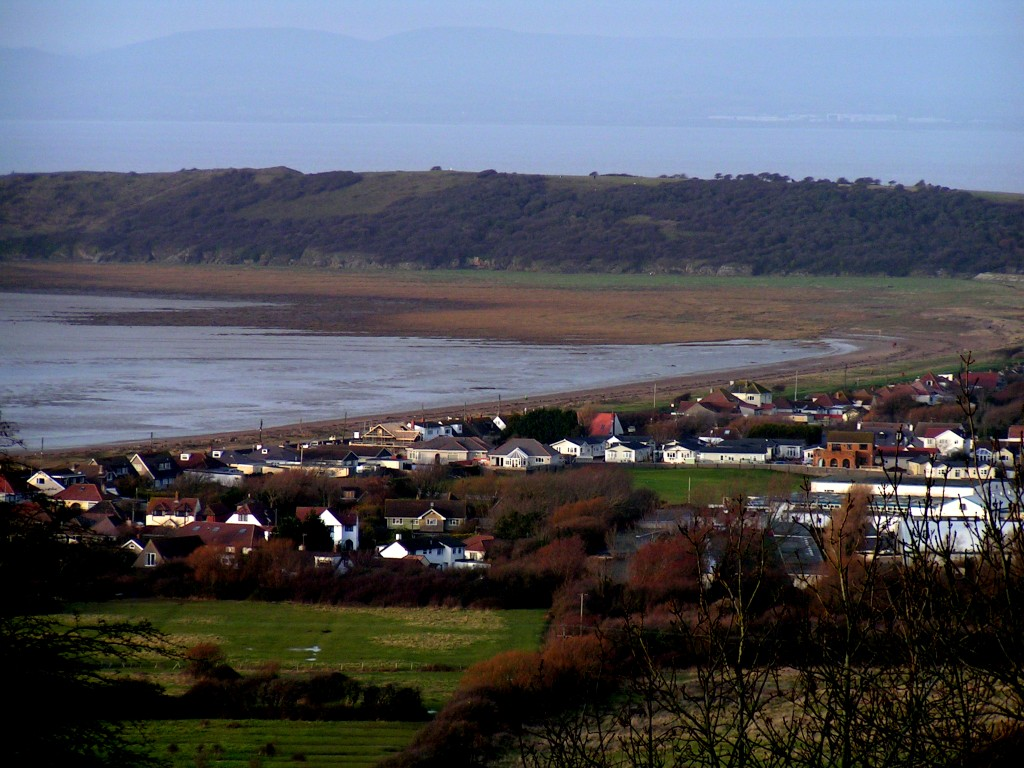
Sand Bay looking north from Monk's steps. Spartina grass can be seen at the north of the beach. Sand Point and Middle Hope is in the background and South Wales in the far distance across the water.

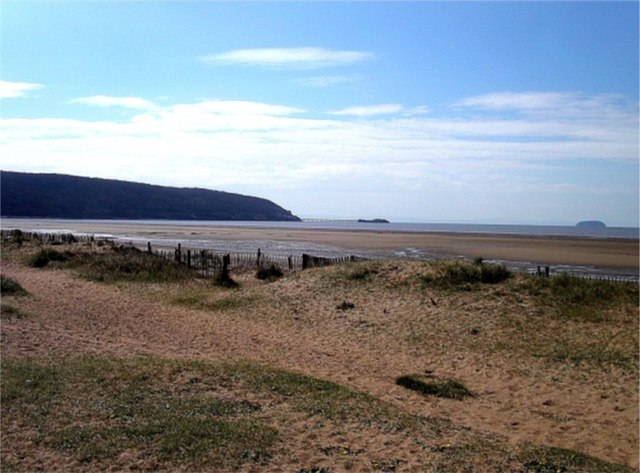
Dunes above the beach at Sand Bay. Birnbeck Island and the island of Steep Holm can be seen on the horizon.

Sand Bay is a strip of coast in North Somerset bordered to the south by Worlebury Hill and to the north by Sand Point and Middle Hope. It lies 2 miles (3.2 km) north of the seaside resort of Weston-super-Mare, and across the Bristol Channel from South Wales. It is adjacent to the village of Kewstoke.

== Coastal details ==
The north end of Sand Bay has become overgrown with spartina grass since the 1950s. This hardy grass was planted to support the banks of a tributary to the Bristol Channel further upstream than Sand Bay. Over the last 20 years the grass has rapidly taken over the north end of the beach and is now beginning to grow in isolated areas of the south end. The grass also began to grow on the beach at Weston-super-Mare, but was removed by the local council.

In the 1980s, part of the beach at Sand Bay was raised to prevent flooding by pumping sand from the Bristol Channel up onto the beach. The beach now has two levels, one at the original height near the sea and one bordering the adjacent road at the higher level. The upper beach level has now become covered in grass in many areas (not with the spartina grass – which is found at sea level).

== Sea water quality ==
The beach is often littered with tidal-borne material that washes up from the Bristol Channel, and—like all other beaches in North Somerset—it has never received a European Blue Flag. However, since 2005 and 2006 DEFRA has rated the water quality as good.

The Marine Conservation Society has 'adopted' the beach and since 1999 has carried out four surveys of the beach annually. A 2004 survey reported that the beach had three times the national average quantity of sewage-related debris, with particularly high numbers of cotton bud sticks.

== Holiday destination ==
A Pontins holiday camp was opened in Sand Bay in 1947, remaining with the company until 1999. During its peak of popularity it had 300 chalets spread over 17 acres (6.9 ha). After Pontins, the site was owned by the Holybush Hotel group under the name of Sand Bay Holiday Village. With cabaret, tea dances, comedy and music, it remains a popular destination. In 2008, The company has rebranded to Martyn Leisure Breaks and is now known as Sand Bay Leisure Resort. In 2013, Martyn Leisure Breaks entered administration and closed the park. In 2014, it was announced that the site would re-open for the 2014 as a Pontins resort once again, now under the ownership of Britannia Hotels.

There are several static caravan parks in the Sand Bay / Kewstoke area. Although mainly a holiday destination Sand Bay does also have housing and a population of people who live in the village. Sand Bay has a Bar/Fish and Chip shop, Tea Rooms and a Snack bar with Public Toilets and two Car Parks. First West of England route 1 operates between Sand Bay and Weston-Super-Mare town centre, using open-top buses weather permitting, all year round.
