= Albion Lowlander =

Scottish-built low-height double-decker bus

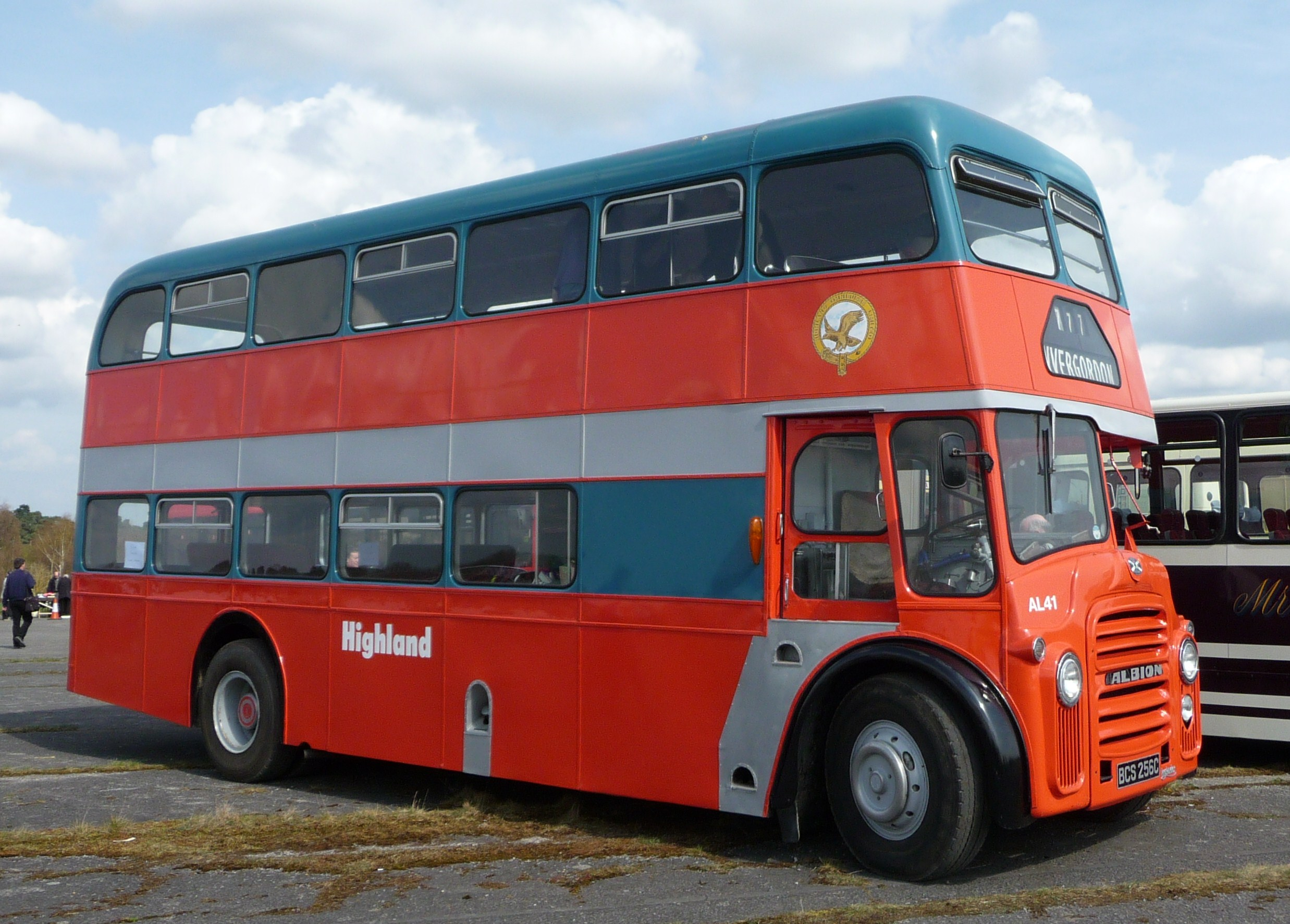
- A 1965 Lowlander LR7, new to Western SMT, preserved in the colours of second owner Highland Omnibuses Ltd.

Overview
- Manufacturer: Leyland Motors; Albion Motors

Body and chassis
- Doors: 1 door just aft of front nearside wheel-arch, air operated, either four leaf folding or single piece sliding
- Floor type: Step-free entrance, sunken lower-deck gangway

Powertrain
- Engine: Leyland O.600 ‘Power Plus’ 9.8-litre 6-cylinder vertical four-stroke direct injection diesel engine, 140bhp
- Transmission: Single plate clutch and Leyland part-synchromesh 4-speed (LR3, 7) fluid coupling and Leyland Pneumocyclic semi-automatic 4-speed (LR1)

Dimensions
- Length: 30 ft (9.1 m); Sixteen built to shorter 28 ft 6 in (8.69 m) length with reduced rear overhang
- Width: 8 ft 0 in (2.44 m)
- Height: 13 ft 6 in (4.11 m)
- Curb weight: 8 tons with body (nominal); 14 tons (UK maximum) (GVW)

The Albion Lowlander was a Scottish-built low-height double-decker bus.

== Origins ==
During 1960 the Scottish Bus Group faced Leyland Motors (which had absorbed Albion Motors in 1951) with a dilemma. They had bought around 180 double-decker buses a year over the past decade, from 1955 onward these had been mainly and then (post-1957) exclusively either Leyland Titans with lowbridge bodies or Bristol Lodekkas. Despite Leyland Motors promoting the Atlantean with very attractive discounts, the SBG refused it outright. They wanted Leyland to build a double-decker bus to an equivalent layout to the Lodekka FLF6G, with a low overall height and central gangways for the length of both decks, a front engine and an entrance just aft of the front wheel arch, Leyland's reported £150 per bus discount on PDR1/1 Atlanteans would have made these chassis £100 cheaper than the bus SBG bought in quantity, but the low-height PDR1/1 had four rows of seats to the rear upstairs in four-in a row seating with a nearside sunken gangway. SBG was yet to work rear-engined buses but were against the idea.

Faced with the prospect of losing the SBG business to competitors AEC, Daimler or Guy, Leyland commissioned Albion Motors to develop a low-height front-engined double-decker bus using Leyland units, most of which already in production, the frame design was new as was the drop-centre rear axle but every other unit was made from production Leyland Motors parts. After the first four chassis were built at Scotstoun and development work was completed, the rest were assembled at Scotstoun from parts produced at Leyland.

== Mechanical features ==
Four variants were coded and three produced, all had an 18 feet 6 inches (5.64 m) wheelbase for a nominal bodied length of 30 feet (9.1 m), with width of 8 feet (2.4 m) and a height of 13 feet 6 inches (4.11 m) unladen. LR1 had a fluid coupling behind the engine and in front of the step-down gearbox, which joined to a drive shaft under the entry step, whilst on the nearside, aft of the front-entrance position, a four-speed Pneumocyclic semi-automatic transmission was fitted with drive then continued alongside the nearside frame-member to the driving head of the axle. The LR3 had a single-plate clutch and a four-speed manual gearbox with synchromesh on third and top. Both of these had rear semi-elliptic leaf springs; whilst the LR7 was as the LR3, but with rear air suspension designed to provide a constant height (nearly two inches (5 cm) lower than the unladen height of the steel-sprung examples) regardless of loading, an equivalent model with semi-automatic transmission and air suspension was coded LR5 but none were ordered. Albion gave all its forward-control models odd model numbers: no one was proposing a bonnet-type double decker in the UK in 1961.

All Lowlanders featured a ‘Power-Plus’ version of the Leyland O.600 diesel engine rated at 140 bhp at the same 2,000 rpm limit as the Titan's 125 bhp; the Lowlander also featured as standard a dual-circuit air brake system, which latter did not appear on the Titan until 1968. However, from the front of the "St. Helen’s-style" glass-reinforced plastic bonnet assembly, to the aft spring-hanger for the front axle, the bus was closely derived from the Titan PD3A, with the driving position only marginally lower. The frame design allowed a step-less front entrance and a central sunken gangway on the lower deck: all lower saloon seats were on a higher level than the gangway to allow the transmission, fuel tanks and other ancillaries such as brake chambers and batteries to be sited. The cross-members, like the side-frames, were of complex shapes, a mixture of tubular, box-section and I-beam members being employed. Like the Lodekka FLF, bodywork was to be cantilevered from the frame aft of the rear axle. An unusual facet of the design, adapted to take steel-framed bodies from any open-market UK coachbuilder, was twin fuel tanks, offside mounted between third and fourth and fourth and fifth cross-members, and linked by a balance–pipe, with the fuel-filler attached to the forward tank. During the development programme Sir Henry Spurrier, chairman at the time of both Leyland Motors and Albion Motors, drove one of the prototypes and asked for a more progressive brake action.

== Customers ==
Total production from 1961 to 1967 was 274. One, 747 EUS (third chassis built and hence in Albion's alphanumeric ten-vehicle chassis numbering 62100C), was the second LR1 and Albion Motors’ demonstrator. The fourth chassis (62100D) which was the first LR7, was bought by Edinburgh Corporation in 1962 and stored until 1964 when it was sold via Albion to Western SMT who placed an order with Northern Counties to body it with their last batch of Lowlanders and it was thus delivered in 1965. Western took the two other Albion-constructed chassis (62100A and B); the first (LR1) as their TCS 151 (shown at the Glasgow Kelvin Hall Motor Show in 1961) and the second, UCS 659, which was the first LR3. Including these and the chassis bought from Edinburgh, Western were the largest Lowlander Customer taking 111 in total, second largest was Alexander (Midland) who had 44; 30 went to Central SMT, East Midland Motor Services based in Chesterfield took 18 and Luton Corporation and Ribble Motor Services both took 16, there were fourteen for Yorkshire Woollen District Traction Company, ten for Southend Corporation, seven for Alexander (Fife), five for the South Notts Bus Company and two for Alexander (Northern). Fifteen Lowlanders were ordered in 1962, but later cancelled, by Walsall Corporation.

All Lowlanders for English operators were badged as Leylands, except for the very last one built, and all those for Scottish operators were badged as Albions. Two brochures were produced, both featuring artwork of Alexander's mock-up body on the cover and a Lowlander grille badge where the Leyland or Albion badges went on production bodies. That said, East Midland's D162 (162 NVO) appeared at the 1962 Earl's Court Commercial Motor Show with an Albion grille badge, Leyland had previously frowned on the use of badge-engineering to gain stand space at shows, a practice used by arch rivals AEC during the 1950s; however the East Midland bus was on the Walter Alexander Coachbuilders stand.

Also, after 747 EUS had finished demonstrating, it entered service with the Preston-area independent Bamber Bridge Motor Services and retained its Albion Grille badge. During its demonstration, it spent long spells on loan to Glasgow Corporation Transport (fully one year) and Edinburgh Corporation Transport. Neither were likely customers for the Lowlander, having bought high-capacity single deckers (respectively 30 Leyland Royal Tiger Worldmaster and 100 Leyland Tiger Cub) from 1956 to 1961 for their height-restricted routes. Glasgow had previously announced a large order for Atlanteans and Edinburgh were mainly committed to Titans, but dithering between body layouts, lengths and braking systems. It is interesting that Edinburgh ordered an example, but perhaps it was not bodied because any coachbuilder would have had trouble providing adequate nearside visibility for the driver had it been fitted with the Leyland/BMMO full-width bonnet assembly standard at Edinburgh. With a full complement of badges a Lowlander, regardless to whom it was delivered, would have carried an enamelled Albion saltire shield on the flap concealing the radiator filler, either Leyland or Albion in stylised chrome-plated lettering across the fourth slat down on the radiator grille and a Lowlander badge in chrome finish and Leyland–style script, on the nearside at the foot of the grille panel, just by the nearside end of the registration number plate.

== Coachbuilders ==
The Scottish Bus Group had mainly dual-sourced the bodies on their Leyland Titan PD2 and PD3 from Northern Counties Motor and Engineering Company of Wigan and Walter Alexander Coachbuilders of Falkirk and it was these two who would provide the bodies for SBG's Lowlanders. Western and Central took both firms' products whilst the Alexander companies took Alexander bodywork (the bus operations of Walter Alexander & Sons had been separated from the vehicle building activities prior to the nationalisation of the SMT group's bus operations to avoid the sales restrictions that afflicted Bristol Commercial Vehicles and Eastern Coach Works from 1948). Alexander also bodied the Southend batch, East Midland's first fourteen and both batches for Ribble: these were notable as the only Lowlanders to have fully fronted bodies, the GRP bonnet assembly built into the body and disguised at the front with a similar grille (with a Ribble legend rather than the badges of Leyland or Albion) to the fully fronted Titans Ribble had taken from 1958 to 1963. Access to the engine cover for maintenance was provided by a hinged door of the same shape as the driver's door, but with an additional kerb-viewing window. Only Ribble took Alexander bodies with hinged driver's doors, SBG, East Midland and Southend Corporation used inward-sliding driver's doors, as also used by Northern Counties and Metro Cammell Weymann.

The other Northern Counties-bodied Lowlanders were those supplied to the South Notts Bus Company of Gotham, Nottinghamshire, who purchased one a year from 1963 to 1967. South Notts was since 1929 half-owned by the Dabell family and half by major independent bus & coach operator Barton Transport Ltd; Barton had taken Northern Counties bodies on its double deckers since 1957 and in 1960 South Notts had a Northern Counties lowbridge forward-entrance Titan PD3, similar to Barton's contemporary AEC Regents but without the full front and ‘wrap around’ curved windscreens and upper deck windows. Like this and contemporary Barton double deckers, the South Notts Lowlanders had a sliding, air-operated, single-piece entry door; the SBG's Lowlanders all had folding four-leaf doors to the entrance.

At the beginning of 1962 Dennis Brothers Ltd had announced that no further Dennis Loline orders would be accepted; the decision was rescinded later in the year but it cost Dennis a number of orders, among existing Loline customers perturbed by this was Luton Corporation. As a major railway junction with many prosperous employers in the area, including Vauxhall and Commer they had a requirement for double-deck buses able to get under low bridges and had begun to replace their early post-war Crossley DD42s, for which there were no new spare parts being made, with Leyland O.600-powered Lolines, two short wheelbase examples were delivered in 1960 and had 63 seat bodies by East Lancashire Coachbuilders of Blackburn. Thus Luton, looking for an O.600-powered lowheight double-decker placed an order for sixteen LR7 Lowlanders, these were the same 28 ft 10in length as the previous Lolines but as Leyland did not offer a choice of wheelbase, they had 65-seat East Lancashire bodies (10) or bodies on East Lancs frames finished by their associate in the John Brown Engineering group, Neepsend Coachworks of Sheffield (6). These featured a short tail and were delivered from June–December 1963 in ones and twos. The first six examples took registrations 165-70EMJ booked for Lolines Luton were forced to cancel.

It was 1964 when the fifth coachbuilder bodied a Lowlander, this was Weymann (1928) Ltd of Addlestone, Surrey, who were part of the Metro-Cammell Weymann sales organisation in partnership with Metro-Cammell of Birmingham, MCW had a strong relationship with the British Electric Traction group and did not like the sales incursions by Walter Alexander into their patch, so they offered a better tender price for bodies on Lowlanders for Yorkshire Woollen District Traction Company Ltd, based in the West Riding town of Dewsbury. These became YWD's 926-39 (KHD400-13) and were the first and last Weymann-bodied Lowlanders as following prolonged industrial action and a fire at the factory, Metro-Cammell's owners Laird Group bought out the Weymann shareholders and closed down the Surrey facility. Subsequently, Metro-Cammell built East Midland Motor Services' last four Lowlanders to a similar outline in 1966, these were D183-6 (GNN183-6D): only one more Lowlander was built, the last for South Notts. Walsall's abortive order was also to have been bodied by the MCW group.

== In service ==
To start with, all but tall drivers liked the Lowlander, because it was more powerful than the buses it replaced and unlike the vacuum-braked Titan, stopping within a safe distance was a certainty rather than a hope. For conductors, although it was better than a side-gangway design, it was worse than the contemporary flat-floor Lodekka as the passenger gangway on the lower deck was narrow and deeply sunken, with odd excrescences to catch unpractised feet: also unlike the Eastern Coach Works body designed to integrate with the FLF there was not an easy refuge area to stand in to allow passengers on and off at stops.

For mechanics, especially those brought up on the Titan, it was a curse, sometimes even inspiring them to violence: every part was hard to get to, and much dismantling of coachwork was necessary even for routine servicing of some components. As time went by, management discovered brake and gearbox wear figures were much worse than on Titans and although bodied weight was about identical, fuel consumption was also worse, these weaknesses were particularly prominent on the LR1 variant which was chosen for most SBG orders; it was the first semi-automatic bus they had bought and not only was it less tolerant of driver abuse, drivers also had to get used to the fact that there was no longer the engine-braking effect available with a "solid" transmission. The Alexander body also had problems, the prototypes used a standard Alexander upper-deck structure with a deeply-domed roof and low-set windows as on Glasgow Titans and AEC Regent Vs and recent Dennis Lolines for Aldershot & District Traction Company and North Western Road Car Company; this left no space for most operators' standard front destination displays, and required both pairs of front upper-deck seats to be mounted on raised platforms; All Lowlanders had the offside front seats above the cab raised to give the driver a modicum of headroom. UCS659 and subsequent Alexander bodies had a modified design with a lower floor line to the nearside over the engine and the front upper deck windows mounted at a higher level than those at the sides of the body. Ribble Motor Services, the third owner of demonstrator 747EUS, rebuilt it to a similar layout, although it retained its half-cab and Albion badge. TCS151 remained in original condition until the end of its service with Highland.

All forward entrance half-cab buses had structural weaknesses and these showed up on most Lowlanders, panel drumming, entry-doors sticking, stanchions rattling – sometimes even falling out, rainwater ingress causing electrical faults with the lights and bells and larger roof leaks particularly from the joint aft of the front dome all being symptoms. Central and Western started replacing their Lowlanders after three years in service, these being transferred to Alexander (Fife), Alexander (Northern) and Highland Omnibuses. By 1967 Central had no Lowlanders and by 1974 Highland operated more of the type than anybody else.

Southend faced the body structure and engineering weaknesses by using the type increasingly on peak-hour duplication, rail-replacement work and lightly loaded runs into rural Thames-side territory notably route 4B to Great Wakering and route 18 to Ministry of Defence -controlled Foulness Island; for this purpose Southend uniquely fitted their Lowlanders by 1970 for driver-only operation, for which the driver had to turn to the left inside the cab to collect fares.

Luton Corporation, like Central SMT, found its mechanics constantly leaving for better paid and more congenial work elsewhere, and prior to selling out to United Counties Omnibus Company in 1970 the fleet had an increasingly shabby and neglected appearance; neglect made Luton's Lowlanders' rear air-suspension a particular cause of trouble, which in turn led to chassis-frame and coachwork problems. The first to be withdrawn was 169 (169EMJ) in July 1970; it was gradually dismantled over the next two years. With the New Bus Grant (and cascaded Bristol Lodekkas) enabling accelerated replacement and United Counties having inherited few spare parts from Luton Corporation the rest of the former Luton Corporation Lowlanders left Luton by October 1972. 171HTM was also dismantled by UCOC between November 1972 and March 1973. UCOC did convert some of the Luton Lowlanders to either rear steel-coil suspension or rear steel-leaf (in effect converting them to LR3's). The last former Luton Lowlanders ran for United Counties by January 1974. In the secondhand market the mechanically fit examples were widely dispersed, including one passing to Highland Omnibuses. Two were in the fleet of Godfrey Abbott Group Coaches of Sale, Greater Manchester when it was purchased by Greater Manchester Passenger Transport Executive, these were the only Lowlanders ever to be owned by a PTE. Swiftly sold on by this standardisation-minded operator 165EMJ went to Crawford of Neilston and then Silver Fox Coaches of Glasgow who withdrew it in 1980. Luton 177 (177HTM) was the last of this unloved cohort to survive, being withdrawn by Avro Coaches of Romford Essex in August 1982.

East Midland, on the other hand, chose manual Lowlanders (having previously bought lowbridge Atlanteans) because the engine-braking available suited some of their hillier routes in the Peak District, notably route 4 (Chesterfield-Doncaster) and route 17 (Chesterfield-Matlock) and the only modifications over a full service life of around 15 years were the removal of illuminated advertising displays from the first batch and the panelling over of the lower set of apertures in the radiator grille, as the engine was originally over-cooled in the upland climate in which their examples operated. After the fleet merged with Mansfield District, one was transferred there but was not popular because of its lack of cab headroom and heavy controls. It was even sent to Lincolnshire Road Car's Scunthorpe depot when they had a vehicle shortage, but it was swiftly returned to Mansfield.

Yorkshire Woollen were fond of their Lowlanders, although drivers nicknamed them "Scrum-Half" buses, the point being that they were best driven by small drivers with long arms. Although the Lowlander was a specialist low height bus they were used fairly indiscriminately, often turn and turnabout with Leyland Titan PD3s.

The Alexander companies got on with their Lowlanders, and Midland, in particular, may have felt a sense of obligation, as many of their services distributed Albion workers to Clydebank and Glasgow's northern and north-eastern suburbs from a stand on Scotstoun's Dumbarton Road. Highland made good use of their cascaded fleet of Lowlanders, mainly on scholars’ contracts and work involved in the Dounreay Fast-Breeder Nuclear Reactor complex. Their AL45 was new to Luton as its 166 (166EMJ).

== In retrospect ==
The Lowlander was a type Leyland did not really want to build and it never attained the sales forecast for it, which should have reached over 450 rather than 274 by 1967. By 1966 SBG had decided that they could live with a rear–engined double decker in the form of the Daimler Fleetline, taking 640 from 1963 to 1980. Aside from the over-produced frame components (most of those not newly built into chassis went for scrap, although Luton had to take some side-members as spares because neglect of the rear suspension on some of their buses caused frame-cracking) the only unique assembly was the rear axle, and with some revisions to the layout of components that became a key part of the low-height Atlanteans, types PDR1/2 and PDR1/3 built from 1964 to 1971. The Lowlander was the last Albion-designed double-decker, and the penultimate Albion design of bus for UK operation.

Albion, as Albion Automotive, a specialist in axle assemblies and other automotive components, continue to manufacture in part of the Scotstoun site they first occupied in 1901. Leyland and the Scottish Bus Group have both vanished due to political decisions about which industries should be Government-supported. Ten Lowlanders are preserved whilst some survive outside the UK on tourist or publicity work. Britbus make a 1:76 scale model of the Alexander-bodied version.
