= South Notts Bus Company =

Bus company in Nottinghamshire

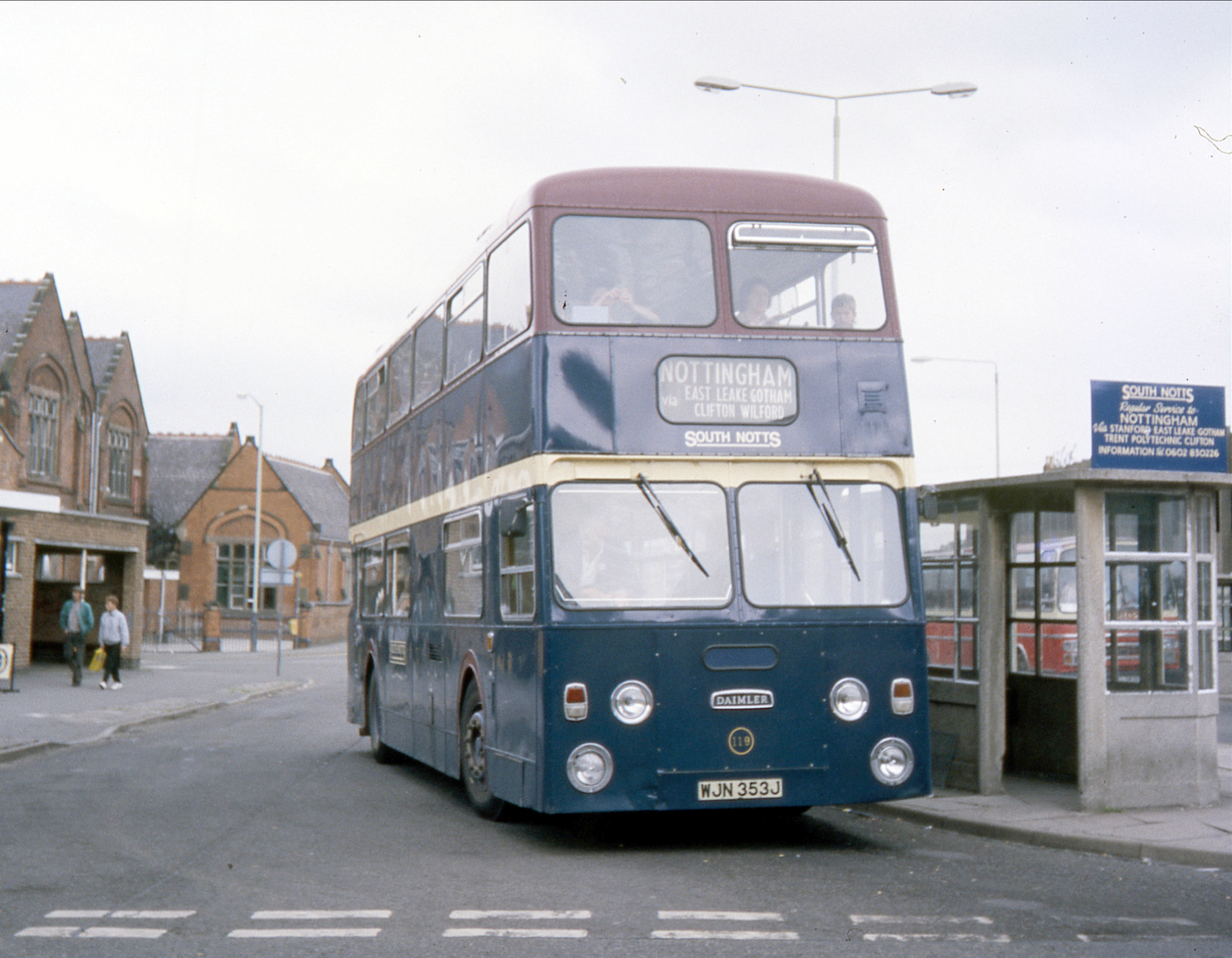
- Northern Counties bodied Daimler Fleetline in Loughborough in 1989
- Parent: Arthur Dabell (50%); Barton Transport (50%)
- Founded: March 13, 1926; 100 years ago
- Ceased operation: March 13, 1991; 35 years ago
- Headquarters: Gotham
- Service area: Nottinghamshire
- Service type: Bus operator

South Notts Bus Company was a bus company operating in Nottinghamshire from 1926 until 1991 when the company was sold to Nottingham City Transport, who continue to use the brand name today.

== History ==
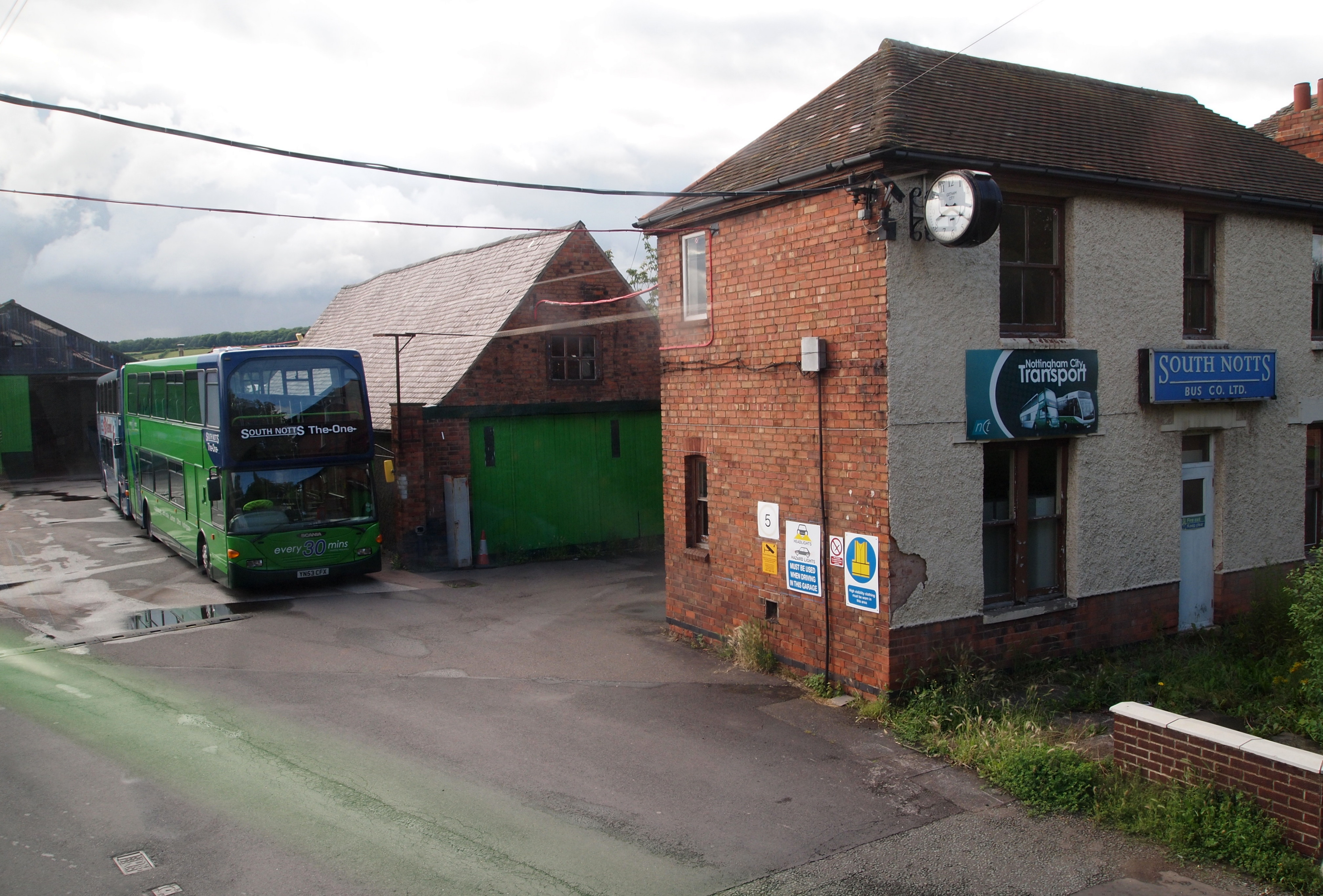
The former South Notts depot in Gotham when in use with Nottingham City Transport in July 2012

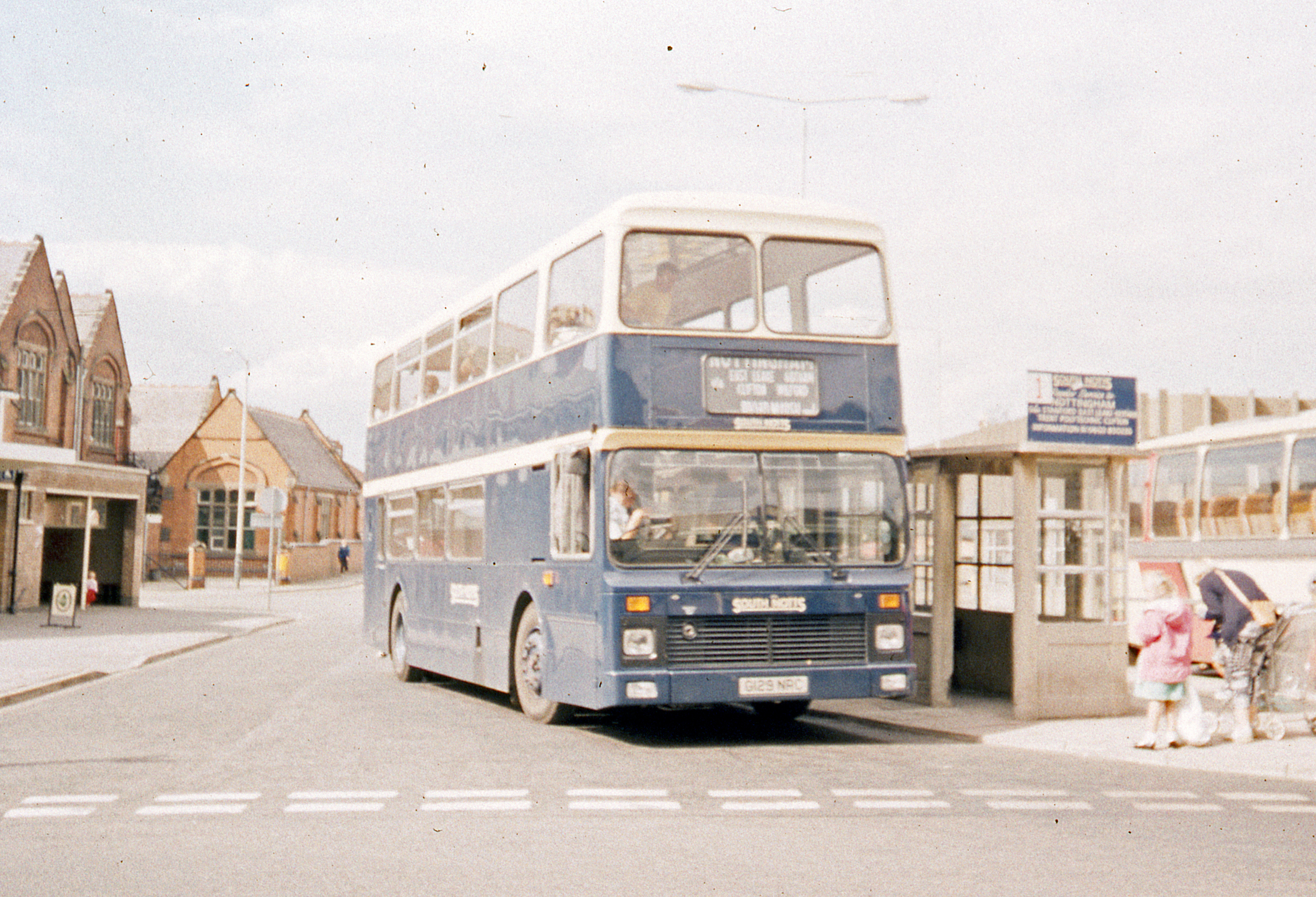
Northern Counties bodied Leyland Olympian in Loughborough

In March 1926, Christopher Dabell commenced operating a service between Gotham and Nottingham with a 20-seat Guy BB based at a depot on Leake Road in Gotham. Barton Transport already provided a bus service on this route but Dabell gained enough local customers to make his service successful. In 1929, an agreement was made with Barton Transport which involved Barton acquiring a 50% share of South Notts whilst withdrawing from the South Notts route. The South Notts service was extended to Loughborough, and this continued to be the company's main route until its takeover.

Single-deck buses, mainly Guys, joined the fleet until 1932, when Leylands started to arrive, followed by Gilfords, Bedfords and Dennises. The first double-decker did not arrive until 1951, when an ex Hants & Dorset Leyland Titan was acquired. This proved useful on services to the new Clifton Estate, which were provided jointly with Nottingham City Transport and West Bridgford UDC. More followed, with the fleet size increasing rapidly to meet the new demand, and it was not long before the fleet became predominantly double-deck. However, a small coach fleet was also maintained, for which Bedfords were the preferred vehicles until the mid-1980s when the Bedfords were supplanted by secondhand Leyland Leopards.

The double-deck fleet was of lowbridge or lowheight types, due to the height of the bridge where the Great Central Railway crossed Wilford Lane. By the early 1960s these were sunken gangway Leyland PD3s, with either Metro Cammell or Northern Counties bodies, later Albion Lowlanders again with Northern Counties bodies, which negated the sunken gangway requirement. after the Lowlander ceased production, Leyland Atlantean PDR1/3s with Northern Counties bodies were purchased. However, when this bridge was removed, South Notts continued to buy lowheight Leyland Atlantean PDR1/3s and Daimler Fleetlines with either Northern Counties or Eastern Coach Works bodies.

On 13 March 1991, following £32,000 (equivalent to £70,000 in 2023) in losses due to sustained competition from rival independent Kinchline, South Notts was sold to Nottingham City Transport (NCT), with the operator maintaining South Notts as a subsidiary brand. East Lancs bodied Leyland Olympian and Volvo Olympians were added to the fleet to oust the remaining Atlanteans and Fleetlines. Newer Olympians did operate the main service, now numbered 1. Since 21 September 2009 the route has been branded as South Notts The One. Scania OmniDekkas cascaded from Clifton service 48, were re-liveried, replacing the last Volvo Olympians, making the fleet fully low floor. Nottingham City Transport have also transferred the operation of other routes, not traditionally associated with South Notts, to Gotham garage. A number of Scania single-deckers, articulated buses, and double-deckers were allocated to the depot to operate these services.

On 27 March 2021, South Notts' former depot in Gotham depot was closed by Nottingham City Transport as part of efforts to cut costs following the COVID-19 pandemic, with operations moving to NCT's Parliament Street and Trent Bridge garages. The name of the company was retained as a route brand, with Gotham depot's clock, memorial benches, timeline and South Notts sign moving to Trent Bridge.

== Liveries ==
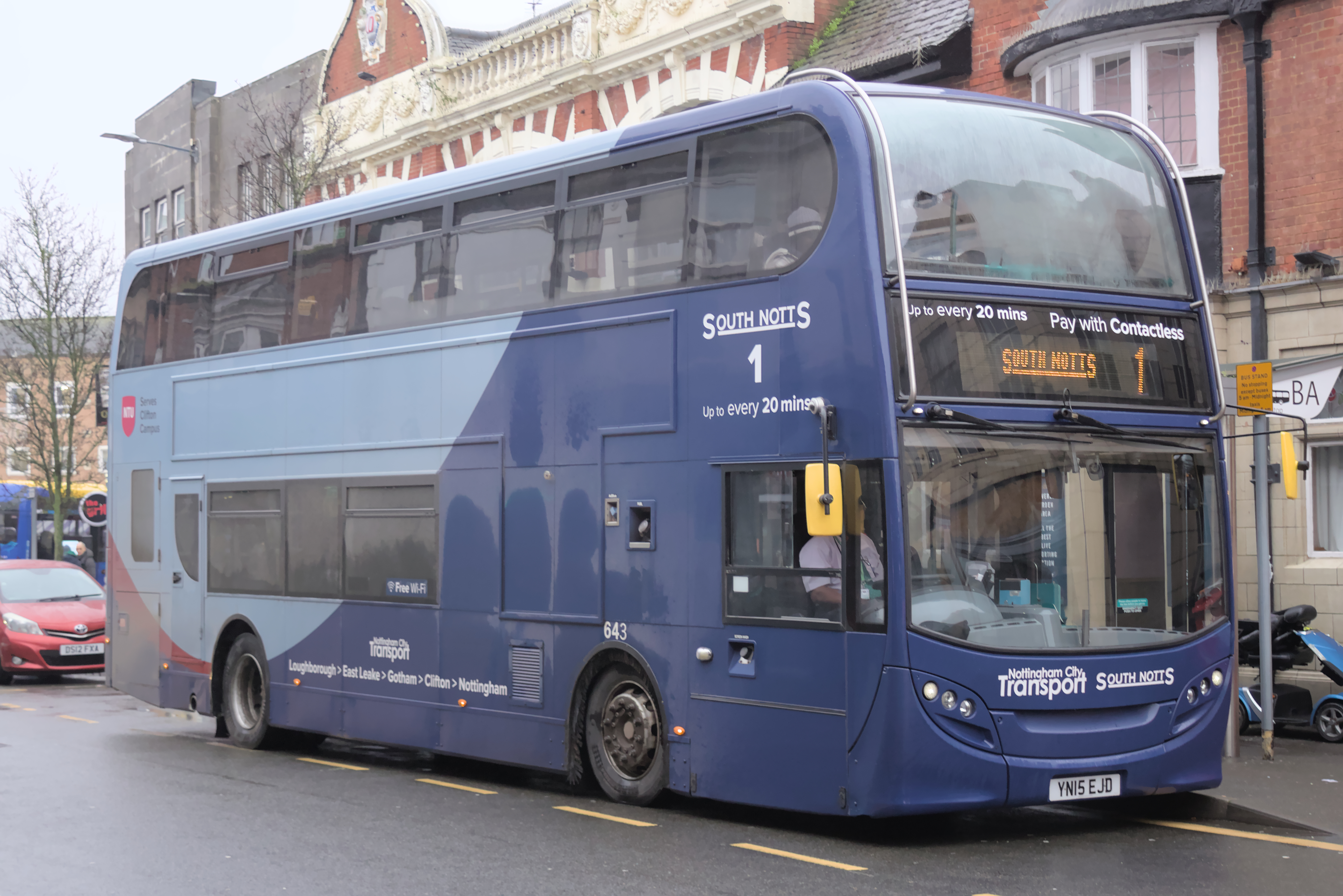
South Notts branded Nottingham City Transport Alexander Dennis Enviro400 bodied Scania N230UD in Loughborough

The original livery was dark blue and cream; maroon was later added. For much of the company's existence, the livery for double-deckers was dark blue with a cream relief band and a maroon roof, whilst coaches had a slightly different livery of two-tone blue and cream. To celebrate the 60th anniversary of the company in 1986, Leyland Fleetline 117 was repainted with a cream roof, as the original livery, as well as receiving special branding, and later the rest of the fleet also saw the maroon replaced with cream.

Following takeover, the blue and cream livery was retained, with the area of cream expanded, and variants were created for minibuses and single-deckers, the latter involving two shades of blue.

The livery was changed to NCT's two-tone green livery, with navy blue around the upper deck windscreen and front and rear sections of the roof. The South Notts fleetname was dropped in 2014. Coinciding with the introduction of new Alexander Dennis Enviro400 bodied Scania N230UD double deckers, on 1 April 2015, a new livery of navy front and rear with silver in between was introduced and the South Notts name reinstated.

To commemorate the 100th anniversary of the operator's commencement of services, on 13 March 2026 at 8:20 a.m., precisely the time the first South Notts service departed, Nottingham City Transport unveiled a Alexander Dennis Enviro400 bodied Scania N230UD painted in South Notts heritage livery for use on service 1.
