= Yellow Bus Services =

Bus company in England

Front and reverse views of a Yellow Bus Services ticket issued during World War II

The business of Yellow Bus Services (YBS) of Stoughton, Guildford was started in 1920 as a partnership between Mr Frank Hutchins (using a legacy from his uncle) and Mr Sydney Hayter (using his gratuity earned from service with the Royal Flying Corps. The partnership was to dissolve after 3 years, with Hayter remaining as the sole proprietor. Mr Hayter died in 1951 and the company ceased to trade as a bus operator in 1958, with its interests taken over by the Aldershot and District Traction Company.

== Between the wars ==
The first service, using a Ford Model T bus in brown and yellow livery, ran between the Royal Hotel, Stoughton and the Theatre Royal, Guildford, from January 1921. A very personal service, with extra trips run to pick up passengers who could not be accommodated in the small buses on the first run, led to success. Further bus chassis were bought, with YBS building the bodies themselves at their premises in Manor Road, with interior finishing by a local firm, J. Mussell and Son. A second service ran for a while between Guildford Park housing estate and the town centre, in competition with Aldershot and District Traction Company Ltd (A&D), and a Guildford to London service was run for a short period using a Chevrolet bus in a "Pullman" livery.

In 1924 the company expanded to four vehicles, a staff of seven, and larger premises in Worplesdon Road, which were further expanded in the 1930s with an impressive frontage added. A key figure in the company by this time was traffic manager Arthur Bowden, who also acted as signwriter, mechanic and handyman. By 1927, A&D were operating a high intensity Stoughton service with a flat fare of just one penny, with the clear intention of putting YBS out of business. The firm was at a low ebb but Hayter, fighting back in a "make or break" move, invested in 2 new Dennis 'G' buses for a route in 1928 from Guildford to Camberley, also in competition with A&D. That year a third Dennis bus enabled the start of a service from Guildford to Farnham via Compton, Puttenham and Seale. A third company, Safeguard was now competing for passengers in the same areas and, in 1928, the companies agreed a standard fares policy. By 1930, YBS had 5 modern Dennis buses in its fleet, to which two larger (32 seater) Dennis Lancet buses were added in 1933. Yellow Bus Services had weathered the storm. By 1935, the brand name "Yellow Bus Services" had been added to the vehicles and new Dennis Lancets delivered in 1936 carried a revised livery of creamy yellow with brown wings and flash, and bright yellow wheels. The fleet name now appeared in script within a hexagonal motif with the proprietor's name and telephone number, in gold and black.

In 1938, YBS produced an illustrated brochure, "A Yellow Bus Journey", extolling the beauty of the countryside between Guildford and Farnham and suggesting visits to the Watts Gallery and Watts Mortuary Chapel en route, or using the service as a stopping-off point for walks to Frensham Ponds, Crooksbury Hill, Waverley Abbey and other landmarks. This route alone, using 20 seat Dennis Pike buses, carried almost 25,000 passengers in just 3 months of that year.

== World War II ==
YBS shared their premises with the Auxiliary Fire Service (AFS) from the beginning of the war, and bus crews provided voluntary support to the full-time fire fighters. Other staff became ARP wardens or members of the Home Guard. Women were employed as conductresses for the first time, and loan of a Dennis Lancet to the Ministry of Supply (and its subsequent return in unserviceable condition) meant that YBS had to hire vehicles from other operators such as Tillingbourne Valley Services to cover for unserviceable buses, a situation which was eased by purchase of two Bedford vehicles from a company in Dover. YBS was the only operator in Guildford to comply with the government's request to bus operators to run 10% of their fleet on gas, two YBS buses pulling gas-producer trailers for a time. A bus on the Farnham to Guildford route had a "near-miss" when a bomb landed on the road shortly after the bus passed Shoelands, neare Seale. The increased number of passengers resulted in the buses having additional seats fitted and up to 30 standing passengers permitted. The first two of six Bedford "utility" buses were delivered to the company in 1942 and the buses were all repainted into wartime grey livery at this time. The last of the 6 utility vehicles was delivered in 1945 in cream livery and with upholstered seats. Following a renewed period of hostility with A&D, the two companies came to a further operating agreement (including joint operation of the Stoughton route) and also retimed the Farnham service to provide alternate buses via Cutmill.

== The post-war period ==
At the end of the war, the buses were quickly repainted in the cream livery (one having escaped being repainted in grey) and the utility buses upgraded. Loadings were heavy in the immediate post-war period but, in the 1950s, there was a general decline in use of buses, which had its effect on YBS. An increasing number of services were given dispensation for single person operation. Sunday morning services on the Farnham route were withdrawn in 1951. Sydney Hayter died suddenly at the age of 58 in November that year. In 1953 Yellow Bus Services was incorporated as a limited company, with Hayter's widow as the principal director. The South-east Traffic Commissioners granted an application for Yellow Bus Services Ltd to take over the service of buses previously run in the name of Yellow Bus Services by the late Mr Sydney Hayter. By then, only the Farnham and Camberley services remained, together with excursions from the Stoughton base. A&D were pressing YBS to sell their services to them and, in 1954 YBS surrendered their licence to run the Camberley service, allowing A&D a monopoly on that route. In an attempt to increase revenue by diversification YBS built a petrol station on their premises in 1955; this aspect of business expanded over the following years to include car repairs, tyre, battery and accessory sales, together with a paraffin delivery service. The service station was staffed by off-duty drivers and other staff displaced from bus services by the reduction in route miles.

== The end of the Yellow Bus ==
In 1957, A&D again approached YBS regarding sale of their business. Terms were agreed in which YBS would pass their routes, private hire business and goodwill to A&D, whilst retaining and expanding the garage business under the amended company name of Y.B.S. Ltd. The transfer took place in 1958, the final services under the Yellow Bus brand being on 15 June. The loss of the "friendly little yellow bus" from the Farnham road was subject of letters of regret in the local press, and several poems were written on the subject, now reproduced in "Happy Family - The Story of Yellow Bus Services, Stoughton". Drivers and conductors were offered jobs with Aldershot and District, and the services continued to run to the same timetables. Engineering staff were retained by YBS to work at the garage.

== A model employer ==
Sydney Hayter was a model employer. For example, he had planned to provide his staff with housing but finances had never become adequate for this; however, he would take groups of his staff to Littlehampton on their day off, take them fishing in his boat, take them for a meal and provide tickets for a variety show. Sometimes a group would accompany Sydney to a football match at Wembley. All dealings within the company were on first-name terms (unusual at that time) and passengers, too, were on first name terms with the crews. A club room was provided at the bus garage, fitted with a TV and sporting facilities, and regular social events were organised. An annual outing to the coast was organised for staff and families (on two weekends, so that all could attend). The staff were offered the opportunity to join a union but, having such a benevolent employer, none chose to do so. This resulted in an incident in 1957 during the national bus strike (through which YBS continued to operate) when a Yellow Bus en route from Farnham was "held-up" by 20 militant union members from the Aldershot and District company, who prevented the driver from continuing, and deflated his vehicle's tyres.

== The Runfold tragedy ==
The only serious accident to befall the company occurred on 2 September 1952 when the Farnham to Guildford service was involved in a collision with a lorry near the Princess Royal pub at Runfold. Three female passengers were killed and eight other people, including the conductor, were injured. The lorry was found to have defective steering and its driver was subsequently tried for manslaughter. The driver was found "not guilty", but was convicted on a lesser charge of dangerous driving for which he was banned from driving for 3 years and fined £15.

== The company's motto ==
"To provide a service cheerfully. Every day of the week. It's difficult but not impossible."

== Reference & further reading ==
- "Happy Family - The Story of Yellow Bus Services, Stoughton" (by N Hamshere and J Sutton) contains a fuller history of the company.
