= Topdeck =

Travel and holiday companies of the United Kingdom

- Founded: 1973
- Parent: Flight Centre

Topdeck Travel (originally Top Deck Travel) is a tour operator providing trips for people aged 18 to 35 throughout Europe, North America, Africa, Egypt, the Middle East, Australia, New Zealand, and Asia. Topdeck offers 330 different tours in 65 countries.

== History ==
=== Early days ===
The company was founded in 1973 and was officially named Argas Persicus Ltd, and it is trading as Topdeck Travel. The name was a reference to the turkey tick (Argas persicus), due to the founders having met in veterinary school. Transport was provided by Bristol K5 and Lodekka double-decker buses, converted to a camper-van layout where passengers slept in the bus. The first trip was to Spain and Morocco. From 1974 and right through the 1990s, these ‘deckers’ travelled Europe and further afield to the Middle East, and even overland between London and Kathmandu.

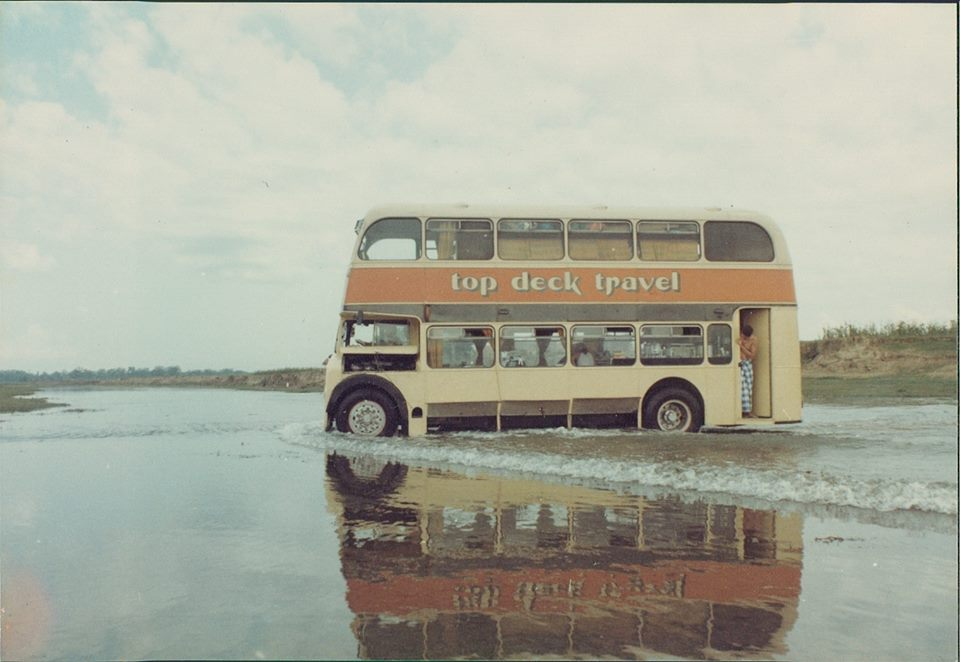
A Top Deck Travel bus crossing a creek in Northern India, 1983

In the early 1980s, the company expanded its operations into the United States, where it coined the name Decker Homes for its Bristol Lodekka buses. The company also ran trips from Sydney to London from 1980, with the final stretch using a converted Sydney double-decker. Coaches were introduced in the mid-1980s, primarily for winter ski holidays. The elderly Lodekkas, some over 40 years old, started to retire in the early 1990s in great numbers, many heading abroad for an active retirement, and the focus shifted to camping and hard-top trips staying in European campsites. Later, hotel adventure trips were introduced.

Today, former Top Deck Lodekkas can be seen all over the world, with examples in France, Italy, Netherlands, New Zealand and numerous other places. One former Southern Vectis example returned home, and is now on display at the Isle of Wight Bus & Coach Museum.

Topdeck, alongside Contiki Tours, is one of the few survivors of a period that saw several similar companies, such as Transit, Autotours and Sundowners, leave the business. The founders went on to set up Flight Centre, Australia's largest travel company.

=== Today ===
The company changed hands several times in the 1990s, and in 2003 was purchased by a consortium including Australian Pacific Touring and Connections Adventures.

In 2005, a substantial hotel programme was introduced creating a range of products for all budgets. In 2007, smaller group trips under the "Explorer" banner were launched.

Since then, the company has grown into a strong competitor to Contiki Tours in the competitive youth travel market. Its target markets include Australia, New Zealand, the United States and Canada, South Africa, and increasingly emerging markets such as Colombia, Mexico, Brazil, South Korea, and Singapore. Topdeck trips are primarily sold through budget and student travel outlets such as Flight Centre's youth brand Student Travel.

On 1 April 2010, Connections Adventures officially became Topdeck Australia. In Vietnam, Topdeck joined a venture with Buffalo Tours to operate tours in Vietnam, Lao, Cambodia and Thailand. Their longest tour is 27 days.

== Awards ==
In 2012, Topdeck won three awards at the TNT Golden Backpack Awards, taking home first place as Favourite Big Tour Operator, Favourite Tour Operator in West Europe, and Favourite Ski/Winter Operator.

== See also ==
- Belmond Limited
- Road Scholar
