= Dennis Loline =

British low-height double-decker bus

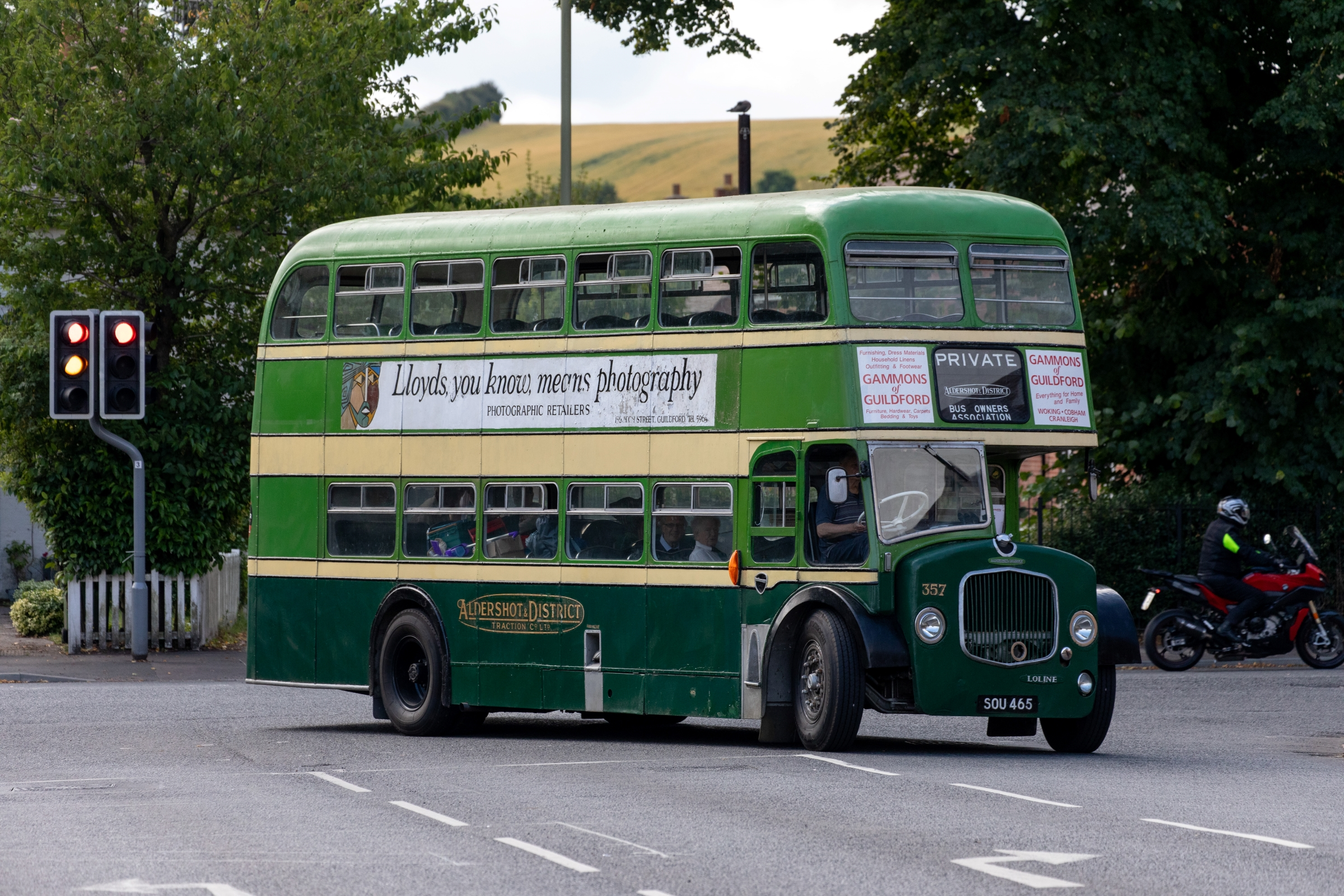
- Preserved Aldershot & District Traction East Lancashire Coachbuilders bodied Dennis Loline I in Alton in July 2024

Overview
- Manufacturer: Dennis
- Production: 1958–66
- Assembly: Guildford, England

Body and chassis
- Doors: 1
- Floor type: Step entrance
- Related: Bristol Lodekka

Powertrain
- Engine: AEC AV470; Leyland O.600; Gardner 6LW; Gardner 6LX

Dimensions
- Length: 8.5 m (27 ft 11 in) to 9.4 m (30 ft 10 in)
- Width: 2.4 m (7 ft 10 in)
- Height: 4.12 m (13 ft 6 in)

The Dennis Loline was a low-height double-decker bus manufactured by Dennis between 1958 and 1966.

== History ==
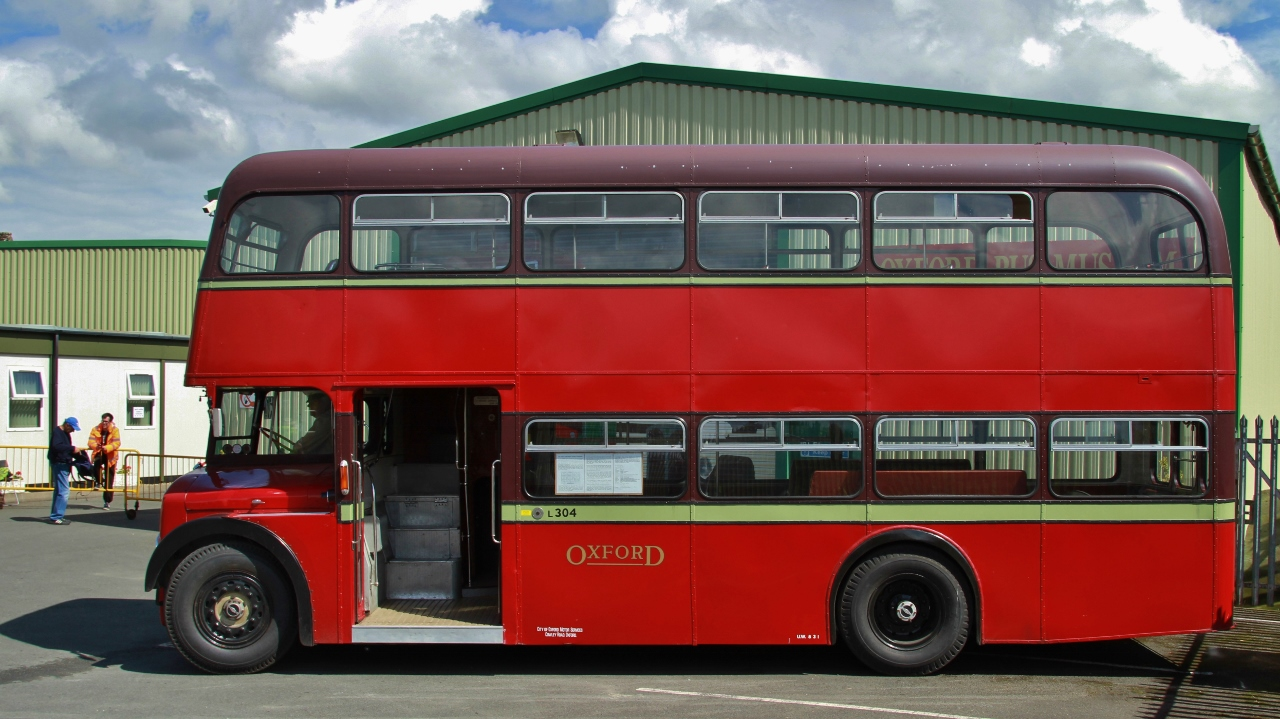
Preserved City of Oxford Motor Services Loline II

The Dennis Loline was basically a license-built Bristol Lodekka, being primarily supplied to municipal, private sector British Electric Traction fleets and independent bus companies in the United Kingdom, during a period when Bristol's sales were restricted to state-owned bus companies.

Production was to cease in 1962, however this was quickly reversed and it continued to be made until 1966.

Three versions of the Dennis Loline were built: the Loline with rear entrance, Loline II with front entrance and the later Loline III with a revised front grille in front of the radiator and a different clutch and constant mesh gearbox.

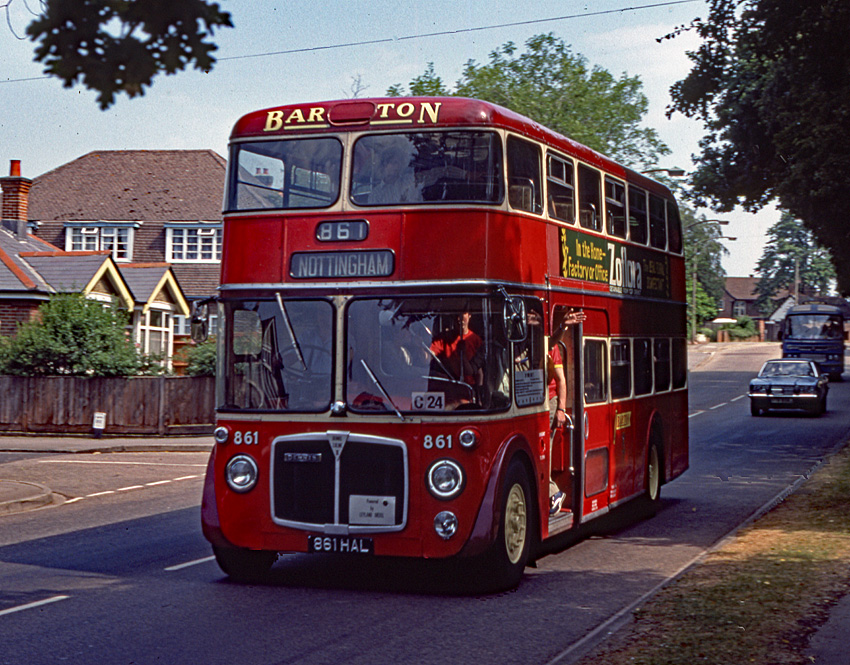
Barton's unique Dennis Loline II, 1984

In 1961, Barton Transport commissioned No. 861, which had lowbridge bodywork on a Loline chassis, and was the lowest ever roofed British double-decker. It was specially designed to pass under an ultra low railway bridge at Sawley Junction, now Long Eaton, station.

Aldershot & District Traction operated the largest number of Dennis Loline buses, with 141. Other major customers included North Western Road Car Co. (50), Reading (26) and Walsall (17).

China Motor Bus in Hong Kong put one Dennis Loline into service in 1963. It was the first double-decker bus on Hong Kong Island.
