= Bristol Lodekka =

Low-height half-cab double-decker bus

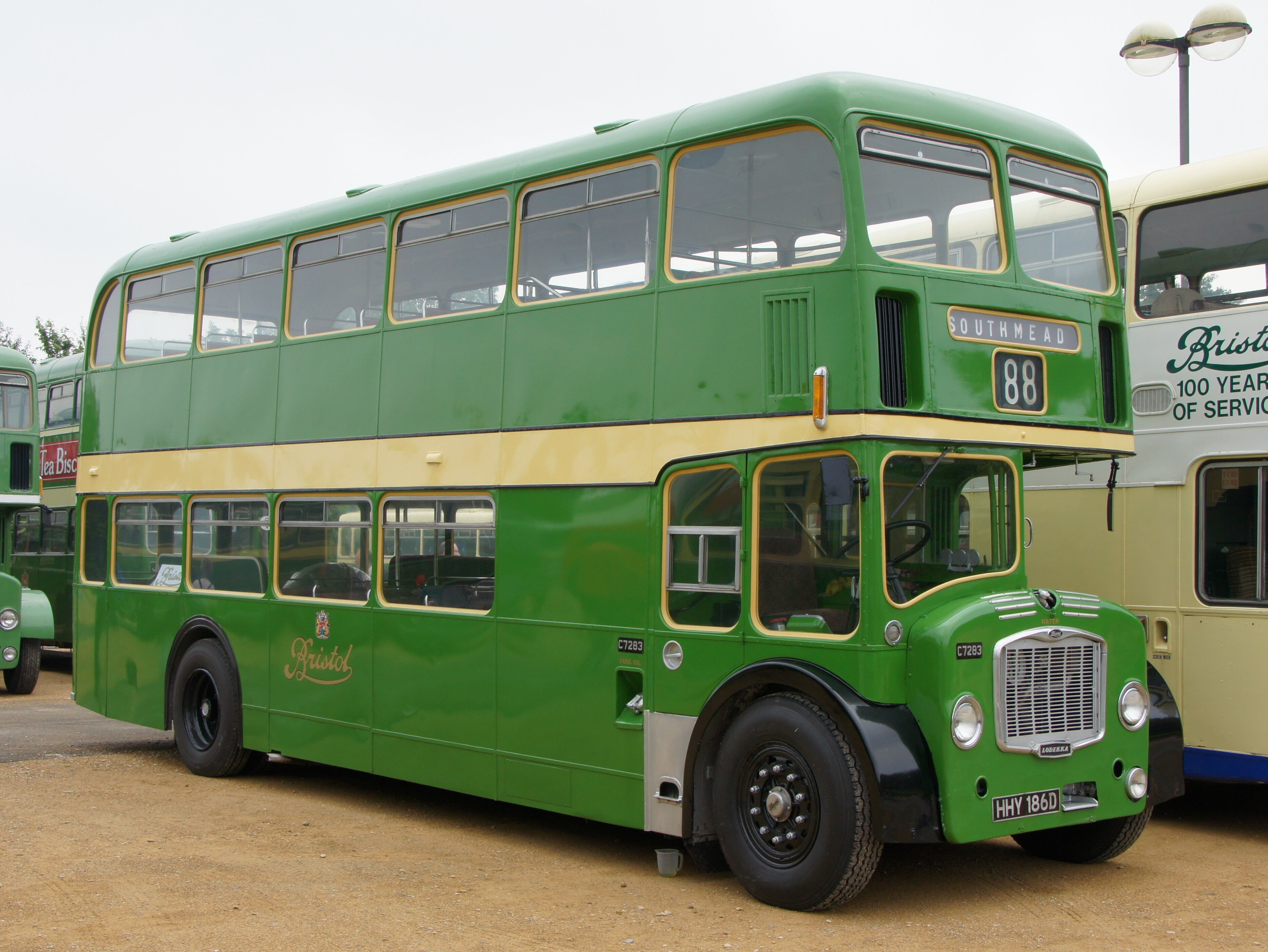
- Preserved Bristol Omnibus Company ECW bodied Bristol Lodekka FLF in Brislington in August 2012

Overview
- Manufacturer: Bristol Commercial Vehicles
- Production: 1953-1968
- Assembly: Chassis; Bristol, England; Body; Lowestoft, Suffolk, England

Body and chassis
- Doors: 1
- Floor type: Low floor
- Related: Dennis Loline

Powertrain
- Engine: Bristol AVW; Gardner 5LW; Gardner 6LW; Gardner 6LX; Leyland O.600; Leyland O.680
- Capacity: LDX/LD/LDS/FS models; 33/25 or 33/27; LDL/FL models; 37/33; FSF models; 34/26; most FLF models; 38/32 or 40/30; Scottish longer FLF; 44/32 or 44/34

Dimensions
- Length: 26 ft 0 in (7.92 m) (LDX); 27 ft 0 in (8.23 m) (LD, LDS, FS, FSF); 30 ft 0 in (9.14 m) (LDL, FL, most FLF); 31 ft 0.8 in (9.47 m) (Scottish longer FLF)
- Width: 8 ft 0 in (2.44 m)
- Height: 13 ft 3.1 in (4.041 m)

Chronology
- Predecessor: Bristol K
- Successor: Bristol VR

The Bristol Lodekka is a half-cab low-height step-free double-decker bus built by Bristol Commercial Vehicles in England. It was the first production bus design to have step-free access from passenger entrance throughout the lower deck.

== Design and development ==
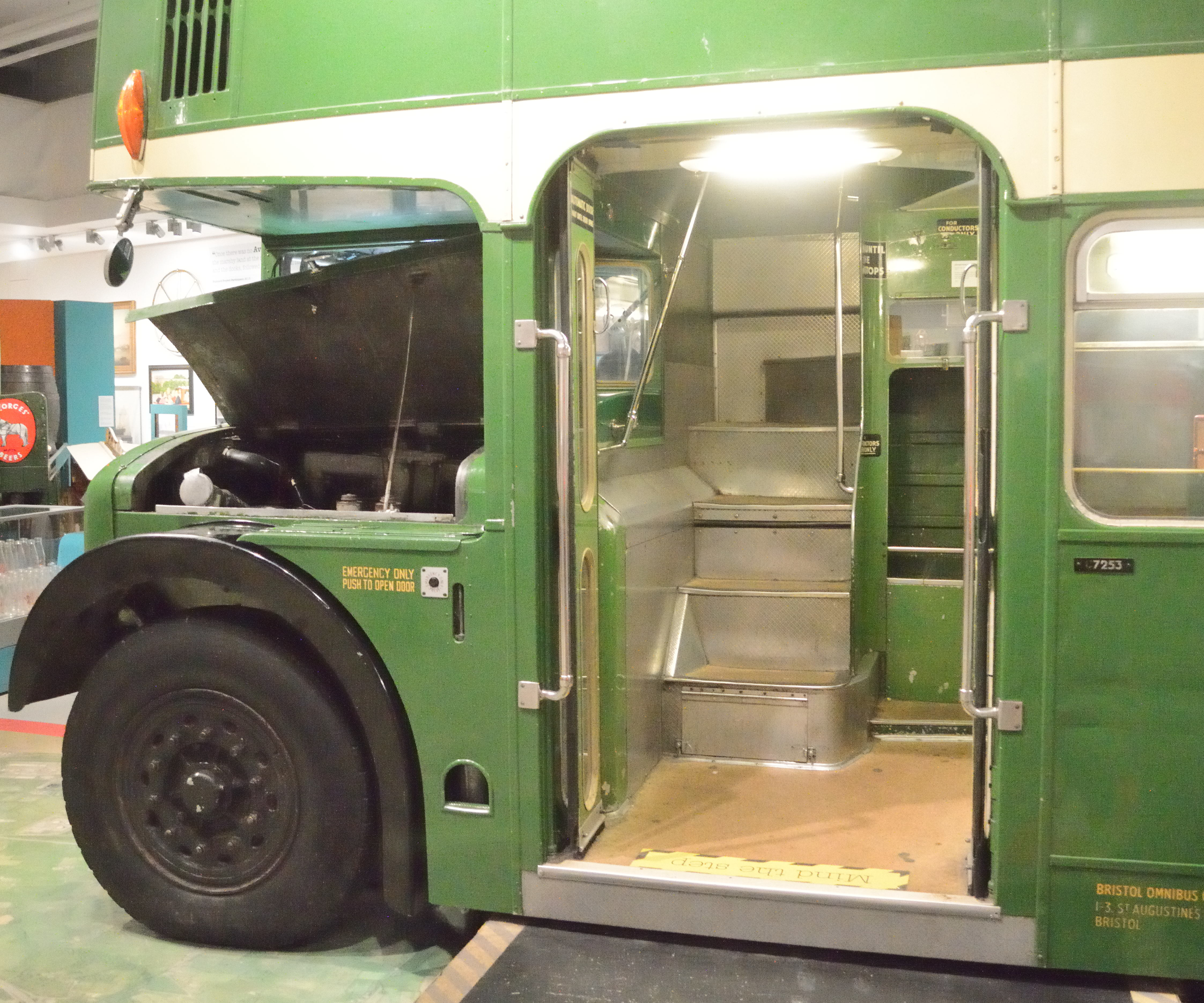
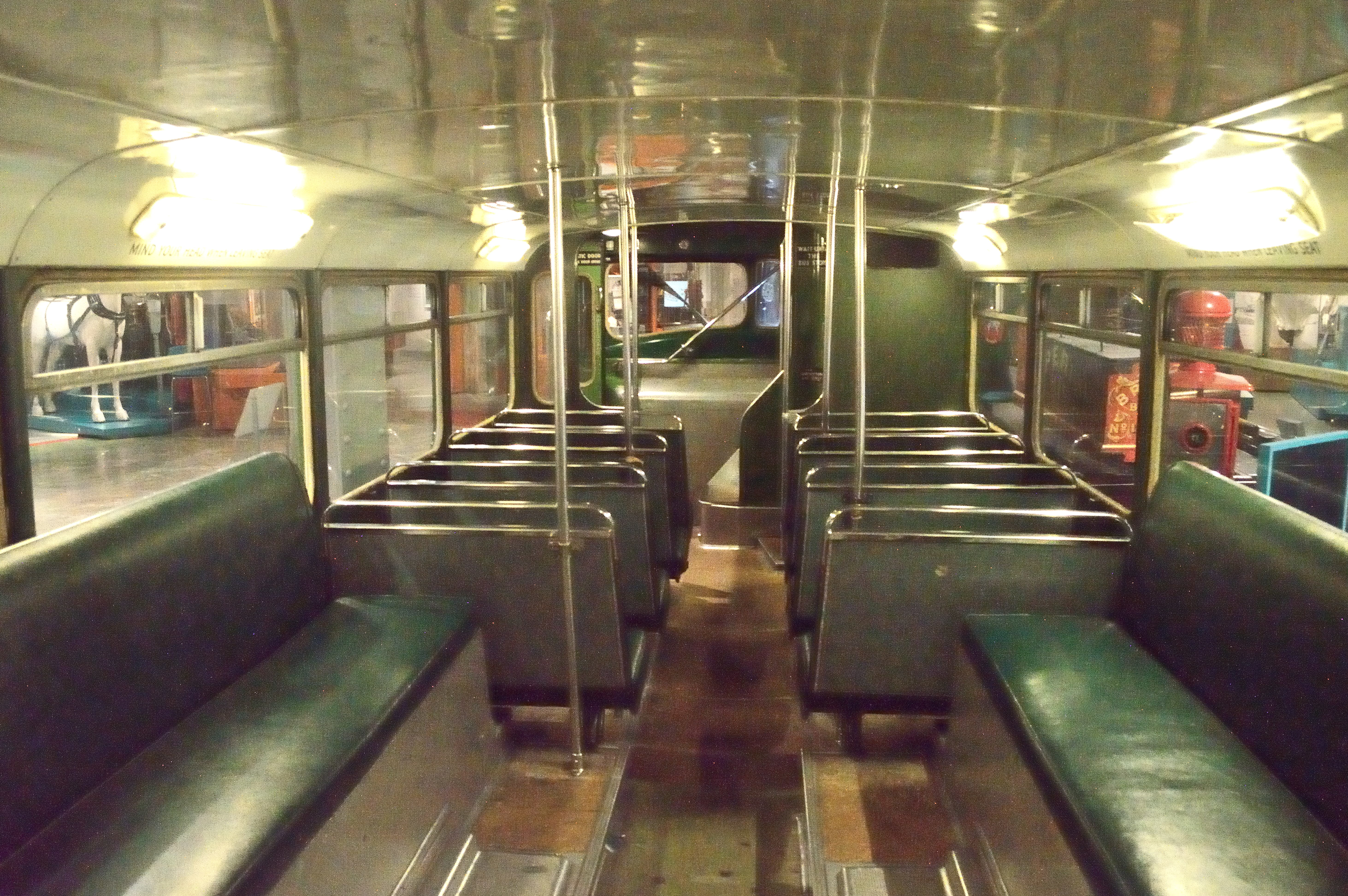
Passenger door and downstairs interior of a Bristol Omnibus Company Lodekka. Note the stairs directly in front of passenger door and bench seats over rear wheels.

The purpose of the Bristol Lodekka's design was to replace the traditional step-entrance and side-gangway lowbridge double-deck bus layout that had been widely disliked by both bus passengers and bus operating companies. Bristol's design lowered the chassis frame, integrating it with a 58-seat Eastern Coach Works body and fitting a drop-centre rear axle that meant there were no steps from the rear entrance platform to the front of the lower-deck gangway. On the early LDX, LD and first five LDL models, positioning of longitudinal chassis members allowed the gangway itself to be lowered about 10 centimetres (3.9 in) into a well below the seating platforms, and a full flat floor was later developed for the last LDL type, which was built into all LDS and the F series Lodekkas that followed.

All Lodekkas were built to a traditional half-cab design by Eastern Coach Works of Lowestoft, with the lower floor level allowing for a low overall body height. The earlier LD-series and the later FL and FS had a rear entrance platform, however the later FSF and FLF, equipped with rear air suspension, had a stepless forward entrance located behind the front axle and driver's cab, achieved via the reduction of the nearside chassis frame's height; early models had one-piece sliding doors, which were later replaced with faster four-leaf folding doors. Most Lodekkas were powered by five- or six-cylinder Gardner engines, with small number optioned with Bristol AVW or Leyland O.600 or O.680 engines.

=== Chassis codes ===
In accordance with Bristol Commercial Vehicles practice, chassis were designated by a two or three letter code, followed by the number of engine cylinders and engine manufacturer.

LDX: Low 'Decker, Experimental (the first two LD vehicles)
LD: Low 'Decker
LDL: Low 'Decker, Long (Essentially pre-production FL models - introduced when the maximum legal length of double deck buses was extended from 27 ft (8.2 m) to 30 ft (9.1 m). Braking was improved from the earlier vacuum assisted to compressed air assisted)
LDS: Low 'Decker, Short (Essentially pre-production FS models)
FS: Flat-floor, Short length
FSF: Flat-floor, Short length, Forward entrance
FL: Flat-floor, Long
FLF: Flat-floor, Long, Forward entrance

Example engine classifications

FS5G: FS with Gardner 5LW engine
FL6B: FL with Bristol BVW engine (AVW type in Bristol LD6B)
FLF6G: FLF with Gardner 6LW or 6LX engine
FLF6L: FLF with Leyland O.600 or O.680 engine

=== Dennis Loline ===
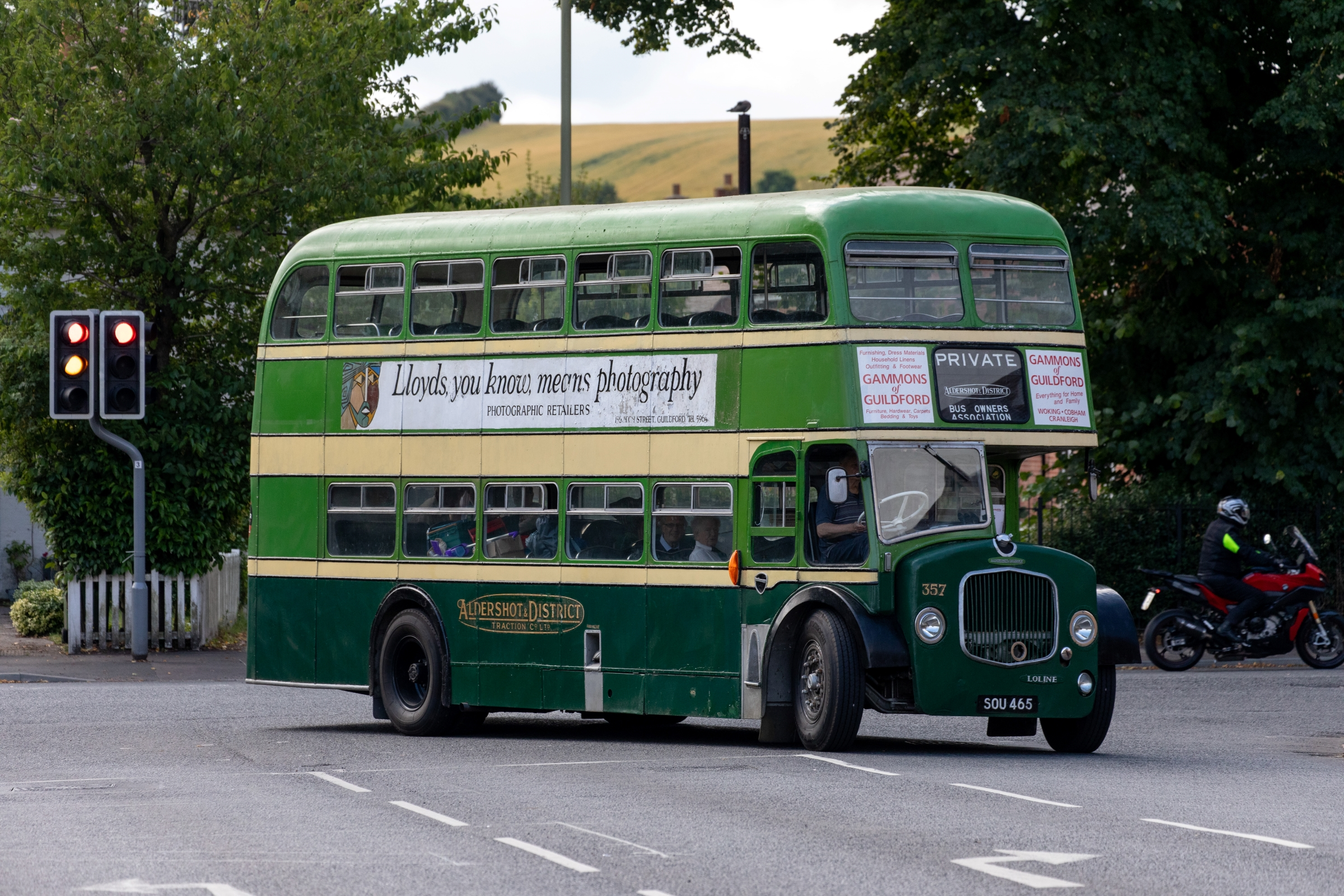
Preserved Aldershot & District Traction East Lancashire Coachbuilders bodied Dennis Loline in Alton in July 2024

Due to both Bristol Commercial Vehicles and Eastern Coach Works being brought into state ownership following the nationalisation of its parent Tilling Group, Lodekkas could only be bought by the British Transport Commission's bus subsidiaries, later becoming the Transport Holding Company. The design, though, was attractive to privately owned operators, leading to Bristol licensing the Lodekka design to Dennis Brothers Limited, who sold their variation of the design as the Dennis Loline. Equipped with a Gardner 6LW engine and a five-speed version of the reverse-drive gearbox used in the Dennis Hefty commercial chassis, this arrangement allowed for these operators to purchase buses built to a low-floor design.

== Operators ==
=== Prototypes ===
The first prototype Bristol Lodekka (chassis no. LDX001) was delivered to Bristol Tramways & Carriage Company Ltd in 1949, then an integral part of Bristol Commercial Vehicles. It was allocated fleet no. LC5000 and registered LHY 949, operating primarily on Bristol's 36 service between Old Market and Knowle but also toured around numerous British Transport Commission bus subsidiaries.

West Yorkshire Road Car Company took delivery of the second prototype Lodekka (chassis no. LDX002) in 1950. This was originally allocated fleet number 822, later renumbered DX1 under West Yorkshire's April 1954 renumbering scheme, and was registered JWT 712. This bus mainly operated on Harrogate bus route 36 between Harrogate and Leeds, though it was also toured around British Transport Commission subsidiaries and was displayed at the Festival of Britain's South Bank Exhibition in 1951.

=== Production ===
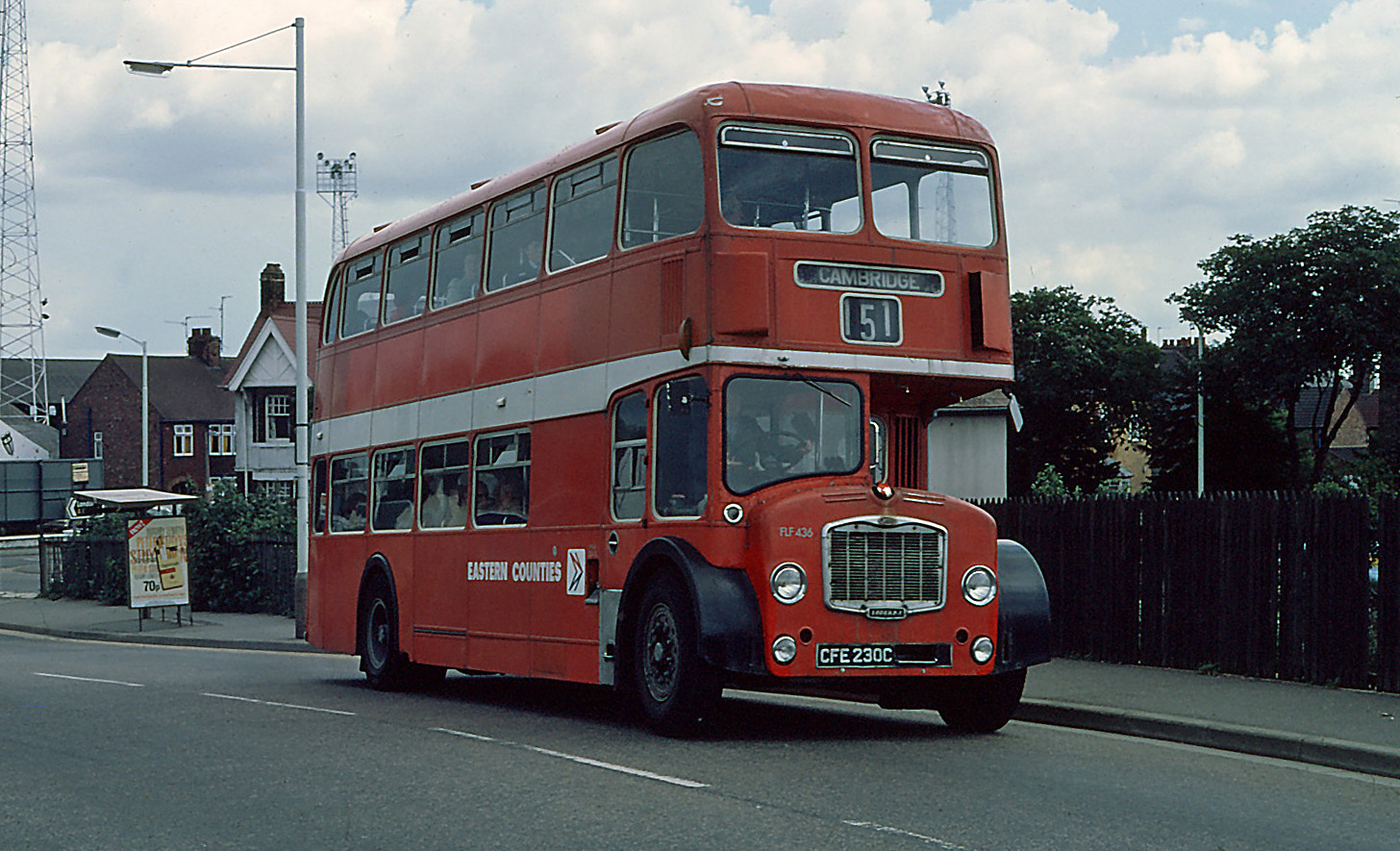
NBC Eastern Counties Bristol Lodekka FLF in Peterborough in July 1980

Despite the sales restrictions imposed on both Bristol Commercial Vehicles and ECW, over 5,000 production Lodekkas were built for use by nationalised bus companies across the United Kingdom as their standard double-decker bus between 1953 and 1968, with the largest Lodekka operator being Crosville Motor Services of North Wales; after the opening of a new bridge over the River Conwy to replace the weight-restricted Conwy Suspension Bridge, the operator purchased a total of 593 Lodekkas across nearly all chassis types, some of which were built as convertible open-top buses. Crosville also purchased eight LD6B coaches in 1954 for summer services linking North Wales seaside resorts with Merseyside, equipped with extended rear platforms, an offside emergency door, a straight staircase, three-tier luggage racks and tables.

Other nationalised operators in England and Wales who purchased the Bristol Lodekka included Brighton Hove & District, the Bristol Omnibus Company, Cumberland Motor Services, the Eastern Counties Omnibus Company, the Eastern National Omnibus Company, Hants & Dorset, Lincolnshire Road Car, Red & White Services, Southern Vectis, South Wales Transport, Luton & District, Thames Valley Traction, United Automobile Services, United Counties Omnibus, United Welsh, the West Yorkshire Road Car Company, Western National, Western Welsh, and Wilts & Dorset.

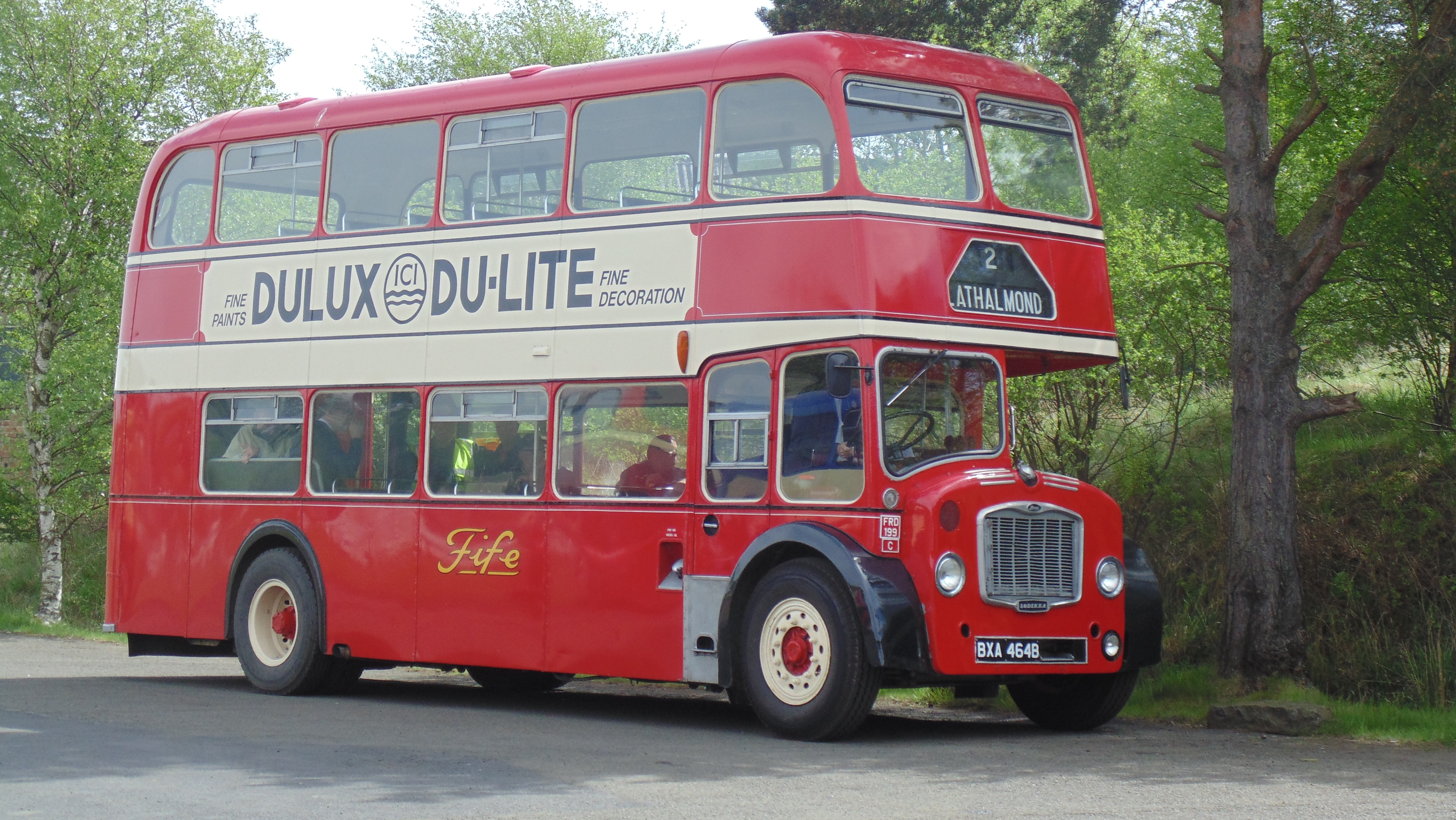
Preserved W. Alexander & Sons (Fife) Bristol Lodekka FS at the Scottish Vintage Bus Museum in May 2014

Scottish operators of the Bristol Lodekka, most of whom had never operated buses manufactured by Bristol before, included Scottish Motor Traction companies Central SMT, Western SMT and Scottish Omnibuses (later Eastern Scottish), as well as W. Alexander & Sons in the company's Fife and Southern operating areas. The Scottish Motor Traction, as well as the split Alexander companies, were both folded into the Scottish Bus Group (SBG), who continued ordering Lodekkas until 1967.

The formation of the National Bus Company (NBC) from the combined THC and British Electric Traction fleets in 1969 led to the arrival of more one-person operated and rear-engined buses, such as the Leyland Atlantean and the Lodekka's successor, the Bristol VRT. When its sister company the Scottish Bus Group were experiencing engineering problems with their new VRTs, the NBC decided they would exchange Lodekka FLFs to the SBG, receiving a similar number of VRTs in return. In the exchange, which took place at the Carlisle depot of Ribble Motor Services, 43 FLF Lodekkas were acquired by SBG companies from Eastern Counties, 12 were acquired from Thames Valley, eleven from Northern General, nine from United, seven from Brighton & Hove, four from United Counties, three from Southern Vectis and two from Bristol Omnibus.

=== Further use ===
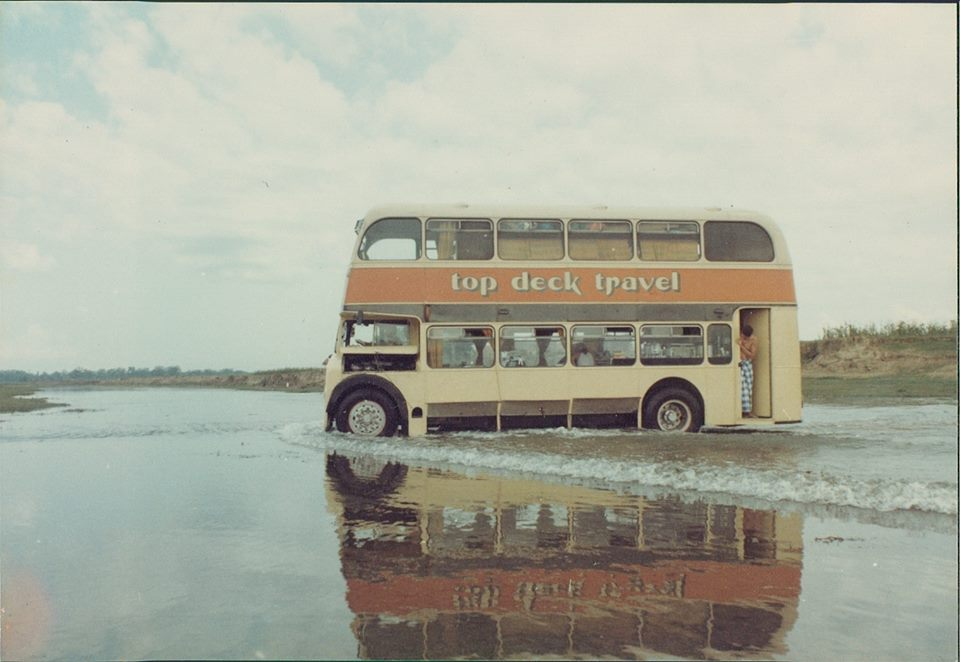
A Top Deck Travel Bristol Lodekka crossing a creek in Northern India in 1983

Surrey-based Top Deck Travel converted approximately 100 Bristol Lodekkas to 'deckerhome' campervans between 1973 and 1997 for use on cross-continent overland tours of Europe, Asia and North America, with the company operating a peak fleet of over 60 across multiple continents during the 1980s. These Lodekkas were typically equipped with a kitchen area, a water tank, sound systems, bunk beds and convertible seating/storage areas, with the North American Lodekkas, making use of campsite power outlets, additionally equipped with a television, a microwave, and a toaster. Top Deck Travel's Lodekka tours of North America ceased operations in 1986 due to increasing insurance and regulatory pressures, with the European programme dropped after 1996 due to low demand.

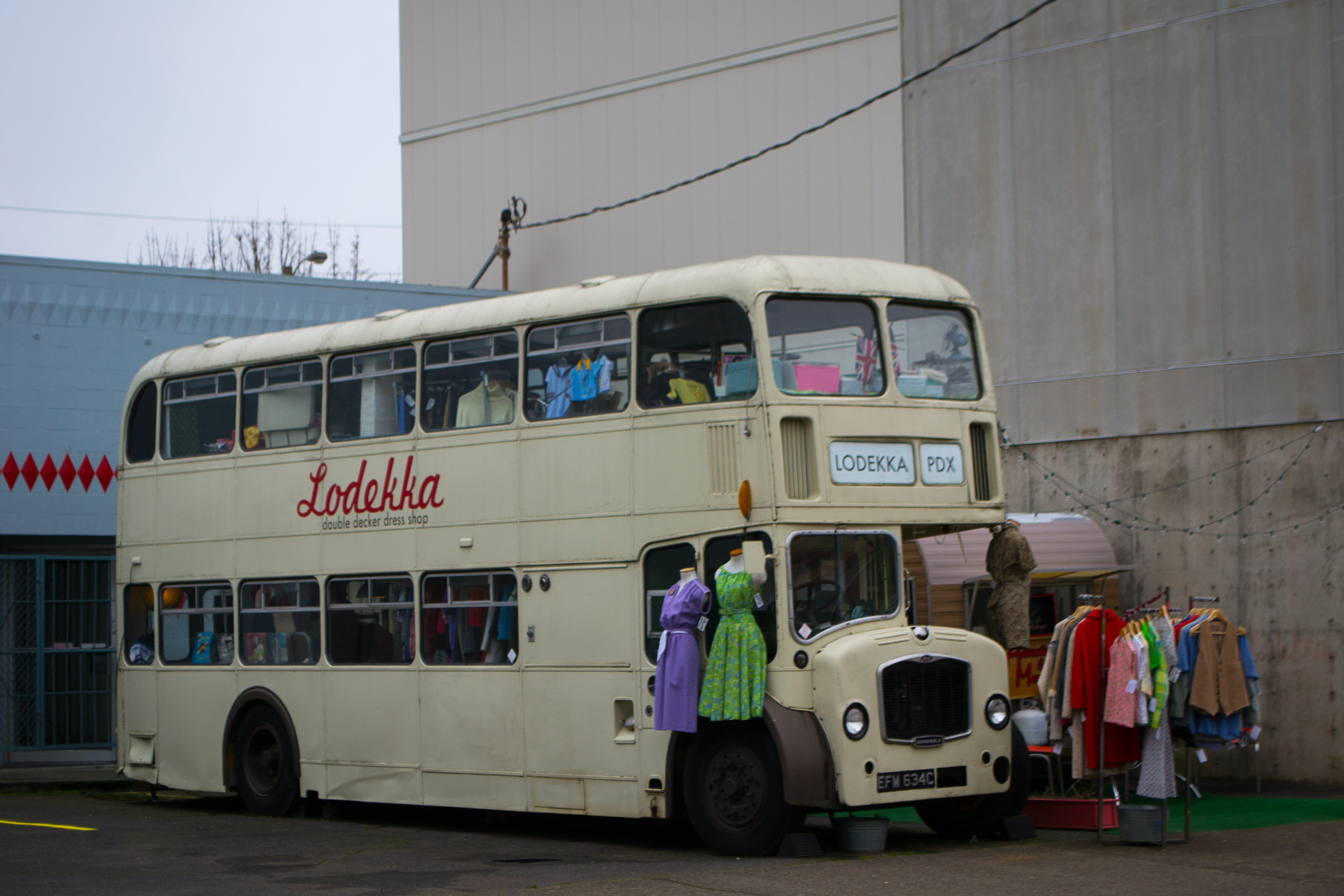
The Lodekka Double Decker Dress Shop in Portland, Oregon in February 2013

Bristol Lodekkas are highly popular export vehicles for non-passenger-carrying use across Continental Europe and North America, with imports to the United States commencing in the late 1970s after the supply of genuine ex-London Transport AEC Regent III RTs had been exhausted; differing height regulations in several US states mean that only low-height double-deckers can be legally driven on public roads. Examples of these Lodekka operators in the United States include a dress store in Portland, Oregon named 'Lodekka', making use of a Lodekka that was originally being converted into a living space in the nearby city of Springfield, as well as a party bus charter company 'Double Decker PDX' also operating in Portland, a cupcake bakery in Saratoga Springs, New York named Bettie's Cakes, and various other restaurants and catering services.

A handful of overseas bus operators also exported second-hand Bristol Lodekkas from the United Kingdom for further passenger-carrying service during the 1980s, with Fok Lei Autocarro S.A of Macau taking delivery of three and Citybus of Hong Kong operating a single Lodekka in its fleet.

== See also ==
- List of buses
