= Comfy Coaches =

Comfy Coaches Limited was a pioneer motor coach operating company in Lower Bourne, Farnham, Surrey, providing excursion and private hire services from 1926 until 1962 when it ceased trading, its owner deciding to concentrate on his car dealership and workshops. Its route licences were sold to the Aldershot & District Traction Company Ltd and the vehicles disposed of to various buyers.

== History ==
=== The Pre-War Years ===
Mr E R Gudge commenced trading at Crossroads Garage, 44 Frensham Road, Lower Bourne on 3 January 1921. The company operated primarily as a motor vehicle dealer and repairer, and owned two private hire cars. Following a fire on 3 January 1923, a new larger workshop was constructed and the decision was made to operate vehicles for passenger transport. Company records show that in 1926 the first coach was purchased. A further seven vehicles were bought between 1929 and 1939. During this period, the company had quickly become established as a reliable company undertaking daily excursions, and as a private hire specialist.

=== World War II ===
Following declaration of war in 1939 parts of Crossroads Garage were requisitioned as an Auxiliary Fire Service station which was staffed full-time.

During 1940 a contract for the conveyance of workmen and ENSA artists kept the coach business viable until the end of the war. The close proximity of Aldershot Garrison helped to provide this much-needed business. In 1940 - 1941 two further vehicles were purchased, these having been first registered in Falkirk in 1936, and St Albans in 1939; both had been operated by the War Department and arrived in camouflage. In 1943 another coach was purchased second-hand.

=== The post-war years ===
Following the cessation of hostilities the company was allowed to recommence work, although this was restricted to a 35-mile radius, which made Southsea a popular destination. These excursions were heavily oversubscribed with passengers from the surrounding area, determined to return to their normal ways of recreation. One of the vehicles was used during VE parade celebrations, in Lower Bourne and Farnham.

The late 1940s saw a significant expansion of the fleet and disposal of some of the older vehicles. This was a substantial investment for the company, and reiterated its intention to give the passengers reliability and comfort. In 1953 the company opened a booking office in Castle Street, Farnham, which offered over one hundred licensed destinations. The popular day excursions to the South Coast continued, with trips to Clacton on Sea, Widecombe, and Bekonscot Model Village being examples of the excursions on offer. The company now operated three-day excursions to Blackpool; North and South Devon and special excursions were on offer. The private hire business proved so popular, that on Saturdays during the summer months the assistance of other operators was required. Occasionally, assistance was required on a Sunday, with owned company vehicles being solely responsible for excursion and tour business during these busy periods.

For the long distance work an extra fuel tank was added, and the seating capacity reduced for passenger comfort. Manning levels on the vehicles were also varied to accommodate some locations. For long distance day tours, generally those of over 300 miles (popularly known as Picnic Tours), allowance was made for two drivers to be available for one coach or three drivers to two vehicles, dependent on passenger numbers.

Contracts with the Education Authority and school trips were awarded to the company, and many people in the local area have fond memories of travelling on a Comfy Coach. Special tours were also being undertaken, such as two-week tours of Scotland with Farnham Town Junior Choir.

Modernisation of the fleet continued through the 1950s and, in 1956, the company first participated in the British Coach Rally at Brighton, the inaugural rally having taken place in 1955 at Clacton. The rally was held over two days, normally in April or May. On this occasion the first day consisted of the driving section, where the vehicle was timed en route, which that year commenced at the Marquis of Granby in Esher through controlled check points to Madeira Drive in Brighton. Five driving skills tests were completed on arrival at Brighton, with a further three skills tests and the Concours d'Elegance, the judging of the vehicle, taking place on the Sunday. From the fifty four entrants that year, 10th position on the Concours d'Elegance was achieved. In 1958 driver R Bell achieved First in the Road Section and Driving tests, and Second on the Concours d'Elegance.

The company continued to modernise its fleet through the 1950s but 1961 was the last year the company purchased a vehicle. On the retirement of the founder Mr Ernie Gudge in 1962, his son Mr Norman Gudge considered the option of retaining the two businesses (Comfy Coaches Ltd and the service garage of E R Gudge), by employing a manager for one of the two and retaining full control. Both businesses were enjoying good support from the public, but due to the affordability of the motor car, it was perceived that more growth could be achieved by retaining the service garage. Comfy Coaches Ltd ceased trading in April 1962.

The route licences and the Farnham Booking Office business were sold to Aldershot and District Traction Company, and the vehicles sold to several private companies. The vacated garage space was used for the expansion of car servicing and repair, which proved to be a successful Morris, Riley and MG dealership. The business passed through various hands until, in 2012, planning permission was granted for development of the site as housing.

=== Heritage activities ===
In April 1962 Taylor's of Sutton Scotney purchased 999 PPL, the 29 seat Bedford J4ZL with a Plaxton Body, which they operated to around 1993 in the latter years as Nostalgic Tours. During 1994 Mr Norman Gudge was looking for an ex Comfy Coach, with the view to restoration. Contact was made with Taylor's who sold the coach back to Norman Gudge in April 1994 some 32 years after the original sale on the demise of Comfy Coaches.

Appropriate storage facilities proved to be a problem and after a couple of moves the vehicle ended up residing in the corner of a farmyard. A significant amount of mechanical renovation was undertaken at this time, but the body remained untouched.

During early 2004 a number of interested parties, including the founder's grandson, formed an alliance to rescue and restore the coach. A section of a modern farm building has since been leased to provide covered accommodation and the restoration has begun. A support group, the Comfy Coaches Interest Group has been formed with the intention of not only supporting the coach restoration project, but to gather and protect an archive of photographs, documents and other items relating to Comfy Coaches.

== See also ==
- List of bus operators of the United Kingdom
