= Lowbridge double-deck bus =

Double-decker bus with lowered roof to fit under bridges

A lowbridge double-deck bus is a double-decker bus that has an asymmetric interior layout, enabling the overall height of the vehicle to be reduced compared to that of a conventional double-decker bus. The upper-deck gangway is offset to one side of the vehicle, normally the offside (or driver's side), and is sunken into the lower-deck passenger saloon. Low railway bridges and overpasses are the main reason that a reduced height is desired.

== Origins ==
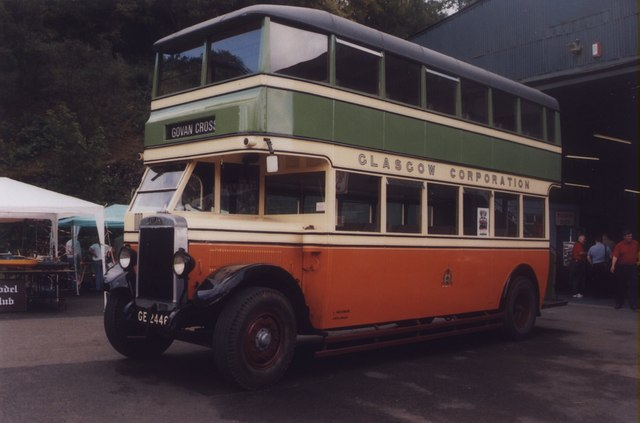
A preserved Leyland Titan TD1 of Glasgow Corporation at the Scottish Vintage Bus Museum

The lowbridge design was introduced and patented by Leyland in 1927 on their Titan TD1 chassis. Early examples were delivered to Glasgow Corporation amongst other operators. One of the Glasgow vehicles is preserved at the Scottish Vintage Bus Museum, Lathalmond, Fife.

== Disadvantages ==
A major disadvantage of this layout was the inconvenient seating layout, with four-abreast seats upstairs making it difficult for passengers to manoeuvre past each other if those farthest from the gangway needed to alight first. A second disadvantage was the restricted headroom for passengers on the offside of the lower deck, as a result of the encroachment of the upper-deck gangway. It was often the case that passengers would bump their heads on it when standing up to alight.

== Alternatives ==
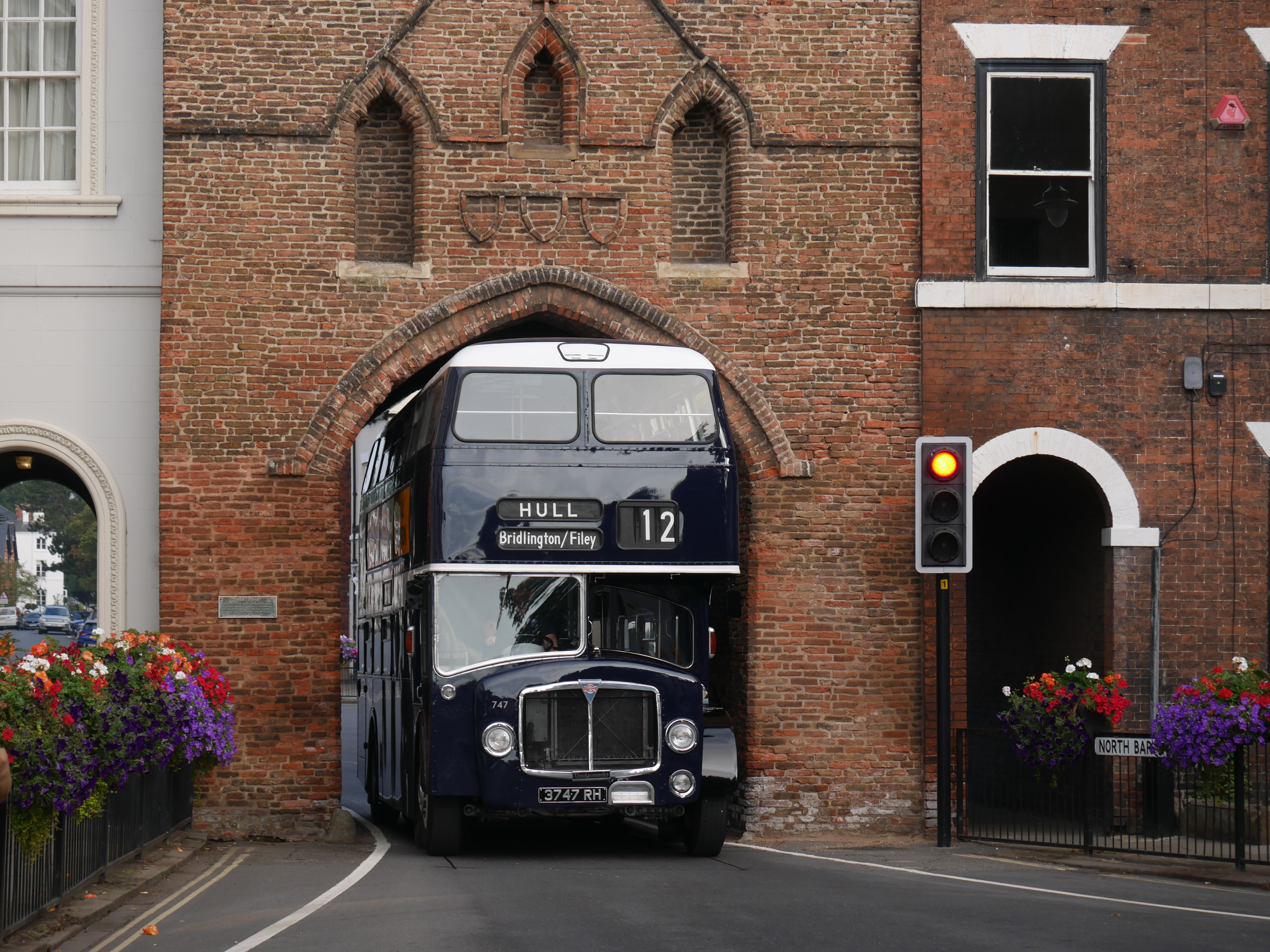
The sharply-arched Beverley Bar necessitated a special bus design. A preserved East Yorkshire Motor Services AEC Bridgemaster with an arched roof passes under the Bar in August 2022.

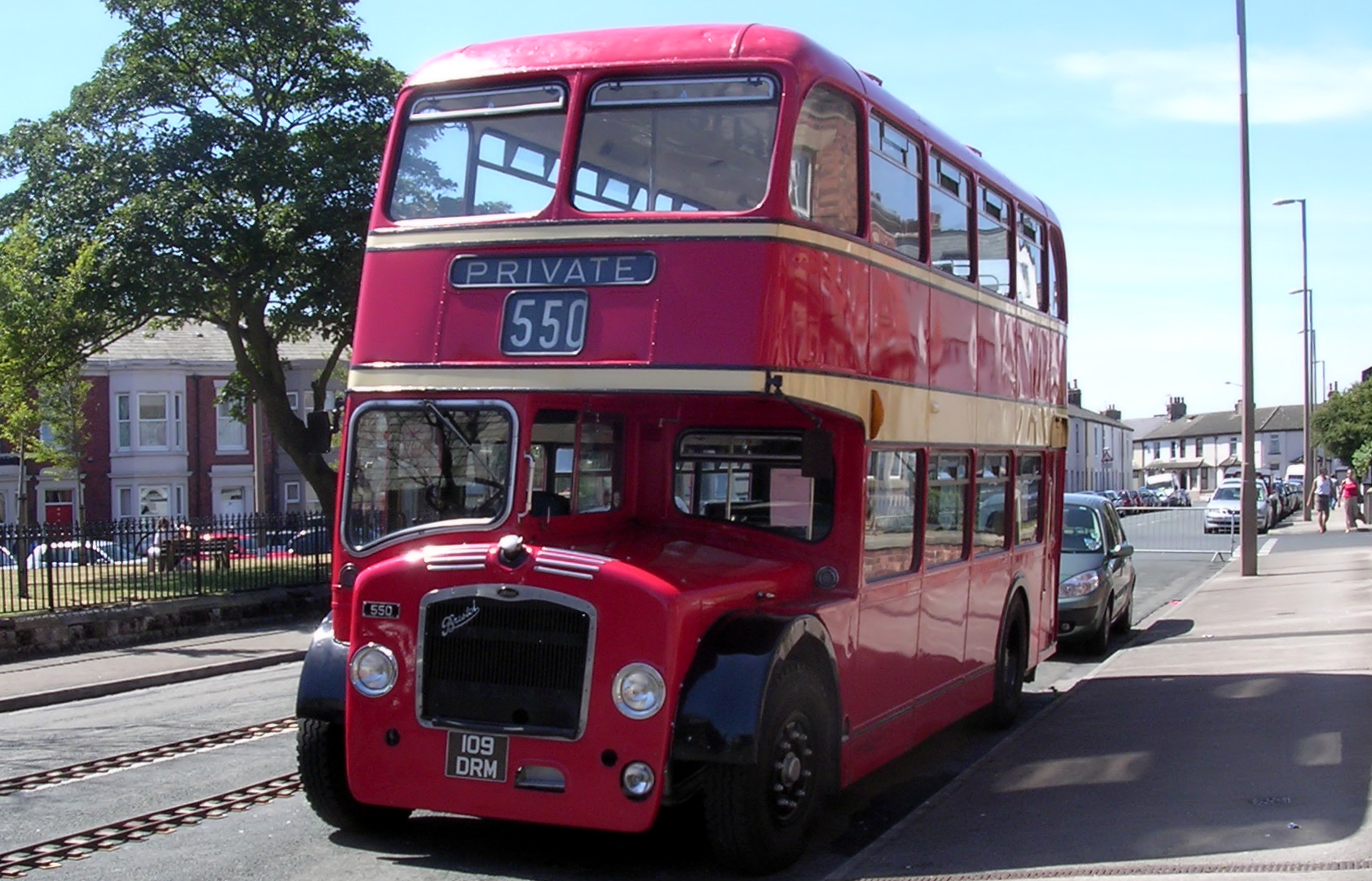
Bristol Lodekka FS6G – the first British alternative to the lowbridge design

At first, there was no viable alternative to the lowbridge design, apart from the use of single-decker bus. However, the lowbridge type started to become obsolete when low-height chassis were developed, which used a dropped-center rear axle to enable the lower-deck gangway to be lowered. This enabled a low-height vehicle to be built without the need for the cumbersome seating layout upstairs.

The first such design was the Bristol Lodekka, which was introduced by Bristol in 1949. Built with bodywork by Eastern Coach Works, the Lodekka had a height of around 13 ft 6 in (4.11 m) compared to a typical height of around 14 ft 6 in (4.42 m) for a conventional highbridge double-decker. It was, however, available to companies part of the state-owned British Transport Commission, which Bristol was a part of at the time. Other low-height double-deckers included the Dennis Loline, a version of the Bristol Lodekka built under licence; the AEC Bridgemaster and Renown; and the Albion Lowlander, a low-height version of the Leyland Titan PD3. The rear-engined Daimler Fleetline and Bristol VR were also low-height chassis. Nonetheless, despite the advent of the low-height chassis, the last lowbridge double-decker was not built until 1968.

When the rear-engined Leyland Atlantean was first introduced in 1958, it did not have a dropped-centre rear axle, even though the prototype had featured one. As a result, some Atlanteans were built to a "semi-lowbridge" layout, with the front half of the upper deck laid out conventionally, and a side gangway with raised seating area towards the rear.

A special situation existed in Beverley in the East Riding of Yorkshire, where buses had to pass underneath the arched structure of the Beverley Bar. To facilitate this, East Yorkshire Motor Services had a number of double-deckers built with special "Gothic" roofs of severely-arched profile from 1935 to 1970, when a bypass road was opened around the Bar, to match the shape of the arch.

Similarly, North Western ordered a number of single-decker buses with an unusual roof profile to clear a very low road bridge under the Bridgewater Canal at Dunham Massey. The buses also had smaller wheels than normal buses.

== Notable vehicles ==
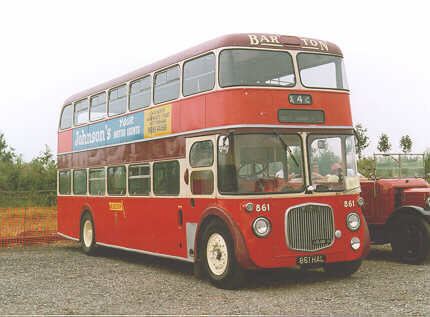
Barton's unique Dennis Loline, 861

A notable lowbridge bus is Barton Transport's no. 861, registered 861 HAL. It is unique in combining a low-height chassis (Dennis Loline II) with lowbridge bodywork, built by Northern Counties for navigating a very low bridge at Sawley that was impassable for conventional lowbridge buses. With the combined effect of both these height reduction techniques, the height of the vehicle is 12 ft 5 in (3.78 m), which remains the lowest ever for a British closed-top double-decker.

The last lowbridge double-decker to be built was bought by Bedwas and Machen UDC, a small municipal bus fleet in south Wales, in 1968. It is a Leyland Titan PD3 with bodywork built by Massey of Wigan, and is registered PAX 466F. Following its sale by B&MUDC's successor, Rhymney Valley District Council, it was operated by Stevensons of Uttoxeter and subsequently by MK Metro of Milton Keynes.

Both buses been preserved.

== See also ==
- AEC Regent III
- Bus manufacturing
- List of buses
