= Yorkshire (Woollen District) Electric Tramways =

Former tram system in localised West Yorkshire

Operation
- Locale: Dewsbury
- Open: 18 February 1903
- Close: 31 October 1934
- Status: Closed

Infrastructure
- Track gauge: 4 ft 8 1/2 in (1,435 mm)
- Propulsion system: Electric

Statistics
- Route length: 22.92 miles (36.89 km)

The Yorkshire (Woollen District) Electric Tramways operated a tramway service in Dewsbury between 1903 and 1934.

== History ==
Under the Spen Valley Light Railways Order of 1901 British Electric Traction set up the Yorkshire (Woollen District) Electric Tramways.

The company established a tramway network centred on Dewsbury with branches to Cleckheaton, Birkenshaw, Ravensthorpe, Thornhill and Birstal.

Operations were replaced by the buses of British Electric Traction-owned Yorkshire Woollen District Transport Company.

== Closure ==
Services ended on 31 October 1934.
