= Aldershot & District Traction =

English bus company

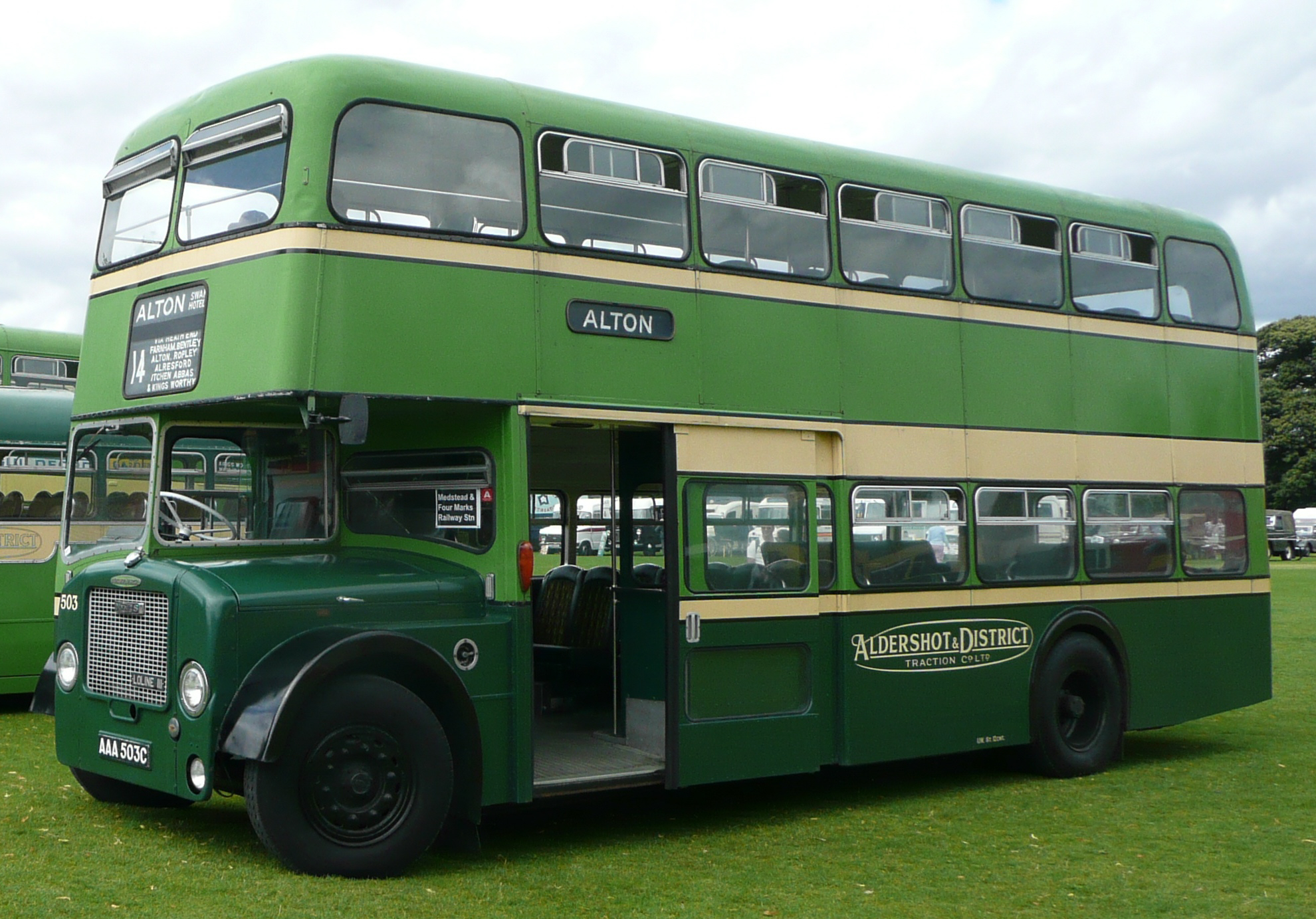
- A preserved Aldershot & District bus at the 2008 Alton rally.
- Industry: Public transport
- Founded: 24 July 1912
- Defunct: 1 January 1972
- Fate: Merged with Thames Valley Traction
- Successor: Alder Valley
- Areas served: Hampshire and Surrey

Aldershot & District Traction Company Limited was a major bus company operating services in East Hampshire, West Surrey and parts of adjoining counties for sixty years during the 20th century, from 1912 until 1972 when it became part of Alder Valley.

== History ==
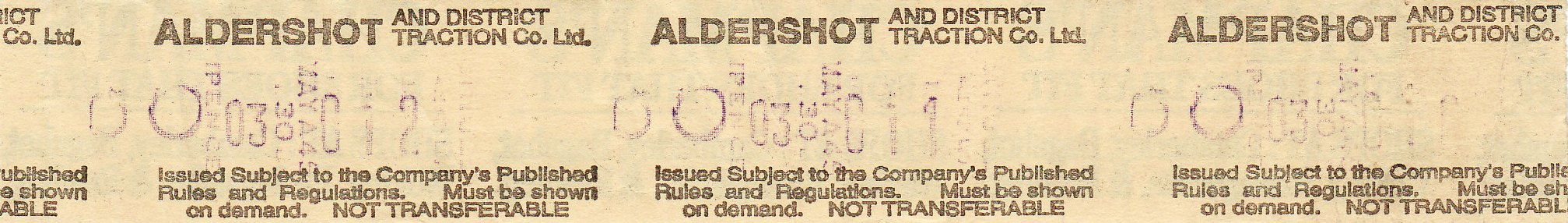
An Aldershot & District ticket.

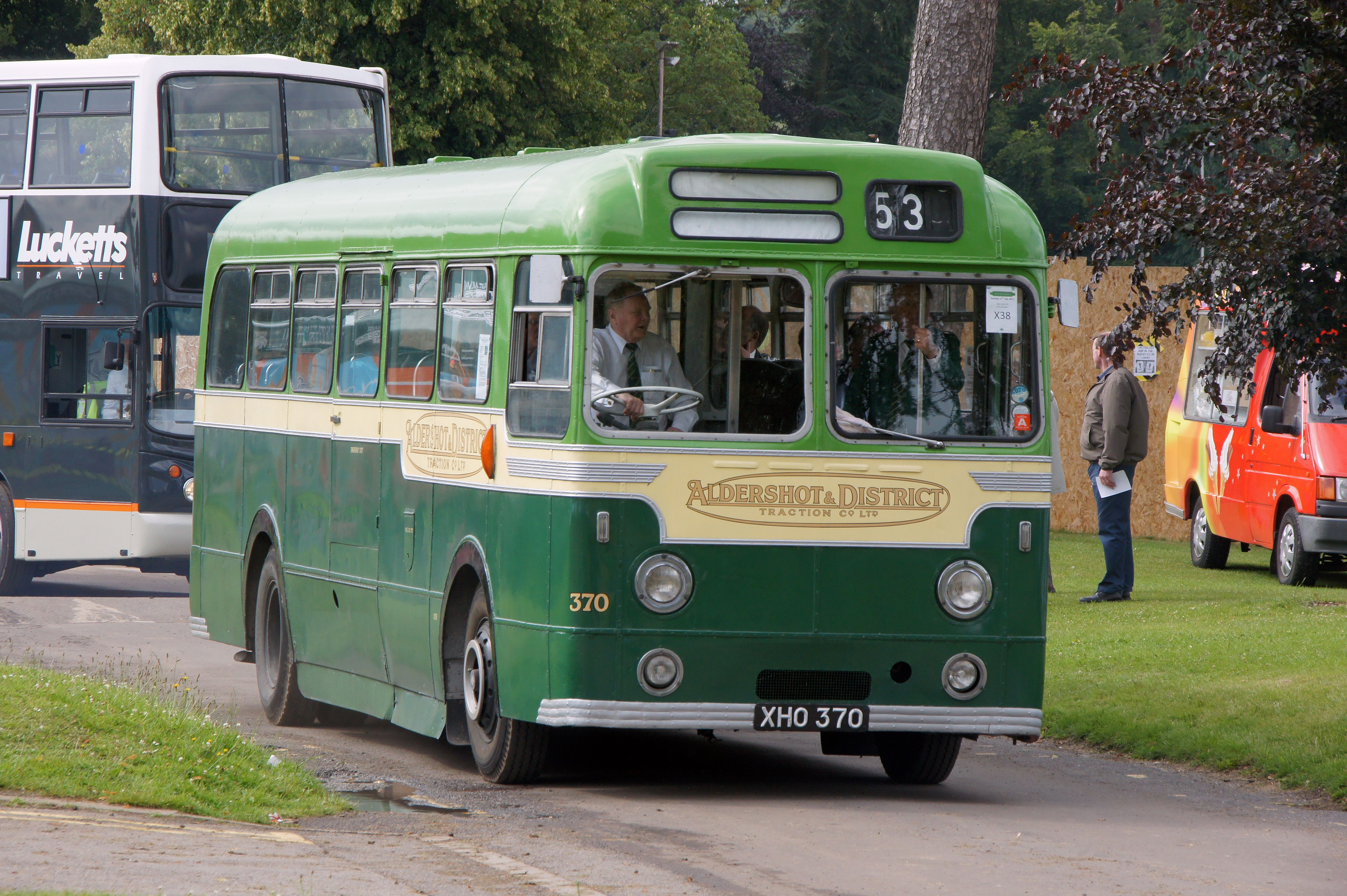
Former Aldershot & District AEC Reliance bus at the 2011 Alton bus rally

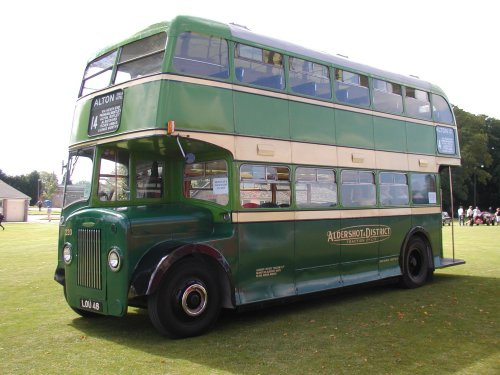
Dennis Lance at Alton 2008 rally

Aldershot & District was inaugurated on 24 July 1912 when the British Automobile Traction Company Limited (a subsidiary of British Electric Traction Company - BET) bought the pioneering Aldershot & Farnborough Motor Omnibus Company Ltd, whose five buses had operated services between those two towns since 1906. The initial livery was dark green and white, with the upper deck of double-deckers being a lighter green. Variations on a theme of two-tone green continued, later with cream relief replacing the white. The familiar looped fleetname was introduced in 1923 and lasted until 1968. In its early years, the company was also a general haulage contractor, operating a fleet of Foden steam lorries. In common with many other rural bus companies, it also carried parcels on its buses until the 1970s.

There was increasingly close co-operation between British Automobile Traction and rivals Thomas Tilling in the 1920s and, in 1928 BAT was reconstructed with the new title, Tilling & British Automobile Traction Ltd but, in 1942 the company was wound up and A&D's ownership reverted to the parent company BET.

Aldershot & District expanded during the pre-World War II period, taking over a number of smaller concerns and establishing depots at Guildford, Woking, Hindhead, Haslemere, and Alton, with smaller "outstations" elsewhere. World War II provided a challenge to the company – conscription meant that fewer men were available to serve as bus crews, service engineers and administrators, which meant recruitment and training of a great number of women, and maintenance of the vehicles was difficult; requisition of vehicles to replace destroyed vehicles in London or for conversion to military ambulances caused shortages locally and being based in Aldershot (the "Home of the British Army") meant that the company's vehicles were in continuous demand for transport of troops.

Following the war the company invested in new vehicles, mainly AEC single-deckers and Dennis double-deckers and services returned to pre-war levels for a while, until the increase in car-ownership brought about significant loss of custom from the mid-1950s onwards. A&D sought to minimise the impact by taking over routes from other operators, for instance Yellow Bus Services, Guildford. Large peaks in traffic levels occurred on a regular basis to meet the special demands of the Aldershot Military Tattoo and the Farnborough Airshow. Passenger numbers had peaked in 1950 at almost 52,000,000 journeys. At its peak services based in Aldershot and Guildford reached as far as Reading, Egham, London, Horsham, Bognor Regis, Petersfield and Winchester. Seasonal services operated to coastal towns such as Hastings, Eastbourne, Brighton, Worthing, Portsmouth and Southsea. Summer excursions ran to many destinations including Cheddar Caves, Longleat Safari Park, Hampton Court and race meetings such as Goodwood and Ascot. Demand for services to local beauty spot Frensham Ponds on summer Sundays sometimes necessitated running an extra double-decker for that part of route 19 in addition to the usual single-decker. Buses and coaches were also available for private hire, often being used by works' social clubs and public houses for outings. Some services were operated jointly with other companies, such as the service to Reading (jointly with the Thames Valley Traction Company. Through tickets were available on many routes, allowing the traveller to transfer from the A&D bus to another company's vehicle to complete the journey (e.g. Aldershot to Southampton, changing at Winchester to a Hants and Dorset vehicle). On some routes return tickets were valid for use by bus or train, both in Southern Railway and British Rail periods. The company absorbed the private hire and excursion coach company of Gudge's of Lower Bourne (trading as "Comfy Coaches") during the 1960s, which also gave them a booking and enquiry office in Farnham.

Although BET had campaigned vigorously against the proposed compulsory nationalisation of the UK bus industry, the company's policy changed and it sold its bus interests to the government's Transport Holding Company on 14 March 1968. The Transport Act 1968 formed the National Bus Company, which came into existence on 1 January 1969, amalgamating the interests of The Tilling Group (BET's main competitor) with the recently acquired BET Group. From that point the company's independence was lost, as exemplified by the immediate change in purchasing policy, with centrally-specified Bristol buses coming in instead of the locally sourced Dennis and AEC vehicles. The company continued to trade as Aldershot and District under nationalised ownership until it was merged with the former Tilling Group company, Thames Valley Traction Company Limited on 1 January 1972 to form the Thames Valley and Aldershot Omnibus Company, which traded under the contrived fleet name of Alder Valley.

== Trivia ==
- The Aldershot & District company had a play-on-words used by some user groups, "Have a shot and risk it".
- In 2012 to mark the centenary of the former longstanding company's incorporation, Stagecoach briefly repainted some of its local vehicles as A&D.

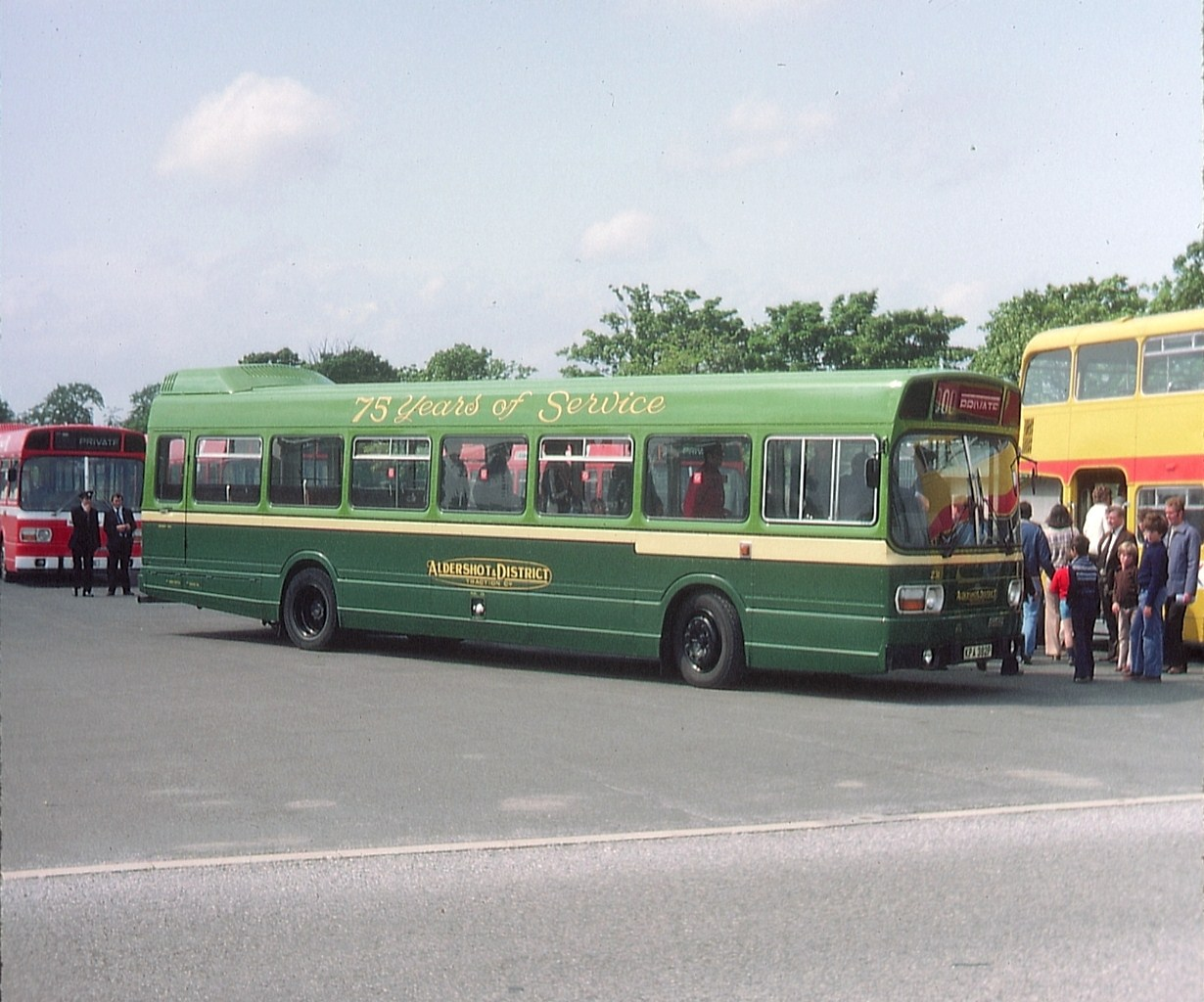
Leyland National in Aldershot and District livery in 1981.

== See also ==
- List of bus operators of the United Kingdom
