= W. A. Robotham =

Rolls-Royce executive (1899-1980)

William Arthur Robotham (26 November 1899 – 1980) was a Rolls-Royce executive involved in the development of Rolls-Royce cars, during World War II of tanks and tank engines, and post-war of Rolls-Royce and Bentley cars complete with bodies (Note: Prewar, all Rolls-Royces were supplied as rolling chassis to a coachbuilder.) and then of industrial petrol and diesel engines.

== Early career ==
William Arthur "Rm" Robotham was born at Shardlow, Derby, William Blews Robotham (1863-1943), his father, was a solicitor and twice Mayor of Derby. Robotham joined Rolls-Royce as a premium apprentice (Note: A premium apprentice has paid his employer a premium at least equivalent to all his wages during the period of his apprenticeship or indenture.) in 1919. In four years the apprentices went to every department of the factory; although they did not have to undertake any study at a technical college, Robotham went to night school two or three evenings a week studying mathematics and engineering drawing. They were paid 5s per week. He had an "old and slow" Rover motorcycle, and in weekends played golf, tennis (Note: He played in the county tennis team for Derbyshire.) or went on Sunday motorcycle outings with other apprentices.

== Rolls-Royce cars ==
In 1923 after finishing his apprenticeship he became a junior technician in the Experimental Department at Derby under Ernest Hives: Hives was also in charge of production at the Derby Works. Designing was done at West Wittering, Sussex or Le Canadel in France, and at London were Sales (Conduit Street), the London Service and Repair Department (Cricklewood) and all the directors except Royce. (Note: Royce lived in "Elmstead", his house at West Wittering, near the coast in West Sussex, and the designer's drawing office was in a building called Camacha about a quarter of a mile away (to avoid distraction; for some time there was no telephone at the drawing-office, so Royce’s secretary Marmont cycled with messages). Because of bad health, Royce spent half the year at Le Canadel in France.)

Experience from 1933 on showed that sales averaged about 1,500 cars per year as Rolls-Royce or Bentley; with the price about twice that of the best quantity-produced car, all with 6-cylinder engines (cars with 8 or 4-cylinder engines were not required unless volume production of more than 10,000 cars a year was proposed). Their cars were supplied as rolling chassis to custom coachbuilders in London, the "provinces", or Paris (e.g. Park Ward, Thrupp & Maberly, Arthur Mulliner, H. J. Mulliner & Co., Hooper or De Villars). Up to 25 bodies were built to the same specification.

Some cars were built for foreign potentates under instruction for the Government. After an official visit from Amanullah Khan, the King of Afghanistan, he was shown at the Derby works an open tourer with a body by Barker's which was sold to him. Robotham was disgusted when Barker's got the order, until hearing that they had "great problems" in collecting payment. Another foreign buyer "which could not be refused" was for two limousines and a saloon; to be immune from a Mauser bullet fired at ten paces. The three Rolls-Royce Phantom IVs were for Generallisimo Franco of Spain. He recommended a body from Mulliner's of Chiswick who "had many satisfied customers among the more unpopular rulers of the world". A mission to Mulliner's of Army officers required glass one and three quarters of an inch thick, and armour plate. The large floor area required armour plate almost half an inch thick, and this would make the completed weight of the cars over three and a half tons which would overstress the wheels and gearbox on Spain's main roads. Some years later when holidaying there he inspected the cars; the brigadier in charge of the garage praised them and said they were used frequently. The speedometers only showed less than 2,000 km but "they were taken by train and only driven for the actual inspections and processions".

== Tanks and tank engines ==
In 1940 he was asked to concentrate on armoured fighting vehicles, and found the research facilities of the British motor-car industry "disappointingly meagre" apart from Vauxhall Motors (part of GM). In December 1940 Henry Spurrier of Leyland Motors and Robotham agreed British tanks were underpowered, and decided to develop at Belper a new tank engine based on the Rolls-Royce Merlin aero engine; to be called Meteor. The team at Clan Foundry, Belper (Note: over 300 by VE Day) included three of Spurrier's best designers, and also developed the Rolls-Royce B range engines. He wrote of the chaos in British armoured fighting vehicles as for twenty years between the wars as "the design and development of British tanks had been shamefully neglected ... with ill-informed criticism of the politicians, the kaleidoscopic changes in policy by the General Staff, and the relentless pressure for output regardless of quality".

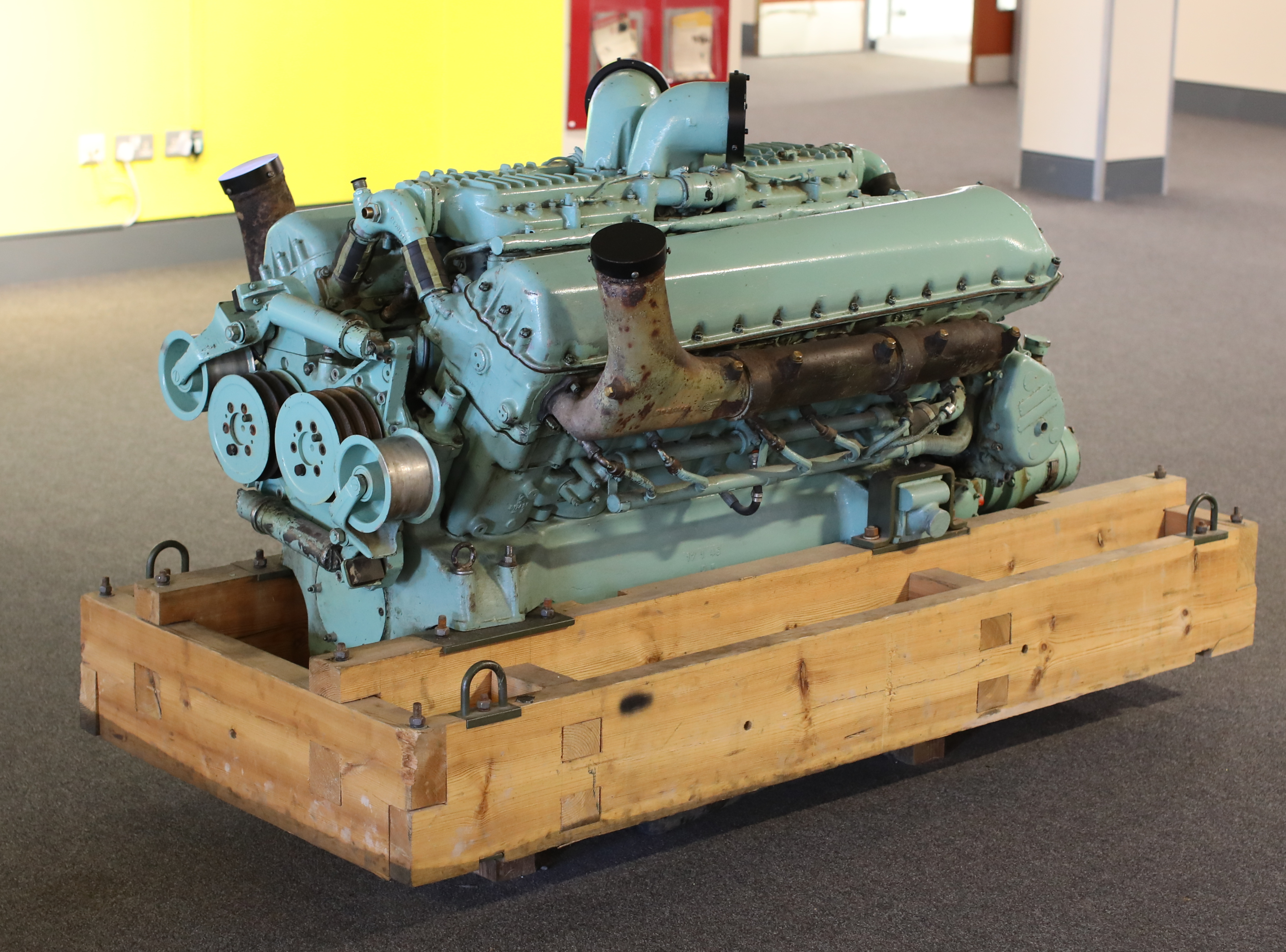
Rolls-Royce Meteor engine

In November 1941 he was appointed Chief Engineer of Tank Design in the Ministry of Supply by Beaverbrook (Note: In the Daily Mail, he was credited with designing the Silver Ghost, which first appeared when he was six.) despite his lack of experience in tank design. He continued to direct the Meteor design team at Belper. He found that the Tank Board had no experienced mechanical engineers and that the War Office General Staff had no clear conception of their requirements. Beaverbrook wanted output at any cost, and he once told the Beaver that they "had enough unreliable tanks to last the rest of the war!" He "stuck his toes in" and demanded sound products e.g. manganese steel castings for tank tracks as a broken track could be a death warrant for the crew. In the Ministry of Supply the answer to problems was to "shoot the messenger" and outsiders he was dealing with had the attitude that he would be gone tomorrow, so he resigned, leaving in August 1943 and returning to Belper. He thought (which turned out to be true) that any improvements would not reach the firing line before the end of the war.

== Postwar ==
By 1943 the Belper team had progressed a post-war range of 4, 6 and 8-cylinder car engines with parts in common. They had run many hundreds of thousands of miles in experimental cars, including the very fast but smooth Scalded Cat a Bentley with a 6-litre 8-cylinder engine and capable of over 100 mph, which Robotham liked for his commuting. The Duke of Edinburgh borrowed it for a week, and it was dismantled to avoid further requests. However following a 1948 request for a Rolls-Royce from the Crown (who usually chose Daimler cars) the Rolls-Royce Phantom IV was developed for Prince Philip and approved by him, to be privately owned. The Phantom IV was subsequently supplied to other royalty and heads of state.

Major-General Charles Dunphie (later chairman of Vickers) agreed it would be an ideal engine for a post-war replacement for the Universal Carrier, (Note: The Universal used a 4-litre 85 hp Ford flathead V8 engine.) though this project was dropped. But by 1948 it was clear that the Army would standardise on the Rolls-Royce B range engines for post-war combat vehicles. The eight-cylinder engine had too high fuel consumption for haulage work, but got a major market share where performance was important e.g. fire engines.

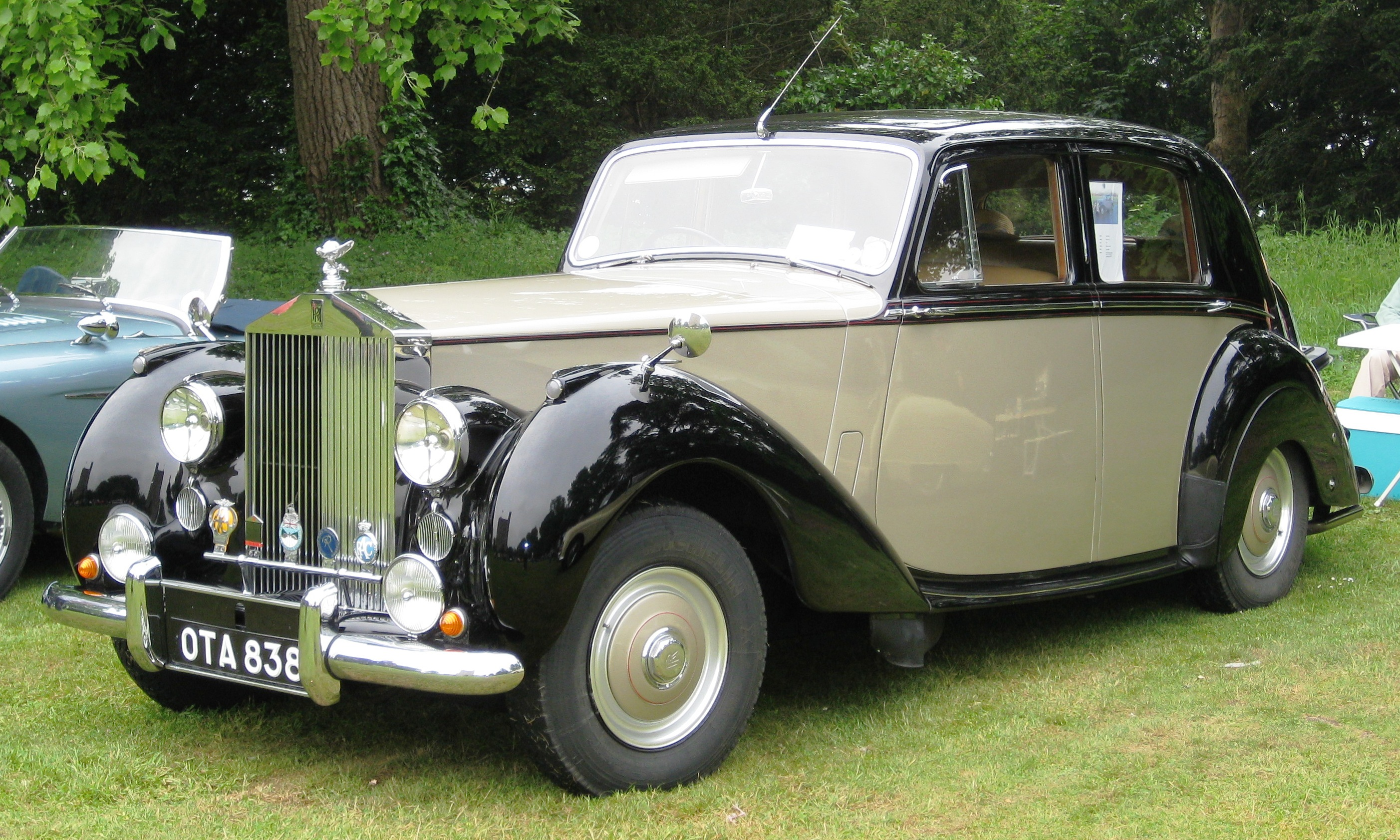
Standard Steel Rolls-Royce Silver Dawn with Pressed Steel pressings 1953

Robotham realised that post-war complete Rolls-Royce cars including bodies would be needed and should cost 30% less than a coach-built body, with the same body shell for Rolls-Royce and Bentley. He doubted if enough experienced tradesmen would be available to restart custom body building firms. After discussions with Spencer Wilks of Rover on the course to be followed, he went to the Pressed Steel Company in 1944 and asked whether they could make the tools for a body shell and the cost per shell; they were nonplussed at the small number of bodies required even though he stretched it to 2000 per year or a third above the total pre-war average. The tooling would cost at least £250,000 and would require production of at least 5,000 bodies. Hives agreed with a "fully tooled" body but when Arthur Sidgreaves heard of the cost he insisted on a full-scale mock-up for the Board. Some board members objected to sinking the headlamps into the wings, but changing the design might lose their place in the queue at Pressed Steel with perhaps twelve months delay. But the body shell would cost about half of what a post-war Park Ward body would cost, and as the surface of the pressings was so good less work would be required on them before painting. The body, used for the Rolls-Royce Silver Dawn and Bentley Mark VI, stayed in production for nine years and 6,500 bodies; a further 3,200 were made with an alteration increasing the size of the boot (luggage compartment; the Bentley R Type or later Silver Dawn). After VE day in May 1945 the Crewe factory went from Merlins to motor cars, and a body production line was created "from nothing". The first post-was car went to the Gaekwar of Baroda on 23 October 1946.

In 1945 he was disappointed when Dr Lewellen Smith who had been at the Glasgow factory was made managing director of the newly formed Motor Car Division and a member of the main board. Robotham was given the title of "Chief Engineer of Cars", his first title after 25 years. In 1949 he was appointed to the main board of Rolls-Royce Limited, to his surprise, and perhaps to convince Vickers they were giving top priority to supplying them with tractor diesel engines.

== Rolls-Royce Industrial engines ==
In 1947 a survey of the diesel market showed that there were no British lightweight engines in the 200 to 300 bhp range, a gap with the increasing size of trucks and the advent of diesel railcars which was to be filled by the new Rolls-Royce C range engines. The first engine ran in September 1948 and developed 190 bhp without supercharging, close to their target. Deciding most diesel engines were too heavy they (rashly) decided to use aluminium where possible, although the prototype light-alloy crank case had problems and they reverted to cast-iron. Then Hives became interested as Vickers-Armstrongs (the Vickers Viscount used Rolls-Royce engines) were proposing to enter the crawler tractor market in competition with Caterpillar; starting with the Vickers VR180 Vigor the largest machine in the range with a 190 bhp engine, and supercharged to give the optimum low speed "lugging" characteristics. So they had a customer, and by August 1949 parts were released for production. John Read was the division chief engineer at Belper.

The Diesel or Oil Engine Division was a new field for Rolls-Royce, and for Vickers. Unlike Rolls-Royce cars sold on the “magic of a name”, an engine would not pay more than a 10% premium above competitors like Cummins, Caterpillar, Deutz, G.M., International Harvester or Allis Chalmers; and price largely depends on volume. Initially the Diesel Division headquarters was at Derby. Jack Olding was the largest Caterpillar dealer in England, which they had relinquished to be the sales and service organisation for the new tractor throughout the world. So "the heat was on". Production tractors were shipped out all over the world (Africa, Australia, Canada, Ceylon, New Zealand and South America) before all the faults (few in the engines; they fitted a device that prevented the clutch being slipped while the engine was running fast) had been fixed. Vickers had the expense of flying heavy replacement parts to remote corners of the earth. Like a tank the crawler tractor engine does not work hard all the time, and the need is to keep the dirt out.

Robotham did not want to have only one customer for the division, although Hives thought he should have concentrated on Vickers. Other potential customers were Scammel, Petbow (generating sets), and Vospers and Trinity House (marine engines), but most of their production went to Vickers. Big engine components were made 200 miles away in Glasgow. By 1957 they were supplying parts to over 100 countries. Then Vickers decided to stop making tractors after making about a thousand tractors, and the Odling worldwide service organisation disappeared. Rolls-Royce diesel output was low, and of short runs of over 50 varieties of power unit. He discussed with Sir Percy Lister a merger with Listers, who had a quality product, with a complementary range of engines below 100 hp, some larger slow-speed engines and similar problems of service and spare parts worldwide. The chairman agreed, but the board were against further diversification or going into truck manufacture.

So Robotham was left with the rail and marine fields. Rail was losing ground to road, and they were engineering railcar applications which required much design work for a small volume of orders. For marine generator applications shipbuilding firms favoured larger slow-speed engines. He eventually got, via John Vestey and his Blue Star Line, some higher-speed marine generating sets installed, although there were problem on one of their ships when the R-R engine was connected to the fuel lines of the heavy oil used for the main engines.

Then Hives asked Robotham whether he wanted to move to the Motor Car Division at Crewe or develop diesel engines for Vickers. Belper was to close down as it was isolated from Crewe 50 miles away, and more factory floor space would be required. The (profitable) B range petrol engines were to be made at Crewe as they had much (e.g. major components) in common with the car engines. In 1958 the Sentinel Waggon Works at Shrewsbury was taken over by Rolls-Royce Limited for the manufacture of their range of diesel industrial engines, so that the factory at Derby could concentrate on aero engines. The factory which manufactured steam and later diesel locomotives had come on the market in 1956; a large factory employing 2,000 people and with room to spare for the Diesel (Oil Engine) Division.

But he had not run a large works, and did not realise that the firm were losing money with steam locomotives and machine tools about which he knew nothing – so the firm "really had no viable product whatever". Their range of diesel engines suited the Sentinel range of diesel shunting locomotives, and after trying to reduce weight of the product, the problem in his last four years in the industry was to get enough weight in the available space to produce enough grip on the rails! Some equipment to machine large castings was moved from the Glasgow factory. He found the Sentinel staff were demoralised with frequent changes in policy and management since 1946, so put money into items like a new welfare hall on the sports ground and purchasing a stretch of salmon fishing river on the Severn a mile from the factory which had been rented by the works fishing club for several years; to improve the espirit de corps (he and directors played in the cricket team for interdepartmental matches!). In 1962 the Meteor was superseded for new tanks, but the British government enquired about spare parts. As the Land Rover was so successful and Rover wanted more manufacturing capacity, they transferred the manufacture of Meteor spare parts back to Rolls-Royce, a welcome addition at Shrewsbury. By 1969 Rolls-Royce at Shrewsbury had a seven-figure unfulfilled order for Meteor spares from the British and other governments. His farewell retirement party was at Shrewsbury in January 1963.

== Personal ==
He was from Derby, where Rolls-Royce was a major employer, where his father and grandfather were solicitors and where his grandfather had built two streets of Victorian houses. From a remark he made about wine, Henry Royce referred to him as "the gentleman who likes wine" and usually produced something drinkable at lunch.

His surname was generally pronounced as if it was spelt "Robottom", and he gave up trying to convince people otherwise. He was known at Rolls-Royce by the abbreviation "Rm".

His parents paid £250 for him to be indentured as a "premium apprentice" to Rolls-Royce for four years. Most of them had joined direct from a public school, but Robotham had attended Repton School (where his form-master was Mr Snape) and then spent nine months in 1918 training for a commission in the artillery at Lydd Camp, Dungeness. Although he was not gazetted out of the Army for six months after Armistice Day, he got leave to look for a career. His brother went to Shrewsbury School.

He married Winifred, a daughter of Henry Thompson (a Phantom I owner), in 1928/29. The couple's son and daughter were born in 1926 and 1929. His second marriage, in 1946, was to Jeanne Ekins a pianist, who had accompanied the famous tenor Gigli. While working at Derby they lived in nearby Etwall.

He bought a farm of 300 acres in Engeham, Kent for a retirement career in June 1945, with advice from his brother-in-law Jack Thompson. He harvested corn, clover seed, potatoes, hops (hops were regulated and profitable), and fruit (apples, plums and greengages). By 1970 the annual fruit harvest (apples and pears) was over 100 tons.
