= Lord Black =

Lord Black may refer to:

- William Black, Baron Black (1893–1984), British automotive executive
- Conrad Black, Baron Black of Crossharbour (born 1944), Canadian-born British newspaper publisher
- Guy Black, Baron Black of Brentwood (born 1964), Deputy Chairman of the Telegraph Media Group
