= William Black, Baron Black =

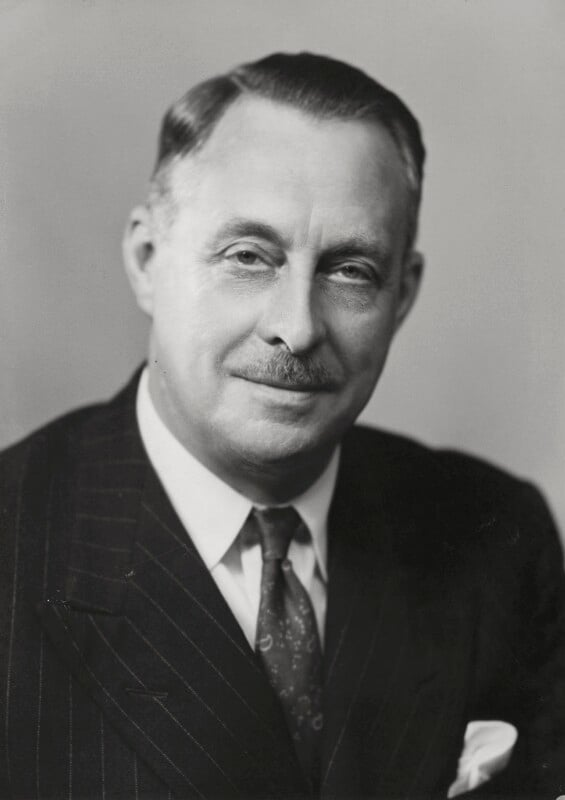
Black in 1953

William Rushton Black, Baron Black (12 January 1893 – 27 December 1984) was a coachbuilder born in Barrow-in-Furness, Cumbria on 12 January 1893.

After education at Barrow Secondary school and Barrow Technical College he was apprenticed as an engineer to Vickers Ltd in 1908. By 1924 he had risen to become the Works Manager at Vickers Crayford Factory. In 1928 he was appointed general manager of Weymann motor bodies following their restructuring. In 1934 he moved to Park Royal Vehicles who offered him a seat on the board as well as the general managership. He was appointed managing director of Park Royal in 1939. In 1946 he started negotiations with Charles H Roe which led to PRV taking over the Leeds coachbuilding business, and it was 'Bill' Black who secured the merger of Park Royal-Roe with AEC, giving the ACV group some in-house bodybuilding capacity for the first time. During his managing directorship of PRV the AEC Routemaster, Bridgemaster and Monocoach integral designs were produced as well as body-on-chassis models and key members of staff were recruited from Bristol Commercial Vehicles and Eastern Coach Works.

He became a director of Associated Commercial Vehicles in 1949 and managing director in 1958, in the 1958 Birthday Honours Black received a knighthood. having the honour conferred by the Duke of Edinburgh on 14 July 1958. After the death Of Sir Henry Spurrier he became chairman of Leyland Motor Corporation in 1963. He retired from this post in 1966 after which Donald Stokes became chairman and Chief Executive of LMC. He was created Baron Black, of Barrow in Furness in the County Palatine of Lancaster on 21 June 1968.

Lord Black died on 27 December 1984.

== Coat of arms ==
Coat of arms of William Black, Baron Black
Crest On a chapean Gules turned up Ermine a sedan chair Or. Escutcheon Gules two wheels in fess a four-bladed propeller in base and on a chief Or a rose Gules barbed and seeded between two bees volant Proper. Supporters Dexter a basset hound, sinister a rhesus monkey, both Proper. Motto Per Ardua

His coat of arms are a curiosity, since he was allowed by the heraldic authority to include his dog Fred and the monkey Bimbo. Fred had often escaped from the castle and ran to the nearby Chessington Zoo in Surrey, where he was regularly collected by the chauffeur in the Rolls-Royce of Lord Black. In the same zoo, of which Lord Black was one of the directors, the monkey Bimbo had escaped once and was only caught after a lengthy hunt. The baron was thankful for the publicity, and concluded that it would be a nice idea to include the pair of animals in his coat of arms.
