= King Alfred Motor Services =

English bus and coach operator, 1920–1973

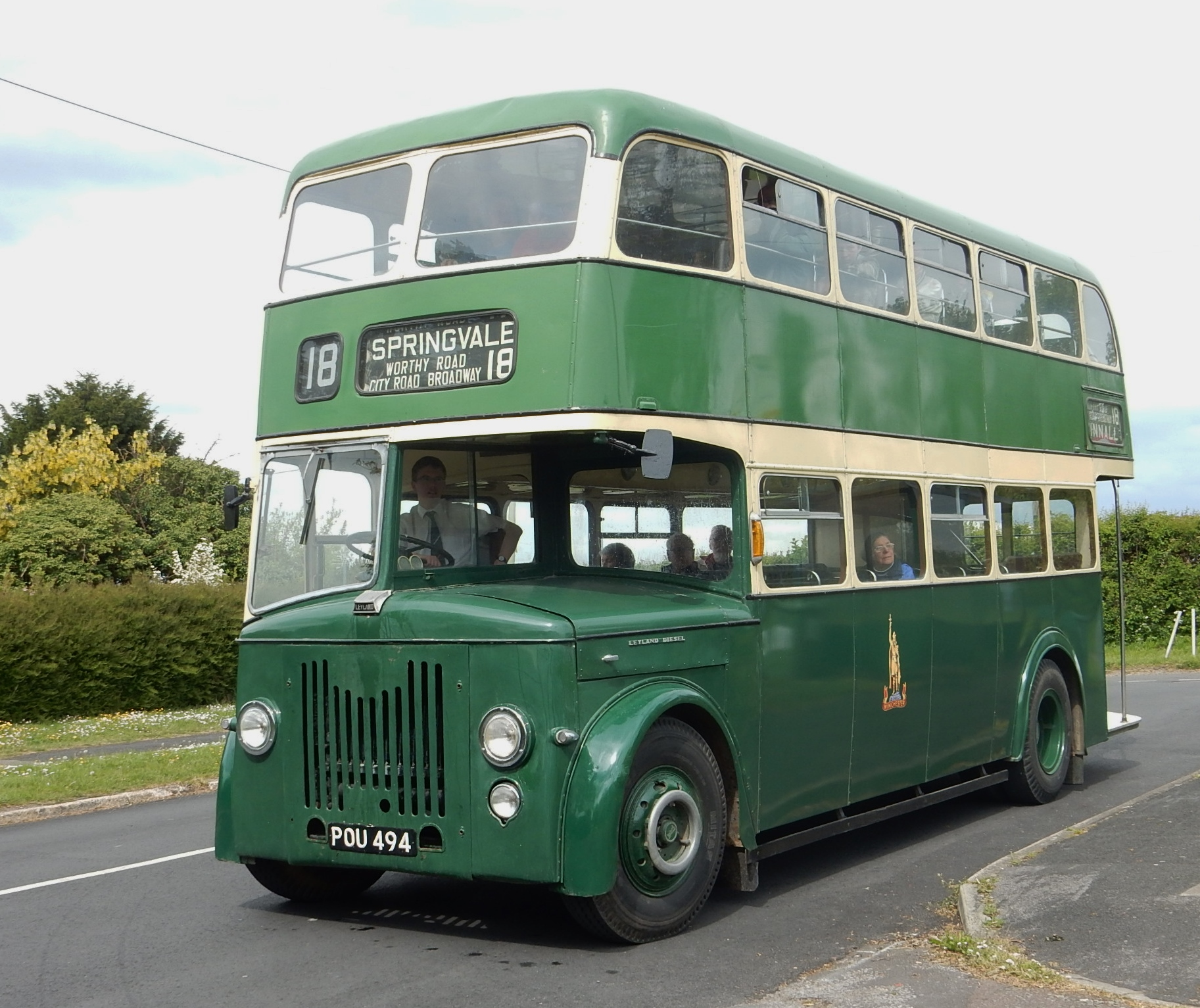
- Preserved 1956 Leyland Titan
- Founded: May 1920; 105 years ago
- Ceased operation: April 1973; 52 years ago
- Headquarters: Winchester
- Service area: Hampshire
- Service type: Bus and coach operator

King Alfred Motor Services was a bus and coach operator based in Winchester, England, between 1920 and 1973.

== Origins ==
King Alfred Motor Services was founded by a Winchester entrepreneur named Robert Chisnell, who had many business interests in Winchester, including tobacconist shops, cafes and later a garage business. His first involvement with passenger transport was in 1915, using a variety of small motor vehicles to transport troops to and from various camps in the Winchester area. As well as a range of cars, he acquired three Delaunay-Bellevilles and a Napier, which were converted to carry up to 12 passengers each for this purpose

== Pre-World War 2 ==
After the end of World War 1, a large number of surplus trucks became available, and Robert Chisnell acquired two ex-RAF Leylands, to which he had charabanc bodies fitted, with a 'King Alfred' fleetname painted on the rear. The first excursion was on Whit Monday, 24 May 1920; the destination is believed to have been Bournemouth. The first regular bus services began on 9 October 1922, serving the new council estate at Stanmore via two circular routes, together with other routes to Compton, Shawford, Twyford and Flowerdown

Through the remainder of the decade, King Alfred Motor Services continued to expand, both in the size of the fleet and in the area covered. In May 1928 an express coach service to London started operation, although this only ran for less than four years.

By the early 1930s, the King Alfred fleet included vehicles based on Leyland, Thornycroft, Dennis, Albion and Commer chassis. The network continued to expand, with improved frequencies on many routes. The 1930 Road Traffic Act reduced competition on many routes, although the western routes to Stockbridge and King's Somborne continued to be disputed with other competing operators for many more years. By 1939, R. Chisnell & Sons Ltd (as the company had now become) had an up to date fleet of vehicles and was established as the principle operator in the Winchester area.

== World War 2 ==
In common with many other bus operators, World War 2 brought many difficulties, including shortages of fuel, rubber, buses and staff. Five vehicles were requisitioned by the War Department (of which only one later returned). However, the increased number of passengers, including servicemen, evacuees, and war workers meant that King Alfred was able to purchase several replacement vehicles. The first of these, in May 1942, was King Alfred's first double decker, a Leyland Titan TD7. This was followed by several other Ministry of Supply specification "Utility" buses during the remainder of the wartime years.

Robert Chisnell, died shortly before the end of World War 2, on 5 June 1945. The business remained within the Chisnell family, as the founder's two sons continued to run the company.

== Post-WW2 ==
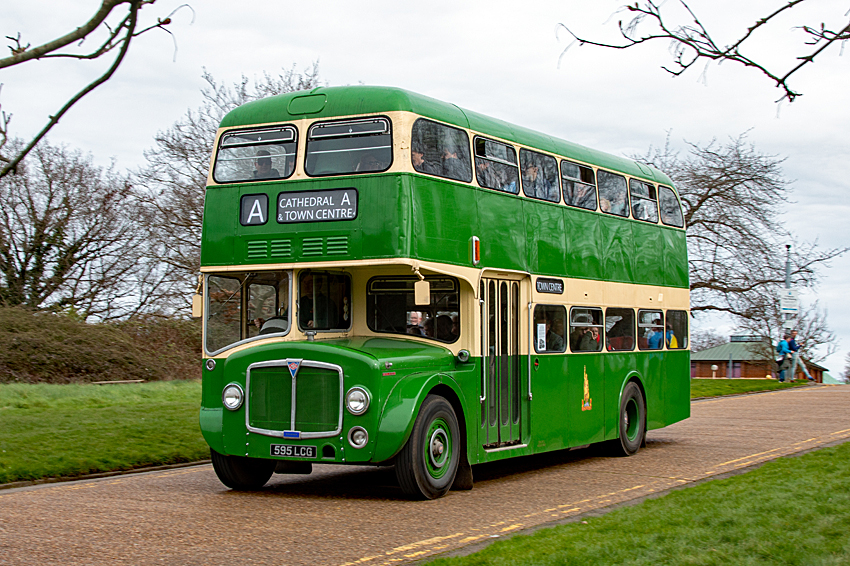
AEC Renown at Guildford Cathedral

Starting from 1947, King Alfred Motor Services were able to continue replacement of some of the older vehicles in the fleet, with the arrival of four Leyland Titan PD1A double deckers. For the following ten years, virtually all new vehicle purchases were from Leyland, with the exception of two Bedford OBs in 1947, and two Albion Valkyries in 1950. Amongst the Leylands was a 1950 Olympic HR40, which was the first underfloor engined single deck bus vehicle purchased by any Hampshire operator. It was followed a year later by the company's first underfloor engined coach, a Leyland Royal Tiger.

By the early 1950s, King Alfred was still providing an extensive service across the Winchester area. However, as the 1950s progressed, an increase in traffic congestion in Winchester, a reduction in passengers, and staff shortages became increasing challenges (and ones which King Alfred Motor Services continued to face for the remainder of its existence).

High capacity, low height double deckers joined the fleet. These were initially AEC Bridgemasters, moving on to AEC Renowns and Leyland Atlanteans. New single deckers were introduced bringing the 36-footer to the streets of Winchester in 1962. This policy continued right through to 1971 when King Alfred became the first operator to purchase a batch of Metro-Scania single deckers.

The combined problems of traffic congestion and staff shortages, with the two Chisnell brothers approaching retirement age, eventually led to the end of King Alfred Motor Services. The final services ran on Saturday 28 April 1973, with the services and many of the vehicles being taken over by Hants & Dorset.

== Preservation ==
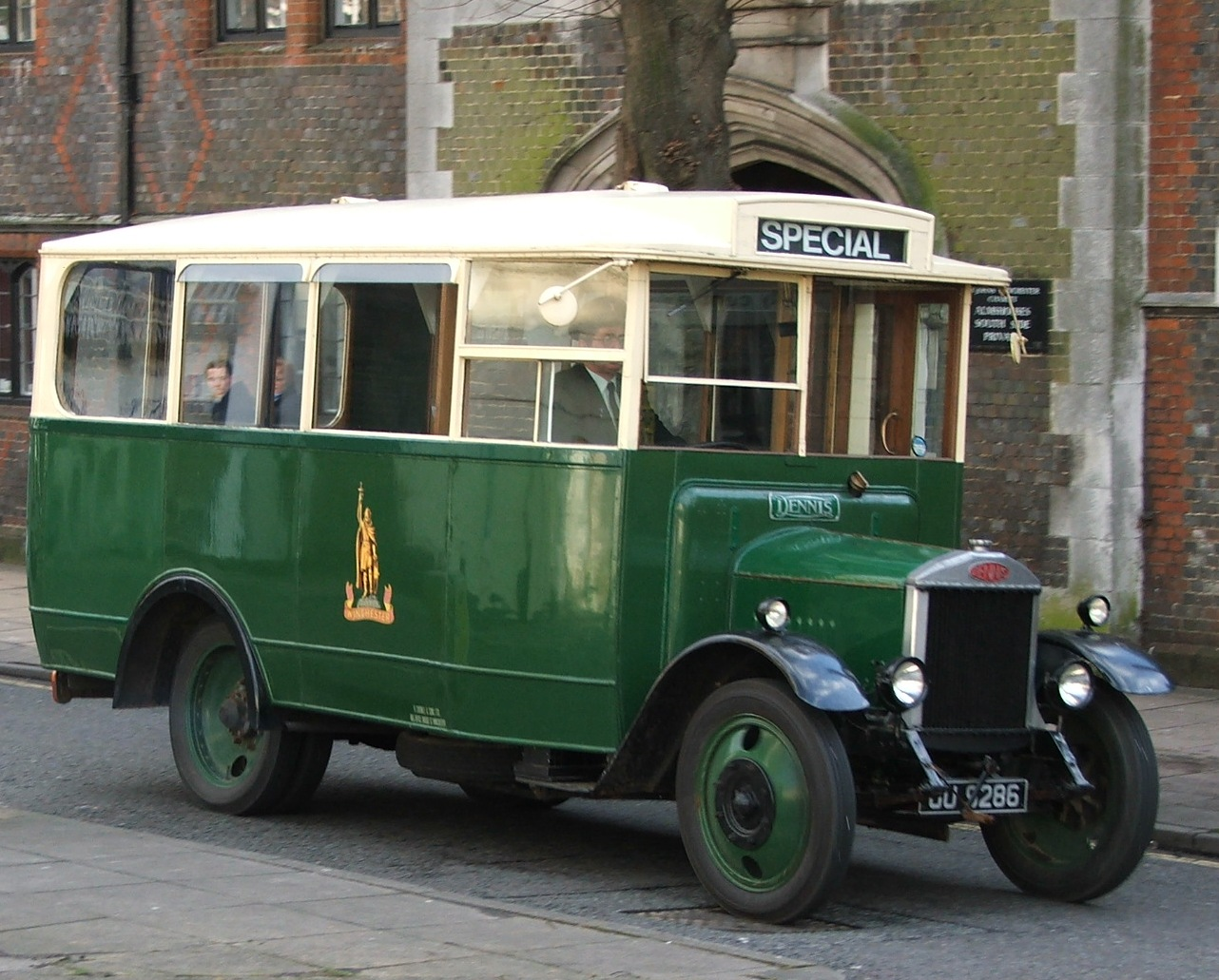
1931 Dennis, preserved by the Friends of King Alfred Buses

Thirteen former King Alfred vehicles have been preserved by a local charity, the "Friends of King Alfred Buses". These range from a 1931 Dennis and 1935 Albion as the earliest, to a pair of 1970 Leyland Panthers as the newest, and the collection includes both buses and coaches. The vehicles, several of which have been returned from overseas and restored from almost derelict condition, are often seen at local events and rallies.

In 2023, a 1929 Leyland Lion was added to the collection. Although this is not an ex-King Alfred vehicle (originating from the local fleet of Hants & Dorset), it is almost identical to a vehicle from the King Alfred fleet and has been repainted in their livery. Similarly, a Leyland Titan PD2 has been restored to represent similar vehicles once operated by King Alfred, but which were subsequently scrapped.

Notable within the fleet was the single aforementioned Leyland Olympic HR40, which had been rescued from a field in Ireland and had undergone a lengthy restoration by volunteers. However, this vehicle was severely damaged by fire at its storage base in December 2023
