= Hants & Dorset =

British bus and coach operator

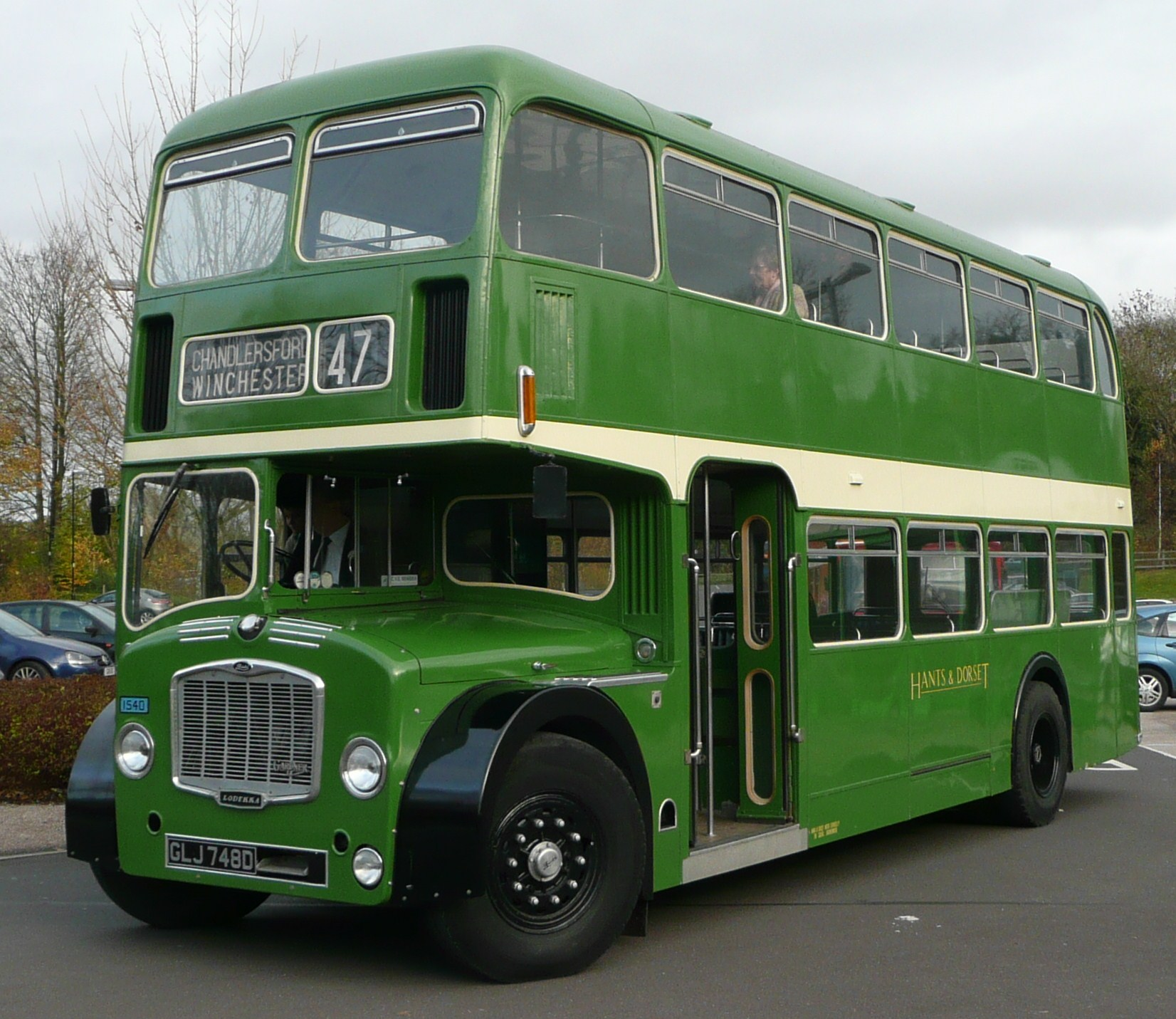
- Preserved Bristol Lodekka in November 2008
- Parent: Southern Railway (1929-48); British Automobile Traction (1929-48); Tilling Group (1929-42); British Associated Transport (1948-62); Transport Holding Company (1963-68); National Bus Company (1969-83)
- Founded: 1920
- Ceased operation: 1983
- Service area: Bournemouth; Fareham; Lymington; Poole; Southampton; Winchester
- Service type: Bus operator
- Depots: 14

Hants & Dorset Motor Services Ltd was a stage carriage bus service operator in southern England between 1920 and 1983.

== Early history ==
In 1916, the British Automobile Traction Company Limited (a subsidiary of the British Electric Traction Company) and others formed the Bournemouth & District Motor Services Limited. Following the purchase of Trade Cars of Southampton in 1920, the Hants & Dorset Motor Services Ltd name was adopted. In that same year, the Tilling Group bought an interest in the company and from that year until 1929 Hants & Dorset grew rapidly.

In 1929, the Southern Railway took up its option to buy shares, under the terms of the Road & Rail Transport Act 1928, when the four railway companies were able to invest in bus operators.

By the late 1920s and early 1930s, the network of Hants & Dorset bus services was largely complete. Hants & Dorset operated buses in an area approximately bounded by Bournemouth, Poole, Southampton, Lymington, Fareham and Winchester. Hants & Dorset replaced the trams operated by Poole Corporation in 1935.

== Nationalisation ==
The Southern Railway's half-share in Hants & Dorset passed to the government-owned British Transport Commission when the railway company was nationalised in 1948, which then passed to the Transport Holding Company (THC) in 1963. British Automobile Traction sold its shares to the Tilling Group in 1942, who in turn sold out to British Associated Transport in 1949, and thus Hants & Dorset became 100% government owned.

=== Common management and merger ===
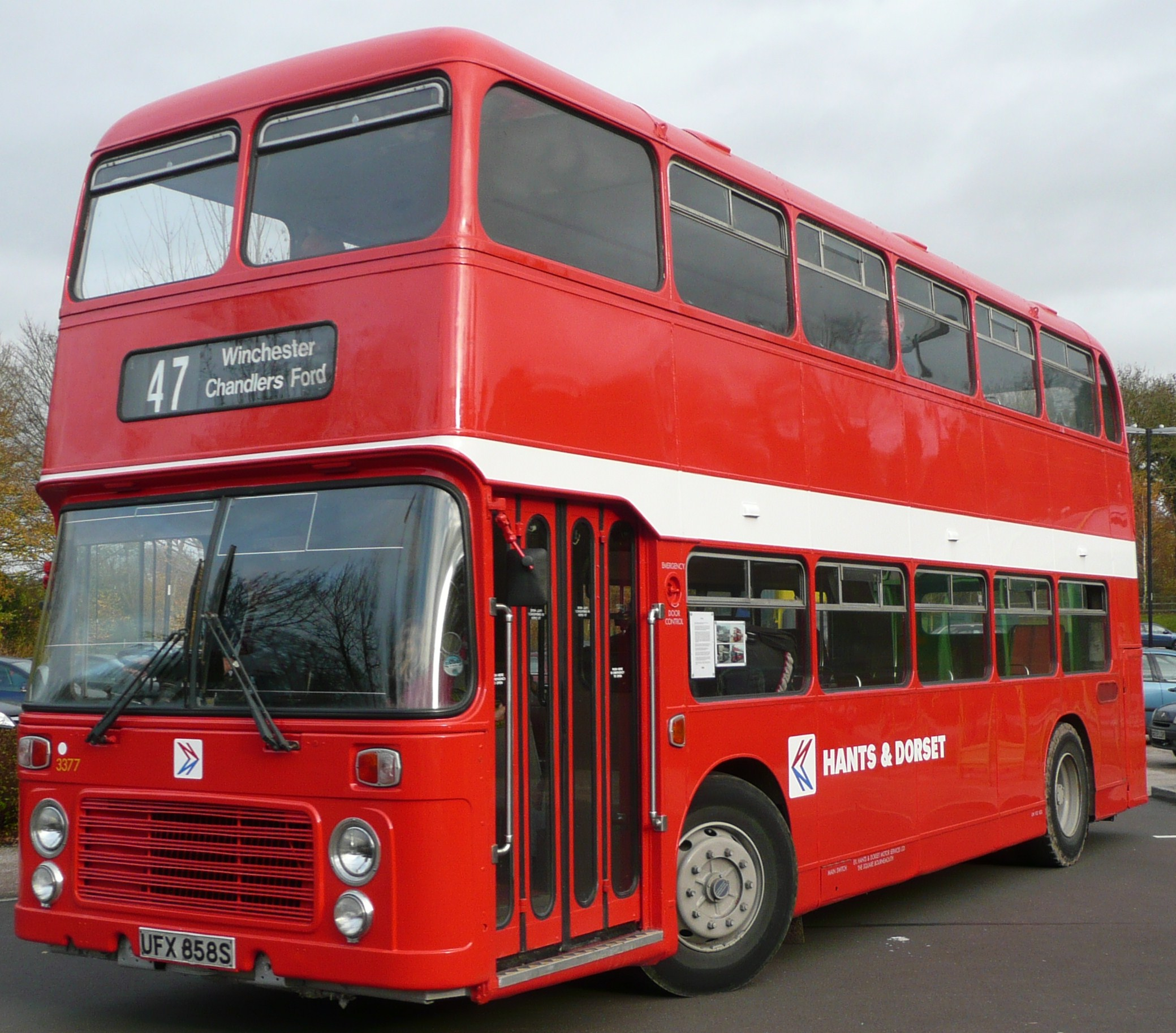
Preserved Bristol VR in the poppy red livery in Winchester in November 2008

The THC's successor inspired a reorganisation in 1964 that saw Hants & Dorset and northern neighbour Wilts & Dorset fall under common management, at Hants & Dorset’s head office in Bournemouth.

A year earlier, Wilts & Dorset had taken over a large independent, Silver Star of Porton Down. As part of the THC’s early rationalisation, Wilts & Dorset had previously, in 1950, taken over the Basingstoke operator Venture, which had passed to the Red & White group five years earlier and which, following Red & White’s voluntary nationalisation, had in turn passed to the THC.

Upon both Hants & Dorset and Wilts & Dorset passing to the National Bus Company (NBC) on 1 January 1969, as a result of the Transport Act 1968, the operators merged in 1972 under the Hants & Dorset name and management. Rather than Hants & Dorset's green, the enlarged operation adopted a fleet livery of National poppy red, similar to Wilts & Dorset's. The new operation covered routes from Pewsey in the north, Poole to Fareham in the south, Basingstoke in the east, and Shaftesbury and Warminster in the west.

A year later, the substantial Winchester operator R Chisnell & Sons (t/a King Alfred) passed to Hants & Dorset, along with an eclectic mix of vehicles, most of which were withdrawn from service as non-standard. Chisnell had operated Winchester city services and a country service to Basingstoke.

Hants & Dorset took over the services operated by Western National in Swanage in 1974.

Hants & Dorset had a reputation among NBC subsidiaries as somewhat loss-making. While routes in the Poole-Bournemouth, Southampton, Basingstoke and Salisbury areas made reasonable returns, those elsewhere were weaker. The impact of the private car throughout the 1960s and 1970s together with successive withdrawals and fares revisions further weakened what had now become marginal rural services. During the 1980s, Hants & Dorset's financial position was so precarious that it had to be propped up by an inter-company loan from fellow NBC subsidiary Amalgamated Passenger Transport Ltd in order to remain solvent.

=== Provincial ===
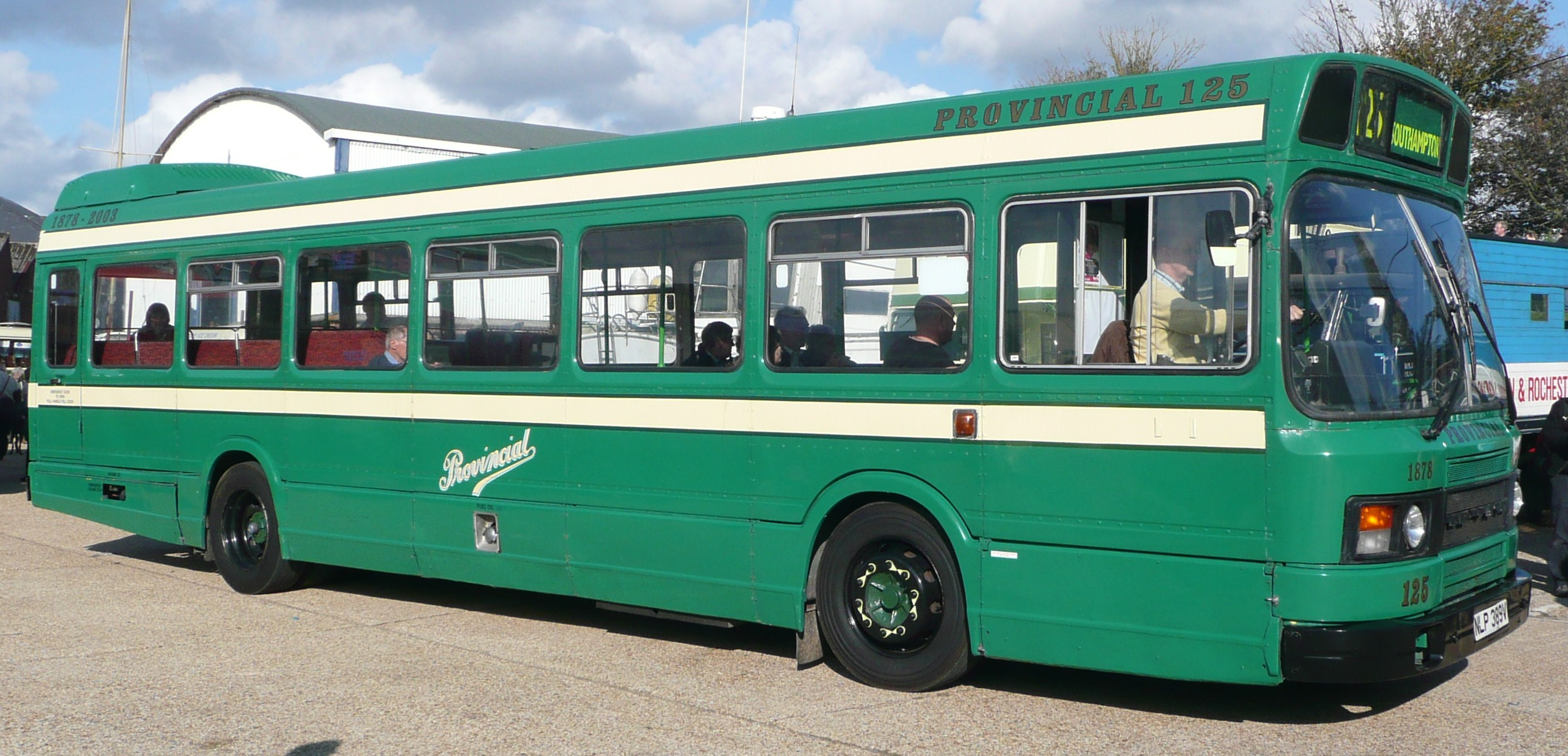
Preserved Leyland National in Provincial livery in October 2008

NBC acquired the Gosport & Fareham Omnibus Co (trading as Provincial) in 1970. It passed under the head office control of Hants & Dorset but Provincial remained a separate entity, in part under its own control, owing to the terms of a 1929 Act under which it was established. Provincial retained a green livery.

=== Market analysis ===
In the late 1970s and early 1980s, in order to match supply and demand without undue cross subsidy, Hants & Dorset like other NBC subsidiaries embarked on a number of market analysis projects. These helped identify viable networks where the local authorities concerned, which by now not only had the power to subsidise bus services but were actually facing resultant financial constraints, could subsidise additional mileage.

MAP, as it was known, emerged from the Midland Red company in 1977 and was applied throughout Hants & Dorset's territory, culminating in redrafted timetables and an attempt at fostering local support through the use of sub-brands identifiable to specific, local markets. These were:

South Wessex (Poole, Bournemouth and Lymington)
Wiltsway (Salisbury and surrounding areas)
Winton Line (Winchester)
Venture (Basingstoke)
South Hants (Southampton)
New Provincial or Provincial Joint Services (Hants & Dorset Fareham and Gosport & Fareham operations)

== Depots ==
At its height, Hants & Dorset operated from garages at Andover, Basingstoke, Blandford Forum, Bournemouth, Eastleigh, Fareham, Lymington, Pewsey, Poole, Ringwood, Salisbury, Southampton, Swanage and Winchester.

== End of the road ==
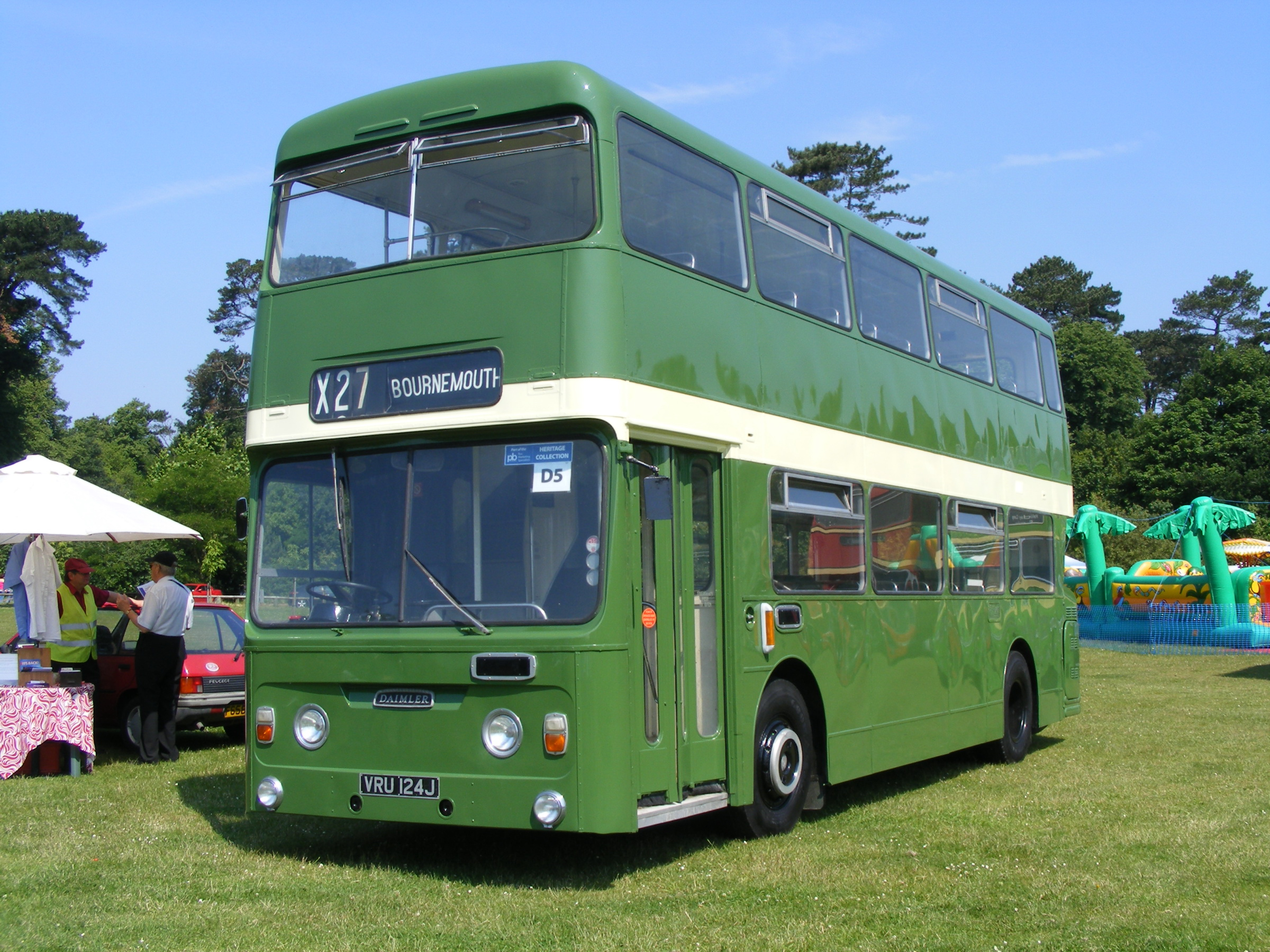
Preserved Hants & Dorset Daimler Fleetline in June 2008

In the early- to mid-1980s, the National Bus Company, with an eye to the future, began dismantling its larger operating subsidiaries, of which Hants & Dorset was one. The goal was the formation of units that could better serve their local markets, although later splits were to ensure a successful privatisation.

So on 1 April 1983, Hants & Dorset Motor Services was divided into three operating companies: Wilts & Dorset, Provincial and Hampshire Bus.

There re-emerged the name Wilts & Dorset, albeit with a significantly different operating area from that of the old company (from 1983, covering Bournemouth, Poole, Lymington, Salisbury, with a head office remaining at Bournemouth). Wilts & Dorset was sold to its management in 1987 and bought by the Go-Ahead Group in August 2003.

Recognizing the increasing level of joint working, Hants & Dorset's Fareham activities merged with the Gosport and Fareham undertaking, under the Provincial name, trading from Hoeford, Gosport Road, Fareham, and all but closing the former Hants & Dorset Fareham garage other than for storage. Provincial was acquired by FirstGroup as First Provincial, then merged into First Hampshire & Dorset in 2003.

Finally, the former Hants & Dorset operations in Basingstoke, Winchester and Southampton became Hampshire Bus, whose head office was in Eastleigh. Of the three, Hampshire Bus was the weakest, yet this was one of the first companies to sell under the privatisation of the National Bus Company, in April 1987. It was acquired by Stagecoach, but in October 1987 Stagecoach sold the Southampton area operations to Solent Blue Line (itself acquired by the Go-Ahead Group in July 2005). Stagecoach retains the Winchester, Andover and Basingstoke operations.

== Trivia ==
- The Hants & Dorset company was affectionately known as "Pants & Corset".
- The company operated from the higher level of a unique two-tier bus & coach station in Bournemouth, dating from 1930. Having been rebuilt in the 1950s, it was rendered unsafe following a fire in 1976, and demolished and replaced with a car park in the early 1980s.

== See also ==
- List of bus operators of the United Kingdom
