= Jack Olding =

British businessman

Jack Olding of Hatfield, Hertfordshire, England had a company (Jack Olding & Co. Ltd), which specialised in the import and modification of tanks and tractors during the Second World War (notably being the sole importer into the UK of Caterpillars). Before this Jack had several prestige Car Dealerships in Mayfair and other London locations.

He had a factory on the A1 just to the north of Hatfield, at a site now known as either Oldings Corner or Caterpillar Island.

In 1935, Fred Myers, already the sole UK importer for Caterpillar machines, under the banner of H. Leverton & Co. Ltd., forged an alliance with his friend Jack Olding in agreement with Caterpillar USA, to split the UK Caterpillar Dealerships in two throughout England and Wales. Fred and Jack also formed a joint company, L.O. Tractors, which looked after Scotland. After the war, partly because of government pressure caused by a shortage of dollars, he made an ultimately unsuccessful gamble by relinquishing the Caterpillar agency for what proved to be the less than successful bid, having been offered Worldwide Rights to the new Vickers Vigor tractor. Indeed, the company is recognized as the only Caterpillar dealer to voluntarily give up the franchise. They were also distributors for the Opperman Motocart. From 1936 to 1950, they also distributed John Deere Tractors and Farm Equipment.

W. A. Robotham of Rolls-Royce recalls him as a "great sportsman, a charming host and an able administrator" with his main hobbies "racing" (he ran horses in the Grand National), "shooting and playing games of chance"; but he was an unlucky punter, and Robotham learned not to follow his racing tips. The Vickers tractor used a Rolls-Royce engine, and Oldings set up a worldwide service organisation for the tractor. But Vickers-Armstrongs had to fly urgently needed tractor parts around the world at great expense, and stopped production after making about a thousand tractors.

On his death, the company passed to Scottish Land Development and became known as SLD Olding.

Jack Olding's real name was Henry John Douglas Olding.

== See also ==
- List of Road Junctions in the United Kingdom
- Hobart's Funnies
