= AEC Renown =

Bus manufactured by AEC (1925-1967)

The AEC Renown was the name given to three distinct forward control bus chassis manufactured by the Associated Equipment Company (AEC) at different periods between 1925 and 1967. All were of the front-engine, rear-wheel-drive layout. The first and third types had two axles, the second had three. Each was intended to be fitted with bodywork by an outside coachbuilder – single deck for the first type, double deck for the third, whilst the second could be bodied in either form.

== Models 411 and 413 (1925–1926) ==
The first AEC bus chassis to be given the name Renown – in fact, the first AEC chassis of any kind to be named – was the Model 411, introduced in March 1925. This was a two-axle chassis intended to be fitted with a single-deck body with a capacity of around thirty seats. It had a 5.1-litre (310 cu in) four-cylinder side-valve petrol engine, the basic design of which dated back to 1919.

The chassis was designed to meet new regulations which permitted a motor vehicle to run at 20 mph (32 km/h) instead of 12 mph (19 km/h), provided that pneumatic tyres were fitted and the weight did not exceed 3 long tons 15 hundredweight (3,800 kg). Previous AEC bus chassis had used solid tyres.

The model 413 Renown was a variant of the model 411 introduced later in 1925, having a modified braking system. Models 411 and 413, taken together, numbered 405 vehicles; they were produced until 1926. The AEC Blenheim (models 412 and 414) produced at the same time as the Renown was similar to the Renown but of normal-control layout (having the driving position behind the engine).

== Models 663 and 664 (1929–1940) ==
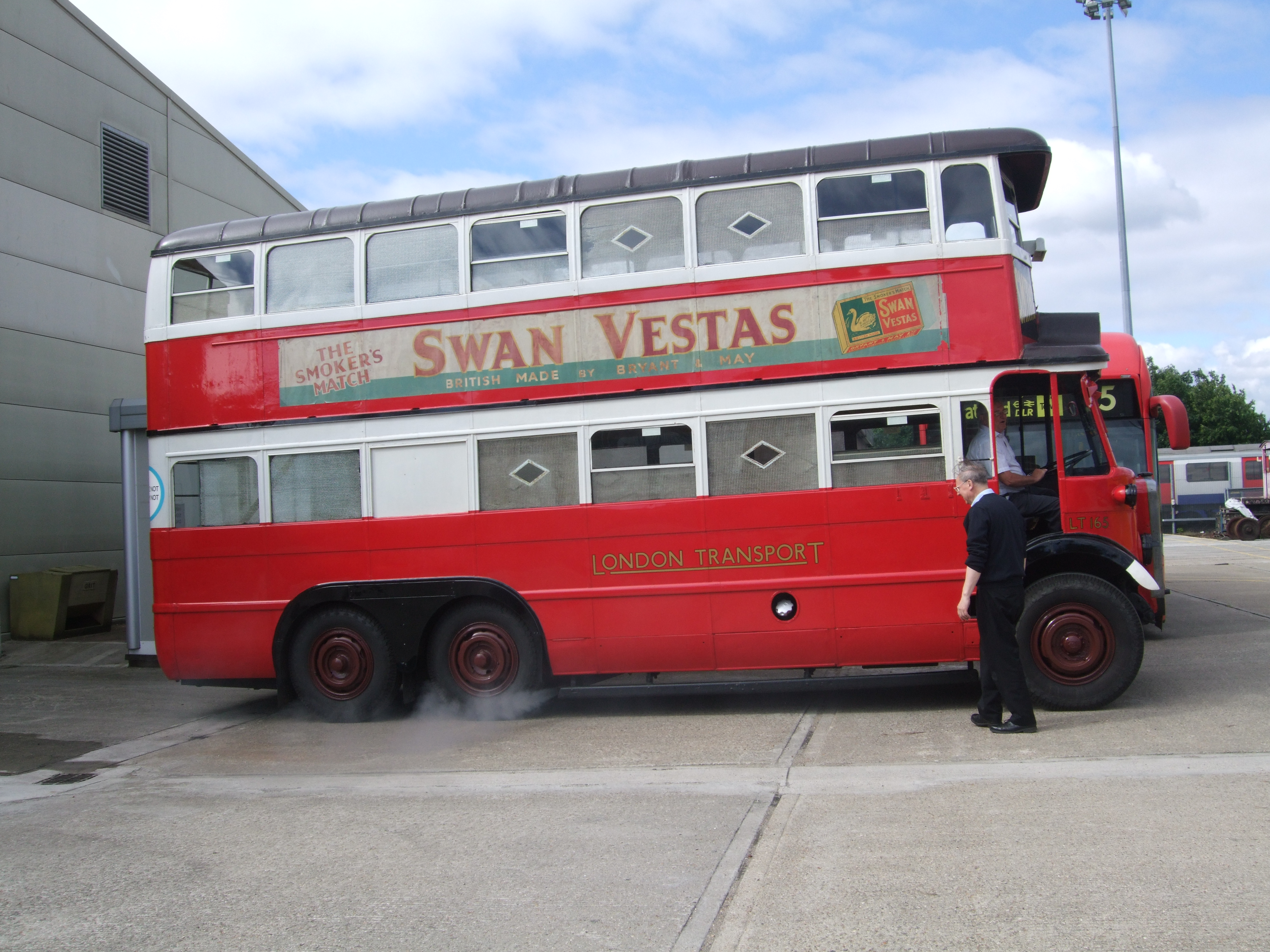
London Transport no. LT165 is a Model 663 Renown

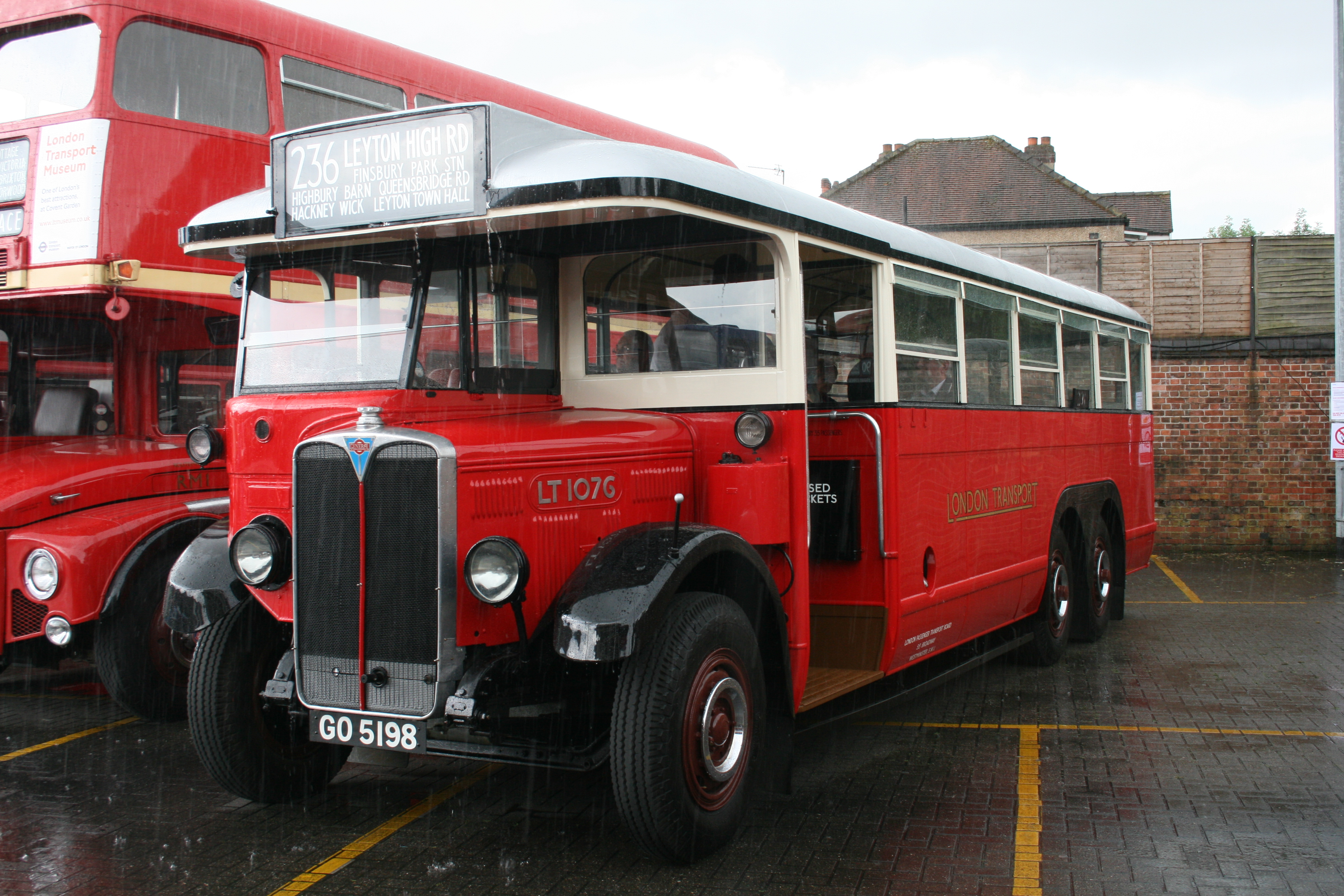
London Transport no. LT1076 is a Model 664 Renown

In 1925–26, manufacturers such as Guy and Karrier introduced bus chassis designed to take advantage of regulations that permitted a bus to have a greater length and gross weight, and thus a greater seating capacity, provided that the chassis had three axles instead of two. In these designs, the third axle was at the rear, and both rear axles were powered.

AEC entered the market for six-wheel (three-axle) double-deck buses in 1927, with Model 802; they had petrol engines, of either AEC or Daimler manufacture, and pneumatic tyres. Twenty were built, of which twelve were sold to the London General Omnibus Company (LGOC), where they formed the LS Class, or "London Six" – these comprised eleven double-deckers (with various seating capacities between 66 and 72) and one single-decker. Most of the rest were used as demonstrators, but with no orders from outside the LGOC, the model was dropped in 1928. The LGOC used the LS Class on Route 16 (Victoria – Cricklewood), as this was the only route that the Metropolitan Police would sanction them for, owing to their great length – 29 feet 11 inches (9.12 m), compared to the 25 feet (7.6 m) of the two-axle NS Class, which they shared the route with. Inherited by the London Passenger Transport Board (LPTB) in 1933, the last of the LS Class were withdrawn from passenger service during 1937.

A new six-cylinder 6.1-litre (370 cu in) overhead-camshaft petrol engine was introduced by AEC in 1929, and fitted to several new models introduced that year. Two of these – models 663 and 664 – were given the name Renown; the others included the Model 660 Reliance, Model 661 Regent and Model 662 Regal. As with Model 802, the Renown had six wheels on three axles, the four rear wheels being powered. Broadly similar to each other, the primary difference between the two Renown models was in the wheelbase and length – Model 663 had a wheelbase of 16 feet 6 inches (5.03 m) for an overall length of 26 feet (7.9 m), Model 664 had a wheelbase of 18 feet 7 inches (5.66 m) and was 30 feet (9.1 m) long – this was the maximum permitted length for a three-axle bus at the time, two-axle buses being restricted to 25 ft (7.6 m). (Note: Increased to 26 ft (7.9 m) for double-deckers and 27 ft 6 in (8.38 m) for single-deckers by the Road Traffic Act 1930, three-axle buses remaining at 30 ft (9.1 m)) When fitted with double-deck bodywork, Model 663 could carry up to 60 seated passengers (34 upstairs, 26 downstairs), Model 664 up to 80; but when fitted with single-deck bodywork, Model 663 could carry up to 30 seated passengers, Model 664 up to 39.

AEC began to develop diesel engines (also known as oil engines) in 1928, and the type A155 diesel engine with an Acro cylinder head and a displacement of 8.1 litres (490 cu in) was experimentally fitted to some Renowns during early 1931. Problems with this engine led to a redesign with a Ricardo Comet cylinder head, and the type A165 8.8-litre (540 cu in) diesel engine became an optional fitment in most bus models from September 1931. The 6.1-litre petrol engine remained available, and a 7.4-litre (450 cu in) petrol engine, type A145, was optional from 1931, with a version (type A162) having the power output increased to 120 bhp (89 kW) becoming available in 1932. The type A165 diesel engine was replaced by the type A171 7.58-litre (463 cu in) diesel engine in spring 1935. From about 1934, the model code was prefixed with the letter "O" (for oil) if a diesel engine was fitted, giving models O663 and O664. Customers wanting a direct injection diesel engine could buy models 663G or 664G, which were fitted with a Gardner 5LW or 6LW engine in place of the AEC unit, but this option was not publicised.

AEC had entered the trolleybus market in 1922 but orders dried up in 1928. In 1930, AEC collaborated with English Electric on a new range of trolleybuses with chassis based on AEC motorbuses of the period – the first of these was the Model 663T, based on the Model 663 Renown. This was followed by models 661T and 662T (based on the Model 661 Regent and Model 662 Regal respectively), and subsequently the Model 664T, which was based on the Model 664 Renown. Models 663T and 664T were primarily intended for double-deck bodywork, but some of each were given single-deck bodies.

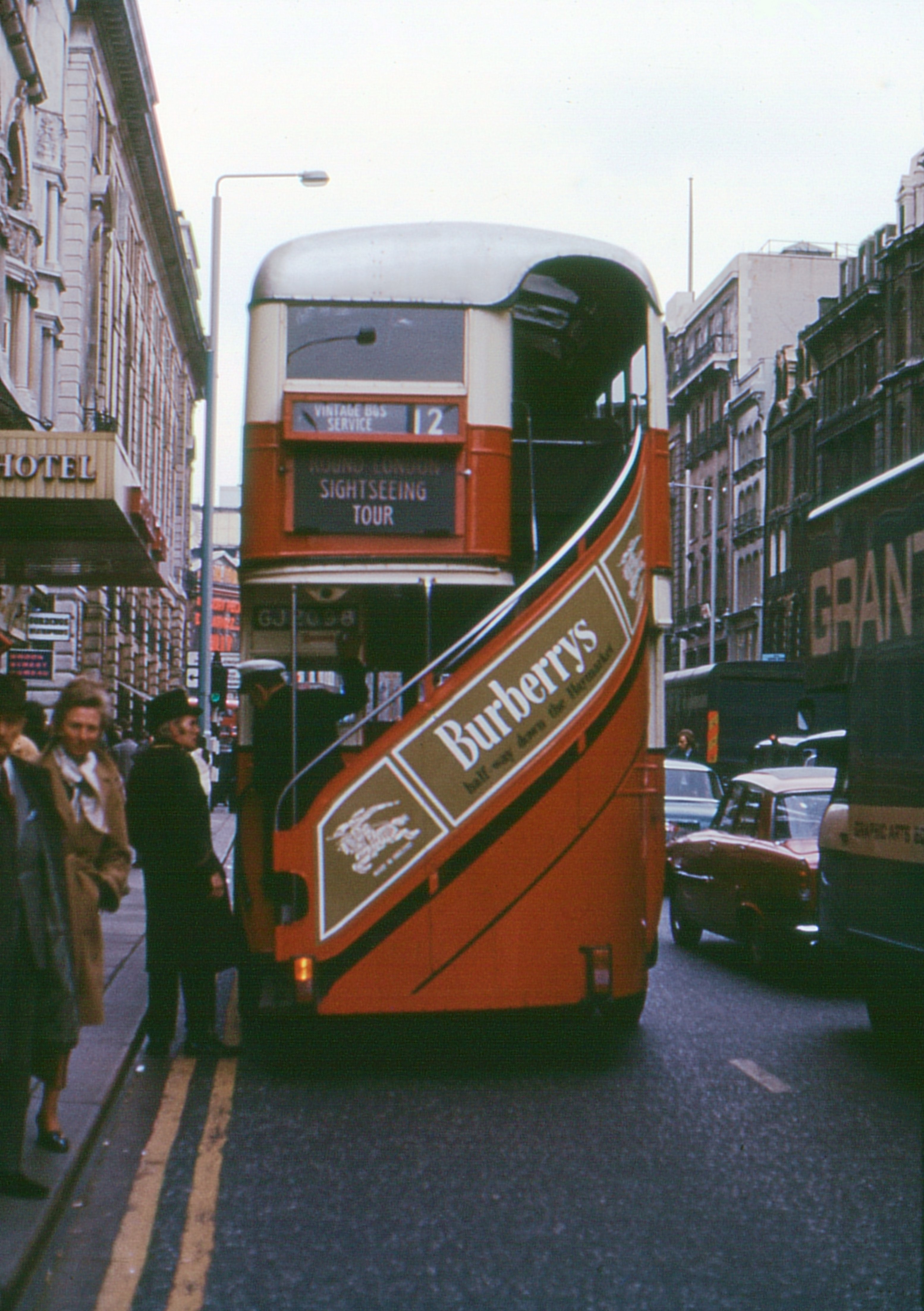
The first 150 for the LGOC had external staircases at the rear, like this ST Class AEC Regent

The biggest customer for both 663 and 664 models was the LGOC, which bought over 1200 of Model 663 between 1929 and 1932 fitted with double-deck bodywork (the first 150 of which had external staircases), and about 200 of Model 664 in 1931 fitted with single-deck bodywork. They formed the LT class of the LGOC, numbered between LT1 and LT1429, although some buses in this range were not built by AEC but in the LGOC's own workshops. Total production for the two internal combustion models was 1250 for Model 663, and 345 for Model 664 of which about fifty were exported. The biggest customer for the Model 663T trolleybus was London United Tramways (LUT), which in 1931 bought sixty (all double-deck) of the 89 produced. The LGOC amalgamated with LUT and other transport operators in 1933 to create the LPTB. The LPTB was the biggest customer for the Model 664T trolleybus, which in 1935–42 bought over 650 (all double-deck) of the 844 produced. In 1937–38, the LPTB bought a further 24 of Model 663, fitted with single-deck coach bodywork – these formed the LTC class, numbered between LTC1 and LTC24.

London Transport LT and LTC Classes
Fleet numbers	Model	Type	Body make	Seats	New	Original operator	Notes
LT1	AEC 663	Double-deck	LGOC	54	1929	LGOC	External staircase
LT2–150	AEC 663	Double-deck	LGOC	60	1930	LGOC	External staircase
LT151–740	AEC 663	Double-deck	LGOC (340); Park Royal (89); Short (80); Strachan (81)	56	1931	LGOC	
LT742–949	AEC 663	Double-deck	LGOC	56	1931–32	LGOC	
LT741	AEC 663	Double-deck	LGOC	60	1932	LGOC	
LT950–999	AEC 663	Double-deck	LGOC	60	1932	LGOC	
LT1204–1426	AEC 663	Double-deck	LGOC	60	1932	LGOC	
LT1001–50	AEC 664	Single-deck	LGOC	35	1931	LGOC	
LT1052–1136	AEC 664	Single-deck	LGOC	35	1931	LGOC	
LT1138–1201	AEC 664	Single-deck	LGOC	35	1931	LGOC	
LT1427–8	AEC 664	Single-deck	LGOC	35	1932	East Surrey Traction Co. (Note: East Surrey Traction Co. Ltd was renamed London General Country Services Ltd in 1932, the direct ancestor of London Country Bus Services)	
LT1000	LGOC CC (Note: Six were ordered, but only four were built; they were the last chassis built by the LGOC)	Double-deck	LGOC	54	1932	LGOC	Experimental
LT1051	LGOC CC	Double-deck	LGOC	54	1932	LGOC	Experimental
LT1202–3	LGOC CC	Double-deck	LGOC	54	1932	LGOC	Experimental
LT1137	AEC 664	Double-deck	LGOC	50	1931	LGOC	Experimental; coach seating
LT1429	AEC 664	Single-deck	Harrington	31	1932	Edward Hillmans Saloon Coaches	Coach seating
LTC1–24	AEC 663	Single-deck	Weymann	28; 30	1937–38	LPTB	Coach seating

== Models 3B2RA and 3B3RA (1962–1967) ==
AEC Renown
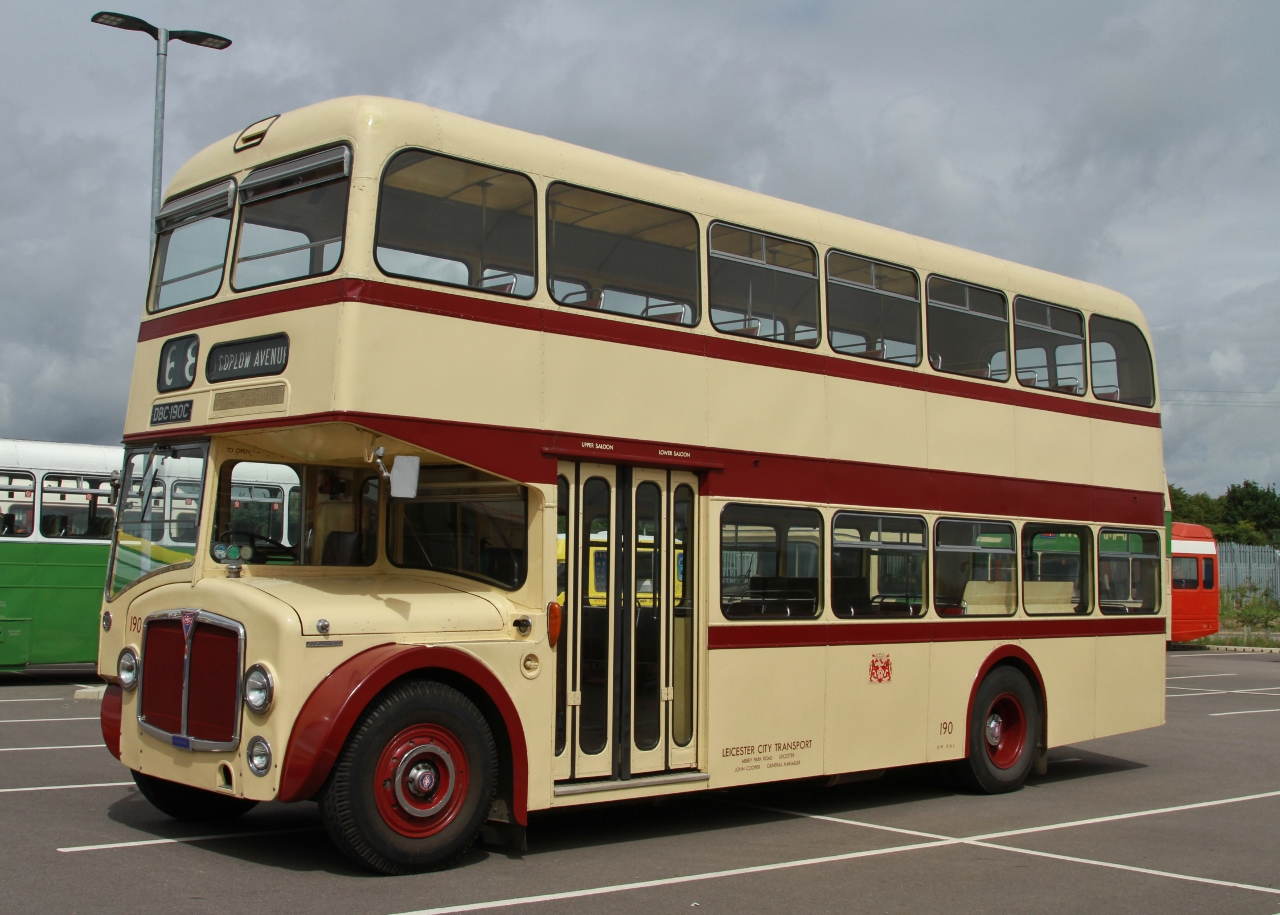
- 1965 AEC Renown 3B3RA (reg. DBC 190C), in Leicester Corporation Transport livery.

Overview
- Manufacturer: AEC
- Production: 1962–1967
- Assembly: Southall, England

Body and chassis
- Doors: Front, behind front axle
- Floor type: Lowbridge

Powertrain
- Engine: AEC AV590
- Transmission: AEC synchromesh AEC Monocontrol

Chronology
- Predecessor: AEC Bridgemaster

The third AEC Renown was a low-height two-axle double-decker bus chassis. It superseded the AEC Bridgemaster around 1962.

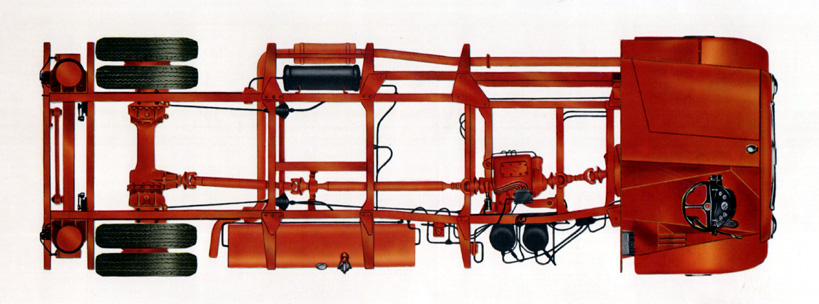
AEC Renown chassis, model 3B2RA. Major components, left to right: rear suspension; rear axle; exhaust silencer and air brake reservoir (top) fuel tank (bottom); epicyclic gearbox; engine cowl and driving position

The low-height double-decker AEC Bridgemaster was nearing the end of its production when AEC launched the Renown as its successor around 1962, not long before the acquisition of AEC by Leyland. The main difference between the Renown and its predecessor was the chassis design, the Renown was designed as a complete chassis, rather than integral construction adopted by the Bridgemaster, thus the Renown could be suited to different body designs. The engine was the AEC AV590, as used in the Bridgemaster, which had a displacement of 590 cu in (9.7 L) and developed 128 bhp (95 kW) at 1,800 rpm. The transmission could either be the AEC "Monocontrol" semi-automatic three-speed epicyclic gearbox, or a clutch and four-speed synchromesh gearbox. Two prototypes were built in 1962, one for each transmission option; the monocontrol example (model 3B2RA) was tried out by London Transport, and the synchromesh example (model 3B3RA) was initially exhibited at the Commercial Motor Show, and then used by AEC as a demonstrator. In the model codes, the initial 3B indicated a Renown (the Bridgemaster having been B or 2B); the next figure showed the number of pedals and thus the type of transmission – the Monocontrol option had no clutch pedal; the R denoted right-hand drive; and the A denoted air brakes.

The design, like the Bristol Lodekka and the Dennis Loline meant this double-decker could travel under low height bridges, whilst maintaining near-full-height standing room.

Bodywork was constructed by a variety of coachbuilders, primarily Park Royal Vehicles which built 130, but also included: East Lancs (33); Northern Counties (39); and Weymann (40). Most had the entrances situated just behind the front axle, but fourteen of those built by East Lancs had rear entrances. Major customers included City of Oxford Motor Services (43); East Yorkshire Motor Services (34); North Western Road Car Company (33); Nottingham City Transport (42); and Western Welsh (28). Virtually all customers specified the synchromesh transmission – only five (one of the prototypes, plus two each for King Alfred Motor Services and West Bridgford Urban District) were built with the Monocontrol transmission.

After Leyland acquired a 25% stake of Bristol Commercial Vehicles and Eastern Coach Works in late 1965, Leyland had three different front-engined low-height double-deck designs: AEC Renown, Bristol Lodekka and Albion Lowlander. Leyland quickly decided to cease taking orders for the Renown and Lowlander. The last AEC Renown was delivered in 1967, with a total of 251 buses built.

== Notes and references ==
- Aldridge, John (1995). British Buses Before 1945. Ian Allan Transport Library. Shepperton: Ian Allan. ISBN 0-7110-2279-8.
- Brown, Stuart J (2013). The Lodekka Alternatives. Hersham: Ian Allan Publishing.
- Bruce, J. Graeme; Curtis, Colin H. (August 1977) [1973]. The London Motor Bus: Its Origins and Development. Westminster: London Transport. ISBN 0-85329-083-0.
- Kidner, Roger W. (1975) [1950]. The London Motor-Bus 1896-1975. Locomotion Papers (5th ed.). Blandford: Oakwood Press. LP5.
- Lumb, Geoff (1995). British Trolleybuses 1911-1972. Ian Allan Transport Library. Shepperton: Ian Allan. ISBN 0-7110-2347-6.
- Poole, S.L. (May 1998) [1948]. The ABC of London's Transport: No. 1 - Buses and Coaches (2nd ed.). Shepperton: Ian Allan. ISBN 0-7110-2585-1. 9805/B2.
- Telfer, R.L.; Witton, Alan M., eds. (February 1978). Fleetbook 15: Buses of Greater London. Manchester: A.M. Witton. ISBN 0-86047-151-9.
- Townsin, Alan (October 1998). AEC. Ian Allan Transport Library. Shepperton: Ian Allan. ISBN 0-7110-2620-3. 9810/B.
- Wise, G.B. (1989). Bus & Coach Recognition: Veteran & Vintage. Shepperton: Ian Allan. ISBN 0-7110-1858-8.
