= AEC Bridgemaster =

British front-engined double-decker bus chassis

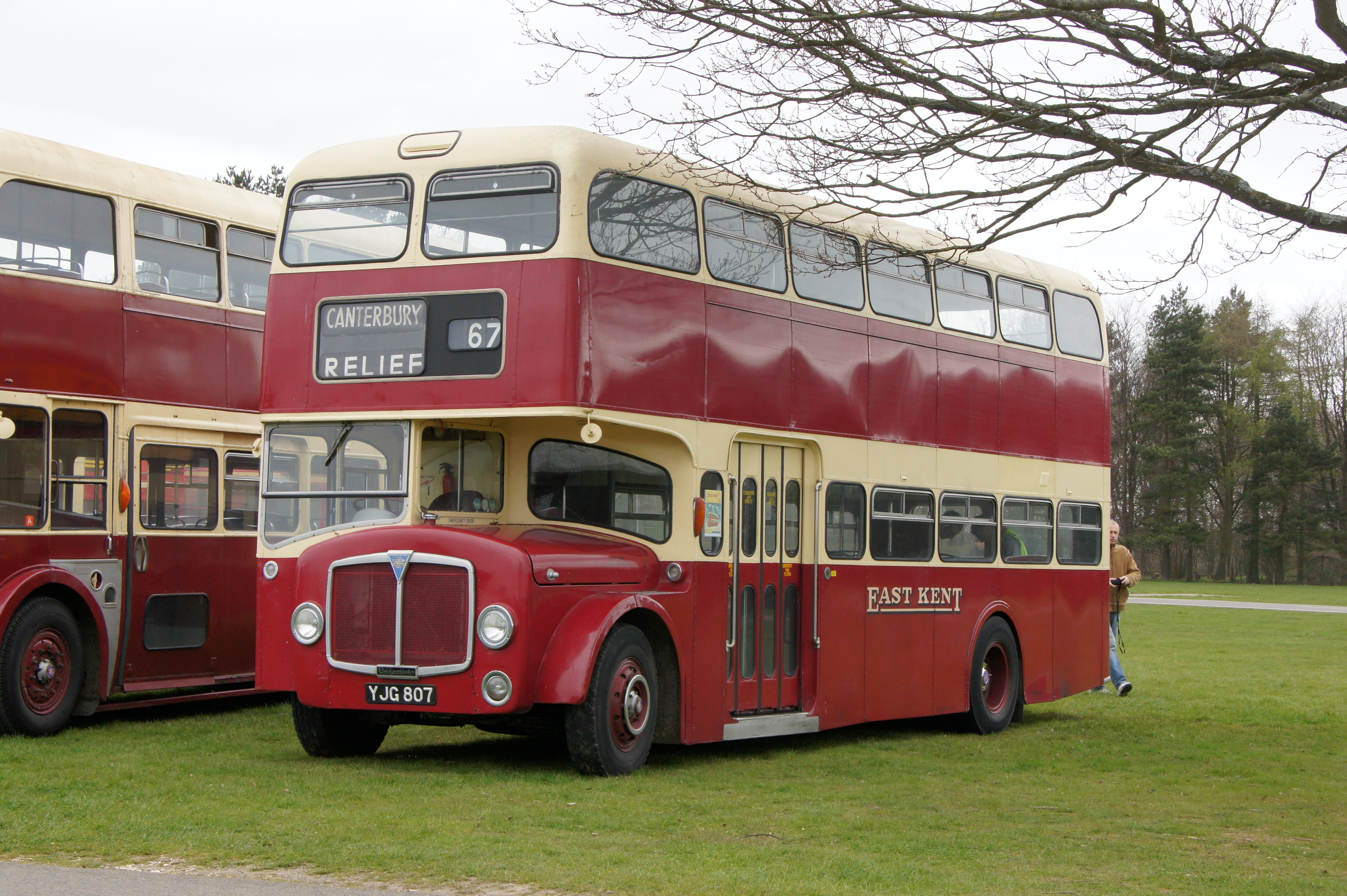
- Park Royal bodied AEC Bridgemaster (forward-entrance)

Overview
- Manufacturer: AEC
- Production: 1956–1963
- Assembly: Southall, England

Powertrain
- Engine: 7,702 cubic centimetres (470.0 cu in; 7.702 L) AEC AV470 Inline 6 Turbo-diesel (first two prototypes); 9,668 cubic centimetres (590.0 cu in; 9.668 L) AEC AV590 Inline 6 NA
- Power output: AEC AV470: 120 brake horsepower (120 PS; 89 kW) @ 2,300 rpm 1,200 newton-metres (890 lbf⋅ft) @ 1,700 rpm AEC AV590: 128 brake horsepower (130 PS; 95 kW) @ 1,800 rpm 430 pound-feet (580 N⋅m) @ 1,000 rpm
- Transmission: 4-speed AEC synchromesh

Dimensions
- Wheelbase: 5,029 millimetres (16.5 ft)
- Length: 9,144 millimetres (30 ft)
- Width: 2,438 millimetres (8 ft)
- Height: 4,130 millimetres (13.55 ft)
- Curb weight: 7,350–7,470 kilograms (16,204–16,469 lb)

Chronology
- Successor: AEC Renown

The AEC Bridgemaster was a front-engined low-height double-decker bus chassis manufactured by AEC from 1956 to 1963.

== History ==
The AEC Bridgemaster was introduced by AEC in 1956 to meet the demand of low-height double-deckers from municipal and independent bus operators across the United Kingdom, which were barred from purchasing the Bristol Lodekka. It was designed as a fully-integral vehicle, utilising two sub frames like the contemporary Routemaster. Four pre-production examples were bodied by Crossley with an aluminium body; production examples bodied by Park Royal were introduced from 1958 with steel body frames at the request of British Electric Traction.

In 1960 a forward-entrance version with slightly different driveline layout was introduced. A total of 180 were produced before it was superseded by the AEC Renown in 1963. East Yorkshire Motor Services were the largest customer, purchasing 50.

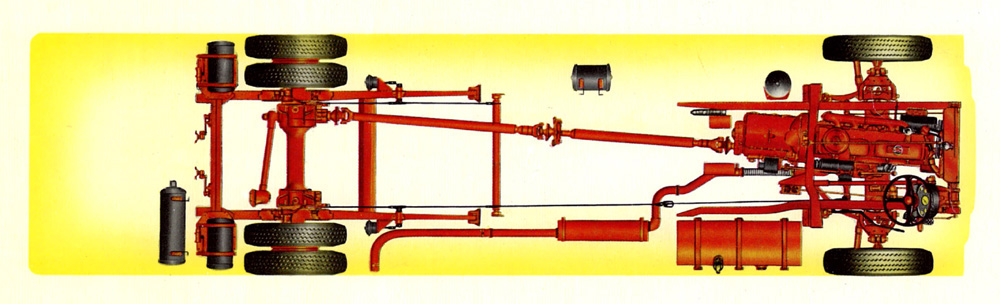
Rear-entrance AEC Bridgemaster chassis layout.

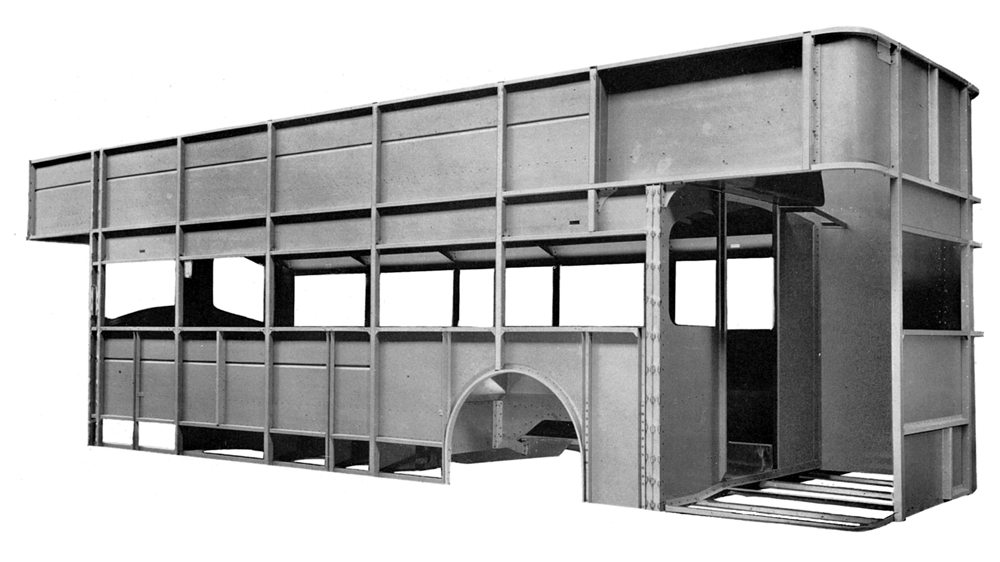
AEC Bridgemaster body frame.

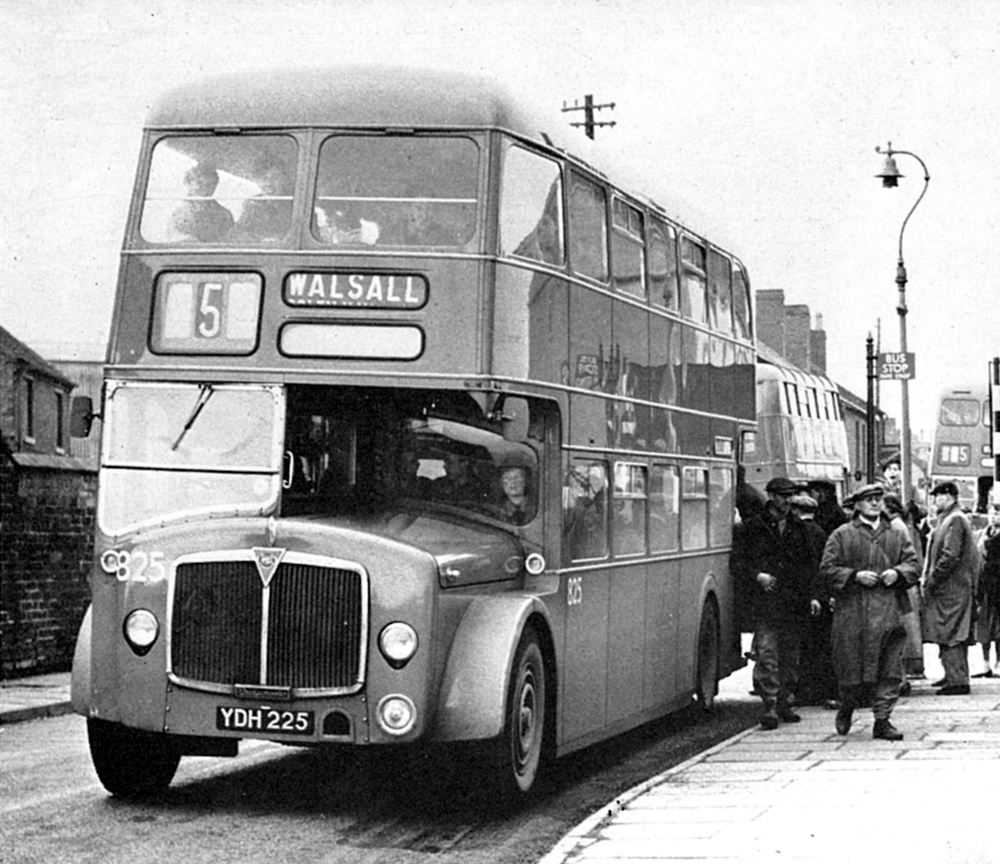
First pre-serial AEC Bridgemaster, registration YDH225, chassis number MB3RA001, bodywork by Crossley with H41/31R layout, entered into service with Walsall in Nov. 1956.

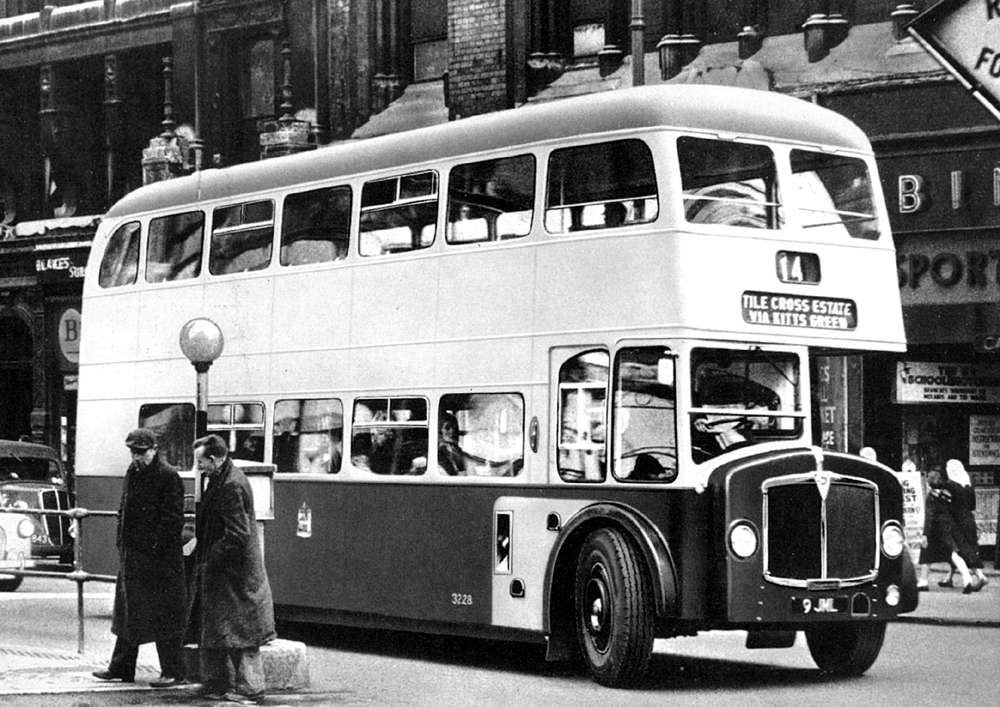
Second pre-serial AEC Bridgemaster, registration 9JML, chassis number MB3RA002, bodywork by Crossley with H41/31R layout, in the service of the Birmingham Corporation.
