= Henry Spurrier =

Sir Henry Spurrier (16 June 1898 – 17 June 1964), also known as Henry Spurrier III, was a British engineer and industrialist, and the third generation of the Spurrier family to head Leyland Motors.

== Henry Spurrier I and II ==
Spurrier's grandfather, also Henry, was one of the two Spurrier brothers who founded a company in 1896 to produce steam powered, and later petrol powered, commercial vehicles. The company was renamed Leyland Motors in 1907.

Spurrier's father, another Henry, spent several years in the United States working as a cowboy and as a draughtsman (at the Florida Central and Peninsula Railway). He became chairman and managing director of Leyland Motors in 1918, where his American wife assisted with the finances.

Henry Spurrier II's period in charge saw a series of a disastrous decisions, including an attempt to increase the value of Leyland vehicles by purchasing large quantities of war surplus stock, and inviting onto the board two men who subsequently turned out to be a bankrupt and a swindler. The latter devised a reorganization that increased the company's capital without diluting the Spurrier family shareholding, but in doing so accidentally cancelled a huge tax refund. The company's financial position rapidly worsened until it could only pay its debts with new loans from Henry I and II. The younger Henry was distracted by an affair and Leyland's chief creditor, the Manchester and Liverpool District Bank, thought he had more interest in his yachting hobby than the car business. In May 1922, the bank insisted on a board reorganization that transferred key responsibilities to new directors; by New Year 1924 he had been removed as chairman.

== Biography ==
Spurrier (Henry III) was educated at Repton School, and started working life as an apprentice in his grandfather's firm. During World War I he was a pilot lieutenant with the Royal Flying Corps, serving in Mesopotamia and the Middle East, where he contracted typhoid and dysentery, and India. His digestive system was permanently damaged and he survived for much of his life on scrambled eggs as he dealt with a succession of major stomach problems.

Immediately after the war Spurrier involved himself in car development, working with the chief engineer at Leyland Motors, J.G. Parry-Thomas and with his assistant Reid Railton. They produced a luxury touring car, the Leyland Eight, with which they intended to compete with Rolls-Royce. It was exhibited at the 1920 London motor show, but only a few handfuls were ever built due to the company's financial woes. This period was a formative experience, giving him a lifelong concern for cost control and a tendency to fear the worst when assessing the firm's future prospects.

In World War II, Leyland Motors manufactured tanks, including the Centaur tank. Spurrier and W. A. Robotham of Rolls-Royce agreed in 1940 that the current Nuffield Liberty L-12 tank engine was unreliable and underpowered; a Rolls-Royce team under Robotham and with three of Spurrier's best designers developed the Meteor tank engine from the Merlin aero engine.

After his father's death, Spurrier progressed to become general manager in the mid-1940s and managing director of Leyland Motors in 1949. He sought to expand the company from a position of strength, keeping a firm grip on costs and profits. Several firms entered into negotiations as acquisition or merger targets before Spurrier's caution brought the deal to a halt.

The 1950s were a period of stability as the company continued its frugal profitability under a triumvirate: Spurrier was in overall charge (knighted in 1955 and chairman from 1957), but his proteges Stanley Markland and Donald Stokes ran the firm's production and marketing respectively. Under this leadership Leyland Motors acquired Standard Triumph in 1961 and Associated Commercial Vehicles, the parent company of major rivals AEC in 1962; the newly enlarged company became the Leyland Motor Corporation (LMC), and a car producer once again.

Spurrier retired in 1963 and died twelve months later in June 1964. Donald Stokes, his appointed successor, originally a Leyland student apprentice and managing director of Leyland Motors Limited since 1962 was to take his place as chairman in 1966.
