= Vickers VR180 Vigor =

British crawler tractor

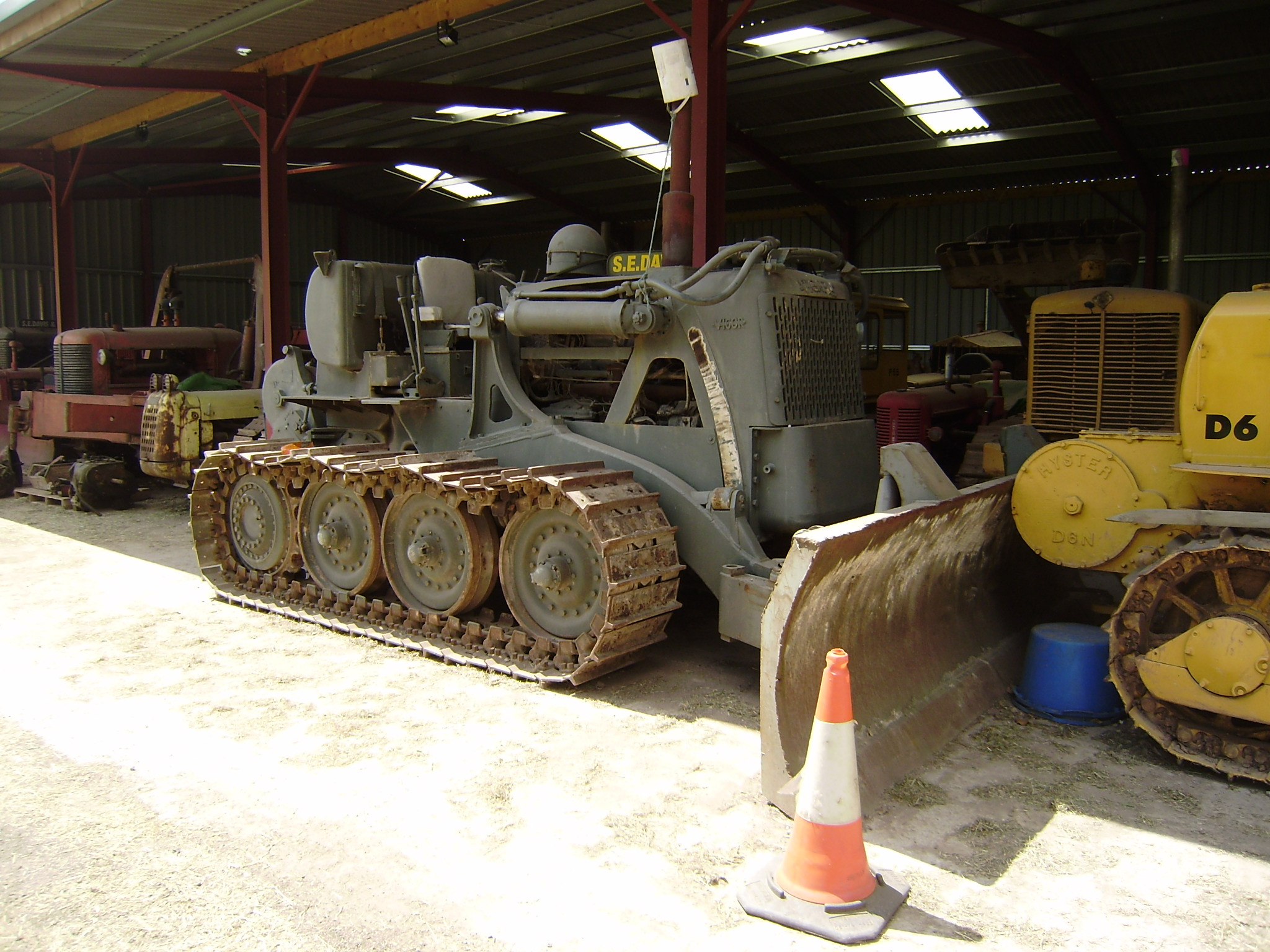
Vigor with bulldozer blade

The Vickers VR180 Vigor was a British crawler tractor, built from 1951 to 1958 by Vickers-Armstrongs. Since the 1920s, the company gained substantial experience in the design and construction of tanks and continuous track vehicles. After the war they developed a civilian crawler tractor that could be sold for use in peacetime reconstruction work. It was notable for the unusual sophistication of its chassis.

The Vigor was built at the Scotswood, Newcastle-upon-Tyne works.

== Design ==
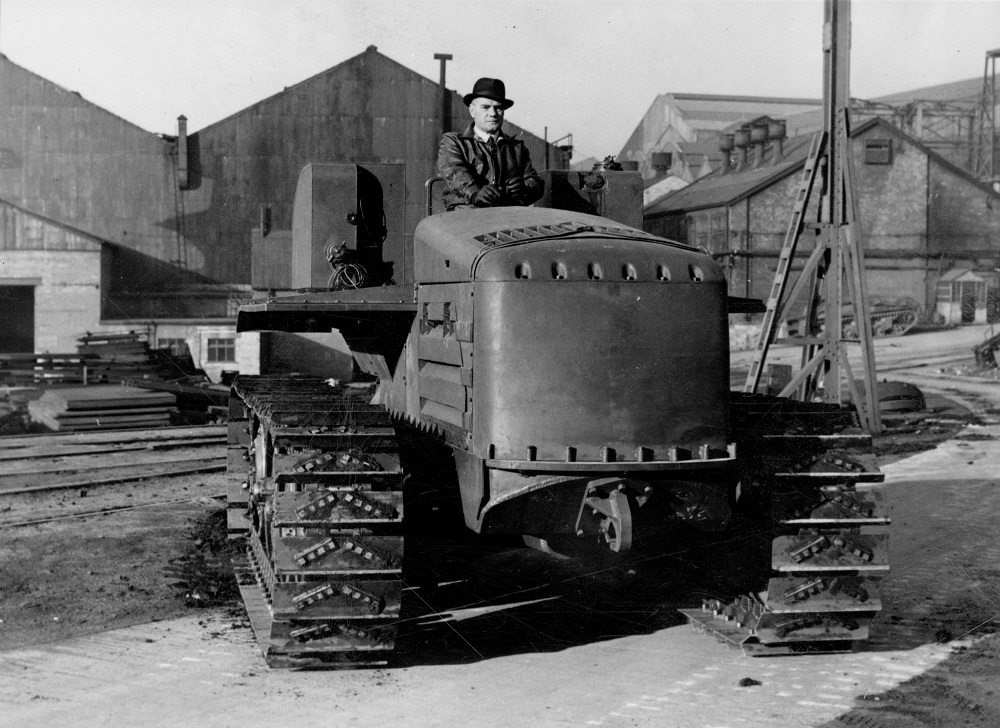
1949 prototype at Vickers' Elswick Works

The tractor's most distinctive feature was its running gear: four full height roadwheels also acting as rear drive sprocket, front idler and track return rollers. This was the same layout as the Tetrarch light tank, which Vickers-Armstrongs had developed in the 1930s.

In common with tanks of this period, but in contrast to crawler tractors, the suspension had considerable articulation and permitted high speeds. The Vigor was capable of nearly 10 mph, while the comparable Caterpillar D8 could only reach 5 mph. The four roadwheels were linked as two bogies on each side. Pairs of bogies on opposite sides were linked by an articulated beam with a centre tilt pivot. This suspension required a flexible track, developed by Vickers, with rubber sealing washers between the moving parts. Wear to the rubber in service could make the track floppy, a drawback to the design. Together with the sophisticated suspension articulation, if not well-maintained, the Vigor was prone to throwing tracks when run at speed.

Vehicle chassis were fabricated in two pieces, mainly from large iron or steel castings. The nose of early models was distinctively solid and sloped, while other makers had a vertical radiator grille. Later models, after experience in Australia, also gained a lightweight steel grille for better ventilation. The chassis unbolted relatively quickly, two hours being cited, into front (engine) and rear (transmission) components.

The engine was a Rolls-Royce C6SFL 12.17l six-cylinder supercharged diesel. This engine was more powerful than other tractors of this age and weight, with 190 hp at the engine and 150 drawbar hp. However, the fuel consumption was high, at 9.8 gallons per hour at full rate. The transmission was initially a three-speed manual and high-low-reverse splitter gearbox (Note: Giving six forward gears and three reverse) with a relatively small Borg & Beck 18 inch single plate dry clutch. This small clutch plate had a reputation for early failure if worked hard. An improvement from mid-production was the option of a Rolls-Royce hydraulic torque converter, the same converters Rolls-Royce were supplying with the same engines for the new British Rail DMU fleet.

A full range of accessories were offered: front dozer blades with cable or hydraulic lifts, rear ripper blades for breaking virgin bush as farmland in Australia, and a rear logging winch of 30,000 to 50,000 lbf pull. (Note: Maximum pull was with the winch drum empty, reduced when cable was wound onto the drum.)

Production of the VR180 ran from 1952 to 1958, with approximately 1,500 built. The design continued until 1961 as the Vickers VR110 Vikon with a smaller 142 hp C4SFL four-cylinder engine. Around 20 Vikon were built, most going to New Zealand.

== Sales ==
As for most capital equipment of the early 1950s, the main market was in the Commonwealth: the UK home market could not afford it, particularly with the Austerity Purchase Tax of the time, while the US market preferred domestic products, such as the Caterpillar.

Many Vigors went to Australia, where rough ground capability was appreciated, even though the purchase cost was considerably more than the popular option of war-surplus tanks with turret and roof armour cut away.

A major UK seller was Jack Olding of Hatfield, who relinquished their pre-war Caterpillar dealership in favour of Vickers.

Vigors were also used by the Royal Engineers. One is on display today in their museum at Gillingham, Kent.

== In popular culture ==
The Vigor chassis became a distinctive feature of Gerry Anderson's Thunderbirds TV series. Many of the pod-carried land vehicles used by Thunderbird 2 such as Firefly and the carrier vehicle for The Mole were based on the Vigor. A 1/16 scale plastic toy of the period by Victory Industries of Guildford represented the Vigor; in typical Gerry Anderson style, a plastic toy that was available and affordable, but rare enough to be different and not obviously recognisable.
