= Train station =

Railway facility for loading or unloading trains

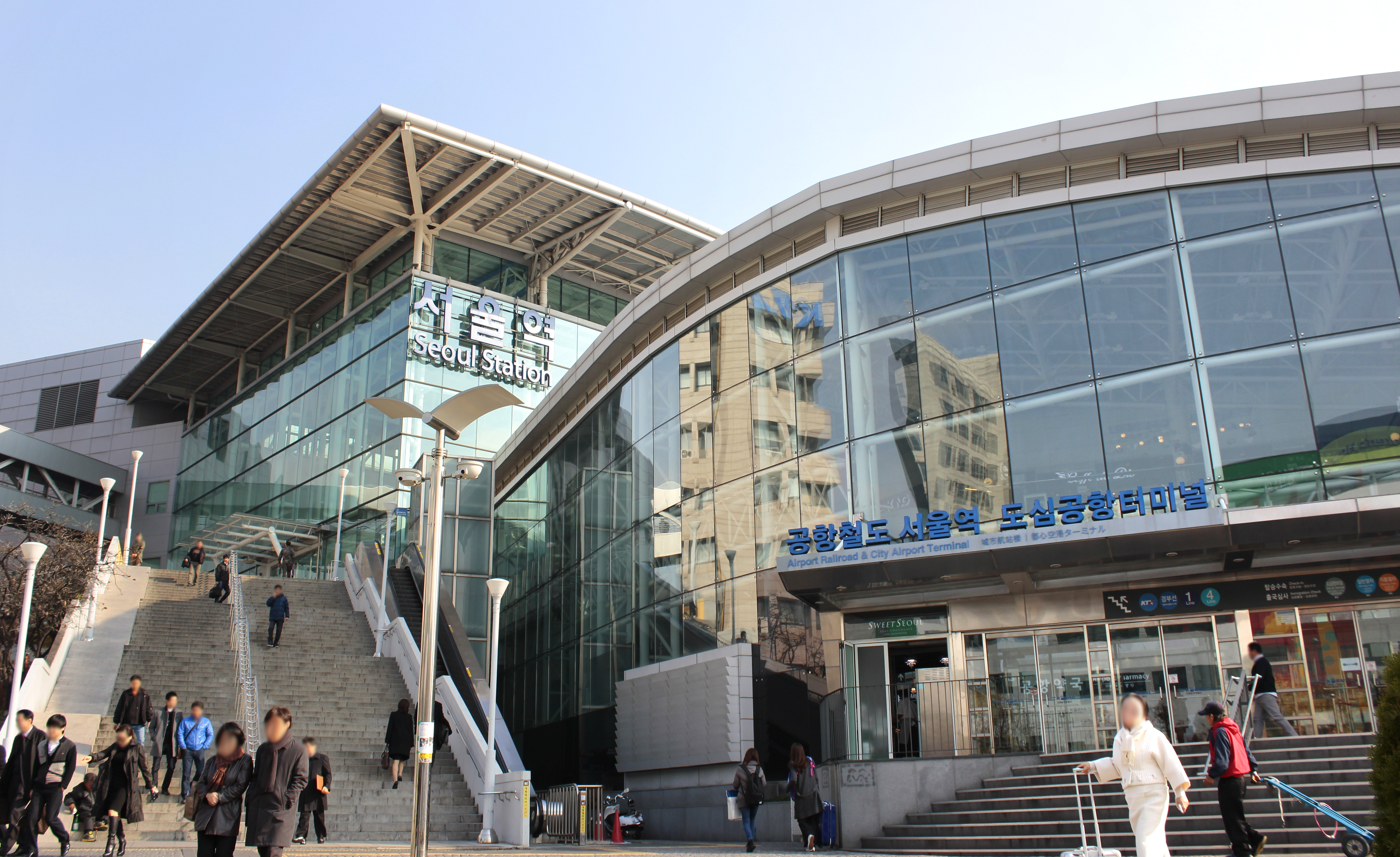
Seoul Station, is a major railway station in Seoul, the capital of South Korea

A train station, railroad station, or railway station is a railway facility where trains stop to load or unload passengers, freight, or both. It generally consists of at least one platform, one track, and a station building providing such ancillary services as ticket sales, waiting rooms, and baggage/freight service. Stations on a single-track line often have a passing loop to accommodate trains traveling in the opposite direction.

Locations at which passengers only occasionally board or leave a train, sometimes consisting of a short platform and a waiting area but sometimes indicated by no more than a sign, are variously referred to as "stops", "flag stops", "halts", or "provisional stopping places". The stations themselves may be at ground level, underground, or elevated. Connections may be available to intersecting rail lines or other transport modes such as buses, trams, or other rapid transit systems.

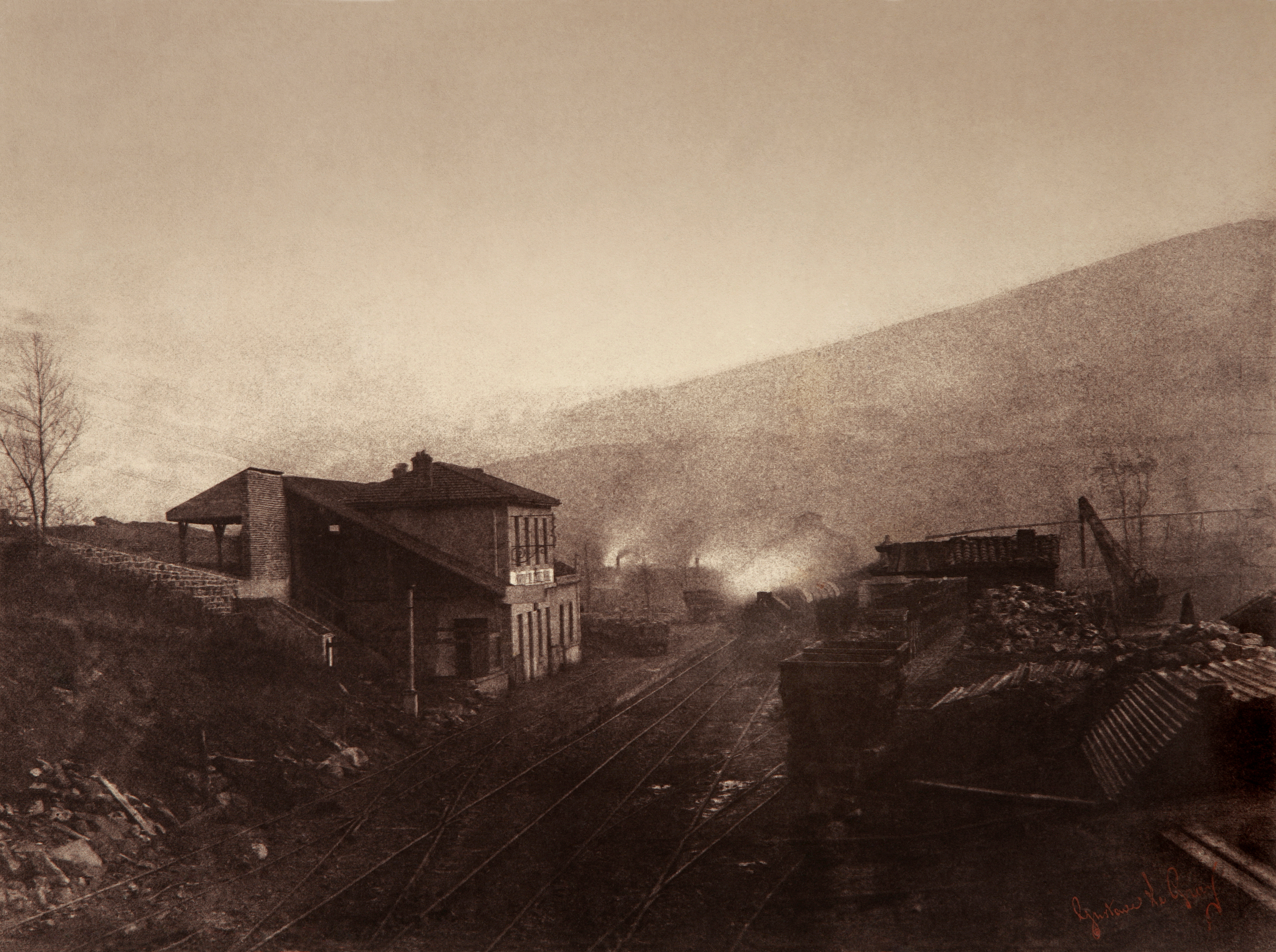
Station with train and coal depot photographed by Gustave Le Gray in 1856

== Terminology ==
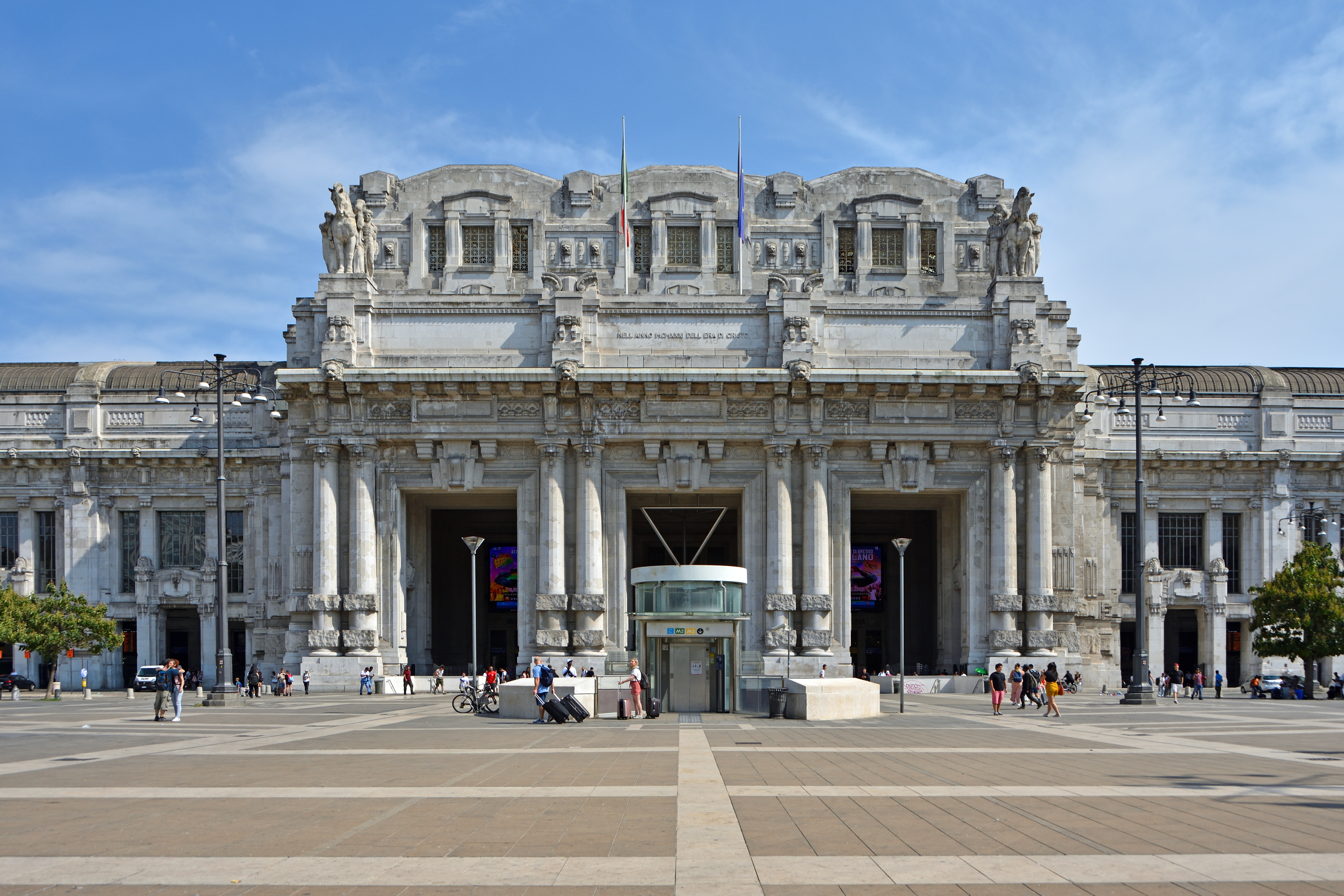
Milan Centrale, Italy, the largest railway station in Europe by volume as of 2023

Train station is the terminology typically used in the U.S. In Europe, the terms train station and railway station are both commonly used, with railroad being obsolete. In British Commonwealth usage, where railway station is the traditional term, the word station is commonly understood to mean a railway station unless otherwise specified.

In the United States, the term depot is sometimes used as an alternative name for station, along with the compound forms train depot, railway depot, and railroad depot—it is used for both passenger and freight facilities. The term depot is not used in reference to vehicle maintenance facilities in the U.S.. In contrast, it is used in this way in Canada and the United Kingdom.

== History ==
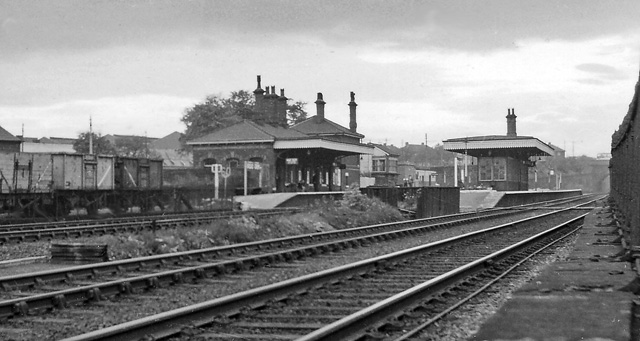
Broad Green station, Liverpool, England, shown in 1962, opened in 1830, is the oldest station site in the world still in use as a passenger station.

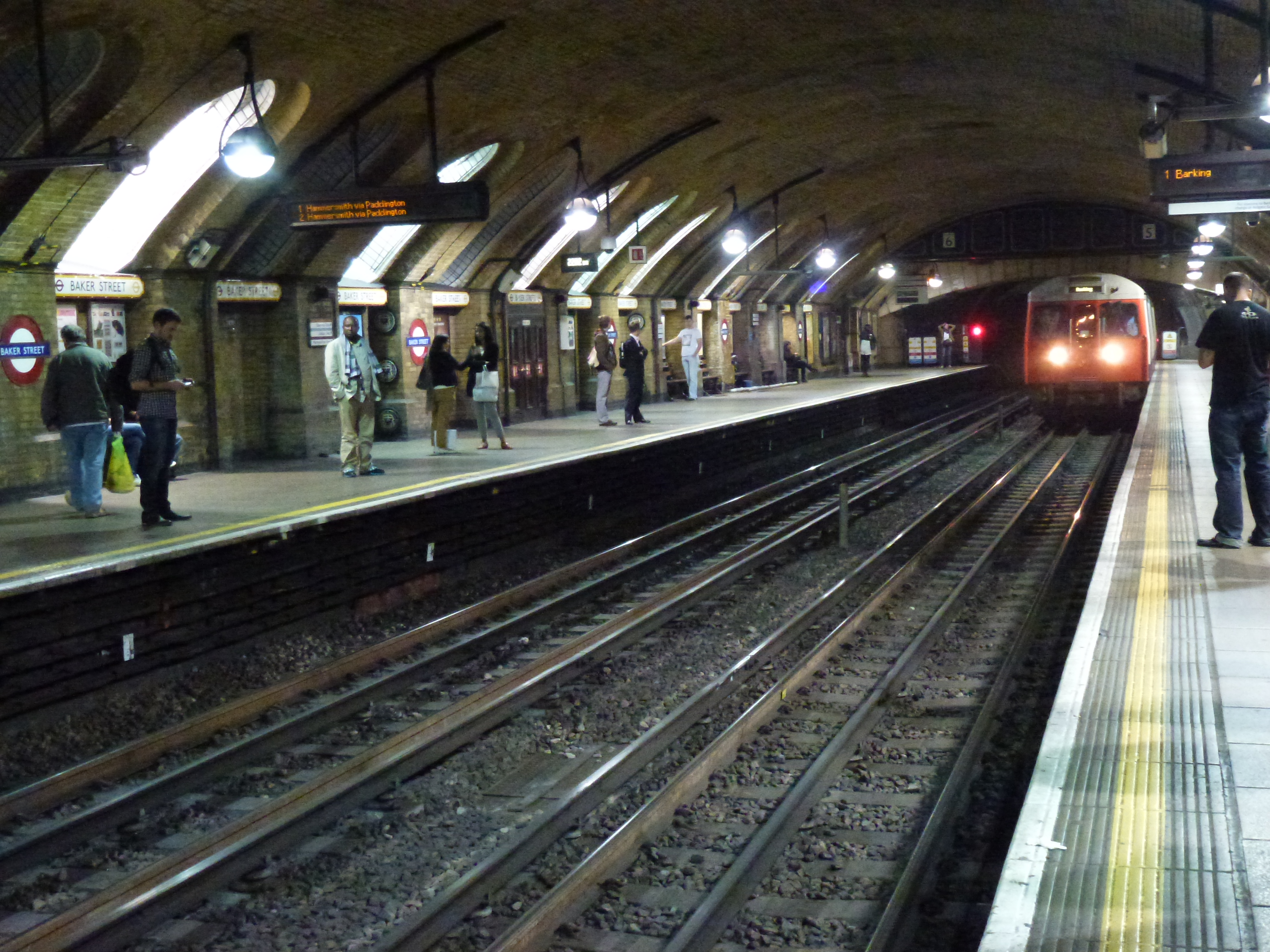
Baker Street station, London, opened in 1863, was the world's first station to be completely underground. Its original part, seen here, is just below the surface and was constructed by cut-and-cover tunneling.

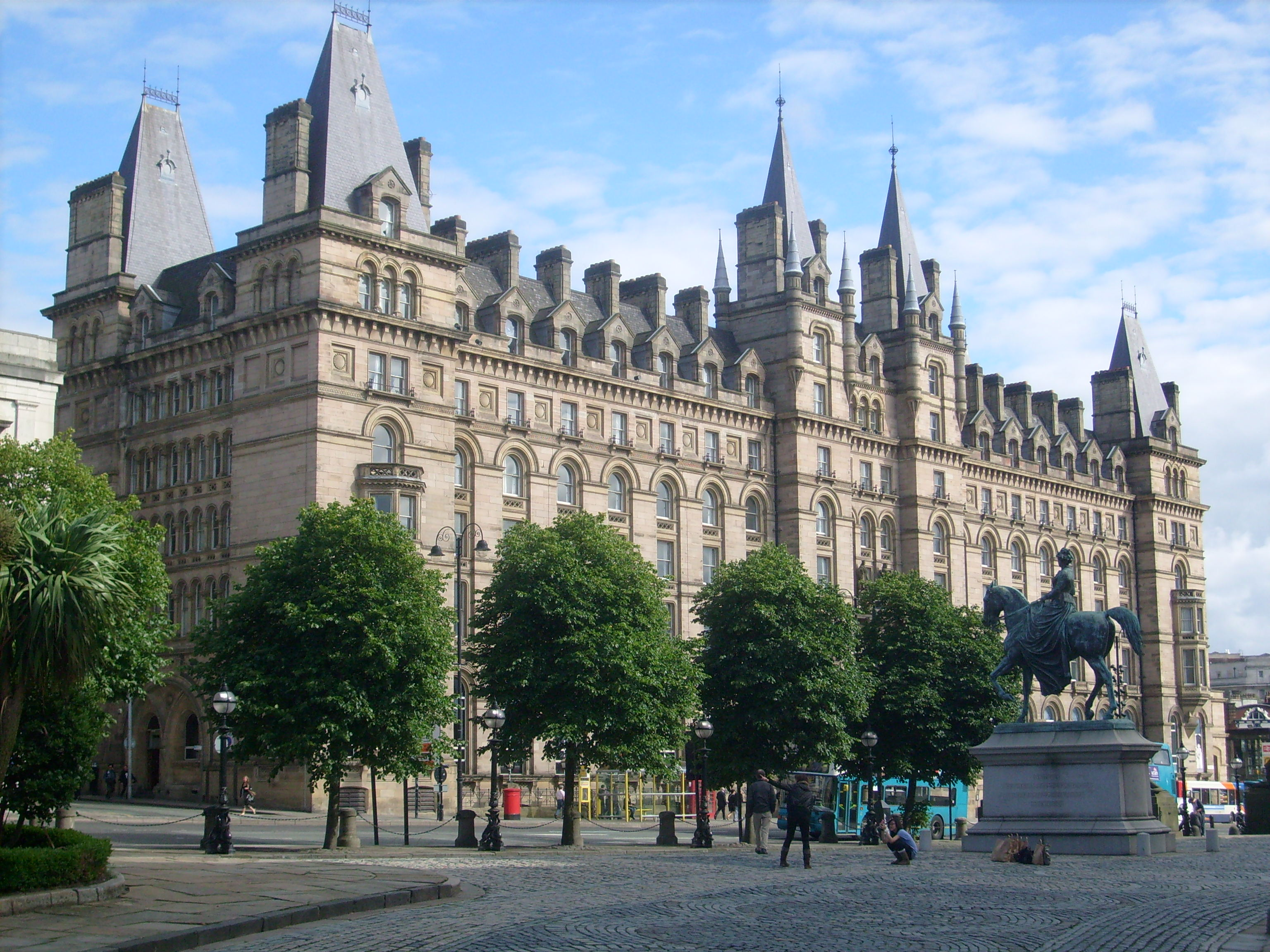
Liverpool Lime Street station's hotel frontage resembles a château; the station is the world's oldest used terminus.

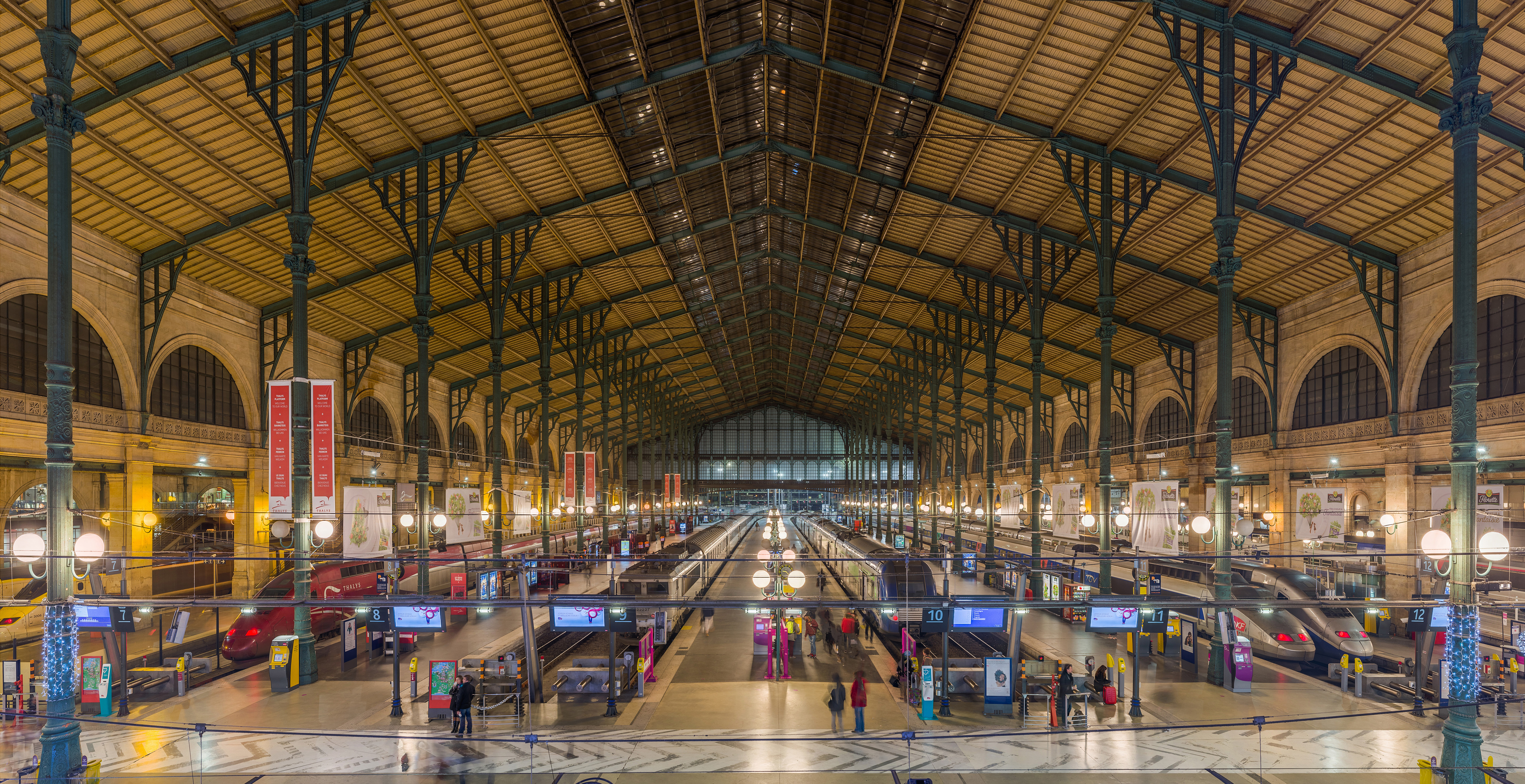
Gare du Nord is one of the six large terminus stations of the SNCF mainline network for Paris. It is the busiest railway station outside Japan, serving 206.7 million commuter rail, French Intercités and high-speed TGV, and international (Eurostar, Thalys) rail passengers a year as of 2016.

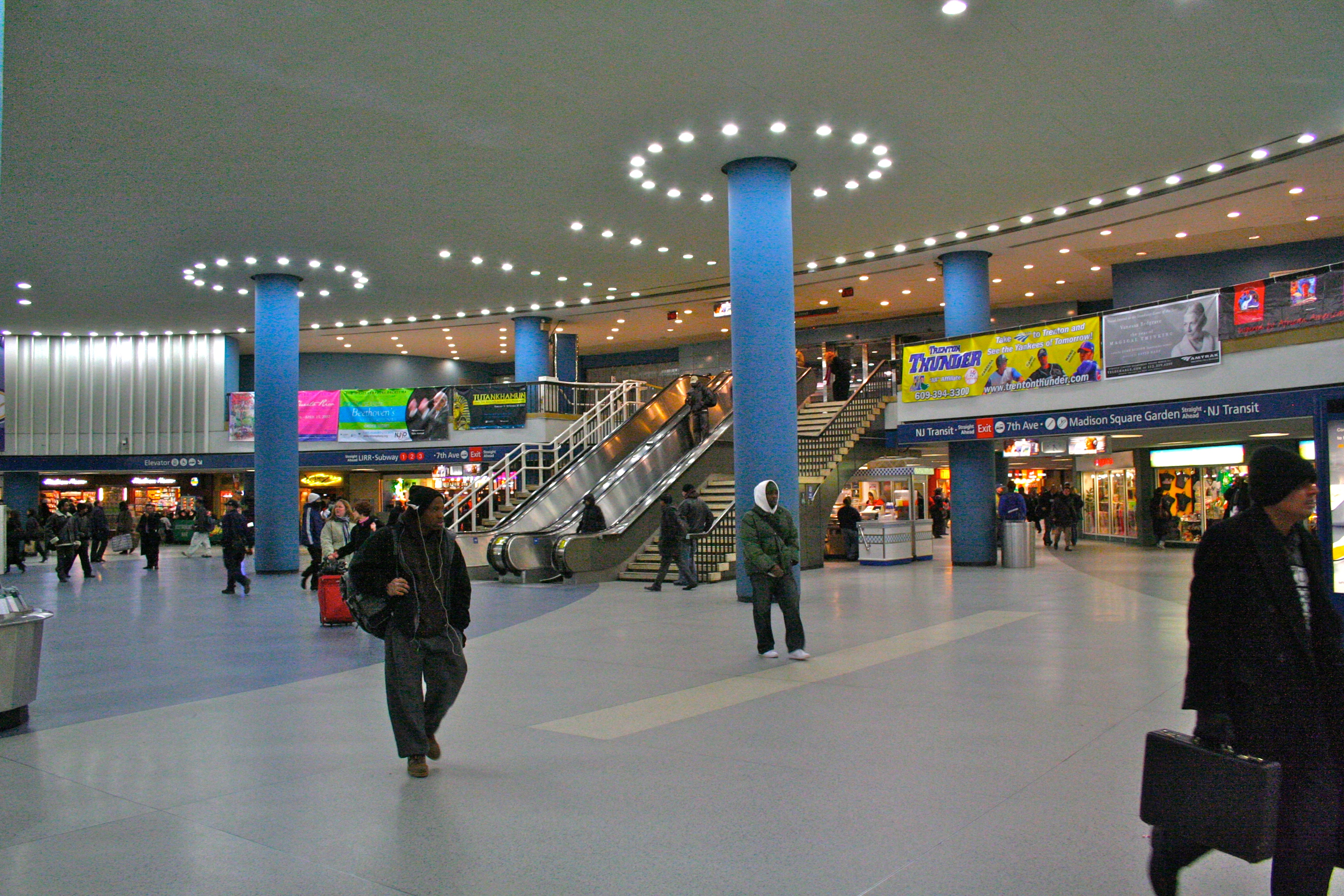
Penn Station in Midtown Manhattan, New York City, is an important railway terminal and transfer hub as well as the busiest railroad station in the Western Hemisphere, serving more than 600,000 passengers a day as of 2025.

The world's first recorded railway station, for trains drawn by horses rather than engined locomotives, began passenger service in 1807. It was The Mount in Swansea, Wales, on the Oystermouth (later the Swansea and Mumbles) Railway. The world's oldest for engined trains was Heighington railway station, on the Stockton and Darlington railway in north-east England built by George Stephenson in the early 19th century, operated by locomotive Locomotion No. 1. The station opened in 1827 and was in use until the 1970s. The building, Grade II*-listed, was in bad condition, but was restored in 1984 as an inn. The inn closed in 2017; in 2024, plans were underway to renovate the derelict station in time for the railway line's 200th anniversary.

The two-story Mount Clare station in Baltimore, Maryland, United States, which survives as a museum, first saw passenger service as the terminus of the horse-drawn Baltimore and Ohio Railroad on 22 May 1830.

The oldest terminal station in the world was Crown Street railway station in Liverpool, England, built in 1830, on the locomotive-hauled Liverpool to Manchester line. The station was slightly older than the still extant Liverpool Road railway station terminal in Manchester. The station was the first to incorporate a train shed. Crown Street station was demolished in 1836, as the Liverpool terminal station moved to Lime Street railway station. Crown Street station was converted to a goods station terminal.

The first stations had little in the way of buildings or amenities. The first stations in the modern sense were on the Liverpool and Manchester Railway, opened in 1830. Manchester's Liverpool Road Station, the second oldest terminal station in the world, is preserved as part of the Museum of Science and Industry in Manchester. It resembles a row of Georgian houses.

Early stations were sometimes built with both passenger and freight facilities, though some railway lines were goods-only or passenger-only; if a line were dual-purpose, there would often be a freight depot separate from the passenger station. This type of dual-purpose station can sometimes still be found today, though in many cases goods facilities are restricted to major stations.

Many stations date from the 19th century and reflect the grandiose architecture of the time, lending prestige to the city as well as to railway operations. Countries where railways arrived later may still have such architecture, as later stations often imitated 19th-century styles. Various forms of architecture have been used in the construction of stations, from those boasting grand, intricate, Baroque- or Gothic-style edifices, to plainer utilitarian or modernist styles. Stations in Europe tended to follow British designs and were, in some countries such as Italy, financed by British railway companies.

Train stations built more recently often have a similar feel to airports, with a simple, abstract style. Examples of modern stations include those on newer high-speed rail networks, such as the Shinkansen in Japan, THSR in Taiwan, TGV lines in France, and ICE lines in Germany.

== Facilities ==
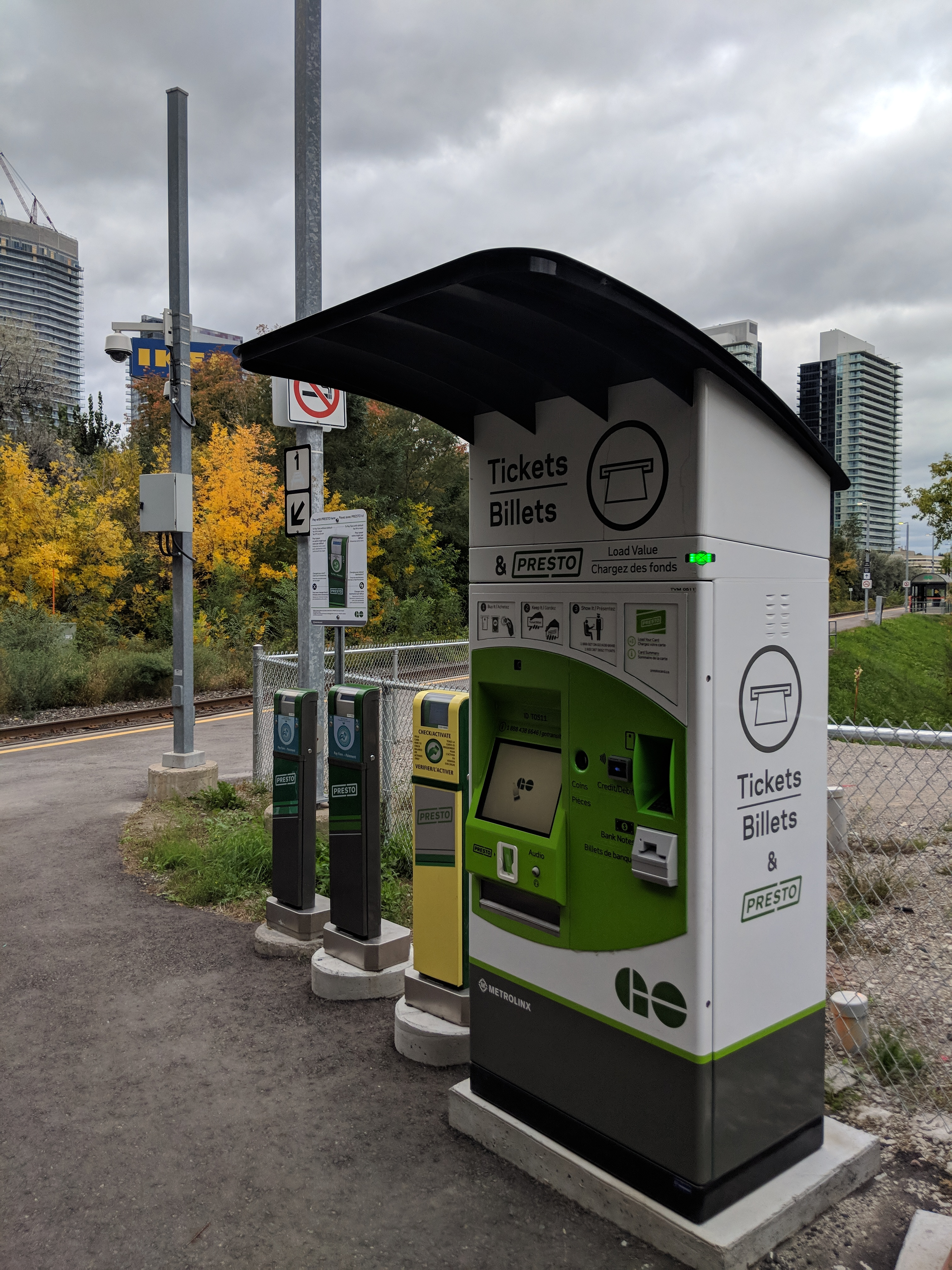
A Presto contactless smart card reader and self-serve ticket machine at a suburban train station in Toronto, Canada

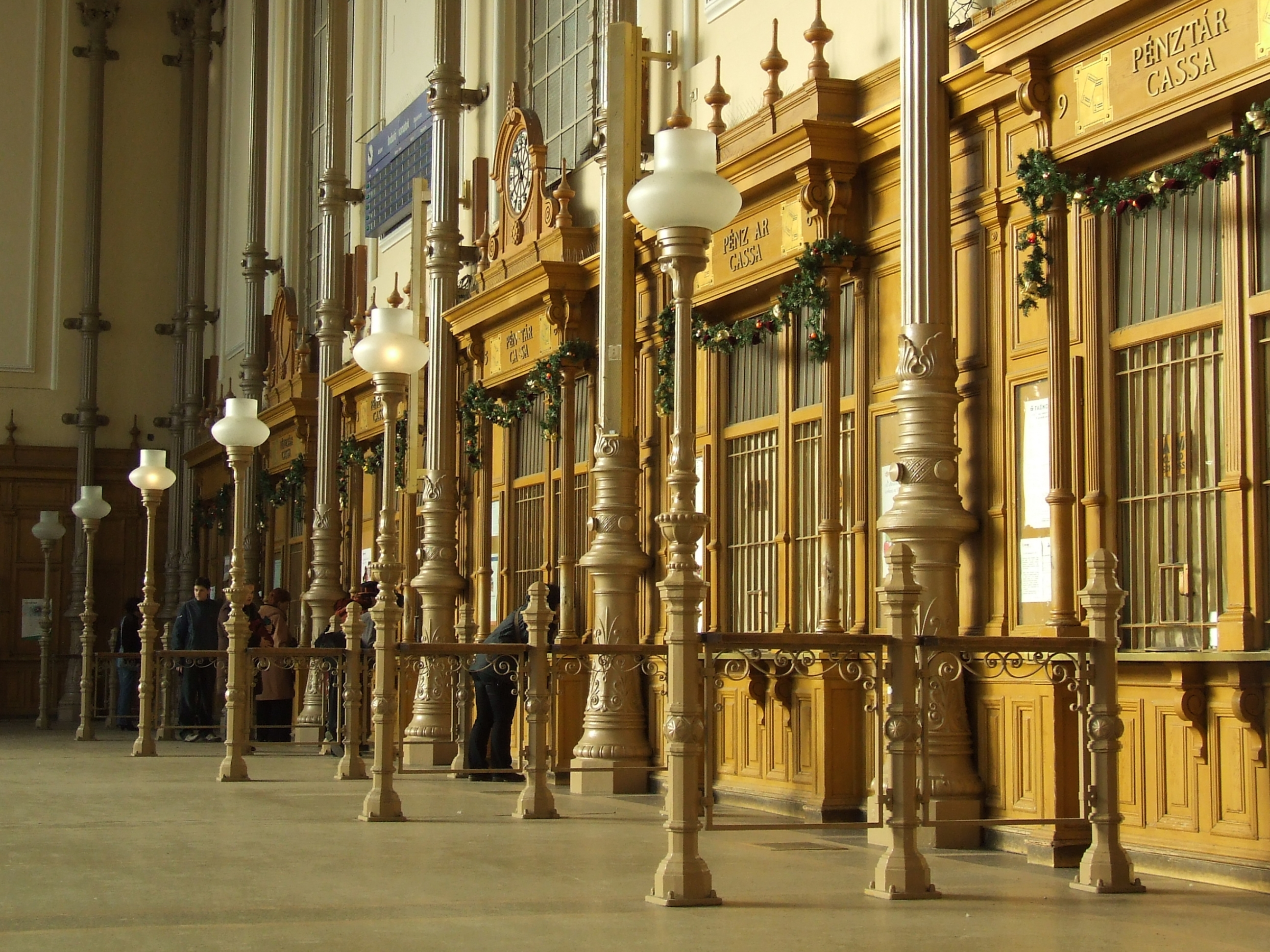
Ticket counters at the Nyugati Railway Station in Budapest, Hungary

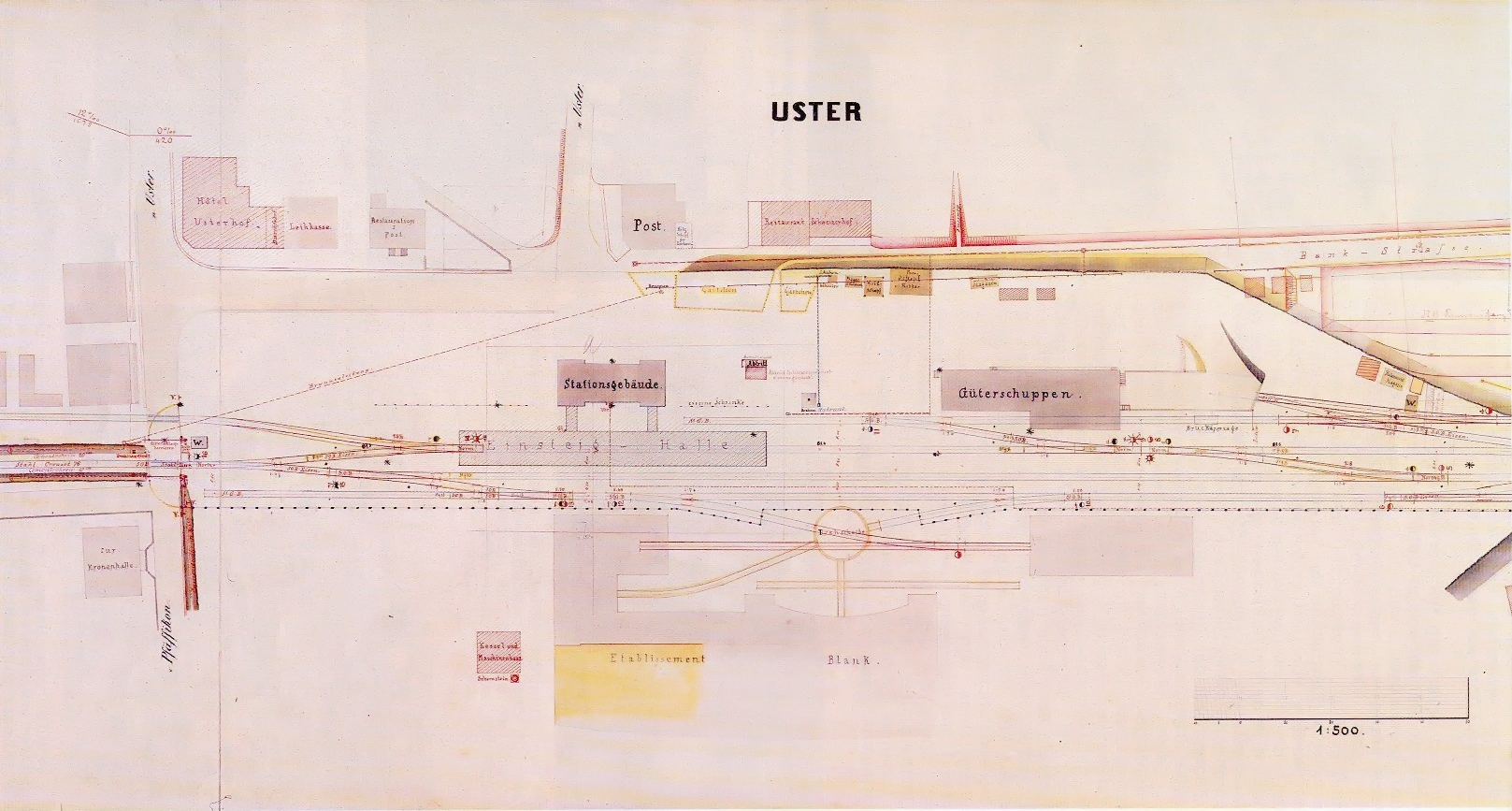
Historic track plan of a railway station in Switzerland showing passenger and goods facilities and a small locomotive depot

Stations normally have staffed ticket sales offices, automated ticket machines, or both, although on some lines tickets are sold on board the trains. Many stations include a shop or convenience store. Larger stations usually have fast-food or restaurant facilities. In some countries, stations may also have a bar or pub. Other station facilities may include: toilets, left-luggage, lost-and-found, departures and arrivals schedules, luggage carts, waiting rooms, taxi ranks, bus bays and even car parks. Larger or staffed stations tend to have a greater range of facilities, including a station security office. These are usually open to travelers when there is sufficient traffic over a long enough period to justify the cost. In large cities, this may mean facilities available around the clock. A basic station might only have platforms, though it may still be distinguished from a halt, a stopping or halting place that may not even have platforms.

Many stations, whether large or small, offer interchange with local transportation, ranging from a simple bus stop across the street to underground rapid-transit urban rail stations.

In many African, South American, and Asian countries, stations also serve as sites for public markets and other informal businesses. This is especially true on tourist routes or stations near tourist destinations.

In addition to providing passenger services and goods-loading facilities, stations can sometimes have locomotive and rolling stock depots, usually with facilities for storing and refueling rolling stock and performing minor repairs.

== Configurations ==
The basic configuration of a station, along with various other features, sets certain types apart. The first is the level of the tracks. Stations are often sited where a road crosses the railway: unless the crossing is a level crossing, the road and railway will be at different levels. The platforms will often be raised or lowered relative to the station entrance: the station buildings may be on either level, or both. The other arrangement, where the station entrance and platforms are on the same level, is also common, but is perhaps rarer in urban areas, except when the station is a terminus. Stations located at level crossings can be problematic if the train blocks the roadway while it stops, causing road traffic to wait for an extended period. Stations also exist where the station buildings are above the tracks. An example of this is Arbroath.

Occasionally, a station serves two or more railway lines at differing levels. This may be due to the station's position at a point where two lines cross (example: Berlin Hauptbahnhof), or may be to provide separate station capacity for two types of service, such as intercity and suburban (examples: Paris-Gare de Lyon and Philadelphia's 30th Street Station), or for two different destinations.

Stations may also be classified according to the layout of the platforms. Apart from single-track lines, the most basic arrangement is a pair of tracks for the two directions; there is then a basic choice of an island platform between two separate platforms outside the tracks (side platforms), or a combination of the two. With more tracks, the possibilities expand.

Some stations have unusual platform layouts due to space constraints of the station location or the alignment of the tracks. Examples include staggered platforms, such as at Tutbury and Hatton railway station on the Crewe–Derby line, and curved platforms, such as Cheadle Hulme railway station on the Macclesfield to Manchester Line. Stations at junctions can also have unusual shapes – a Keilbahnhof (or "wedge-shaped" station) is sited where two lines split. Triangular stations also exist where two lines form a three-way junction, and platforms are built on all three sides, for example Shipley and Earlestown stations.

=== Tracks ===
At a station, there are different types of tracks serving different purposes. A station may also have a passing loop with a loop line that comes off the straight main line and merge back to the main line on the other end by railroad switches to allow trains to pass.

A track with a spot at the station to board and disembark trains is called a station track or house track regardless of whether it is a main line or loop line. If such a track is served by a platform, the track may be called a platform track. A loop line without a platform, used only to allow a train to clear the main line at the station, is called a passing track. A track at the station without a platform, which is used for trains to pass the station without stopping, is called a through track.

There may be other sidings at the station that are lower-speed tracks for other purposes. A maintenance track or a maintenance siding, usually connected to a passing track, is used for parking maintenance equipment, trains not in service, autoracks or sleepers. A refuge track is a dead-end siding connected to a station track, used as temporary storage for a disabled train.

=== Terminus ===
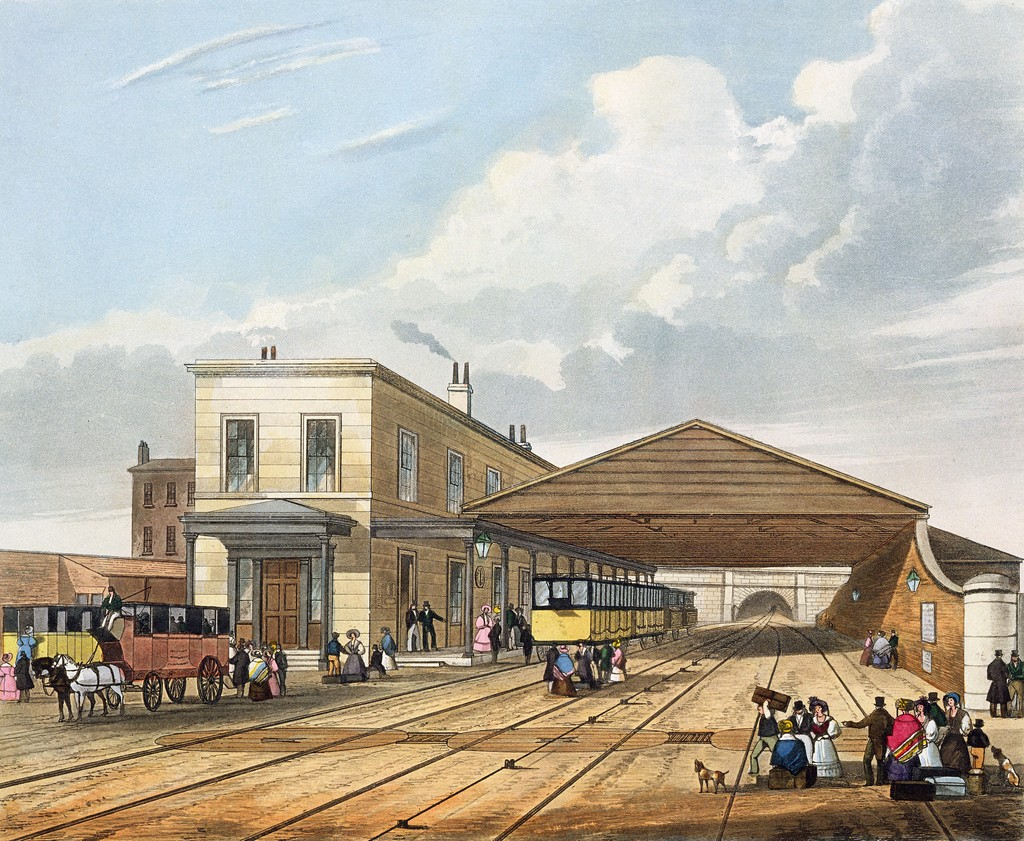
Opened in 1830 and reached through a tunnel, Liverpool's Crown Street railway station was the first ever railway terminus. The station was demolished after only six years, being replaced by Lime Street station in the city center. The tunnel still exists.

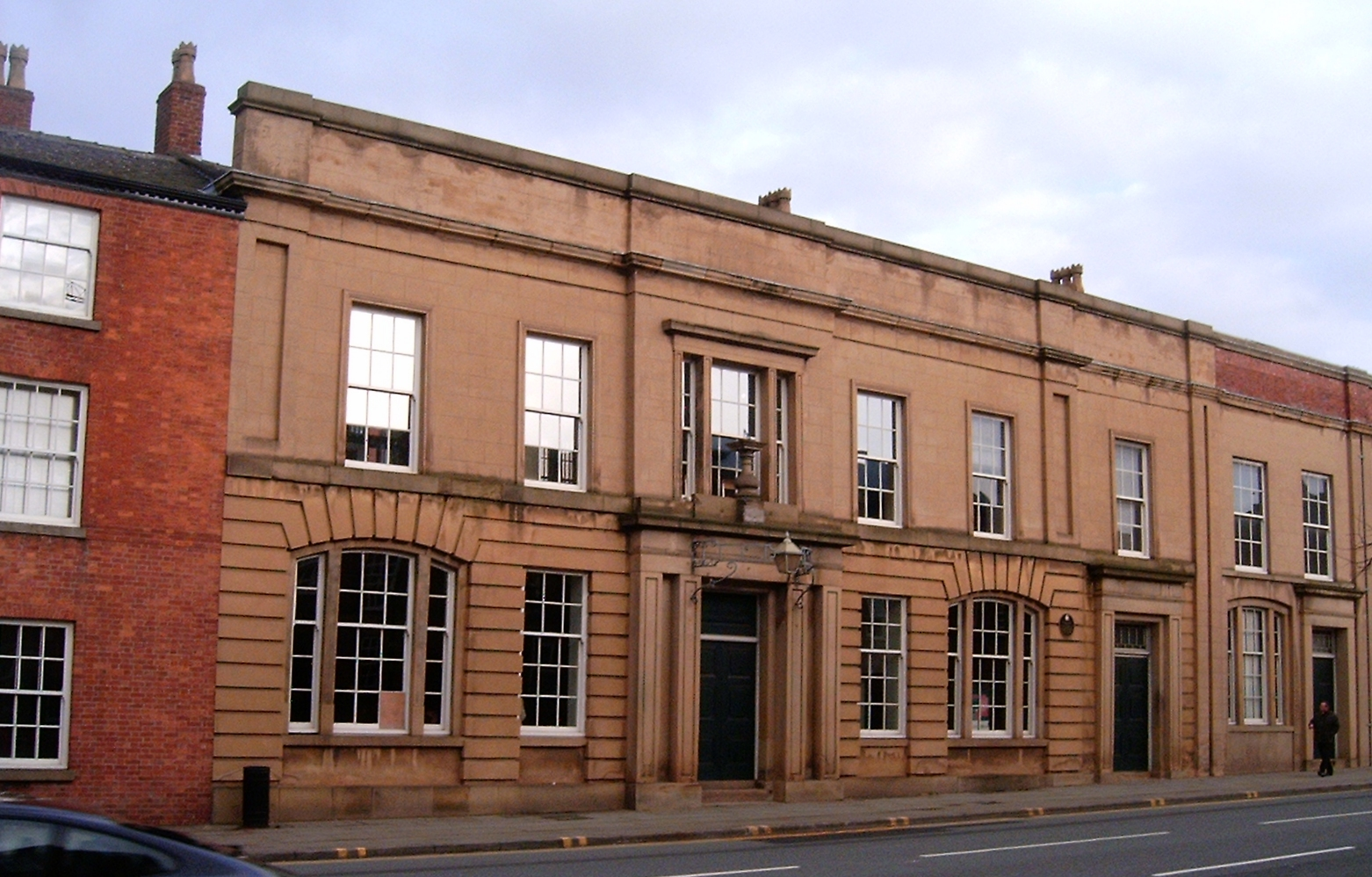
Opened in 1830, Liverpool Road station in Manchester is the oldest surviving railway terminus building in the world.

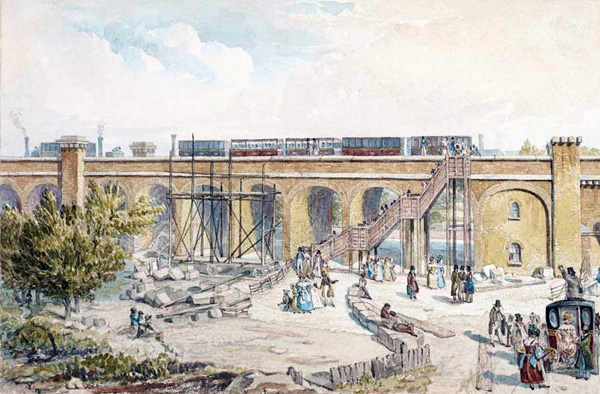
Opened in 1836, Spa Road railway station in London was the city's first terminus and also the world's first elevated station and terminus.

A "terminus" or "terminal" is a station at the end of a railway line. Trains arriving there have to end their journeys (terminate) or reverse out of the station. Depending on the station layout, this usually permits travelers to reach all the platforms without crossing any tracks – the public entrance to the station and the main reception facilities are at the far end of the platforms.

Sometimes the track continues for a short distance beyond the station, and terminating trains continue forward after depositing their passengers, before either proceeding to sidings or reversing to the station to pick up departing passengers. Bondi Junction, Australia and Kristiansand Station, Norway are examples.

A terminus is frequently, but not always, the final destination of trains arriving at the station. Especially in continental Europe, a city may have a terminus as its main railway station, with all main lines converging there. In such cases, all trains arriving at the terminus must leave in the reverse direction from that of their arrival. There are several ways in which this can be accomplished:

- arranging for the service to be provided by a multiple-unit or push–pull train, both of which are capable of operating in either direction; the driver walks to the other end of the train and takes control from the other cab; this is increasingly the normal method in Europe, and is very common in Britain and North America.
- by detaching the locomotive that brought the train into the station, and then either
  - using another track to "run it around" to the other end of the train, to which it then re-attaches;
  - attaching a second locomotive to the outbound end of the train; or
- by the use of a "wye", a roughly triangular arrangement of track and switches (points) where a train can reverse direction and back into the terminal;
- historically, turntables were used to reverse steam engines.

There may also be a bypass line, used by freight trains that do not need to stop at the terminus.

Some termini have newer through platforms beneath (or above, or alongside) the terminal platforms on the main level. They are used by a cross-city extension of the main line, often for commuter trains, while the terminal platforms may serve long-distance services. Examples of underground through lines include the Thameslink platforms at St Pancras in London, the Argyle and North Clyde lines of Glasgow's suburban rail network, in Antwerp in Belgium, the RER at the Gare du Nord in Paris, the Milan suburban railway service's Passante railway, and many of the numerous S-Bahn lines at terminal stations in Germany, Austria and Switzerland, such as at Zürich Hauptbahnhof. Due to the disadvantages of terminus stations there have been multiple cases in which one or several terminus stations were replaced with a new through-station, including the cases of Berlin Hauptbahnhof, Vienna Hauptbahnhof and numerous examples throughout the first century of railroading. Stuttgart 21 is a controversial project involving the replacement of a terminus station by a through-station.

An American example of a terminal with this feature is Union Station in Washington, DC, where there are bay platforms on the main concourse level to serve terminating trains and standard island platforms one level below to serve trains continuing southward. The lower tracks run in a tunnel beneath the concourse and emerge a few blocks away to cross the Potomac River into Virginia.

Terminus stations in large cities are by far the biggest stations, with the largest being Grand Central Terminal in New York City. Other major cities, such as London, Boston, Paris, Istanbul, Tokyo, and Milan have more than one terminus, rather than routes straight through the city. Train journeys through such cities often require alternative transport (metro, bus, taxi or ferry) from one terminus to the other. For instance, in Istanbul, transfers from the Sirkeci Terminal (the European terminus) and the Haydarpaşa Terminal (the Asian terminus) historically required crossing the Bosphorus via alternative means, before the Marmaray railway tunnel linking Europe and Asia was completed. Some cities, including New York, have both termini and through lines.

Terminals with competing rail lines that frequently use the station often establish a jointly owned terminal railroad to own and operate the station, its associated tracks, and switching operations.

== Stop ==
During a journey, the term station stop may be used in announcements to differentiate halts during which passengers may alight and halts for other reasons, such as a locomotive change.

While a junction or interlocking usually divides two or more lines or routes, and thus has remotely or locally operated signals, a station stop does not. A station stop usually has no tracks other than the main tracks and may or may not have switches (points, crossovers).

=== Intermediate station ===
An intermediate station does not have any other connecting route, unlike branch-off stations, connecting stations, transfer stations and railway junctions. In a broader sense, an intermediate station is generally any station on the route between its two terminal stations.

In practice, most stations are intermediate. They are mostly designed as through stations; there are only a few intermediate stations that take the form of a stub-end station, for example, at some zigzags. If there is a station building, it is usually located to the side of the tracks. In the case of intermediate stations used for both passenger and freight traffic, there is a distinction between those where the station building and goods facilities are on the same side of the tracks and those in which the goods facilities are on the opposite side of the tracks from the station building.

Intermediate stations also occur on some funicular and cable car routes.

==== Infill station ====
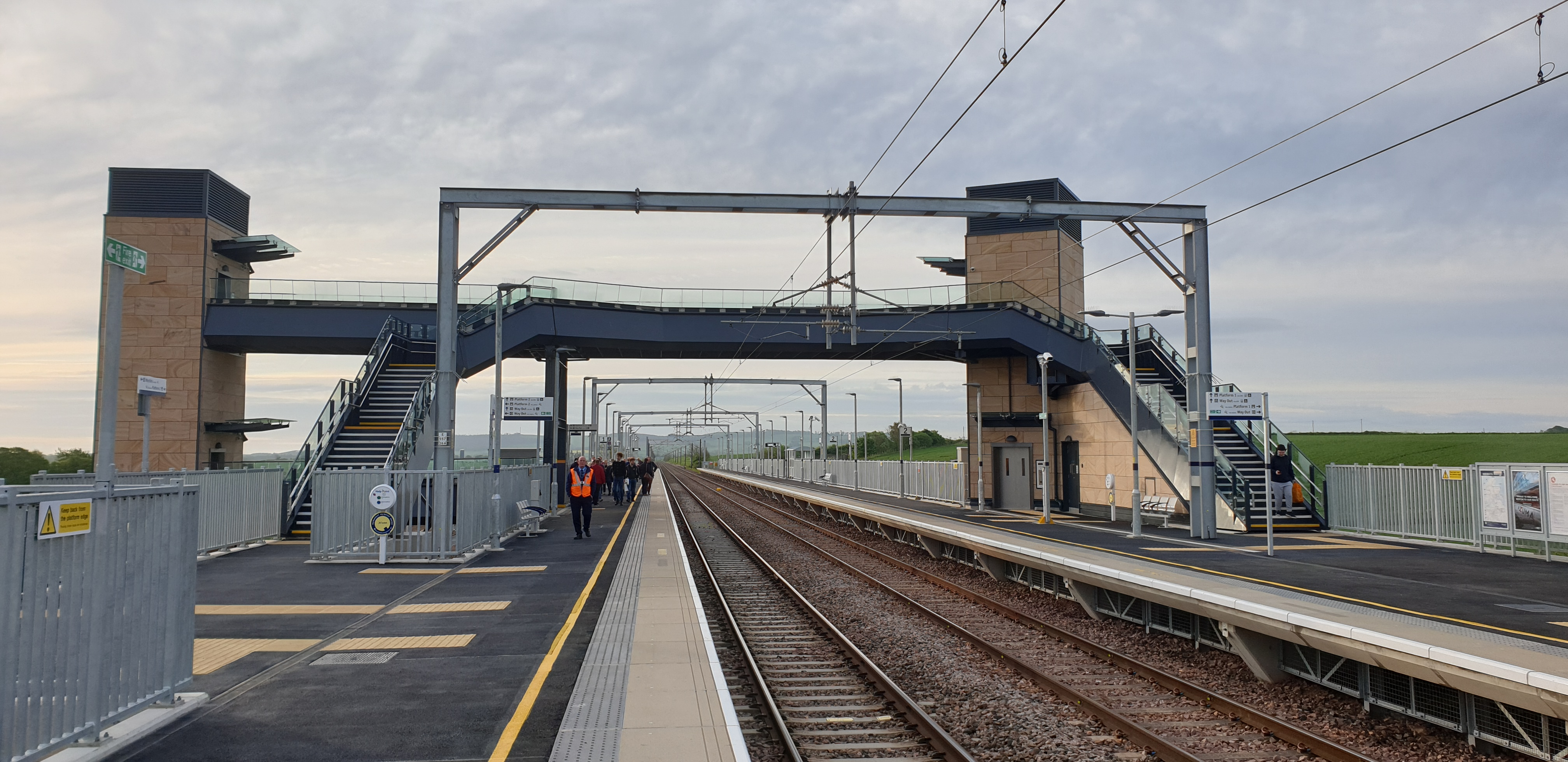
Reston railway station is an example of an infill station.

An infill station (sometimes in-fill station) is a train station built on an existing passenger rail, rapid transit, or light rail line to address demand in a location between existing stations. Such stations leverage existing train service and attract new riders by offering a more convenient location. Many older transit systems have widely spaced stations and can benefit from infill stations, at the cost of a small slowdown of trains from the additional stop. In some cases, new infill stations are built at sites where a station had once existed many years ago, for example, the Cermak–McCormick Place station on the Chicago 'L''s Green Line.

=== Halt ===
A halt, in railway parlance in the Commonwealth of Nations, Ireland and Portugal, is a small passenger station, usually unstaffed or with very few staff, and with few or no facilities. A halt is usually equipped with a platform or platforms on the through track(s) and the appropriate signage, but not with switches. In some cases, trains stop only on request when passengers on the platform indicate they wish to board, or when passengers on the train inform the crew they wish to alight. These can sometimes appear with signals and sometimes without.

==== United Kingdom ====
The Great Western Railway in Great Britain began opening haltes on 12 October 1903; from 1905, the French spelling was Anglicised to "halt". These GWR halts had the most basic facilities, with platforms long enough for only one or two carriages; some had no raised platform at all, necessitating steps up onto the carriages. Halts were normally unstaffed, with tickets being sold on the train. On 1 September 1904, a larger version, known on the GWR as a "platform" rather than a "halt", was introduced; these had longer platforms and were usually staffed by a senior-grade porter, who sold tickets and sometimes booked parcels or milk consignments.

From 1903 to 1947, the GWR built 379 halts and inherited a further 40 from other companies at the Grouping of 1923. Peak building periods were before the First World War (145 built) and 1928–1939 (198 built). Ten more were opened by British Rail on ex-GWR lines. The GWR also built 34 "platforms".

Many such stops remain on the national railway networks in the United Kingdom, such as Penmaenmawr in North Wales, Yorton in Shropshire, and The Lakes in Warwickshire, where passengers are requested to inform a member of on-board train staff if they wish to alight, or, if catching a train from the station, to make themselves clearly visible to the driver and use a hand signal as the train approaches. Most have had "Halt" removed from their names. Two publicly advertised and publicly accessible National Rail stations retain it: Coombe Junction Halt and St Keyne Wishing Well Halt.

Many other halts are still open and operational on privately owned, heritage, and preserved railways throughout the British Isles. The word is often used informally to describe stations on the national rail network with limited service and low usage, such as the Oxfordshire Halts on the Cotswold Line. It has also sometimes been used for stations served by public services but accessible only by persons travelling to/from an associated factory (for example IBM near Greenock and British Steel Redcar– although neither of these is any longer served by trains), or military base (such as Lympstone Commando) or railway yard. The only two such "private" stopping places on the national system, where the "halt" designation is still officially used, seem to be Staff Halt (at Durnsford Road, Wimbledon) and Battersea Pier Sidings Staff Halt, both of which are for railway staff only.

==== Other countries ====
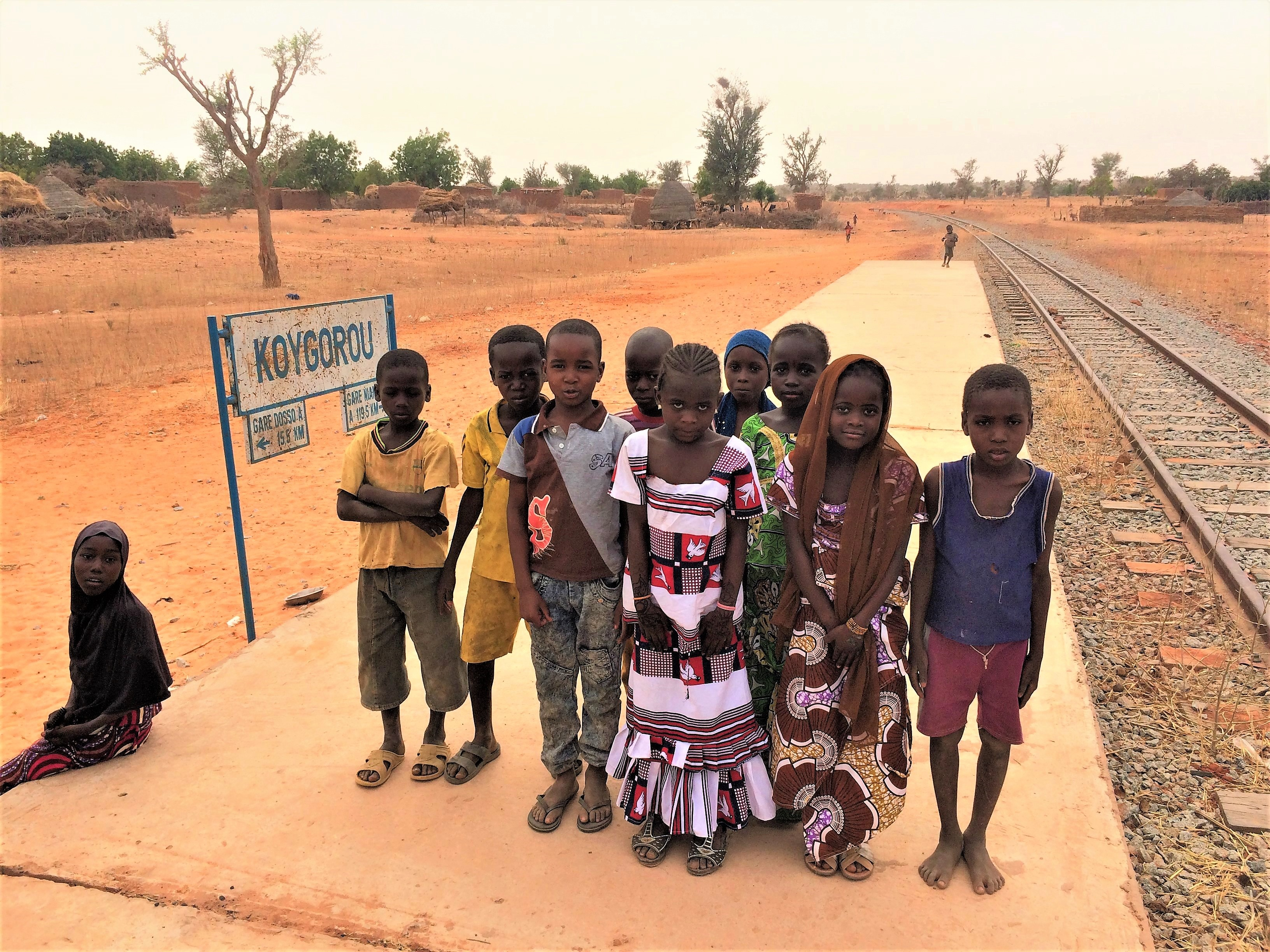
A halt at Koygorou on the Niamey-Dosso railway in Niger

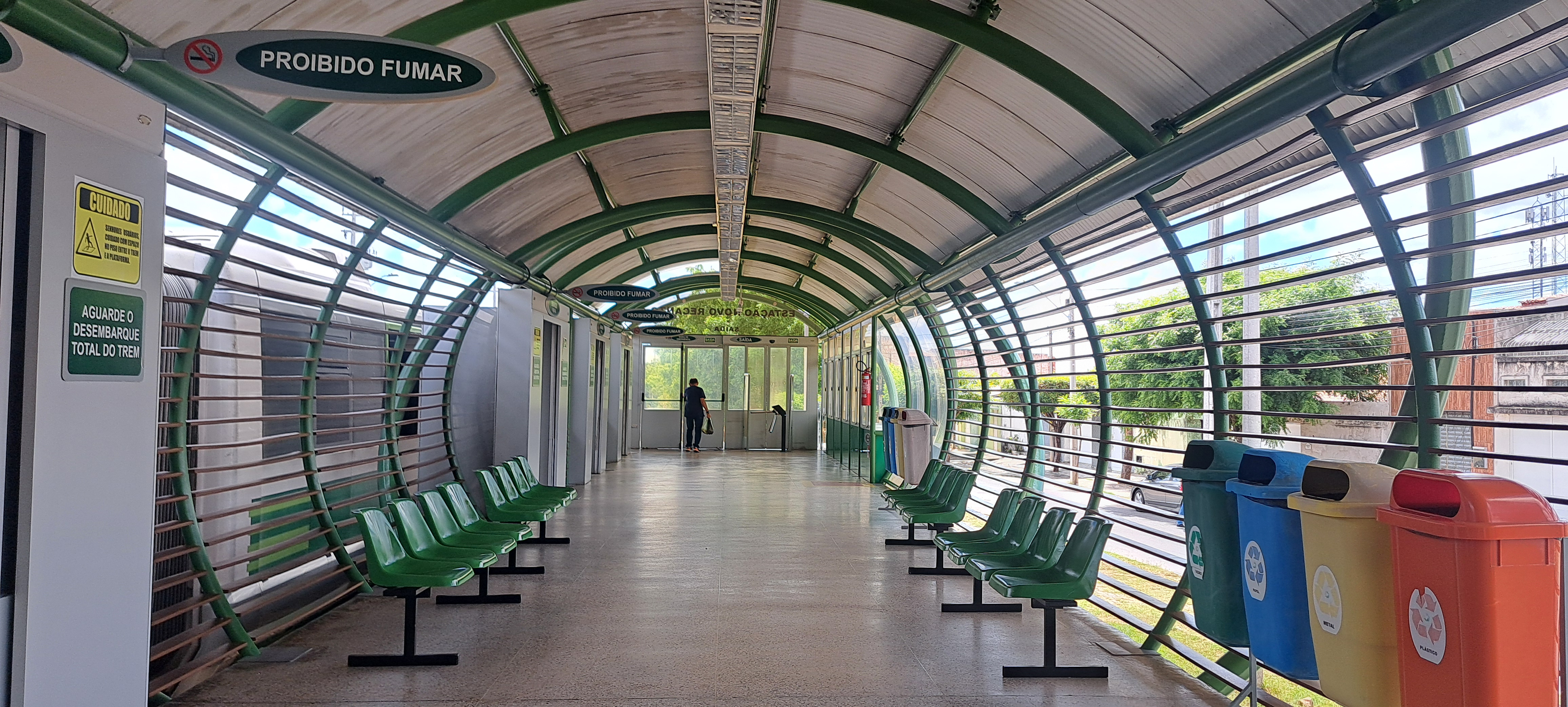
VLT de Sobral, a light rail station in Brazil, part of Sobral Metro

In Portugal, railway stops are called halts (Portuguese: apeadeiro).

In Ireland, a few small railway stations are designated as "halts" (Irish: stadanna, sing. stad).

In some Commonwealth countries, the term "halt" is used.

In Australia, with its sparsely populated rural areas, such stopping places were common on lines that were still open to passenger traffic. In the state of Victoria, for example, a location on a railway line where a small diesel railcar or railmotor could stop on request, allowing passengers to board or alight, was called a "rail motor stopping place" (RMSP). Usually situated near a level crossing, it was often designated solely by a sign beside the railway. The passenger could hail the driver to stop, and could buy a ticket from the train guard or conductor. In South Australia, such facilities were called "provisional stopping places". They were often placed on routes on which "school trains" (services conveying children from rural localities to and from school) operated.

In West Malaysia, halts are commonplace along the less-developed KTM East Coast railway line to serve rural 'kampongs' (villages), which require train services to stay connected to important nodes but do not need staff. People boarding at halts who have not bought tickets online can buy them from the staff on board.

In rural and remote communities across Canada and the United States, passengers wanting to board the train at such places had to flag the train down to stop it, hence the name "flag stops" or "flag stations".

== Accessibility ==
Accessibility for disabled people is mandated by law in some countries. Considerations include:

- Elevators or ramps to every platform are necessary for people in wheelchairs who cannot use stairs, and also allow those with prams, bicycles, and luggage to reach the platform more easily and safely
- Minimising the platform gap in both height and width. This also requires rolling stock with appropriate dimensions. At some stations, a railway worker can install a temporary ramp to allow wheelchair users to board. Relying on temporary ramps can leave people in wheelchairs stranded on a train or platform if a staff member fails to deploy the ramp.
- Station facilities such as accessible toilets, payphones, and audible announcements
- Tactile paving to warn visually impaired people that they are approaching a platform edge. Platform screen doors also physically prevent people from falling from the platform edge.

In the United Kingdom, rail operators will arrange alternative transport (typically a taxi) at no extra cost to the ticket holder if the station they intend to travel to or from is inaccessible.

== Goods stations ==
Goods or freight stations deal exclusively or predominantly with the loading and unloading of goods and may well have marshalling yards (classification yards) for the sorting of wagons. The world's first goods terminal was the 1830 Park Lane Goods Station at the South End Liverpool Docks. Built in 1830, the terminal was reached by a 1.24-mile (2 km) tunnel.

As goods are increasingly moved by road, many former goods stations, as well as the goods sheds at passenger stations, have closed. Many are used solely for cross-loading freight and may be known as transshipment stations, where they primarily handle containers. They are also known as container stations or terminals.

== Records ==
=== Worldwide ===
- The world's busiest passenger station, with a passenger throughput of 3.5 million passengers per day (1.27 billion per year), is Shinjuku Station in Tokyo.
- The world's station with most platforms is Grand Central Terminal in New York City with 44 platforms.
- The world's station with the longest platform is Hubballi Junction railway station with a platform length of 1,505 metres (4,938 ft) and is located in Karnataka, India.
- The world's highest station above ground level (not above sea level) is Hualongqiao station in Chongqing with Line 9 trains stopping 48 meters above the surface.
- Coney Island–Stillwell Avenue station in New York City is the world's largest elevated terminal with 8 tracks and 4 island platforms.
- Shanghai South railway station, opened in June 2006, has the world's largest circular transparent roof.

=== Europe ===
Busiest

- Gare du Nord, in Paris, is, by the number of travelers, at around 214 million per year, the busiest railway station in Europe, the 24th busiest in the world, and the busiest outside Japan.
- Clapham Junction, in London, is Europe's busiest station by daily rail traffic with 100 to 180 trains per hour passing through.
- Zürich HB is the busiest terminus in Europe by the volume of rail traffic.

Largest

- Leipzig Hbf is the biggest railway station in Europe in terms of floor area (83,460 square metres (898,400 sq ft)).

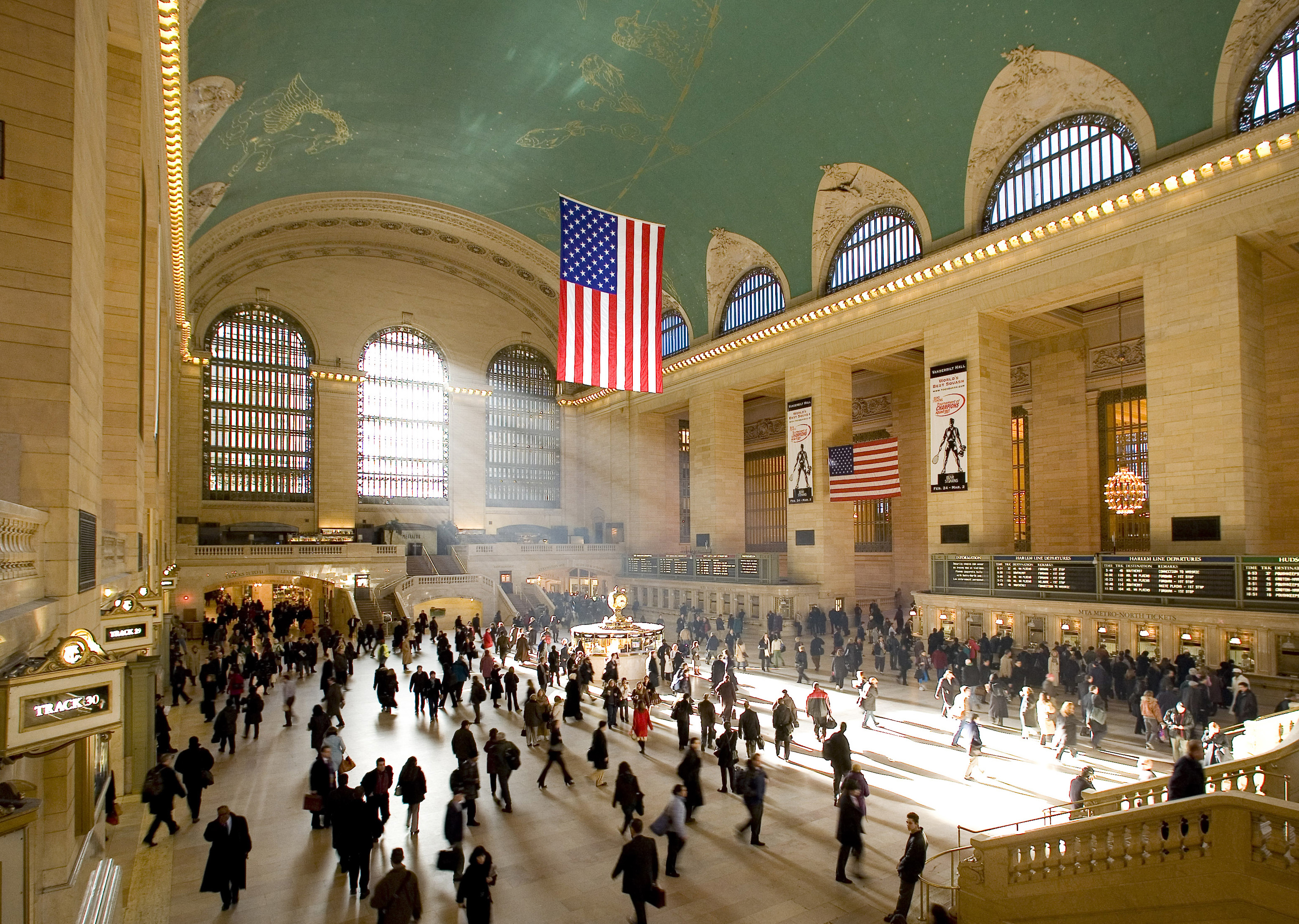
Grand Central Terminal in New York City is the largest station by number of platforms, with 44 on two levels.

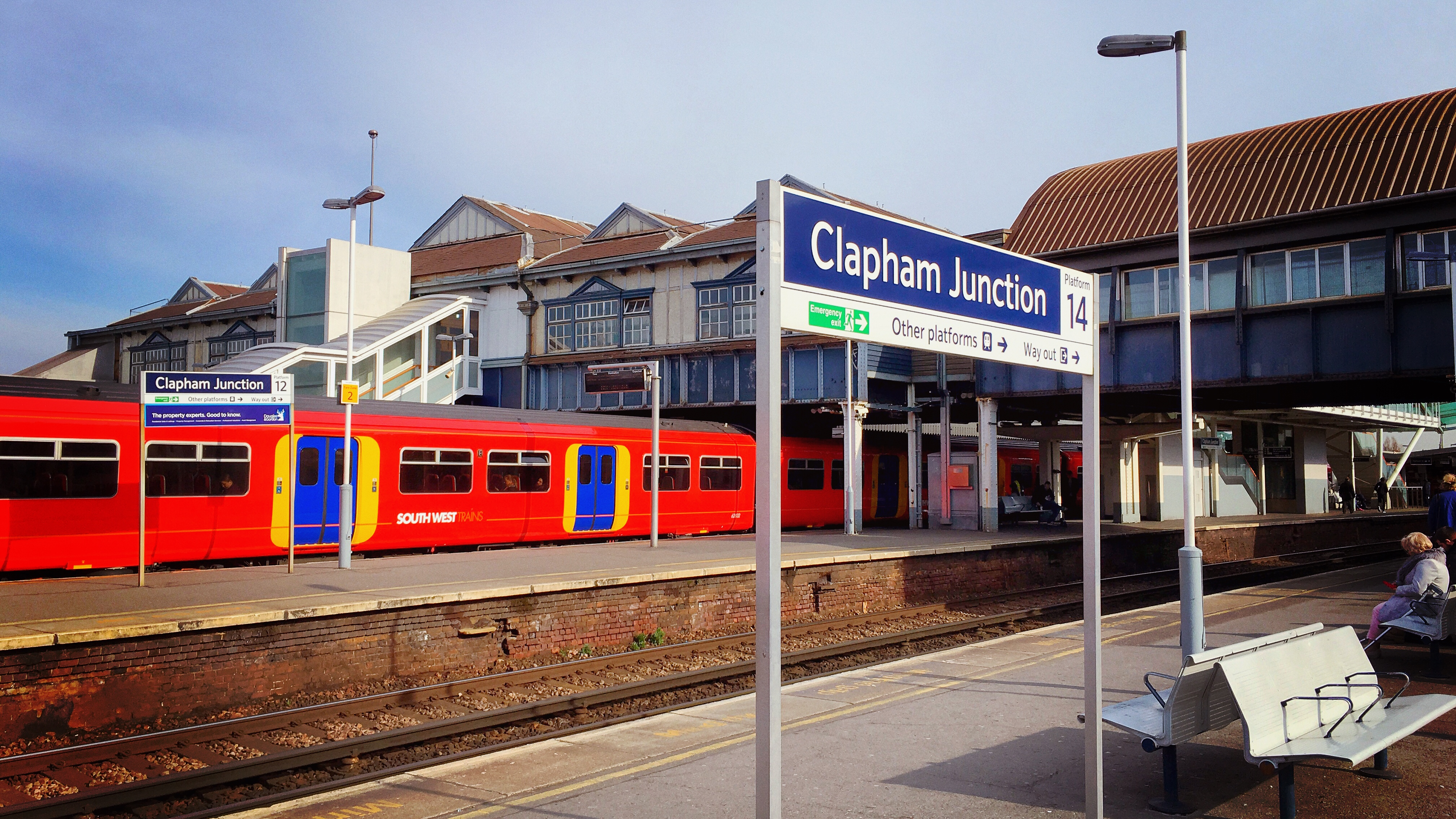
Clapham Junction in London is the busiest station in terms of rail traffic with an average of one train every 20 seconds at peak times.

- München Hbf and Rome Termini are the largest railway stations by number of platforms (32).
- Milan Centrale is the largest railway station in Europe by volume.
- Nuremberg Central Station is the largest through station by number of platforms (22)

Highest

- Jungfraujoch railway station is the highest railway station on the European continent (3,453 metres (11,329 ft)).

=== North America ===
- New York Penn Station is the busiest station in the Western Hemisphere.
- Toronto's Union Station is the busiest station in Canada.

=== South America ===
- Constitución railway station in Buenos Aires, Argentina is the busiest station in South America.
- Temperley Station is the largest intermediate station in South America.

== See also ==
- Bus station – Bus facility larger than a bus stop
- Bus terminus – Bus station where services begin / terminate their scheduled route
- Freight station – Railway station for goods
- List of IATA-indexed railway stations
- List of railway stations
- Metro station – Railway station of a rapid transit system
- Rail yard – Enclosed area designated for railways
  - Classification yard – Rail yard for sorting and assembling rail vehicles into trains
- Running in board – Large name sign on railway station platform
- Station building – Main building of a passenger railway station

== Bibliography ==
- Coleford, I. C. (October 2010). Smith, Martin (ed.). "By GWR to Blaenau Ffestiniog (Part One)". Railway Bylines. 15 (11). Radstock: Irwell Press Limited.
- Reade, Lewis (1983). Branch Line Memories Vol 1. Redruth, Cornwall: Atlantic Transport & Historical Publishers. ISBN 978-0-90-689906-9.
