= Swansea The Mount railway station =

Swansea The Mount

General information
- Location: Swansea; Wales
- Coordinates: 51.6180°N 3.9383°W

Other information
- Status: Disused

History
- Original company: Oystermouth Railway
- Pre-grouping: Swansea and Mumbles Railway
Location

The Mount, which was located in Swansea on the Oystermouth Railway and which first opened to passengers in 1807, was the world's first recorded railway station. It was the point on the railway at which Benjamin French commenced to pick up passengers for the journey to Oystermouth (also known as Mumbles) on or after 25 March 1807. The station's physical form is not known, and it is unlikely that any special facilities (e.g. platforms, booking office, etc.) were provided, but its location was close to the later site of the Royal Institution of South Wales (Swansea Museum).

== History ==
In 1804 the British Parliament approved the laying of a railway line between Swansea and Oystermouth in South Wales, for transportation of quarried materials to and from the Swansea Canal and the harbour at the mouth of the River Tawe and in the autumn of that year the first tracks were laid. At this stage, the railway was known as the Oystermouth Railway and controlled by the Committee of the Company of Proprietors of the Oystermouth Railway or Tramroad Company, which included many prominent citizens of Swansea, including the copper and coal magnate John Morris (later Sir John Morris, Bart.). In later years it became known as the Swansea and Mumbles Railway.

There was no road link between Swansea and Oystermouth at the beginning of the nineteenth century and the original purpose of the railway was to transport coal, iron ore and limestone. Construction seems to have been completed in 1806 and operations began without formal ceremony, using horse-drawn vehicles. As constructed, the line ran from the Brewery Bank adjacent to the Swansea Canal in Swansea, around the wide sweep of Swansea Bay to a terminus at Castle Hill (near the present-day Clements Quarry) in the tiny isolated fishing village of Oystermouth.

In February 1807, approval was given to carry passengers along the line, when one of the original proprietors, Benjamin French, offered to pay the company the sum of twenty pounds in lieu of tolls for the right to do so for twelve months from 25 March 1807. This is usually cited as the date when the first regular service carrying passengers between Swansea and Oystermouth began, thus giving the railway the claim of being the first passenger railway in the world. Passenger services operated from The Mount, the world's first recorded railway station.
