= Swansea and Mumbles Railway =

First passenger railway system in the world

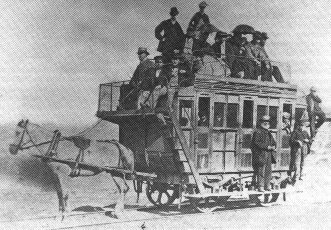
- Locale: Swansea, West Glamorgan, Wales
- Terminus: Swansea The Mount; Swansea Victoria
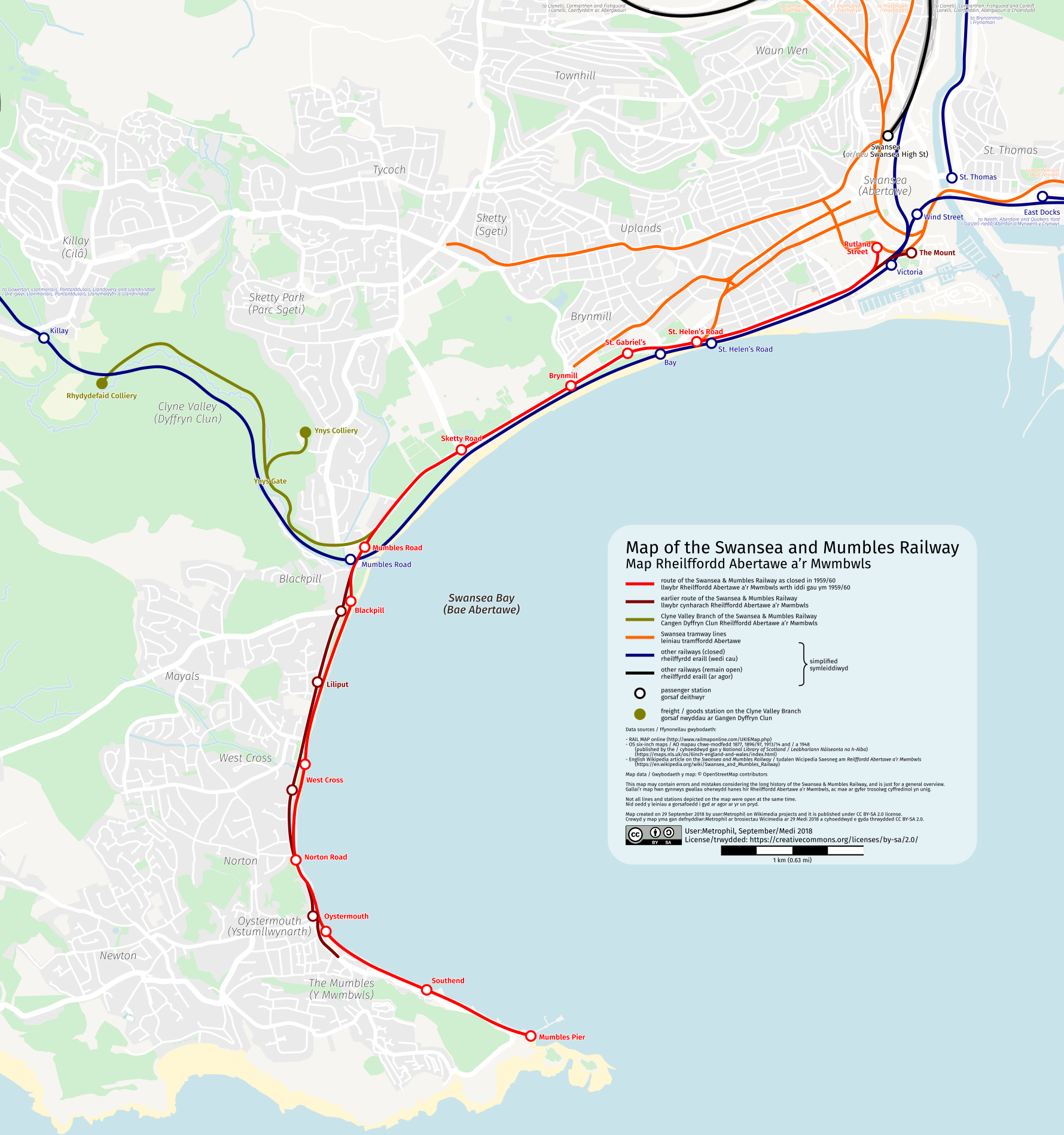
- Map

Commercial operations
- Built by: Oystermouth Tramroad Company
- Original gauge: 4 ft (1,219 mm) to 1855; 4 ft 8 1/2 in (1,435 mm) standard gauge since

Preserved operations
- Operated by: Swansea and Mumbles Railway
- Stations: 7
- Length: 5 1/2 miles (8.9 km)
- Preserved gauge: 4 ft 8 1/2 in (1,435 mm) standard gauge
- 1804: Track laying approved
- 1807: Line began service
- 1855: Converted to 4 ft 8 1/2 in (1,435 mm) standard gauge
- 1877: Replaced with steam power
- 1893: Route extended south
- 1929: Electric trams in service
- 1960: Purchased & closed by South Wales Transport

The Swansea and Mumbles Railway was the world's first passenger railway, located in Swansea, Wales, United Kingdom.

Originally built under an act of Parliament, the Oystermouth Railway or Tramroad Act 1804, to move limestone from the quarries of Mumbles to Swansea and to the markets beyond, it carried the world's first fare-paying railway passengers under an agreement effective from 25 March 1807. It later moved from horse power to steam locomotion, and was finally converted to electric power, using the largest tram cars ever built for service in Britain, before closing in January 1960, in favour of motor buses.

At the time of the railway's closure, it was claimed to have been the world's longest serving railway, although this distinction has to be qualified because other railways which were used solely for goods traffic (e.g. the Middleton Railway in Leeds, Yorkshire, dating from 1758) had been operating for longer.

== History ==
Oystermouth Railway or Tramroad Act 1804
- Act of Parliament
- Parliament of the United Kingdom
- Long title: An Act for making and maintaining a Railway or Tramroad from the Town of Swansea, into the Parish of Oystermouth in the County of Glamorgan.
- Citation: 44 Geo. 3. c. lv

Dates
- Royal assent: 29 June 1804

Other legislation
- Repealed by: South Wales Transport Act 1959

Status: Repealed

Text of statute as originally enacted

In the Oystermouth Railway or Tramroad Act 1804 (44 Geo. 3. c. lv) the British Parliament approved the laying of a railway line between Swansea and Oystermouth in South Wales, for the transport of quarried materials to and from the Swansea Canal and the harbour at the mouth of the River Tawe, and later that year the first tracks were laid. At this stage, the railway was known as the Oystermouth Railway and controlled by the Committee of the Company of Proprietors of the Oystermouth Railway or Tramroad Company, which included many prominent citizens of Swansea, including the copper and coal magnate John Morris (later Sir John Morris, 1st Baronet). In later years it became known as the Swansea and Mumbles Railway (although the original company was not wound up until 1959), or just the Mumbles Railway, but to local people it was simply the Mumbles Train.

=== Early days ===
There was no road link between Swansea and Oystermouth at the beginning of the 19th century and the original purpose of the railway was to transport coal, iron ore and limestone. Construction seems to have been completed in 1806 and operations began without formal ceremony, using horse-drawn vehicles. As constructed, the line ran from the Brewery Bank adjacent to the Swansea Canal in Swansea, around the wide sweep of Swansea Bay to a terminus at Castle Hill (near the present-day Clements Quarry) in the tiny isolated fishing village of Oystermouth (known as Mumbles). There was also a branch from Blackpill which ran up the Clyne valley for nearly 1 mile (1.6 km) to Ynys Gate which was intended to promote the development of the valley's coal reserves.

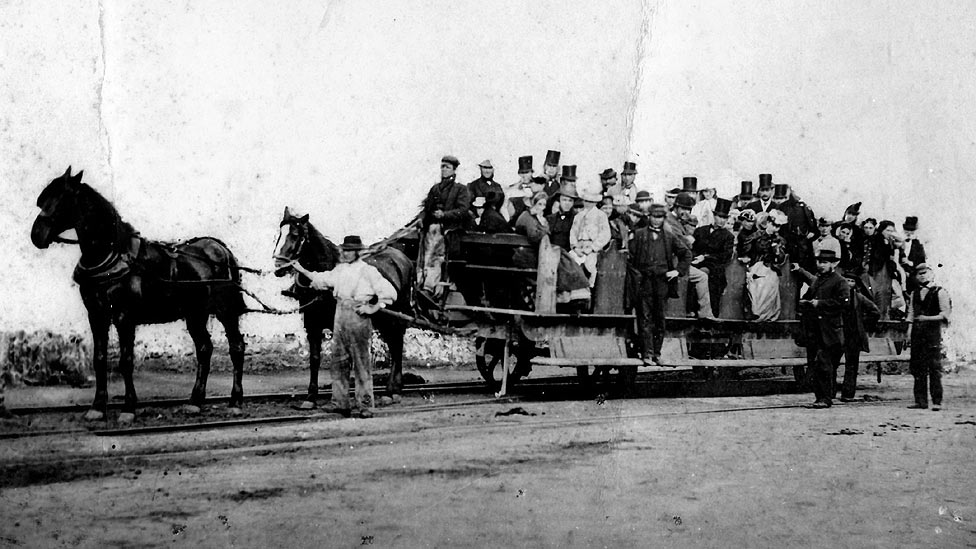
Horse-drawn tram on the Swansea and Mumbles Railway, 1897

In February 1807, approval was given to carry passengers along the line, when one of the original proprietors, Benjamin French, offered to pay the company the sum of twenty pounds in lieu of tolls for the right to do so for twelve months from the following quarter day, 25 March 1807. This is usually cited as the date when the first regular service carrying passengers between Swansea and Oystermouth began, thus giving the railway the claim of being the first passenger railway in the world. Passenger services operated from The Mount, the world's first recorded railway station. The venture was evidently a success because the following year French joined with two others in offering the increased sum of twenty five pounds to continue the arrangement for a further year, but the construction of a turnpike road parallel to the railway in the mid-1820s robbed it of much of its traffic and the passenger service (by that time in the hands of one Simon Llewelyn) ceased in 1826 or 1827, ironically just as events elsewhere in the United Kingdom (particularly in the north east of England) were paving the way for the development of railways as a truly national and international transport system for both goods and passengers.

In its early days the line operated in the same manner as the contemporary canals and turnpike roads. Tolls and charges were laid down in the enabling act of Parliament and any trader could use the line on provision of a suitable waggon and after paying the appropriate toll to the owning Company. The railway was laid in the form of a plateway, with the rails being approximately 4 ft (1,219 mm) apart.

After cessation of the passenger service the line became derelict and the original company of proprietors virtually moribund. The Clyne valley branch was relaid in 1841/2 and extended for a further 1 mile (1.6 km) (as a private line) to the Rhydydefaid colliery where George Byng Morris, the son of one of the original proprietors, had started to exploit the coal and iron reserves of the valley. From about 1855, George Byng Morris took the line in hand, relaid it with edge rails (i.e. as a conventional railway) to the standard gauge of 4 ft 8 1/2 in (1,435 mm) and reintroduced a horse-drawn passenger service between Swansea and a terminus at The Dunns in Oystermouth.

=== Introduction of steam ===
Steam power first replaced the horses in 1877 when trials were undertaken with one of Henry Hughes's patent tramway locomotives, aptly named Pioneer. These were successful and two further locomotives of the same type were obtained, although a dispute between the Swansea Improvements and Tramway Company (SI&T) (which owned the locomotives) and the line's then owner, John Dickson (who had come into possession following the death of George Byng Morris) meant that horses continued to operate certain services until 1896. At this time there was a junction between the Mumbles Railway and the Swansea town tramway system at the Slip, allowing SI&T cars to run through from Swansea town centre to Oystermouth. The nature of the dispute was such that the Swansea & Mumbles company demanded that the SI&T horse cars should follow their own steam-hauled services on the line. In 1889, a new company, the Mumbles Railway and Pier Company, was incorporated to extend the railway beyond Oystermouth to a new pier close to Mumbles Head. The first section, to Southend, was opened in 1893 and the remainder, including the pier, in 1898.

The Clyne valley branch continued to be used for coal traffic from Rhydydefaid pit until its closure in 1885 after which the entire branch fell into disuse. In 1896 the promoters of the Gower Light Railway proposed incorporating it into their scheme but nothing came of it. The original branch to Ynys Gate (as authorised in 1804) was relaid in connection with the Clyne Valley slant (opened 1903) and used for coal traffic until the colliery closed in 1915. The extension of 1841/2 remained abandoned until 1920 when a narrow-gauge tramway was laid on its formation to carry coal from Ynys slant to Ynys Gate. This was used only until 1921 when the slant closed. There was then no further traffic on the branch, although the track remained in situ and was still usable as late as 1936 when it is recorded that a diesel locomotive made a trip up the branch as far as Ynys Gate.

A somewhat motley collection of steam locomotives was used to maintain services between 1877 and 1929, beginning with the Hughes tramway locomotives mentioned above (which were actually owned by the SI&T and therefore not able to be used on the railway after 1878). Dickson had purchased two saddle tank locomotives of more conventional outline from the Falcon Engine & Car Works (successor to Hughes's Locomotive and Tramway Engine Works), and two more from Manning Wardle & Co of Leeds in the early 1880s. A further locomotive (originally numbered 5, later 3) came from the Hunslet Engine Company of Leeds in 1885. When the new Swansea and Mumbles Railway Company took over operations in 1890 it ordered two 0-4-0 saddle tank locomotives from Black, Hawthorn & Co of Gateshead. These were delivered in 1891 and numbered 1 and 2; they worked on the line until after the First World War. Two larger 0-6-0 side tank locomotives were obtained from the Hunslet Engine Company in 1898; numbered 4 and 5, they bore the brunt of the passenger service until well into the 1920s. The nominally independent Mumbles Railway and Pier Company ordered a 0-4-0 saddle tank from the Brush Electrical Engineering Co of Loughborough (successor to the Falcon Engine & Car Works) in 1906 and this carried plates reading "MR & P No. 3" to denote its ownership. Finally, a second-hand Avonside 0-6-0ST was obtained and named Swansea. All were tank locomotives of 0-4-0 or 0-6-0 wheel arrangement. Ownership was vested variously in the Swansea and Mumbles Railway Company or the Mumbles Railway and Pier Company (and sometimes transferred between the two for accounting purposes) and as early as the 1890s there is evidence that the railway was having to hire in locomotives to supplement its own fleet. By the 1920s, locomotives were regularly being hired from a local dealer, Charles Williams of Morriston, and frequently appear in photographs of the railway taken at that time.

Oystermouth Railway or Tramroad Act 1899
- Act of Parliament
- Parliament of the United Kingdom
- Long title: An Act to authorise the abandonment of a portion of the Oystermouth Railway or Tramroad for the lease, of the undertaking and of the Mumbles Railway and Pier to the Swansea Improvements and Tramways Company and for other purposes.
- Citation: 62 & 63 Vict. c. ccxxxiv

Dates
- Royal assent: 9 August 1899

Other legislation
- Repealed by: South Wales Transport Act 1959

Status: Repealed

Under the Oystermouth Railway or Tramroad Act 1899 (62 & 63 Vict. c. ccxxxiv) both the Oystermouth Railway (from Swansea to Black Pill) and the Mumbles Railway (from Black Pill to Mumbles) were leased for 999 years by their owning companies (Swansea and Mumbles Railways Limited and Mumbles Railway and Pier Company, respectively) to Swansea Improvements and Tramway Company. In 1929 this lease was transferred from the tramway company to the South Wales Transport Company. Under the Swansea and District Transport Act 1936 the two railway companies themselves became owned by South Wales Transport.

=== Centenary – royal visit ===
The line celebrated its centenary in 1904, producing a special commemorative brochure for the occasion. Two years previously, a notable experiment had been carried out, namely the introduction of battery-powered 'accumulator' cars. These were not a success, but one of the cars was retained after the electrical equipment had been stripped out and used to convey parties of visiting dignitaries, including King Edward VII when he and his consort, Queen Alexandra, visited Swansea for the ceremonial cutting of the first sod of the King's Dock in July 1904. The car was used again for the visit of King Edward's successor, King George V, in 1920, when he officiated at the opening of the Queen's Dock.

=== Electrification ===
Electrification was authorised by the Oystermouth Railway or Tramroad and Mumbles Railway (Electrical Power) Order 1925 (SR&O 1925/550). The line was electrified in 1928 at 650 V DC using overhead transmission – giving it the distinction of having used three forms of regular locomotive power over the years (i.e. horse, steam and electricity). Trials began on 6 July 1928 and full electric services were introduced on 2 March 1929, using a fleet of eleven double-deck cars built by the Brush Electrical Engineering Co of Loughborough, in Leicestershire. These were the largest ever built for service in Britain and each could seat 106 passengers. Furthermore, they were frequently operated in pairs, giving a total seating capacity of 212 per train.

Two further cars were added later, bringing the fleet strength up to thirteen. A four-wheeled petrol-mechanical locomotive was acquired from Hardy Railmotors of Slough, then in Buckinghamshire, to handle the residual goods traffic on the railway, but this proved to be underpowered and was replaced after a few years by a diesel-mechanical locomotive from John Fowler & Co, of Leeds. The Hardy locomotive was retained for a few years and used for shunting the cars in the depot, which was on the site of the former carriage sheds, adjacent to the Rutland Street terminus, and for inspection of the overhead line equipment, but it had been dismantled by 1954, when parts were used in the construction of a replica horse-drawn car to celebrate the line's 150th anniversary.

=== Sale ===
South Wales Transport Act 1959
- Act of Parliament
- Parliament of the United Kingdom
- Long title: An Act to provide for the closing of the Oystermouth railway and the Mumbles railway the dissolution of the Swansea and Mumbles Railways Limited and the Mumbles Railway and Pier Company to confer further powers upon the South Wales Transport Company Limited and for other purposes.
- Citation: 7 & 8 Eliz. 2. c. l

Dates
- Royal assent: 29 July 1959

Other legislation
- Repeals/revokes: Oystermouth Railway or Tramroad Act 1804; Mumbles Railway and Pier Act 1892; Mumbles Railway and Pier Act 1897; Mumbles Railway and Pier Act 1898; Oystermouth Railway or Tramroad Act 1899

Status: Current legislation

Text of statute as originally enacted

In 1958, the South Wales Transport Company (the principal operator of motor bus services in the Swansea town area and predecessor of the modern-day First Cymru company) purchased the railway from the old owning companies (the Swansea and Mumbles Railway Limited, and the Mumbles Railway and Pier Company), having previously been the lessee in succession to the Swansea Improvements and Tramways Company since the 1930s, and the following year went to Parliament with an abandonment bill. Despite vociferous local opposition, the bill became law as the South Wales Transport Act 1959 (7 & 8 Eliz. 2. c. l).

== Closure ==
The railway was closed in two stages. The section from Southend to the pier was closed on 11 October 1959 to facilitate the construction of a special road to the Pier for the buses that were to replace the trains. Then, at 11.52 on Tuesday 5 January 1960, the last train (a ceremonial special, carrying local dignitaries) left Swansea for Mumbles driven by Frank Dunkin, who had worked on the railway since 1907. Within a very short time of the train returning to the Rutland Street depot, work began on dismantling the track and cars.

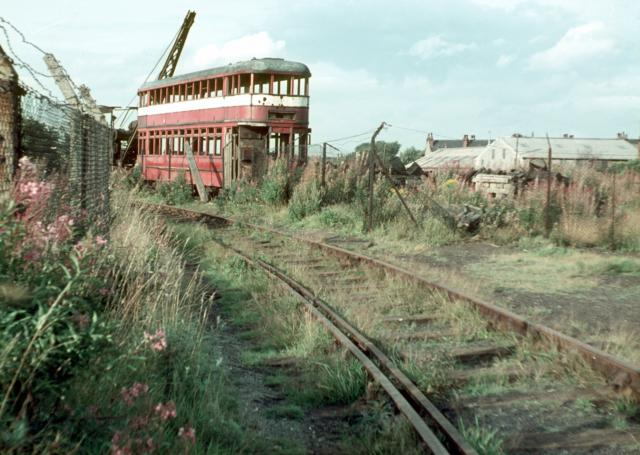
The attempt at preservation of a Mumbles train at the Middleton Railway in Leeds

== Preservation ==
One car (no. 2) was saved for preservation by members of Leeds University in Yorkshire and stored for a while at the Middleton Railway in that city, but it was heavily vandalised and eventually destroyed by fire. The front end of car no. 7 was also saved for preservation at Swansea Museum; following many years of neglect it was initially restored in the early 1970s by members of the Railway Club of Wales and is now on display in the Tram Shed alongside the National Waterfront Museum in Swansea's Maritime Quarter.

A Mumbles Railway Society was formed in 1975 to formally archive material and to maintain the hope that one day the line would re-open.

== Stations ==
The railway had a multitude of stopping places over the years, but at the time of electrification in 1929 the officially recognised stations from Swansea to Mumbles (as published in Bradshaw) were:

- Rutland Street
- St Helen's (frequently known as "The Slip")
- Brynmill
- Ashleigh Road

(Between Ashleigh Road and Blackpill stations the railway was crossed by the LM&SR Central Wales line from Swansea Victoria to Shrewsbury, at a point close to the LM&SR Mumbles Road station. There was a Mumbles Road name board under the bridge on the Mumbles Railway line, but if this was an official stopping place for Mumbles Railway cars it was not recognised as such by Bradshaw.)

- Blackpill
- West Cross
- Norton Road
- Oystermouth
- Southend
- Mumbles Pier (name board read simply "Pier")

== Railway versus tramway ==
The railway is frequently referred to as a tramway, but the original name of the company of proprietors was the Oystermouth Railway or Tramroad Company, the word tramroad being used in its pre-railway context. The original right of way was unique and it was only after the construction of the turnpike road in the 1820s that the line assumed its roadside character. The introduction of steam locomotion in the 1870s was facilitated by a clause in the original act which authorised the "haling or drawing" of waggons by "men, horses, or otherwise" and owed nothing to the Tramways Act 1870 (33 & 34 Vict. c. 78).

The passenger rolling stock used in steam days bore little resemblance to conventional railway carriages, employing open-top, "toast-rack" and "knifeboard" seating, and being built by companies more commonly associated with the construction of urban tramcars, such as G.F. Milnes & Co., Starbuck & Falcon, etc. After electrification the resemblance to an urban tramway became more marked with the introduction of the huge Brush-built electric cars and because of the style of operation (the signalling was used only to regulate entry to the passing loops and not to control the actual running of cars). The track was always laid with conventional railway-type rail and not grooved tram-rail and the railway also handled conventional goods wagons (exchanged with the London and North Western Railway (the London, Midland and Scottish Railway after January 1923) at Mumbles Road station and with the Great Western Railway at the Swansea terminus). In the early nineteenth century a tramway was a line for mineral wagons (trams), the term railway being used when edge rails replaced plates. The term tramway did not become almost exclusively associated with urban transport systems until after the passing of the Tramways Act 1870 (33 & 34 Vict. c. 78).

== Suggested re-opening ==
On 16 February 2009, the City & County of Swansea started the process of looking at the feasibility of trams for the Swansea bay area again. The ERC (Environment, Regeneration and Culture) Overview Board, which is a policy making committee chaired by Councillor Rob Speht, discussed the options for feasibility work and scheduled tasks to assess the technical, financial and social feasibility of bringing trams back to Swansea.

In 2016 the group was working through a formal constitution and going through the steps to register as a Charitable body.

== See also ==
- Timeline of railway history
